= 48th Infantry Regiment "Ferrara" =

Inactive Italian Army infantry unit

- 48° Reggimento Fanteria "Ferrara"
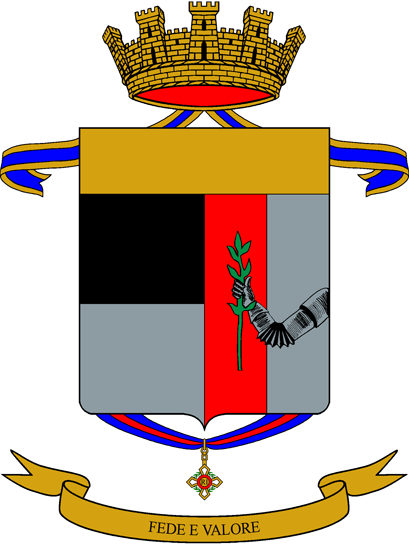
- Regimental coat of arms
- Active: 2 July 1859 – 30 Sept. 1926; 1 July 1937 – 8 Sept. 1943; 1 July 1958 – 31 Jan. 1991
- Country: Italy
- Branch: Italian Army
- Part of: 5th Army Corps
- Garrison/HQ: Bari
- Motto: "Fede e valore"
- Anniversaries: 15 June 1918 – Second Battle of the Piave River
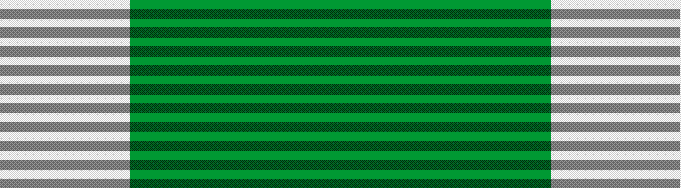
- Decorations: 1× Military Order of Italy; 2× Gold Medals of Military Valor; 1× Silver Medal of Merit

Insignia
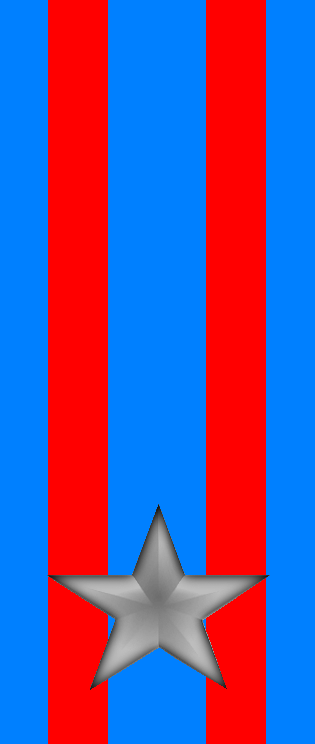
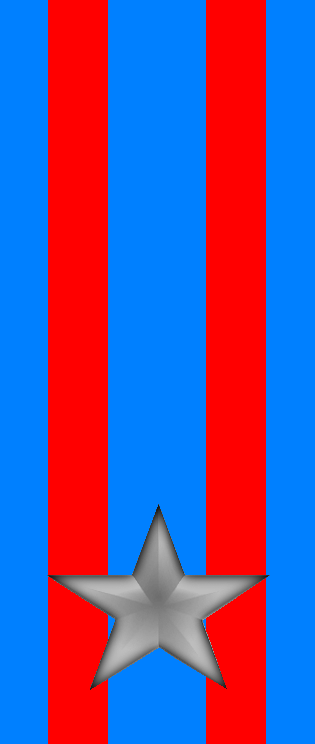
- Regimental gorget patches

The 48th Infantry Regiment "Ferrara" (Italian: 48° Reggimento Fanteria "Ferrara") is an inactive unit of the Italian Army last based in Bari. The regiment is named for the city of Ferrara and part of the Italian Army's infantry arm. On 2 July 1859, during the Second Italian War of Independence, a mobile column was formed with volunteers in Bologna. The column did not see action in the war and was soon split into two columns. On 1 October 1859, the 2nd Mobile Column was renamed 26th Infantry Regiment and assigned, together with the 25th Infantry Regiment, to the Brigade "Ferrara" of the Army of the League of Central Italy of the United Provinces of Central Italy. On 1 January 1860, the 26th Infantry Regiment was renumbered 48th Infantry Regiment, and on 25 March 1860, the regiment joined the Royal Sardinian Army.

In 1866, the regiment participated in the Third Italian War of Independence. In World War I the regiment fought on the Italian front, during which it distinguished itself in the Second Battle of the Piave River and was awarded Italy's highest military honor a Gold Medal of Military Valor. During World War II, the regiment was assigned to the 23rd Infantry Division "Ferrara", with which it fought in the Greco-Italian War, where the regiment earned a second Gold Medal of Military Valor. Afterwards the regiment was sent to occupied Yugoslavia on garrison duty. After the announcement of the Armistice of Cassibile on 8 September 1943 the division and its regiments were disbanded by invading German forces.

In 1958, the regiment was reformed in Bari as a training unit. In 1975, the regiment was disbanded and its flag and traditions assigned to the 48th Infantry Battalion "Ferrara", which was tasked with training recruits destined for the support units of the 5th Army Corps. On 31 January 1991, the battalion was disbanded. The regiment's anniversary falls on 15 June 1918, the first day of the Second Battle of the Piave River, during which the regiment distinguished itself and was awarded Italy's highest military honor a Gold Medal of Military Valor.

== History ==
=== First Italian War of Independence ===
On 5 February 1831, inspired by the Revolutions of 1830, the cities of Bologna, Ferrara, Ravenna, and Forlì in the Papal Legations of the Romagne rose up against the pope's rule. The revolt quickly spread to the cities of Ancona in the Papal Legations of the Marche and Perugia in the Papal Legations of Umbria. In March 1831, the Austrian Empire sent troops to squash the rebels and return the cities to papal rule.

In 1848, this time inspired by the Revolutions of 1848, the cities rose again up against papal rule. At the same time the Kingdom of Sardinia fought the First Italian War of Independence against the Austrian Empire. On 8 August 1848, the citizens of Bologna defeated an Austrian troops, which had been sent to occupy the city. On 23 March 1849, after Sardinia was defeated in the Battle of Novara, King Charles Albert of Sardinia abdicated in favour of his son Victor Emmanuel II. The next day the new King was forced to agree to the Armistice of Vignale, which ended the First Italian War of Independence. This allowed the Austrians to send troops to crush the rebel republics, which had been formed in the Papal Legations of the Romagne and the Marche. On 16 May 1849, after a siege of 8 days, Bologna was forced to surrender to Austrian forces. Afterwards the city was returned papal rule and an Austrian garrison remained in the city.

=== Formation ===
On 21 July 1858, French Emperor Napoleon III and the Prime Minister of Sardinia Camillo Benso, Count of Cavour met in Plombières and reached a secret verbal agreement on a military alliance between the Second French Empire and the Kingdom of Sardinia against the Austrian Empire. On 26 January 1859, Napoleon III signed the Franco-Sardinian Treaty, followed by King Victor Emmanuel II on 29 January 1859. On 9 March 1859, Sardinia mobilized its army, followed by Austria on 9 April. On 23 April, Austria delivered an ultimatum to Sardinia demanding its demobilization. Upon Sardinia's refusal, Austria declared war on 26 April and three days later the Austrians crossed the Ticino river into Piedmont. Consequently France honored its alliance with Sardinia and declared war on Austria on 3 May 1859.

On 2 June 1859, French and Sardinian forces crossed the Ticino river and on 4 June defeated the Austrians in the Battle of Magenta. As a consequence of the defeat the Austrian garrison left Bologna, where on 2 July 1859, volunteers formed the Mobile Column of the Romagne. The column did not see action in the Second Italian War of Independence and was soon divided into the 1st Mobile Column and 2nd Mobile Column. On 10 August 1859, the Provisional Government of the Romagne joined the United Provinces of Central Italy, which then decided to form the Army of the League of Central Italy. On 1 October 1859, the 1st Mobile Column was renamed as the 25th Infantry Regiment, while the 2nd Mobile Column was renamed as the 26th Infantry Regiment. The two regiments were assigned to the Brigade "Ferrara", which was part of the Army of the League of Central Italy.

On 30 November 1859, the Duchy of Parma and Piacenza, Duchy of Modena and Reggio, and the Papal Legations of the Romagne were united under the Royal Government of Emilia, which on 1 January 1860 was redesignated as the Royal Provinces of Emilia. On the same date, the 25th and 26th infantry regiments took their place in the progressive numerical order of the regiments of the Royal Sardinian Army and became the 47th Infantry Regiment (Brigade "Ferrara") and 48th Infantry Regiment (Brigade "Ferrara"). On 11 and 12 March 1860, the Royal Provinces of Emilia voted in a plebiscite for annexation by the Kingdom of Sardinia. On 18 March 1860, the annexation act was presented to Victor Emmanuel II and one week later, on 25 March 1860, the Brigade "Ferrara" and its two regiments were formally incorporated into the Royal Sardinian Army.

On 5 May 1860, Giuseppe Garibaldi's Expedition of the Thousand set off from Genoa and landed on 11 May in Marsala in Sicily. On 15 May 1860, Garibaldi won the Battle of Calatafimi and the Sardinian government decided to send reinforcements to Sicily. As the Brigade "Ferrara" consisted entirely of volunteers, which were eager to join Garibaldi in Sicily, the entire personnel of the brigade was released from service on 20 May. Most men of the brigade then joined the expedition of Giacomo Medici, which departed for Sicily in the nights between 8 and 10 June 1860. The Brigade "Ferrara" was immediately reformed, with the uneven numbered infantry regiments, from 3rd Infantry Regiment to 27th Infantry Regiment, ceding their 4th Company to help reform the 47th Infantry Regiment, while the even numbered infantry regiments, from 4th Infantry Regiment to 28th Infantry Regiment, ceded their 4th Company to help reform the 48th Infantry Regiment.

=== Third Italian War of Independence ===
After the successful conclusion of Garibaldi's Expedition of the Thousand the Kingdom of Sardinia annexed the Kingdom of the Two Sicilies. On 17 March 1861, King Victor Emmanuel II proclaimed himself King of Italy. In 1862, the Brigade "Ferrara" moved to Sicily, where the brigade operated in the Western half of the island to suppress the anti-Sardinian revolt, which had erupted in Southern Italy after the annexation of the Kingdom of the Two Sicilies.

On 1 August 1862, the two regiments of the Brigade "Ferrara" ceded their 17th Company and 18th Company to help form the 66th Infantry Regiment (Brigade "Valtellina"). In 1866, the Brigade "Ferrara" participated in the Third Italian War of Independence. On 25 October 1871, the brigade level was abolished, and the two regiments of the Brigade "Ferrara" were renamed 47th Infantry Regiment "Ferrara", respectively 48th Infantry Regiment "Ferrara". On 2 January 1881, the brigade level was reintroduced, and the two regiments were renamed again as 47th Infantry Regiment (Brigade "Ferrara") and 48th Infantry Regiment (Brigade "Ferrara"). On 1 November 1884, the 48th Infantry Regiment ceded some of its companies to help form the 86th Infantry Regiment (Brigade "Verona") in Novi Ligure. In 1895–96, the regiment provided seven officers and 284 enlisted for units deployed to Italian Eritrea for the First Italo-Ethiopian War.

In December 1908, the regiment was deployed to the area of the Strait of Messina for the recovery efforts after the 1908 Messina earthquake. For its service the regiment was awarded a Silver Medal of Merit, which was affixed to the regiment's flag. In 1911–12, the regiment provided 13 officers and 1,406 enlisted for units deployed to Libya for the Italo-Turkish War.

=== World War I ===
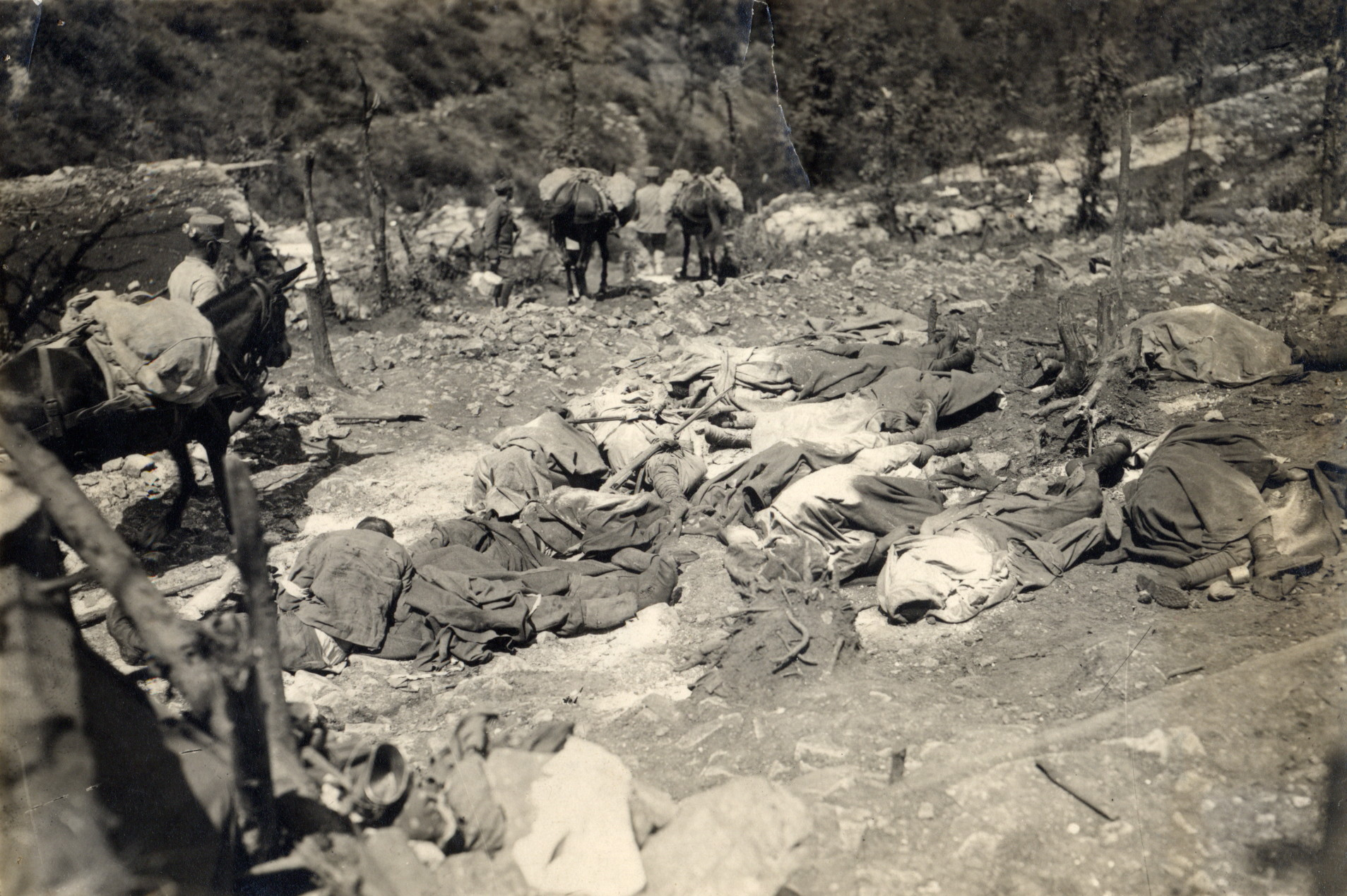
Dead soldiers of the Brigade "Ferrara" dead after the Austro-Hungarian poison gas attack on 29 June 1916

At the outbreak of World War I, the Brigade "Ferrara" formed, together with the Brigade "Brescia" and the 15th Field Artillery Regiment, the 22nd Division. At the time the 48th Infantry Regiment consisted of three battalions, each of which fielded four fusilier companies and one machine gun section. On 1 March 1915, the depot of the 48th Infantry Regiment in Catanzaro formed the command of the Brigade "Catanzaro" and the 141st Infantry Regiment (Brigade "Catanzaro"). After Italy's entry into the war on 23 May 1915, the Brigade "Ferrara" was deployed on the Karst plateau near Polazzo, where the brigade fought in June and July 1915 in the First Battle of the Isonzo. From 18 July to 3 August 1918, the brigade fought again near Polazzo in the Second Battle of the Isonzo. After a break the brigade returned to the Karst plateau on 7 November 1915. This time the brigade was deployed on Monte San Michele On 10 November 1915, the Fourth Battle of the Isonzo began and the brigade attacked Austrian lines near San Martino del Carso. By 23 November, the brigade had suffered 1,400 casualties and was sent to the rear. In December 1915, the 48th Infantry Regiment's depot in Catanzaro formed the 221st Infantry Regiment, which was assigned in April 1916 to the newly formed Brigade "Ionio".

On 1 March 1916, the depot of the 47th Infantry Regiment in Lecce formed the command of the Brigade "Udine" and the 95th Infantry Regiment (Brigade "Udine"), while the depot of the 48th Infantry Regiment in Catanzaro formed the 96th Infantry Regiment (Brigade "Udine"). From 9 to 15 March 1916, the brigade fought in the Fifth Battle of the Isonzo on Monte San Michele. On 29 June 1916, Austro-Hungarian troops attacked the line held by the I Battalion of the 19th Infantry Regiment (Brigade "Brescia"), II Battalion of the 20th Infantry Regiment (Brigade "Brescia"), II and III battalions of the 30th Infantry Regiment (Brigade "Pisa") and 48th Infantry Regiment with a mix of phosgene and chlorine gas. More than 1,000 soldiers of the Brigade "Ferrara" died in the attack, but troops of the 47th Infantry Regiment managed to prevent an Austro-Hungarian breakthrough. In August 1916, the brigade fought in the Sixth Battle of the Isonzo, during which Italian troops finally conquered the summit of Monte San Michele. The brigade then attacked from Opatje Selo towards the hill of Pečinka, but failed to take it. By the end of the battle the brigade had suffered more than 2,700 casualties and was sent to the rear to be rebuilt. Already in September the brigade returned to the Karst plateau for the Seventh Battle of the Isonzo, during which it attacked from Opatje Selo towards Kostanjevica na Krasu. After suffering more than 1,1000 casualties the brigade had to be sent to the rear once more. In October and November 1916 the brigade participated in the Eighth Battle of the Isonzo and the Ninth Battle of the Isonzo, both times attacking towards Kostanjevica na Krasu again. During the latter battle the brigade lost another 1,400 men and was taken out of the line again.

On 7 February 1917, the brigade returned to the Karst frontline between Pečinka and Fajti hrib. The brigade then fought in the Tenth Battle of the Isonzo. In August 1917, the brigade was transferred Avče, where it fought in the Eleventh Battle of the Isonzo on the Banjšice plateau. After suffering nearly 1,500 casualties the brigade had to be sent to the rear on 26 August to be rebuilt once more. Already on 12 September 1917, the brigade was sent into action again, this time on the hill of Škabrijel, where the brigade lost more than 1,800 men. Consequently, the brigade had to be taken out of the line on 30 September and was sent to the rear to be rebuilt. On 24 October 1917, Austro-Hungarian forces broke through the Italian lines in the Battle of Caporetto. The next day the brigade was sent to Purgessimo to try to slow down the enemy's advance. On 27 October, the brigade encountered the Austro-Hungarian spearheads, and by evening the brigade had to retreat towards Beivars. On 3 November, the remnants of the brigade, which had suffered more than 2,500 casualties in less than a week, crossed the Piaveriver. The brigade, like so many times before, was sent to the rear to be rebuilt.

On 15 June 1918, the Austro-Hungarian Army attempted to cross the Piave river in the Second Battle of the Piave River. After a five-hour artillery barrage Austro-Hungarian troops crossed the river at Zenson di Piave, where the 48th Infantry Regiment held the first line. The 47th Infantry Regiment was sent forward in support, however by 17 June the brigade, which had suffered almost 2,700 casualties, had to fall back from the river bank. On 20 June 1918, the brigade was sent to Mestre in the rear to be rebuilt once more. In October 1918, the brigade participated in the decisive Battle of Vittorio Veneto, during which the 47th Infantry Regiment crossed the Piave at Sabbionera and from where it pursued the fleeing Austro-Hungarians to Motta di Livenza and the Madrisio on the Tagliamento river.

Over the course of the war the 47th Infantry Regiment suffered 12,355 casualties, while the 48th Infantry Regiment had 13,769 casualties. In total the Brigade "Ferrara" suffered the third highest number of casualties of all Italian infantry brigades. For their conduct, bravery, and sacrifice during the war, especially during the first day of the Second Battle of the Piave River both regiments of the Brigade "Ferrara" were awarded Italy's highest military honor a Gold Medal of Military Valor. The medals were affixed to the two regiments' flags and added to their coat of arms.

=== Interwar years ===
At the end of 1920 the 48th Infantry Regiment moved from Catanzaro to newly annexed city Trieste, but after a few month the regiment moved to Opatija. In 1922 the regiment returned to the South of Italy and was then based in Taranto. On 30 September 1926, the command of the Brigade "Ferrara" and the 48th Infantry Regiment were disbanded, while the 47th Infantry Regiment was renamed 47th Infantry Regiment "Ferrara" and assigned to the XXIII Infantry Brigade. The XXIII Infantry Brigade, which had been formed by renaming the Brigade "Regina", was the infantry component of the 23rd Territorial Division of Bari, which also included the 14th Field Artillery Regiment. The XXIII Infantry Brigade also included the 9th Infantry Regiment "Regina", which was based on the island of Rhodes in the Italian Islands of the Aegean, and 10th Infantry Regiment "Regina", which was based in Bari.

In 1934, the 9th Infantry Regiment "Regina" was transferred to the newly formed Aegean Military Command. On 1 October 1934, the XXIII Infantry Brigade reformed the 39th Infantry Regiment "Bologna" in Salerno as replacement. In same year the 23rd Territorial Division of Bari was renamed 23rd Infantry Division "Murge". A name change that also extended to the division's infantry brigade. On 7 April 1937, the 10th Infantry Regiment "Regina" was transferred to the Aegean Military Command and moved from Bari to Rhodes. Consequently the 48th Infantry Regiment "Ferrara" was reformed on 1 July 1937 in Bari as replacement. On 28 March 1939, the command of the XXIII Infantry Brigade "Murge" was disbanded and the 47th Infantry Regiment "Ferrara", 48th Infantry Regiment "Ferrara", and 39th Infantry Regiment "Bologna" came under direct command of the 23rd Infantry Division "Murge", which also included the 14th Artillery Regiment "Murge".

=== Invasion of Albania ===
On 7 April 1939, the 23rd Infantry Division "Murge" participated in the Italian invasion of Albania. The division's troops landed in Durrës and in the following two days occupied Vlorë, Fier, Tepelenë, and the oil fields at Patos-Marinza and Kuçova. On 25 April 1939, the division's headquarter arrived in Gjirokastër, while the division's units took up residence in Berat, Tepelenë, Këlcyrë and Përmet. The division had left the 39th Infantry Regiment "Bologna" in Italy, which on 27th April 1939 was transferred to the 25th Infantry Division "Bologna". On 24 May 1939, the 23rd Infantry Division "Murge" was renamed 23rd Infantry Division "Ferrara". On 15 September 1939, the depots of the "Ferrara" division in Southern Italy formed the 47th Infantry Division "Bari" as replacement for the "Ferrara" division, as the latter was now permanently based in the Italian protectorate of Albania.

=== World War II ===
At the outbreak of World War II, the 48th Infantry Regiment "Ferrara" consisted of a command, a command company, three fusilier battalions, a support weapons battery equipped with 65/17 infantry support guns, and a mortar company equipped with 81mm Mod. 35 mortars.

==== Greco-Italian War ====
On 28 October 1940, Italy invaded Greece, which started the Greco-Italian War. At the outbreak of the war the "Ferrara" was deployed from the Aoös valley to the Mal Stugarë mountain. The division was ordered to advance from Gjirokastër in Albania to Kalpaki and then Ioannina in Greece. On 30 October 1940, the division crossed into Greek territory near Kakavia and captured the railroad junction at Kalpaki, but failed to dislodge the town's Greek garrison. Greek resistance, initially weak, grew rapidly, and the "Ferrara" division's advance came to a halt due to enemy resistance and the weather turning the few passable roads and trails into muddy traps. On 5 November 1940, the Italians fought their way across the Thyamis river and into the town of Chrisorrachi a few kilometres to the South of Kalpaki, but were stopped 500 metres from city center on 6 November 1940. The Greek, reinforced by aviation and artillery, counter-attacked on 6–7 November 1940 and on 10 November the defence of the Ferrara failed in several places. By 14 November parts of the division were nearly surrounded, and the Ferrara started to retreat on 16 November 1940. The division moved back to the Delvinaki-Fitóki Potamós line. Attacks and counter-attacks continued with the increasing odds against Italians, until the entire left flank of the Ferrara was defeated 20 November 1940. At this point, the remnants of division held only a small sliver of Greek territory near Vesania and were ordered to retreat from the increasingly untenable positions in the Pontikates area. On 26 November 1940 these positions were abandoned and the remnants of the Ferrara were pushed southwards and out of Greece towards the Drino river. The division made a stand at Radat, but suffered a severe defeat there on 27 November 1940, and was relieved by the 37th Infantry Division "Modena" on 3 December 1940.

The Ferrara was sent to Gjirokastër to be rebuilt, but soon had to return to the front as rearguard for the defeated "Modena" division. On 6–7 December 1940, the "Ferrara" division fought a defensive battle south of Tepelenë, at the confluence of the Aoös and Drino rivers. On 14–16 December 1940, Greek forces captured the dominant height of Maja e Buzë Derrit, forcing the Ferrara to undertake costly counter-attacks until the height was re-captured. On 21 January 1941, the Greeks renewed their attacks and until the 58th Infantry Division "Legnano" arrived on 27 January the Italians lost a number of positions. The arrival of Italian reinforcements stabilized the situation and resulted in a gradual reduction of military activities during February 1941.

On 6 April 1941, Germany invaded Greece and on 16 April 1941, the Italians went on the offensive. The "Ferrara" division began its advance near the height of Maja e Buzë Derrit. The division quickly captured positions in the Drino valley, reaching soon the Gjirokastër-Libohovë line where it stayed until August 1941. For its service and sacrifice on the Greek front between 28 October 1940 and 23 April 1941 the 47th Infantry Regiment "Ferrara" and 48th Infantry Regiment "Ferrara" were both awarded a Gold Medal of Military Valor, which were affixed to the two regiments' flags and added to their coat of arms.

==== Montenegro ====
In August 1941, the "Ferrara" division was transferred to Vlorë-Tirana-Elbasan area in Albania. In the beginning of January, 1942, the division was tasked with coastal defence duty in a sector from ranging from the Seman river to Durrës. In April 1942, the division was transferred to Montenegro, with headquarters in Nikšić and later in Cetinje. The division's units were based in Danilovgrad, Podgorica, and Šavnik. Between 14 May and 16 June 1943, the division participated in Operation Schwarz against Yugoslav partisans in northern Montenegro. After the announcement of the Armistice of Cassibile on 8 September 1943 the "Ferrara" division and its units were disbanded by invading German forces.

=== Cold War ===
On 1 July 1958, the 48th Infantry Regiment "Ferrara" was reformed by renaming the existing 9th Recruits Training Center in Bari. The regiment consisted of command, a command company, and three recruit battalions. In 1961, the regiment detached its I Battalion to Cosenza, where the battalion became an autonomous unit and was renamed Recruits Training Battalion "Sila". On 1 July 1963, the 52nd Infantry Regiment "Alpi" transferred its I Battalion and II Battalion to the 48th Infantry Regiment "Ferrara", which renumbered the two battalions as III Battalion, respectively IV Battalion, with the latter battalion being detached in the city of Barletta. On 1 August 1965, the regiment added the V Battalion, when the Recruits Training Battalion based in Potenza was assigned to the regiment. On 15 April 1967, the regiment ceded its the command of its III Battalion and one of its training companies to help form the Recruits Training Battalion "Chieti" in Chieti. Afterwards the regiment consisted of the following units:

- 48th Infantry Regiment "Ferrara", in Bari
  - Command and Services Company, in Bari
  - I Battalion, in Bari
  - II Battalion, in Campobasso
  - III Battalion, in Potenza
  - IV Battalion, in Barletta

On 31 March 1975, the regiment's II Battalion was disbanded. During the 1975 army reform, the army disbanded the regimental level and newly independent battalions were granted for the first time their own flags. On 14 November 1975, the 48th Infantry Regiment "Ferrara" was disbanded and the next day the regiment's I Battalion became an autonomous unit and was renamed 48th Infantry Battalion "Ferrara". On the same day the commands of the regiment's III Battalion and IV Battalion were disbanded, with the companies of the III Battalion in Potenza becoming a detachment of the 244th Infantry Battalion "Cosenza", and the companies of the IV Battalion in Barletta becoming a detachment of the 48th Infantry Battalion "Ferrara". The 48th Infantry Battalion "Ferrara" was tasked with training recruits destined for the support units of the 5th Army Corps and consisted of a command, a command platoon, and six recruit companies, two of which were detached in Barletta. On 12 November 1976, the President of the Italian Republic Giovanni Leone assigned with decree 846 the flag and traditions of the 48th Infantry Regiment "Ferrara" to the 48th Infantry Battalion "Ferrara".

On 1 February 1977, the detachment of the 48th Infantry Battalion "Ferrara" in Barletta became an autonomous unit and was renamed 47th Infantry Battalion "Salento". On 31 January 1987, the battalion disbanded its 4th Company.

=== Recent times ===
After the end of the Cold War the Italian Army began to draw down its forces. On 16 January 1991, the 48th Infantry Battalion "Ferrara" transferred the flag of the 48th Infantry Regiment "Ferrara" to the Shrine of the Flags in the Vittoriano in Rome and on 31 January 1991 the battalion was disbanded.
