= 30th Infantry Regiment "Pisa" =

Inactive Italian Army infantry unit

- 30° Reggimento Fanteria "Pisa"
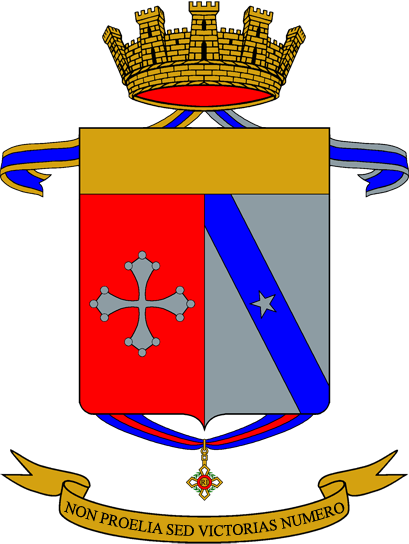
- Regimental coat of arms
- Active: 5 May 1859 – 8 Sept. 1943; 1 Oct. 1975 – 24 Sept. 1991
- Country: Italy
- Branch: Italian Army
- Part of: Mechanized Brigade "Brescia"
- Garrison/HQ: Montorio Veronese
- Motto: "Non proelia sed victorias numero"
- Anniversaries: 28 October 1918 – Battle of Sernaglia
- Decorations: 1× Military Order of Italy; 1× Gold Medal of Military Valor; 1× Silver Medal of Military Valor

Insignia
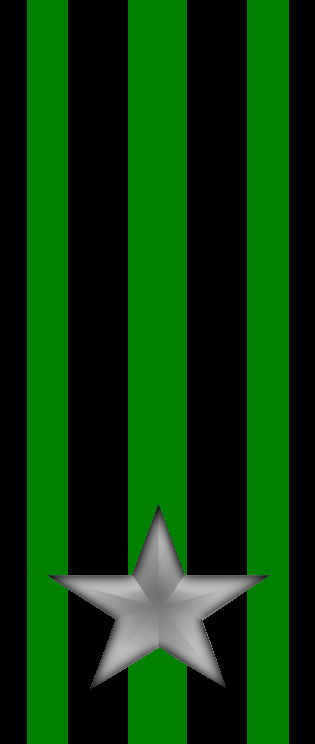
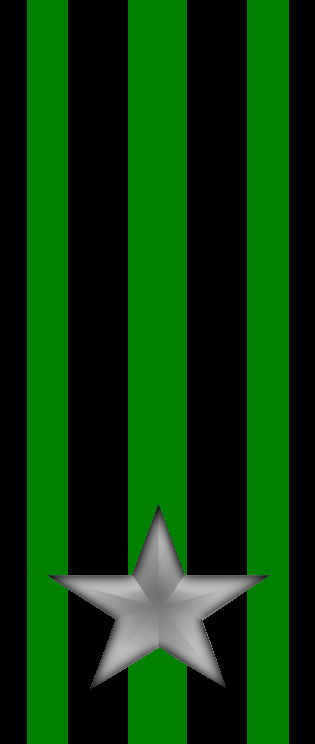
- Regimental gorget patches

The 30th Infantry Regiment "Pisa" (Italian: 30° Reggimento Fanteria "Pisa") is an inactive unit of the Italian Army last based in Montorio Veronese. The regiment is named for the city of Pisa and part of the Italian Army's infantry arm. The regiment was one of five line infantry regiments formed by the Provisional Government of Tuscany on 5 May 1859 during the Second Italian War of Independence. In 1860, the regiment joined the Royal Sardinian Army. In 1866, the 30th Infantry Regiment participated in the Third Italian War of Independence and in 1911–12, it fought in the Italo-Turkish War. In World War I the regiment fought on the Italian front.

During World War II, the regiment was assigned to the 26th Infantry Division "Assietta", with which it fought in 1940 in the Italian invasion of France and in 1941 in the Invasion of Yugoslavia. In 1942, the "Assietta" division was sent to Sicily, where the division and its regiments suffered heavy losses during the allied Operation Husky in July 1943. The remnants of the division returned to their bases in Piedmont, where the division was disbanded by invading German forces after the announcement of the Armistice of Cassibile on 8 September 1943.

In 1975, the regiment's flag and traditions were assigned to the 30th Mechanized Infantry Battalion "Pisa", which was assigned to the Mechanized Brigade "Brescia". In 1991, the battalion was disbanded and the flag of the 30th Infantry Regiment "Pisa" transferred to the Shrine of the Flags in the Vittoriano in Rome. The regiment's anniversary falls on 28 October 1918, the day during the Battle of Vittorio Veneto the 30th Infantry Regiment firmly established a bridgehead at Sernaglia on the Northern side of the Piave river, after having crossed the river as one of the first Italian units the day before. For this the regiment was awarded Italy's highest military honor a Gold Medal of Military Valor.

== History ==
=== Formation ===
On 21 July 1858, French Emperor Napoleon III and the Prime Minister of Sardinia Camillo Benso, Count of Cavour met in Plombières and reached a secret verbal agreement on a military alliance between the Second French Empire and the Kingdom of Sardinia against the Austrian Empire. On 26 January 1859, Napoleon III signed the Franco-Sardinian Treaty, followed by King Victor Emmanuel II on 29 January 1859. On 9 March 1859, Sardinia mobilized its army, followed by Austria on 9 April. On 23 April, Austria delivered an ultimatum to Sardinia demanding its demobilization. Upon Sardinia's refusal, Austria declared war on 26 April and three days later the Austrians crossed the Ticino river into Piedmont. Consequently, France honored its alliance with Sardinia and declared war on Austria on 3 May 1859.

On 27 April 1859, Leopold II, Grand Duke of Tuscany refused popular demands to join the war against Austria, which led to an uprising in Florence, the capital of the Grand Duchy of Tuscany. As the Tuscan Army sided with the people, Leopold II fled the same day to the Austrian garrison in Bologna in the Papal Legations of the Romagne. The evening of the same day, 27 April 1859, the city council of Florence formed the Provisional Government of Tuscany, which was led by Ubaldino Peruzzi, Vincenzo Malenchini, and Alessandro Danzini. The next day Victor Emmanuel II nominated the Sardinian ambassador in Florence Carlo Bon Compagni di Mombello as new head of state of the Grand Duchy.

On 5 May 1859, the Provisional Government of Tuscany issued a decree to reorganize the infantry of the Army of the Grand Duchy of Tuscany. At the time the Tuscan infantry consisted of ten line infantry battalions and the Velites Battalion, which fielded grenadier troops. Consequently, five line regiments and one grenadier regiment were formed:

- Grenadier Regiment, formed by the Velites Battalion and other units
- 1st Line Regiment, formed by the VII Line Battalion and IX Line Battalion
- 2nd Line Regiment, formed by the V Line Battalion and X Line Battalion
- 3rd Line Regiment, formed by the VI Line Battalion and VIII Line Battalion
- 4th Line Regiment, formed by the I Line Battalion and III Line Battalion
- 5th Line Regiment, formed by the II Line Battalion and IV Line Battalion

On 23 May 1859, the 5th French Corps landed in Livorno and on 29 May the Grand Duchy of Tuscany joined the Franco-Sardinian alliance against Austria. On 18 June 1859, three volunteer battalions were used to form the 1st Jäger Regiment. On 2 July 1859, the 1st and 2nd line regiments, and the 3rd and 4th line regiments were grouped into two brigades. On 12 July 1859, the Second Italian War of Independence ended with the Armistice of Villafranca, which called for the rulers of the Grand Duchy of Tuscany, the Duchy of Modena and Reggio, and the Duchy of Parma and Piacenza, which all had fled their nations, to be restored to their thrones. However neither Sardinia nor the Sardinian installed governments in the three nations wished for a return of the rulers.

On 23 October 1859, the 1st Jäger Regiment was reorganized as 6th Line Regiment and grouped, together with the 5th Line Regiment, in a newly formed brigade. On 4 November 1859, the brigade, which consisted of the 1st and 2nd line regiments, was renamed Brigade "Pisa", while the brigade, which consisted of the 3rd and 4th line regiments, was renamed Brigade "Siena". On the same date, the brigade, which consisted of the 5th and 6th line regiments, was renamed Brigade "Livorno". On 30 December 1859, the Tuscan regiments took their place in the progressive numerical order of the regiments of the Royal Sardinian Army and were renumbered as follows:

- Brigade "Pisa"
  - 1st Line Regiment – 29th Infantry Regiment (Brigade "Pisa")
  - 2nd Line Regiment – 30th Infantry Regiment (Brigade "Pisa")
- Brigade "Siena"
  - 3rd Line Regiment – 31st Infantry Regiment (Brigade "Siena")
  - 4th Line Regiment – 32nd Infantry Regiment (Brigade "Siena")
- Brigade "Livorno"
  - 5th Line Regiment – 33rd Infantry Regiment (Brigade "Livorno")
  - 6th Line Regiment – 34th Infantry Regiment (Brigade "Livorno")

At the same time it was decided to form a fourth Tuscan brigade, which would consist of the 35th and 36th infantry regiments. On 17 January 1860, the 35th Infantry Regiment was formed in Livorno by reorganizing the Grenadier Regiment, which on the same date received the I Battalion of the 32nd Infantry Regiment (Brigade "Siena"). The following 27 January, the 36th Infantry Regiment was formed in Florence, which received the II Battalion of the former Grenadier Regiment and the III Battalion of the 31st Infantry Regiment (Brigade "Siena"). On the same date, 27 January 1860, the two new regiments were assigned to the newly formed Brigade "Pistoia". On 11 and 12 March 1860, the Royal Provinces of Emilia and the Grand Duchy of Tuscany voted in a plebiscite for annexation by the Kingdom of Sardinia. On 18 March 1860, the annexation act was presented to Victor Emmanuel II and one week later, on 25 March 1860, the four Tuscan brigades were formally incorporated into the Royal Sardinian Army.

=== Third Italian War of Independence ===
On 1 August 1862, the 30th Infantry Regiment (Brigade "Pisa") ceded its 17th Company and 18th Company to help form the 72nd Infantry Regiment (Brigade "Puglie"). In 1866, the Brigade "Pisa" participated in the Third Italian War of Independence, during which the brigade fought in the Battle of Custoza. On 25 October 1871, the brigade level was abolished, and the two regiments of the Brigade "Pisa" were renamed 29th Infantry Regiment "Pisa", respectively 30th Infantry Regiment "Pisa". On 2 January 1881, the brigade level was reintroduced, and the two regiments were renamed again as 29th Infantry Regiment (Brigade "Pisa") and 30th Infantry Regiment (Brigade "Pisa").

On 1 November 1884, the 30th Infantry Regiment ceded some of its companies to help form the 84th Infantry Regiment (Brigade "Venezia"). In 1895–96, the regiment provided four officers and 115 enlisted for units deployed to Italian Eritrea for the First Italo-Ethiopian War. In 1912, the 30th Infantry Regiment was deployed to Tobruk in Libya for the Italo-Turkish War. In 1913, the regiment remained in Libya to fight against local rebels.

=== World War I ===
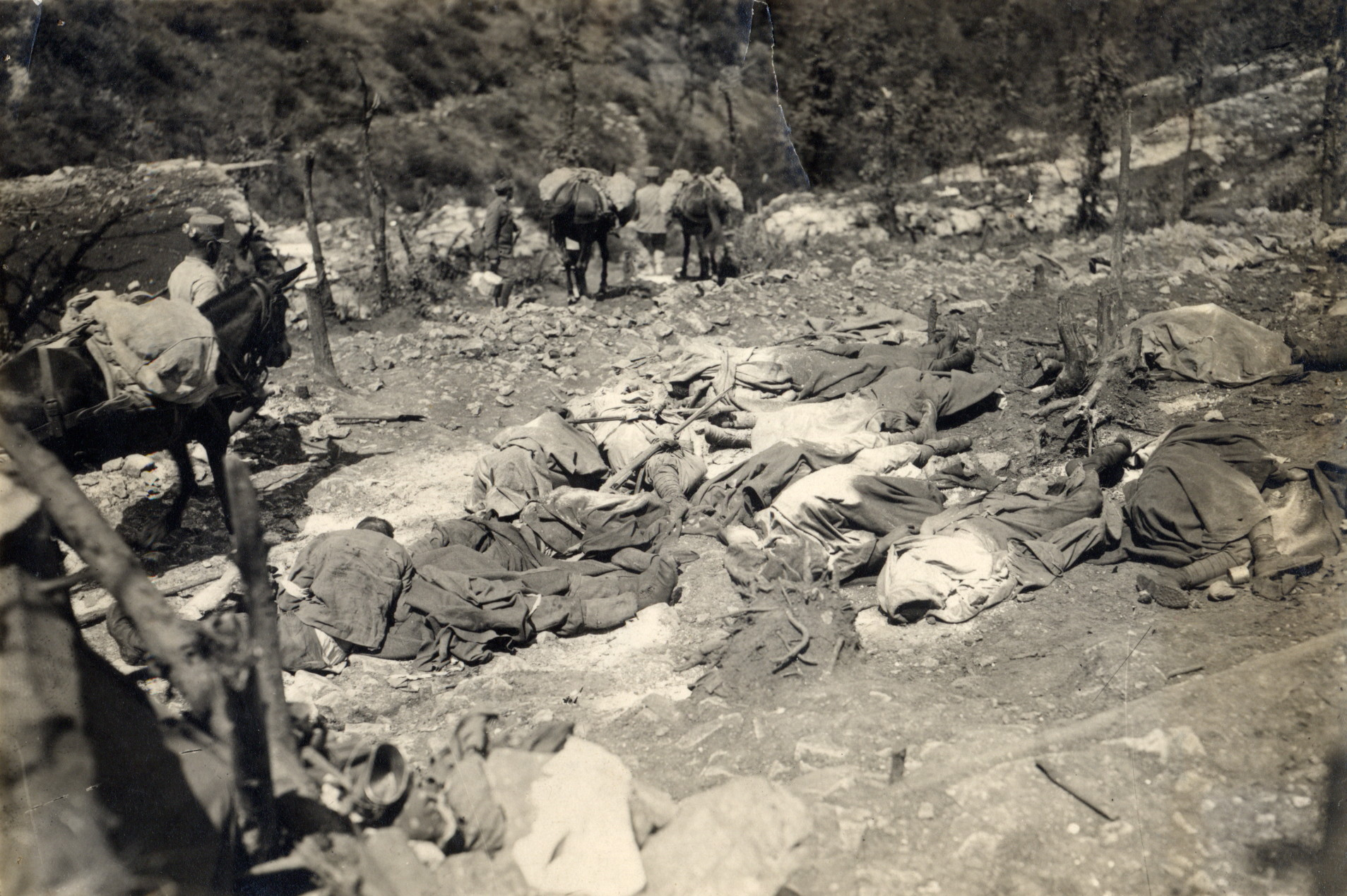
Dead soldiers of the Brigade "Ferrara" dead after the Austro-Hungarian poison gas attack on 29 June 1916

At the outbreak of World War I, the Brigade "Pisa" formed, together with the Brigade "Regina" and the 35th Field Artillery Regiment, the 21st Division. At the time the 30th Infantry Regiment consisted of three battalions, each of which fielded four fusilier companies and one machine gun section. After Italy's entry into the war on 23 May 1915, the Brigade "Pisa" was deployed in Versa on the border with the Austro-Hungarian Empire. On 5 June 1915, the brigade crossed the border and occupied Gradisca d'Isonzo. During the First Battle of the Isonzo the brigade crossed the Isonzo river at Sagrado and established a bridgehead below Monte San Michele. On 30 June 1915, a first attempt to storm the Monte San Michele failed. In July 1915, during the Second Battle of the Isonzo, the brigade tried again to storm the Monte San Michele, but after suffering more than 1,200 casualties the brigade was sent to the rear. On 1 November 1915, during the Third Battle of the Isonzo, the 30th Infantry Regiment was ordered to attack uphill from Sdraussina to San Martino del Carso, but the attack failed. The brigade was then sent to the Bosco Cappuccio woods below San Martino del Carso, where the brigade fought during the Fourth Battle of the Isonzo. However the brigade's attacks on 10, 11, 12, 18, 19, 20, 21, 22, and 23 November were all beaten back by the Austro-Hungarian troops and cost the brigade more than 1,000 casualties. On 10 December 1915, the depot of the 30th Infantry Regiment in Nocera Inferiore helped form the 219th Infantry Regiment, which on 23 March 1916 was assigned to the newly formed Brigade "Sele".

In March 1916, the brigade was again below San Martino del Carso for the Fifth Battle of the Isonzo. On 29 June 1916, Austro-Hungarian troops attacked the line held by the I Battalion of the 19th Infantry Regiment (Brigade "Brescia"), II Battalion of the 20th Infantry Regiment (Brigade "Brescia"), the 48th Infantry Regiment (Brigade "Ferrara"), and the 30th Infantry Regiment's II and III battalion with a mix of phosgene and chlorine gas. The 30th Infantry Regiment's surviving troops abandoned the first Italian trench line and only a counterattack by the rest of the Brigade "Pisa" and the Brigade "Regina" stabilized the line. On this day, the Brigade "Pisa" suffered 447 killed in action, 222 wound in action, and 934 missing in action. The brigade was taken out of the line and sent to the rear to be rebuilt. In August 1916, the brigade was again below San Martino del Carso for the Sixth Battle of the Isonzo, but this time the brigade broke through the Austro-Hungarian lines and advanced onto the Karst plateau and pushed the enemy back to the Pečinka. The brigade, which had suffered 1,700 casualties, remained in the first line for the Seventh Battle of the Isonzo, which began on 14 September 1916, and for the Eighth Battle of the Isonzo, which began on 10 October 1916. For their conduct during the first two year of the war, especially in the battles below San Martino del Carso, the two regiments of the Brigade "Pisa" were both awarded a Silver Medal of Military Valor. The medals were affixed to the regiments' flags and added to their coat of arms.

On 30 January 1917, the depot of the 30th Infantry Regiment formed the 244th Infantry Regiment for the Brigade "Cosenza", which had been formed on eight days earlier on 22 January 1917. In May 1917, the Brigade "Pisa" was back on the Karst plateau for the Tenth Battle of the Isonzo, during which the brigade attacked towards the Fajtji hrib hill and suffered more than 1,300 casualties. Afterwards the brigade was sent to the Asiago plateau, where the it occupied positions near Camporovere. The brigade remained in the Camporovere sector until the Battle of Caporetto forced the Italians to retreat behind the Piave river. On 10 November, the Brigade "Pisa" fell back to a new line from Cima Ekar to Monte Valbella and Zaibena, while the 30th Infantry Regiment's I and II battalions were sent to Monte Sisemol. But already on the morning of the same day Austro-Hungarian troops took the summit of Monte Sisemol, which was retaken in the afternoon by the two battalions of the 30th Infantry Regiment. On 13 November 1917, the Austro-Hungarians tried again to take the summit of Monte Sisemol, but the attack was beaten back by the 30th Infantry Regiment.

On 17 June 1918, during the Second Battle of the Piave River, the Brigade "Pisa" was transferred to the Piave front. On 19 June 1918, the brigade attacked the Austro-Hungarian bridgehead on the Northeastern side of the Montello hill. After two days of heavy fighting the brigade had driven the Austro-Hungarians off the hill, which forced the enemy to retreat back over the Piave river. In October 1918, the brigade returned to the Montello for the Battle of Vittorio Veneto. On 24 October 1918, the battle began and during the night of the 26 to 27 October the 30th Infantry Regiment became one of the first Italian unit to cross the Piave river. Around noon on the 27th the battalions of the 30th Infantry Regiment reached Sernaglia, which the regiment defended against an Austro-Hungarian counterattack. On 29 October 1918, the brigade advanced to Solighetto and Pieve di Soligo and from there pursued the retreating enemy to Follina.

For its conduct and bravery during the second half of the war, especially during the crossing of the Piave river, the 30th Infantry Regiment was awarded a Gold Medal of Military Valor, which was affixed to the regiment's flag and added to its coat of arms.

=== Interwar years ===
In October 1926, the Brigade "Pisa" was renamed XXVI Infantry Brigade. The brigade was the infantry component of the 26th Territorial Division of Salerno, which also included the 25th Field Artillery Regiment. At the same time the brigade's two infantry regiments were renamed 29th Infantry Regiment "Pisa" and 30th Infantry Regiment "Pisa". On 5 November 1926, the 63rd Infantry Regiment "Cagliari" was assigned to the XXVI Infantry Brigade. In 1929, the 29th Infantry Regiment "Pisa" moved from Potenza to Asti, followed on 30 March 1930 by the 26th Territorial Division of Salerno, which moved from Salerno in the South of Italy to Asti and consequently changed its name to 26th Territorial Division of Asti. During the same year the 30th Infantry Regiment "Pisa" moved from Nocera Inferiore to Tortona, while the 63rd Infantry Regiment "Cagliari" moved from Salerno to Vercelli. In 1931, the 25th Field Artillery Regiment moved from Nola to Asti.

On 8 February 1934, the division changed its name to 26th Infantry Division "Assietta". A name change that also extended to the division's infantry brigade. On 1 April 1934, the division transferred the 30th Infantry Regiment "Pisa" to the 3rd Territorial Division of Alessandria, which in turn transferred the 38th Infantry Regiment "Ravenna" to the "Assietta" division. In 1935, the 26th Infantry Division "Assietta" was mobilized for the Second Italo-Ethiopian War. On 15 December 1935, the division with the 38th Infantry Regiment "Ravenna", 63rd Infantry Regiment "Cagliari", and 25th Field Artillery Regiment arrived in Libya. In January 1936, the division was shipped to Eritrea in January 1936, while the 25th Field Artillery Regiment remained in Libya. The 30th Infantry Regiment "Pisa" remained in Italy and provided 17 officers and 240 troops to units deployed to East Africa for the war.

On 25 March 1939, the division transferred the 38th Infantry Regiment "Ravenna" to the III Infantry Brigade "Monferrato" and received the 30th Infantry Regiment "Pisa" in turn. On 5 April 1939, the 63rd Infantry Regiment "Cagliari" left the 26th Infantry Division "Assietta" and joined the newly formed 59th Infantry Division "Cagliari". On the same date the XXVI Infantry Brigade "Assietta" was disbanded and the 29th and 30th infantry regiments came under direct command of the "Assietta" division. Furthermore, the 29th Infantry Regiment "Pisa" and 30th Infantry Regiment "Pisa" were renamed 29th Infantry Regiment "Assietta" respectively 30th Infantry Regiment "Assietta", while the 25th Field Artillery Regiment was renamed 25th Artillery Regiment "Assietta".

=== World War II ===
At the outbreak of World War II, the 30th Infantry Regiment "Assietta" consisted of a command, a command company, three fusilier battalions, a support weapons battery equipped with 65/17 infantry support guns, and a mortar company equipped with 81mm Mod. 35 mortars. On 10 June 1940 the "Assietta" was deployed in the area of the mountains Rochers Charniers, Grand Queyron, Mont Chaberton, the pass of Col de Montgenèvre, and in the Thuras valley the Italian invasion of France. On 18 June 1940, the division crossed into French territory and on 22–23 June captured the Mount Chenaillet and mount Sommet des Anges fortified areas. On 25 June 1940, the Franco-Italian Armistice was signed and the division returned to its bases in Piedmont. On 6 April 1941, the "Assietta" division was in Ajdovščina near the border with Yugoslavia for the upcoming invasion of Yugoslavia. After the collapse of the Yugoslav Army the division moved its headquarters to Delnice on 20 April 1941, performing mopping-up operations in the Gerovo-Karlovac-Lokve region. On 6 May 1941, the division moved to Ilirska Bistrica and nine days later returned to its bases in Piedmont.

In the first half of August 1941 the division was sent to Sicily and assigned to the XII Army Corps in the Western half of the island. On 10 July 1943, the day Allied forces landed in Sicily, the division was in the Santa Ninfa-Partanna area. By 15 July, the division had taken up blocking positions at Lercara Friddi, Prizzi, and Bisacquino in an attempt to block the Allies' advance from Agrigento to Palermo. The rapid crumbling of Axis defences elsewhere meant that these positions had to be abandoned on 16 July 1943 and the division fell back to a new line between Cerda and Sclafani Bagni. On 23 July 1943, the Allies broke through the division's line, which forced the Italians to retreat to Santo Stefano di Camastra and Mistretta. On 29 July 1943, the division tried to stop the Americans at the San Fratello-Troina line. On 6 August 1943, the nearby Battle of Troina concluded and afterwards the American units attacked the already battered "Assietta" division. The initial American armor attack towards San Fratello and Monte Pizzo degli Angeli was repulsed, but on 7 August 1943, the "Assietta" division had to fall back to Tortorici after the Allies had landed troops in the division's rear at Militello Rosmarino. By this time the division was severely crippled by heavy casualties and unfit for battle. What remained of the division retreated to Messina, from where it was evacuated to mainland Italy on 14–18 August 1943. The division then returned to its depots in Piedmont, where, after the announcement of the Armistice of Cassibile on 8 September 1943, it was disbanded by the invading German forces.

=== Cold War ===
During the 1975 army reform, the army disbanded the regimental level and newly independent battalions were granted for the first time their own flags. On 30 September 1975 the 67th Infantry Regiment "Legnano" was disbanded and the next day the regiment's III Battalion in Montorio Veronese became an autonomous unit and was renamed 30th Mechanized Infantry Battalion "Pisa". The battalion was assigned to the Mechanized Brigade "Brescia" and consisted of a command, a command and services company, three mechanized companies with M113 armored personnel carriers, and a heavy mortar company with M106 mortar carriers with 120mm Mod. 63 mortars. At the time the battalion fielded 896 men (45 officers, 100 non-commissioned officers, and 751 soldiers).

On 12 November 1976, the President of the Italian Republic Giovanni Leone assigned with decree 846 the flag and traditions of the 30th Infantry Regiment "Pisa" to the 30th Mechanized Infantry Battalion "Pisa".

=== Recent times ===
After the end of the Cold War Italian Army began to draw down its forces and on 1 May 1991 the 30th Mechanized Infantry Battalion "Pisa" was reorganized as a recruits training battalion and renamed 30th Infantry Battalion "Pisa". The battalion was assigned to the Anti-aircraft Artillery Command and consisted of a command, a command and services company, and two recruit companies. On 24 September 1991, the 30th Infantry Battalion "Pisa" was disbanded and the next day its personnel used to reform the 85th Infantry Regiment "Verona". On 1 October 1991, the flag of the 30th Infantry Regiment "Pisa" was transferred to the Shrine of the Flags in the Vittoriano in Rome.
