= 244th Infantry Regiment "Cosenza" =

Inactive Italian Army infantry unit

- 244° Reggimento Fanteria "Cosenza"
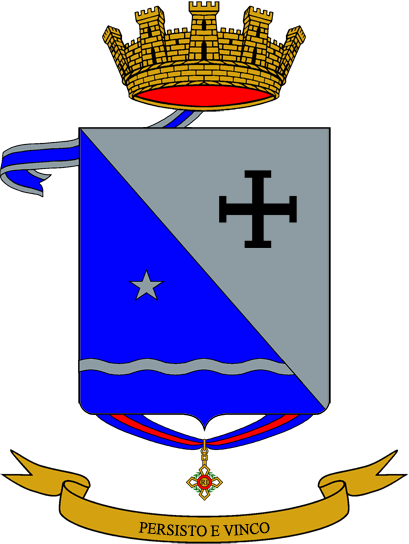
- Regimental coat of arms
- Active: 30 Jan. 1917 – Feb. 1919; 1 June 1935 – 15 Nov. 1936; 15 Nov. 1975 – 31 Dec. 1992
- Country: Italy
- Branch: Italian Army
- Garrison/HQ: Cosenza
- Motto: "Persisto e vinco"
- Anniversaries: 16 June 1918 – Battle of Ponte di Piave
- Decorations: 1× Military Order of Italy; 1× Silver Medal of Military Valor

Insignia
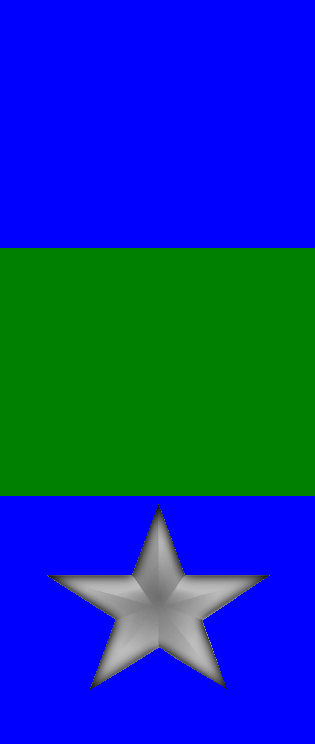
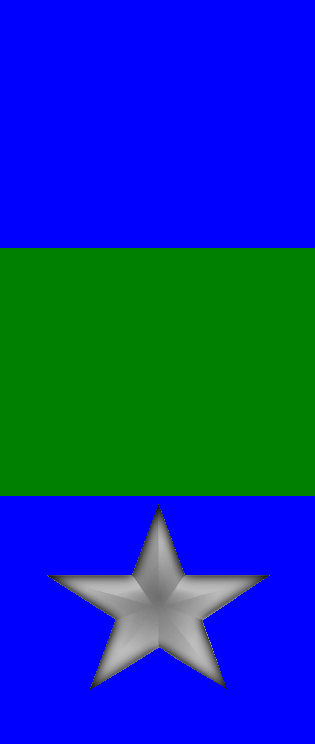
- Regimental gorget patches

The 244th Infantry Regiment "Cosenza" (Italian: 244° Reggimento Fanteria "Cosenza") is an inactive infantry unit of the Italian Army. The regiment is named for the city of Cosenza and part of the Italian Army's infantry arm.

The regiment was formed during World War I and fought on the Italian front. After the war the regiment was disbanded. In 1935 the regiment was reformed in preparation for the Second Italo-Ethiopian War as a replacement unit. In 1936 the regiment was disbanded again. In 1975 the regiment was reformed as a battalion sized training unit in Cosenza. In 1991 the regiment was reformed, but it was disbanded one year later.

== History ==
=== World War I ===
The 244th Infantry Regiment (Brigade "Cosenza") was formed during World War I on 30 January 1917 by the regimental depot of the 30th Infantry Regiment (Brigade "Pisa") in Nocera Inferiore. The regiment was immediately assigned to the Brigade "Cosenza", which had been formed, together with the 243rd Infantry Regiment (Brigade "Cosenza"), on 25 January 1917 by the regimental depot of the 19th Infantry Regiment (Brigade "Brescia") in Cosenza. The regiment consisted of three battalions, which each fielded four fusilier companies and one machine gun section.

The brigade soon departed for the Italian Front, where it fought in May 1917 in the Tenth Battle of the Isonzo on the Karst plateau, and then in August of the same year in the Eleventh Battle of the Isonzo in the area of Korita na Krasu. In June 1918 the brigade fought in the Second Battle of the Piave River, during which it earned a Silver Medal of Military Valor for the defense of Ponte di Piave. In October 1918 the brigade fought in the Battle of Vittorio Veneto in the area of San Dona di Piave.

After the war the brigade and its two regiments were disbanded in February 1919.

=== Second Italo-Ethiopian War ===
In early 1935, the 20th Infantry Regiment "Brescia" was mobilized for the Second Italo-Ethiopian War. As replacement the regiment's depot in Reggio Calabria temporarily reformed on 1 June 1935 the 244th Infantry Regiment "Cosenza". The regiment, together with the 132nd Infantry Regiment "Lazio", 243rd Infantry Regiment "Cosenza", and 45th Artillery Regiment were assigned to the temporarily formed 127th Infantry Division "Sila II". After the war the 127th Infantry Division "Sila II" and its regiments were disbanded on 15 November 1936.

=== Cold War ===
During the 1975 army reform the Italian Army disbanded the regimental level and newly independent battalions were granted for the first time their own flags. On 15 November 1975, the Recruits Training Battalion "Sila" in Cosenza was renamed 244th Infantry Battalion "Cosenza". The battalion was assigned the flag and traditions of the 244th Infantry Regiment "Cosenza". One day earlier, on 14 November 1975, the 48th Infantry Regiment "Ferrara" had been disbanded, and the next day the regiment's III Battalion in Potenza was reduced to a detachment of the 244th Infantry Battalion "Cosenza". The "Cosenza" battalion then consisted of a command, a command platoon, and four recruits training companies, two of which were detached in Potenza. The battalion was assigned to the Southern Military Region – X Territorial Military Command.

On 1 February 1977 the detachment in Potenza became an autonomous unit and was renamed 91st Infantry Battalion "Lucania". On 1 May 1985 the battalion was reorganized and renamed 244th Motorized Infantry Battalion "Cosenza" and consisted now of a command, a command and services company, the 1st Motorized Company, and a heavy mortar company equipped with towed 120mm Mod. 63 mortars. On 1 May 1986 the battalion formed the 2nd Motorized Company, and on 27 October 1987 the 3rd Motorized Company.

On 26 September 1991 the 244th Motorized Infantry Battalion "Cosenza" lost its autonomy and the next day the battalion entered the reformed 244th Motorized Infantry Regiment "Cosenza" as I Motorized Battalion. The regiment consisted of a command, a command and services company, and the I Motorized Battalion with three motorized companies and a heavy mortar company.

After the end of the Cold War the Italian Army began to draw down its forces and the regiment was disbanded on 31 December 1992 after having transferred its flag to the Shrine of the Flags in the Vittoriano in Rome on 18 December 1992. The day after the regiment was disbanded its base was taken over by the 18th Bersaglieri Regiment.
