= 26th Infantry Division "Assietta" =

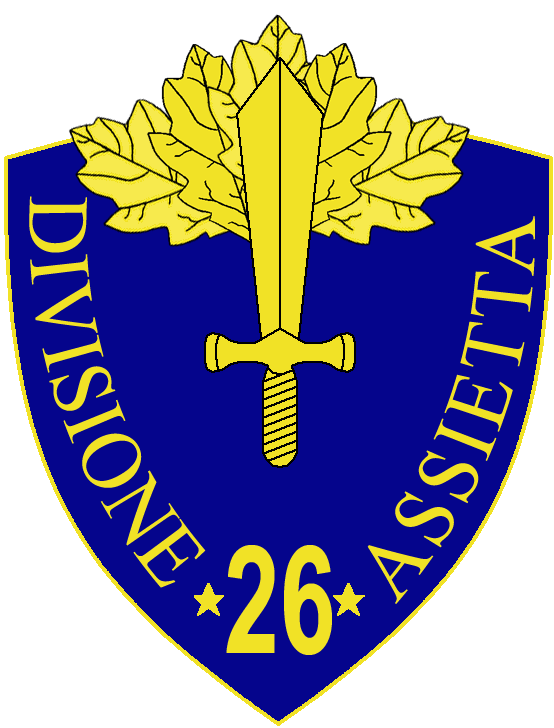
- 26th Infantry Division "Assietta" insignia
- Active: 6 August 1935 – September 1943
- Country: Kingdom of Italy
- Branch: Royal Italian Army
- Type: Infantry
- Size: Division
- Garrison/HQ: Asti
- Patron: Battle of Assietta
- Engagements: Second Italo-Abyssinian War: Battle of Amba Aradam; World War II: Italian invasion of France; Invasion of Yugoslavia; Battle of Sicily; Operation Achse

Insignia
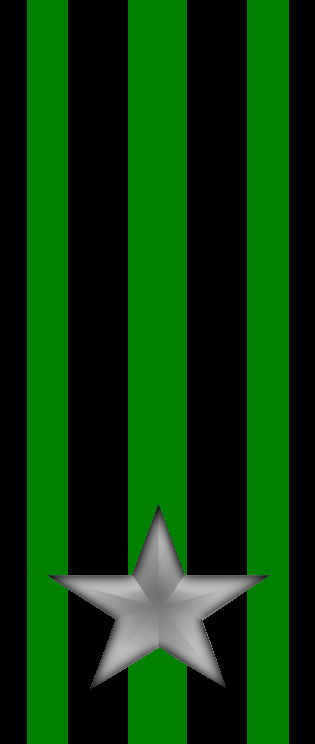
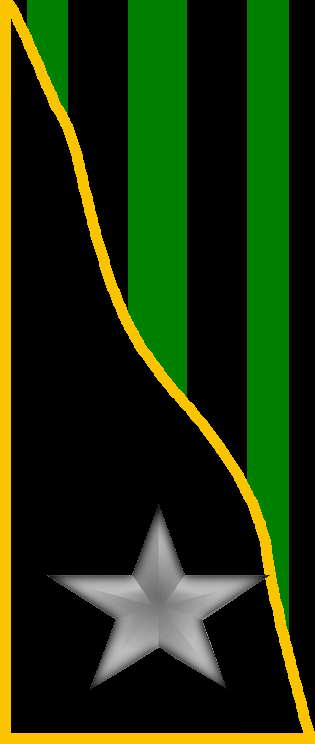
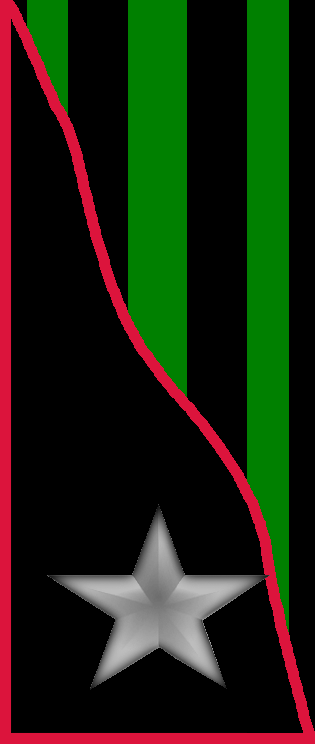
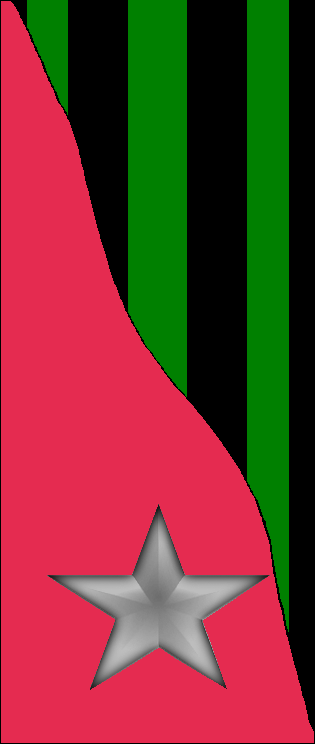
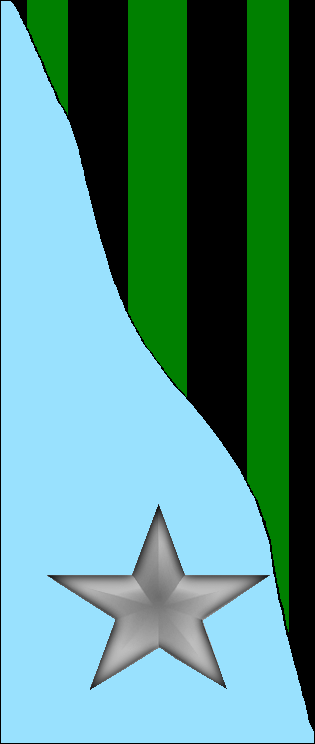
- Identification symbol: Assietta Division gorget patches

The 26th Infantry Division "Assietta" (Italian: 26ª Divisione di fanteria "Assietta") was a infantry division of the Royal Italian Army during World War II. The Assietta was a mountain-type infantry division, which meant that the division's artillery and logistics were moved by pack mules, while in standard infantry divisions artillery and logistics were moved by horse-drawn limbers and carriages. Italy's real mountain warfare divisions were the six alpine divisions manned by Alpini troops. The division was named for the Battle of Assietta in 1747 and based in Asti.

== History ==
The division's lineage begins with the Brigade "Pisa" established by order of the Provisional Government of the Grand Duchy of Tuscany of 4 November 1859 with the 1st and 2nd infantry regiments. On 25 March 1860 the Brigade "Pisa" entered the Royal Sardinian Army three days after the Kingdom of Sardinia had annexed the United Provinces of Central Italy, which included the Grand Duchy of Tuscany. Already before entering the Royal Sardinian Army the brigade's two infantry regiments had been renumbered on 30 December 1859 as 29th Infantry Regiment and 30th Infantry Regiment.

=== World War I ===
The brigade fought on the Italian front in World War I. In 1926 the brigade assumed the name of XXVI Infantry Brigade and received the 63rd Infantry Regiment "Cagliari" from the Brigade "Cagliari". The XXVI Infantry Brigade was the infantry component of the 26th Territorial Division of Salerno, which also included the 25th Artillery Regiment. On 30 March 1930 the division moved from Salerno in the South of Italy to Asti in the North and consequently changed its name to 26th Territorial Division of Asti. On 8 February 1934 the division changed its name to 26th Infantry Division "Assietta". On 1 April 1934 the division exchanged the 30th Infantry Regiment "Pisa" for the 38th Infantry Regiment "Ravenna" with the 3rd Territorial Division of Alessandria.

=== Second Italo-Abyssinian War ===
In preparation for the Second Italo-Abyssinian War the division was mobilized on 6 August 1935 with the 38th and 63rd infantry regiments and the 25th Artillery Regiment and shipped in September to Libya. In January 1936 the division moved to Eritrea, while the 25th Artillery Regiment entered the temporarily formed 126th Infantry Division "Assietta II", which had arrived in Libya in March 1936 with the 62nd Infantry Regiment "Sicilia" (detached from the 8th Infantry Division "Po") and the 81st Infantry Regiment "Torino" (detached from the 22nd Infantry Division "Cacciatori delle Alpi").

After landing in Massawa in Eritrea in January 1936 the Assietta received the temporarily reformed 49th Artillery Regiment from the 118th Infantry Division "Metauro II" and moved to the Endaga Robo-Enticho-Dek’emhāre region. Then the division moved its headquarters to Mek'ele, guarding a front from Doghea to Kwīhā. The Assietta participated in the Battle of Amba Aradam in February 1936, fighting mostly in defence. Some detachments of the Assietta were used to reinforce the left flank of the 27th Infantry Division "Sila". On 2 March 1936 the Assietta blocked the retreat route of the Ethiopian Army on the front from Yereserē to Edai. But the Ethiopians bypassed the Assietta, breaking through Italian lines further to the east on their way to Amba Alagi. The Assietta, now used as a rear area guard force, followed in March–April 1936 first to Aderat and Amba Alagi and then to Atzalo and Aiba. After the war's conclusion the division was used for mopping-up operations south of Lake Ashenge. The division's last garrison in Ethiopia was the city of Dessie from September 1936 until the orders to return to Italy were received on 2 February 1937.

=== World War II ===
Following its return to Italy in March 1937 the 25th Artillery Regiment returned to the division. On 25 March 1939 the 38th Infantry Regiment "Ravenna" was transferred to the 3rd Infantry Division "Ravenna" and the 30th Infantry Regiment "Pisa" returned to the Assietta. On 5 April 1939 the 63rd Infantry Regiment "Cagliari" was transferred to the newly activated 59th Infantry Division "Cagliari" and on the same date the XXVI Infantry Brigade was dissolved and the two remaining infantry regiments came under direct command of the division. Furthermore on the same date the 29th and 30th infantry regiments, and the 25th Artillery Regiment changed their names to "Assietta" and the division received the 17th CC.NN. Legion "Cremona".

==== Italian invasion of France ====
In preparation for the invasion of France the Assietta moved to the border with France and by 10 June 1940 the division was waiting for the begin of hostilities in the area of the mountains Rochers Charniers, Grand Queyron, Mont Chaberton, the pass of Col de Montgenèvre, and in the Thuras valley. The advance into French territory started on 18 June 1940, with a border post captured by surprise. By 20 June 1940, the division moved past mountain crests, completing capture of the Mount Chenaillet and mount Sommet des Anges fortified area by 22–23 June. Further advances were stopped by the signing of the Franco-Italian Armistice on 25 June 1940.

==== Invasion of Yugoslavia ====
At the start of April 1941 the Assietta moved to the border with Yugoslavia for the upcoming invasion of Yugoslavia. On 6 April 1941 the division was in the border town of Ajdovščina from where it moved to defensive positions at Javornik. After the collapse of the Yugoslav Army the division moved its headquarters to Delnice on 20 April 1941, performing mopping-up operations in the Gerovo-Karlovac-Lokve, Croatia region. As operations began to wrap up, the division moved to Ilirska Bistrica on 6 May 1941 before returning to its basses on 15 May 1941.

==== Defence of Sicily ====
In the first half of August 1941 the division was sent to Sicily and assigned to the XII Army Corps in the Western half of the island. Initially the division's headquarters were in Caltanissetta and it was tasked to defend the coast between Porto Empedocle and Licata.

On 10 July 1943, the day of the Allied invasion of Sicily, the division was in the Santa Ninfa-Partanna area in the west of Sicily. The division concentrated its forces in Roccapalumba, Lercara Friddi and Prizzi and by 15 July had built up blocking positions at the latter two locations and at Bisacquino in an attempt to block the Allies' advance from Agrigento to Palermo. The rapid crumbling of Italian defences elsewhere meant that this defensive line had to be abandoned on 16 July 1943 and the division fell back to a new line between Cerda and Sclafani Bagni. Unlike other Italian units nearby, the Assietta maintained constant contact with the enemy, repeatedly engaging in delaying skirmishes. An attempt was made to make a stand on 22 July 1943, but by late evening of 23 July 1943 the Allies had broken through, resulting in an Italian retreat to Santo Stefano di Camastra and Mistretta.

On 29 July 1943 the division tried to stop the Americans at the San Fratello-Troina line. The nearby Battle of Troina concluded on 6 August 1943 and afterwards American units concentrated their attacks on the battered Assietta. The initial American armor attack towards San Fratello and mount Pizzo degli Angeli was repulsed, but on 7 August 1943, the Assietta had to fall back to Tortorici after the Allies had landed troops in the division's rear at Militello Rosmarino. By this time the division was severely crippled by heavy casualties and unfit for battle. What remained of the division retreated to Messina, from where it was evacuated to mainland Italy on 14-18 August 1943.

=== Dissolution ===
What remained of the division returned to its regimental depots in Piedmont to be rebuilt. After the announcement of the Armistice of Cassibile on 8 September 1943 the division surrendered to the invading Germans forces.

== Organization ==
The 26th Infantry Division "Assietta" was based in eastern Piedmont and had its headquarters in Asti. Its two infantry regiments were based in Asti (29th) and Tortona (30th), with the division's artillery regiment also based in Asti. The 17th CC.NN. Legion was recruited in Lombardy: the XVII CC.NN. Battalion in Cremona and the XVIII CC.NN. Battalion in Crema.

=== 1935 ===
- 26th Infantry Division "Assietta"
  - 38th Infantry Regiment "Ravenna"
  - 63rd Infantry Regiment "Cagliari"
  - 49th Artillery Regiment
  - DIV Medium Machine Gun Battalion
  - Engineers Company
  - Replacements Battalion

Each army division in the Ethiopian Campaign had a pack-mules unit of 3,000 mules and three regimental truck units with 20 light trucks each.

=== World War II ===
26th Infantry Division "Assietta" organization in 1940

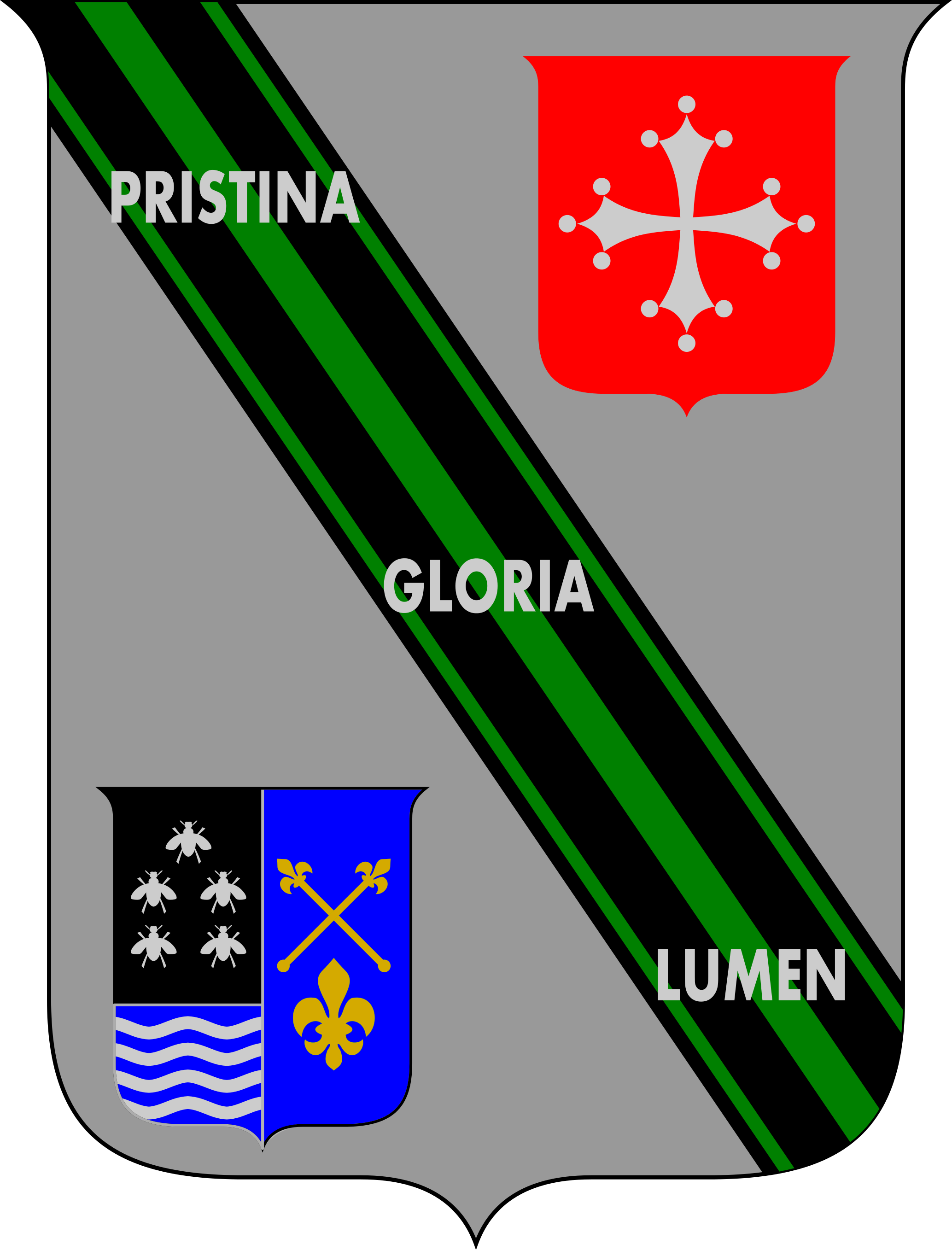
Coat of Arms of the 29th Infantry Regiment "Assietta", 1939

- 26th Infantry Division "Assietta", in Asti
  - Headquarters
    - Command Company
    - 77th Carabinieri Section
    - 78th Carabinieri Section
    - 84th Field Post Office
    - 26th Infantry Division Command Transport Squad
  - 29th Infantry Regiment "Assietta", (Note: Named 29th Infantry Regiment "Pisa" until 1939 when the army reorganized its divisions as binary divisions and divisional infantry regiments took the name of the division.) in Asti
    - Command Company
    - 3 × Fusilier battalions
    - Support Weapons Battery (65/17 mod. 13 infantry support guns)
    - Mortar Company (81mm mod. 35 mortars)
  - 30th Infantry Regiment "Assietta", (Note: Named 30th Infantry Regiment "Pisa" until 1939 when the army reorganized its divisions as binary divisions and divisional infantry regiments took the name of the division.) in Tortona
    - Command Company
    - 3 × Fusilier battalions
    - Support Weapons Battery (65/17 mod. 13 infantry support guns)
    - Mortar Company (81mm mod. 35 mortars)
  - 25th Artillery Regiment "Assietta", in Asti
    - Command Unit
    - I Group (100/17 mod. 14 howitzers; transferred on 2 February 1941 to the 36th Artillery Regiment "Forlì")
    - I Group (75/27 mod. 11 field guns; transferred on 2 February 1941 from the 36th Artillery Regiment "Forlì")
    - II Group (75/27 mod. 11 field guns)
    - III Group (75/13 mod. 15 mountain guns)
    - IV Group (100/17 mod. 14 howitzers; formed by the depot of the 48th Artillery Regiment "Taro" and transferred to the regiment in May 1942)
    - 10th Anti-aircraft Battery (20/65 mod. 35 anti-aircraft guns)
    - Ammunition and Supply Unit
  - 25th Artillery Regiment "Assietta", in Asti (after being reorganized in October 1942)
    - Command Unit
    - I Group (100/17 mod. 14 howitzers)
    - II Group (100/17 mod. 14 howitzers; transferred from the 22nd Artillery Regiment "Aosta" in exchange for the III Group with 75/13 mod. 15 mountain guns)
    - III Group (75/27 mod. 11 field guns)
    - IV Group (75/27 mod. 11 field guns)
    - V Group (75/18 mod. 35 howitzers; planned addition but did not arrive in Sicily in time)
    - 10th Anti-aircraft Battery (20/65 mod. 35 anti-aircraft guns)
    - 326th Anti-aircraft Battery (20/65 mod. 35 anti-aircraft guns)
    - Ammunition and Supply Unit
  - XXVI Mortar Battalion (81mm mod. 35 mortars; detached to the 52nd Infantry Division "Torino")
  - CXXVI Machine Gun Battalion (joined the division after its transfer to Sicily)
  - 26th Anti-tank Company (47/32 mod. 35 anti-tank guns; replaced by the 126th Anti-tank Company in Sicily)
  - 26th Telegraph and Radio Operators Company
  - 64th Engineer Company
  - 16th Medical Section
    - 9th Field Hospital
    - 10th Field Hospital
    - 151st Field Hospital
    - 468th Field Hospital
    - 1 × Surgical Unit
  - 18th Supply Section
  - 26th Autocarrette Section
  - 262nd Transport Section

Attached for the invasion of France:

- XIX CC.NN. Battalion

Attached from late 1940 until the division's evacuation from Sicily:

- 17th CC.NN. Legion "Cremona", in Cremona
  - XVII CC.NN. Battalion
  - XVIII CC.NN. Battalion
  - 17th CC.NN. Machine Gun Company (replaced in Sicily by the 259th CC.NN. Machine Gun Company)

== Commanding officers ==
The division's commanding officers were:

- Generale di Divisione Enrico Riccardi (17 September 1933 - 30 June 1937)
- Generale di Divisione Enrico Boscardi (1 July 1937 - 1938)
- Generale di Divisione Camillo Mercalli (1938 - 19 December 1939)
- Generale di Divisione Stefano Degiani (20 December 1939 - 14 January 1940)
- Colonel Guido Piacenza (acting, 15 January 1940 - 31 January 1940)
- Generale di Divisione Emanuele Girlando (1 February 1940 - 30 July 1941)
- Generale di Divisione Giulio Perugi (1 August 1941 - 30 April 1942)
- Generale di Divisione Pietro Zaglio (1 May 1942 - 31 January 1943)
- Generale di Brigata Mario Vece (1 February 1943 - 7 June 1943)
- Generale di Divisione Francesco Scotti (8 June 1943 - 25 July 1943)
- Generale di Brigata Ottorino Schreiber (26 July 1943 - 8 September 1943)
