= Fundamental Statute for the Secular Government of the States of the Church =

The Fundamental Statute for the Secular Government of the States of the Church was the constitution of the Papal States conceded by Pope Pius IX as a result of the 1848 revolutions. It was published on 14 March 1848, on the same day as the pope issued an appeal to the people of Rome and the Papal States to raise issues of concern through lawful procedures and avoid civil revolt.

== Contents ==
The statute provided for two legislative chambers, which were to meet at the same time. The first was to consist of members nominated for life by the Pope and the second, of one hundred elected deputies. The laws adopted by these two chambers had first to undergo the scrutiny of the College of Cardinals, before being submitted to the Pope for his assent or rejection. Ecclesiastical, or ecclesiastico-political, affairs were exempted from parliamentary interference. Also the parliament was required to abstain from the enactment of laws conflicting with criticism of the diplomatic and religious relations of the Holy See with foreign powers.

== See also ==
- Cardinal Secretary of State
- Reactionary
