= Škabrijel =

Mountain in Slovenia

Coordinates: 45.9762°N 13.6777°E

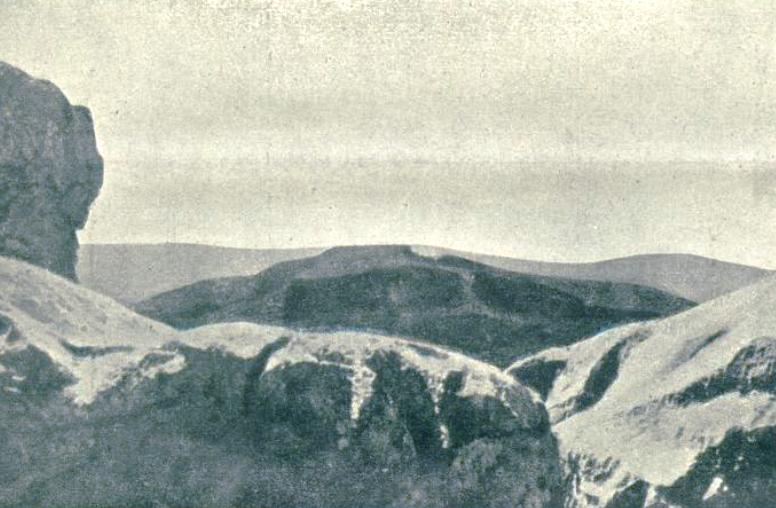
1917 photo of Škabrijel Hill

Škabrijel (Italian: Monte San Gabriele) is a 646-metre (2,119 ft) hill above the town of Nova Gorica in Slovenia. The hill is named after the Archangel Gabriel.

== History ==
During the First World War it was a stronghold of the Austro-Hungarian Army. The hill was fought over in the Eleventh Battle of the Isonzo. During the battle, the top of Škabrijel Hill was lost and recaptured nine times by the Austro-Hungarians. One officer described the fighting, stating: "Around 6 o'clock in the morning, the Italians attacked for the first time, and then it went all day. But we always repulsed them with hand grenades, machine guns tried to take the trenches. I was on the left wing with six other men, strong and fearless. They went forward when they attacked, even the second time they persisted even though they were wounded and one dead. We held out and repulsed them with hand grenades." Due to artillery bombardment by the Italian Army during the First World War, the hill—now densely wooded—was left almost entirely bare.

== Geography ==
The hill stands northeast of Nova Gorica. The Julian Alps and the Carnic Alps rise to the north. The Karst Black Hills, Trstelj Hill, and the Adriatic Sea are to the south. To the east is the Trnovo Forest Plateau.
