= Administrative subdivisions of the Papal States from 1816 to 1870 =

The delegations as they existed in 1859.

Between the Congress of Vienna (1815) and the capture of Rome (1870), the Papal State was subdivided geographically into 17 apostolic delegations (delegazioni apostoliche) for administrative purposes. These were instituted by Pope Pius VII in a motu proprio of 6 July 1816: Quando per ammirabile disposizione. (Note: Shortened from Quando per ammirabile disposizione della Provvidenza Divina, "When by the friendly disposition of divine providence".)

A delegation was known as a legation (legazione) when governed by a cardinal. The four northernmost delegations—Bologna, Ferrara, Forlì and Ravenna, which comprised the region known as the Romagne (plural of Romagna)—were regularly governed by cardinals. Thus, the term "Legations" or Papal Legations (Legazioni pontificie), when used on its own, often refers to the Romagne. In an administrative reform of 1850, Pius IX grouped the delegations into five larger legations. The four original legations were joined into the legation of the Romagne. In 1859, the Kingdom of Sardinia invaded the Papal State and set up a military government, the United Provinces of Central Italy, that included the Romagne. Following a plebiscite, the Romagne were formally annexed to Sardinia in 1860.

== Motu proprio of 1816 ==
Between 1798 and 1800, and again between 1809 and 1814, the Papal State was occupied by French troops and the pope was in exile. After the restoration of the Papal State by the Congress of Vienna, Pius VII set about reforming its administration, assisted by Cardinal Secretary of State Ercole Consalvi. The result was the motu proprio of 6 July 1816 "on the organization of public administration".

The existing 12 provinces were abandoned in favour of 17 delegations, although Rome and its hinterland formed a separate comarca. The new administration was modelled on that introduced by the French.

The new delegations were grouped into three classes. At the head of each delegation was a delegate (delegato) who was appointed by the pope through an act of the secretary of state and who was invariably a prelate. Only in cases where the prelate was a cardinal did he assume the title of legate (legato), and cardinals could only be appointed to the delegations of the first class. Each delegate or legate was assisted by two assessors appointed by the pope, one for civil law matters and one for penal law matters, and by a locally selected Governmental Congregation (Congregazione governativa), the composition of which varied according to the class of the delegation:

- In those of the first class, there were four members: two selected from the capital city and two from the hinterland.
- In those of the second class, there were three members: two from the capital and one from the hinterland.
- In those of the third class, there were two members: one from the capital and one from the hinterland.

In each delegation, the administration of justice was devolved on a court of first instance (tribunale di prima istanza) for civil matters and a criminal court (tribunale criminale) for crimes. Some of the delegations were subdivided into districts, each headed by a governor. The arrangement created by the motu proprio of 1816 looked like this:

Delegation	Class	Capital	Districts
Legation of Bologna	1st	Bologna	
Legation of Ferrara	1st	Ferrara	
Legation of Forlì	1st	Forlì	Cesena, Forlì, Rimini
Legation of Ravenna	1st	Ravenna	Faenza, Imola, Ravenna
Delegation of Urbino e Pesaro	1st	Urbino	Fano, Gubbio, Pesaro, Senigallia, Urbino
Delegation of Ancona	2nd	Ancona	Ancona, Jesi, Osimo
Delegation of Fermo	2nd	Fermo	
Delegation of Frosinone	2nd	Frosinone	Anagni, Frosinone, Pontecorvo, Terracina
Delegation of Macerata	2nd	Macerata	Fabriano, Loreto, Macerata, San Severino
Delegation of Perugia	2nd	Perugia	Città di Castello, Foligno, Perugia, Todi
Delegation of Spoleto	2nd	Spoleto	Norcia, Spoleto, Terni
Delegation of Viterbo	2nd	Viterbo	Orvieto, Viterbo
Delegation of Ascoli	3rd	Ascoli	Ascoli, Montalto
Delegation of Benevento	3rd	Benevento	
Delegation of Camerino	3rd	Camerino	
Delegation of Civitavecchia	3rd	Civitavecchia	
Delegation of Rieti	3rd	Rieti	Poggio Mirteto, Rieti
Comarca of Roma	–	Rome	Rome, Subiaco, Tivoli

== Reforms ==
=== Provinces of 1820 ===
In 1820, the delegations and the comarca of Rome were grouped into 11 provinces (province). The delegations of Camerino, Benevento, Bologna and Ferrara were their own provinces under those names. Rieti was its own province, called Sabina, and Urbino e Pesaro was synonymous with the province called Urbino. Rome was joined with Frosinone to form the province of Marittima e Campagna. Viterbo and Civitavecchia were joined to form the province of Patrimonio; Perugia and Spoleto the province of Umbria; Ancona, Ascoli, Fermo and Macerata the province of the Marche; and Forlì and Ravenna the province of Romagna.

=== Leo XII (1825) and Gregory XVI (1831–32) ===
Leo XII, successor of Pius VII, issued a motu proprio on 5 October 1825, which reduced the number of delegations from 17 to 13 by combining Fermo and Ascoli, Macerata and Camerino, Spoleto and Rieti and Viterbo and Civitavecchia.

In an edict issued on 5 July 1831, Leo XII's successor, Gregory XVI, reversed his reform and also created a new delegation based on Orvieto out of the territory of the delegation of Viterbo. He raised the number of delegations to 19 the following year with his motu proprio Luminose prove of 1 February 1832. The new delegation, based on Velletri and carved out of that of Frosinone, was granted to the Dean of the College of Cardinals and thus constituted a new legation. Although boundaries would change, subsequent reforms would retain a legate at Velletri.

=== New legations of Pius IX ===
In March 1848, Pius IX, facing revolution in Rome, promulgated a new constitution for the Papal State. It was not enough to quell the revolution and he fled to take refuge in the Kingdom of Naples. In 1849, a Roman Republic was declared. It was crushed by a French army, and Pius returned to Rome on 12 April 1850.

On 22 November 1850, Pius IX issued an edict grouping the 19 delegations into four new legations and a district (circondario, circle or circumscription) around Rome. Each of the new higher-level legations was entrusted to a cardinal.

Legations and delegations of 1850
Legation	Map	Capital	Delegations	Districts
I Legation (Romagna)		Bologna	Bologna	Bologna
I Legation (Romagna)		Bologna	Ferrara	Ferrara, Lugo
I Legation (Romagna)		Bologna	Forlì	Cesena, Forlì, Rimini
I Legation (Romagna)		Bologna	Ravenna	Faenza, Imola, Ravenna
II Legation (Marche)		Ancona	Urbino e Pesaro	Fano, Gubbio, Pesaro, Senigallia, Urbino
II Legation (Marche)		Ancona	Macerata	Fabriano, Loreto, Macerata, Recanati, San Severino
II Legation (Marche)		Ancona	Ancona	Ancona, Jesi, Osimo
II Legation (Marche)		Ancona	Fermo	Fermo
II Legation (Marche)		Ancona	Ascoli	Ascoli, Montalto
II Legation (Marche)		Ancona	Camerino	Camerino
III Legation (Umbria)		Perugia	Perugia	Città di Castello, Foligno, Perugia, Todi
III Legation (Umbria)		Perugia	Spoleto	Norcia, Spoleto, Terni
III Legation (Umbria)		Perugia	Rieti	Poggio Mirteto, Rieti
IV Legation (Marittima e Campagna)		Velletri	Velletri	Velletri
IV Legation (Marittima e Campagna)		Velletri	Frosinone	Frosinone, Pontecorvo
IV Legation (Marittima e Campagna)		Velletri	Benevento	Benevento
District of Rome (Lazio)		Rome	Roma	Roma, Subiaco, Tivoli
District of Rome (Lazio)		Rome	Viterbo	Viterbo
District of Rome (Lazio)		Rome	Civitavecchia	Civitavecchia
District of Rome (Lazio)		Rome	Orvieto	Orvieto

== Local government ==
=== 1816–47 ===
Pius VII completely reformed the municipal administration. All municipal laws from before or during the Revolution were repealed and municipal government was made uniform across the Papal State.

Local governments were divided into those of the first class ("di primo ordine"), which were the larger cities, and those of the second ("di secondo"), which were all other comuni (municipalities). Each municipality was governed by a mayor called a governor (governatore) appointed by the pope through the secretary of state. Governors of the first class were appointed by papal brief, while those of the second class merely by letters patent. Governors were not necessarily ecclesiastics, and they had to be neither native to nor resident in their municipalities. They were under the authority of the apostolic delegates. The governors held judicial authority in cases involving less than 100 scudi, in property disputes and in some other cases. They were charged with policing fairs and festivals.

Pius VII introduced into each comune a council (consiglio) with deliberative functions and a magistracy (magistratura) with executive functions. The functions of the magistracy had previously belonged to the higher authorities. The original members of the councils were selected by the delegates, but subsequently new councilors were co-opted. The magistracy was composed of elders (anziani) drawn from the council under the leadership of a gonfaloniere (literally, standard-bearer), who was not required to be a councilor. The gonfalonieri were chosen by the secretary of state, while the elders were chosen by the delegate from a list of names submitted by the council.

The small rural villages of the comuni each had their own syndic (sindaco) or procurator (procuratore) subject to the communal gonfaloniere.

=== 1847–70 ===
On 1 October 1847, Pius IX issued the motu proprio Sull'organizzazione del Consiglio e Senato di Roma e le sue attribuzioni, (Note: "On the organization of the council and senate of Rome and its attributes".) which extended to Rome the laws applicable in the other municipalities. Rome thus received a council of 100 men: 96 laymen chosen through the census to represent various professions and 4 clergy chosen by the Cardinal Vicar. The Senator (Note: In January 1143, Pope Innocent II re-established the Roman Senate. Senators were elected to serve for one year and were eligible for reelection. Originally, there were between 50 and 56 senators, but by the time of Celestine III (1191–98) the number had dwindled to just two. In 1198, Innocent III named just one, the summus senator.) was made gonfaloniere (mayor) and presided over an executive body (the magistracy) composed of eight conservators (conservatori).

The Roman revolution of 1848 interrupted the reforming process that had begun with Rome the previous year, but in an edict of 24 November 1850, in implementation of Pius IX's motu prioprio of 12 September 1849, Cardinal Giacomo Antonelli defined the new competences of the council and magistracy. The councils would now:

- nominate their own employees and those on their payroll
- run the school system
- maintain the roads and other communal infrastructure (bridges, aqueducts, fountains, etc.)
- operate the public utilities
- approve the annual tabella (budget)

The magistracy would now:

- execute the decisions of the council
- sign contracts on behalf of the council
- prepare the annual budget and accounting statements

The municipalities were divided into five classes based on population, which determined how many councilors they would get:

- > 20,000 inhabitants → first class → 36 councilors
- > 10,000 inhabitants → second class → 30 councilors
- > 5,000 inhabitants → third class → 24 councilors
- > 1,000 inhabitants → fourth class → 16 councilors
- < 1,000 inhabitants → fifth class → 10 councilors

The councilors were to be selected by the delegate and approved by the Cardinal Prefect of the Sacra Consulta. Rome's council was reduced from 100 to 48.
