= Bisacquino =

Bisacquino Busacchinu (Sicilian)
- Comune
- Comune di Bisacquino
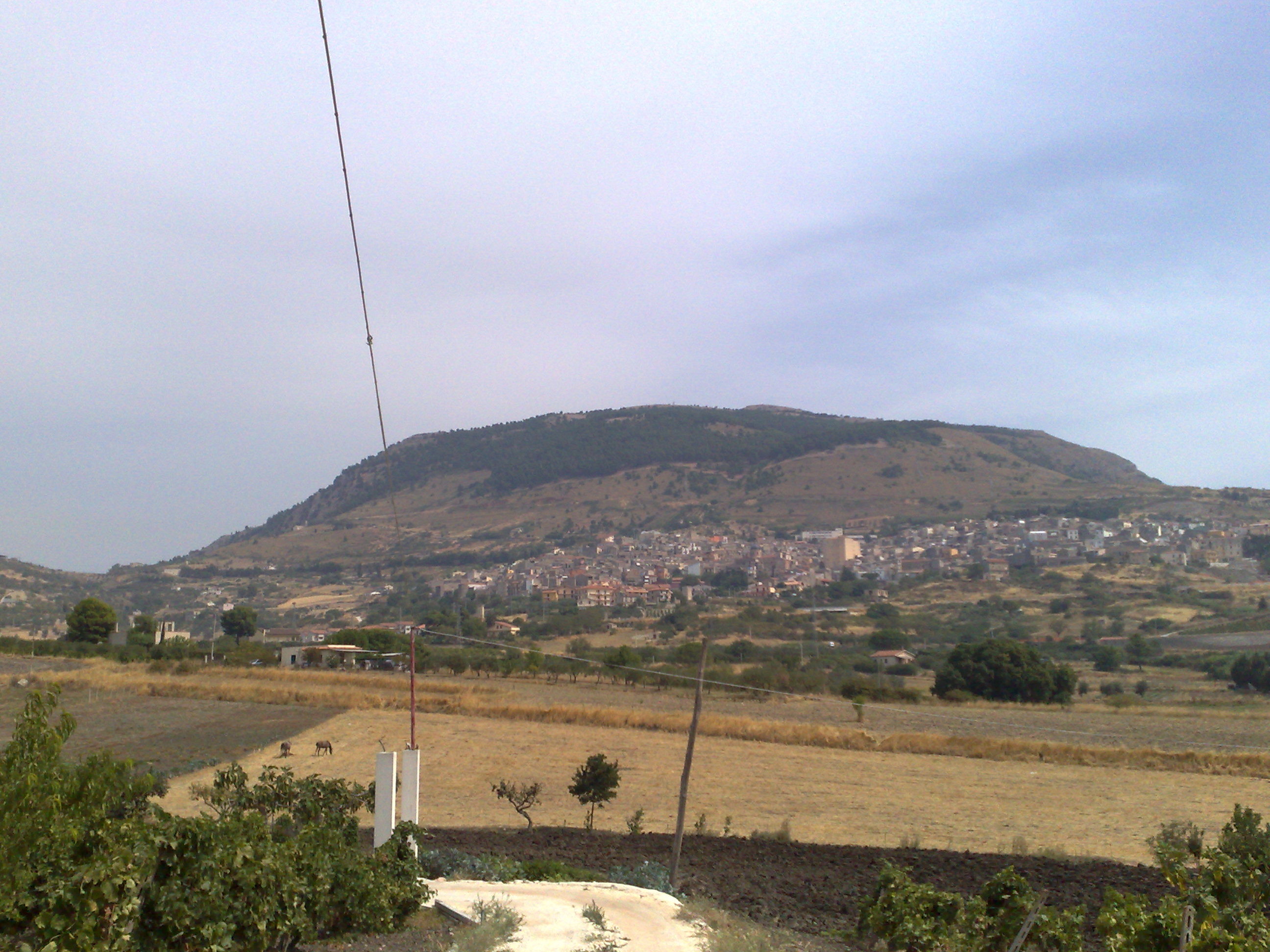

- Location within Italy Location within Sicily
- Coordinates: 37°42′N 13°15′E
- Country: Italy
- Region: Sicily
- Metropolitan city: Palermo (PA)

Government
  - Mayor: Tommaso Francesco Di Giorgio

Area
  - Total: 64 km^{2} (25 sq mi)
- Elevation: 715 m (2,346 ft)

Population (30 April 2017)
  - Total: 4,527
  - Density: 71/km^{2} (180/sq mi)
- Demonym: Bisacquinesi
- Time zone: UTC+1 (CET)
  - Summer (DST): UTC+2 (CEST)
- Postal code: 90032
- Dialing code: 091
- Patron saint: Saint Rosalia
- Saint day: September 4
- Website: Official website

Bisacquino (Sicilian: Busacchinu) is a town and comune in the Metropolitan City of Palermo in Sicily, Italy. It is located 82 kilometres (51 mi) from Agrigento and has approximately 4,500 inhabitants. The small town rises on an inner hill zone and is 700 metres (2,300 ft) above sea-level. The economy is based on agriculture and products are sold in abundance in the main town including cereals, olives, vegetables, almonds, hazel nuts and wine-grapes. Sheep breeding is also active in Bisacquino.

== People ==
- Legendary film director Frank Capra (1897–1991) was born in Bisacquino but emigrated as a child with his family to the United States.

== Pop culture ==
In the Everybody Loves Raymond episode "Mia Famiglia", "Zia (aunt) Sarina" hails from Bisacquino.
