= United Provinces of Central Italy =

Former Italian state (1859-1860)

United Provinces of Central Italy Province Unite del Centro Italia (Italian)
- 1859–1860
- Flag Coat of Arms
- Anthem: Marcia Reale d'Ordinanza ("Royal March of Ordinance"; unofficial)
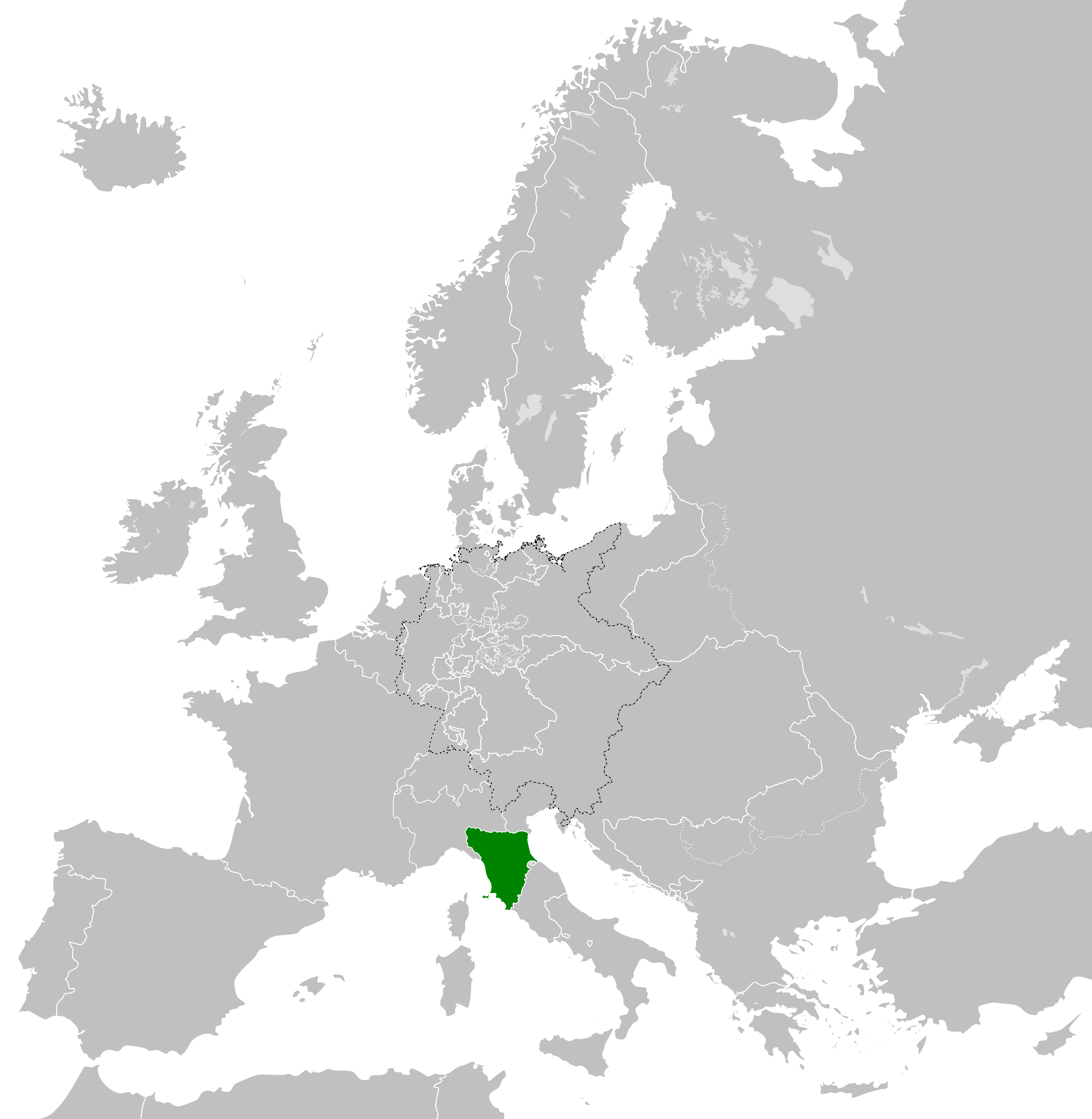
- The United Provinces of Central Italy (green)
- Status: Client state of Sardinia
- Capital: Modena
- Common languages: Italian; Tuscan; Emilian-Romagnol
- Government: Military government
  - King: Victor Emmanuel II
  - Governor General: Carlo Bon Compagni di Mombello
- Historical era: Late modern
  - Revolution: 8 December 1859
  - Annexation: 22 March 1860
- Currency: Sardinian lira, Tuscan florin
Preceded by
Grand Duchy of Tuscany
Duchy of Parma and Piacenza
Duchy of Modena and Reggio
Papal Legations
Succeeded by
Kingdom of Sardinia
- Today part of: Italy

The United Provinces of Central Italy (Italian: Province Unite del Centro Italia), also known as the Confederation of Central Italy or General Government of Central Italy, was a short-lived military government established in 1859 by the Kingdom of Piedmont-Sardinia. It was formed by a union of the former Grand Duchy of Tuscany, the Duchy of Parma, the Duchy of Modena, and the Papal Legations (Romagna), after the Second Italian War of Independence. It corresponds to the modern Italian regions of Tuscany and Emilia-Romagna.

Following a plebiscite in March 1860 where the people of the provinces voted in favour of joining the Kingdom of Sardinia, the United Provinces of Central Italy were formally annexed by Sardinia. This paved the way for the declaration of the Kingdom of Italy on March 17, 1861.

== Establishment ==
Prior to the establishment of the Kingdom of Italy, the Italian Peninsula existed as an assortment of various states or provinces, with no central government.

Support for the risorgimento – "resurgence", or movement towards national unification – gained traction among the Italian states from 1859 onwards and was broadly accelerated by the three Italian Wars of Independence.

The First Italian War of Independence was fought from 1848 to 1849 against Austria in an initial attempt to assert Italian independence. However, this war was widely considered a failure.

In 1859, the Second Italian War of Independence broke out in a second attempt to fight against and achieve independence from Austria, which controlled large expanses of northern Italy. The Second War of Independence resulted in the Kingdom of Sardinia annexing Lombardy – a move that was key in the unification of the various states into one Kingdom of Italy.

As this consolidation occurred, in Central Italy, work had already begun to organise some the provinces of the region – including Tuscany, Modena, Parma and the Papal Legations – into a union, primed for an eventual annexation by Sardinia.

In 1859, an assembly from the central provinces of Tuscany, Modena, Parma and the Papal Legations was elected to meet and discuss the prospective union.

The delegates met in Florence's old town hall, within the ancient hall of the Five Hundred, where it was decided the union was to proceed.

In December 1859, the Grand Duchy of Tuscany formed a union with the duchies of Modena, Parma and the Papal Legations – officially creating the confederation that is known as the United Provinces of Central Italy.

== Scholarship surrounding the Italian unification ==
Scholars refer to the unification of the Italian states as the risorgimento - an Italian word meaning “revival’ and implying the movement or period towards the Kingdom of Italy. Independence, unification and liberty were the three overarching ideals surrounding the risorgimento, as many believed it would herald a new era for the regions following a long period of provincialism. While there was no one scholar who coined the term risorgimento, the ideas of the movement were propagated and distributed by various Italian public figures through a series of independently established newspapers. This included Cesare Balbo and Camillo di Cavour’s title, Il Risorgimento; Giuseppe Mazzini’s newspaper, L’Italia del Popolo; and Giovan Battista Bottero’s publication, La Gazetta del Popolo. A society in support of the nationalisation of Italy, known as the Societa Nazionale Italian (SNI), was also active during this time, of which citizens of Tuscany, Piedmont and Lombardy comprised 50 per cent of the membership. Amongst the citizenry, general support for the risorgimento was driven by the wealthy, educated middle classes of the various Italian states, who aspired to free and functional trade. Unifying the Italian states would standardise currency, weight and measurement systems, build stronger transport systems and abolish high tariffs on the import and export of goods between each Italian state; making it profitable for these groups.

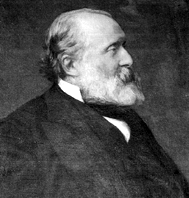
Cesare Correnti.

The scholarship of Italian academic Cesare Correnti, as reported by Pitero Maestri, also played a key role in the thinking surrounding the Italian unification Correnti argued that Italy was "united in diversity", with sixteen diverse regions in three areas – continental, peninsular and insular – each complementing and completing each other, including:

- The Pedemontana (the Piedmontese state)
- The Cispadana (the legations of the legations of Ferrara and Bologna)
- The Transpadana (Lombardy)
- The Adriatic (Veneto)
- The Apennine Riviera (the Genovesato)
- The Adriatic Coast (the Marche)
- The Arno Valley (Tuscany)
- The Tiber valley (the Roman countryside)
- The Central Apennines (Umbria, Abruzzo, and the Sannio)
- The Terra di Lavoro (the ‘Land of Work’, also known as Naples, and the rest of Campania)
- The Plain of the Two Seas (Puglia)
- The Bipeninsular extremity (Calabria)
- Sicily
- Sardinia
- Corsica
- Istria

== Government ==
Originally, the assembly of the United Provinces of Central Italy elected Prince Eugenio Emanuele di Savoia-Carignano (the Prince of Carignan) to serve as the confederate’s regent in November 1859.

However, when this decision was presented to the King of Sardinia, Victor Emmanuel II, the King rejected the call to appoint Prince di Savoia-Carignano as regent. The Prince subsequently declined the offer of the assembly to become regent, and decreed Carlo Buoncompagni, the Count of Mombello, must be appointed to the role of regent.

Therefore, during the brief existence of the United Provinces of Central Italy, Carlo Buoncompagni assumed the regency, under the title of Governor-General of the United Province.

Buoncompagni was responsible for the military and diplomatic affairs of the states, as well as any orders to be given to the general of the confederation, Luigi Carlo Farini, and Bettino Ricasoli, the chief figurehead of Tuscany.

Luigi Carlo Farini was known as a key figurehead or “dictator” of Modena, Parma and Bologna.

== Carlo Buoncompagni ==
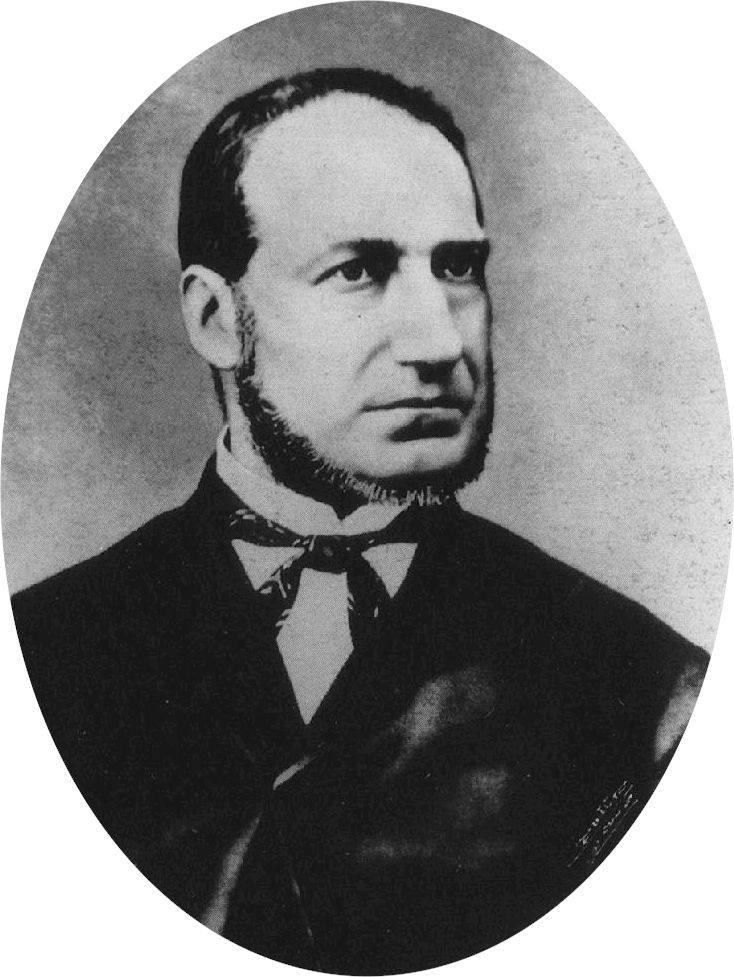
Carlo Buoncompagni, the Count of Mombello.

Carlo Buoncompagni, also known as the Count of Mombello, was born in Turin, Italy, on 25 July 1804.

As well as being a member of the nobility, parliamentarian and political leader, Buoncompagni had a degree in law from the University of Turin and practiced in the legal profession as a magistrate in Italy.

Buoncompagni’s career in politics began in 1848, when he was appointed the Minister for Public Education – a role which he served within for first the Balbo Government, and then successively the Perrone Government of the Kingdom of Sardinia before he resigned from government for a period of time.

For a period following his resignation from government, records show Buoncompagni was active within the city council of Turin, serving as Decurion of Turin 1848, and City Councillor of Turin from 1848 to 1851.

Then, in 1852, Buoncompagni returned to serve in the Kingdom of Sardinia’s government once again, this time as the Minister of Public Education and Minister of Ecclesiastical Affairs and Justice. Following the Cavour Government’s ascension to power in 1852, Buoncompagni continued to serve in government as the Minister of Ecclesiastical Affairs and Justice until November 1853.

During the 1850s, Buoncompagni served in a variety of diplomatic roles, including as an envoy and diplomat for Tuscany, Parma and Modena, and as the Sardinian Extraordinary Commissioner in Tuscany.

The Prince of Carignan believed these roles placed the count in good stead to serve as leader of the United Provinces of Central Italy; and therefore, when the Prince of Carignan was appointed by the King of Sardinia to serve as the Governor-General of the United Provinces, the Prince chose to defer the position to Buoncompagni. In writing to appoint Carlo Buoncompagni to the role of regent of the United Provinces of Central Italy on November 14, 1859, the Prince of Carignan wrote:

“Your high reputation, the noble qualities of your heart and head, the proofs of devotion you have given to your Kind and country, the entire confidence which I repose in you, and which I am well please thus publicly to testify, are so many grounds for your mission having a successful issue.”

Historical sources suggest Buoncompagni was in fact a popular leader of the united provinces, and was instrumental in their successful unification with the Kingdom of Sardinia.

In later years, following the incorporation of the United Provinces of Central Italy into the Italian state, Buoncompagni entered academia, teaching at the University of Turin as a Professor of Constitutional Law and becoming a national member of Rome’s prestigious European scientific institution, the Academy dei Lincei.

Buoncompagni died in his birthplace of Turin, Italy, on 15 December 1880.

== Military ==
A joint army consisting of forces from Tuscany, Modena, Parma and the Papal Legations was responsible for the defence of the United Provinces of Central Italy during its existence. This included four cavalry regiments, four infantry regiments and 12 battalions.

As regent, Buoncompagni was the most senior official overseeing this joint military during its operation.

== Currency ==
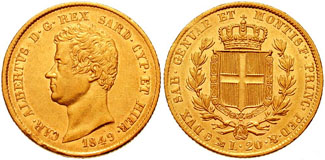
A 20 lire coin, circa 1849.

During the existence of the United Provinces of Central Italy, the Kingdom of Sardinia used the Sardinian lira. Being a client state of the Kingdom of Sardinia, it is likely the United Provinces of Central Italy therefore also used the Sardinian lira widely. There were around ninety difference currencies used by the various states that later formed Italy, with Tuscany having 24 different currencies alone.

Following the unification of the Kingdom of Italy in 1861, in August 1862, the Sardinian lira became the national currency of Italy.

== Annexation by Sardinia ==
By 1860, not only the “organs of government” but also private circles - including a Society for Incorporation at Any Cost - were calling for the United Provinces of Central Italy to become part of Sardinia.

Along with Italy’s northern regions, the central provinces soon became the key drivers of the final phase of the risorgimento - or national unification movement - among the Italian states.

It was soon decided that a vote was in order to determine whether the provinces would join the Kingdom of Sardinia.

Parliamentarian and Count of Cavour, Camillo Benso, approached the Emperor in early 1860 to arrange for this vote within the provinces. Farini, considered the “dictator” of the central Italian provinces, also moved to arrange for this vote, which was eventually granted by French Emperor Napoleon III following some dissent.

A plebiscite was held within the United Provinces of Central Italy, and on 11 March 1860, it was apparent that by an overwhelming majority, the people of the provinces had voted in favour of joining the Kingdom of Sardinia. According to electoral records, 426,0006 citizens had voted in favour of the annexation by the Kingdom of Sardinia, with only 756 votes recorded against the merger, and in favour of an independent kingdom.

Official steps were soon taken to amalgamate the provinces with the Kingdom of Sardinia, On 12 April 1860, the decree of annexation was formally presented to a Parliament consisting of the figureheads of Sardinia, Lombardy, Emilia and Tuscany.

The Parliament voted almost unanimously in favour of the decree, and consequently, the United Provinces of Central Italy became part of the Kingdom of Sardinia.

== Unification with Italy ==
Almost a year after the provinces of central Italy were absorbed into the Kingdom of Sardinia, the Kingdom of Italy was declared on March 17, 1861.

Sardinia - including its royal family and governance - played a key role in the initial structures and establishment of the Kingdom of Italy. The King of Sardinia, Victor Emmanuel II was proclaimed the first king of Italy, presiding over a kingdom that now included the vast majority of the Italian Peninsula, with the exception of Rome and Venice. Meanwhile, the constitution of Sardinia, known as the Albertine Statute, was extended amongst the regions the new basic law of the Italian Kingdom, and the legislature established by the Subalpine Parliament, or Sardinian Senate, was continued on into the new Italian Parliament. However, even with the continuation of elements of Sardinian governance into the new state, the international community did not formally recognise the Kingdom of Italy until 1867, at the London Conference, where the state was named as a sixth power of European states.

Further processes of unification also continued to occur after the Kingdom of Italy's formal creation in 1861. In 1866, Italy joined Prussia in fighting a further war against Austria, with the intent of acquiring additional territory. This war was referred to interchangeably as the Austro-Prussian War, the German War, the Unification War, the German Civil War, the Fraternal or the Third Independence War of Italy. The Kingdom of Italy suffered various defeats through the Battle of Custoza during this war. However, as a result of the conflict, the 1866 Treaty of Prague was signed, formally handing Venice over to the control of the Kingdom of Italy.

Rome subsequently became part of the Kingdom of Italy in September 1870, after French troops withdrew from Rome and the city was captured by Italian troops. Following its capture, in July 1871, Rome was declared the new capital of the Kingdom of Italy, in place of Florence and prior to that, Turin.

By 1871, the Kingdom of Italy was a unified state. It is widely believed this consolidation represented the end of confederative or imperial political structures in Europe, and the rise of a more centralised, national political structure.

== Later changes to territories ==
While it is widely acknowledged that the core unification process establishing the Kingdom of Italy was completed in the Nineteenth century, additional territories and regions were added at various points to the state of Italy following the end of World War I in 1918.

Following World War I, in 1919, Italy signed the Treaty of St Germain, by which it formally obtained the regions of Venezia Tridentina (also referred to as Trentino-Alto Adige, or Trentino-South Tyrol) and Venezia Giulia (also referred to as Julian March), which were previously held by Austria-Hungary.

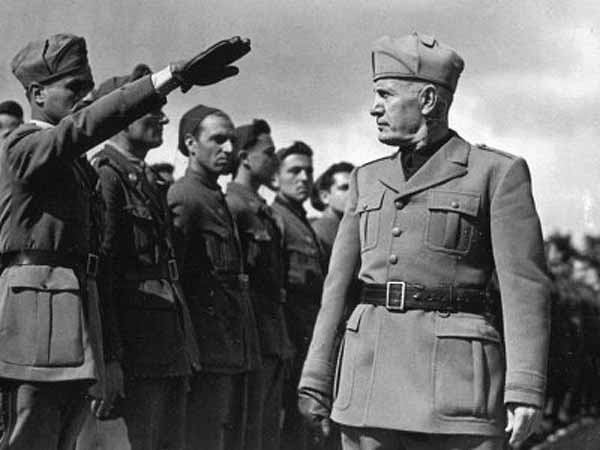
Benito Mussolini in Ethiopia.

These regions had large Italian-speaking populations in its urban and coastal districts, and they were thought necessary to be included within the Italian state in order to complete its natural border.

Later, under the fascist regime led by Benito Mussolini, further expansion of the Italian state occurred, with Italy invading Ethiopia in 1935 and annexing Albania in 1939 before entering World War II on the German side and occupying British Somaliland in East Africa, in 1940.

Later, in 1940 and 1941, British and Allied troops drove the Italian army out of British Somaliland and Ethiopia in East Africa. During this period, Germany also seized control of Albania; rendering all of Italy’s wartime acquisitions unsuccessful.

As of 2025, no further territories or regions have been acquired by Italy, nor have there been any further changes to Italy’s borders.

== See also ==
- Italian Unification
- Grand Duchy of Tuscany
- Duchy of Parma
- Duchy of Modena and Reggio
- Victor Emmanuel II, King of Sardinia
- List of historical states of Italy
- Former countries in Europe after 1815
