= 63rd Infantry Regiment "Cagliari" =

Inactive Italian Army infantry unit

- 63° Reggimento Fanteria "Cagliari"
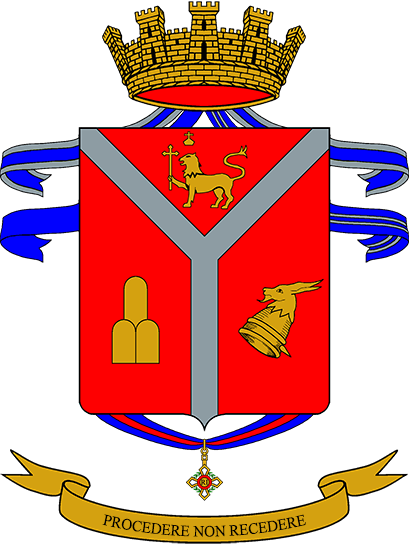
- Regimental coat of arms
- Active: 1 Aug. 1862 – 8 Sept. 1943; 1 Oct. 1976 – 30 Nov. 1991
- Country: Italy
- Branch: Italian Army
- Part of: Mechanized Brigade "Gorizia"
- Garrison/HQ: San Lorenzo Isontino
- Motto: "Procedere non recedere"
- Anniversaries: 2 July 1915 – Battle of Polazzo
- Decorations: 2× Military Order of Italy; 2× Silver Medals of Military Valor; 1× Bronze Medal of Military Valor; 1× War Cross of Military Valor; 1× Croix de guerre avec Palme de bronze

Insignia
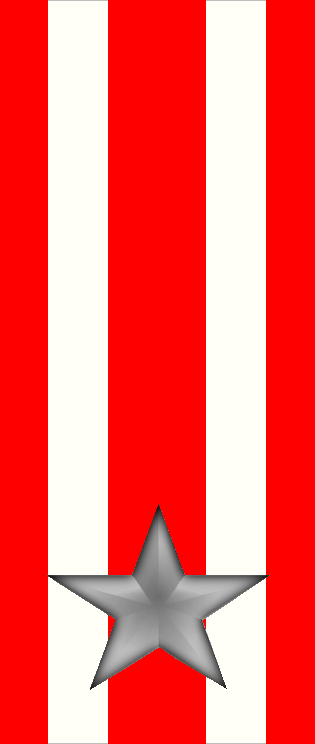
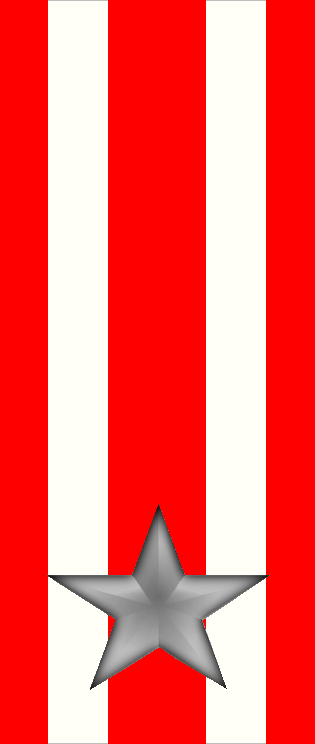
- Regimental gorget patches

The 63rd Infantry Regiment "Cagliari" (Italian: 63° Reggimento Fanteria "Cagliari") is an inactive unit of the Italian Army last based in Albenga. Formed in 1862 the regiment is part of the Italian Army's infantry arm and named for the city of Cagliari in Sardinia.

The regiment was one of ten infantry regiments formed by the Royal Italian Army on 1 August 1862. In 1866, the regiment participated in the Third Italian War of Independence and 1911–12 in the Italo-Turkish War. During World War I, the regiment fought on the Italian front and the Macedonian front. In 1935–36, the regiment participated in the Second Italo-Ethiopian War. During World War II, the regiment was assigned to the 59th Infantry Division "Cagliari", with which it fought in the Greco-Italian War. The division was in the southern Peloponnese in Greece, when the Armistice of Cassibile was announced on 8 September 1943 and was soon thereafter disbanded by invading German forces. The regiment was reformed as battalion sized unit in 1976 and disbanded after the end of the Cold War.

== History ==
=== Formation ===
On 1 August 1862, the 1st Infantry Regiment (Brigade "Re"), 2nd Infantry Regiment (Brigade "Re"), 3rd Infantry Regiment (Brigade "Piemonte"), 4th Infantry Regiment (Brigade "Piemonte"), 5th Infantry Regiment (Brigade "Aosta"), and 6th Infantry Regiment (Brigade "Aosta") ceded their 17th Company and 18th Company to help form the 63rd Infantry Regiment (Brigade "Cagliari") in San Maurizio Canavese. The twelve companies were grouped into three battalions. On the same date the 32nd Infantry Regiment (Brigade "Siena") and the 41st Infantry Regiment (Brigade "Modena") ceded both a depot company to help form the new regiment's depot in Turin, while the 1st Provisional Depot in Trapani in Sicily provided four companies to form the regiment's IV Battalion, which initially remained based in Trapani.

The regiment was assigned, together with the 64th Infantry Regiment, to the Brigade "Cagliari" in Turin. The brigade's command and the 64th Infantry Regiment had also been formed on 1 August 1962, with the 9th Infantry Regiment (Brigade "Regina"), 10th Infantry Regiment (Brigade "Regina"), 15th Infantry Regiment (Brigade "Savona"), 16th Infantry Regiment (Brigade "Savona"), 23rd Infantry Regiment (Brigade "Como"), and 24th Infantry Regiment (Brigade "Como") ceding their 17th Company and 18th Company to help form the three battalions of the 64th Infantry Regiment, while the 33rd Infantry Regiment (Brigade "Livorno") and the 42nd Infantry Regiment (Brigade "Modena") provided both a depot company. The 64th Infantry Regiment's IV Battalion was also formed in Sicily with two companies provided by the 1st Provisional Depot in Trapani and two companies provided by the 2nd Provisional Depot in Palermo. Initially the regiment's IV Battalion remained based in Palermo.

In 1866, the regiment participated in the Third Italian War of Independence and fought in the Battle of Custoza. On 25 October 1871, the brigade level was abolished, and the two regiments of the Brigade "Cagliari" were renamed 63rd Infantry Regiment "Cagliari", respectively 64th Infantry Regiment "Cagliari". On 2 January 1881, the brigade level was reintroduced, and the two regiments were renamed again as 63rd Infantry Regiment (Brigade "Cagliari") and 64th Infantry Regiment (Brigade "Cagliari").

On 1 November 1884, the regiment ceded some of its companies to help form the 88th Infantry Regiment (Brigade "Friuli") in Milan. In 1887, the regiment's 3rd Company participated in the Italo-Ethiopian War of 1887–1889. In 1895–96, the regiment provided nine officers and 235 enlisted for units deployed to Italian Eritrea for the First Italo-Ethiopian War.

=== Italo-Turkish War ===
In 1911, the regiment was deployed to Libya for the Italo-Turkish War. On 17 December 1911, the regiment fought in the First Battle of Zanzur. On 12 March 1912, the regiment fought in the Battle of Due Palme and earned a Silver Medal of Military Valor. On 8 June of the same year, the regiment was fought in the Second Battle of Zanzur. From 16 June to 8 July, the regiment operated in the area of Misrata and on 9 July fought in the Battle of Misrata.

=== World War I ===
At the outbreak of World War I, the Brigade "Cagliari" formed, together with the Brigade "Savona" and the 34th Field Artillery Regiment, the 20th Division. At the time the 63rd Infantry Regiment consisted of three battalions, each of which fielded four fusilier companies and one machine gun section. After Italy's entry into the war on 23 May 1915, the Brigade "Cagliari" was deployed on the Italian front: in June 1915, the brigade fought in the First Battle of the Isonzo against Austro-Hungarian forces on the Karst plateau at Polazzo. In July 1915, the brigade fought in the Second Battle of the Isonzo at Redipuglia. From late July to October 1915, the brigade was deployed on Monte Sei Busi. On 10 December 1915, the 63rd Infantry Regiment's depot in Salerno provided personnel to help form the brigade command of the Brigade "Sele" and the 219th Infantry Regiment (Brigade "Sele").

On 6 May 1916, the 63rd Infantry Regiment's depot in Salerno formed a battalion for the formation of the 231st Infantry Regiment (Brigade "Avellino"). In late May 1916, the brigade was sent as reinforcements to the Sette Comuni plateau, where Austro-Hungarian forces had begun the Battle of Asiago. There the brigade fought on Monte Campomolon, and then in June on Monte Novegno. In July 1916, the brigade was ordered to move to the Macedonian front. On 31 July, the first units of the brigade were transferred by train to Taranto, from where the brigade sailed to Thessaloniki in Greece. By early September 1916, the brigade entered the front near the Doiran Lake. In fall 1916, the brigade fought in the Monastir offensive.

In May 1917, the brigade fought in the Battle of the Crna Bend. In September 1918, the brigade participated in the Vardar offensive and then in the Liberation of Serbia. After the war, the two regiments of the Brigade "Cagliari" were both awarded a Silver Medal of Military Valor for their conduct at Polazzo, Redipuglia, Monte Campomolon, Monte Novegno, and Monastir. The 63rd Infantry Regiment also awarded the French Croix de guerre avec Palme de bronze by General Louis Franchet d'Espèrey, commander of the Allied Army of the Orient.

=== Interwar years ===
On 30 October 1926, the command of the Brigade "Cagliari" and the 64th Infantry Regiment were disbanded, and the regiment's two battalions were transferred to the 55th Infantry Regiment "Marche" and 92nd Infantry Regiment "Basilicata". On 5 November 1926, the 63rd Infantry Regiment, now renamed 63rd Infantry Regiment "Cagliari", was assigned to the XXVI Infantry Brigade, which was the infantry component of the 26th Territorial Division of Salerno. On 30 March 1930, the division moved from Salerno in the South of Italy to Asti in the North and consequently changed its name to 26th Territorial Division of Asti, while the 63rd Infantry Regiment "Cagliari" moved from Salerno to Vercelli. On 8 February 1934, the 26th Territorial Division of Asti changed its name to 26th Infantry Division "Assietta". A name change that also extended to the division's infantry brigade.

=== Second Italo-Ethiopian War ===
In 1935–36, the 26th Infantry Division "Assietta", including the 63rd Infantry Regiment "Cagliari", participated in the Second Italo-Ethiopian War. On 15 September 1935, the division arrived in Libya. In January 1936, the division was shipped to Eritrea. After landing in Massawa in Eritrea the division moved to the Endaga Robo-Enticho-Dek’emhāre region. Then it moved its headquarters to Mek'ele, guarding a front from Doghea to Kwīhā. In February 1936, the division participated in the Battle of Amba Aradam. On 2 March 1936, the Assietta blocked the retreat route of the Ethiopian Army on the front from Yereserē to Edai. But the Ethiopians bypassed the Assietta, breaking through Italian lines further to the east on their way to Amba Alagi. The Assietta, now used as a rear area guard force, followed in March–April 1936 first to Aderat and Amba Alagi and then to Atzalo and Aiba. After the war's conclusion, the division was used for mopping-up operations south of Lake Ashenge. The division's last garrison in Ethiopia was the city of Dessie from September 1936 until the orders to return to Italy were received on 2 February 1937. The 63rd Infantry Regiment "Cagliari" arrived back at its base in Vercelli on 15 May 1937.

On 5 April 1939, the 59th Infantry Division "Cagliari" was reformed in Vercelli and the 64th Infantry Regiment "Cagliari" was reformed in Ivrea. On the same date the 63rd Infantry Regiment "Cagliari" left the 26th Infantry Division "Assietta" and joined the newly formed division.

=== World War II ===
At the outbreak of World War II, the regiment consisted of a command, a command company, three fusilier battalions, a support weapons battery equipped with 65/17 infantry support guns, and a mortar company equipped with 81mm Mod. 35 mortars. In June 1940, the division participated in the Italian invasion of France. On 15 June, the division crossed the border over the Col du Petit Mont-Cenis and by 17 June 1940 had captured Dents d'Ambin, Sommet de la Nunda, Pas de la Beccia and Col de Sollières around Mont Cenis lake. On 21 June 1940, the division reached the Arc river valley and started advancing to Bramans and Le Planey, capturing both on 23 June 1940. An attack towards the Val d'Ambin with the aim to take Modane was stopped by the Franco-Italian Armistice signed on 24 June 1940. For its conduct on the Col du Petit Mont-Cenis the regiment was awarded a War Cross of Military Valor, which was affixed to the regiment's flag and is depicted on the regiment's coat of arms.

On 21 January 1941, the division was ordered to move to Albania to reinforce the Italian front in the Greco-Italian War. On 8 February 1941, the division entered the front near Berat. On 11 March 1941, as part of the Italian Spring Offensive, the division attacked towards Bubës, capturing it on 13 March 1941. The division's assaults of Monastery Hill a few kilometers south on 14–19 March 1941 were unsuccessful.

As a result of Greek units disengaging after the start of the German invasion of Greece on 6 April 1941, the division advanced and reached the pre-war Greek-Albanian border stream of Perati on 20 April 1941. After the Greek surrender, the division was used as occupation force in Kalpaki. In June 1941, the division was transferred to the southern Peloponnese, where garrisons were established in Tripoli, Kalamata and Sparta. The division undertook anti-partisan duties and coastal defence duties until September 1943. After the announcement of the Armistice of Cassibile on 8 September 1943, the Cagliari was disbanded by the German 117. Jäger-Division.

For their conduct during the Greco-Italian War the 63rd Infantry Regiment "Cagliari" and 64th Infantry Regiment "Cagliari" were both awarded a Bronze Medal of Military Valor.

=== Cold War ===
During the 1975 army reform, the army disbanded the regimental level and newly independent battalions were granted for the first time their own flags. On 30 September 1976, the 53rd Infantry Fortification Regiment "Umbria" was disbanded and the next day the regiment's II Battalion in San Lorenzo Isontino became an autonomous unit and was renamed 63rd Infantry Fortification Battalion "Cagliari". On 12 November 1976, the President of the Italian Republic Giovanni Leone assigned with decree 846 the flag and traditions of the 63rd Infantry Regiment "Cagliari" to the 63rd Infantry Fortification Battalion "Cagliari".

The battalion was assigned to the Mechanized Brigade "Gorizia" and consisted of a command, a command and services company, and a varying number of fortification companies and maintenance squads, which were partly detached to Farra d'Isonzo and Lucinico. The battalion was tasked with manning fortifications of the Alpine Wall along the Soča river between Gorizia and Gradisca d'Isonzo in case of war with Yugoslavia.

With the end of the Cold War, the Italian Army began to draw down its forces and Infantry Fortification units were some of the first units to disband. On 30 November 1991, the 63rd Infantry Fortification Battalion "Cagliari" and 120th Infantry Fortification Battalion "Fornovo" were disbanded and the flags of the 63rd Infantry Regiment "Cagliari" and 120th Infantry Regiment "Emilia" were transferred on 5 December 1991 to the Shrine of the Flags in the Vittoriano in Rome.
