= 9th Artillery Regiment "Brennero" =

Inactive Italian Army artillery unit

- 9° Reggimento Artiglieria "Brennero"
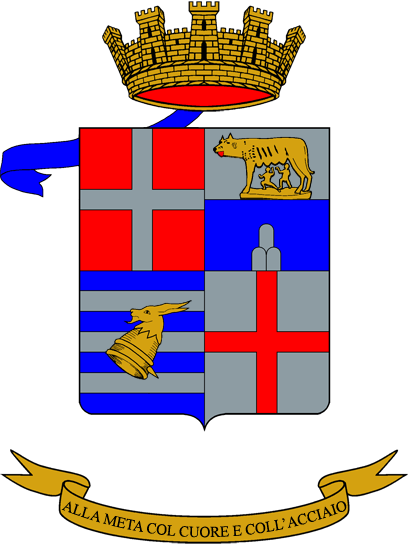
- Regimental coat of arms
- Active: 8 March 1863 — 8 Sept. 1943; 1 May 1947 — 15 May 1963; 21 Oct. 1975 — 29 July 1992
- Country: Italy
- Branch: Italian Army
- Part of: Armored Brigade "Centauro"
- Garrison/HQ: Vercelli
- Motto: "Alla meta col cuore e coll'acciaio"
- Anniversaries: 15 June 1913 - Second Battle of the Piave River
- Decorations: 1x Bronze Medal of Military Valor

Insignia
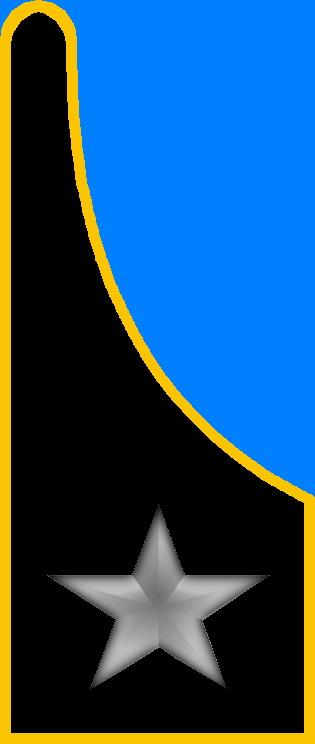
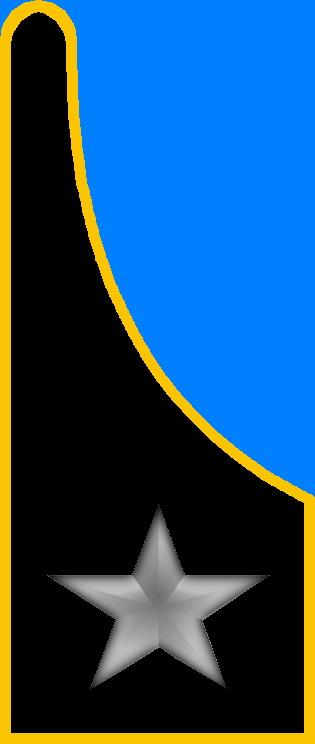
- Regimental gorget patches

The 9th Artillery Regiment "Pistoia" (Italian: 9° Reggimento Artiglieria "Brennero") is an inactive field artillery regiment of the Italian Army, which was based in Vercelli in Piedmont. The regiment was formed in 1861 by the Royal Italian Army and fought in 1866 in the Third Italian War of Independence. During World War I the regiment served on the Italian front. In 1935 the regiment was assigned to the 11th Infantry Division "Brennero". In December 1940 the division was transferred to Albania for the Greco-Italian War. After the German invasion of Greece in April 1941 the division remained in Greece on occupation duty until February 1943, when it moved to Albania to be reorganized as a motorized division. The division and its regiments dissolved after the announcement of the Armistice of Cassibile on 8 September 1943.

The regiment was reformed in 1947 and assigned to the Infantry Division "Friuli". In 1956 the regiment was transferred to the V Army Corps and in 1963 the regiment was disbanded. In 1975 the unit was reformed in Vercelli as 9th Self-propelled Field Artillery Group "Brennero" and assigned to the 31st Armored Brigade "Curtatone". With the end of the Cold War the group was disbanded in 1992. The regimental anniversary falls, as for all Italian Army artillery regiments, on June 15, the beginning of the Second Battle of the Piave River in 1918.

This article is about the Royal Italian Army's 9th Field Artillery Regiment, which was a support unit assigned to a division-level command. This regiment is unrelated to the 9th Heavy Field Artillery Regiment, which was a support unit assigned to a corps-level command, and unrelated to the 9th Heavy Artillery Regiment, which was a support unit assigned to an army-level command.

== History ==
On 8 March 1863 the 10th Artillery Regiment — Field Regiment was formed in Pavia. The new regiment consisted of 15 batteries, three of which had been ceded by the 5th Artillery Regiment — Field Regiment, and four each by the 6th Artillery Regiment — Field Regiment, 7th Artillery Regiment — Field Regiment and 8th Artillery Regiment — Field Regiment. Some of the ceded batteries had fought in the First Italian War of Independence, Second Italian War of Independence, and the Piedmontese invasion of Central and Southern Italy. On 18 December 1864 the 1st Artillery Regiment — Workers Regiment was disbanded, and on 1 January 1865 the 9th Artillery Regiment — Pontieri Regiment was renumbered as 1st Artillery Regiment — Pontieri Regiment and consequently the 10th Artillery Regiment — Field Regiment was renumbered as 9th Artillery Regiment — Field Regiment. In 1866 the regiment participated in the Third Italian War of Independence. On 20 September 1870 the regiment's batteries participated in the capture of Rome: the 5th, 6th and 8th were deployed at Porta Pia, while the 4th, 7th and 12th were at Porta San Giovanni.

On 13 November 1870 the regiment was renamed 9th Artillery Regiment and on 1 January 1871 it ceded two batteries to help form a new 10th Artillery Regiment. On 30 September 1873 the regiment ceded its remaining four fortress companies to help form the 13th Fortress Artillery Regiment. On 29 June 1882 the regiment was renamed 9th Field Artillery Regiment. On 1 November 1884 the regiment ceded two batteries to help from the 11th Field Artillery Regiment and on 1 November 1888 the regiment ceded eight batteries and one train company to help form the 21st Field Artillery Regiment.

On 1 March 1895 the regimed ceded one field battery to the 5th Field Artillery Regiment, which on the same date ceded its six mountain batteries to the Mountain Artillery Regiment. In 1895-96 the regiment provided two officers and 42 troops to augment units deployed to Eritrea for the First Italo-Ethiopian War. During the Italo-Turkish War in 1911-12 the regiment provided three officers and 48 troops to from one battery and provided 45 officers and 348 troops to augment units deployed for the war. On 1 January 1915 the regiment ceded its II Group to help form the 35th Field Artillery Regiment.

=== World War I ===
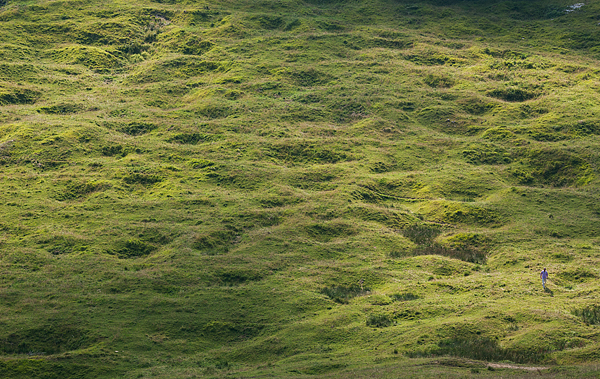
The flanks of Monte Valbella are still today pockmarked by thousands and artillery craters

At the outbreak of World War I the regiment was assigned to the XI Army Corps as the corps' artillery regiment. At the time the regiment consisted of a command, three groups with a combined eight batteries equipped with 75/27 mod. 11 field guns, and a depot. During the war the regiment's depot in Pavia formed the commands of the 45th Field Artillery Regiment and 46th Field Artillery Regiment. The depot also formed the command of the 6th Heavy Field Artillery Grouping, five heavy field howitzer groups, and one heavy field cannons group. During the war the regiment fought initially at Sagrado and Sdraussina, before moving to Monte San Michele for the First Battle of the Isonzo and Second Battle of the Isonzo. Afterwards the regiment was deployed to San Martino del Carso for the Fourth Battle of the Isonzo. In June 1916 the regiment fought again on Monte San Michele and in August of the same year participated in the Battle of Gorizia. Afterwards the regiment was deployed at Opatje Selo and then moved to the hills around Miren Castle for the Seventh Battle of the Isonzo, Eighth Battle of the Isonzo, and Ninth Battle of the Isonzo. In fall 1917, during the disastrous Battle of Caporetto, the regiment was sent to the Asiago plateau, where it spent December on the Melette massiv and on Monte Sisemol. The regiment spent Christmas 1917 on the flanks of Monte Valbella, whose flanks are still today pockmarked by thousands and artillery craters. During the decisive Battle of Vittorio Veneto in October 1918 the regiment was deployed in the Val Lagarina, from where it pursued retreating Austro-Hungarian troops and reached Trento by the end of the war.

In 1920 the regiment moved from Pavia to Trento. In 1926 the regiment was assigned to the 11th Territorial Division of Bolzano and consisted of a command, one group with 100/17 mod. 14 howitzers, one group with 75/27 mod. 06 field guns, two groups with mule-carried 75/13 mod. 15 mountain guns, and a depot. The same year the regiment received the IV Group with 100/17 mod. 14 howitzers from the 3rd Mountain Artillery Regiment, while ceding two of its groups to help reform the 28th Field Artillery Regiment and 29th Field Artillery Regiment.

In January 1935 the 11th Territorial Division of Bolzano was renamed 11th Infantry Division "Brennero" and consequently the regiment was renamed 9th Artillery Regiment "Brennero". In 1935 the regiment provided six officers, 16 non-commissioned officers and 265 troops to augment units deployed for the Second Italo-Ethiopian War. In 1936 the regiment moved from Trento to Bolzano.

On 4 September 1939 the depot of the regiment in Bolzano reformed the 33rd Artillery Regiment "Acqui" and afterwards transferred the regiment its I Group with 100/17 mod. 14 howitzers and III Group with 75/13 mod. 15 mountain guns to the reformed regiment. At the same time the 9th Artillery Regiment "Brennero" ceded its II Group with 75/27 mod. 06 field guns to help reform the 55th Artillery Regiment, which was on the way to Libya, where it would join the 27th Infantry Division "Brescia". To help rebuild the 9th Artillery Regiment "Brennero" it received a group with 75/13 mod. 15 mountain guns from the 12th Artillery Regiment "Savona", when that regiment departed for Libya on 11 September of the same year.

=== World War II ===
On 10 June 1940, the day Italy entered World War II, the regiment consisted of a command, command unit, one group with 100/17 mod. 14 howitzers, two groups with 75/13 mod. 15 mountain guns, and an anti-aircraft battery with 20/65 mod. 35 anti-aircraft guns. The regiment was assigned to the 11th Infantry Division "Brennero", which also included the 231st Infantry Regiment "Brennero" and 232nd Infantry Regiment "Brennero".

During the Greco-Italian War the division was sent as reinforcement to Albania in December 1940. On 9–12 February 1941 Brennero helped to defeat a Greek attack on Tepelenë, with about two-thirds of the division becoming casualties. After the German invasion of Greece the division was deployed to Athens and tasked with counter-insurgency and police duties. For its conduct and sacrifice during the Greco-Italian War regiment was awarded a Bronze Medal of Military Valor, which was affixed on the regiment's flag and is depicted on the regiment's coats of arms.

On 1 November 1942 the regiment's three groups became autonomous and left the regiment, which received during the same month the XLVII Anti-aircraft Group with 75/46 C.A. mod. 34 anti-aircraft guns and the DLVIII Self-propelled Group with Semovente da 75/18 self-propelled guns as replacements. In December 1942 the regiment received a group with 75/27 mod. 06 field guns and a group with 75/32 mod. 37 field guns. In January 1943 the regiment received a second group with 75/32 mod. 37 field guns. By early 1943 the regiment was organized as follows:

- 9th Artillery Regiment "Brennero"
  - Command Unit
  - I Group with 75/27 mod. 06 field guns
  - II Group with 75/32 mod. 37 field guns
  - III Group with 75/32 mod. 37 field guns
  - XLVII Anti-aircraft Group with 75/46 C.A. mod. 34 anti-aircraft guns
  - DLVIII Self-propelled Group with Semovente da 75/18 (on M14/41 chassis) self-propelled guns

In February 1943 the division moved to Durrës in Albania to begin its conversion to motorized division. After the Armistice of Cassibile was announced on 8 September 1943 the division dissolved chaotically, when its commanding officer Generale di Brigata Aldo Princivalle sided with attacking German forces.

=== Cold War ===
On 1 May 1947 the 35th Field Artillery Regiment ceded its V Group and the newly formed V/bis Group, both equipped with QF 17-pounder anti-tank guns, to help reform the 9th Anti-tank Field Artillery Regiment in Brixen. The reformed regiment was assigned to the Infantry Division "Friuli" and consisted of a command, a command unit, the I and II groups with QF 17-pounder anti-tank guns, and the III and IV groups with QF 6-pounder anti-tank guns. In November 1947 the regiment moved from Brixen to Lucca. On 1 January 1951 the Infantry Division "Friuli" included the following artillery regiments:

- Infantry Division "Friuli", in Florence
  - 8th Field Artillery Regiment, in Livorno
  - 9th Anti-tank Field Artillery Regiment, in Lucca
  - 35th Field Artillery Regiment, in Rimini
  - 3rd Light Anti-aircraft Artillery Regiment, in Pisa

On 1 January 1952 the regiment was reorganized and renamed 9th Field Artillery Regiment. The regiment now consisted of the following units:

- 9th Field Artillery Regiment, in Lucca
  - Command Unit
  - I Group with 100/17 mod. 14 howitzers (replaced with M101 105 mm howitzers in the second half of 1952)
  - II Group with 100/17 mod. 14 howitzers (replaced with M101 105 mm howitzers in the second half of 1952)
  - III Light Anti-aircraft Group with 40/56 anti-aircraft autocannons
  - Anti-tank Sub-grouping
    - IV Anti-tank Group with QF 17-pounder anti-tank guns
    - V Anti-tank Group with QF 17-pounder anti-tank guns

On 1 December 1953 the regiment was once again reorganized and renamed 9th Army Corps Self-propelled Artillery Regiment. The regiment now consisted of a command, a command unit, the II Self-propelled Group with M7 Priest self-propelled guns, and two anti-tank groups with QF 17-pounder anti-tank guns. The two anti-tank groups were equipped with M36 tank destroyers and then renamed CIII and CIV self-propelled anti-tank groups. On 30 September 1956 the II Self-propelled Group with M7 Priest self-propelled guns left the regiment and moved to Banne, where it joined the Artillery Command of the V Army Corps. On 1 January 1957 the regiment received the CXI and CXII self-propelled anti-tank groups with M36 tank destroyers from the 13th Field Artillery Regiment. On the same date the regiment was renamed 9th Self-propelled Anti-tank Artillery Regiment.

On 1 September 1962 the CIII Self-propelled Anti-tank Group with M36 tank destroyers left the regiment and became an autonomous unit. The group moved to Meran, where it was assigned to IV Army Corps. On 15 May 1963 the 9th Self-propelled Anti-tank Artillery Regiment and its remaining groups were disbanded.

During the 1975 army reform the army disbanded the regimental level and newly independent battalions and groups were granted for the first time their own flags. On 21 October 1975 the IV Self-propelled Group of the 131st Armored Artillery Regiment in Vercelli was reorganized and renamed 9th Self-propelled Field Artillery Group "Brennero" and assigned to the 31st Armored Brigade "Curtatone". The group consisted of a command, a command and services battery, and three batteries equipped with M44 155 mm self-propelled howitzers, which were quickly replaced by M109G 155 mm self-propelled howitzers. At the time the group fielded 477 men (38 officers, 62 non-commissioned officers, and 377 soldiers). On 12 November 1976 the President of the Italian Republic Giovanni Leone assigned with decree 846 the flag and traditions of the 9th Artillery Regiment "Brennero" to the group.

In 1986 the Italian Army abolished the divisional level and brigades, which until then had been under one of the Army's four divisions, came under direct command of the Army's 3rd Army Corps or 5th Army Corps. As the Armored Division "Centauro" carried the traditions of the 131st Armored Division "Centauro", which had distinguished itself in the Tunisian campaign of World War II, the army decided to retain the name of the division. On 31 October 1986 the Centauro's division command in Novara was disbanded and the next day the command of the 31st Armored Brigade "Curtatone" moved from Bellinzago Novarese to Novara, where the command was renamed 31st Armored Brigade "Centauro". The brigade retained the Curtatone's units, including the 9th Self-propelled Field Artillery Group "Brennero".

=== Recent times ===
With the end of the Cold War the Italian Army began to draw down its forces. On 29 July 1992 the 9th Self-propelled Field Artillery Group "Brennero" in Vercelli was disbanded and the next day the 131st Heavy Field Artillery Group "Vercelli", which was also based in Vercelli, exited the Horse Artillery Regiment and entered the reformed 131st Self-propelled Field Artillery Regiment "Centauro", which incorporated the personnel and M109L self-propelled howitzers of the disbanded Brennero group. On 9 October of the same year the flag of the 9th Artillery Regiment "Brennero" was transferred to the Shrine of the Flags in the Vittoriano in Rome.
