= 35th Artillery Regiment "Friuli" =

Inactive Italian Army artillery unit

- 35° Reggimento Artiglieria "Friuli"
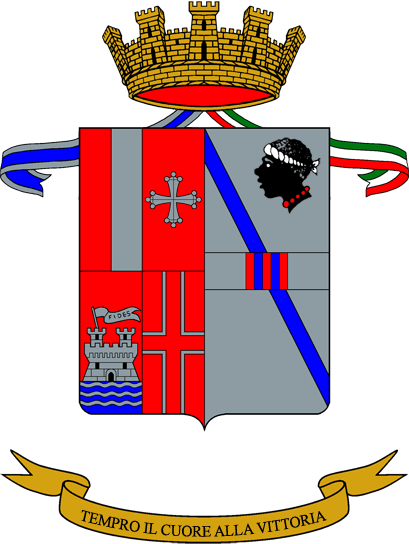
- Regimental coat of arms
- Active: 1 Jan. 1915 — 1 Aug. 1920; 4 Sept. 1939 — 6 April 1964; 23 Sept. 1975 — 6 May 1991
- Country: Italy
- Branch: Italian Army
- Part of: Motorized Brigade "Friuli"
- Garrison/HQ: Pistoia
- Motto: "Tempro il cuore alla vittoria"
- Anniversaries: 15 June 1918 - Second Battle of the Piave River
- Decorations: 1x Silver Medal of Military Valor; 1x Bronze Medal of Civil Valor

Insignia
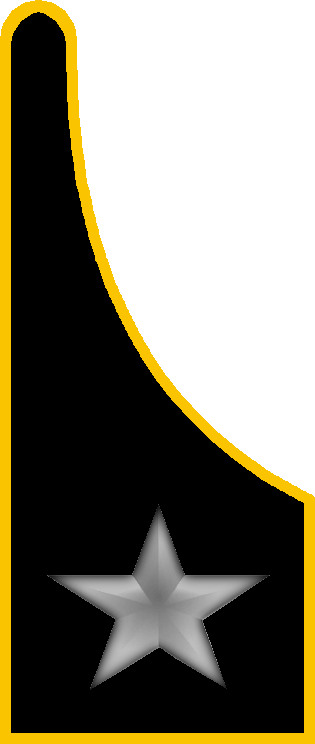
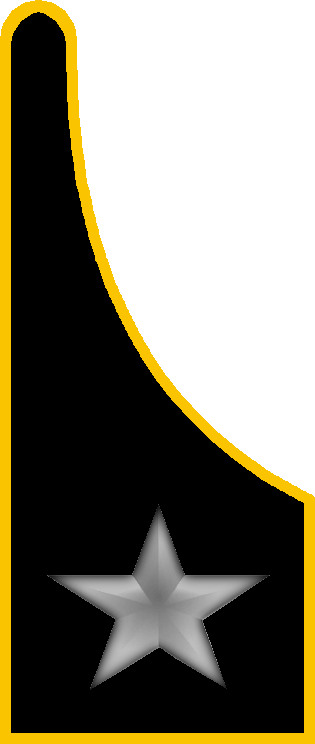
- Regimental gorget patches

The 35th Artillery Regiment "Friuli" (Italian: 35° Reggimento Artiglieria "Friuli") is an inactive field artillery regiment of the Italian Army, which was based in Pistoia in Tuscany. Originally an artillery regiment of the Royal Italian Army, the regiment was formed in 1915 and served in World War I, before being disbanded after the war. The regiment was reformed in 1939 and assigned in World War II to the 20th Infantry Division "Friuli", with which the regiment was deployed to Corsica. When the Armistice of Cassibile was announced on 8 September 1943 the division immediately battled retreating German Wehrmacht forces and then joined the Italian Co-belligerent Army. Equipped with British materiel the regiment entered the Combat Group "Friuli", which was assigned to the II Polish Corps for the Italian campaign.

After the war the regiment served as anti-tank unit before being disbanded in 1964. The unit's traditions were assigned to the Field Artillery Group "Friuli" of the Infantry Brigade "Friuli". In 1975 the group was renamed 35th Field Artillery Group "Riolo" and received the flag and traditions of the regiment. In 1991 the unit was disbanded. The regimental anniversary falls, as for all Italian Army artillery regiments, on June 15, the beginning of the Second Battle of the Piave River in 1918.

== History ==
On 1 January 1915 the 35th Field Artillery Regiment was formed in Bari with five batteries ceded by the 9th Field Artillery Regiment (4th and 5th battery) and the 15th Field Artillery Regiment (6th, 7th, and 8th battery).

=== World War I ===
At the outbreak of World War I the regiment was assigned, together with the Brigade "Regina" and Brigade "Pisa", to the 21st Division. At the time the regiment consisted of a command, three groups with a combined eight batteries equipped with 75/27 mod. 11 field guns, two reserve pack batteries with 70/15 mountain guns, and a depot. During the war the regiment's depot in Bari formed the three mountain artillery batteries and one siege battery.

During the war the regiment served on the Italian front, where it fought in summer 1915 at Gradisca and Sagrado, and then on Monte San Michele. In 1916 the regiment was transferred to the Asiago plateau for the Battle of Asiago, during which the regiment fought on Monte Castelgomberto. In August of the same year the regiment fought on the Cima della Caldiera. In fall 1917 the regiment fought on Monte Meletta di Gallio and on Monte Tondarecar. In the Second Battle of the Piave River in June 1918 the regiment was positioned near Candelù. During the decisive Battle of Vittorio Veneto the regiment crossed the Piave at Ormelle, where the news of the Armistice of Villa Giusti reached the regiment.

On 1 August 1920 the regiment was disbanded and its units were transferred to the 14th Field Artillery Regiment.

=== World War II ===
On 4 September 1939 the depot of the 7th Artillery Regiment "Cremona" in Pisa reformed the 35th Artillery Regiment "Friuli". The regiment was based in Pisa and assigned to the 20th Infantry Division "Friuli", which also included the 87th Infantry Regiment "Friuli" and 88th Infantry Regiment "Friuli". The regiment consisted of a command, a command unit, and the 35th Anti-aircraft Battery with 20/65 mod. 35 anti-aircraft guns, which had been formed by the 7th Artillery Regiment "Cremona", while the regiment's III Group with 75/13 mod. 15 mountain guns had been transferred from the 7th Artillery Regiment "Cremona". To complete its organization the reformed regiment received the I Group with 100/17 mod. 14 howitzers and the II Group with 75/13 mod. 15 mountain guns from the depot of the 19th Artillery Regiment "Venezia".

In April 1941 the regiment transferred its III Group with 75/13 mod. 15 mountain guns to the 41st Artillery Regiment "Firenze", which in turn transferred its III Group with 75/27 mod. 11 field guns to the 35th Artillery Regiment "Friuli". After the Allied landings in French North Africa Italy and Germany occupied Vichy France on 11 November 1942 and the 20th Infantry Division "Friuli" and the 44th Infantry Division "Cremona" were ferried from Tuscany to northern Corsica. At the end of 1942 the regiment consisted of a command, a command unit, the I Group with 100/17 mod. 14 howitzers, the II Group with 75/27 mod. 11 field guns, the III Group with 75/18 mod. 34 mountain guns, and the 320th and 356th anti-aircraft batteries with 20/65 mod. 35 anti-aircraft guns. In February 1943 the regiment added the IV Group with 75/18 mod. 34 mountain guns.

After the Armistice of Cassibile was announced on 8 September 1943 the Italian forces and French partisans on Corsica fought the German units, which had crossed over from Sardinia and retreated towards the harbor of Bastia in the Corsica's north. On 13 September elements of the Free French 4th Moroccan Mountain Division landed in Ajaccio to support the Italian efforts to stop the 30,000 retreating German troops, but during the night of 3–4 October the last German units were evacuated from Bastia. After the end of operations on Corsica the Friuli was transferred with all other Italian units from Corsica to Sardinia, where the units joined the Italian Co-belligerent Army.

On 15 June 1944 the regiment received the CXXV Group with 149/13 mod. 14 (A) heavy howitzers from the 7th Army Corps Artillery Regiment. In July 1944 the division and its regiments were transferred to southern Italy, where they were equipped with British weapons and materiel. On 20 September 1944 the 20th Infantry Division "Friuli" was reorganized as Combat Group "Friuli" and the 35th Artillery Regiment "Friuli" was now organized as follows:

- 35th Artillery Regiment "Friuli"
  - Command Unit
  - I Group with QF 25-pounder field guns
  - II Group with QF 25-pounder field guns
  - III Group with QF 25-pounder field guns
  - IV Group with QF 25-pounder field guns
  - V Group with QF 17-pounder anti-tank guns
  - VI Group with 40/56 anti-aircraft autocannons
  - 2 × mobile workshops

On 5 February 1945 Combat Group "Friuli" entered the front on the Senio river. On 11 April the combat group and the Jewish Brigade crossed the Senio and liberated Riolo before advancing with the allied armies to liberate Imola, Castel San Pietro and Bologna. For its conduct in Corsica and during the Italian campaign the regiment was awarded a Silver Medal of Military Valor, which was affixed to the regiment's flag and is depicted on the regiment's coat of arms.

=== Cold War ===
After the war the regiment was based in Trento. On 15 October 1945 the Combat Group "Friuli" was reorganized as Infantry Division "Friuli". On 1 January 1947 the regiment was renamed 35th Field Artillery Regiment and ceded its I and II groups with QF 25-pounder field guns to help reform the 8th Field Artillery Regiment. On 1 May of the same year the regiment ceded its V Group and newly formed V/bis Group, both equipped with QF 17-pounder anti-tank guns, to help reform the 9th Anti-tank Field Artillery Regiment. On the same date the regiment ceded its VI Anti-aircraft Group and newly formed VI/bis Anti-aircraft Group, both equipped with 40/56 autocannons, to help reform the 3rd Light Anti-aircraft Artillery Regiment. Afterwards the regiment consisted of a command, a command unit, and the I, II, and III groups with QF 25-pounder field guns. Later in the same year the regiment moved from Trento to Rimini. On 1 January 1951 the Infantry Division "Friuli" included the following artillery regiments:

- Infantry Division "Friuli", in Florence
  - 8th Field Artillery Regiment, in Livorno
  - 9th Anti-tank Field Artillery Regiment, in Lucca
  - 35th Field Artillery Regiment, in Rimini
  - 3rd Light Anti-aircraft Artillery Regiment, in Pisa

On 1 January 1952 the regiment's III Group reorganized as an anti-aircraft group and equipped with 40/56 autocannons. On 1 December 1953 the regiment left the Infantry Division "Friuli" and was assigned to the VII Territorial Military Command. The regiment was renamed 35th Army Corps Self-propelled Artillery Regiment and consisted of the following units:

- 35th Army Corps Self-propelled Artillery Regiment, in Rimini
  - Command Unit
  - VI Self-propelled Group with Sexton self-propelled howitzers
  - Self-propelled Anti-tank Sub-grouping, in Modena
    - CV Self-propelled Group with M18 Hellcat tank destroyers (from the 21st Field Artillery Regiment)
    - CVI Self-propelled Group with M18 Hellcat tank destroyers (from the 21st Field Artillery Regiment)

On 15 January 1954 the regiment moved from Rimini to Piacenza and in June 1955 to Modena. On 1 January 1957 the regiment's VI Group became autonomous as VI Self-propelled Field Artillery Group and was assigned to VI Army Corps. On the same date the regiment changed its name to 35th Self-propelled Anti-tank Artillery Regiment. On 1 May 1957 the regiment received the 1st Self-propelled Anti-tank Sub-grouping in Fossano from the 7th Field Artillery Regiment. The Subgrouping consisted of the CIX and CX self-propelled anti-tank groups with M36 tank destroyers. On 1 March 1962 the regiment formed the CVII Self-propelled Anti-tank Group with M36 tank destroyers and on 1 June the CV Self-propelled Group exchanged its M18 Hellcat tank destroyers with M36 tank destroyers. On 1 October of the same year the VI Self-propelled Field Artillery Group returned to the regiment and was renumbered as IV Group. On the same day the regiment transferred the CV Self-propelled Anti-tank Group to the 14th Field Artillery Regiment in Trieste. In the following months the regiment formed the VIII Self-propelled Anti-tank Group and replaced its remaining M18 Hellcats with M36 tank destroyers. By the end of 1962 regiment consisted of the following units:

- 35th Self-propelled Anti-tank Artillery Regiment, in Modena
  - Command Unit
  - IV Self-propelled Group with Sexton self-propelled howitzers
  - VI Self-propelled Anti-tank Group with M36 tank destroyers
  - VII Self-propelled Anti-tank Group with M36 tank destroyers
  - VIII Self-propelled Anti-tank Group with M36 tank destroyers (Reserve)
  - IX Self-propelled Anti-tank Group with M36 tank destroyers
  - X Self-propelled Anti-tank Group with M36 tank destroyers (Reserve)

On 1 April 1964 the regiment's IV Group became once more autonomous as VI Self-propelled Field Artillery Group and was assigned again to the VI Army Corps. On 6 April of the same year the 35th Self-propelled Anti-tank Artillery Regiment and its self-propelled anti-tank groups were disbanded.

After the regiment had been disbanded its traditions, but not its flag, were transferred to the Field Artillery Group "Friuli". That group had been formed on 18 April 1960 with the personnel and materiel of the 8th Field Artillery Regiment's II Mixed Group, which had been ceded on 1 January 1947 by the 35th Field Artillery Regiment to the 8th Field Artillery Regiment. The Field Artillery Group "Friuli" was based in Livorno and consisted of three batteries with QF 25-pounder field guns and one anti-aircraft battery with 40/56 autocannons. On 3 June 1960 the group became an autonomous and was assigned to the Infantry Brigade "Friuli".

In 1961 the group replaced its QF 25-pounder field guns with 105/14 mod. 56 pack howitzers. In 1963 the anti-aircraft battery was disbanded and the group was equipped with towed 105/22 mod. 14/61 howitzers. During the same year the group moved from Livorno to Rovezzano in Florence. For its conduct after the 1966 flood of the Arno the group was awarded a Bronze Medal of Civil Valor, which was affixed to the regiment's flag and is depicted on the regiment's coat of arms. In 1973 the group moved from Rovezzano to Pistoia.

As part of the 1975 army reform the Field Artillery Group "Friuli" was renamed 35th Field Artillery Group "Riolo" on 23 September 1975. To avoid confusion with the support units of the Motorized Brigade "Friuli" the group was named for Riolo, where the 35th Artillery Regiment "Friuli" had distinguished itself in April 1945. The group was assigned to the Motorized Brigade "Friuli" and consisted of a command, a command and services battery, and three batteries with towed M114 155mm howitzers.

On 12 November 1976 the President of the Italian Republic Giovanni Leone assigned with decree 846 the flag and traditions of the 35th Artillery Regiment "Friuli" to the group. At the time the group fielded 485 men (37 officers, 58 non-commissioned officers, and 390 soldiers).

At the end of 1976 the group received the materiel for a reserve light anti-aircraft section. In 1986 one of the group's three batteries replaced its towed M114 155mm howitzers with 105/14 mod. 56 pack howitzers. In August 1987 the light anti-aircraft section was disbanded and the group formed a Self-defense Anti-aircraft Missile Battery, which was equipped with FIM-92 Stinger man-portable air-defense systems.

=== Recent times ===
On 6 May 1991 the 35th Field Artillery Group "Riolo" was disbanded and 5 June of the same year the flag of the 35th Artillery Regiment "Friuli" was returned to the Shrine of the Flags in the Vittoriano in Rome.
