= Podgora (hill) =

Hill in Italy

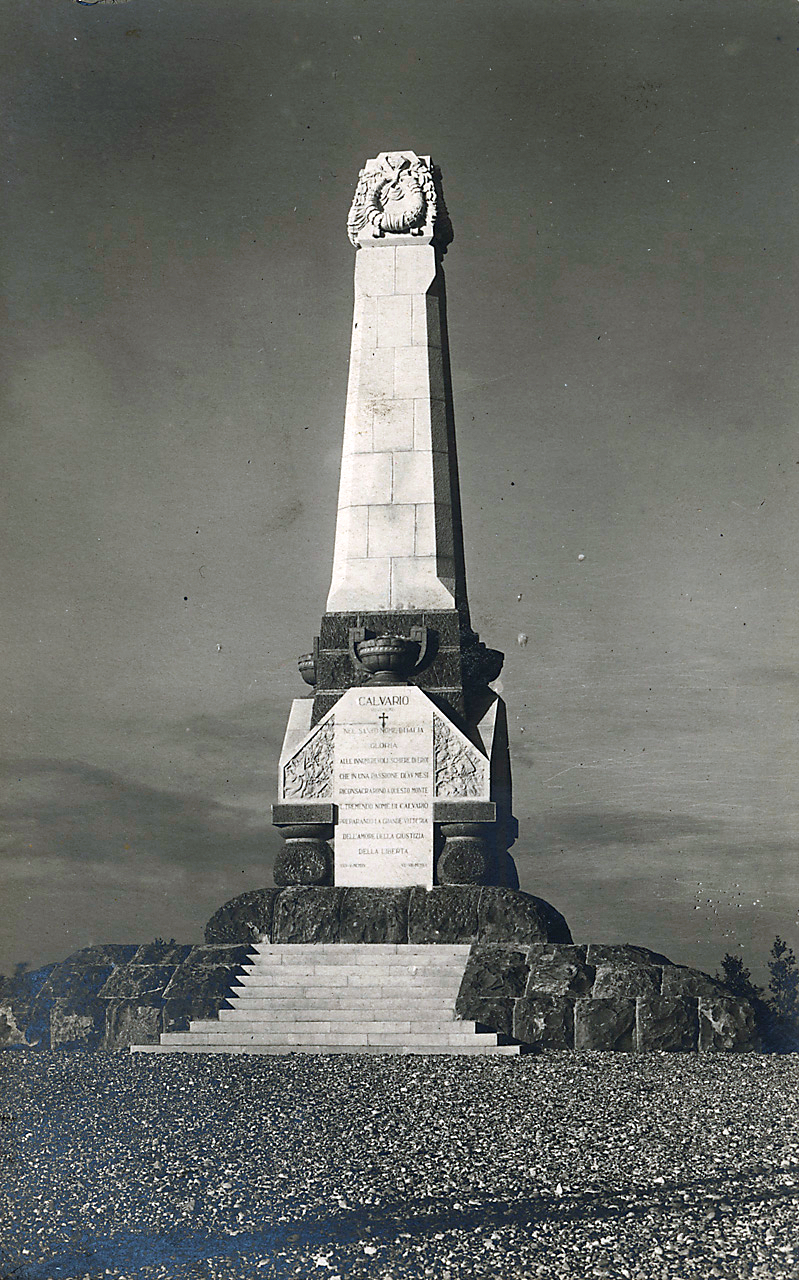
- World War I memorial on Podgora

Highest point
- Elevation: 241 m (791 ft)
- Coordinates: 45°56′44″N 13°35′30″E

Geography
- Location: Friuli-Venezia Giulia, Italy
- Parent range: Karst plateau

Podgora, also known in Italian as Monte Calvario and in Slovene as Kalvarija, is a hill on the Karst plateau west of Gorizia, on the right bank of the Isonzo, with an elevation of 241 meters above sea level. It is historically subdivided in two hills, Podgora (241 meters) and Calvario (184 meters). Due to its commanding position over the Isonzo valley and the Gorizia plain, it was the theatre of bitter fighting during the First World War, from June 1915 to August 1916.

Along with Sabotin and San Michele, Podgora was one of the main bulwarks of the Austro-Hungarian defense of Gorizia during the early battles of the Isonzo, being heavily fortified with multiple orders of trenches, barbed wire and machine-gun posts. Hill was held by Dalmatian 23rd Landwehr Regiment of the 58th Infantry Division. The Podgora was repeatedly attacked by Italian troops in June 1915, before and during the First Battle of the Isonzo, without success, and in July, before and during the Second Battle of the Isonzo, when a regiment of Carabinieri managed to make some gains. Further advance occurred in October 1915, during the Third Battle of the Isonzo, and in November, during the Fourth Battle of the Isonzo when the Italian captured the Calvario summit (184 meters). The summit of the Podgora (241 meters) was finally captured by the "Casale" Infantry Brigade on 8 August 1916, during the Sixth Battle of the Isonzo; Gorizia fell shortly thereafter.
