= 231st Infantry Regiment "Avellino" =

Inactive Italian Army infantry unit

- 231° Reggimento Fanteria "Avellino"
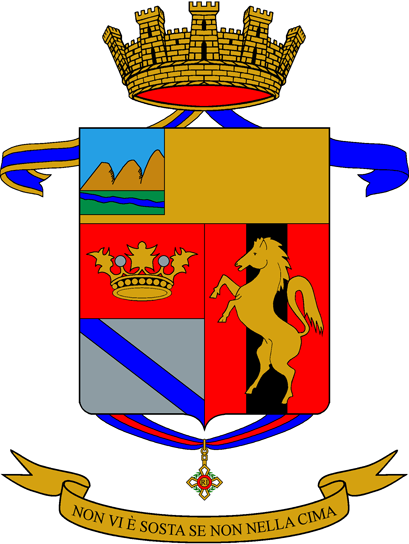
- Regimental coat of arms
- Active: 6 May 1916 – 8 Sept. 1943; 1 Jan. 1950 – 20 Oct. 1965; 1 Nov. 1975 – 28 Sept. 2004
- Country: Italy
- Branch: Italian Army
- Garrison/HQ: Avellino
- Motto: "Non vi è sosta se non nella cima"
- Anniversaries: 15 May 1917 – Conquest of Zagomila
- Decorations: 1× Military Order of Italy; 1× Gold Medal of Military Valor; 1× Bronze Medal of Military Valor; 1× Bronze Medal of Civil Merit

Insignia
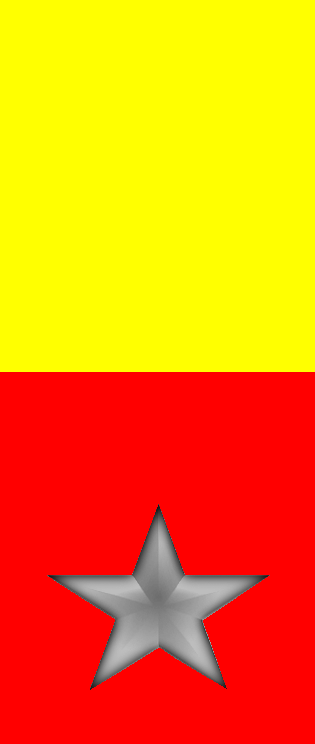
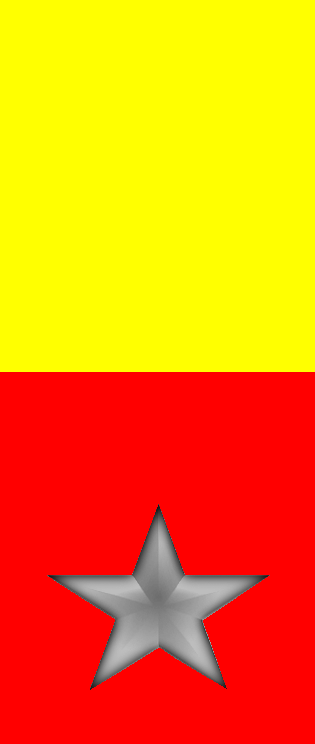
- Regimental gorget patches

The 231st Infantry Regiment "Avellino" (Italian: 231° Reggimento Fanteria "Avellino") is an inactive infantry unit of the Italian Army. The regiment is named for the southern Italian city of Avellino and part of the Italian Army's infantry arm.

The regiment was formed during World War I and fought during the war on the Italian front, for which the regiment was awarded Italy's highest military honor the Gold Medal of Military Valor. After the war the regiment was based in the newly annexed province of South Tyrol. During World War II the regiment was assigned to the 11th Infantry Division "Brennero", which participated in 1940 in the Italian invasion of France and in 1942 in the Greco-Italian War. The division was in Albania, when it was informed of the Armistice of Cassibile on 8 September 1943. The division and regiment were disbanded by invading German forces, while the regiment's I Battalion joined with the 41st Infantry Division "Firenze" in fighting the Germans. In 1950 the regiment was reformed and then disbanded in 1965. The regiment was once more reformed in 1975 as a battalion sized training unit, which in 1991 was used to reform the regiment. The regiment continued as training unit until it was disbanded again in 2004.

== History ==
=== World War I ===
The 231st Infantry Regiment (Brigade "Avellino") was formed during World War I on 6 May 1916 in Camposampiero near the Italian Front. The regiment consisted of three battalions, which each fielded four fusilier companies and one machine gun section. The three battalions had been formed by the regimental depots of the 60th Infantry Regiment (Brigade "Calabria") in Viterbo, 63rd Infantry Regiment (Brigade "Cagliari") in Salerno, and 82nd Infantry Regiment (Brigade "Torino") in Rome.

On 27 May 1917 the regiment was assigned to the Brigade "Avellino", which had been formed by the regimental depot of the 82nd Infantry Regiment. The 231st Infantry Regiment was joined in the brigade by the 232nd Infantry Regiment (Brigade "Avellino"), which had been formed on 24 May 1916 with battalions formed by the regimental depots of the 10th Infantry Regiment (Brigade "Regina") in Bari, 75th Infantry Regiment (Brigade "Napoli") in Syracuse, and 86th Infantry Regiment (Brigade "Verona") in Palermo.

The brigade soon departed for the Italian Front, where it fought in August 1916 in the Battle of Gorizia, and then in November of the same year in the Ninth Battle of the Isonzo. In May 1917 the brigade fought in the Tenth Battle of the Isonzo, during which it conquered Zagomila and Zagora, and participated in the conquest of Mount Vodice. In June 1918 the brigade fought in the Second Battle of the Piave River near Fossalta di Piave. In October 1918 the brigade fought in the Battle of Vittorio Veneto, initially at Romanziol, and after the Italian breakthrough of the Austrian lines at Motta di Livenza and then at the bridge over the Tagliamento river at Madrisio.

For their conduct during the war both regiments of the Brigade "Avellino" were awarded Italy's highest military honor, the Gold Medal of Military Valor.

=== Interwar years ===
After World War I the Royal Italian Army disbanded the brigades and the regiments formed during the war, with the exception of brigades, whose regiments had both been awarded a Gold Medal of Military Valor. As the regiments of the Avellino had no regimental depots of their own, the brigade moved in 1920 to the newly conquered region of South Tyrol, with the 231st taking over the barracks of the Austro-Hungarian Army in Meran and the 232nd taking over the barracks in Bolzano.

On 15 October 1926 the brigade was renamed XI Infantry Brigade and its two regiments were renamed 231st Infantry Regiment "Avellino", respectively 232nd Infantry Regiment "Avellino". On the same date the brigade received the 18th Infantry Regiment "Acqui" in Trento from the disbanded Brigade "Acqui". On 31 October of the same year the 231st and the 232nd regiments received both a battalion from the disbanded 80th Infantry Regiment "Roma". The XI Infantry Brigade was the infantry component of the 11th Territorial Division of Bolzano.

In 1934 the division changed its name to 11th Infantry Division "Brennero". A name change that also extended to the division's infantry brigade. In 1935 the 18th Infantry Regiment "Acqui" moved from Trento to Brixen in South Tyrol. In preparation for the activation of the 33rd Infantry Division "Acqui" in Meran the 18th Infantry Regiment "Acqui" in Brixen and the 231st Infantry Regiment "Avellino" in Meran switched names and personnel on 15 December 1938. In August 1939 the XI Infantry Brigade "Brennero" was disbanded and the two infantry regiments "Avellino" were renamed "Brennero" and came under direct command of the division.

=== World War II ===
At the outbreak of World War II the regiment consisted of a command, a command company, three fusilier battalions, a support weapons battery equipped with 65/17 infantry support guns, and a mortar company equipped with 81mm Mod. 35 mortars. In June 1940 the 11th Infantry Division "Brennero" participated in the invasion of France and on 30 December 1940 the division reached the front in the Greco-Italian War. For its conduct during this war the 231st Infantry Regiment "Brennero" was awarded a Bronze Medal of Military Valor, while the 232nd Infantry Regiment "Brennero" was awarded a Silver Medal of Military Valor.

After the war the Brennero division was tasked with counter-insurgency and police duties in Athens, while 231st Infantry Regiment "Brennero" remained in Albania, where it was assigned to the 41st Infantry Division "Firenze" for anti-partisan duties. As replacement the regimental depot of the 231st Infantry Regiment "Brennero" in Brixen formed on 1 November 1941 the 331st Infantry Regiment "Brennero". In early 1942 the 331st Infantry Regiment "Brennero" arrived in Athens, but on 24 October 1942 the regiment moved to Rhodes, where it joined the 50th Infantry Division "Regina".

In February 1943 the Brennero returned to Albania to convert to a motorized division. After the announcement of the Armistice of Cassibile on 8 September 1943 the regiment dissolved chaotically: the I Battalion of the 231st Infantry Regiment "Brennero" joined the 41st Infantry Division "Firenze", with which it fought against German forces, while the III Battalion of the 231st Infantry Regiment "Brennero" sailed to Korfu, where its men were taken prisoner by the Germans.

=== Cold War ===
On 1 October 1949 the regimental command of the 75th Infantry Regiment "Napoli" in Naples became the Army Troops Command of the Security Corps of the Italian administered Trust Territory of Somaliland. On 1 January 1950 the 231st Infantry Regiment "Avellino" was reformed in Naples with the battalions and the regimental depot of the departed 75th Infantry Regiment "Napoli". After its formation the 231st Infantry Regiment "Avellino" joined the Infantry Division "Avellino" as replacement for the 75th Infantry Regiment "Napoli".

In 1960 the division was reduced to the Infantry Brigade "Avellino". On 1 October 1965 the brigade was disbanded, followed on 20 October 1965 by the 231st Infantry Regiment "Avellino", which transferred its flag to the Shrine of the Flags in the Vittoriano in Rome.

During the 1975 army reform the army disbanded the regimental level and newly independent battalions were granted for the first time their own flags. On 1 November 1975 the I Armored Troops Recruits Training Battalion in Avellino was renamed 231st Infantry Battalion "Avellino" and assigned the flag and traditions of the 231st Infantry Regiment "Avellino". The battalion was assigned to the Motorized Brigade "Pinerolo" as the brigade's recruits training battalion. The battalion consisted of a command, a command platoon, and three recruits companies. In 1987 the command platoon was increased to command and services company.

=== Recent times ===
On 16 September 1991 the 231st Infantry Battalion "Avellino" lost its autonomy and the next day the battalion entered the reformed 231st Infantry Regiment "Avellino", which on 31 December 1992 was renamed 231st Regiment "Avellino".

The regiment was disbanded on 28 September 2004 and once again the flag of the regiment was transferred to the Shrine of the Flags in the Vittoriano in Rome.
