= 3rd Anti-aircraft Artillery Regiment "Firenze" =

Inactive Italian Army air defense unit

- 3° Reggimento Artiglieria Controaerei "Firenze"
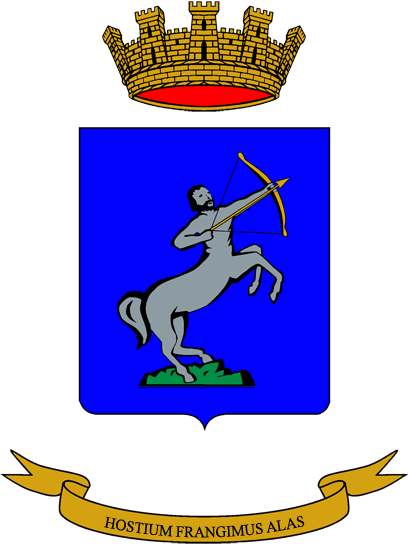
- Regimental coat of arms
- Active: 1 June 1930 — 8 Sept. 1943; 1 May 1947 — 1 Sept. 1961; 14 Sept. 1992 — 1 Nov. 2001
- Country: Italy
- Branch: Italian Army
- Garrison/HQ: Rovigo
- Motto(s): "Hostium frangimus alas"
- Anniversaries: 15 June 1918 - Second Battle of the Piave River

Insignia
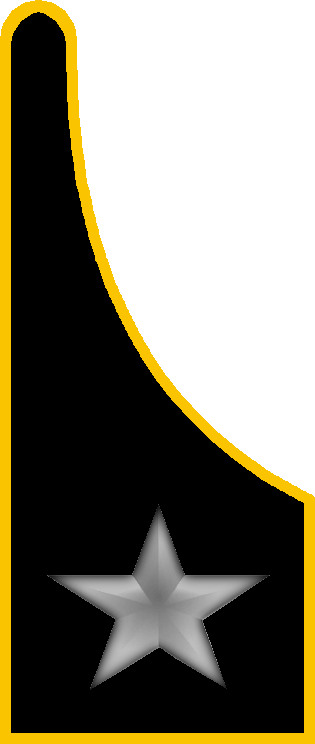
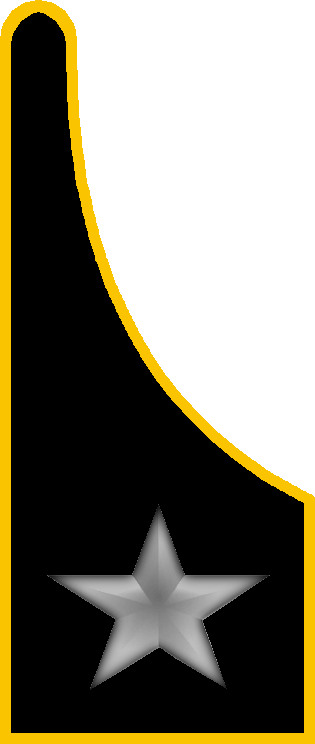
- Regimental gorget patches

The 3rd Anti-aircraft Artillery Regiment "Firenze" (Italian: 3° Reggimento Artiglieria Controaerei "Firenze") is an inactive air defense regiment of the Italian Army, which was based in Rovigo in Veneto. Originally an air defense regiment of the Royal Italian Army, the unit was last active from 1992 to 2001. The regiment's anniversary falls, as for all Italian Army artillery regiments, on June 15, the beginning of the Second Battle of the Piave River in 1918.

== History ==
=== Interwar years ===
On 25 November 1926, the 7th Anti-aircraft Artillery Center was formed in Florence, with elements of the disbanded 9th Heavy Artillery Regiment and 14th Heavy Field Artillery Regiment. On 1 January 1927, the center consisted of a command, a trucked group with 75/27 C.K. anti-aircraft guns, a photo-electricians unit, and a depot. The photo-electricians unit operated searchlights. On 6 May 1927, the regiment completed its organization with a positional group with 76/45 anti-aircraft guns.

On 1 April 1930, the positional group was transferred to the 5th Anti-aircraft Artillery Center, while the 1st Anti-aircraft Artillery Center ceded its trucked group with 75/27 C.K. anti-aircraft guns and its photo-electricians unit to the 7th Anti-aircraft Artillery Center. On 1 June of the same year, the center changed its name to 3rd Trucked Anti-aircraft Artillery Regiment. In April 1931, the two photo-electricians units were disbanded and both of the regiment's trucked groups formed a photo-electricians section and an acoustic locator squad with the personnel of the two disbanded units.

On 1 January 1934, the regiment changed its name to 3rd Anti-aircraft Artillery Regiment. In preparation for the Second Italo-Ethiopian War the regiment formed two special batteries equipped with 75/27 C.K. anti-aircraft guns, one of which was sent on 25 June 1935 to Italian Eritrea, while the other was sent on 5 July 1935 to Italian Somalia. On 4 September 1935, the regiment was mobilized for the war and deployed to the city of Catania in Sicily. In 1936, the regiment formed the 254th and 255th positional batteries, which were transferred to Italian Libya, where they joined the 2nd Colonial Artillery Regiment. From January to September 1936, the 3rd Battery of the regiment's I Trucked Group was deployed to the Italian Islands of the Aegean. On 7 July 1936, the regiment was demobilized.

=== World War II ===
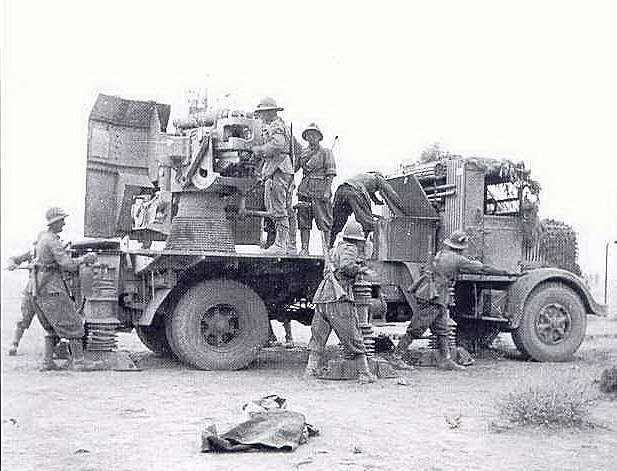
Lancia 3Ro truck with 90/53 anti-aircraft gun

At the outbreak of World War II the regiment consisted of a command, a command unit, and the V Positional Group with 75/27 C.K. anti-aircraft guns. Initially the V Group was in Lazio, before serving in occupied Albania from April to September 1941. In January 1943, the V Group was sent to Corsica and in September of the same year from there to Sardinia.

During the war the regiment's depot in Florence mobilized the following units:

- XXXV Trucked Group with 75/46 mod. 34 anti-aircraft guns
- XL Trucked Group with 75/46 mod. 34 anti-aircraft guns
- LXXVII Trucked Group with 75/46 mod. 34 anti-aircraft guns
- DIII Trucked Group with 90/53 anti-aircraft guns on Lancia 3Ro trucks for the 133rd Armored Division "Littorio"
- DVIII Trucked Group with 90/53 anti-aircraft guns on Breda 52 trucks
- DXI Trucked Group with 90/53 anti-aircraft guns on Breda 52 trucks
- XVIII Positional Group with 8.8cm Flak anti-aircraft guns
- XXIX Positional Group with 8.8cm Flak anti-aircraft guns
- XLV Positional Group with 75mm mod. 13-17 anti-aircraft guns
- LXI Positional Group with 76/40 mod. 16 anti-aircraft guns
- LI Positional Group with 20/70 autocannons
- CLIII Positional Group with 20/70 autocannons
- DII Positional Group with 20/70 autocannons, the group was used to protect naval transports
- CXXIX Positional Group with 2cm Flak autocannons
- CXXX Positional Group with 2cm Flak autocannons
- CXXXI Positional Group with 2cm Flak autocannons

The depot also mobilized the command of the 3rd Anti-aircraft Artillery Grouping, which incorporated the XXXV Trucked Group with 75/46 mod. 34 anti-aircraft guns and XL Trucked Group with 75/46 mod. 34 anti-aircraft guns, as well as the DIV Trucked Group with 90/53 anti-aircraft guns of the 1st Anti-aircraft Artillery Regiment and the DV Trucked Group with 90/53 anti-aircraft guns of the 2nd Anti-aircraft Artillery Regiment. Initially the grouping was stationed in Sicily, but in January 1943 it was transferred with the XXXV and DIV groups to North Africa for the Tunisian campaign. The 3rd Anti-aircraft Artillery Grouping and its units were declared lost after Axis forces in Tunisia surrendered on 13 May 1943.

The DV Trucked Group remained in Sicily in the area of Porto Empedocle until it had to retreat to mainland Italy after the allied forces landed in Sicily. In the evening of 8 September 1943, the Armistice of Cassibile, which ended hostilities between the Kingdom of Italy and the Anglo-American Allies, was announced by General Dwight D. Eisenhower on Radio Algiers and by Marshal Pietro Badoglio on Italian radio. Germany reacted by invading Italy and the 3rd Anti-aircraft Artillery Regiment and its depot were disbanded by German forces soon thereafter.

=== Cold War ===
On 1 May 1947, the Italian Army reformed the regiment as 3rd Light Anti-aircraft Artillery Regiment in Meran with the personnel and materiel of the VI Anti-aircraft Group and VI/bis Anti-aircraft Group ceded by the 35th Field Artillery Regiment. The regiment was assigned to the Infantry Division "Friuli" and consisted of a command, a command unit, the I Group with 40/56 autocannons, and the II Group with 40/56 autocannons. The following year the regiment moved from Meran to Pisa.

On 1 January 1951, the Infantry Division "Friuli" included the following artillery regiments:

- Infantry Division "Friuli", in Florence
  - 8th Field Artillery Regiment, in Livorno
  - 9th Anti-tank Field Artillery Regiment, in Lucca
  - 35th Field Artillery Regiment, in Rimini
  - 3rd Light Anti-aircraft Artillery Regiment, in Pisa

On 1 July 1951, the 3rd Light Anti-aircraft Artillery Regiment was reorganized as 3rd Heavy Anti-aircraft Artillery Regiment and received the CV Group with 90/50 M1 anti-aircraft guns from the Anti-aircraft Artillery School. In January 1952, the regiment added a second group with 90/50 anti-aircraft guns. On 1 September 1961, the regiment was disbanded and its personnel used to reform the 3rd Heavy Field Artillery Regiment. Afterwards the flag of the 3rd Anti-aircraft Artillery Regiment was transferred to the Shrine of the Flags in the Vittoriano in Rome for safekeeping.

=== Recent times ===
On 13 September 1992, the 5th Anti-aircraft Missile Artillery Regiment in Mestre was disbanded and the next day reformed in San Donà di Piave as 5th Anti-aircraft Artillery Regiment by reorganizing the regiment's 1st Missile Group. On the same day, 14 September 1992, the regiment's 2nd Missile Group in Rovigo was reorganized and then incorporated by the reformed 3rd Anti-aircraft Artillery Regiment. The reformed regiment operated MIM-23 Hawk surface-to-air missiles. On 1 October 1997, the regiment was given then name "Firenze" to commemorate the city of its founding.

On 31 October 2001, the missile group of the 5th Anti-aircraft Artillery Regiment "Pescara" in San Donà di Piave was disbanded, while the flag of the 3rd Anti-aircraft Artillery Regiment "Firenze" was transferred once more to the Shrine of the Flags in the Vittoriano in Rome. The next day, on 1 November 2001, the flag of the 5th Anti-aircraft Artillery Regiment "Pescara" arrived Rovigo, where it took over the base and missile group of the disbanded regiment.
