= Monte Campomolon =

Mountain in Italy

- Location within Italy

Highest point
- Elevation: 1,853 m (6,079 ft)
- Coordinates: 45°52′27″N 11°17′03″E

Geography
- Location: Veneto, Italy

Monte Campomolon is a mountain of the Veneto, Italy. It has an elevation of 1,853 metres (6,079 ft).

The mountain was the sight of fighting during World War I. The remains of an unfinished fortress (Forte Campomolon), from 1915, are located on its top.
