= Monte San Michele =

Hill in Italy

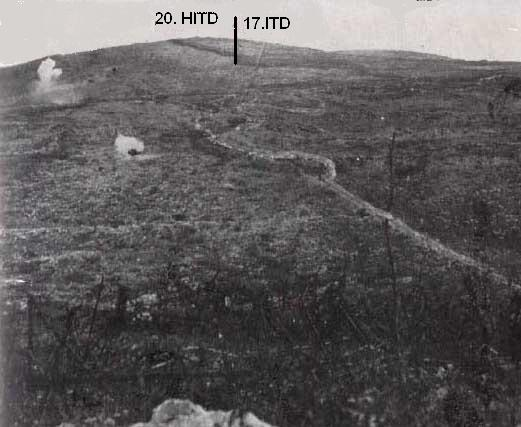
- The San Michele in a World War I photograph

Highest point
- Elevation: 275 m (902 ft)
- Coordinates: 45°53′09″N 13°32′49″E

Geography
- Location: Friuli-Venezia Giulia, Italy
- Parent range: Karst Plateau

Monte San Michele (Slovene: Debela griža) is a hill on the Karst Plateau, in the Italian province of Gorizia, on the border between the municipalities of Sagrado (Zagraj) and Savogna d'Isonzo (Sovodnje ob Soči). It is located eight kilometres southwest of Gorizia, on the left bank of the Isonzo, and has four peaks, the highest two of which (Cima Due and Cima Tre) have an elevation of 275 meters above sea level, while the lowest (Cima Uno) has an elevation of 271 meters, and Cima Quattro stands at 264 meters.

Due to its commanding position over the lower Isonzo valley and the plain of Gorizia, it was the theatre of heavy fighting during the First World War; along with Sabotin and Podgora, the San Michele was one of the main bulwarks of the Austro-Hungarian defense of Gorizia during the early battles of the Isonzo, heavily fortified with multiple trenches, barbed wire, heavy artillery, tunnels and machine-gun posts. It was one of the most bitterly contested heights on the Karst during the first six battles of the Isonzo; during the second battle of the Isonzo, in July 1915, it was twice captured by Italian troops, and twice recaptured by Austro-Hungarian counterattacks. Partial gains were made during the third and fourth battle of Isonzo.

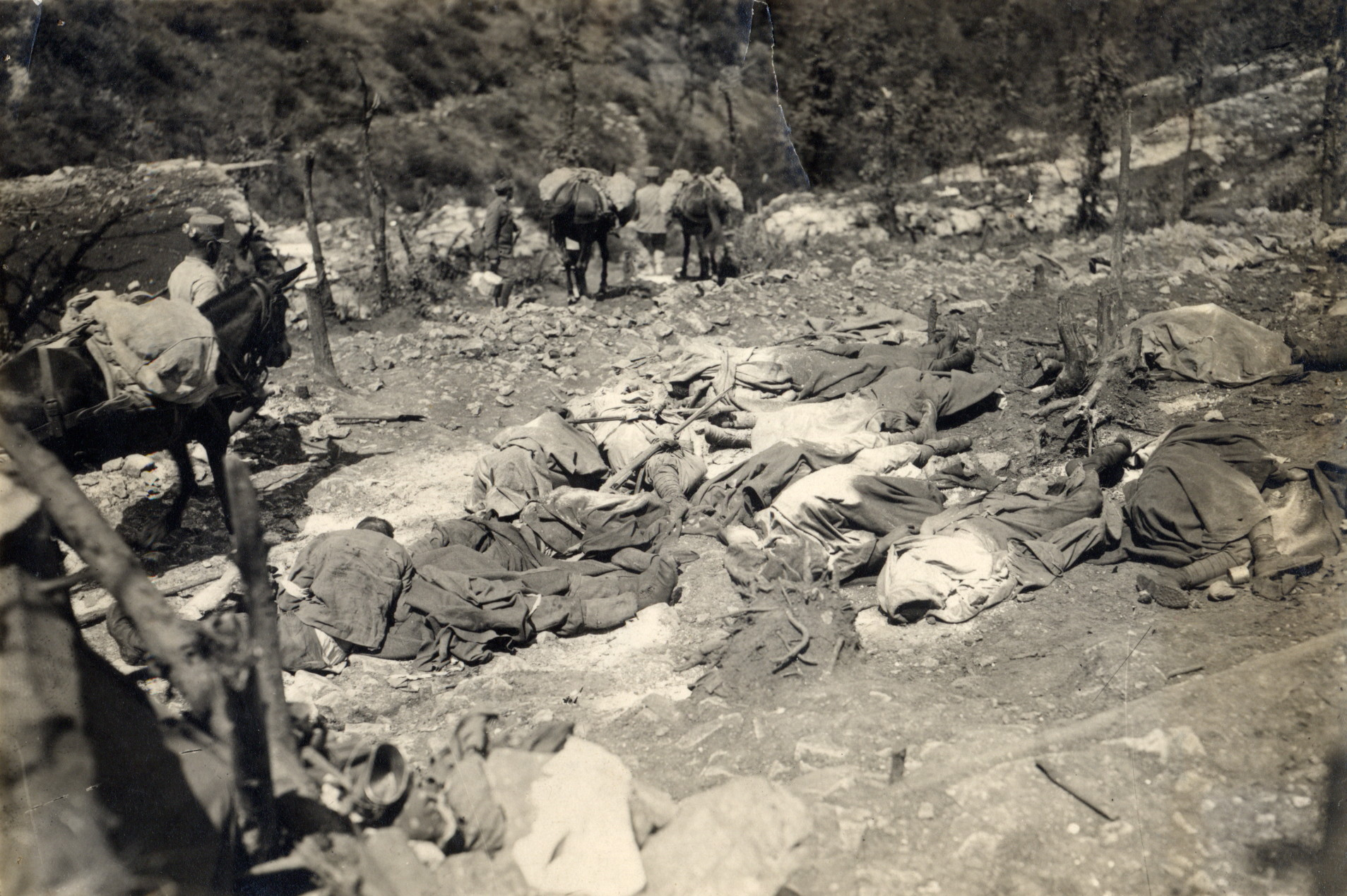
Italian casualties after the 29 June 1916 gas attack on Monte San Michele

On 29 June 1916 the San Michele was the location of the first use of poison gas on the Italian Front, when the Austro-Hungarian released a mix of chlorine and phosgene which killed 2,700 Italian troops and poisoned another 4,000 (additionally, some 250 Austro-Hungarians were killed, and 1,500 poisoned, due to a change in the wind that blew some of the gas back towards the Austro-Hungarian lines). The San Michele was finally secured by the Italian XI Corps (General Giorgio Cigliana) in August 1916, during the sixth battle of Isonzo.

Poet Giuseppe Ungaretti fought on the San Michele, which he mentioned in some of the poems collected in Allegria di naufragi.

In 1922 the San Michele was declared a "monumental area", and turned into an open-air museum. A World War I museum is located near Cima Tre.

Monte San Michele circa 1915 taken from Monte Fortin.
