= 11th Infantry Division "Brennero" =

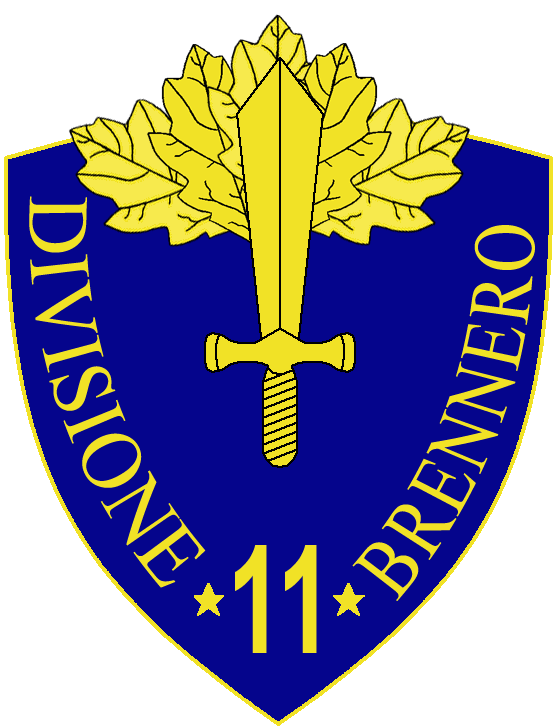
- 11th Infantry Division "Brennero" insignia
- Active: 1939–1945
- Country: Kingdom of Italy
- Branch: Royal Italian Army
- Type: Infantry
- Size: Division
- Garrison/HQ: Bolzano
- Engagements: World War II

Insignia
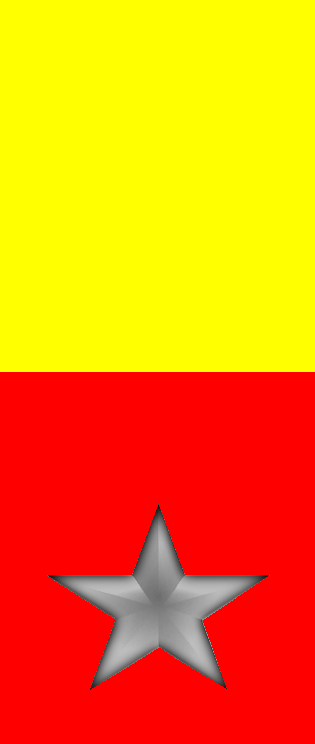
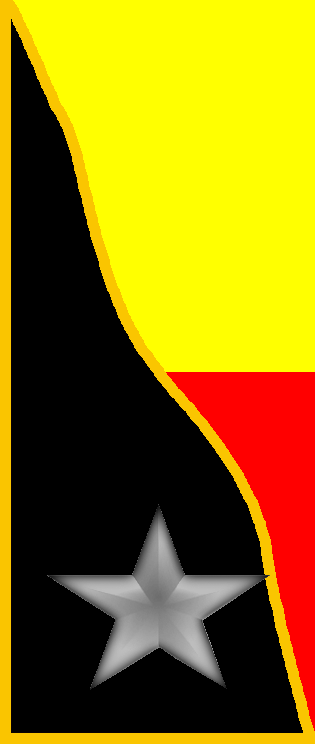
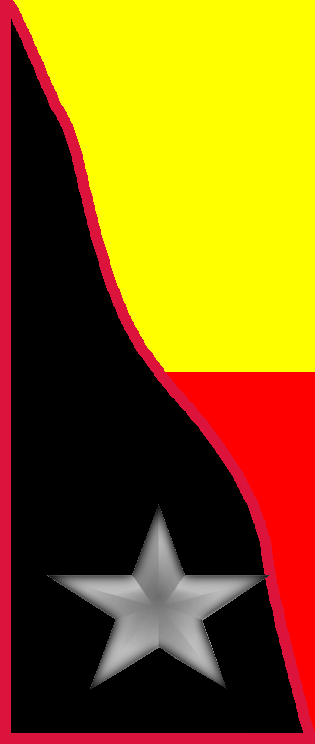
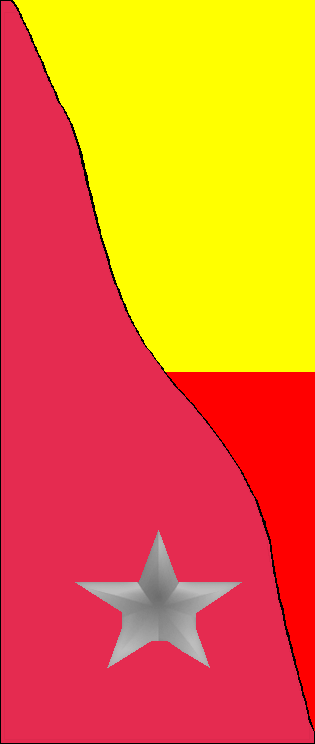
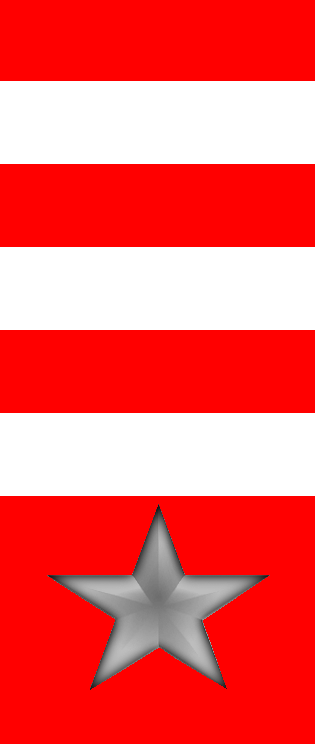
- Identification symbol: Brennero Division gorget patches

The 11th Infantry Division "Brennero" (Italian: 11ª Divisione di fanteria "Brennero") was a infantry division of the Royal Italian Army during World War II. The Brennero was a mountain-type infantry division, which meant that the division's artillery and logistics were moved by pack mules, while in standard infantry divisions artillery and logistics were moved by horse-drawn limbers and carriages. Italy's real mountain warfare divisions were the six alpine divisions composed of Alpini troops. The Brennero was named for the Brenner Pass between Italy and Austria. The division was based in the western half of South Tyrol with the division's headquarter in Bolzano.

== History ==
=== World War I ===
The division's lineage begins with the Brigade "Avellino" established during World War I in Camposampiero on 26 May 1916. The brigade consisted of the 231st Infantry Regiment and 232nd Infantry Regiments. The brigade fought on the Italian front and for their conduct the brigade's two infantry regiments were awarded Italy's highest military honor, the Gold Medal of Military Valor. After the war regiments raised during the war were dissolved, with the exception of those, who had been awarded a Gold Medal of Military Valor.

On 15 October 1926 the brigade assumed the name of XI Infantry Brigade and received the 18th Infantry Regiment "Acqui" from the disbanded Brigade "Acqui". The brigade was the infantry component of the 11th Territorial Division of Bolzano, which also included the 9th Artillery Regiment. In 1934 the division changed its name to 11th Infantry Division "Brennero". On 15 December 1938 in preparation for the activation of the 33rd Infantry Division "Acqui" the 18th Infantry Regiment "Acqui" in Brixen and the 231st Infantry Regiment "Avellino" in Meran switched names and personnel. In August 1939 the division ceded the 18th Infantry Regiment "Acqui" to the newly activated 33rd Infantry Division "Acqui" in Meran. At the same time the XI Infantry Brigade was dissolved and the two remaining infantry regiments came under direct command of the division, with both regiments being renamed "Brennero". The 9th Artillery Regiment was also given the division's name.

=== World War II ===
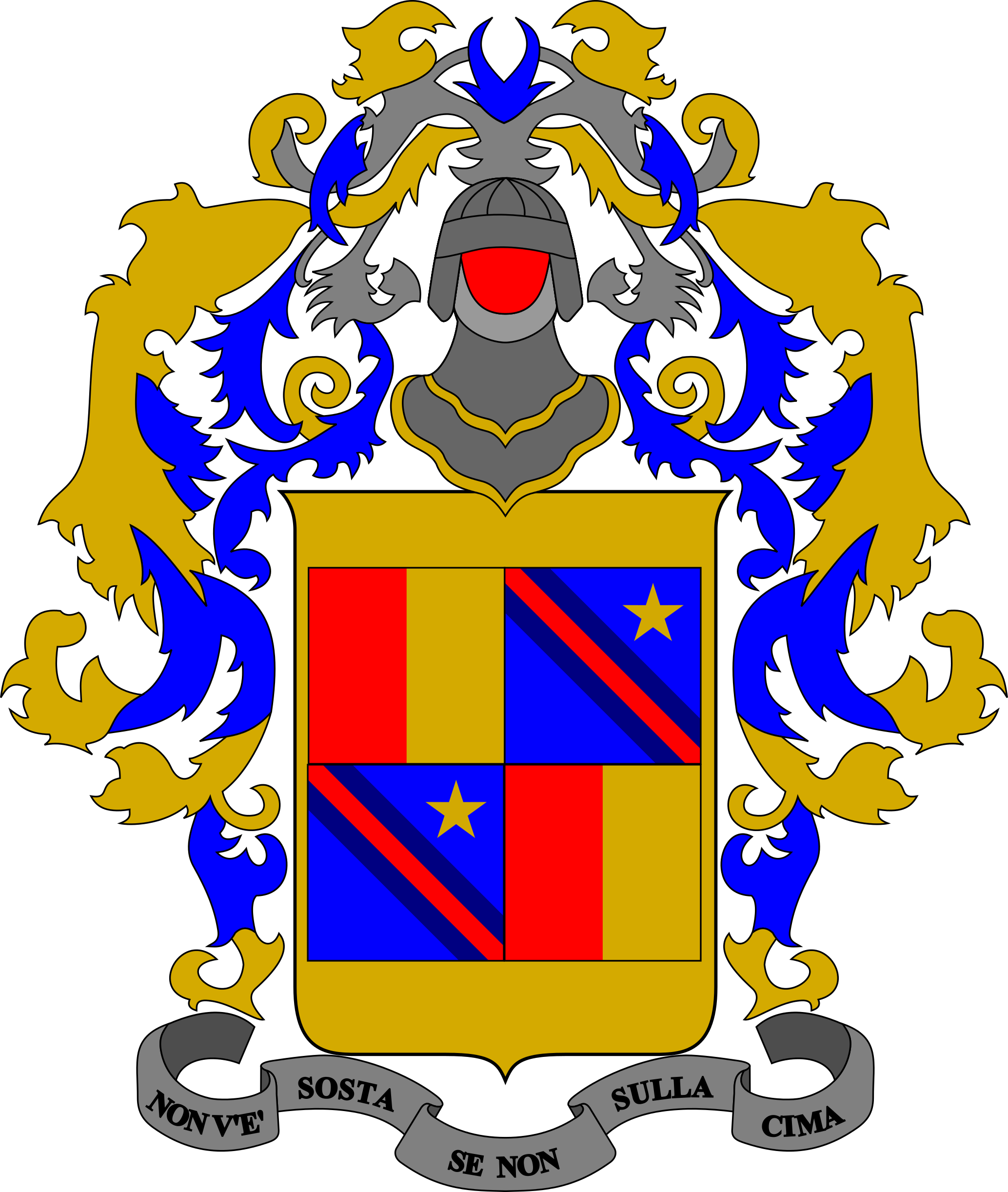
Coat of Arms of the 232nd Infantry Regiment "Avellino", 1939

==== Invasion of France ====
On 4 January 1940, the Brennero division was transferred to Pianezza and San Maurizio Canavese region. On 10 June 1940 it was at the border with France as reserve unit of I Army Corps. Some the division's units participated in the invasion of France and entered the front on 19 June 1940 at Mont Cenis. Repeated attacks on the mountain pass of Mont Cenis were not successful until 22 June 1940. The French defence was broken on 24 June 1940, with the Brennero's troops capturing Lanslevillard and Lanslebourg-Mont-Cenis. The total loss of life for Brennero was 18 men killed and 74 wounded, with half of the deaths attributed to exposure to the elements.

==== Greco-Italian War ====
During the Greco-Italian War the Brennero was sent as reinforcement to Albania arriving on 24 December 1940 in Vlorë. The division was part of to XXV Army Corps. The division assembled in Tepelenë by 8 January 1941, with its first units entering the front already on 31 December in Kurvelesh. On 10 January 1941, the Brennero was used to reinforce the remnants of the 37th Infantry Division "Modena" near Salari. On 9–12 February 1941 Brennero helped to defeat a Greek attack on Tepelenë, with about two-thirds of the division becoming casualties in the fierce fighting. From 7–23 April 1941, the Brennero attacked in the area of Kurvelesh and broke through Greek lines after 4 days of fighting.

==== Greece ====
After the war had ended the division moved to Greece, where it was assigned to the III Army Corps and tasked with counter-insurgency and police duties in Athens. The division's 231st Infantry Regiment "Brennero" remained in Albania and was assigned to the 41st Infantry Division "Firenze" for anti-partisan duties. In early 1942 the newly raised 331st Infantry Regiment "Brennero" arrived as replacement for the 231st "Brennero". However, on 24 October 1942 the 331st "Brennero" was transferred to the 50th Infantry Division "Regina" and moved to Rhodes.

==== Albania ====
On 25 July 1942, the division was ordered to begin conversion to an auto-transportable infantry division of the North-African-type. However the Axis defeat in November 1942 at the Second Battle of Al Alamein precluded a deployment to the division to North African theater and so the division was ordered in February 1943 to move to Durrës in Albania and convert to a motorized division. While in Albania the division was subordinated to IV Army Corps. After the Armistice of Cassibile was announced on 8 September 1943 the division dissolved chaotically: some troops and the division's commander joined the Germans, while other troops abandoned their heavy equipment and embarked on ships for allied-controlled southern Italy. The I Battalion/ 231st Infantry Regiment "Brennero" joined the 41st Infantry Division "Firenze", which fought with Albanian partisans against German forces, while the III Battalion/ 231st Infantry Regiment "Brennero" in Sarandë sailed to Korfu, where its men were taken prisoner by the Germans.

== Organization ==
=== 11th Infantry Division "Brennero" ===
11th Infantry Division "Brennero" organization in 1940

- 11th Infantry Division "Brennero", in Bolzano
  - Headquarters
    - Command Company
    - 28th Carabinieri Section
    - 29th Carabinieri Section
    - 61st Field Post Office
    - 11th Infantry Division Command Transport Squad
  - 231st Infantry Regiment "Brennero", (Note: Named 231st Infantry Regiment "Avellino" until 1939 when the army reorganized its divisions as binary divisions and divisional infantry regiments took the name of the division.) in Brixen
    - Command Company
    - 3 × Fusilier battalions
    - Support Weapons Battery (65/17 mod. 13 infantry support guns)
    - Mortar Company (81mm mod. 35 mortars)
  - 232nd Infantry Regiment "Brennero", (Note: Named 232nd Infantry Regiment "Avellino" until 1939 when the army reorganized its divisions as binary divisions and divisional infantry regiments took the name of the division.) in Bolzano
    - Command Company
    - 3 × Fusilier battalions
    - Support Weapons Battery (65/17 mod. 13 infantry support guns)
    - Mortar Company (81mm mod. 35 mortars)
  - 331st Infantry Regiment "Brennero" (raised on 1 November 1941, transferred to Rhodes and joined the 50th Infantry Division "Regina" on 24 October 1942, dissolved on 11 September 1943)
    - Command Company
    - 3 × Fusilier battalions
    - Cannons Company (47/32 mod. 35 anti-tank guns)
    - Mortar Company (81mm mod. 35 mortars)
  - 9th Artillery Regiment "Brennero", in Bolzano
    - Command Unit
    - I Group (100/17 mod. 14 howitzers; left the regiment on 1 November 1942)
    - II Group (75/13 mod. 15 mountain guns; left the regiment on 1 November 1942)
    - III Group (75/13 mod. 15 mountain guns; left the regiment on 1 November 1942)
    - 205th Anti-aircraft Battery (20/65 mod. 35 anti-aircraft guns)
    - 211th Anti-aircraft Battery (20/65 mod. 35 anti-aircraft guns)
    - Ammunition and Supply Unit
  - XI Mortar Battalion (81mm mod. 35 mortars; transferred to the LI Special Brigade "Lecce")
  - 11th Anti-tank Company (47/32 mod. 35 anti-tank guns)
  - 11th Telegraph and Radio Operators Company
  - 32nd Engineer Company
  - 22nd Medical Section
    - 4 × Field hospitals
    - 1 × Surgical Unit
  - 11th Autocarrette Section
  - 19th Supply Section
  - 139th Transport Section

Attached during the invasion of France in 1940:

- XL CC.NN. Battalion

Attached from 14 November 1940 until April 1942:

- 45th CC.NN. Legion "Alto Adige"
  - Command Company
  - XXV CC.NN. Battalion
  - XLV CC.NN. Battalion
  - 45th CC.NN. Machine Gun Company

The XXV CC.NN. Battalion remained with the division even after the 45th CC.NN. Legion "Alto Adige" had returned to Italy.

=== 11th Motorized Division "Brennero" ===
11th Motorized Division "Brennero" organization in September 1943

On 8 September 1943, the day the Armistice of Cassibile between the allies and Italy was announced, 11th Infantry Division "Brennero" was still in the process of being reorganized as a motorized division and had the following organization.

- 11th Infantry Division "Brennero"
  - Headquarters
    - Command Company
    - 28th Carabinieri Section
    - 61st Field Post Office
    - 11th Motorized Division Command Transport Squad
  - 231st Motorized Infantry Regiment "Brennero"
    - Command Company
    - 2 × Fusilier battalions
    - Support Weapons Battalion
    - Mortar Company (81mm mod. 35 mortars)
  - 232nd Motorized Infantry Regiment "Brennero"
    - Command Company
    - 2 × Fusilier battalions
    - Support Weapons Battalion
    - Mortar Company (81mm mod. 35 mortars)
  - 9th Artillery Regiment "Brennero", in Durrës
    - Command Unit
    - I Group (75/27 mod. 06 field guns; joined the regiment in December 1942)
    - II Group (75/32 mod. 37 field guns; joined the regiment in December 1942)
    - III Group (75/32 mod. 37 field guns; joined the regiment in January 1943)
    - XLVII Anti-aircraft Group (75/46 C.A. mod. 34 anti-aircraft guns; formed by the 2nd Anti-aircraft Artillery Regiment, joined the regiment in November 1942; transferred to the 9th Army Corps Artillery Grouping in September 1943)
    - DLVIII Self-propelled Group (Semovente da 75/18 (on M14/41 chassis) self-propelled guns; formed by the 9th Army Corps Artillery Regiment, joined the regiment in November 1942; transferred to the 9th Army Corps Artillery Grouping in September 1943)
    - Ammunition and Supply Unit
  - CXXXII Self-propelled Anti-tank Battalion (Semovente da 47/32 self-propelled guns)
  - CXI Mixed Engineer Battalion
  - 22nd Medical Section
    - 4 × Field hospitals
    - 1 × Surgical Unit
  - 19th Supply Section
  - 99th Transport Section

Attached units in 1943:

- 9th Army Corps Artillery Grouping (attached in September 1943)
  - Command Unit
  - XXXIII Group (105/28 cannons)
  - XLVI Group (105/28 cannons)
  - XLVII Anti-aircraft Group (75/46 C.A. mod. 34 anti-aircraft guns)
  - DLVIII Self-propelled Group (Semovente da 75/18 (on M14/41 chassis) self-propelled guns)
  - 311th Anti-aircraft Battery (20/65 mod. 35 anti-aircraft guns)
  - 348th Anti-aircraft Battery (20/65 mod. 35 anti-aircraft guns)
- XXV CC.NN. Battalion
- XXVI Machine Gun Battalion
- CDLXXIX Coastal Infantry Battalion

== Commanding officers ==
The division's commanding officers were:

- Generale di Divisione Emilio Bancale (1 April 1938 – 1 September 1939)
- Generale di Divisione Arnaldo Forgiero (1 September 1939 - 20 October 1940)
- Generale di Divisione Paolo Berardi (21 October 1940 - 30 September 1941)
- Generale di Divisione Licurgo Zannini (1 October 1941 - 10 February 1942)
- Generale di Divisione Mario Marghinotti (11 February 1942 - 19 December 1942)
- Generale di Brigata Aldo Princivalle (20 December 1942 - 8 September 1943)
