= Sabotin =

Mountain ridge on the border between Slovenia and Italy

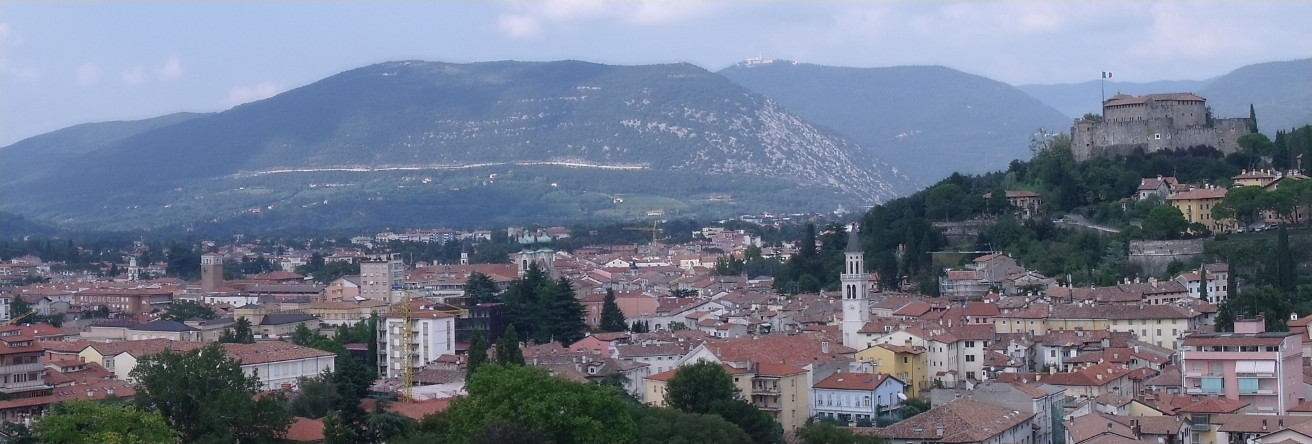
- Sabotin, view from Gorizia

Highest point
- Elevation: 609 m (1,998 ft)
- Coordinates: 45°59′18.29″N 13°38′5.21″E

Geography
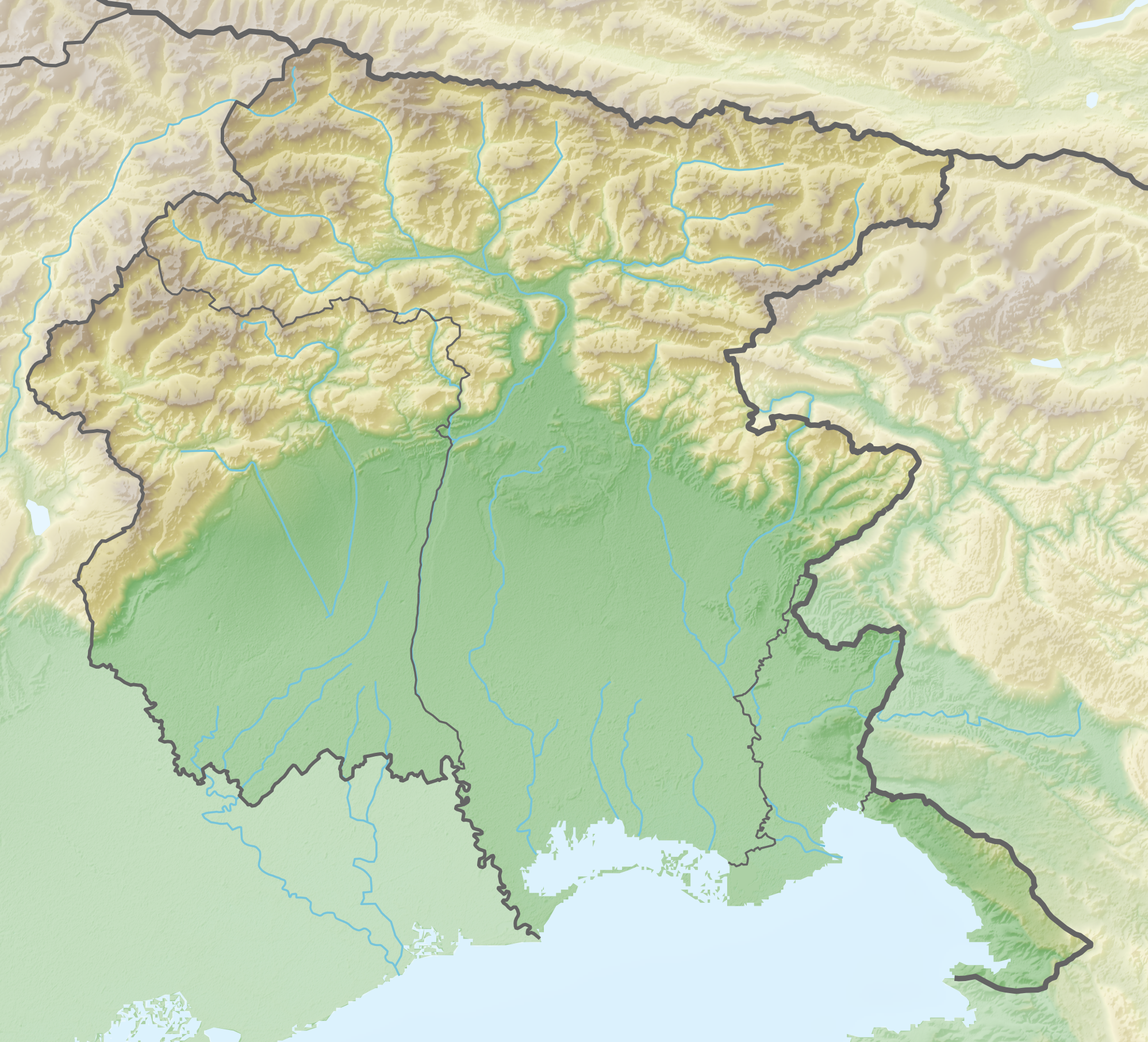
- Location within Alps Location within Friuli-Venezia Giulia Location within Italy Location within Slovenia
- Location: Slovenia - Italy
- Parent range: Alps

Sabotin (Italian: Sabotino, Friulian: Mont di San Valantin) is 609-metre-high (1,998 ft) mountain ridge overlooking Gorizia, Nova Gorica, and Solkan on the border between Slovenia and Italy. At its foot stands the Solkan Bridge spanning the Soča River.

== Name ==
The mountain was first attested in written sources circa 1370 as Saluatin. The name is of unclear origin. Based on the oldest attestations of the name, it can be derived from *Salbotin, based on the Latin personal name Salvus (literally, 'healthy'). Another possibility (assuming that the old attestations are wrong) is that the name was originally Sabotin, based on the Italian name Sàb(b)ato, originally given to a child born on a Saturday. A third possibility is that it is derived from *San Valentin (there is a church dedicated to Saint Valentine on the mountain) through a number of unexpected phonological changes.

== History ==
Sabotin represented an important point for defending Gorizia during the Soča/Isonzo offensives. It was defended by the Austro-Hungarian 58th division. Pietro Badoglio assigned general Giuseppe Venturi's 45th division to capture Sabotin in the Sixth Battle of the Isonzo. On 6 August 1916, after a brief and bloody battle, the mountain was captured by the Italians.
