= Battle of Gorizia (1916) =

World War I battle between armies of the Kingdom of Italy and Austria-Hungary

Coordinates: 45.9330°N 13.6160°E

Sixth Battle of the Isonzo
- Part of the Italian Front of the First World War
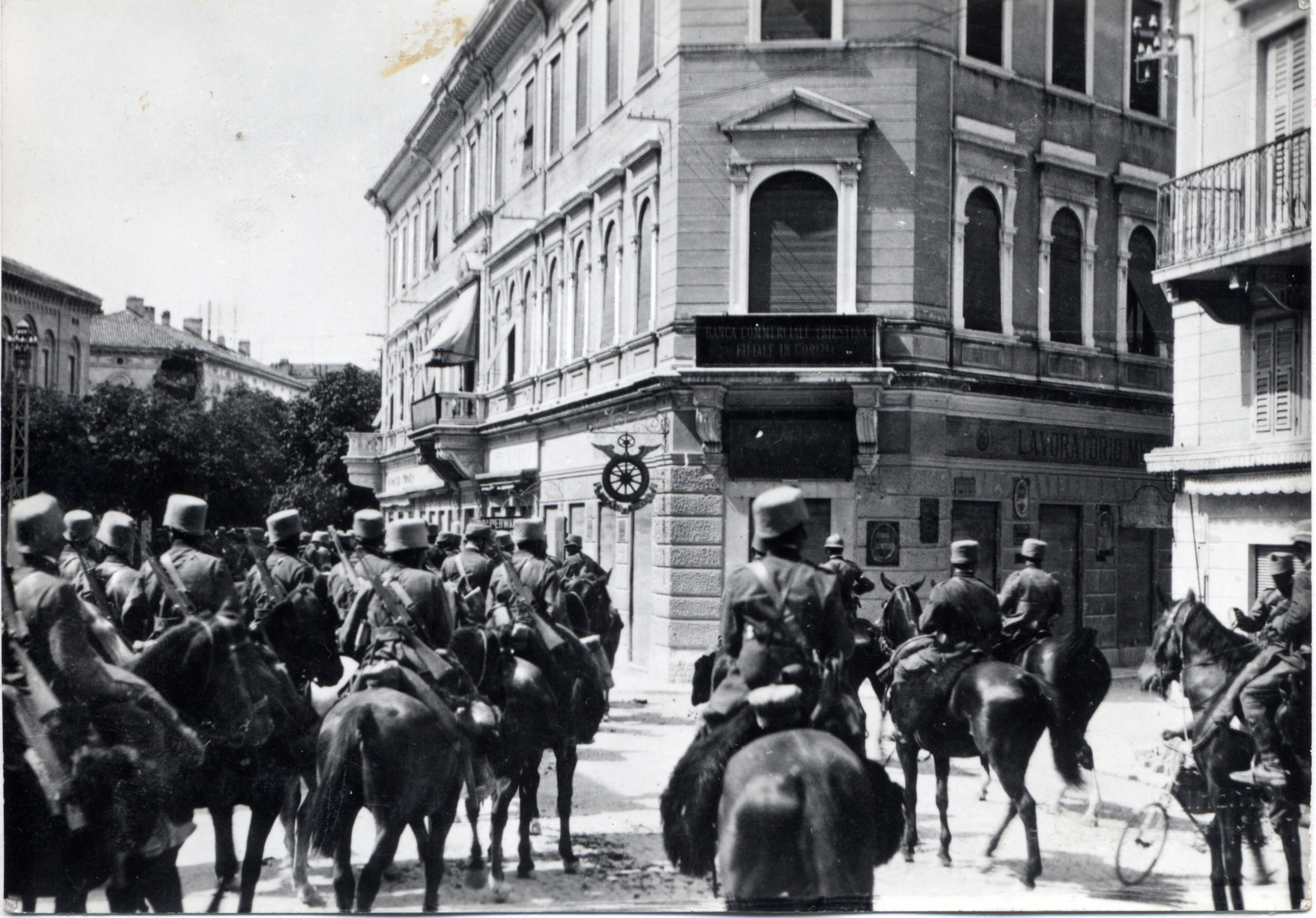
- 9 August 1916 Italian cavalry enters Gorizia
Date	4–16 August 1916
Location	Isonzo, Gorizia and Karst Plateau
Result	Italian victory
Territorial changes	Capture of Gorizia, Sabotino, Oslavia-Podgora and San Michele

Belligerents
Italy	Austria-Hungary

Commanders and leaders
(Kingdom of Italy) Luigi Cadorna; (Kingdom of Italy) Luigi Capello; (Kingdom of Italy) Prince Emanuele Filiberto	(Austria-Hungary) Conrad von Hötzendorf; (Austria-Hungary) Svetozar Boroević

Strength
203 battalions	106 battalions

Casualties and losses
51,221 (Note: Detailed as 6,310 killed, 32,784 wounded and 12,127 missing): 6,310 killed; 32,784 wounded; 12,127 missing	37,458 (Note: Detailed as 3,719 killed, 19,910 wounded and 13,829 missing): 3,719 killed; 19,910 wounded; 13,829 missing

The Sixth Battle of the Isonzo, better known as the Battle of Gorizia, was the most successful Italian offensive along the Soča (Isonzo) River during World War I.

== Background ==
Franz Conrad von Hötzendorf had reduced the Austro-Hungarian forces along the Soča front to reinforce his Trentino Offensive and also to assist with the defense of the Russian Brusilov Offensive taking place on the Eastern front. Italian Chief-of-Staff Luigi Cadorna, along with Prince Emanuele Filiberto, Duke of Aosta – Commander of the Italian Third Army, turned his attention to the Isonzo front and particularly, the city of Gorizia. They planned a heavy bombardment in a very restricted zone between Podgora Hill (Monte Calvario) and Monte San Michele – two heights overlooking the city. Bombardment would be followed by ground actions to obtain control of the left bank of the Isonzo River. Moreover, this battle would start with an advantage because Italians had already succeeded in advancing towards the top of Sabotin (Monte Sabotino), another height overlooking Soča valley and Gorizia, and Italian sappers had built several tunnels behind Austro-Hungarian positions.

Cadorna also made good use of railroads to quickly shift troops from Trentino back to the Isonzo frontline for this offensive against the weakened Austro-Hungarian defenses.

== Battle ==
On 6 August the offensive was launched against Gorizia. The attack was concentrated in two zones: the hilly area west of the Soča river near Gorizia and the westernmost edge of the Karst Plateau near Doberdò del Lago (Doberdob). Italians managed to conquer the main transport road leading from Duino to Gorizia in the Battle of Doberdò after bloody hand-to-hand combat, thus securing their advance to Gorizia from the south. Austro-Hungarian forces had to retreat on the line east of Gorizia (Mount Škabrijel), leaving the heavily damaged town to Italians.

Bombardment of Gorizia was extremely heavy and effective. Borojević unsuccessfully asked for reinforcements. In the afternoon Cadorna ordered the 45th division to attack Sabotin. Italian infantry with support of heavy artillery reached the peak in less than an hour.

Simultaneously the attack on Monte San Michele also commenced. Italian infantry successfully reached the summit while Austro-Hungarian soldiers retreated waiting for a later counterattack. In the absence of reserve forces, which had been deployed to Sabotin, that counterattack failed.

With the conquest of Sabotin and Monte San Michele, the previously strong Austro-Hungarian defensive line around Gorizia rapidly disintegrated. Later that night Italians also captured Monte Calvario. On 8 August the last Austro-Hungarian regiment from right bank of Soča River withdrew to the east. The first platoons of the Pavia Brigade began to enter the city. Gorizia fell to Cadorna and a bridgehead was finally established across the Soča River. Austro-Hungarians shifted troops to the Gorizia sector to prevent a breakthrough.

Borojević had already ordered his men to retreat further to the east into Vallone Valley north of Monfalcone (Tržič) thus abandoning strategic positions on the western Carso such as Monte Sei Busi, the zone around Doberdò del Lago and Monte Cosich to the north of Monfalcone.

Austro-Hungarian defenses in the north and east of Gorizia still included an uninterrupted series of heights – including ridges from Sveta gora (Monte Santo), Škabrijel (Monte San Gabriele), Sveti Danijel (Monte San Daniele, and Hill 383. Austro-Hungarian artillery and artillery observatories were, placed on these peaks after the fall of Gorizia. These peaks had been prepared for defense purposes to block Italian offensives towards Trieste and Vienna.

The new Austro-Hungarian front line now passed from Nad Logom (Hill 212), Hill 187 (near Devetachi, Devetaki), Opacchiasella (Opatje selo), Nova Vas (Novavilla), Hill 208, Hill 144 and Hill 77 from north to south. Austro-Hungarian troops engaged the Italians in a series of heavy defensive firefights.

With the bridgehead being established, capturing Gorizia and the western Karst, and having suffered heavy losses, Cadorna ended the offensive on 17 August.

The attack on Gorizia was the most successful Italian offensive along the Isonzo and greatly boosted Italian morale - especially since Gorizia had been promoted as a desirable objective, unattainable in earlier battles. Italy finally declared war against Germany on 28 August..

== See also ==
- Battles of the Isonzo – overview
  - Fifth Battle of the Isonzo – 9−17 March 1916
  - Seventh Battle of the Isonzo – 14–17 September 1916
