= 50th Infantry Division "Regina" =

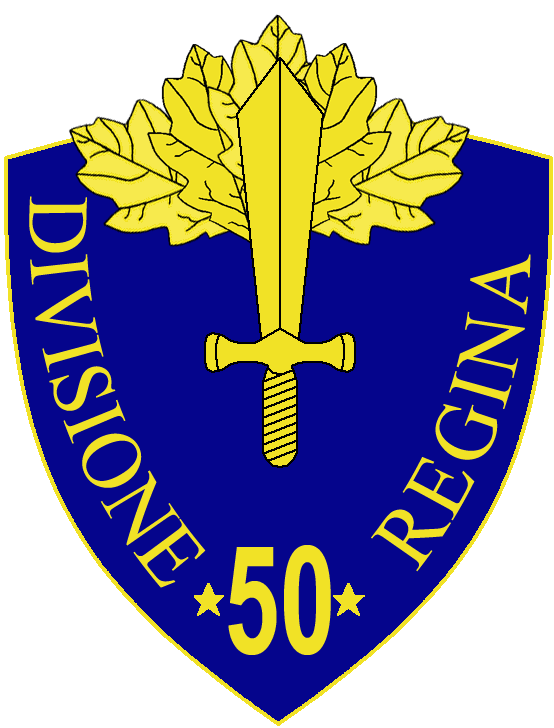
- 50th Infantry Division "Regina" insignia
- Active: 1 March 1939–16 November 1943
- Country: Kingdom of Italy
- Branch: Royal Italian Army
- Type: Infantry
- Size: Division
- Garrison/HQ: Rhodes
- Engagements: World War II

Commanders
- Notable commanders: General Alessandro Piazzoni

Insignia
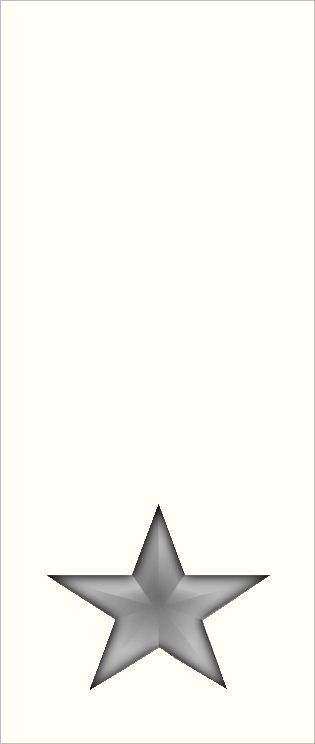
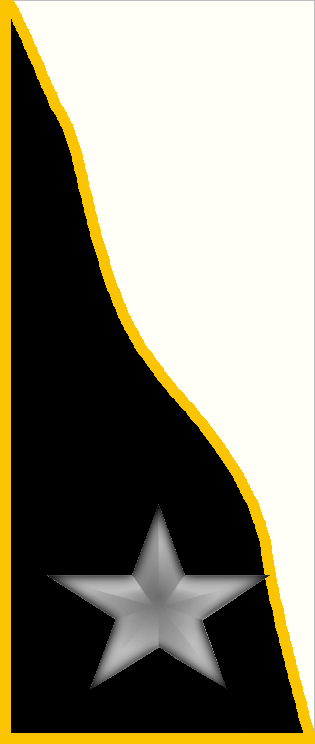
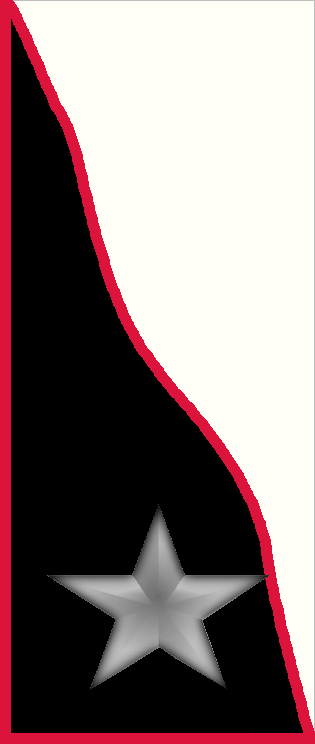
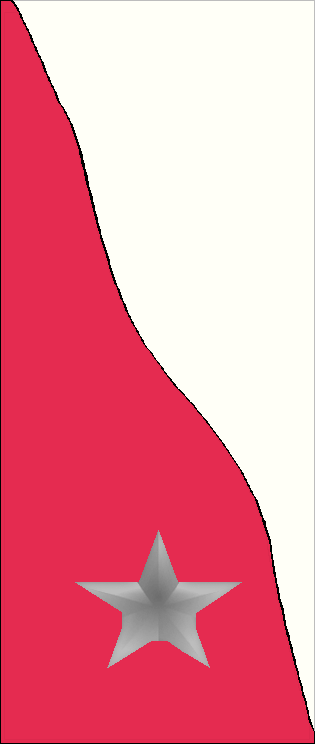
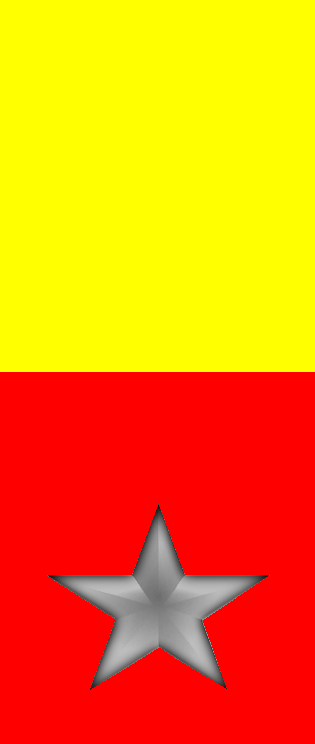
- Identification symbol: Regina Division gorget patches

The 50th Infantry Division "Regina" (Italian: 50ª Divisione di fanteria "Regina") was an infantry division of the Royal Italian Army during World War II. The Regina was formed on 1 March 1939 in the Italian Islands of the Aegean and entitled to the Queen (Italian: Regina). After the announcement of the Armistice of Cassibile between Italy and the Allies on 8 September 1943 the division fought Wehrmacht forces in the Battle of Rhodes. The majority of the division surrendered on 11 September 1943, while the III Battalion, 10th Infantry Regiment "Regina" resisted the Germans on Leros until 16 November 1943.

== History ==
The division's lineage begins with the Brigade of the Queen (Italian: Brigata della Regina) established in 1815, which on 25 October 1831 split to form the 1st and 2nd infantry regiments under the brigade's command. On 4 May 1839 the two regiments were re-numbered as 9th and 10th infantry regiments.

=== World War I ===
The brigade fought on the Italian front in World War I. On 30 September 1926 the brigade assumed the name of XXIII Infantry Brigade and received the 47th Infantry Regiment "Ferrara" from the disbanded Brigade "Ferrara". The brigade was the infantry component of the 23rd Territorial Division of Bari, which also included the 14th Artillery Regiment. Since 1924 the 9th Infantry Regiment "Regina" was based in Rhodes in the Italian Islands of the Aegean. The regiment's commanding officer doubled as commander of the Royal Army Troops Command Italian Islands of the Aegean (Italian: Comando Truppe Regio Esercito delle Isole Italiane dell'Egeo).

In 1934 the 9th Infantry Regiment "Regina" left the division and was assigned to the newly formed Armed Forces Command Italian Islands of the Aegean. The same year the division changed its name to 23rd Infantry Division "Murge". On 7 April 1937 the 10th Infantry Regiment "Regina" left the division and moved to Rhodes, where it was assigned to the Aegean Military Command.

On 1 March 1939 the 50th Infantry Division "Regina" was activated in Rhodes and received on the same date its two namesake infantry regiments and the newly formed the 50th Artillery Regiment "Regina".

=== World War II ===
On 10 June 1940, the day Italy entered World War II, the Regina had garrisons on the islands of Rhodes, Leros, Kos, Karpathos, Kasos, Kalymnos, Kastelorizo, Stampalia, and Patmos, with small detachments dispersed on other islands. On 1 August 1940 the division was reinforced by the 201st CC.NN. Legion.

On 20 November 1940, during the Greco-Italian War, two companies of the I Battalion, 10th Infantry Regiment expelled Greek sailors, which had captured Agathonisi island the previous day. On 25 February 1941 British forces landed on Kastelorizo in Operation Abstention. The islands was recaptured on 28 February 1941 by the IV Battalion, 10th Infantry Regiment. In early May 1941, in the aftermath of the Battle of Greece, the 10th Infantry Regiment on Kos, moved to capture the islands of Amorgos, Anafi, Ios, Naxos, Paros, Andros, Tinos, Kythnos, Kea, Serifos, Skyros, Mykonos, Samos, and Ikaria. The operation concluded without encountering Greek resistance.

On 27 May 1941 the Regina formed a tactical group for the planned invasion of Crete. This tactical group consisted of the I Battalion, 9th Infantry Regiment; II Battalion, 10th Infantry Regiment; an artillery battery; and the 9th Infantry Regiment's support weapon company. The tactical group landed near Sitia on 28 May 1941 and rendezvoused with German forces at Ierapetra on 1 June 1941, fighting in minor clashes along the way.

On 15 May 1942 the Regina was reinforced in Rhodes by the newly formed 309th Infantry Regiment "Regina", and on 24 October 1942 the 331st Infantry Regiment "Brennero" from the 11th Infantry Division "Brennero" joined the Regina.

==== Armistice of Cassibile ====
After the announcement of the Armistice of Cassibile on 8 September 1943 the garrison of Kastelorizo surrendered to British forces in the early moves of the Dodecanese Campaign. Part of the CC.NN. legion on Rhodes sided with the Germans during the Battle of Rhodes (1943) on 9–11 September 1943. On 11 September 1943 the commander of the Armed Forces Command Italian Islands of the Aegean Admiral Inigo Campioni ordered the Italian units on Rhodes to surrender. The Regina, with the exception of the 10th Infantry Regiment "Regina" on Kos and Leros, therefore laid down its arms on that date.

On 1–4 October 1943 the 10th Infantry Regiment "Regina", together with the British 1st Battalion, Durham Light Infantry and some RAF personnel fought the Germans in the Battle of Kos. Most of 3,500 men of the 10th Infantry Regiment "Regina" surrendered to the Germans without a fight. The Germans captured 1,388 British and 3,145 Italian prisoners on Kos. Between 4-6 October German troops executed the captured Italian commander of the island Colonel Felice Leggio and 101 of his officers, an event known as the Massacre of Kos. This was done in accordance with Adolf Hitler's order of 11 September 1943 to execute captured Italian officers.

On 12–16 November 1943 the III Battalion, 10th Infantry Regiment "Regina" and British forces, defended Leros during the Battle of Leros against the Germans, but had to surrender once the ammunition was exhausted. The last Italian forces to surrender was the garrison of Samos, which surrendered to the German on 22 November 1943 after prolonged aerial bombardment.

== Organization ==
50th Infantry Division "Regina" organization in 1940

- 50th Infantry Division "Regina", on Rhodes
  - Headquarters
    - Command Company
    - 2 × Carabinieri sections
    - 550th Field Post Office
    - 50th Infantry Division Command Transport Squad
  - 9th Infantry Regiment "Regina", on Rhodes (reinforced regiment to defend the island of Rhodes)
    - Command Company
    - 3 × Fusilier battalions (one battalion on Karpathos; during the war a IV Battalion was formed, which was transferred to the 309th Infantry Regiment "Regina" on 15 May 1942)
    - Support Weapons Battery (65/17 mod. 13 infantry support guns)
    - Mortar companies (81mm mod. 35 mortars)
  - 10th Infantry Regiment "Regina", on Kos
    - Command Company
    - 3 × Fusilier battalions (III Fusilier Battalion on Leros; during the war a IV Battalion was formed, which was transferred to the 309th Infantry Regiment "Regina" on 15 May 1942)
    - Support Weapons Battery (65/17 mod. 13 infantry support guns)
    - Mortar companies (81mm mod. 35 mortars)
  - 309th Infantry Regiment "Regina", on Rhodes (formed on 20 March 1942, arrived in Rhodes on 15 May 1942)
    - Command Company
    - I Fusiliers Battalion (former IV Fusiliers Battalion, 9th Infantry Regiment "Regina")
    - II Fusiliers Battalion (former IV Fusiliers Battalion, 10th Infantry Regiment "Regina")
    - III Fusiliers Battalion (former III Fusiliers Battalion, 265th Infantry Regiment "Lecce" of the LI Special Brigade)
    - Support Weapons Battery (65/17 mod. 13 infantry support guns)
    - Mortar Company (81mm mod. 35 mortars)
  - 331st Infantry Regiment "Brennero", on Rhodes (formed on 1 November 1941 by the 11th Infantry Division "Brennero", joined the Regina on 24 October 1942)
    - Command Company
    - 3 × Fusilier battalions
    - Cannons Company (47/32 mod. 35 anti-tank guns)
    - Mortar Company (81mm mod. 35 mortars)
  - 50th Artillery Regiment "Regina"
    - Command Unit
    - I Group (149/12 howitzers; re-equipped on 1 November 1942 with 75/27 mod. 11 field guns)
    - II Group (75/27 mod. 11 field guns)
    - III Group (75/27 mod. 11 field guns)
    - 350th Anti-aircraft Battery (20/65 mod. 35 anti-aircraft guns)
    - Ammunition and Supply Unit
  - L Machine Gun Battalion
  - L Mortar Battalion (81mm mod. 35 mortars)
  - L Mixed Engineer Battalion (formed in 1943)
  - 23rd Anti-tank Company (47/32 mod. 35 anti-tank guns; transferred from the 23rd Infantry Division "Ferrara" in 1942)
  - 50th Anti-tank Company (47/32 mod. 35 anti-tank guns)
  - 91st Engineer Company (entered the L Mixed Engineer Battalion in 1943)
  - 46th Telegraph and Radio Operators Company (entered the L Mixed Engineer Battalion in 1943)
  - 250th Engineer Company (assigned to the division in 1942, entered the L Mixed Engineer Battalion in 1943)
  - Medical Section
  - Supply Section
  - Transport Section

Attached to the division from 1 August 1940:

- 201st CC.NN. Legion "Conte Verde"
  - CCI CC.NN. Battalion
  - CCCI CC.NN. Battalion
  - 1st CC.NN. Mortar Company (81mm mod. 35 mortars)
  - 2nd CC.NN. Mortar Company (81mm mod. 35 mortars)
  - 201st CC.NN. Machine Gun Company

Attached to the division in 1943:

- L Chemical Battalion
- CCCXII Tank Battalion M
  - 1st Tank Company (L3/33 tankettes)
  - 2nd Tank Company (L5/30 light tanks)

Additional army units were directly subordinate to the Armed Forces Command Italian Islands of the Aegean under Admiral Inigo Campioni:

- Armed Forces Command Italian Islands of the Aegean
  - "Dodecaneso" Sector
    - 18 × Coastal machine gun companies
  - Carabinieri Grouping "Egeo"
  - Guardia di Finanza Grouping "Egeo"
  - 35th, 36th, and 55th Coastal Artillery Groupings
    - XVIII, XXIII, XXIX, XXX, XXXII, XXXIV, XXXV, XXXVI, XXXIX, XL and XLI groups
      - 19 × batteries and 5 × sections with 75/27, 6 × batteries with 75/27, 10 × batteries with 149/12, and 8 × batteries and 4 × sections with 105/28 howitzers, and 3 × batteries with 210/8 mortars
  - 56th Anti-aircraft Artillery Grouping
    - LXXXIII, LXXXIV, LXXXVI Anti-aircraft Artillery groups
      - 10 × batteries with 20/65 mod. 35, 7 × batteries with 75/27 C.A., 2 × batteries with 90/53, and 1 × with battery 75/27 C.K. anti-aircraft guns
  - Army Corps Engineer Grouping
  - Autonomous Coastal Artillery Group "Coo"
    - 6 × batteries
  - Autonomous Coastal Artillery Group "Scarpanto"
    - 3 × batteries

== Commanding officers ==
The division's commanding officers were:

- Generale di Brigata Pietro Pietracaprina (1 March 1939- 31 December 1939)
- Generale di Brigata Alessandro Piazzoni (1 January 1940 - 25 August 1940)
- Generale di Divisione Michele Scaroina (26 August 1940 - 11 September 1943)
