= 2nd Anti-aircraft Artillery Regiment (Italy) =

Inactive Italian Army air defense unit

- 2° Reggimento Artiglieria Controaerei
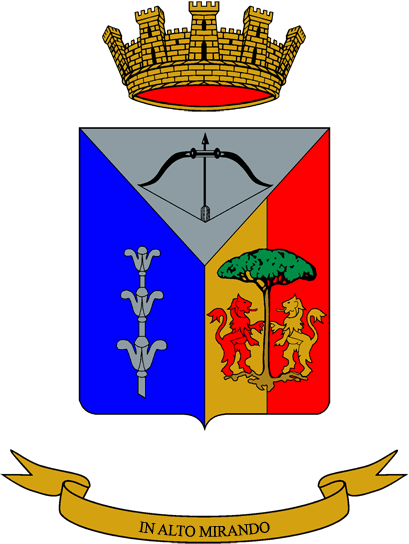
- Regimental coat of arms
- Active: 1 June 1930 — 13 May 1943; 1 June 1947 — 31 Aug. 1964; 1 Oct. 1992 — 30 Oct. 1996
- Country: Italy
- Branch: Italian Army
- Garrison/HQ: Ravenna
- Motto(s): "In alto mirando"
- Anniversaries: 15 June 1918 - Second Battle of the Piave River

Insignia
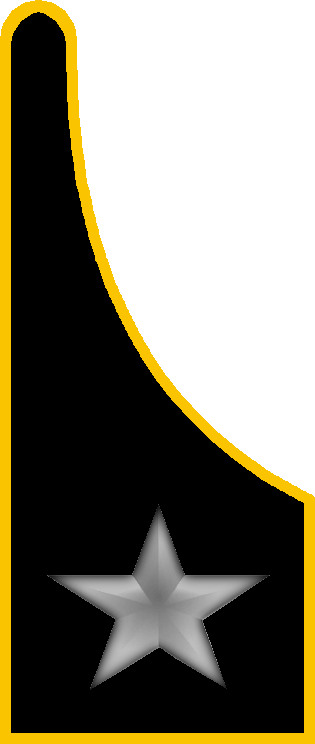
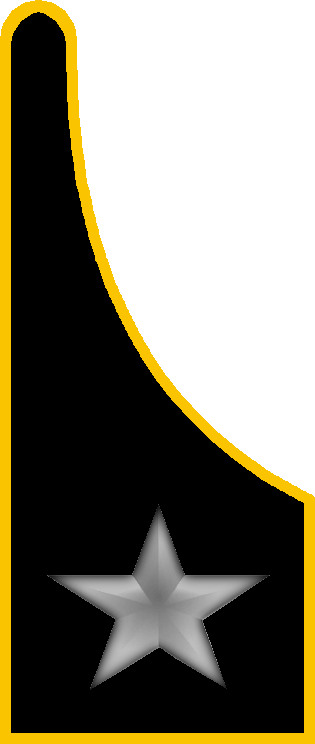
- Regimental gorget patches

The 2nd Anti-aircraft Artillery Regiment (Italian: 2° Reggimento Artiglieria Controaerei) is an inactive air defense regiment of the Italian Army, which was based in Ravenna in the Emilia-Romagna. Originally an air defense regiment of the Royal Italian Army, the unit was last active from 1992 to 1996. The regiment's anniversary falls, as for all Italian Army artillery regiments, on June 15, the beginning of the Second Battle of the Piave River in 1918.

== History ==
=== Interwar years ===
On 30 October 1926, the 10th Anti-aircraft Artillery Center was formed in Naples, which incorporated the existing 8th Anti-aircraft Group. On 1 January 1927, the center consisted of a command, a mixed group with two training batteries equipped with 75/27 C.K. anti-aircraft guns and one training battery equipped with 76/45 anti-aircraft guns, a photo-electricians unit, and a depot. The photo-electricians unit operated searchlights.

On 1 April 1930, the center received a trucked group with 75/27 C.K. anti-aircraft guns and a photo-electricians unit from the 5th Anti-aircraft Artillery Center. On 1 June of the same year, the center changed its name to 2nd Trucked Anti-aircraft Artillery Regiment. In April 1931, the two photo-electricians units were disbanded and both of the regiment's trucked groups formed a photo-electricians section and an acoustic locator squad with the personnel of the two disbanded units. In June of the same year, the regiment received a trucked group with 75/27 C.K. anti-aircraft guns in Palermo from the disbanded 12th Anti-aircraft Artillery Center.

On 1 January 1934, the regiment changed its name to 2nd Anti-aircraft Artillery Regiment and, on the 31st of the same month, the regiment transferred the trucked group in Palermo to the 12th Heavy Artillery Regiment. On 15 September 1935, the regiment was mobilized for the Second Italo-Ethiopian War. After mobilization the regiment formed the IV Trucked Group with 75/27 C.K. anti-aircraft guns and, on 23 March 1936, the 252nd and 253rd positional batteries with 76/45 anti-aircraft guns. The two batteries and the regiment's II Trucked Group, which was redesignated VII Trucked Group, were deployed to Cyrenaica in Libya. On 9 July 1936, the regiment was demobilized, with the exception of the VII Trucked Group, which since 16 April 1936 was based in Tobruk. On 7 October 1936, the VII Trucked Group returned to Italy and was disbanded.

In 1937, the regiment formed two trucked groups with 75/27 C.K. anti-aircraft guns: on 13 May the XX Group and on 1 October the XXI Group, both of which were transferred to Libya, where they were assigned to the XX Army Corps, respectively the XXI Army Corps.

=== World War II ===
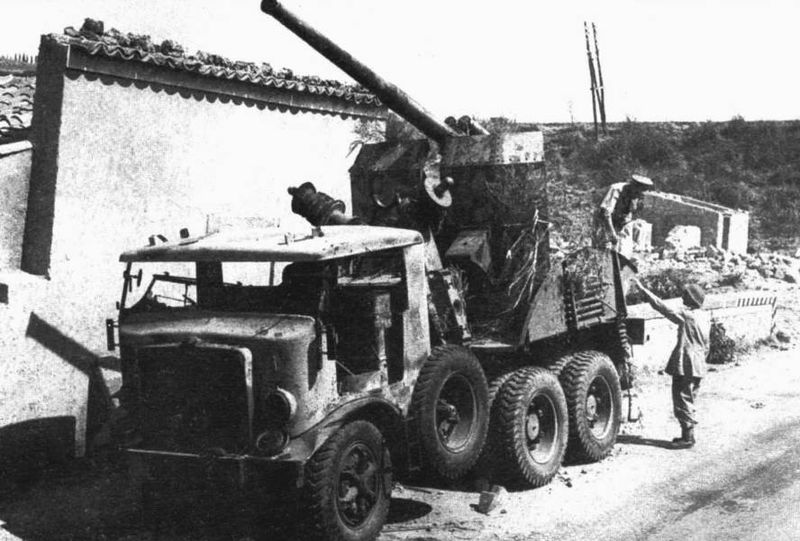
British troops in Sicily inspect an abandoned Breda 52 truck with 90/53 anti-aircraft gun

On 2 September 1939, the regiment was mobilized for service in World War II. At the time the regiment consisted of a command, a command unit, the III Group with 75/27 C.K. anti-aircraft guns, and the XXIV Group with 75/46 mod. 34 anti-aircraft guns. The XXIV Group was sent to Italian East Africa, while the III Group was assigned to the Territorial defense Command of Rome.

During the war the regiment's depot in Naples mobilized the following units:

- III Trucked Group with 75/27 C.K. anti-aircraft guns
- XVI Trucked Group with 75/27 C.K. anti-aircraft guns
- XLVI Trucked Group with 75/46 mod. 34 anti-aircraft guns
- XLVII Trucked Group with 75/46 mod. 34 anti-aircraft guns
- XC Trucked Group with 75/46 mod. 34 anti-aircraft guns
- XCI Trucked Group with 75/46 mod. 34 anti-aircraft guns
- DV Trucked Group with 90/53 anti-aircraft guns on Breda 52 trucks
- DVII Trucked Group with 90/53 anti-aircraft guns on Breda 52 trucks
- XLII Positional Group with 7.5cm PL vz.37 anti-aircraft guns
- LXX Positional Group with 75/46 mod. 34 anti-aircraft guns
- LXXI Positional Group with 75/46 mod. 34 anti-aircraft guns
- LXXII Positional Group with 75/46 mod. 34 anti-aircraft guns
- LXXIII Positional Group with 75/46 mod. 34 anti-aircraft guns
- XX Positional Group with 75/27 C.K. anti-aircraft guns
- LX Positional Group with 75/27 A.V. anti-aircraft guns
- XXVII Positional Group with 7.5 cm Flak M35 (d) anti-aircraft guns
- XXX Positional Group with 8.8cm Flak anti-aircraft guns
- LIII Positional Group with 20/70 autocannons
- LXXVI Positional Group with 20/70 autocannons
- D Positional Group with 20/70 autocannons; the group was used to protect Italian naval transports
- DL Positional Group with 20/70 autocannons
- DLI Positional Group with 20/70 autocannons
- DLII Positional Group with 20/70 autocannons
- CII Positional Group with 20/70 autocannons
- CIII Positional Group with 20/70 autocannons
- CIV Positional Group with 20/70 autocannons
- CV Positional Group with 20/70 autocannons
- CVI Positional Group with 20/70 autocannons

The depot also mobilized the command of the 31st Positional Anti-aircraft Artillery Grouping, which was deployed to Tripoli in Libya, and the command of the 40th Positional Anti-aircraft Artillery Grouping. On 23 July 1940, the regiment's command was sent to North Africa, where it incorporated the following groups:

- VI Group with 75/27 C.K. anti-aircraft guns, in Derna (from the 5th Anti-aircraft Artillery Regiment)
- VII Group with 75/46 mod. 34 anti-aircraft guns, in Benghazi (from the 1st Anti-aircraft Artillery Regiment)
- XV Group with 75/46 mod. 34 anti-aircraft guns, in Cyrene (from the 1st Anti-aircraft Artillery Regiment)
- XVII Group with 75/46 mod. 34 anti-aircraft guns, Bardia (from the 4th Anti-aircraft Artillery Regiment)
- XX Group with 75/27 C.K. anti-aircraft guns, in Tobruk
- XXI Group with 75/27 C.K. anti-aircraft guns, in Bardia (from the 1st Anti-aircraft Artillery Regiment)
- XXII Group with 75/46 mod. 34 anti-aircraft guns, in Bardia (from the 4th Anti-aircraft Artillery Regiment)

The regiment's groups were wiped out during the British Operation Compass and the regiment had to be rebuilt with the following units:

- XIV Group with 75/27 C.K. anti-aircraft guns (from the 5th Anti-aircraft Artillery Regiment)
- XLII Group with 7.5cm PL vz.37 anti-aircraft guns
- XLIII Group with 7.5cm PL vz.37 anti-aircraft guns (from the 4th Anti-aircraft Artillery Regiment)
- XVIII Group with 8.8cm Flak anti-aircraft guns (from the 3rd Anti-aircraft Artillery Regiment)
- XXIX Group with 8.8cm Flak anti-aircraft guns (from the 3rd Anti-aircraft Artillery Regiment)

The 2nd Anti-aircraft Artillery Regiment and its groups fought in the Western Desert campaign and the Tunisian campaign. The remnants of the regiment surrendered to the Allies on 13 May 1943 near Tunis and soon thereafter the regiment was declared lost due to wartime events.

=== Cold War ===
On 1 June 1947, the Italian Army reformed the regiment as 2nd Light Anti-aircraft Artillery Regiment in Mantua with the personnel and materiel of the VI Anti-aircraft Group of the 11th Field Artillery Regiment. The regiment was assigned to the Infantry Division "Legnano" and consisted of a command, a command unit, the I Group with 40/56 autocannons, and the II Group with 40/56 autocannons. The following August the regiment moved from Chieri to Albenga.

On 1 January 1951, the Infantry Division "Legnano" included the following artillery regiments:

- Infantry Division "Legnano", in Bergamo
  - Horse Artillery Regiment, in Milan
  - 11th Field Artillery Regiment, in Cremona
  - 27th Anti-tank Field Artillery Regiment, in Milan
  - 2nd Light Anti-aircraft Artillery Regiment, in Mantua

On 1 July 1951, the 2nd Light Anti-aircraft Artillery Regiment was reorganized as 2nd Heavy Anti-aircraft Artillery Regiment and transferred the I Light Anti-aircraft Group to the Horse Artillery Regiment and the II Light Anti-aircraft Group to the 11th Field Artillery Regiment. As replacement the regiment received the CIII Group with 90/53 anti-aircraft guns from the Anti-aircraft Artillery School.

In April 1952, the regiment added a second group with 90/53 anti-aircraft guns. In March 1954, the regiment added a third group with 90/53 anti-aircraft guns and the V Light Anti-aircraft Group with 40/56 autocannons. On 1 January 1956, the regiment received the VI Light Anti-aircraft Group with 40/56 autocannons from the 6th Mountain Artillery Regiment of the Alpine Brigade "Cadore". The next month the V and VI groups were renumbered and as IV and V groups. Also in 1956, the regiment replaced its 90/53 anti-aircraft guns with American 90/50 M1 anti-aircraft guns. On 10 October 1957, the regiment also received the VI Light Anti-aircraft Group with 40/56 autocannons from the 5th Mountain Artillery Regiment of the Alpine Brigade "Orobica".

At the end of 1957 the regiment consisted of the following units:

- 2nd Heavy Anti-aircraft Artillery Regiment, in Mantua
  - Command Unit
  - I Heavy Anti-aircraft Group with 90/50 M1 anti-aircraft guns
  - II Heavy Anti-aircraft Group with 90/50 M1 anti-aircraft guns
  - III Heavy Anti-aircraft Group with 90/50 M1 anti-aircraft guns
  - IV Light Anti-aircraft Group with 40/56 autocannons
  - V Light Anti-aircraft Group with 40/56 autocannons
  - VI Light Anti-aircraft Group with 40/56 autocannons

On 30 March 1960, the V and VI light anti-aircraft groups were disbanded, followed by the III Heavy Anti-aircraft Group on 1 October 1961. On 1 September 1963, the IV Light Anti-aircraft Group was disbanded, but on the same date the regiment reformed the III Heavy Anti-aircraft Group with the personnel of the disbanded group. On 31 August 1964, the regiment and its groups were disbanded and the regiment's flag was transferred to the Shrine of the Flags in the Vittoriano in Rome for safekeeping.

=== Recent times ===
On 30 September 1992, the 4th Anti-aircraft Missile Artillery Regiment in Mantua was disbanded and the next day reformed in the same city as 4th Anti-aircraft Artillery Regiment by reorganizing the regiment's 2nd Missile Group. On the same day, 1 October 1992, the regiment's 1st Missile Group in Ravenna was reorganized and then incorporated by the reformed 2nd Anti-aircraft Artillery Regiment. The reformed regiment operated MIM-23 Hawk surface-to-air missiles. On 30 October 1996, the 2nd Anti-aircraft Artillery Regiment was again disbanded and the next day the regiment's flag was once more transferred to the Shrine of the Flags in the Vittoriano in Rome.
