= 5th Anti-aircraft Artillery Regiment "Pescara" =

Inactive Italian Army air defense unit

- 5° Reggimento Artiglieria Controaerei "Pescara"
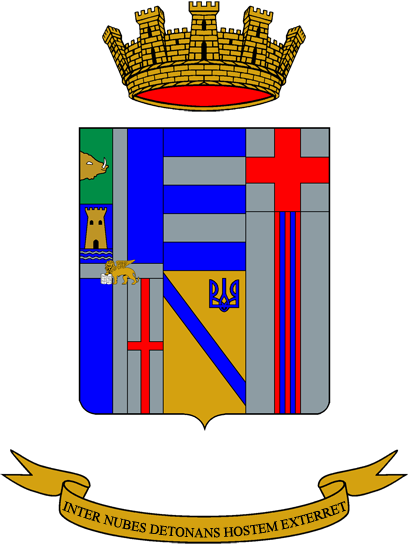
- Regimental coat of arms
- Active: 1 June 1930 — 8 Sept. 1943; 1 March 1947 — 26 Oct. 2012
- Country: Italy
- Branch: Italian Army
- Garrison/HQ: San Donà di Piave
- Motto(s): "Inter nube detonans hostem exterret"
- Anniversaries: 15 June 1918 - Second Battle of the Piave River

Insignia
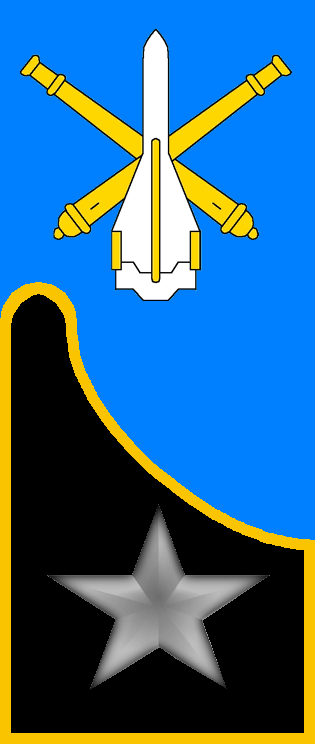
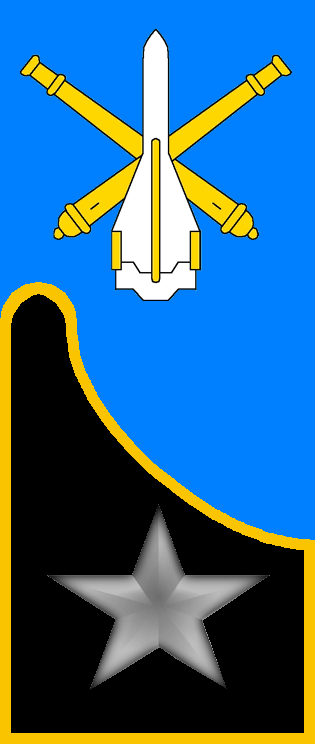
- Regimental gorget patches

The 5th Anti-aircraft Artillery Regiment "Pescara" (Italian: 5° Reggimento Artiglieria Controaerei "Pescara") is an inactive air defense regiment of the Italian Army, which was based in San Donà di Piave in Veneto. Originally a regiment of the Royal Italian Army, the unit was last active from 1947 to 2012. During the Cold War the regiment was equipped with MIM-23 Hawk surface-to-air missiles and formed, together with the 4th Anti-aircraft Missile Artillery Regiment, the air defense belt of the Italian Army in the country's Northeast. The regiment's anniversary falls, as for all Italian Army artillery regiments, on June 15, the beginning of the Second Battle of the Piave River in 1918.

== History ==
=== Interwar years ===
On 15 December 1926, the 9th Anti-aircraft Artillery Center was formed in Pescara, which incorporated the existing 9th Anti-aircraft Group. On 1 January 1927, the center consisted of a command, a mixed group with two trucked batteries with 75/27 C.K. anti-aircraft guns and a positional battery with 76/45 anti-aircraft guns, a photo-electricians unit, and a depot. The photo-electricians unit operated searchlights.

On 1 April 1930, the center received from the 6th Anti-aircraft Artillery Center a trucked group with 75/27 C.K. anti-aircraft guns and a photo-electricians unit. On 1 June of the same year, the center changed its name to 5th Trucked Anti-aircraft Artillery Regiment. In April 1931, the two photo-electricians units were disbanded and both of the regiment's trucked groups formed a photo-electricians section and an acoustic locator squad with the personnel of the two disbanded units. In 1933, the regiment moved from Pescara to Palmanova.

On 1 January 1934, the regiment changed its name to 5th Anti-aircraft Artillery Regiment. The same year the regiment moved from Palmanova to Padua. On 6 September 1935, the regiment was mobilized for the Second Italo-Ethiopian War. The regiment was sent to Sicily, with its command and I Group were deployed to Gela, while the II Group was deployed to Comiso. During the war the regiment's depot in Padua formed the 1st Battery with 20/65 mod. 35 anti-aircraft guns, which was sent to Italian Eritrea, and the 258th and 259th positional batteries, which were deployed to Cyrenaica in Italian Libya. On 12 July 1936, the regiment was demobilized.

=== World War II ===
At the outbreak of World War II the regiment consisted of a command, a command unit, and four groups (IV, VI, XIV, and XIX) equipped with 75/46 mod. 34 anti-aircraft guns. In 1940, the VI Group was sent to North Africa, where it participated in the Western Desert campaign. The IV and XIX groups were sent to occupied Albania, where they participated in the Greco-Italian War. In July 1941, the IV and XIX groups were assigned to the Italian Expeditionary Corps in Russia, which was Italy's contribution to the German invasion of the Soviet Union. In 1942, the two groups were assigned to the 4th Anti-aircraft Artillery Grouping, which also included the 5th Anti-aircraft Artillery Regiment's XXXVI Trucked Group. In December 1942, the 4th Anti-aircraft Artillery Grouping and its groups were destroyed during Operation Little Saturn.

During the war the regiment's depot in Padua mobilized the following units:

- XXXVI Trucked Group with 75/46 mod. 34 anti-aircraft guns
- LXXIV Trucked Group with 75/46 mod. 34 anti-aircraft guns
- CVII Trucked Group with 75/46 mod. 34 anti-aircraft guns
- DVI Trucked Group with 90/53 anti-aircraft guns on Breda 52 trucks
- DXXIV Trucked Group with 90/53 anti-aircraft guns
- DXXVI Trucked Group with 90/53 anti-aircraft guns
- XXIII Positional Group with 7.5cm PL vz.37 anti-aircraft guns
- XXIV Positional Group with 7.5 cm PL vz.37 anti-aircraft guns

In the evening of 8 September 1943, the Armistice of Cassibile, which ended hostilities between the Kingdom of Italy and the Anglo-American Allies, was announced by General Dwight D. Eisenhower on Radio Algiers and by Marshal Pietro Badoglio on Italian radio. Germany reacted by invading Italy and the 5th Anti-aircraft Artillery Regiment and its depot were disbanded by German forces soon thereafter.

=== Cold War ===
On 1 March 1947, the Italian Army reformed the regiment as 5th Light Anti-aircraft Artillery Regiment was reformed in Pisa with the personnel and materiel of the VI Anti-aircraft Group of the 33rd Field Artillery Regiment. The VI Anti-aircraft Group had participated on the allied side in the Italian campaign, first with the 184th Artillery Regiment "Nembo" of the 184th Infantry Division "Nembo" of the Italian Liberation Corps and then as part of the Artillery Regiment "Folgore" of the Combat Group "Folgore" of the Italian Co-belligerent Army. The 5th Light Anti-aircraft Artillery Regiment was assigned to the Infantry Division "Folgore" and consisted of a command, a command unit, the I Group with 40/56 autocannons, and the II Group with 40/56 autocannons. At the end of 1947, the regiment moved from Pisa to Padua and in September 1949 to Mestre.

On 1 January 1950, the regiment took administrative and disciplinary control of the CII Group with 90/53 anti-aircraft guns of the V Territorial Military Command. On 1 January 1951, the Infantry Division "Folgore" included the following artillery regiments:

- Infantry Division "Folgore", in Treviso
  - 33rd Field Artillery Regiment, in Padua
  - 41st Anti-tank Field Artillery Regiment, in Bassano del Grappa
  - 184th Field Artillery Regiment, in Treviso
  - 5th Light Anti-aircraft Artillery Regiment, in Mestre

On 30 January 1951, the 5th Light Anti-aircraft Artillery Regiment ceded its I Group to the 33rd Field Artillery Regiment and its II Group to the 184th Field Artillery Regiment and the next day the regiment was reorganized as 5th Heavy Anti-aircraft Artillery Regiment. The CII Group was now fully incorporated by the regiment, which also received the CI Group with 90/53 anti-aircraft guns, which, like the CII, had been formed by the Anti-aircraft Artillery School. On 18 July 1951, the two groups were redesignated as I and II heavy anti-aircraft groups. On 1 April 1953, the III Heavy Anti-aircraft Group with 90/53 anti-aircraft guns and the V Group with 40/56 autocannons were formed. In April 1956, the regiment replaced its 90/53 anti-aircraft guns with American 90/50 M1 anti-aircraft guns, and the V Group was redesignated as IV Group. On 13 May 1957, the regiment received the V Light Anti-aircraft Group with 40/56 autocannons from the 3rd Mountain Artillery Regiment of the Alpine Brigade "Julia". At the end of the year the regiment consisted of the following units:

- 5th Heavy Anti-aircraft Artillery Regiment, in Mestre
  - Command Unit
  - I Heavy Anti-aircraft Group with 90/50 M1 anti-aircraft guns
  - II Heavy Anti-aircraft Group with 90/50 M1 anti-aircraft guns
  - III Heavy Anti-aircraft Group with 90/50 M1 anti-aircraft guns
  - IV Light Anti-aircraft Group with 40/56 autocannons
  - V Light Anti-aircraft Group with 40/56 autocannons

On 15 May 1960, the V Light Anti-aircraft Group was disbanded. On 1 August 1963, the regiment was assigned to the army's Anti-aircraft Artillery Command and, on 31 August of the same year, the IV Light Anti-aircraft Group was disbanded.

On 10 October 1963, the Anti-aircraft Artillery School formed the 8th Anti-aircraft Missile Battery, which was the first Italian unit equipped with MIM-23 Hawk surface-to-air missiles. On 1 August 1964, the regiment was reorganized as air defense missile regiment and renamed 5th Anti-aircraft Missile Artillery Regiment. The regiment now consisted of the following units:

- 5th Anti-aircraft Missile Artillery Regiment, in Mestre
  - Command Unit
  - I Missile Group
  - II Missile Group
  - 25th Signal Company

On 28 September 1967, the I Missile Group moved to San Donà di Piave and, on 14 October of the same year, the II Missile Group moved to Rovigo. As part of the 1975 army reform the regiment's Command Unit was reorganized as Command and Services Battery. After the reform each of the two missile groups fielded 957 men (50 officers, 304 non-commissioned officers, and 603 soldiers). The regiment's new organization was as follows:

- 5th Anti-aircraft Missile Artillery Regiment, in Mestre
  - Command and Services Battery, in Mestre
  - 1st Missile Group, in San Donà di Piave
    - Command and Services Battery, in San Donà di Piave
    - 1st Missile Battery, in Plasencis (Site 1)
    - 2nd Missile Battery, in Terzo d'Aquileia (Site 2)
    - 3rd Missile Battery, in San Giorgio di Livenza (Site 3)
    - 4th Missile Battery, in Fontanafredda (Site 4)
  - 2nd Missile Group, in Rovigo
    - Command and Services Battery, in Rovigo
    - 5th Missile Battery, in Peseggia (Site 5)
    - 6th Missile Battery, in Conetta (Site 6)
    - 7th Missile Battery, in Marzanata di Trecenta (Site 7)
    - 8th Missile Battery, in San Rocco di Longare (Site 8)
  - 25th Signal Company, in Mestre

The 5th Anti-aircraft Missile Artillery Regiment was the Italian Army's forward deployed air defense unit, which covered the area of operation of the 5th Army Corps. The regiment operated from eight fixed sites, which were numbered from 1 to 8.

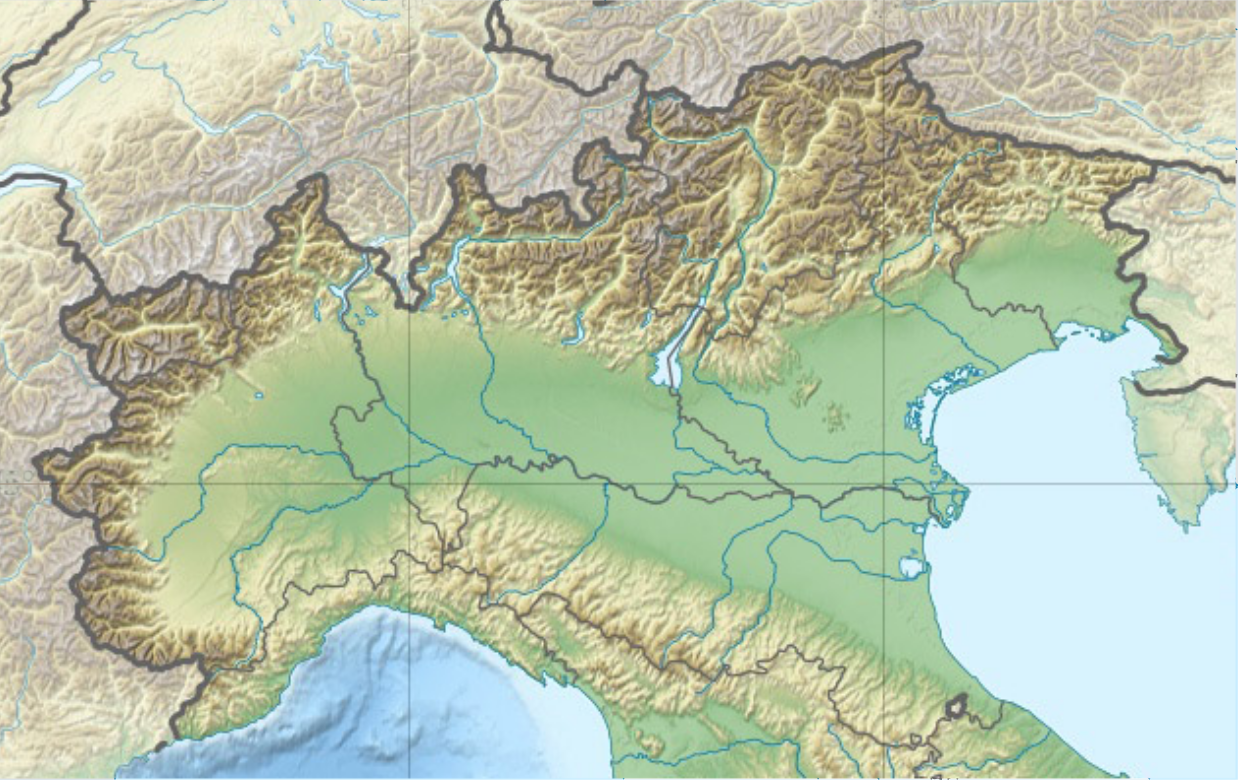
Location of the groups and batteries of the 4th Anti-aircraft Missile Artillery Regiment and the 5th Anti-aircraft Missile Artillery Regiment in 1989.

=== Recent times ===
On 13 September 1992, the 5th Anti-aircraft Missile Artillery Regiment was disbanded and the next day the regiment was reformed in San Donà di Piave as 5th Anti-aircraft Artillery Regiment by reorganizing the regiment's 1st Missile Group. The same day the 3rd Anti-aircraft Artillery Regiment was reformed in Rovigo by reorganizing the disbanded regiment's 2nd Missile Group. On 1 October 1997, the regiment was given the name "Pescara" to commemorate the city of its founding.

On 31 October 2001, the Missile Group in San Donà di Piave was disbanded, while at on the same date the flag of the 3rd Anti-aircraft Artillery Regiment was transferred from Rovigo to the Shrine of the Flags in the Vittoriano in Rome for safekeeping. The next day, on 1 November 2001, the flag of the 5th Anti-aircraft Artillery Regiment "Pescara" moved from San Donà di Piave to Rovigo, where it took over the base and missile group of the disbanded regiment. On 1 January 2002, the 5th Anti-aircraft Artillery Regiment "Pescara" was assigned to the Anti-aircraft Artillery Brigade, which, on 11 September 2009, merged with the Anti-aircraft Artillery School to form the Anti-aircraft Artillery Command.

On 26 October 2012, the 5th Anti-aircraft Artillery Regiment "Pescara" was disbanded and the regiment's flag was transferred to the Shrine of the Flags in the Vittoriano in Rome for safekeeping.
