= 4th Anti-aircraft Artillery Regiment "Peschiera" =

Active Italian Army SAMP/T air defense unit

- 4° Reggimento Artiglieria Controaerei "Peschiera"
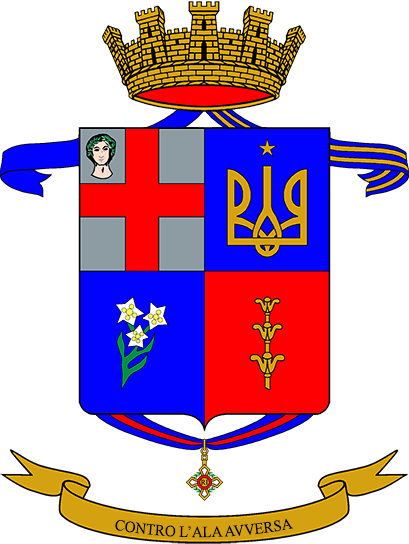
- Regimental coat of arms
- Active: 1 June 1930 – 8 Sept. 1943; 24 May 1947 – today
- Country: Italy
- Branch: Italian Army
- Part of: Anti-aircraft Artillery Command
- Garrison/HQ: Mantua
- Motto: "Contro l'ala avversa"
- Anniversaries: 15 June 1918 – Second Battle of the Piave River
- Decorations: 1× Military Order of Italy; 1× Bronze Medal of Military Valor; 1× Bronze Medal of Army Valor

Insignia
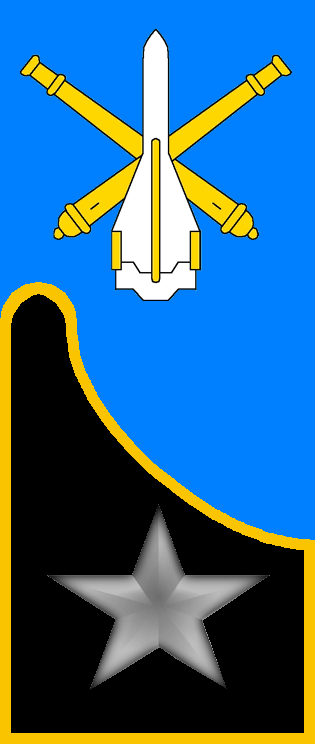
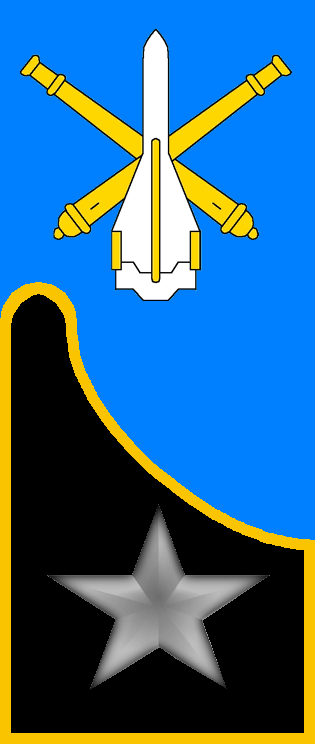
- Regimental gorget patches

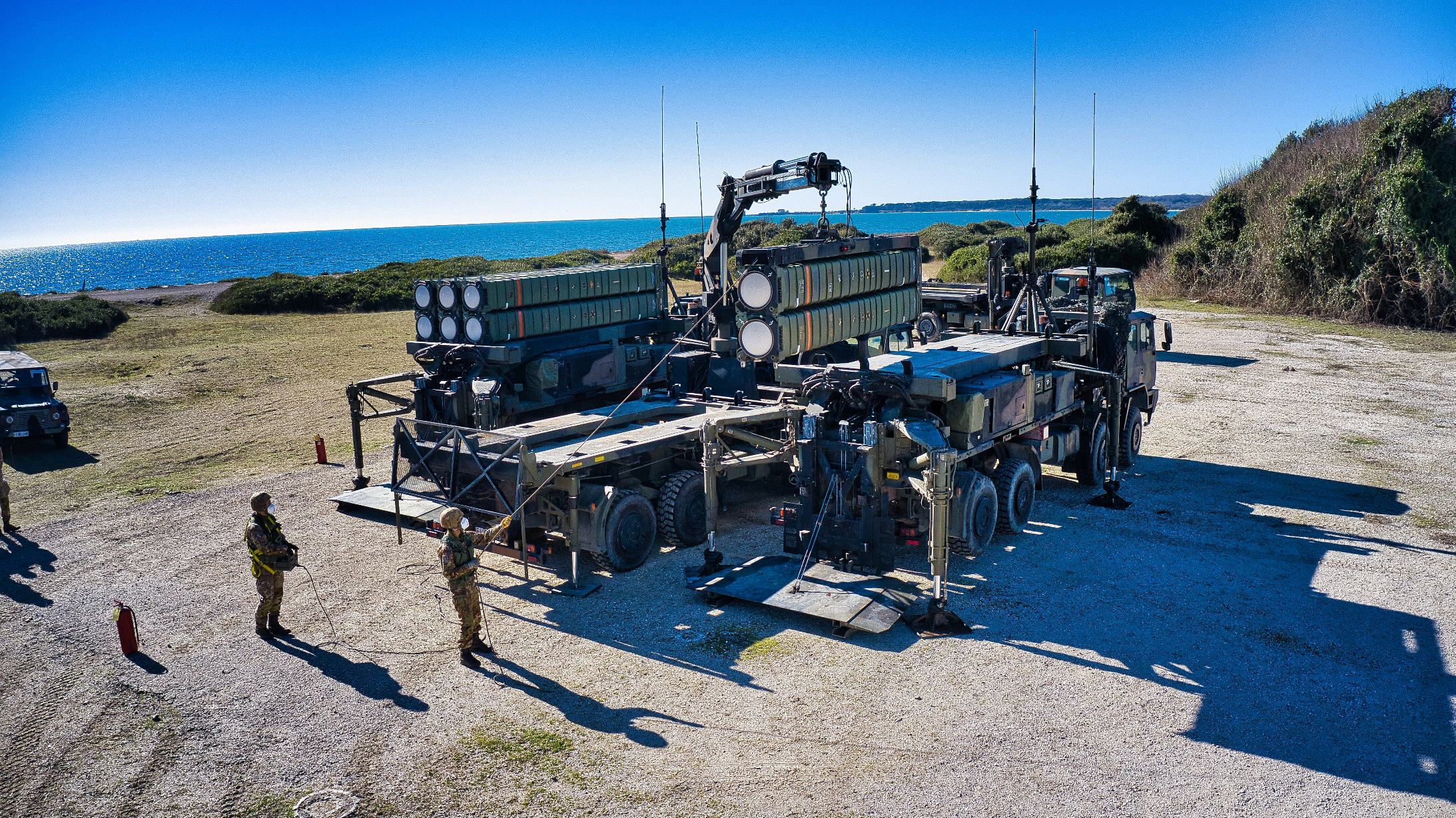
SAMP/T missiles being loaded onto the launcher

The 4th Anti-aircraft Artillery Regiment "Peschiera" (Italian: 4° Reggimento Artiglieria Controaerei "Peschiera") is an air defense regiment of the Italian Army. Originally an air defense regiment of the Royal Italian Army, the regiment is now based in Mantua in Lombardy and assigned to the Anti-aircraft Artillery Command. The regiment's batteries are equipped with SAMP/T air defense systems. During the Cold War, the regiment was equipped with MIM-23 Hawk surface-to-air missiles and formed, together with the 5th Anti-aircraft Missile Artillery Regiment, the air defense belt of the Italian Army in the country's Northeast. The regiment's anniversary falls, as for all Italian Army artillery regiments, on June 15, the beginning of the Second Battle of the Piave River in 1918.

== History ==
=== Interwar years ===
On 1 November 1926, the 4th Anti-aircraft Artillery Center was formed in Peschiera, with the existing III Anti-aircraft Group and one group from the disbanded 14th Heavy Artillery Regiment. After being formed, the center moved from Peschiera to Mantua. On 1 January 1927, the center consisted of a command, a trucked group with 75/27 C.K. anti-aircraft guns, a positional group with 76/45 anti-aircraft guns, a photo-electricians unit, and a depot. The photo-electricians unit operated searchlights.

On 1 April 1930, the positional group was transferred to the 7th Heavy Artillery Regiment, while the 3rd Anti-aircraft Artillery Center ceded its trucked group with 75/27 C.K. anti-aircraft guns and its photo-electricians unit to the 4th Anti-aircraft Artillery Center. On 1 June of the same year, the center changed its name to 4th Trucked Anti-aircraft Artillery Regiment. In April 1931, the two photo-electricians units were disbanded and both of the regiment's trucked groups formed a photo-electricians section and an acoustic locator squad with the personnel of the two disbanded units.

On 1 January 1934, the regiment changed its name to 4th Anti-aircraft Artillery Regiment. In September 1935, the regiment was mobilized for the Second Italo-Ethiopian War and deployed to the city of Marsala in Sicily. At the same time, the regiment's depot in Mantua formed the XI Group, which was deployed to Rome for the defense of the capital. On 10 March 1936, the regiment's depot formed the 256th and 257th positional batteries, which were transferred to Italian Libya, where they joined the 2nd Colonial Artillery Regiment. In July 1936, the regiment was demobilized and afterwards consisted of a command, a command battery, two groups of three batteries each, and a training battery.

On 10 January 1938, the regiment formed the 7th Trucked Battery with 75/46 mod. 34 anti-aircraft guns, which in June of the same year, was sent to Spain as part of the Corpo Truppe Volontarie, which supported the Nationalist forces under General Francisco Franco against the Spanish Republic during the Spanish Civil War.

=== World War II ===
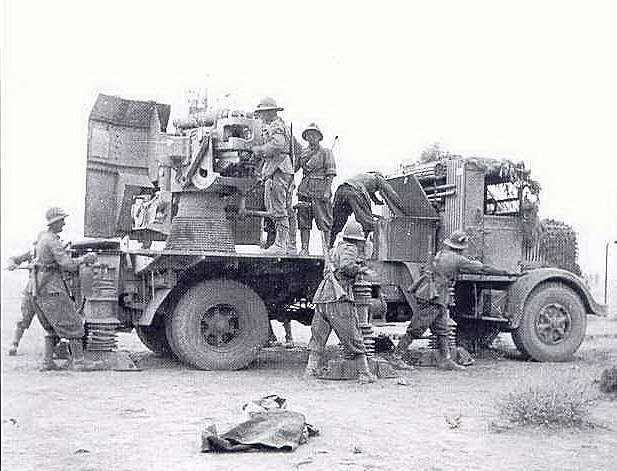
Lancia 3Ro truck with 90/53 anti-aircraft gun

At the outbreak of World War II, the regiment consisted of a command, a command unit, the II, IX, and XI groups with 75/27 C.K. anti-aircraft guns, XVII and XXII groups with 75/46 mod. 34 anti-aircraft guns, and one group with 20/65 mod. 35 autocannons. On 10 June 1940, the day Italy entered the war, the regiment was assigned to the Artillery Command of the 1st Army. On 28 June, the XVII and XXII groups were sent to Italian Libya for the Western Desert campaign. In early 1941, the XI Group was sent to occupied Albania, where it fought in the Greco-Italian War.

During the war, the regiment's depot in Mantua mobilized the following units:

- XXXVII Trucked Group with 75/46 mod. 34 anti-aircraft guns
- DI Trucked Group with 90/53 anti-aircraft guns on Lancia 3Ro trucks for the 132nd Armored Division "Ariete"
- DII Trucked Group with 90/53 anti-aircraft guns on Lancia 3Ro trucks for the 131st Armored Division "Centauro"
- DXXI Trucked Group with 90/53 anti-aircraft guns
- DXXII Trucked Group with 90/53 anti-aircraft guns
- DXXV Trucked Group with 90/53 anti-aircraft guns
- XLIII Positional Group with 7.5cm PL vz.37 anti-aircraft guns
- LXIV Positional Group with 75/46 mod. 34 anti-aircraft guns
- XXVIII Positional Group with 8.8cm Flak anti-aircraft guns
- XXXI Positional Group with 8.8cm Flak anti-aircraft guns
- XLVI Positional Group with 75mm mod. 13–17 anti-aircraft guns
- LXII Positional Group with 76/40 mod. 16 anti-aircraft guns
- LII Positional Group with 20/70 autocannons

The depot also mobilized the command of the 38th Positional Grouping. In April 1942, the 4th Anti-aircraft Artillery Grouping was formed, which consisted of the following units:

- 4th Anti-aircraft Artillery Grouping
  - Command Unit
  - XXXVI Trucked Group with 75/46 mod. 34 anti-aircraft guns (mobilized by the 5th Anti-aircraft Artillery Regiment)
  - XXXVII Trucked Group with 75/46 mod. 34 anti-aircraft guns (mobilized by the 4th Anti-aircraft Artillery Regiment)
  - XXXVIII Trucked Group with 75/46 mod. 34 anti-aircraft guns (mobilized by the 1st Anti-aircraft Artillery Regiment)
  - 31st Battery with 20/65 mod. 35 anti-aircraft guns (mobilized by the 1st Anti-aircraft Artillery Regiment)
  - 40th Battery with 20/65 mod. 35 anti-aircraft guns (mobilized by the 1st Anti-aircraft Artillery Regiment)
  - 42nd Battery with 20/65 mod. 35 anti-aircraft guns (mobilized by the 1st Anti-aircraft Artillery Regiment)
  - 65th Battery with 20/65 mod. 35 anti-aircraft guns (mobilized by the 4th Anti-aircraft Artillery Regiment)

The grouping was assigned to the 8th Army, which was sent to the Eastern Front. The grouping departed from Mantua on 13 June 1942. Upon arrival in Russia, the IV and XIX trucked groups with 75/46 mod. 34 anti-aircraft guns of the 5th Anti-aircraft Artillery Regiment were assigned to the grouping. The two groups had been deployed with the Italian Expeditionary Corps in Russia to the Soviet Union in July 1941. On 16 December 1942, the Red Army commenced Operation Little Saturn and the anti-aircraft troops were forced to use their anti-aircraft guns in the anti-tank role. Even though the Italian divisions resisted for two weeks the Soviet offensive destroyed most of the Italian 8th Army, and with it most of the 4th Anti-aircraft Artillery Grouping. The remnants of the grouping were repatriated in March 1943. For its conduct in the Soviet Union, the grouping was awarded a Bronze Medal of Military Valor, which today is affixed to the flag of the 4th Anti-aircraft Artillery Regiment.

In the evening of 8 September 1943, the Armistice of Cassibile, which ended hostilities between the Kingdom of Italy and the Anglo-American Allies, was announced by General Dwight D. Eisenhower on Radio Algiers and by Marshal Pietro Badoglio on Italian radio. Germany reacted by invading Italy and the 4th Anti-aircraft Artillery Regiment and its depot were disbanded by German forces soon thereafter.

=== Cold War ===
On 24 May 1947, the Italian Army reformed the regiment as 4th Light Anti-aircraft Artillery Regiment in Albenga with the personnel and materiel of the VI Anti-aircraft Group of the 155th Field Artillery Regiment. The regiment was assigned to the Infantry Division "Mantova" and consisted of a command, a command unit, the I Group with 40/56 autocannons, and the II Group with 40/56 autocannons. In July 1947, the regiment moved from Albenga to Cervignano del Friuli. On 1 December 1948, the regiment began with the formation of a group with 40/56 autocannons for the Armored Brigade "Ariete". On 1 July 1949, the new group was transferred to the 132nd Armored Artillery Regiment of the Ariete brigade.

On 1 January 1951, the Infantry Division "Mantova" included the following artillery regiments:

- Infantry Division "Mantova", in Gorizia
  - 3rd Field Artillery Regiment, in Gradisca d'Isonzo
  - 5th Field Artillery Regiment, in Palmanova
  - 18th Anti-tank Field Artillery Regiment, in Udine
  - 155th Field Artillery Regiment, in Udine
  - 4th Light Anti-aircraft Artillery Regiment, in Cervignano del Friuli

On 1 April 1951, the regiment formed a third group equipped with 40/56 autocannons. On 30 June of the same year, the regiment ceded its I Group to the 155th Field Artillery Regiment, its II Group to the 3rd Field Artillery Regiment, and its III Group to the 5th Field Artillery Regiment. The next day, the regiment was reorganized as 4th Heavy Anti-aircraft Artillery Regiment in Riva del Garda. On 1 November 1951, the CVI Group with 90/53 anti-aircraft guns, which had been formed by the Anti-aircraft Artillery School, arrived in Riva del Garda. On 4 April 1952, the Anti-aircraft Artillery School sent the next group with 90/53 anti-aircraft guns to Riva del Garda. In 1953, the III Heavy Anti-aircraft Group with 90/53 anti-aircraft guns and the V Group with 40/56 autocannons were formed. In 1955, the regiment moved from Riva del Garda to Verona.

On 1 January 1956, the regiment received the V Light Anti-aircraft Group with 40/56 autocannons from the 2nd Mountain Artillery Regiment of the Alpine Brigade "Tridentina". In February of the same year, the V and VI groups were redesignated as IV and V groups. Also in 1956, the regiment replaced its 90/53 anti-aircraft guns with American 90/50 M1 anti-aircraft guns. At the end of the year, the regiment consisted of the following units:

- 4th Heavy Anti-aircraft Artillery Regiment, in Verona
  - Command Unit
  - I Heavy Anti-aircraft Group with 90/50 M1 anti-aircraft guns
  - II Heavy Anti-aircraft Group with 90/50 M1 anti-aircraft guns
  - III Heavy Anti-aircraft Group with 90/50 M1 anti-aircraft guns
  - IV Light Anti-aircraft Group with 40/56 autocannons
  - V Light Anti-aircraft Group with 40/56 autocannons

In January 1960, the V Light Anti-aircraft Group was disbanded. On 1 August 1963, the regiment was assigned to the army's Anti-aircraft Artillery Command and the same month the IV Light Anti-aircraft Group and III Heavy Anti-aircraft Group were disbanded.

On 10 October 1963, the Anti-aircraft Artillery School formed the 8th Anti-aircraft Missile Battery, which was the first Italian unit equipped with MIM-23 Hawk surface-to-air missiles. On 1 October 1964, the regiment was reorganized as air defense missile regiment and renamed 4th Anti-aircraft Missile Artillery Regiment. The regiment consisted now of the following units:

- 4th Anti-aircraft Missile Artillery Regiment, in Verona
  - Command Unit
  - I Missile Group
  - II Missile Group, in Mantua
  - 24th Signal Company

On 1 August 1968, the regiment's command moved from Verona to Mantua and, on 15 October of the same year, the I Missile Group moved to Ravenna. As part of the 1975 army reform, the regiment's Command Unit was reorganized as Command and Services Battery. After the reform, each of the two missile groups fielded 957 men (50 officers, 304 non-commissioned officers, and 603 soldiers). The regiment's new organization was as follows:

- 4th Anti-aircraft Missile Artillery Regiment, in Mantua
  - Command and Services Battery, in Mantua
  - 1st Missile Group, in Ravenna
    - Command and Services Battery, in Ravenna
    - 1st Missile Battery, in Valli Basse Comacchio (Site 14)
    - 2nd Missile Battery, in Castiglione di Cervia (Site 15)
    - 3rd Missile Battery, in Passano di Coriano (Site 16)
    - 4th Missile Battery (Reserve), in Ravenna
  - 2nd Missile Group, in Mantua
    - Command and Services Battery, in Mantua
    - 5th Missile Battery, in Povegliano Veronese (Site 9)
    - 6th Missile Battery, in Zibello (Site 13)
    - 7th Missile Battery, in San Fiorano (Site 11)
    - 8th Missile Battery, in Manerbio (Site 12)
    - 9th Missile Battery, in Camatte di Suzzara (Site 10)
  - 24th Signal Company, in Mantua

While the 5th Anti-aircraft Missile Artillery Regiment was the Italian Army's forward deployed air defense unit, which covered the area of operation of the 5th Army Corps, the 4th Anti-aircraft Missile Artillery Regiment covered the 5th Army Corps rear, through which supplies and reinforcements would be moved towards the eastern Italian border. On 18 June 1986, the 2nd Missile Group moved from Mantua to Cremona.

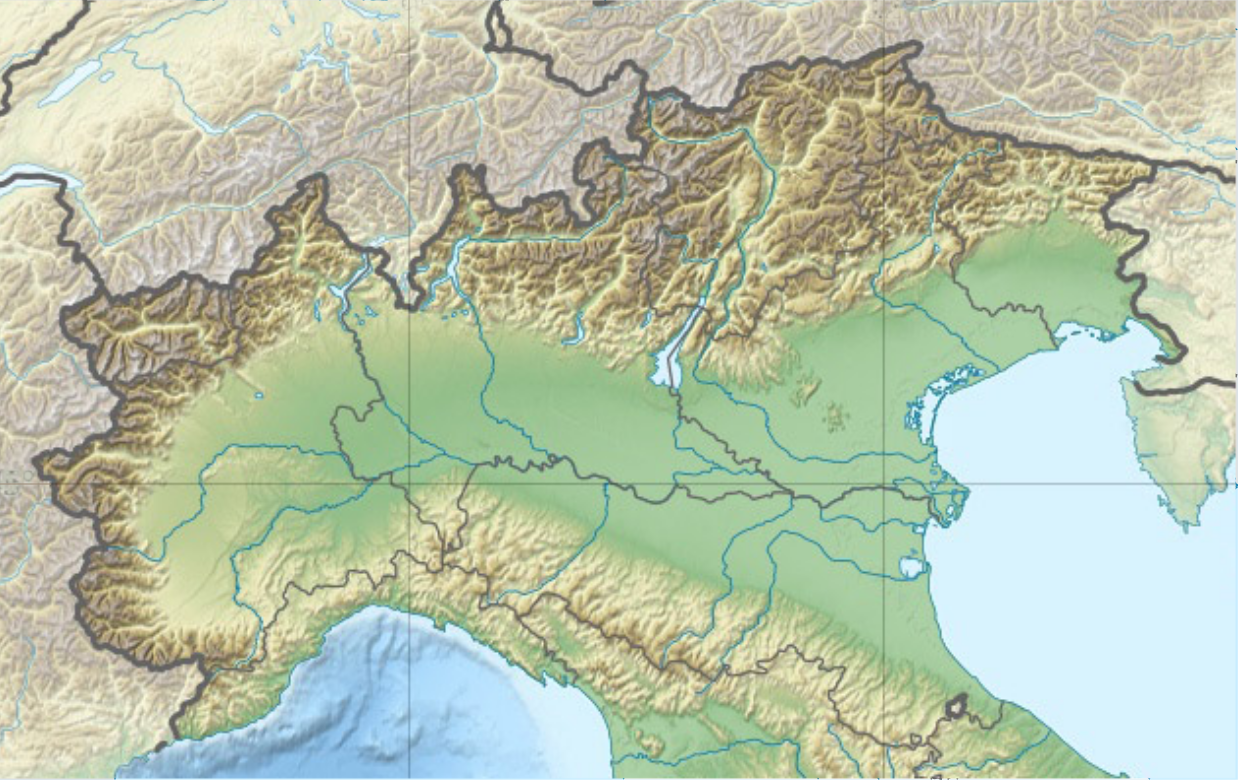
Location of the groups and batteries of the 4th Anti-aircraft Missile Artillery Regiment and the 5th Anti-aircraft Missile Artillery Regiment in 1989.

=== Recent times ===
On 30 September 1992, the 4th Anti-aircraft Missile Artillery Regiment was disbanded and the next day the regiment was reformed as 4th Anti-aircraft Artillery Regiment by reorganizing the regiment's 2nd Missile Group in Mantua. The same day, the 2nd Anti-aircraft Artillery Regiment was reformed in Ravenna by reorganizing the disbanded regiment's 1st Missile Group. On 1 October 1997, the regiment was given the name "Peschiera" to commemorate the city of its founding.

On 1 January 2002, the regiment was assigned to the Anti-aircraft Artillery Brigade, which, on 11 September 2009, merged with the Anti-aircraft Artillery School to form the Anti-aircraft Artillery Command. On 20 April 2011, the regiment was equipped with modern SAMP/T air defense systems.

== Organization ==
As of 2025 the 4th Anti-aircraft Artillery Regiment "Peschiera" is organized as follows:

- 4th Anti-aircraft Artillery Regiment "Peschiera", in Mantua
  - Command and Logistic Support Battery
  - Signal Company
  - Anti-aircraft Group
    - 1st SAMP/T Battery
    - 2nd SAMP/T Battery
    - 3rd SAMP/T Battery
    - 4th SAMP/T Battery
    - Fire Control and Support Battery

The regiment is equipped with SAMP/T air defense systems.
