= 12th Heavy Field Artillery Regiment (Italy) =

Inactive Italian Army artillery unit

- 12° Reggimento Artiglieria Pesante Campale
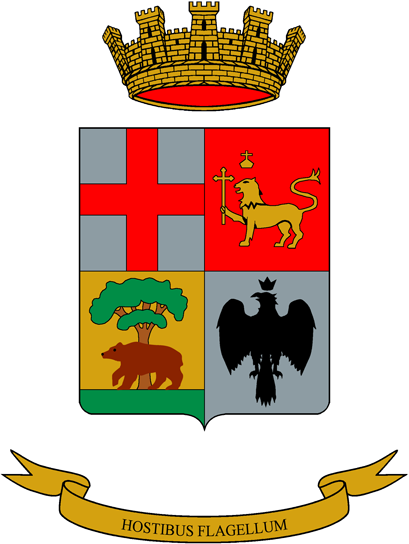
- Regimental coat of arms
- Active: 10 Aug. 1920 — August 1943; 1 Nov. 1986 — 20 Sept. 1992
- Country: Italy
- Branch: Italian Army
- Part of: 3rd Army Corps
- Garrison/HQ: Vercelli
- Motto(s): "Hostibus flagellum"
- Anniversaries: 15 June 1918 - Second Battle of the Piave River

Insignia
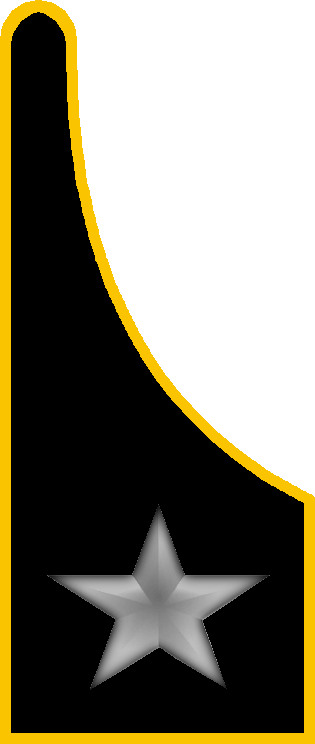
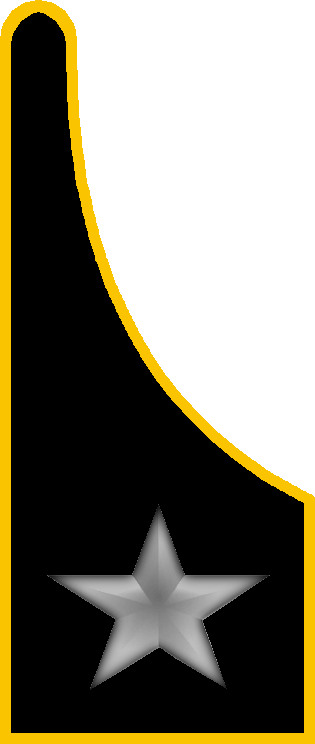
- Regimental gorget patches

The 12th Heavy Field Artillery Regiment (Italian: 12° Reggimento Artiglieria Pesante Campale) is an inactive artillery regiment of the Italian Army, which was based in Vercelli in Piedmont and assigned to the 3rd Army Corps. Originally an artillery regiment of the Royal Italian Army, the regiment was formed in 1920 with pre-existing groups, which had fought during World War I on the Italian front. During World War II the regiment formed an army corps artillery grouping, which in 1943 fought against the allies during the invasion of Sicily. The regiment and its depot were lost when allied forces entered Palermo on 22 July 1943, while the grouping was disbanded in August 1943 after it had retreated from Sicily to Calabria in Southern Italy.

In 1976 the Artillery Specialists Group "Centauro" was formed and assigned to the Armored Division "Centauro". In 1986 the division was disbanded, the group was transferred to the Artillery Command of the 3rd Army Corps. At the same time the group was renamed 12th Artillery Specialists Group "Biella" and assigned the flag and traditions of the 12th Heavy Field Artillery Regiment. In 1992 the group was disbanded and the flag of the 12th Heavy Field Artillery Regiment was transferred to the Shrine of the Flags in the Vittoriano in Rome.

The regimental anniversary falls, as for all Italian Army artillery regiments, on June 15, the beginning of the Second Battle of the Piave River in 1918. This article is about the Royal Italian Army's 12th Heavy Field Artillery Regiment, which was a support unit assigned to a corps-level command. This regiment is unrelated to the 12th Field Artillery Regiment, which was a support unit assigned to a division-level command.

== History ==
On 10 August 1920 the 10th Heavy Field Artillery Regiment was formed in Palermo. The new regiment's command was formed with the personnel of the disbanded 45th Field Artillery Regiment and the personnel of the 21st Heavy Field Artillery Grouping, which had been formed for service World War I. The regiment consisted of four groups, which had fought in World War I on the Italian front: the I and II cannons groups, which were equipped with 105/28 cannons, were the former XXXI and LII cannons groups, which had been formed during the war by the depot of the 1st Heavy Field Artillery Regiment, respectively the depot of the 6th Field Artillery Regiment. The regiment also included the III and IV howitzers groups, which were equipped with 149/12 howitzers. On 1 November 1926 the regiment was renumbered as 11th Heavy Field Artillery Regiment and on 1 October 1927 the regiment was renumbered as 12th Heavy Field Artillery Regiment.

On 31 January 1934 the regiment incorporated a V Group with 75/27 C.K. anti-aircraft guns, which had been transferred from the 2nd Anti-aircraft Artillery Center. On 1 October of the same year the regiment was renamed 12th Army Corps Artillery Regiment. In June 1935 the regiment's I Group was mobilized as IV Auto-towed Group with 105/28 cannons for the Second Italo-Ethiopian War. In July of the same year the regiment formed the I Group bis as replacement group, and in September the regiment formed the VIII Group with 105/28 cannons and the XII Replacements Group, but neither of the two was deployed overseas. On 1 March 1936 the regiment's depot in Palermo formed the 7th Motorized 65/17 Cannons Regiment, which consisted of two groups with 65/17 mod. 13 mountain guns. The new regiment was immediately shipped to Libya. After the end of the Second Italo-Ethiopian War the regiment's I Group returned and the three groups formed during the war were disbanded.

=== World War II ===
In 1939 the regiment consisted of a command, a command unit, the I and II groups with 105/28 cannons, the III and IV groups with 149/13 heavy howitzers, and the V Anti-aircraft Group with 20/65 mod. 35 anti-aircraft guns. During the war the regiment's depot in Palermo formed and mobilized the following unit commands:

- 12th Army Corps Artillery Grouping
- 43rd Coastal Artillery Grouping, which was assigned to the 230th Coastal Division
- 44th Coastal Artillery Grouping, which was assigned to the 206th Coastal Division
- VIII Anti-aircraft Group with 75/27 C.K. anti-aircraft guns
- XXI Cannons Group with 105/28 cannons (the regiment's former I Group)
- XXII Cannons Group with 105/28 cannons (the regiment's former II Group)
- XXV Cannons Group with 149/35 A heavy guns
- XXVI Cannons Group with 149/35 A heavy guns
- XXVII Cannons Group with 149/35 A heavy guns
- XLVIII Cannons Group with 105/28 cannons
- CXXI Howitzers Group with 149/13 heavy howitzers (the regiment's former III Group)
- CXXII Howitzers Group with 149/13 heavy howitzers (the regiment's former IV Group)
- CXLVIII Howitzers Group with 149/13 heavy howitzers
- 12th Army Corps Specialists Unit
- 29th Army Corps Specialists Unit

The regiment's depot also formed and mobilized the batteries for the group commands. The groups operated either under command of army corps artillery groupings or as autonomous units. The regiment and depot were lost during the Allied invasion of Sicily, when allied forces entered Palermo on 22 July 1943.

- 12th Army Corps Artillery Grouping: the grouping was mobilized on 10 June 1940, the day Italy entered World War II, and consisted of a command, a command unit, the XXI, XXII, and XLVIII cannons groups with 105/28 cannons, the CXXI and CXXII howitzers groups with 149/13 heavy howitzers, the 12th Army Corps Specialists Unit, and the 76th and 78th anti-aircraft batteries with 20/65 mod. 35 anti-aircraft guns. The grouping remained in Sicily and was assigned to the XII Army Corps, which was responsible for the defense of Sicily to the West of a line from Cefalù to Licata. In July 1943 the grouping fought against allied forces during the Allied invasion of Sicily. The grouping was heavily attrited in the fighting and the survivors were evacuated to Calabria in mainland Italy in early August, where, later in the same month, the grouping was declared lost due to wartime events.

=== Cold War ===
During the 1975 army reform the army disbanded the regimental level and newly independent battalions and groups were granted for the first time their own flags. On 20 October 1975 the 131st Armored Artillery Regiment in Vercelli was disbanded and the next day the regiment's Command and Services Battery and the regiment's Specialists Battery formed the Artillery Specialists Group "Centauro", which was assigned to the Artillery Command of the Armored Division "Centauro". The group consisted of a command, a command and services battery, and a specialists battery, which provided weather-ballistic data to the division's two heavy field artillery groups and to the artillery groups of the division's 3rd Mechanized Brigade "Goito", 31st Armored Brigade "Curtatone", and Mechanized Brigade "Legnano". At the time the group fielded 290 men (15 officers, 36 non-commissioned officers, and 239 soldiers).

In 1986 the Italian Army abolished the divisional level and consequently the Armored Division "Centauro" was disbanded on 31 October 1986. The next day, 1 November 1986, the Artillery Specialists Group "Centauro" was renamed 12th Artillery Specialists Group "Biella" and assigned the flag and traditions of the 12th Heavy Field Artillery Regiment. The group was named for the city of Biella, which had been one of the centers of the Italian resistance movement during the German occupation of Italy in World War II. For the conduct and the sacrifice of its citizens during the war the city was awarded Italy's highest military order, the Gold Medal of Military Valor. On the same date the group joined the Artillery Command of the 3rd Army Corps. On 13 July 1987 the President of the Italian Republic Francesco Cossiga confirmed the assignment of the flag of the 12th Heavy Field Artillery Regiment to the group.

=== Recent times ===
On 16 February 1991 the group was transferred from the 3rd Army Corps' Artillery Command to the Horse Artillery Regiment. On 20 September 1992 the 12th Artillery Specialists Group "Biella" was disbanded and on 8 October of the same year the flag of the 12th Heavy Field Artillery Regiment was returned to the Shrine of the Flags in the Vittoriano in Rome.
