= Cannone da 76/45 S 1911 =

- Type: Naval gun Coastal artillery Railway gun Anti-aircraft gun
- Place of origin: France

Service history
- In service: 1911–1945?
- Used by: Kingdom of Italy; Nazi Germany

Production history
- Designer: Schneider et Cie
- Designed: 1911
- Manufacturer: Gio. Ansaldo & C.
- No. built: 312
- Variants: Cannone da 76/45 CA

Specifications
- Mass: 2,204 kg (4,859 lb)
- Barrel length: 3.5 m (11 ft) L/46.9
- Shell: Fixed QF 76.2 x 699mm R
- Shell weight: 6 kg (13 lb 4 oz)
- Caliber: 76.2 mm (3.00 in)
- Breech: Semi-automatic horizontal sliding-block
- Recoil: Hydro-spring
- Carriage: Pedestal mount
- Elevation: -5° to +80°
- Traverse: 360°
- Rate of fire: 20-30 rpm
- Muzzle velocity: 756 m/s (2,480 ft/s)
- Maximum firing range: 6.4 km (21,000 ft) AA ceiling

The Cannone da 76/45 S 1911 was a naval gun used by Italy during World War I and World War II. In addition to its naval role it was also employed in coastal artillery, railway gun and anti-aircraft roles.

== History ==
The 76/45 began life as a French design from the Schneider company called the Canon de 76 mm Modèle 1911. The Italians bought a production license and the gun was produced by the Gio Ansaldo company. In service there were a number of designations such as the Cannone da 76/45 S 1911, 76/45 S Mod 1911 RM (Regia Marina) and Cannone da 76/45 CA (contre-aereo). During World War I Ansaldo produced 312 guns and 287 mounts in response to a request for anti-aircraft guns. These guns were emplaced on high angle pedestal mounts for static defense of high value targets and on armored trains of the Regia Marina.

During the 1930s the 242 surviving guns were assigned to coastal artillery and anti-aircraft units of the MVSN. These remained in use together with 66/47, 76/40, 77/28, 100/47, 102/35 and 102/45 due to insufficient numbers of the newer Cannone da 75/46 and Cannone da 90/53 guns. Guns captured by the Germans after the Italian defeat were designated 7.62 cm Flak 266/3 (i).

The most common anti-aircraft configuration was a fixed battery of four guns located near major cities, factories or military bases. Target range was measured by optical coincidence rangefinders and height by optical height finders. These coordinates were transmitted to a single fire-control station, which calculated target speed, altitude and direction to determine deflection angles. These calculations were then transmitted to each gun crew for barrage fire. Batteries also had associated searchlights and acoustic location devices.
