= Breda 51 =

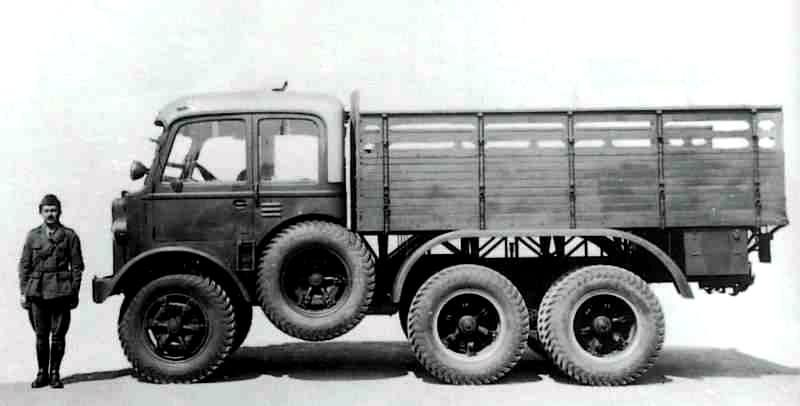

Overview
- Type: Truck/Artillery tractor
- Manufacturer: Breda
- Production: 1938-1941

Body and chassis
- Platform: 6x4

Powertrain
- Engine: Breda D11, 6-cylinder diesel, 8850 cc
- Power output: 115 hp at 1,800 rpm

Dimensions
- Length: 6.75m
- Width: 2.5m
- Height: 3m
- Curb weight: 8500 kg

The Breda 51 was an Italian multi-purpose off-road vehicle developed in the 1930s.

== History ==
The first prototype of a truck suitable for all types of terrain was presented by Società Italiana Ernesto Breda to the Studies and Experiences Office in December 1936. The assessments continued until 1938, including tests in Italian East Africa. The outcome was positive and after some essentially aesthetic modifications, 48 were ordered by the ministry. In parallel, it was adopted by the Royal Army, which used it on all fronts during the Second World War and, after the end of the conflict, by the Italian Army.

== Technology ==
The configuration is the 3-axle with advanced cab, common to the Dovunque vehicle family, such as the Fiat Dovunque 33, Fiat-SPA Dovunque 35 and SPA Dovunque 41. Traction is 6x4, on the two rear axles with twin wheels. The spare wheels were keyed in neutral between the first and second axles, as on all Dovunque vehicles, to facilitate the overcoming of obstacles.

== Versions ==
The Royal Army adopted it in the version with a reduced and more spartan cabin, the 'Breda 51' 'Colonial', used as a heavy artillery tractor for troops located mainly in Libya. In 1941 a model was produced with stronger chassis frame, the 'Breda 52', destined to become the basis for the later trucks.

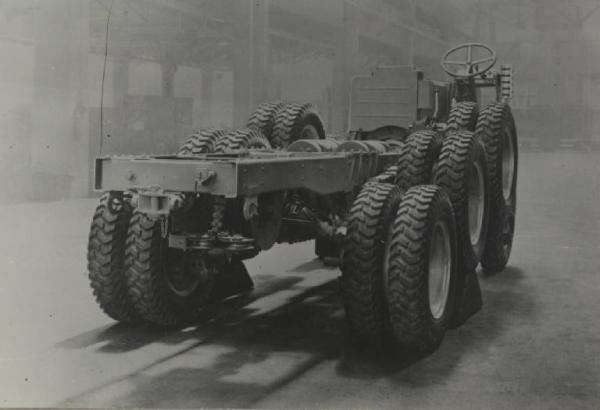

== Related items ==
- Autocannone Breda 52 da 90/53 [IT]
- Breda 501[IT]
