= Cannone da 90/53 =

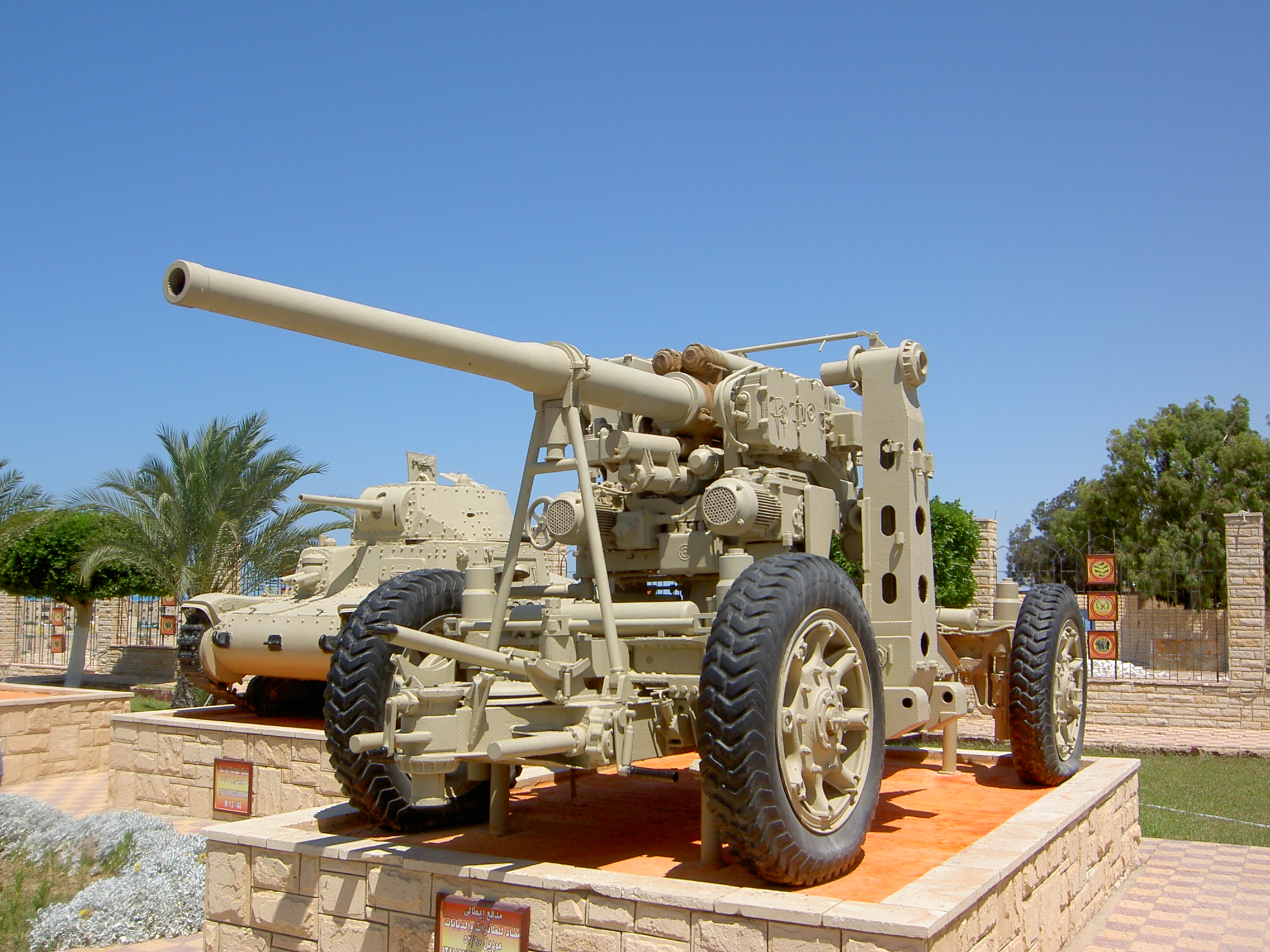
- Cannone da 90/53
- Type: Towed Anti-aircraft gun
- Place of origin: Italy

Service history
- Wars: World War II; Croatian War of Independence

Production history
- Designer: Ansaldo
- Designed: 1939
- Manufacturer: Ansaldo
- Produced: 1939–1943
- No. built: 539

Specifications (Cannone da 90/53)
- Mass: Traveling: 8,950 kg (19,730 lb); In action: 6,240 kg (13,760 lb)
- Length: 5.039 m (16 ft 6.4 in)
- Barrel length: 4.736 m (15 ft 6.5 in) L/53
- Crew: 6
- Shell: 90×679mmR
- Shell weight: 10.3 kg (22.71 lb)
- Caliber: 90 mm (3.54 in)
- Carriage: Four wheel carriage
- Elevation: -2° / +85°
- Traverse: 360°
- Rate of fire: 19 rounds/min
- Muzzle velocity: 850 m/s (2,790 ft/s)
- Effective firing range: Horizontal: 11.3 km (12,360 yd)
- Maximum firing range: Horizontal: 17.4 km (19,030 yd); Ceiling: 12 km (13,120 yd)
- Sights: Optical gun sight

The Cannone da 90/53 was an Italian-designed cannon used both in an anti-aircraft role and as an anti-tank gun during World War II. It was one of the most successful anti-aircraft guns to see service during the conflict. The naval version of the gun was mounted on Italian battleships of the Littorio and Andrea Doria classes.

The designation "90/53" meant that the gun had a 90-millimeter (3.5 in) caliber and a barrel 53 caliber-lengths long.

== History ==
=== Naval version ===
In 1938, after a development period, the Ansaldo company produced a new heavy AA gun for the Regia Marina, to replace the obsolescent Škoda 10 cm K10 and K11 used for that role on Italian warships; initially 48 calibers long, it was eventually brought to 50 calibers.

The Cannone da 90/50 Ansaldo Model 1938 and OTO Model 1939 had an autofretted monobloc barrel with a screwed-on breech ring containing the horizontal sliding breech block and seatings for the recoil and run-out cylinders. The most interesting part of the weapon was the single quadriaxial mounting designed for it: those were pre-stabilized, with a complex system controlled by 11 gyros, with two electric motors providing the necessary RPC; the whole complex was enclosed in an oval shielded turret, mainly to protect it from the blast effects from the battleship's main caliber guns. The turret weighed some 20 tons, and the practical rate of fire was 12 rounds per minute. After testing on the armoured cruiser San Giorgio, the 90/50 was fitted on the new Littorio-class battleships and the two Andrea Doria-class battleships being rebuilt, for a respective total of 12 and 10 mountings.

This system has been described as too advanced and ahead of its day, and, while ballistically the gun had good performance, the mountings proved delicate. In the Andrea Doria-class battleships the electrical RPC motors were removed in 1942 because of water damage; on the Littorio-class battleships, where the mountings were placed higher, the RPC was retained. Early rounds tended to be flawed and fragment into very small pieces, reducing their effectiveness, although improved rounds were issued during the war.

Croatian sources claim that after the war, the twelve 90/50 guns from the Italian battleship Vittorio Veneto were assigned to Yugoslavia as a part of war reparations. They were mounted on two six-gun coastal artillery batteries on Žirje island, off Šibenik, as a part of the Cold War defense strategy. These guns saw action in September 1991 during the Croatian War of Independence, deterring the Yugoslav People's Army assault on Šibenik and blocking 34 Yugoslav Navy's patrol boats and minesweepers which were later captured by Croatian forces in the inner harbor.

=== Land version ===
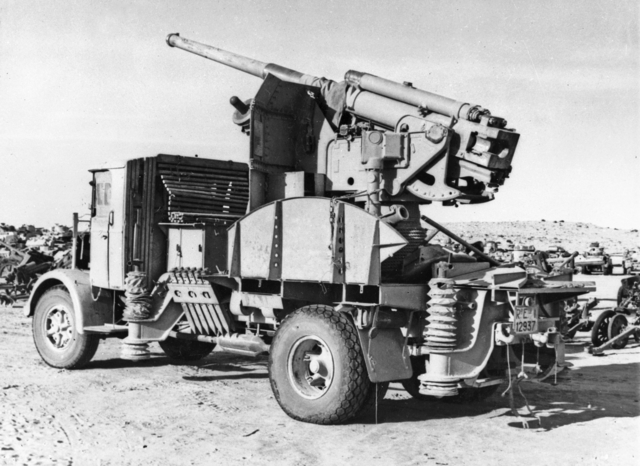
Cannone da 90/53 on Lancia truck abandoned by Rommel's army in February 1943

The Cannone da 90/53, derived from the naval version, was also designed by Ansaldo, with the first examples being produced in 1939. The original plan was for the gun to be manufactured in three variants:

- The Modello 41P was for static emplacement; 1,087 were ordered.
- The Modello 41C was to be towed; 660 were ordered.
- 57 were ordered to be mounted on heavy trucks designated autocannoni da 90/53.

Italian industry was not up to producing these quantities and by the end of production in July 1943 only 539 guns had been delivered, including 48 converted for use on the Semovente 90/53 heavy tank destroyer; some, owing to delays in producing the adequate mountings, were fitted on makeshift ones or on the flatbed of trucks like the Lancia 3Ro and the Breda 52 and were designated Autocannone da 90/53 su Breda 52.

Drawing upon the German experience with the comparable 8.8 cm FlaK 18, the gun was also used as field artillery in the indirect fire role or as an anti-tank gun. In the latter role its AP shell could penetrate 140 millimetres (5.5 in) of armour at 500 metres (550 yd), and 120 millimetres (4.7 in) at 1,000 metres (1,100 yd), and possibly up to 206 millimetres (8.1 in), thus being able to destroy any Allied tank it faced in North Africa and mainland Italy.

After Italy surrendered, guns captured by Wehrmacht forces were designated 9-cm Flak 309/1(i). Some of these guns were used for the air defence of Germany, while others were kept in service in Italy.

== Users ==
- Croatia
- Germany
- Italy
- Yugoslavia

== See also ==
- Cannone da 75/46 C.A. modello 34
- Italian Army equipment in World War II

=== Weapons of comparable role, performance and era ===
- 8.8 cm Flak 18/36/37/41
- QF 3.7-inch AA gun
- 90 mm Gun M1/M2/M3
- 85 mm air defense gun M1939 (52-K)
- Type 99 88 mm AA gun
- Canon de 90 mm Modèle 1926
