= 90 mm gun M1/M2/M3 =

Type of anti-aircraft gun and anti-tank gun (M1, M2) and tank gun (M3)

90 mm M1/M2
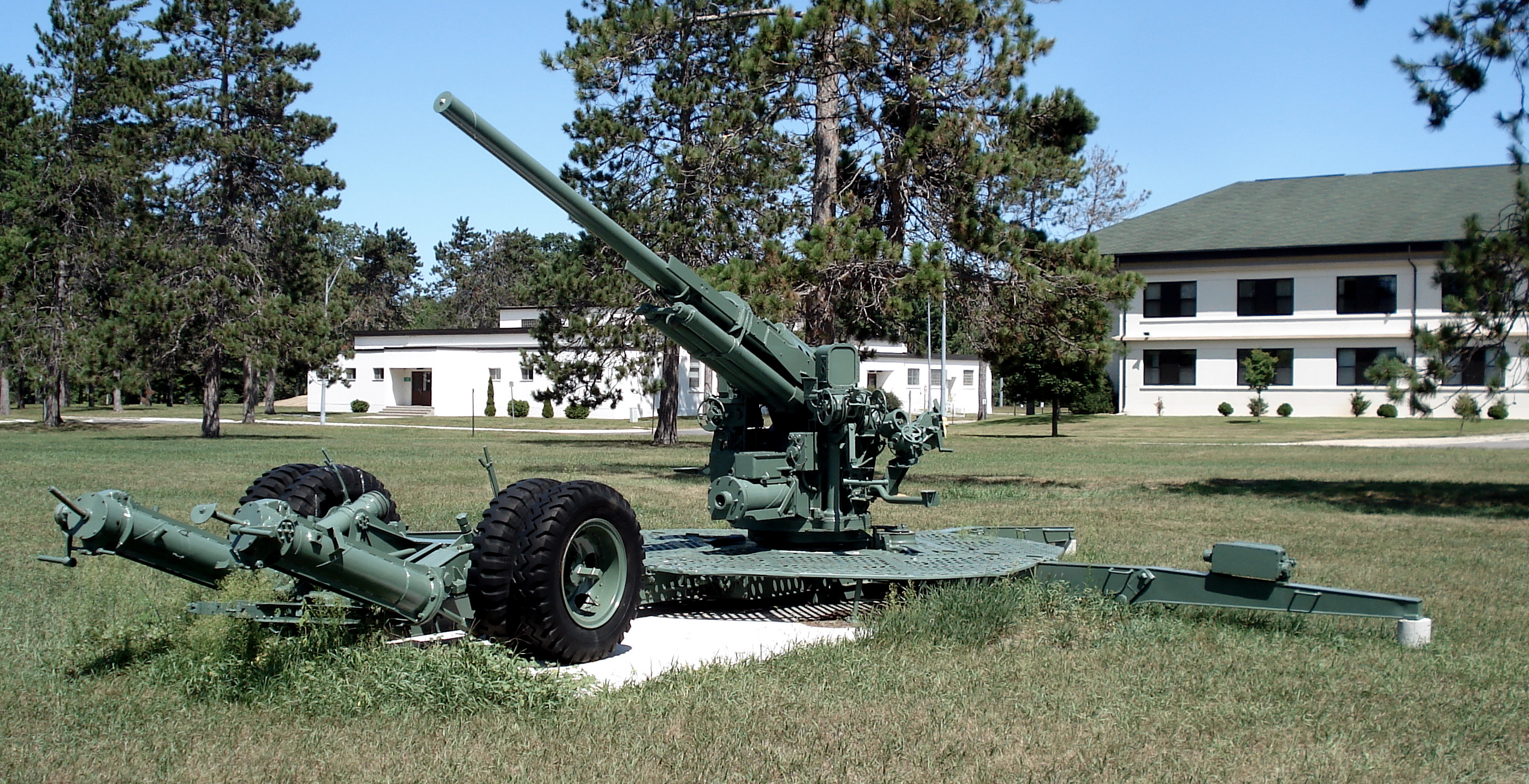
- A 90 mm M1 at CFB Borden
- Type: Anti-aircraft gun
- Place of origin: United States

Service history
- In service: 1938–1960
- Used by: United States; Canada; France; Turkey
- Wars: World War II; Korean War

Production history
- Produced: 1940–
- No. built: 133,833 (M1, M2) (1940–1945); 6,648 (M1A1)
- Variants: See § Variants

Specifications
- Mass: M1A1: 19,000 lb (8,600 kg); M2: 32,300 lb (14,700 kg)
- Length: M1A1: 29.6 ft (9.0 m)
- Barrel length: 200 in (5,100 mm) L/55 (55 caliber)
- Width: M1A1: 13.6 ft (4.1 m)
- Height: M1A1: 10.1 ft (3.1 m)
- Crew: M1: 8 (1× gunner 7× loader); M2: 8 (1× gunner 7× loader)
- Shell: 90 x 600-615mmR: M3 HE: 3.5 in × 37.44 in (90 mm × 950 mm) (M71 complete round); M3 APC: 3.5 in × 38.24 in (90 mm × 970 mm) (M82 complete round); M3 AP: 3.5 in × 32.75 in (90 mm × 830 mm) (M77 complete round)
- Shell weight: M71 HE: 23.29 lb (10.56 kg) projectile, 41.93 lb (19.02 kg) complete; M82 APC: 24.11 lb (10.94 kg) projectile, 42.75 lb (19.39 kg) complete; M77 AP: 23.40 lb (10.61 kg) projectile, 42.04 lb (19.07 kg) complete
- Calibre: 90 mm (3.5 in)
- Elevation: M1: -10° to +90°; M2: -10° to +90°
- Traverse: 360°
- Rate of fire: 10 rpm
- Muzzle velocity: M3 HE and AP: 2,700 ft/s (820 m/s); M3 APC: 2,670 ft/s (810 m/s)
- Maximum firing range: Maximum horizontal: M1A1: 62,474 ft (19,042 m); Maximum ceiling: M1A1: 43,500 ft (13,300 m)

The 90 mm gun M1/M2/M3 was an American heavy anti-aircraft and anti-tank gun, playing a role similar to the German 8.8cm Flak 18. It had a 3.5 in (90 mm) diameter bore, and a 50 caliber barrel, giving it a length of 15 ft (4.6 m). It was capable of firing a 3.5 in × 23.6 in (90 mm × 600 mm) shell 62,474 ft (19,042 m) horizontally, or a maximum altitude of 43,500 ft (13,300 m).

The 90 mm gun was the US Army's primary heavy anti-aircraft gun from just prior to the opening of World War II into 1946, complemented by small numbers of the much larger 120 mm M1 gun. Both were widely deployed in the United States postwar as the Cold War presented a perceived threat from Soviet bombers. The anti-aircraft guns were phased out in the middle 1950s as their role was taken over by surface-to-air missiles such as the MIM-3 Nike Ajax.

As a tank gun it was the main weapon of the M36 tank destroyer and M26 Pershing tank, as well as a number of post-war vehicles like the M56 Scorpion. It was also briefly deployed from 1943–1946 as a coast defense weapon with the United States Army Coast Artillery Corps. Each gun cost roughly $50,000 to make in 1940 and utilized up to 30 separate contractors to manufacture.

== History ==
Prior to World War II, the primary US anti-aircraft guns were the 3-inch M1918 gun (76.2 mm L/40) and its modernized successor, the 3-inch anti-aircraft gun M3 (76.2 mm L/50); 3 inches or 76.2 mm was a widely used caliber for this class of weapon at the time, and similar weapons were in British, Soviet and other arsenals. There had been several upgrades to the weapon over its history, including the experimental T8 and T9 versions developed in the early 1930s, that were intended to enter service later in that decade.

However, the US Army became interested in a much more capable weapon instead, and on 9 June 1938, it issued a development contract calling for two new guns, one of 90 mm caliber, which it felt had the largest possible projectiles that were capable of being manually loaded when the gun was at high elevations, and another (using mechanically assisted loading) of 120 mm (4.7 in) caliber. On 18 August 1938 the development of the Mount T1 was approved as well. The new design seemed so much better than developments of the older three-inch that work on the three-inch T9 was canceled in 1938, just as it became production-ready. On 21 March 1940, the second development of the 90 mm design, the T2, was standardized as the 90 mm M1, while its larger cousin became the 120 mm M1 gun.

A few hundred M1s were completed when several improvements were added to produce the 90 mm M1A1, which entered production in late 1940, and was accepted as standard on 22 May 1941. Since national arsenals had limited capacity, production of the first 300 gun mounts was contracted to Allis-Chalmers in November 1940, with the first unit shipped to the Army in September 1941. The M1A1 included an improved mount and spring-rammer on the breech, with the result that firing rates went up to 20 rounds per minute. Several thousand were available when the US entered the war, and the M1A1 was the standard anti-aircraft gun for the rest of the conflict. Production rates continued to improve, topping out in a few thousand per month.

Year	1941	1942	1943	1944	1945	Total
Production	171	3286	4074	300	0	7831

Like the German 8.8 cm Flak 18/36/37/41 and the British QF 3.7 inch AA gun, the M1A1 was used against tanks in combat but, unlike the others, the original mount design could not be depressed low enough to allow fire against them. On 11 September 1942, the Army issued specifications for a new mount to allow it to be used in this role, which resulted in the 90 mm M2, introducing a new mount that could be depressed to 10 degrees below the horizontal and featured a new electrically assisted rammer. It became the standard weapon from 13 May 1943.

== Anti-aircraft operation ==
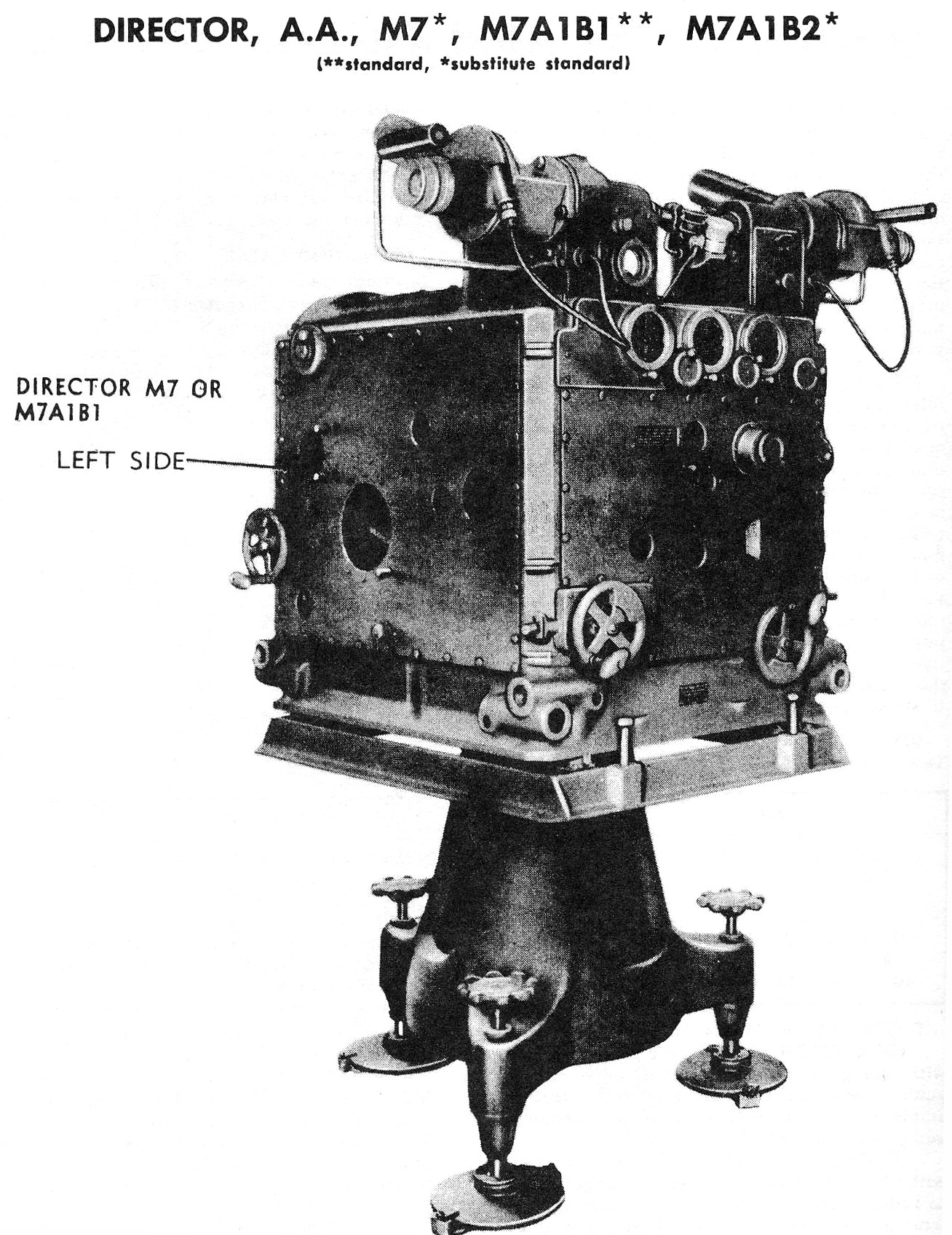
M7 gun director, 1944

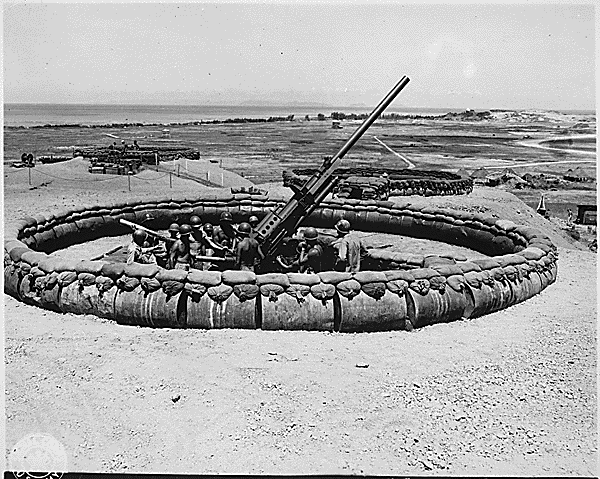
View of a 90 mm anti-aircraft gun emplacement, Okinawa, 1945

In anti-aircraft use, the guns were normally operated in groups of four, controlled by the M7 or M9 gun director or Kerrison predictors. Radar direction was common, starting with the SCR-268 in 1941, which was not accurate enough to directly lay the guns, but provided accurate ranging throughout the engagement. For night-time use, a searchlight was slaved to the radar with a beam width set so that the target would be somewhere in the beam when it was turned on, at which point the engagement continued as in the day. In 1944, the system was upgraded with the addition of the SCR-584 microwave radar, which was accurate to about 0.06 degrees (1 mil) and also provided automatic tracking. With the SCR-584, direction and range information was sent directly to the Bell Labs M3 gun data computer, and M9 director, which could direct and lay the guns automatically, all the crews had to do was load the guns.

== Main anti-tank developments ==
=== 90 mm gun M3 ===
The M3 was also adapted as the main gun for various armored vehicles, starting with the experimental T7 which was accepted as the 90 mm M3. The test firing of the M3 took place on an M10 tank destroyer in early 1943. The M3 gun was used on the M36 tank destroyer, and the T26 (later, M26) Pershing tank. The M3 fired an M82 APC shot with a muzzle velocity of 2,650 ft/s (810 m/s). However, both the muzzle velocity of the standard M3 gun and the quality of the steel used in the M82 APC (armor-piercing capped) shot, while comparable to the 8.8 cm KwK 36 L/56 mounted on the Tiger I, were inferior to the Tiger II's KwK 43 L/71 8.8 cm main gun firing its standard APCBC (armor-piercing capped ballistic cap) shot used by German forces, with the result that the former's penetration fell far short of the standard projectile fired by that German tank. As a result, US ordnance provided some T26/M26 tank crews with the 90 mm HVAP (high-velocity, armor-piercing) tungsten penetrator sub-caliber projectile with a muzzle velocity of 3,350 ft/s (1,020 m/s), or the T33 AP with a re-heat-treated projectile with ballistic windshield and a muzzle velocity of 2,800 ft/s (850 m/s). The HVAP could compete with the KwK 43's penetration performance when firing standard APCBC, but tungsten ammunition was always in short supply.

==== Ammunition (M3 gun) ====
- M71 HE – 23.29 lb (10.56 kg) (projectile)
- M77 AP – 23.40 lb (10.61 kg) (projectile)
- M82 APC – 24.11 lb (10.94 kg) (projectile)

==== Performance (M3 gun) ====
Calculated penetration at range (90 degrees) using 50% success criteria.
Ammo	Muzzle velocity (m/s)	Penetration (mm)										
Ammo	Muzzle velocity (m/s)	100 m	250 m	500 m	750 m	1,000 m	1,250 m	1,500 m	1,750 m	2,000 m	2,500 m	3,000 m
M77 AP versus FHA	823 m/s (2,700 ft/s)	168	159	146	134	122	112	102	94	86	72	60
M77 AP versus RHA	823 m/s (2,700 ft/s)	188	179	163	150	137	125	115	105	96	81	68
M82 APC versus FHA	808 m/s (2,650 ft/s)	151	150	147	144	140	135	131	127	123	115	107
M82 APC versus RHA	808 m/s (2,650 ft/s)	164	156	150	143	137	131	125	119	114	104	92
Late M82 APC versus RHA	853 m/s (2,800 ft/s)	169	168	164	157	151	144	140	136	132	123	116
Late M82 APC versus FHA	853 m/s (2,800 ft/s)	161	159	155	151	147	144	138	133	127	115	104
T33 AP versus RHA	853 m/s (2,800 ft/s)	206	201	193	185	178	170	164	157	150	139	128
T30E16 HVAP	1,018 m/s (3,340 ft/s)	306	295	278	262	246	232	218	205	193	171	151

=== 90 mm gun T8 ===
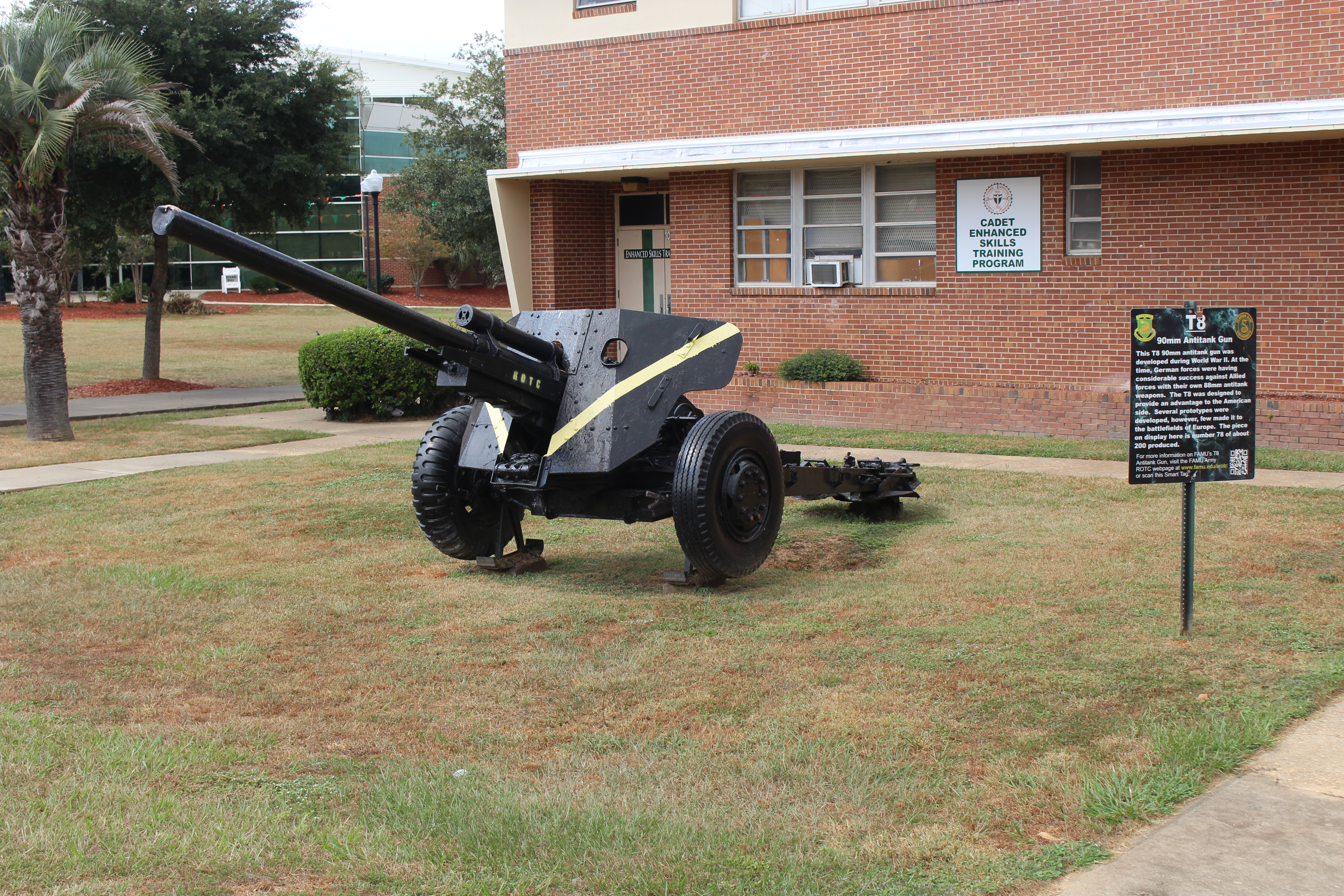
90 mm Anti-tank gun T8 in front of Florida Agricultural and Mechanical University, Tallahassee, Leon County, Florida.

An unsuccessful anti-tank variant was the T8 gun on the T5 carriage. The gun was an M1 with the recoil mechanism from the M2A1 105 mm howitzer. The combination of the 90mm gun and the T5 carriage was very long, so the trails of the carriage could be folded back to reduce their length, while the gun could rotate by 180 degrees so the barrel was facing back over the trails when being towed. However trials in January 1944 showed that this design didn’t work. A more conventional carriage T5E1 was designed, but this failed trials in June 1944. Finally the T5E2 passed its trials, ready to be used on a batch of 600 guns that had been ordered.

An alternative AT gun to the T8 was developed, the 90mm T9 gun, which had an unorthodox carriage in which the shield formed the basic member and the trail legs were hinged to the top corners; the legs stretched rearwards for firing and could be folded forward to lie alongside the barrel for towing. This design was worked on through 1944 and 1945 but without reaching a serviceable result.

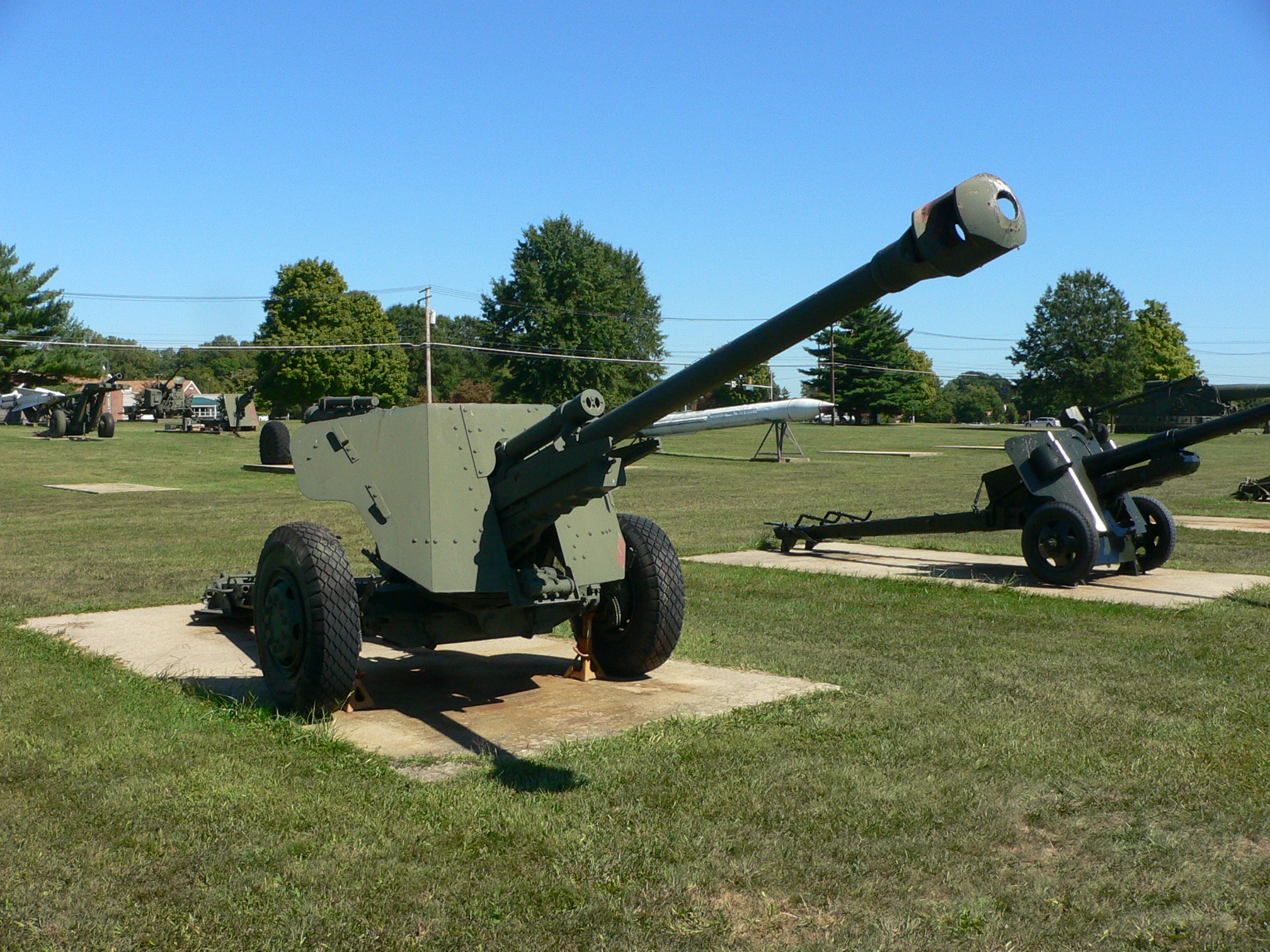
An experimental 90 mm T25 anti-tank gun.

The 90mm T8 gun on T5E2 carriage was classified as limited standard on 7 September 1944. The first three T8s were completed in 1944 and the entire rune of 200 by June 1945. Only one actually reached Europe during the war, with the Zebra mission, which took a number of experimental weapons to the front (including the T26E3 Pershing). However by this point towed anti-tank guns had been discredited and there is no record that the T8 ever saw any combat.

After the war the 90mm gun was used by the anti-tank batteries of the Airborne Divisions, even though they were too large to be carried in any of the available aircraft. They were removed from service in the early 1950s.

An improved version of the T8 was produced, the T25 gun, which had a muzzle brake. But this seemed to be an experimental prototype.

Eventually a version of the T8 with the T20E1 gun and T15 carriage was tested; this led to the 105 mm anti-tank gun T8.

=== 90 mm gun T15 ===
Because the standard fifteen-and-a-half foot long M3 90 mm main tank gun proved incapable of penetrating the heaviest frontal armor of the heaviest German tanks such as the Tiger II tank and the rarer Jagdtiger tank destroyer variant, a number of improved versions of the M3 were developed, including the T14 which included a standard muzzle brake and the T15 series. The 90 mm T15E1 L/73, with its 21 ft (6.4 m) long barrel, was designed and developed as an AT gun that could match or surpass the performance of the 8.8 cm KwK43 L/71 cannon, the famous long 88 on the Tiger II.

Two versions of the T15 were made: the T15E1 with single-piece ammunition and the T15E2 with two-piece ammunition.

By mid-March 1945, a T26E1 pilot was equipped with the 90 mm T15E1 and was sent to Europe in a ''trial by combat''. It was given to the 3rd Armor Division where it was enhanced with additional armor plates. Its gun was fired in anger on only one occasion, on 4 April 1945, where it engaged and destroyed a German armored vehicle, probably a Tiger I or Panther, at a range of 4,500 ft (1,400 m) during the fighting along the Weser River. According to the memoirs of John P. Irwin, it knocked out a King Tiger in Dessau as well as a Panzer IV and a Panther. However, the Tiger II claim is disputed by historians on the grounds that the nearest unit known to be equipped with Tiger IIs was 70 miles from Dessau on the date when the kill was claimed.

Near the end of World War II, more experimental versions of the 90 mm gun were tested including the higher-velocity T18 and T19 main guns. The T19 was a T18 modified in an attempt to reduce barrel wear. Other versions included the T21, which was intended for wheeled vehicles, and the T22, which used the breech from the standard 105 mm M2 howitzer. The T21 and T22 were designed to use larger powder charges. None of these versions entered service.

In the post-World War II era, development of the T15 continued redesignated as the T54, which used a slightly shorter and fatter propellent casing than that of the T15E1. The T54 served as the main gun on the M26E1 Pershing.

==== Ammunition ====
The T15 90 mm L/73 anti-tank gun utilized many types of armor piercing ammunition.

- T43 APBC: A solid shot, it was a modified T33 for use by the T15. It had a muzzle velocity of 3,200 ft/s (980 m/s) and therefore increased penetration capabilities. It could punch through 4 in (100 mm) of armor angled at 60°(from vertical) up to about 1,300 ft (400 m).
- T41 APCBC: Modified M82 projectile of the M3 cannon, fired at a much higher velocity of 3,200 ft/s, than the normal 2,670 ft/s. It could defeat up to 8.5 in (220 mm) of vertical armor at 30 ft (9.1 m).
- T44 HVAP: Modified M304(T30E16) for use out of the T15. Muzzle velocity of 3,750 ft/s (1,140 m/s). Maximum penetration of 15 in (380 mm) of vertical armor at 30 ft.
- T50 APCBC: An M82 projectile with increased nose hardness and overall better design. Same muzzle velocity 3,200 ft/s, but increased penetration, equal to the KwK43. 9.1–9.3 in (231–236 mm) against vertical armor at point-blank range.

==== Performance ====
Ammunition type	Muzzle velocity (m/s)	H.E. filler	Penetration (mm) PB (10yards)	0° 1,000 yards	0° 2,000 yards
T43 APBC	975	Solid shot			
T41 APCBC(M82)	975	140g explosive D.	216 mm	190 mm	175 mm
T50 APCBC	975	140g explosive D.	235 mm	~205 mm	~180 mm
T44 HVAP	1,143	Solid shot	373 mm	302 mm	241 mm

== Further developments ==
In 1948 an improved version of the M3A1, designated as the T119, was designed to be used on the T42 (and later M47 Patton) and had a higher muzzle velocity using new ammunition loaded to produce higher chamber pressures. The new ammunition had a slightly longer shoulder to prevent accidental chambering in the older M3 variants. The T119 was backwards compatible with the ammunition used on the M3A1. Upon standardization of the M47 in 1951, the T119E1 version was redesignated as the 90 mm gun M36.

The lightweight variant of the T119, designated as the T139 and standardized as the 90 mm gun M41, equipped the M48 Patton tanks used in the Vietnam War. The M41 with a modified recoil system was mounted as the 90 mm gun M54 on the M56 Scorpion anti-tank vehicle. This gun was found to be inadequate and incapable of penetrating modern armor, requiring a stop gap of HEAT-FS shells to be utilized until the 105mm L7 derivative could become more prevalent.

== Coast artillery ==
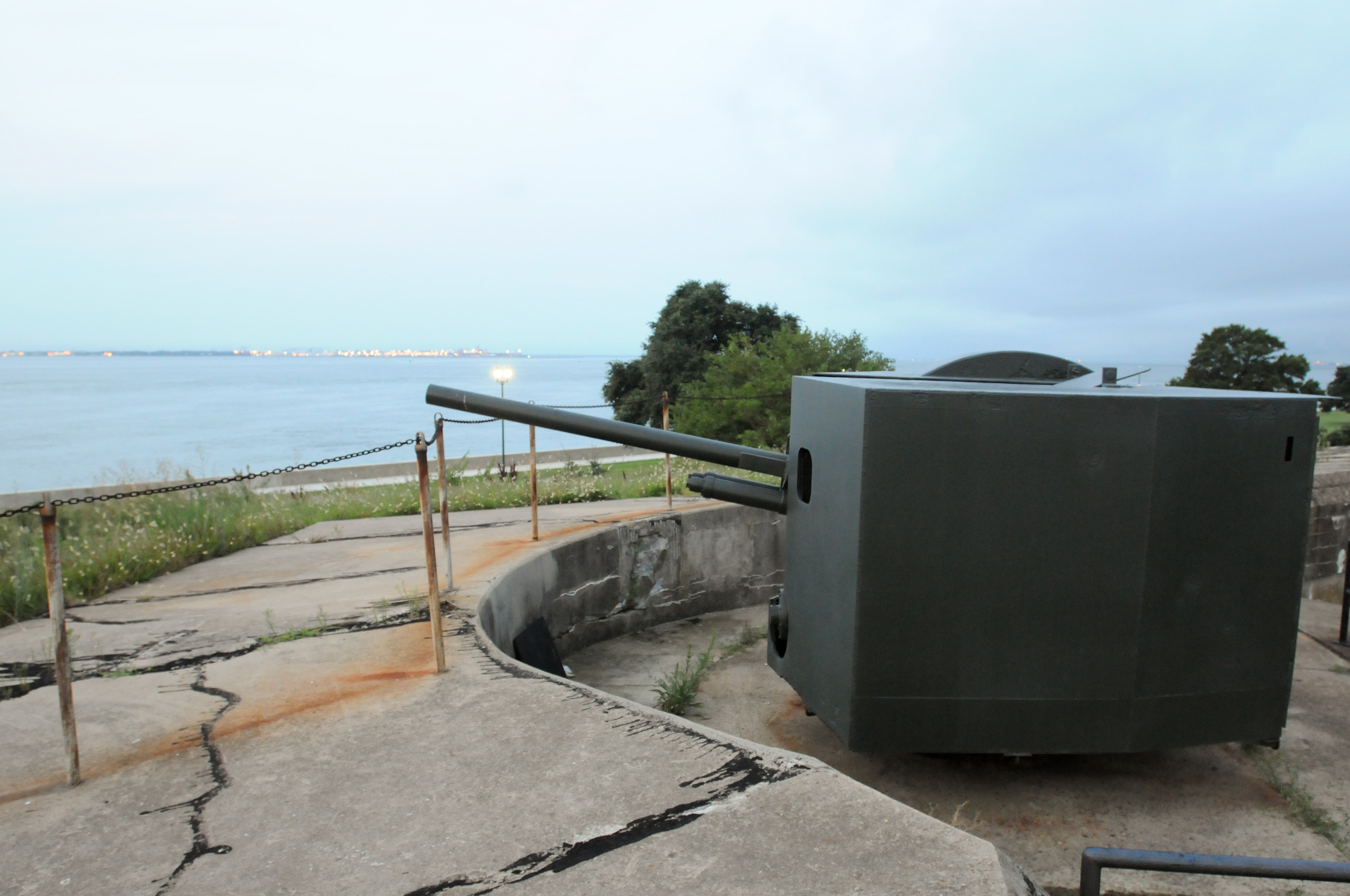
90 mm M1 gun on T3/M3 seacoast mount at Battery Parrott, Fort Monroe, Virginia

During World War II the Coast Artillery Corps adopted the 90 mm M1 to supplement or replace aging three-inch guns in harbor defense commands in CONUS and US territories. The guns were organized in anti-motor torpedo boat (AMTB) batteries, typically with four 90 mm guns and two 37 mm or 40 mm AA guns each. Typically two of the 90 mm guns were on T3/M3 fixed mounts and two were on towed M1A1 or M2 mounts, with the 37 mm or 40 mm weapons on single towed mounts. The T3/M3 mount was designed for anti-surface or anti-aircraft fire. Emplacements for at least 90 batteries of two fixed guns each, plus mobile weapons, were constructed in CONUS, Panama, Alaska, Hawaii, Puerto Rico, and elsewhere in 1943.

== Variants ==
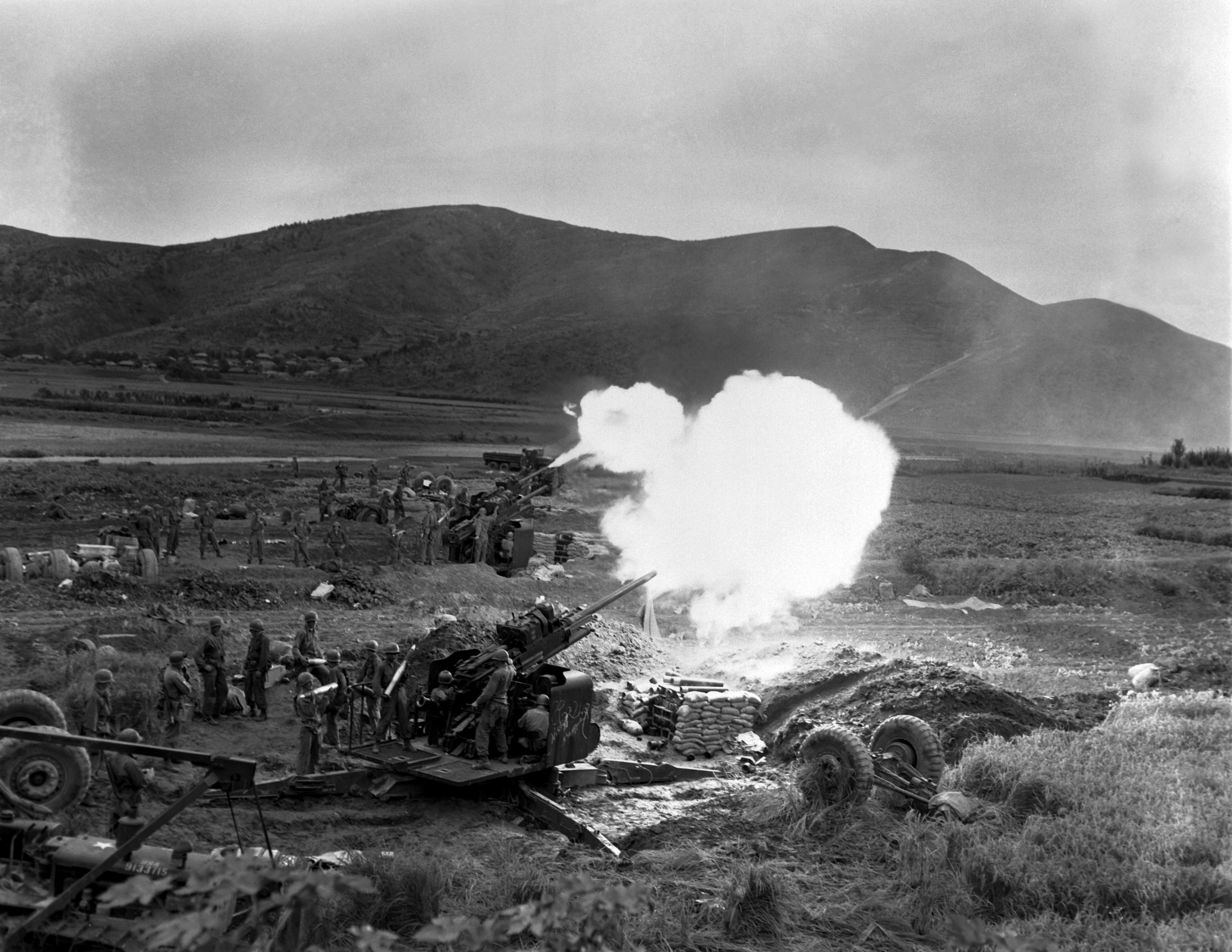
90 mm guns M2, Korea

=== M1 ===
- Towed anti-aircraft gun. Approved for service in 1940.
- Fixed on T3/M3 mount for coastal artillery service

=== M1A1 ===
Towed anti-aircraft gun. Production began in 1940. It featured the M8A1 spring rammer. Its rate of fire was 20 rounds per minute.

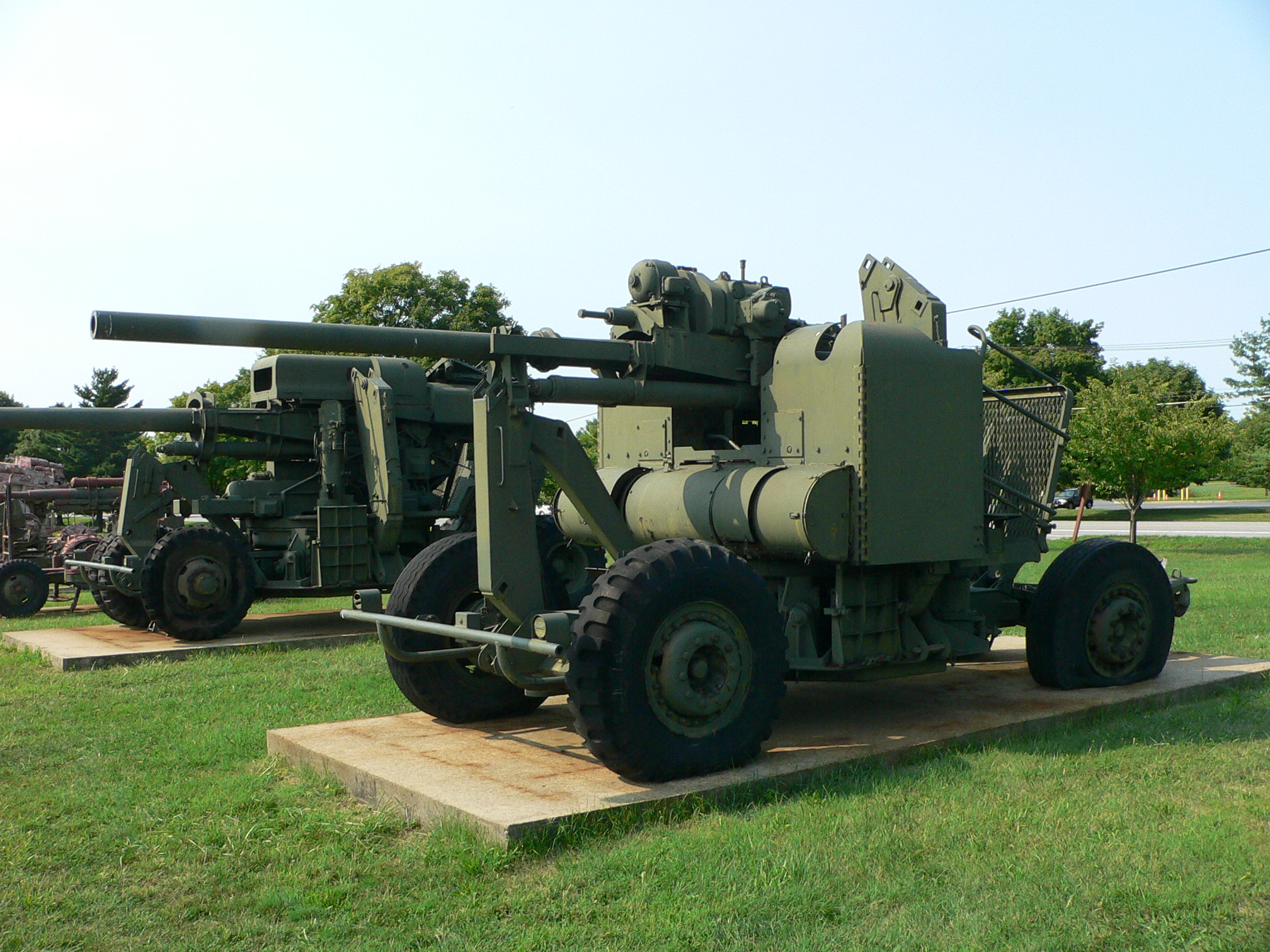
M2 in the United States Army Ordnance Museum

=== M2 ===
A complete redesign to make the gun dual role, functioning as an anti-tank gun as well as an anti-aircraft gun. The ammunition feed was upgraded and an automatic fuze setter-rammer, the M20, was added. This enabled the rate of fire to reach up to 24 rounds per minute. Elevation was improved with the gun able to depress to −10 degrees. To protect the crew, a large metal shield was added. The M2 was the standard weapon by 13 May 1943. From the march, it could fire from its wheels in three minutes and, from a fully emplaced position, in seven minutes. In 1944, the weapon was enhanced with the addition of proximity fused shells.

=== M3 ===
A tank-mounted anti-tank version of the gun. It was used to equip the M36 tank destroyer and the M26 Pershing tank. It is also known as the 90 mm L/53.

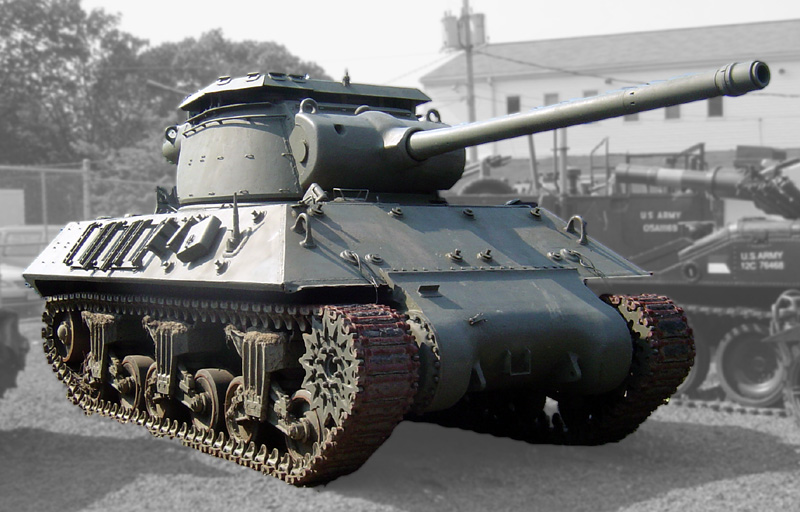
An M36 tank destroyer with the 90 mm gun

==== M3A1 ====
M3 gun with single baffle muzzle brake and bore evacuator, used on M46 Patton and early versions of the M48 Patton tanks and refurbished M36 tank destroyers during the Korean War.

== Surviving examples ==
- One AAA at Fort Irwin NTC, California, post museum
- One, possibly M1, Travis AFB, Fairfield, California, near the entrance to the skeet range
- One AAA at CFB Borden, Ontario, Canada
- One AAA at Labelle, Quebec, Canada
- One AAA at Sangudo, Alberta, Canada.
- One AAA at Whycocomagh, Nova Scotia, Canada.
- Two AAA at CFB Shilo, Manitoba, Canada, RCA Museum
- One AAA at Shilo, Manitoba, Canada (private collection)
- One AAA at Lemberg, Saskatchewan, Canada (private collection)
- One AAA at Colwood, British Columbia, Canada, Fort Rodd Hill
- One at Savannah, Georgia, National Guard Fairgrounds
- One at Arundel, Quebec, Canada, Legion Hall
- One AAA at Sault Ste. Marie, Ontario, Canada
- One AAA M2 at Fort Sill, Oklahoma, US Army Air Defense Artillery Museum.
- One AAA M1A1 at Fort Sill, Oklahoma, US Army Air Defense Artillery Museum.
- One AAA M2A2 at Fort Sill, Oklahoma, US Army Air Defense Artillery Museum
- One AAA M1A1 at Fort Sill, Oklahoma, 31st ADA Brigade
- One AAA M1A1 at US Veterans Memorial Museum, Huntsville, AL
- One AAA at Broadalbin, New York.
- One AAA at Roswell, New Mexico
- One AAA at Greenville, South Carolina
- One AAA at Anderson, South Carolina, VFW post
- One AAA at Deming, New Mexico, Deming Luna Mimbres Museum
- One AAA at Sainte-Marie-du-Mont, Manche, France, Utah Beach D-Day Museum. This gun belonged to the 116th AAA Gun Battalion and was lost in the Channel 6 June 1944. The gun was recovered by locals after the war.
- One AAA M1A3 (built 1954) at Raton, New Mexico
- One AAA M1A1 at Halifax, Nova Scotia, Royal Artillery Park
- One AAA M1A1 at Fort Bliss, Texas, Fort Bliss Museum
- One AAA M1A1 at Linthicum, Maryland, National Electronics Museum
- Two Anti/Tank T-8 at U.S. Army Armor & Cavalry Collection, Fort Benning, Georgia.
- One M1A3 at Reidsville, Georgia, National Guard Armory
- One M1A3 at Campinas, São Paulo, Brazil, located at an open museum which belongs to the 11ª Brigade of the Brazilian Army
- One seacoast M1 (No. 6931 Chevrolet) on barbette, carriage Model T3, at Battery Parrott, Fort Monroe, Virginia
- One seacoast M1 on barbette, carriage Model T3 (shield scrapped), Eareckson Air Station (formerly Shemya AFB), Shemya, Alaska, outside Bldg 600
- One seacoast on barbette, carriage Model T3, at San Pedro, California, Fort MacArthur Military Museum, (the museum has several barrels and was restoring at least one weapon as of October 2014)
- Two AAA M1A1s in Moscow, Russia, Museum of the Great Patriotic War, supplied as Lend-Lease during WWII
- One 90 mm M2A1 at Tucson, Arizona, Pima Air & Space Museum
- One M1A3 at Historical Military Museum of Cartagena (Spain)
- One at the Kalmthoutse Heide, Belgium
- One at Ft Miles Artillery Museum, Delaware
- One at Mémorial du Débarquement et de la Libération en Provence, Toulon, France

=== AT Guns ===
- One 90 mm T-8 AT gun at Fort Bragg in Fayetteville in Cumberland County, North Carolina

== See also ==
- 184th AAA Battalion (United States)
- Fire-control system
- List of U.S. Army weapons by supply catalog designation
- Rangekeeper
- Seacoast defense in the United States

=== Weapons of comparable role, performance and era ===
- 8.8 cm Flak 18/36/37/41: contemporary German anti-aircraft gun
- 8.8 cm KwK 36: contemporary German tank gun, mounted on Tiger I Tanks
- Cannone da 90/53: contemporary Italian anti-aircraft gun
- QF 3.7-inch AA gun: contemporary British anti-aircraft gun, firing a 28 pounds (13 kg) shell
- 85 mm air defense gun M1939 (52-K): contemporary Soviet anti-aircraft gun
