= 7.5 cm kanon PL vz. 37 =

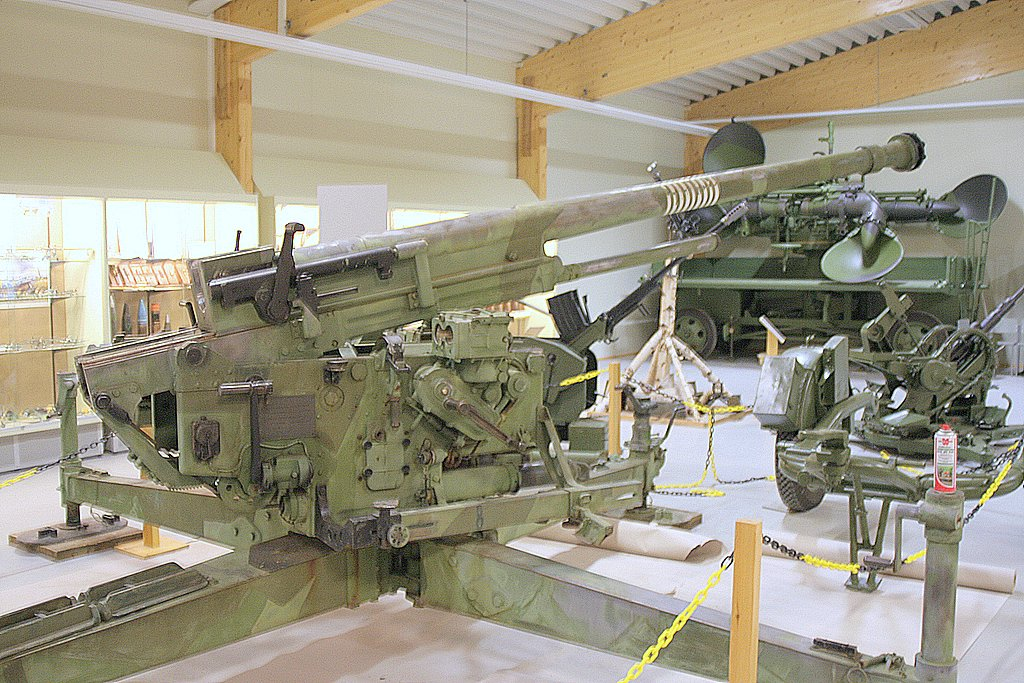
- Type: Anti-aircraft gun
- Place of origin: Czechoslovakia

Service history
- In service: 1937–1950?
- Used by: Czechoslovakia; Finland; Nazi Germany; Kingdom of Italy
- Wars: World War II

Production history
- Designer: Škoda Works
- Manufacturer: Škoda Works
- Produced: 1937–39?

Specifications
- Mass: 2,800 kilograms (6,200 lb)
- Barrel length: 3.65 metres (10 ft) L/48.7
- Shell: 75 x 657mm R
- Shell weight: 6.5 kilograms (14 lb) (HE)
- Caliber: 75 millimetres (3.0 in)
- Breech: semi-automatic vertical sliding-block
- Recoil: Hydro-pneumatic
- Carriage: Cruciform
- Elevation: 0° to +85°
- Traverse: 360°
- Rate of fire: 10–15 rpm
- Muzzle velocity: 750–775 metres per second (2,460–2,540 ft/s)
- Effective firing range: 4,000–6,000 m (13,000–20,000 ft) slant range
- Maximum firing range: 9,200 metres (30,200 ft) vertical ceiling
- Filling weight: 640 grams (23 oz)

The 7.5 cm kanon PL vz. 37 (Anti-aircraft Gun Model 37) was a Czech anti-aircraft gun used in World War II.

== History ==
Those weapons captured after the German occupation of Czechoslovakia in March 1939 were taken into Wehrmacht service as the 7.5 cm Flak M 37(t) (Note: There could also be the 7.5 cm Flak 37(t).)or 7.5 cm Flak Skoda (t). The Germans sold many of them to Italy where they were designated as the Cannone da 75/49. Surviving guns were taken back into German service after Italy's surrender in 1943. Twenty were sold to the Finns in November 1940. Twelve were in Luftwaffe service between April and September 1944.

== Description ==
The gun had a semi-automatic, vertical sliding-block breech that automatically ejected the cartridge case after firing, but had to be hand-loaded for the next shot. It had a standard hydro-pneumatic recoil system and a muzzle brake. It could fire a 6.5 kilograms (14 lb) armor-piercing shell for direct fire. It was intended for motor towing as it rode on a two-axle carriage with pneumatic wheels, but could be towed by horses if necessary. The side legs of the cruciform mount folded for transport.
