= Cannone da 75/46 C.A. modello 34 =

Cannone da 75/46
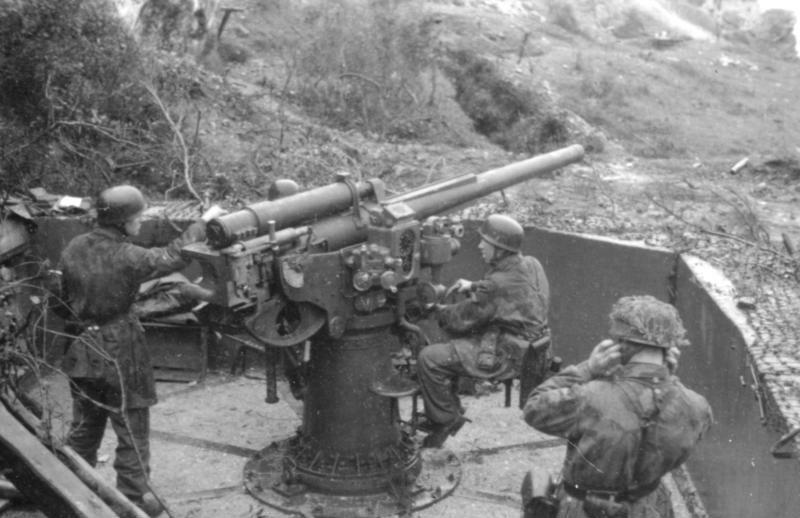
- Cannone da 75/46 C.A. modello 40 at Mount Circeo, 1943.
- Type: Anti-aircraft gun
- Place of origin: Italy

Service history
- Used by: Italy; Nazi Germany
- Wars: World War II

Production history
- Designed: 1934
- No. built: Modello 34: 226; Modello 40: 45
- Variants: Cannone da 75/46 C.A. modello 34; Cannone da 75/46 C.A. modello 40

Specifications
- Mass: Travelling: 4,405 kg (9,711 lb); Combat: 3,300 kg (7,300 lb)
- Barrel length: 3.45 m (11 ft 4 in) L/46
- Width: 1.8 m (5 ft 11 in)
- Height: 3.45 m (11 ft 4 in)
- Shell: 75 x 580 mmR
- Shell weight: 6.5 kg (14 lb 5 oz) (HE)
- Caliber: 75 mm (3.0 in)
- Breech: Horizontal sliding-wedge
- Recoil: Hydro-pneumatic
- Carriage: Two-wheeled carriage with folding cruciform outriggers.
- Elevation: –2° to +90°
- Traverse: 360°
- Muzzle velocity: 750 m/s (2,500 ft/s)
- Maximum firing range: 13,000 metres (43,000 ft); 8,500 metres (27,900 ft) Max ceiling

The Cannone da 75/46 C.A. modello 34 was a mobile Italian anti-aircraft gun used during World War II. The designation means it had a caliber of 75 mm, the barrel was 46 caliber-lengths long and it was accepted in service in 1934. The Cannone da 75/46 C.A. modello 40 was a fixed anti-aircraft gun version.

== History ==
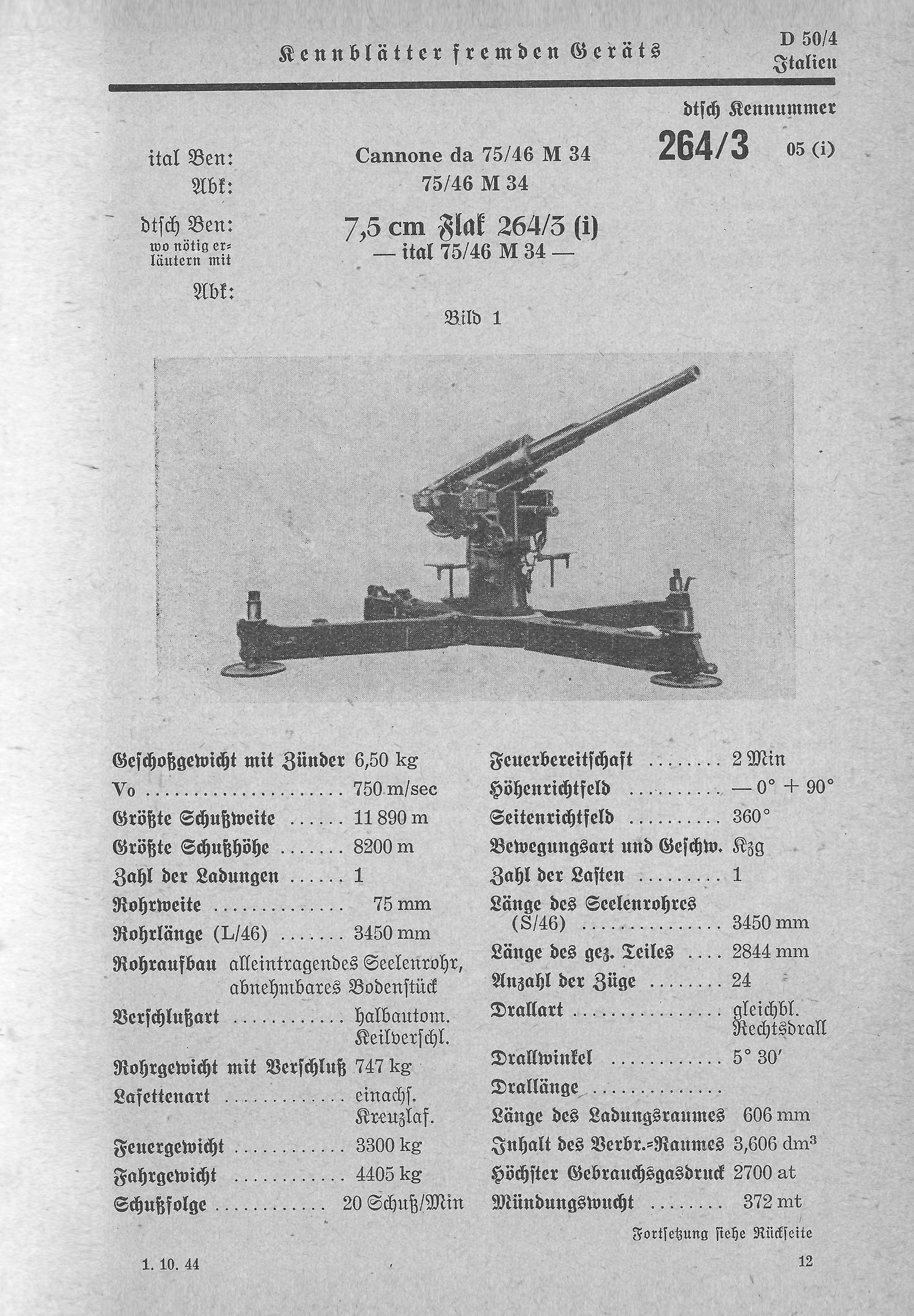
Datasheet: 7,5 cm Flak 264/3(i) Cannone da 75/46 M 34 scan of Dienstvorschrift: Kennblätter fremden Geräts D 50/4

The gun shows the influence of contemporary Vickers designs such as the Model 1931, and was a sound and orthodox design. As production was both late in starting and slow in being carried out, by 1942 only 226 of the 240 ordered had been delivered. This meant that older, obsolete AA guns had to be kept in service even though their efficacy was minimal, and also that its production continued in parallel with the newer and better performing Cannone da 90/53. In addition to the mobile modello 34, a static mount, called the Cannone da 75/46 C.A. modello 40 was produced. Production of the model was also slow and only 45 of the 240 ordered were delivered.

Assigned both to field units and to batteries protecting the Italian territory, it was also used on the Eastern front and in the Tunisian Campaign as an anti-tank gun (in which capacity it was also fitted to the Semovente da 75/46 self-propelled gun). Its performance was considered good in both roles, especially in the latter, with its AP shell that could pierce 90 millimetres (3.5 in) of armor at 500 metres (550 yd)), but it was never available in numbers.

After the Italian Armistice, the Wehrmacht captured and employed some of these guns, with modello 34 guns receiving the designation 7.5 cm Flak 264/3(i), while modello 40 guns were given the designation 7.5 cm Flak 264/4(i)

== See also ==
- Italian Army equipment in World War II
- Cannone da 90/53 - another contemporary Italian anti-aircraft gun

== Bibliography ==
- Artillery by Chris Chant, published by Amber Books, ISBN 1-84509-248-1
- The Encyclopedia of Weapons of World War II, Barnes and Noble Ltd. (1998), ISBN 0-7607-1022-8
