= Cannone da 75/27 A.V. =

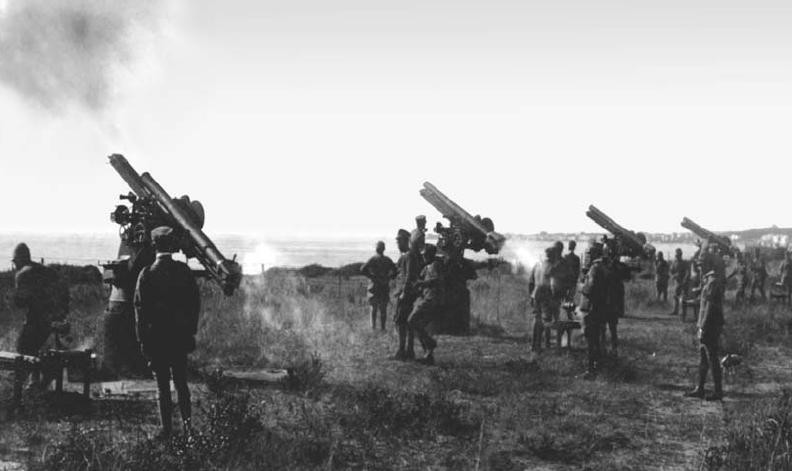
- A Battery of 75/27 A.V. at the test range in Nettuno.
- Type: Anti-aircraft gun
- Place of origin: Italy

Service history
- In service: 1917–1943
- Used by: Italy; Nazi Germany
- Wars: World War I World War II

Production history
- Designer: Ansaldo
- Designed: 1916
- Manufacturer: Ansaldo
- Variants: See variants

Specifications
- Mass: 1.9 t (1.9 long tons; 2.1 short tons)
- Barrel length: 2.025 m (6 ft 8 in) L/27
- Shell: Fixed QF 75 x 185mm R
- Shell weight: 6.5 kg (14 lb 5 oz)
- Caliber: 75 mm (3 in)
- Action: Semi-automatic
- Breech: Horizontal sliding-wedge
- Recoil: Hydro-spring
- Carriage: Static center pivot mount
- Elevation: –5° to +80°
- Traverse: 360°
- Rate of fire: 15 rpm
- Muzzle velocity: 510 m/s (1,700 ft/s)
- Effective firing range: 5,500 m (18,000 ft)
- Maximum firing range: 6,000 m (20,000 ft)

The Cannone da 75/27 A.V. was an anti-aircraft gun developed in Italy during World War I that also saw service during World War II.

== History ==
The Cannone da 75/27 A.V. (Anti Velivolo, Anti-Aircraft) cannon was privately developed by Ansaldo to supply an anti-aircraft gun to the Regia Esercito. It was used during the First World War for the defense of metropolitan areas by the Regia Esercito. During the Second World War it was assigned to coastal defense, anti-aircraft, and second line units.

== Description ==
The Cannone da 75/27 A.V. used the barrel and hydro-spring recoil mechanism from the Cannone da 75/27 modello 06, a license-built version of the Krupp Kanone M 1906 field gun, to speed up production and it used the same Fixed QF 75 x 185mm R ammunition. The barrel consisted of a rifled liner with 28 left-handed grooves, and an external jacket, it was 2.025 m (6 ft 8 in) L/27 long and weighed 346 kg (763 lb) including the semi-automatic horizontal sliding-wedge breech. The breech closed automatically when a projectile was fed into the chamber and after firing the shell casing was ejected and the breech was held open for the next round. The cannon was mounted on a static center pivot mount with -5° to + 80° of elevation and 360° of traverse.

== Variants ==
- Autocannone da 75/27 A.V. su autocarro semiblindato Lancia 1Z - was a self-propelled anti-aircraft gun with a new pedestal mount and new recoil mechanism that was mounted on the chassis of a Lancia 1Z truck. In 1915 these formed the basis of Italy's first truck-mounted artillery. Eventually, twenty-seven batteries of five guns were formed during World War I.

== See also ==
- Cannone da 75/27 C.K.
