= Structure of the Italian Army in 1984 =

On March 1, 1984, the Italian Institute for Disarmament, Development and Peace (Istituto di ricerche per il disarmo, lo sviluppo e la pace (IRDISP) in Rome (a think tank of the Radical Party) published the entire Italian Army order of battle (OrBat) down to company level – this was justified by the radical party as one of its core demands was total disarmament of Europe, even though the data which was published was top secret. The Radical Party dissolved in 1989 (its parliamentarians had passed along the data) and the IRDISP followed suit in 1990. But Radio Radicale has survived, and the OrBat can still be found today on the homepage of the radio.

OrBat published by Istituto di ricerche per il disarmo, lo sviluppo e la pace (IRDISP) in Rome on March 1, 1984.

== Army General Staff ==
=== 3rd Army Corps ===
- 3rd Army Corps, in Milan:
  - 3rd Army Corps Command Battalion, in Milan
  - Corps Artillery Command, in Milan
    - Horse Artillery Regiment, in Milan
      - Command Battery, in Milan
      - 1st Self-propelled Group, Horse Artillery Regiment (M109 155 mm self-propelled howitzers), in Milan
      - 2nd Self-propelled Group, Horse Artillery Regiment (Reserve) (M109 155mm self-propelled howitzers), in Milan
      - 3rd Self-propelled Group, Horse Artillery Regiment (M109 155mm self-propelled howitzers), in Cremona
      - 3rd Battery, 30th Artillery Specialists Group "Brianza", in Milan
  - 4th Infantry Battalion "Guastalla" (Recruits Training), in Asti
  - 72nd Infantry Battalion "Puglie" (Recruits Training), in Albenga
  - 3rd Engineer Battalion "Lario", in Pavia
  - 3rd Signal Battalion "Spluga", in Milan
  - 3rd Maneuver Logistic Battalion, in Milan
  - 3rd Army Corps Light Aviation Command, at Bresso Air Base
    - 23rd Reconnaissance Helicopter Squadrons Group "Eridano", at Bresso Air Base (AB-206 helicopters)
    - 53rd Medium Helicopter Squadrons Group "Cassiopea", at Padua Air Base (AB-205 helicopters)
  - Motorized Brigade "Cremona", in Turin
    - Command and Signal Unit "Cremona", in Turin
    - 1st Armored Squadrons Group "Nizza Cavalleria", in Pinerolo (M47 Patton tanks and VCC-2 armored personnel carriers)
    - 21st Motorized Infantry Battalion "Alfonsine", in Alessandria
    - 22nd Infantry Battalion "Primaro" (Recruits Training), in Fossano
    - 50th Motorized Infantry Battalion "Parma" (Reserve), in Fossano
    - 157th Motorized Infantry Battalion "Liguria", in Novi Ligure
    - 7th Field Artillery Group "Adria", in Turin (M114 155 mm howitzers)
    - Logistic Battalion "Cremona", in Turin
    - Anti-tank Company "Cremona", in Pinerolo
    - Engineer Company "Cremona", in Pinerolo

==== Armored Division "Centauro" ====
- Armored Division "Centauro", in Novara
  - 15th Reconnaissance Squadrons Group "Cavalleggeri di Lodi", in Lenta (Leopard 1A2 main battle tanks and VCC-2 armored personnel carriers)
  - 26th Infantry Battalion "Bergamo" (Recruits Training), in Diano Castello
  - 131st Engineer Battalion "Ticino", in Bellinzago Novarese
  - 231st Signal Battalion "Sempione", in Novara
  - Logistic Battalion "Centauro", in Novara
  - 46th Reconnaissance Helicopter Squadrons Group "Sagittario", at Vercelli Air Base (AB-206 helicopters)
  - Division Artillery Command, in Vercelli
    - 131st Heavy Field Artillery Group "Vercelli", in Vercelli (FH70 155 mm howitzers)
    - 205th Heavy Field Artillery Group "Lomellina", in Vercelli (FH70 155 mm towed howitzers)
    - Artillery Specialists Group "Centauro", in Vercelli
    - 11th Light Anti-aircraft Artillery Group "Falco", in Vercelli
  - 3rd Mechanized Brigade "Goito" in Milan
    - Command and Signal Unit "Goito", in Milan
    - 4th Tank Battalion "M.O. Passalacqua", in Solbiate Olona (Leopard 1A2 main battle tanks)
    - 6th Bersaglieri Battalion "Palestro", in Turin (VCC-2 armored personnel carriers)
    - 10th Bersaglieri Battalion "Bezzecca", in Solbiate Olona (VCC-2 armored personnel carriers)
    - 18th Bersaglieri Battalion "Poggio Scanno", in Milan (VCC-2 armored personnel carriers)
    - 3rd Self-propelled Field Artillery Group "Pastrengo", in Vercelli (M109 155 mm self-propelled howitzers)
    - Logistic Battalion "Goito", in Monza
    - Anti-tank Company, in Turin
    - Engineer Company, in Novara
  - 31st Armored Brigade "Curtatone", in Bellinzago Novarese
    - Command and Signal Unit "Curtatone", in Bellinzago Novarese
    - 1st Tank Battalion "M.O. Cracco", in Bellinzago Novarese (Leopard 1A2 main battle tanks)
    - 101st Tank Battalion "M.O. Zappalà", in Bellinzago Novarese (Leopard 1A2 main battle tanks)
    - 28th Bersaglieri Battalion "Oslavia", in Bellinzago Novarese (VCC-2 armored personnel carriers)
    - 9th Self-propelled Field Artillery Group "Brennero", in Vercelli (M109 155 mm self-propelled howitzers)
    - Logistic Battalion "Curtatone", in Bellinzago Novarese
    - Anti-tank Company "Curtatone", in Bellinzago Novarese
    - Engineer Company "Curtatone", in Novara
  - Mechanized Brigade "Legnano", in Bergamo
    - Command and Signal Unit "Legnano", in Bergamo
    - 20th Tank Battalion "M.O. Pentimalli", in Legnano (Leopard 1A2 main battle tanks)
    - 2nd Bersaglieri Battalion "Governolo", in Legnano (M113 armored personnel carriers)
    - 67th Mechanized Infantry Battalion "Montelungo", in Monza (M113 armored personnel carriers)
    - 68th Mechanized Infantry Battalion "Palermo", in Bergamo (M113 armored personnel carriers)
    - 11th Field Artillery Group "Monferrato", in Cremona (M114 155 mm howitzers)
    - Logistic Battalion "Legnano", in Presezzo
    - Anti-tank Company "Legnano", in Monza
    - Engineer Company "Legnano", in Bergamo

=== 4th Alpine Army Corps ===
- 4th Alpine Army Corps, in Bolzano:
  - 4th Alpine Army Corps Command Battalion, in Bolzano
  - Corps Artillery Command, in Bolzano
    - 4th Heavy Field Artillery Regiment, in Trento
      - Command Battery
      - 1st Group, 4th Heavy Field Artillery Regiment (FH70 155 mm howitzers)
      - 2nd Group, 4th Heavy Field Artillery Regiment (FH70 155mm towed howitzers)
    - 10th Self-propelled Field Artillery Group "Avisio", in Trento (M109 155 mm self-propelled howitzers),
    - 4th Artillery Specialists Group "Bondone", in Trento
  - 3rd Armored Squadrons Group "Savoia Cavalleria", in Merano (M47 Patton tanks and VCC-2 armored personnel carriers)
  - 2nd Mining Engineer Battalion "Iseo", in Bolzano
  - 4th Engineer Battalion "Orta", in Trento
  - 4th Signal Battalion "Gardena", in Bolzano
  - 4th Army Aviation Regiment "Altair", at Bolzano-San Giacomo Air Base
    - 24th Light Airplanes and Helicopter Squadrons Group "Orione", at Bolzano-San Giacomo Air Base (SM-1019 planes and AB-206 helicopters)
    - 34th Reconnaissance Helicopter Squadrons Group "Toro", at Venaria Reale Air Base and at Aosta-Pollein Air Base (AB-205 and AB-206 helicopters)
    - 44th Reconnaissance Helicopter Squadrons Group "Fenice", at Belluno Air Base (AB-205 and AB-206 helicopters)
    - 54th Medium Helicopter Squadrons Group "Cefeo", at Bolzano-San Giacomo Air Base (AB-205 helicopters)
  - 4th Maneuver Logistic Battalion, in Bolzano
  - 7th Armored Carabinieri Battalion "M.O. Petrucelli", in Laives (M47 Patton tanks and M113 armored personnel carriers)
  - 7th Signal Company, in Bassano
  - Alpini Paratroopers Company, in Eppan
  - Alpine Brigade "Cadore", in Belluno
    - Command and Signal Unit "Cadore", in Belluno
    - Alpini Battalion "Feltre", in Feltre
    - Alpini Battalion "Pieve di Cadore", in Tai di Cadore (68th Company based in Santo Stefano di Cadore, 75th Company in Pieve di Cadore)
    - Alpini Battalion "Belluno" (Recruits Training), in Belluno
    - Mountain Artillery Group "Lanzo", in Belluno (M56 105 mm pack howitzers)
    - Mountain Artillery Group "Agordo", in Bassano del Grappa (M114 155 mm howitzers)
    - Logistic Battalion "Cadore", in Belluno
    - Anti-tank Company "Cadore", in Belluno
    - Engineer Company "Cadore", in Belluno
  - Alpine Brigade "Julia", in Udine
    - Command and Signal Unit "Julia", in Udine
    - Alpini Battalion "Cividale", in Chiusaforte
    - Alpini Battalion "Gemona", in Tarvisio
    - Alpini Battalion "L'Aquila", in L'Aquila
    - Alpini Battalion "Tolmezzo", in Paluzza (6th Company based in Forni Avoltri)
    - Alpini Fortification Battalion "Val Tagliamento", in Tolmezzo (16x companies, over 2000 men in strength)
    - Alpini Battalion "Vicenza" (Recruits Training), in Codroipo (61st Company based in Teramo)
    - Mountain Artillery Group "Belluno", in Pontebba (M56 105 mm pack howitzers)
    - Mountain Artillery Group "Udine", in Tolmezzo (M56 105 mm pack howitzers)
    - Mountain Artillery Group "Conegliano", in Udine (M114 155 mm howitzers)
    - Logistic Battalion "Julia", in Udine
    - Anti-tank Company "Julia", in Cavazzo Carnico
    - Engineer Company "Julia", in Gemona
  - Alpine Brigade "Orobica", in Meran
    - Command and Signal Unit "Orobica", in Meran
    - Alpini Battalion "Morbegno", in Sterzing
    - Alpini Battalion "Tirano", in Mals
    - Alpini Battalion "Edolo" (Recruits Training), in Meran
    - Mountain Artillery Group "Bergamo", in Schlanders (M56 105 mm pack howitzers)
    - Mountain Artillery Group "Sondrio", in Sterzing (M114 155 mm howitzers)
    - Logistic Battalion "Orobica", in Meran
    - Anti-tank Company "Orobica", in Meran
    - Engineer Company "Orobica", in Meran
  - Alpine Brigade "Taurinense", in Turin
    - Command and Signal Unit "Taurinense", in Turin
    - Alpini Battalion "Aosta", in Aosta
    - Alpini Battalion "Saluzzo", in Borgo San Dalmazzo
    - Alpini Battalion "Susa", in Pinerolo
    - Alpini Battalion "Mondovì" (Recruits Training), in Cuneo
    - Mountain Artillery Group "Aosta", in Saluzzo (M114 155 mm howitzers)
    - Mountain Artillery Group "Pinerolo", in Susa (M56 105 mm pack howitzers)
    - Logistic Battalion "Taurinense", in Rivoli
    - Anti-tank Company "Taurinense", in Turin
    - Engineer Company "Taurinense", in Abbadia Alpina
  - Alpine Brigade "Tridentina", in Brixen
    - Command and Signal Unit "Tridentina", in Brixen
    - Alpini Battalion "Bassano", in Innichen
    - Alpini Battalion "Trento", in Welsberg
    - Alpini Fortification Battalion "Val Brenta", in Bruneck
    - Mountain Artillery Group "Asiago", in Toblach (M56 105 mm pack howitzers)
    - Mountain Artillery Group "Vicenza", in Elvas (M114 155 mm howitzers)
    - Logistic Battalion "Tridentina", in Vahrn
    - Anti-tank Company "Tridentina", in Bruneck
    - Engineer Company "Tridentina", in Brixen

=== 5th Army Corps ===
- 5th Army Corps, in Vittorio Veneto:
  - 5th Command Battalion, in Vittorio Veneto
  - 7th Infantry Battalion "Cuneo" (Recruits Training), in Udine
  - 48th Infantry Battalion "Ferrara" (Recruits Training), in Bari
  - 5th Army Light Aviation Grouping "Rigel", at Casarsa della Delizia Air Base
    - 25th Light Airplanes and Helicopter Squadrons Group "Cigno", at Casarsa della Delizia Air Base (AB-206 helicopters)
    - 55th Medium Helicopter Squadrons Group "Dragone", at Casarsa della Delizia Air Base (AB-205 helicopters)
  - 1st Mining Engineer Battalion "Garda", in Udine
  - 3rd Sapper Battalion "Verbano", in Udine
  - 5th Engineer Battalion "Bolsena", in Udine
  - 5th Signal Battalion "Rolle", in Sacile
  - 33rd Electronic Warfare Battalion "Falzarego", in Conegliano
  - 13th Armored Carabinieri Battalion "M.O. Gallo", in Gorizia (M47 Patton tanks and VCC-2 armored personnel carriers)
  - 3rd Missile Brigade "Aquileia", in Portogruaro
    - Command Battalion, in Portogruaro
    - 27th Heavy Self-propelled Artillery Regiment, in Udine
      - Command and Services Battery, in Udine
      - 1st Group, in Udine (M110 203 mm self-propelled howitzers)
      - 2nd Group, in San Bernardo-Udine (M110 203mm self-propelled howitzers)
    - 1st Heavy Artillery Group "Adige" (Disbanded 1983), in Verona (M115 203 mm howitzers)
    - 3rd Missile Artillery Group "Volturno", in Oderzo (HQ and 1st Battery) and Codogné (2nd and 3rd Battery) (MGM-52 Lance tactical ballistic missiles)
    - 9th Heavy Artillery Group "Rovigo", in Verona (M115 203 mm towed howitzers)
    - 13th Target Acquisition Group "Aquileia", in Verona
    - 13th Signal Battalion "Mauria", in Portogruaro
    - 13th Maneuver Logistic Battalion, in Portogruaro
    - 41st Artillery Specialists Group "Cordenons", in Pordenone
    - 92nd Infantry Battalion "Basilicata" (Recruits Training), in Foligno
      - 1st Fusilier Company "Aquileia", in Codogné
      - 2nd Fusilier Company "Aquileia", in Vicenza
      - 3rd Fusilier Company "Aquileia", in Oderzo
    - Engineer Company "Aquileia", in Vicenza
  - Trieste Troops Command, in Trieste
    - Command and Services Platoon, in Trieste
    - 1st Motorized Infantry Battalion "San Giusto", in Trieste (Included one mechanized company with M113 armored personnel carriers)
    - 43rd Motorized Infantry Battalion "Forlì" (Reserve), in Trieste
    - 255th Motorized Infantry Battalion "Veneto" (Reserve), in Trieste
    - 14th Field Artillery Group "Murge", in Trieste (M114 155 mm howitzers)
    - Recruits Training Company, in Trieste
    - Engineer Platoon, in Trieste
    - Signal Platoon, in Trieste
    - Provisions Supply Platoon, in Trieste
    - Logistics Base, in Muggia

==== Armored Division "Ariete" ====
- Armored Division "Ariete", in Pordenone
  - 19th Reconnaissance Squadrons Group "Cavalleggeri Guide", in Casarsa della Delizia (Leopard 1A2 main battle tanks and VCC-1 armored personnel carriers)
  - 14th Bersaglieri Battalion "Sernaglia" (Recruits Training), in Albenga
  - 16th Infantry Battalion "Savona" (Recruits Training), in Savona
  - 132nd Engineer Battalion "Livenza", in Motta di Livenza
  - 232nd Signal Battalion "Fadalto", in Casarsa della Delizia
  - Maneuver Logistic Battalion "Ariete", in Casarsa della Delizia
  - 49th Reconnaissance Helicopter Squadrons Group "Capricorno", in Casarsa della Delizia (AB-205)
  - Division Artillery Command, in Casarsa della Delizia
    - 108th Heavy Field Artillery Group "Cosseria", in Casarsa della Delizia (FH70 155 mm towed howitzers)
    - 132nd Heavy Field Artillery Group "Rovereto", in Casarsa della Delizia (FH70 155 mm towed howitzers)
    - Artillery Specialists Group "Ariete", in Casarsa della Delizia
    - 14th Light Anti-aircraft Artillery Group "Astore" (Reserve), in Casarsa della Delizia
  - 8th Mechanized Brigade "Garibaldi", in Pordenone
    - Command and Signal Unit "Garibaldi", in Pordenone
    - 7th Tank Battalion "M.O. Di Dio", in Vivaro (M60A1 main battle tanks)
    - 3rd Bersaglieri Battalion "Cernaia", in Pordenone (VCC-1 armored personnel carriers)
    - 11th Bersaglieri Battalion "Caprera", in Orcenico Superiore (VCC-1 armored personnel carriers)
    - 26th Bersaglieri Battalion "Castelfidardo", in Maniago (VCC-1 armored personnel carriers)
    - 19th Self-propelled Field Artillery Group "Rialto", in Sequals (M109 155 mm self-propelled howitzers)
    - Logistic Battalion "Garibaldi", in Pordenone
    - Anti-tank Company "Garibaldi", in Vivaro
    - Engineer Company "Garibaldi", in Orcenico Superiore
  - 32nd Armored Brigade "Mameli", in Tauriano
    - Command and Signal Unit "Mameli", in Tauriano
    - 3rd Tank Battalion "M.O. Galas", in Tauriano (M60A1 main battle tanks)
    - 5th Tank Battalion "M.O. Chiamenti", in Tauriano (M60A1 main battle tanks)
    - 23rd Bersaglieri Battalion "Castel di Borgo", in Tauriano (VCC-1 armored personnel carriers)
    - 12th Self-propelled Field Artillery Group "Capua", in Vacile (M109 155 mm self-propelled howitzers)
    - Logistic Battalion "Mameli", in Vacile
    - Anti-tank Company "Mameli", in Vacile
    - Engineer Company "Mameli", in Vacile
  - 132nd Armored Brigade "Manin", in Aviano
    - Command and Signal Unit "Manin", in Aviano
    - 8th Tank Battalion "M.O. Secchiaroli", in Aviano (M60A1 main battle tanks)
    - 10th Tank Battalion "M.O. Bruno", in Aviano (M60A1 main battle tanks)
    - 27th Bersaglieri Battalion "Jamiano", in Aviano (VCC-1 armored personnel carriers)
    - 20th Self-propelled Field Artillery Group "Piave", in Maniago (M109 155 mm self-propelled howitzers)
    - Logistic Battalion "Manin", in Maniago
    - Anti-tank Company "Manin", in Aviano
    - Engineer Company "Manin", in Maniago

==== Mechanized Division "Mantova" ====
- Mechanized Division "Mantova", in Udine
  - 7th Reconnaissance Squadrons Group "Lancieri di Milano", in Orzano di Remanzacco (Leopard 1A2 main battle tanks and VCC-1 armored personnel carriers)
  - 11th Infantry Battalion "Casale" (Recruits Training), in Casale Monferrato
  - 52nd Infantry Fortification Battalion "Alpi", in Attimis
  - 73rd Infantry Fortification Battalion "Lombardia", in Arzene
  - 104th Engineer Battalion "Torre", in Remanzacco|Orzano di Remanzacco
  - 107th Signal Battalion "Predil", in Udine
  - Maneuver Logistic Battalion "Mantova", in Orzano di Remanzacco
  - 48th Reconnaissance Helicopter Squadrons Group "Pavone", in Campoformido (AB-205)
  - Division Artillery Command, in Udine
    - 5th Heavy Field Artillery Group "Superga", in Udine (FH70 155 mm howitzers)
    - 155th Heavy Field Artillery Group "Emilia", in Udine (FH70 155 mm towed howitzers)
    - Artillery Specialists Group "Mantova", in Udine
    - 12th Light Anti-aircraft Artillery Group "Nibbio" (Reserve), in Udine
  - Mechanized Brigade "Brescia", in Brescia
    - Command and Signal Unit "Brescia", in Brescia
    - 13th Tank Battalion "M.O. Pascucci", in Cordenons (Leopard 1A2 main battle tanks)
    - 20th Mechanized Infantry Battalion "Monte San Michele", in Brescia (M113 armored personnel carriers)
    - 30th Mechanized Infantry Battalion "Pisa", in Montorio Veronese (M113 armored personnel carriers)
    - 85th Mechanized Infantry Battalion "Verona", in Montorio Veronese (M113 armored personnel carriers)
    - 52nd Field Artillery Group "Venaria", in Brescia (M114 155 mm howitzers)
    - Logistic Battalion "Brescia", in Montorio Veronese
    - Anti-tank Company "Brescia", in Montorio Veronese
    - Engineer Company "Brescia", in Montorio Veronese
  - Mechanized Brigade "Isonzo", in Cividale del Friuli
    - Command and Signal Unit "Isonzo", in Cividale del Friuli
    - 63rd Tank Battalion "M.O. Fioritto", in Cordenons (Leopard 1A2 main battle tanks)
    - 59th Mechanized Infantry Battalion "Calabria", in Cividale del Friuli (M113 armored personnel carriers)
    - 76th Mechanized Infantry Battalion "Napoli", in Cividale del Friuli (M113 armored personnel carriers)
    - 114th Mechanized Infantry Battalion "Moriago", in Tricesimo (M113 armored personnel carriers)
    - 120th Infantry Fortification Battalion "Fornovo", in Ipplis
    - 28th Self-propelled Field Artillery Group "Livorno", in Tarcento (M109 155 mm self-propelled howitzers)
    - Logistic Battalion "Isonzo", in Tricesimo
    - Anti-tank Company "Isonzo", in Tarcento
    - Engineer Company "Isonzo", in Tarcento
  - Armored Brigade "Pozzuolo del Friuli", in Palmanova
    - Command and Signal Unit "Pozzuolo del Friuli", in Palmanova
    - 4th Mechanized Squadrons Group "Genova Cavalleria", in Palmanova (VCC-1 armored personnel carriers)
    - 5th Tank Squadrons Group "Lancieri di Novara", in Codroipo (Leopard 1A2 main battle tanks)
    - 28th Tank Squadrons Group "Cavalleggeri di Treviso", in Palmanova (Leopard 1A2 main battle tanks)
    - 120th Self-propelled Field Artillery Group "Po", in Palmanova (M109 155 mm self-propelled howitzers)
    - Logistic Battalion "Pozzuolo del Friuli", in Visco
    - Anti-tank Squadron "Pozzuolo del Friuli", in Palmanova
    - Engineer Company "Pozzuolo del Friuli", in Palmanova

==== Mechanized Division "Folgore" ====
- Mechanized Division "Folgore", in Treviso
  - 12th Reconnaissance Squadrons Group "Cavalleggeri di Saluzzo", in Gorizia (Leopard 1A2 main battle tanks and VCC-1 armored personnel carriers)
  - 28th Infantry Battalion "Pavia" (Recruits Training), in Pesaro
  - 53rd Infantry Fortification Battalion "Umbria", in Pavia di Udine
  - 184th Engineer Battalion "Santerno", in Villa Vicentina
  - 184th Signal Battalion "Cansiglio", in Treviso
  - Maneuver Logistic Battalion "Folgore", in Treviso
  - 47th Reconnaissance Helicopter Squadrons Group "Levrieri", in Treviso (AB-206 helicopters)
  - Division Artillery Command, in Treviso
    - 33rd Heavy Field Artillery Group "Terni", in Treviso (FH70 155 mm towed howitzers)
    - 184th Heavy Field Artillery Group "Filottrano", in Padua (FH70 155 mm towed howitzers)
    - Artillery Specialists Group "Folgore", in Treviso
    - 13th Light Anti-aircraft Artillery Group "Condor" (Reserve), in Treviso
  - Amphibious Troops Command (Lagunari), in Venice-Lido
    - Command and Signal Unit, in Venice-Lido
    - 1st Lagunari Battalion "Serenissima", in Malcontenta (VCC-2 armored personnel carriers)
    - Amphibious Battalion "Sile", in San Andrea (LVTP-7 tracked amphibious personnel carriers)
    - Recruits Training Company, in Venice-Lido
  - Mechanized Brigade "Gorizia", in Gorizia
    - Command and Signal Unit "Gorizia", in Gorizia
    - 22nd Tank Battalion "M.O. Piccinini", in San Vito al Tagliamento (Leopard 1A2 main battle tanks)
    - 33rd Infantry Fortification Battalion "Ardenza", in Fogliano Redipuglia
    - 41st Mechanized Infantry Battalion "Modena", in Villa Vicentina (VCC-2 armored personnel carriers)
    - 63rd Infantry Fortification Battalion "Cagliari", in San Lorenzo Isontino
    - 82nd Mechanized Infantry Battalion "Torino", in Cormons (VCC-2 armored personnel carriers)
    - 183rd Mechanized Infantry Battalion "Nembo", in Gradisca d'Isonzo (VCC-2 armored personnel carriers)
    - 46th Self-propelled Field Artillery Group "Trento", in Gradisca d'Isonzo (M109 155 mm self-propelled howitzers)
    - Logistic Battalion "Gorizia", in Gradisca d'Isonzo
    - Anti-tank Company "Gorizia", in Gorizia
    - Engineer Company "Gorizia", in Cormons
  - Mechanized Brigade "Trieste", in Bologna
    - Command and Signal Unit "Trieste", in Bologna
    - 11th Tank Battalion "M.O. Calzecchi", in Ozzano dell'Emilia (Leopard 1A2 main battle tanks)
    - 37th Mechanized Infantry Battalion "Ravenna", in Bologna (VCC-2 armored personnel carriers)
    - 40th Mechanized Infantry Battalion "Bologna", in Bologna (VCC-2 armored personnel carriers)
    - 66th Mechanized Infantry Battalion "Valtellina", in Forlì (VCC-2 armored personnel carriers)
    - 21st Field Artillery Group "Romagna", in Bologna (M114 155 mm howitzers)
    - Logistic Battalion "Trieste", in Budrio
    - Anti-tank Company, in Bologna
    - Engineer Company, in Bologna
  - Armored Brigade "Vittorio Veneto", in Villa Opicina
    - Command and Signal Unit "Vittorio Veneto", in Villa Opicina
    - 2nd Mechanized Squadrons Group "Piemonte Cavalleria", in Villa Opicina (VCC-2 armored personnel carriers)
    - 6th Tank Squadrons Group "Lancieri di Aosta", in Cervignano del Friuli (Leopard 1A2 main battle tanks)
    - 9th Tank Squadrons Group "Lancieri di Firenze", in Sgonico (Leopard 1A2 main battle tanks)
    - 8th Self-propelled Field Artillery Group "Pasubio", in Banne (M109 155 mm self-propelled howitzers)
    - Logistic Battalion "Vittorio Veneto", in Cervignano del Friuli
    - Anti-tank Squadron "Vittorio Veneto", in Banne
    - Engineer Company "Vittorio Veneto", in Cervignano del Friuli

=== I Military Territorial Command ===
- I Military Territorial Command (North-West Military Region), in Turin, responsible for the regions Piedmont, Aosta, Liguria and Lombardy
  - 23rd Infantry Battalion "Como" (Recruits Training), in Como
  - 41st Signal Battalion "Frejus", in Turin
  - 1st Mixed Maneuver Auto Unit, in Turin

=== V Military Territorial Command ===
- V Military Territorial Command (North-East Military Region), in Padua, responsible for the regions Veneto, Friuli-Venezia Giulia and Trentino-Alto Adige/Südtirol
  - 32nd Signal Battalion "Valles", in Padua
  - 42nd Signal Battalion "Pordoi", in Padua
  - 14th Maneuver Auto Group "Flavia", in Montorio Veronese
  - 23rd Signal Company, in Castelnuovo del Garda providing communication services at the secret West Star bunker complex, which in case of war would have housed NATO's COMLANDSOUTH (Command Allied Land Forces Southern Europe) and COMFIVEATAF (Command 5th Allied Tactical Air Force)

=== VII Military Territorial Command ===
- VII Military Territorial Command (Tuscan-Emilian Military Region), in Florence, responsible for the regions Tuscany and Emilia-Romagna
  - 8th Heavy Field Artillery Regiment, in Modena
    - 1st Group, 8th Heavy Field Artillery Regiment, in Modena (M114 155 mm howitzers)
    - 3rd Group, 8th Heavy Field Artillery Regiment (Reserve), in Modena (M101 105 mm howitzers)
  - 84th Infantry Battalion "Venezia" (Recruits Training), in Falconara Marittima
  - 43rd Signal Battalion "Abetone", in Florence
  - 7th Mixed Maneuver Auto Unit, in Florence
  - 27th Light Airplanes and Helicopter Squadrons Group "Mercurio", at Florence-Peretola Air Base (SM-1019 planes and AB-206 helicopters)
  - Paratroopers Brigade "Folgore", in Livorno
    - Command and Signal Unit "Folgore", in Livorno
    - 1st Carabinieri Paratroopers Battalion "Tuscania", in Livorno
    - 2nd Paratroopers Battalion "Tarquinia", in Livorno
    - 5th Paratroopers Battalion "El Alamein", in Siena
    - 9th Paratroopers Assault Battalion "Col Moschin", in Livorno
    - 185th Paratroopers Field Artillery Group "Viterbo", in Livorno (M56 105 mm pack howitzers)
    - Military Parachuting School, in Pisa
      - 3rd Paratroopers Battalion "Poggio Rusco" (Recruits Training), in Pisa
    - Paratroopers Logistic Battalion "Folgore", in Pisa
    - 26th Light Airplanes and Helicopter Squadrons Group "Giove", at Pisa-San Giusto Air Base (SM-1019 planes and AB-206 helicopters)
    - Paratroopers Engineer Company "Folgore", in Lucca
  - Motorized Brigade "Friuli", in Florence
    - Command and Signal Unit "Friuli", in Florence
    - 19th Armored Battalion "M.O. Tumiati", in Florence (M47 Patton tanks and M113 armored personnel carriers)
    - 35th Motorized Infantry Battalion "Pistoia" (Reserve), in Pistoia
    - 78th Motorized Infantry Battalion "Lupi di Toscana", in Scandicci
    - 87th Motorized Infantry Battalion "Senio", in Pistoia
    - 225th Infantry Battalion "Arezzo" (Recruits Training), in Arezzo
    - 35th Field Artillery Group "Riolo", in Pistoia (M114 155 mm howitzers)
    - Logistic Battalion "Friuli", in Coverciano
    - Anti-tank Company "Friuli", in Scandicci
    - Engineer Company "Friuli", in Florence

=== VIII Military Territorial Command ===
- VIII Military Territorial Command (Central Military Region), in Rome, responsible for the regions Lazio, Molise, Marche, Abruzzo and Umbria
  - Infantry School, in Cesano
    - 77th Tank Battalion "M.O. Mattei" (Recruits Training), in Cesano
  - Artillery School, in Bracciano
    - 1st Artillery Group "Cacciatori delle Alpi", in Bracciano
  - Engineer School, in Rome
    - 4th Engineer Battalion (Recruits Training), in Rome
  - 8th Armored Squadrons Group "Lancieri di Montebello", in Rome (Leopard 1A2 main battle tanks and M113 armored personnel carriers)
  - 80th Infantry Battalion "Roma" (Recruits Training), in Cassino
  - 6th Engineer Battalion "Trasimeno", in Rome
  - 11th Signal Battalion "Leonessa", in Civitavecchia
  - 44th Signal Battalion "Penne", in Rome
  - 8th Mixed Maneuver Auto Unit, in Rome
  - 28th Light Airplanes and Helicopter Squadrons Group "Tucano", at Rome-Urbe Air Base (SM-1019 planes and AB-206 helicopters)
  - Motorized Brigade "Acqui", in L'Aquila
    - Command and Signal Unit "Acqui", in L'Aquila
    - 9th Armored Battalion "M.O. Butera", in L'Aquila (M47 Patton tanks and M113 armored personnel carriers)
    - 17th Infantry Battalion "San Martino" (Recruits Training), in Sulmona
    - 57th Motorized Infantry Battalion "Abruzzi", in Sora
    - 70th Motorized Infantry Battalion "Ancona" (Reserve), in Sulmona
    - 130th Motorized Infantry Battalion "Perugia", in Spoleto
    - 48th Field Artillery Group "Taro", in L'Aquila (M114 155 mm howitzers)
    - Logistic Battalion "Acqui", in L'Aquila
    - Anti-tank Company "Acqui", in L'Aquila
    - Engineer Company "Acqui", in L'Aquila
  - Mechanized Brigade "Granatieri di Sardegna", in Rome
    - Command and Signal Unit "Granatieri di Sardegna", in Rome
    - 6th Tank Battalion "M.O. Scapuzzi", in Civitavecchia (M47 Patton tanks)
    - 1st Bersaglieri Battalion "La Marmora", in Civitavecchia (VCC-2 armored personnel carriers)
    - 1st Mechanized Granatieri Battalion "Assietta", in Rome (VCC-1 armored personnel carriers)
    - 2nd Mechanized Granatieri Battalion "Cengio", in Rome (VCC-1 armored personnel carriers)
    - 3rd Granatieri Battalion "Guardie" (Recruits Training), in Orvieto
    - 13th Field Artillery Group "Magliana", in Civitavecchia (M114 155 mm howitzers)
    - Logistic Battalion "Granatieri di Sardegna", in Civitavecchia
    - Anti-tank Company "Granatieri di Sardegna", in Civitavecchia
    - Engineer Company "Granatieri di Sardegna", in Civitavecchia

=== X Military Territorial Command ===
- X Military Territorial Command (Meridional Military Region), in Naples, responsible for the regions Apulia, Basilicata, Campania and Calabria
  - Tank School, in Lecce
    - 21st Tank Battalion "M.O. Scognamiglio" (Reserve), in Lecce
    - 31st Tank Battalion "M.O. Andreani" (Training), in Lecce
  - 9th Heavy Field Artillery Regiment, in Foggia
    - Command and Services Battery
    - 1st Group, in Foggia (M114 155 mm howitzers)
    - 2nd Group, in Barletta (M114 155 mm towed howitzers)
    - 3rd Group, in Bari (M114 155 mm towed howitzers)
  - 47th Infantry Battalion "Salento" (Recruits Training), in Barletta
  - 89th Infantry Battalion "Salerno" (Recruits Training), in Salerno
  - 91st Infantry Battalion "Lucania" (Recruits Training), in Potenza
  - 244th Infantry Battalion "Cosenza" (Recruits Training), in Cosenza
  - 21st Engineer Battalion "Timavo", in Caserta
  - 45th Signal Battalion "Vulture", in Naples
  - 10th Mixed Maneuver Auto Unit, in Naples
  - 20th Light Airplanes and Helicopter Squadrons Group "Andromeda", at Salerno-Pontecagnano Air Base (SM-1019 planes and AB-206 helicopters)
  - Mechanized Brigade "Pinerolo", in Bari
    - Command and Signal Unit "Pinerolo", in Bari
    - 60th Tank Battalion "M.O. Locatelli", in Altamura (M47 Patton tanks)
    - 9th Mechanized Infantry Battalion "Bari", in Trani (VCC-1 armored personnel carriers)
    - 13th Mechanized Infantry Battalion "Valbella", in Avellino (VCC-1 armored personnel carriers)
    - 67th Bersaglieri Battalion "Fagarè", in Persano (VCC-1 armored personnel carriers)
    - 231st Infantry Battalion "Avellino" (Recruits Training), in Avellino
    - 11th Field Artillery Group "Teramo", in Persano (M114 155 mm howitzers)
    - Logistic Battalion "Pinerolo", in Bari
    - Anti-tank Company "Pinerolo", in Bari
    - Engineer Company "Pinerolo", in Trani

=== Sicily Military Region ===
- Sicily Military Region (R.M.SI.), in Palermo (Sicily region)
  - Command Battalion Sicily Military Region, in Palermo
  - 60th Infantry Battalion "Col di Lana" (Recruits Training), in Trapani
  - 51st Engineer Battalion "Simeto", in Palermo (raised 1 October 1983)
  - 46th Signal Battalion "Mongibello", in Palermo
  - 11th Mixed Maneuver Auto Unit, in Palermo
  - 11th Logistics Unit, in Messina
  - 30th Light Airplanes and Helicopter Squadrons Group "Pegaso", at Catania-Fontanarossa Air Base
    - 301° Light Airplanes Squadron (SM.1019A planes)
    - 430° Reconnaissance Helicopter Squadron (AB 206 reconnaissance helicopters)
    - 530° Multirole Helicopter Squadron (AB 204B/205 multirole helicopters)
  - 11th Medical Company, in Palermo
  - 11th Supply Company, in Palermo
  - 11th Army Repair Workshop, in Palermo
  - Type B Military Hospital, in Palermo
  - Type B Military Hospital, in Messina
  - Garrison Detachment, on Pantelleria island
  - Motorized Brigade "Aosta", in Messina
    - Command and Signal Unit "Aosta", in Messina
    - 62nd Armored Battalion "M.O. Jero", in Catania (M47 Patton tanks and VCC-2 armored personnel carriers)
    - 5th Motorized Infantry Battalion "Col della Berretta", in Messina
    - 62nd Motorized Infantry Battalion "Sicilia", in Catania
    - 141st Motorized Infantry Battalion "Catanzaro", in Palermo
    - 24th Field Artillery Group "Peloritani", in Messina (M114 155 mm towed howitzers)
    - Logistic Battalion "Aosta", in Messina
    - Anti-tank Company "Aosta", in Messina
    - Engineer Company "Aosta", in Syracuse

=== Sardinia Autonomous Military Command ===
- Sardinia Autonomous Military Command (Sardinia Military Region), in Cagliari, responsible for the island of Sardinia
  - 1st Armored Infantry Regiment, in Capo Teulada
    - 1st Armored Infantry Battalion
      - Command and Services Company
      - 1st Tank Company, 16x Leopard 1A2 main battle tanks
      - 2nd Bersaglieri Company, 13x M113 armored personnel carriers
      - Reconnaissance Helicopter Squadron, 6x AB-206 helicopters
      - Self-propelled Artillery Battery, 6x M109 155 mm self-propelled howitzers
    - 2nd Armored Infantry Battalion (Reserve) (configured the same as the 1st Battalion)
  - 45th Infantry Battalion "Arborea" (Recruits Training), in Macomer
  - 151st Infantry Battalion "Sette Comuni" (Recruits Training), in Cagliari
  - 152nd Infantry Battalion "Sassari" (Recruits Training), in Sassari
  - 21st Light Airplanes and Helicopter Squadrons Group "Orsa Maggiore", at Cagliari-Elmas Air Base (SM-1019 planes and AB-206 helicopters)
  - 47th Signal Company, in Cagliari
  - 12th Mixed Transport Battalion, in Cagliari

=== Artillery and NBC-defense Inspectorate ===
- Artillery and NBC-defense Inspectorate, in Rome
  - 1st NBC Battalion "Etruria", in Rieti
  - Army Anti-aircraft Artillery Command, in Padua
    - Command and Signal Unit, in Padua
    - 4th Anti-aircraft Missile Artillery Regiment, in Mantua
      - Command and Services Battery, in Mantua
      - 1st Group, 4th Anti-aircraft Missile Artillery Regiment, in Ravenna (MIM-23 Hawk surface-to-air missiles)
      - 2nd Group, 4th Anti-aircraft Missile Artillery Regiment, in Mantua (MIM-23 Hawk surface-to-air missiles)
      - 24th Signal Company, in Mantua
    - 5th Anti-aircraft Missile Artillery Regiment, in Mestre
      - Command and Services Battery, in Mestre
      - 1st Group, 5th Anti-aircraft Missile Artillery Regiment, in San Donà di Piave (MIM-23 Hawk surface-to-air missiles)
      - 2nd Group, 5th Anti-aircraft Missile Artillery Regiment, in Rovigo (MIM-23 Hawk surface-to-air missiles)
      - 25th Signal Company, in Mestre
    - 121st Light Anti-aircraft Artillery Regiment, in Bologna
      - Command Unit, in Bologna
      - 1st Group, 121st Light Anti-aircraft Artillery Regiment, in Bologna
      - 2nd Group, 121st Light Anti-aircraft Artillery Regiment, in Mestre
      - 3rd Group, 121st Light Anti-aircraft Artillery Regiment, in Rimini
      - 4th Group, 121st Light Anti-aircraft Artillery Regiment, in Ferrara
    - 17th Light Anti-aircraft Artillery Group "Sforzesca", at Villafranca Air Base
      - 1st Battery, at Villafranca Air Base
      - 2nd Battery, at Ghedi Air Base
      - 3rd Battery, at Istrana Air Base
      - 4th Battery, at Rimini Air Base
      - 5th Battery, at Cervia Air Base
    - 21st Light Anti-aircraft Artillery Group "Sparviero" (Reserve), in Bologna
    - 22nd Light Anti-aircraft Artillery Group "Alcione" (Reserve), in Bologna
    - Missile Supply and Repair Battalion, in Montichiari
    - Anti-aircraft Material Supply and Repair Battalion, in Bologna
    - 235th Infantry Battalion "Piceno" (Recruits Training), in Ascoli Piceno

=== Army Light Aviation Inspectorate ===
- Army Light Aviation Inspectorate, in Rome
  - 1st Army Aviation Regiment "Antares", in Viterbo
    - 11th Transport Helicopter Squadrons Group "Ercole", in Viterbo (CH-47C Chinook heavy-lift helicopters)
    - 12th Transport Helicopter Squadrons Group "Gru", in Viterbo (CH-47C Chinook heavy-lift helicopters)
    - 51st Medium Helicopter Squadrons Group "Leone", in Viterbo (AB-412 utility helicopters)

=== Engineer Inspectorate ===
- Engineer Inspectorate, in Rome
  - 2nd Pontieri Engineer Regiment, in Piacenza
    - Command and Services Company, in Piacenza
    - 1st Battalion, in Legnago
    - 2nd Battalion, in Piacenza
    - 3rd Battalion, in Piacenza
  - Ferrovieri Engineer Regiment, in Castel Maggiore
    - Command and Services Company, in Castel Maggiore
    - 1st Metal Bridges Battalion, in Castel Maggiore
    - 2nd Battalion (Training), in Turin

=== Signal Inspectorate ===
- Signal Inspectorate, in Rome
  - 8th Signals Intelligence Battalion "Tonale", in Anzio
  - 9th Electronic Warfare Battalion "Rombo", in Anzio
  - 10th Signal Battalion "Lanciano", in Rome

=== Army General Staff – V Department ===
- Army General Staff – V Department, Rome
  - 11th Maneuver Auto Group "Flaminia", in Rome

=== Carabinieri ===
Until 2000 the Carabinieri were an "Arma" (corps) of the Italian Army tasked with police duties in every Italian city and village. The Carabinieri's higher units in 1984 were:

- Carabinieri Corps General Command, in Rome
  - 1st Division, in Milan, responsible for Northern Italy
  - 2nd Division, in Rome, responsible for Central Italy
  - 3rd Division, in Naples, responsible for Southern Italy
  - Schools and Special Units Division, in Rome

Divisions commanded brigades, which were each responsible for policing a number of Italian regions. The brigades were further divided into Legions (Regiments), which were each responsible for policing a small region or part of a larger region. Legiones were further divided into Groups (Battalions), which were responsible for policing a province. The groups were further divided into stations, one of which could be found in every Italian city or comune.

The Carabinieri also provided military police units for the Italian Army, Italian Navy, and Italian Air Force. The units under direct command of the Carabinieri Corps General Command were:

- Carabinieri Corps General Command, in Rome
  - President of the Republic Guards Command, in Rome
  - President of the Republic Carabinieri Command, in Rome
  - Army General Staff Autonomous Carabinieri Group, in Rome
  - Air Force Carabinieri Command, in Rome
    - 1st Air Region Carabinieri Group, in Milan
    - 2nd Air Region Carabinieri Group, in Rome
    - 3rd Air Region Carabinieri Group, in Bari
  - Navy Carabinieri Command, in Rome
    - Navy Carabinieri Group, in Rome
  - Carabinieri Helicopter Centre, at Pratica di Mare Air Base
    - 1st Helicopter Squadron, at Turin Airport
    - 2nd Helicopter Squadron, at Orio al Serio Airport
    - 3rd Helicopter Squadron, at Bolzano Airport
    - 4th Helicopter Squadron, at Pisa-San Giusto Airport
    - 5th Helicopter Squadron, at Falconara Marittima
    - 6th Helicopter Squadron, at Bari Airport
    - 7th Helicopter Squadron, at Pontecagnano Airport
    - 8th Helicopter Squadron, at Vibo Valentia Airport
    - 9th Helicopter Squadron, at Palermo Airport
    - 10th Helicopter Squadron, at Olbia Airport
    - 11th Helicopter Squadron, at Cagliari Elmas Airport

==== 1st Division ====
- 1 Divisione, in Milan, responsible for Northern Italy
  - I Brigata, in Turin, responsible for the Aosta, Liguria, and Piedmont regions
    - Legione di Torino, responsible for the Aosta region and the Northern part of the Piedmont region
      - Gruppo di Aosta
      - Gruppo di Novara
      - Gruppo di Vercelli
      - Gruppo di Turin
    - Legione di Alessandria, responsible for the Southern part of the Piedmont region
      - Gruppo di Alessandria
      - Gruppo di Asti
      - Gruppo di Cuneo
    - Legione di Genova, responsible for the Liguria region
      - Gruppo di Genova
      - Gruppo di La Spezia
      - Gruppo di Imperia
      - Gruppo di Savona
  - II Brigata, in Milan, responsible for the Western part of the Lombardy region
    - Legione di Milano, responsible for the Lombardy region
      - Gruppo di Milano I (Province of Milano)
      - Gruppo di Milano II (Province of Monza)
      - Gruppo di Milano III (Province of Lodi)
      - Gruppo di Como
      - Gruppo di Varese
      - Gruppo di Pavia
    - Legione di Brescia, responsible for the Eastern part of the Lombardy region
      - Gruppo di Brescia
      - Gruppo di Mantova
      - Gruppo di Cremona
      - Gruppo di Bergamo
      - Gruppo di Sondrio
  - III Brigata, in Padua, responsible for the Friuli-Venezia Giulia, Trentino-Alto Adige, and Veneto regions
    - Legione di Padova, responsible for most of the Veneto region
      - Gruppo di Padova
      - Gruppo di Rovigo
      - Gruppo di Verona
      - Gruppo di Vicenza
      - Gruppo di Venezia
      - Gruppo di Treviso
    - Legione di Udine, responsible for the Friuli-Venezia Giulia region
      - Gruppo di Udine
      - Gruppo di Pordenone
      - Gruppo di Gorizia
      - Gruppo di Trieste
    - Legione di Bolzano, responsible for the Trentino-Alto Adige region and the Province of Belluno of the Veneto region
      - Gruppo di Bolzano
      - Gruppo di Trento
      - Gruppo di Belluno

==== 2nd Division ====
- 2 Divisione, in Rome, responsible for Central Italy
  - IV Brigata, in Bologna, responsible for the Emilia-Romagna and Marche regions
    - Legione di Bologna, responsible for the Eastern part of the Emilia-Romagna region
      - Gruppo di Bologna
      - Gruppo di Ferrara
      - Gruppo di Forlì
      - Gruppo di Ravenna
    - Legione di Parma, responsible for the Western part of the Emilia-Romagna region
      - Gruppo di Parma
      - Gruppo di Piacenza
      - Gruppo di Modena
      - Gruppo di Reggio Emilia
    - Legione di Ancona, responsible for the Marche region
      - Gruppo di Ancona
      - Gruppo di Macerata
      - Gruppo di Pesaro
      - Gruppo di Ascoli Piceno
  - V Brigata, in Florence, responsible for the Tuscany and Umbria regions
    - Legione di Firenze, responsible for the Eastern part of the Tuscany region
      - Gruppo di Firenze
      - Gruppo di Pistoia
      - Gruppo di Siena
      - Gruppo di Arezzo
    - Legione di Livorno, responsible for the Western part of the Tuscany region
      - Gruppo di Livorno
      - Gruppo di Pisa
      - Gruppo di Grosseto
      - Gruppo di Lucca
      - Gruppo di Massa Carrara
    - Legione di Perugia, responsible for the Umbria region
      - Gruppo di Perugia
      - Gruppo di Terni
  - VI Brigata, in Rome, responsible for the Lazio and Sardinia regions
    - Legione di Roma, responsible for the Province of Rome
      - Gruppo di Roma I
      - Gruppo di Roma II
      - Gruppo di Roma III (in Frascati)
    - Legione Lazio, responsible for the areas of the Lazio region outside of the province of Rome
      - Gruppo di Rieti
      - Gruppo di Latina
      - Gruppo di Viterbo
      - Gruppo di Frosinone
    - Legione di Cagliari, responsible for the Sardinia region
      - Gruppo di Cagliari
      - Gruppo di Oristano
      - Gruppo di Nuoro
      - Gruppo di Sassari

==== 3rd Division ====
- 3 Divisione, in Naples, responsible for Southern Italy
  - VII Brigata, in Naples, responsible for the Basilicata, Calabria, and Campania regions
    - Legione di Napoli, responsible for most of the Campania region
      - Gruppo di Napoli I, responsible for the Province of Naples
      - Gruppo di Napoli II, responsible for the Avellino, Benevento, and Caserta provinces
    - Legione di Salerno, responsible for the Basilicata region and the Province of Salerno of the Campania region
      - Gruppo di Salerno
      - Gruppo di Matera
      - Gruppo di Potenza
    - Legione di Catanzaro, responsible for the Calabria region
      - Gruppo di Catanzaro
      - Gruppo di Reggio Calabria
      - Gruppo di Cosenza
  - VIII Brigata, in Bari, responsible for the Abruzzo, Apulia, and Molise regions
    - Legione di Bari, responsible for the Apulia region
      - Gruppo di Bari
      - Gruppo di Brindisi
      - Gruppo di Foggia
      - Gruppo di Lecce
      - Gruppo di Taranto
    - Legione di Chieti, responsible for the Abruzzo and Molise regions
      - Gruppo di Chieti
      - Gruppo di Pescara
      - Gruppo di Teramo
      - Gruppo di L'Aquila
      - Gruppo di Isernia
      - Gruppo di Campobasso
  - IX Brigata, in Palermo, responsible for the Sicily region
    - Legione di Palermo, responsible for the Eastern part of the Sicily region
      - Gruppo di Palermo
      - Gruppo di Agrigento
      - Gruppo di Trapani
      - Gruppo di Caltanissetta
    - Legione di Messina, responsible for Western part of the Sicily region
      - Gruppo di Messina
      - Gruppo di Catania
      - Gruppo di Enna
      - Gruppo di Ragusa
      - Gruppo di Siracusa

==== Schools and Special Units Division ====
- Schools and Special Units Division, in Rome
  - Carabinieri Officers School, in Rome
  - X Brigata, in Rome, the brigade trained all recruits and Non-commissioned Officers of the Carabinieri corps.
    - Carabinieri Non-commissioned Officers School, in Florence
      - 1st Carabinieri Non-commissioned Officers Recruits Battalion, in Velletri
    - Carabinieri Recruits School "Roma", in Rome
      - 1st Carabinieri Recruits Battalion, in Rome
      - 2nd Carabinieri Recruits Battalion, in Campobasso
      - 3rd Carabinieri Recruits Battalion, in Iglesias
    - Carabinieri Recruits School "Benevento", in Benevento
      - 1st Carabinieri Recruits Battalion, in Benevento
      - 2nd Carabinieri Recruits Battalion, in Chieti
    - Carabinieri Recruits School "Torino", in Turin
      - 1st Carabinieri Recruits Battalion, in Turin
      - 2nd Carabinieri Recruits Battalion, in Fossano
  - XI Brigata, in Rome, the XI Brigade consisted of light infantry battalions, which doubled as riot police during peacetime, and the 7th and 13th armored battalions, which were tasked with rear-area security duties for the army's two frontline corps.
    - Mounted Carabinieri Regiment, in Rome
    - 1st Carabinieri Battalion "Piemonte", in Moncalieri
    - 2nd Carabinieri Battalion "Liguria", in Genoa
    - 3rd Carabinieri Battalion "Lombardia", in Milan
    - 4th Carabinieri Battalion "Veneto", in Mestre
    - 5th Carabinieri Battalion "Emilia-Romagna", in Bologna
    - 6th Carabinieri Battalion "Toscana", in Florence
    - 7th Armored Carabinieri Battalion "M.O. Petrucelli", in Laives (M47 Patton tanks and M113 armored personnel carriers) (permanently detached to the 4th Alpine Army Corps)
    - 8th Carabinieri Battalion "Lazio", in Rome
    - 9th Carabinieri Battalion "Sardegna", in Cagliari
    - 10th Carabinieri Battalion "Campania", in Naples
    - 11th Carabinieri Battalion "Puglia", in Bari
    - 12th Carabinieri Battalion "Sicilia", in Palermo
    - 13th Armored Carabinieri Battalion "M.O. Gallo", in Gorizia (Leopard 1A2 main battle tanks and VCC-2 armored personnel carriers) (permanently detached to the 5th Army Corps)

== Ministry of Defense ==
The following units were permanently attached to the Italian Ministry of Defense in Rome:

- Ministry of Defense Autonomous Goupment Command, in Rome
  - 10th Maneuver Transport Group "Salaria", in Rome

== NATO Comlandsouth ==
The following units were permanently attached to NATO's Allied Land Forces Southern Europe in Verona:

- Tactical-psychological Support Battalion Monte Grappa, in Verona
- Mixed Telecommunication Support Group (Italian Army/Italian Air Force), in Verona
