= Logistic Battalion "Pinerolo" =

Inactive Italian Army brigade logistics unit

- Reggimento Battalion "Pinerolo"
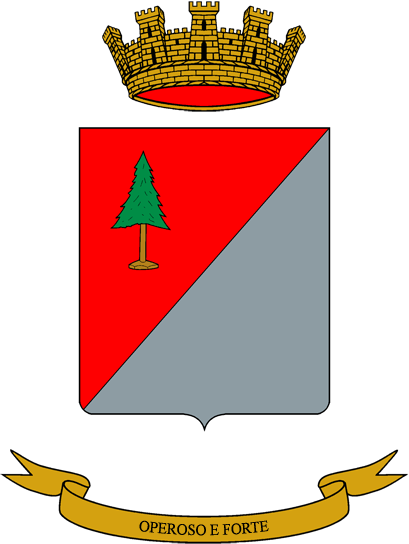
- Battalion coat of arms
- Active: 1 Nov. 1975 — 1 Feb. 2001
- Country: Italy
- Branch: Italian Army
- Role: Military logistics
- Part of: Mechanized Brigade "Pinerolo"
- Garrison/HQ: Bari
- Motto(s): "Operoso e forte"
- Anniversaries: 22 May 1916 - Battle of Asiago

Insignia
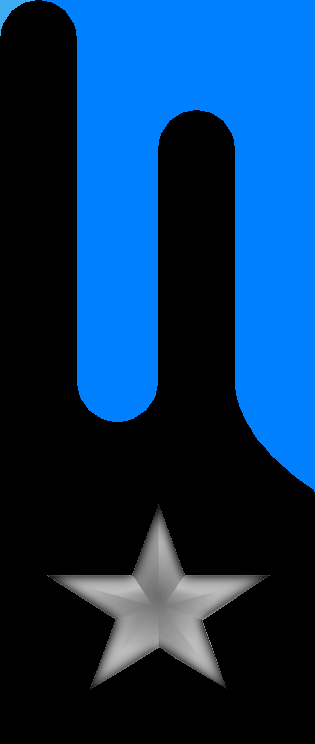
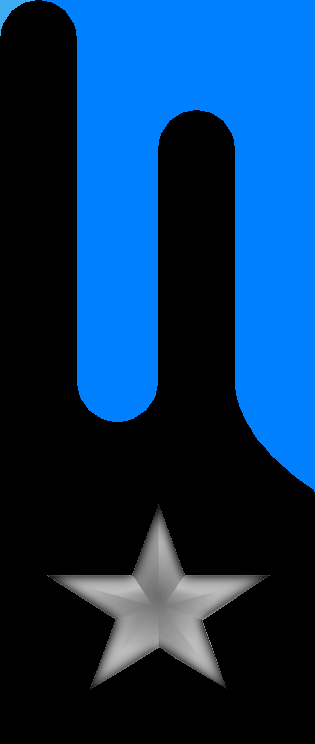
- Unit gorget patches

The Logistic Battalion "Pinerolo" (Italian: Battaglione Logistico "Pinerolo") is an inactive military logistics battalion of the Italian Army, which was assigned to the Mechanized Brigade "Pinerolo". The battalion's anniversary falls, as for all units of the Italian Army's Transport and Materiel Corps, on 22 May, the anniversary of the Royal Italian Army's first major use of automobiles to transport reinforcements to the Asiago plateau to counter the Austro-Hungarian Asiago Offensive in May 1916.

== History ==
The battalion is the spiritual successor of the logistic units of the Royal Italian Army's 24th Infantry Division "Pinerolo", which fought in the Greco-Italian War of World War II. After the war the division was reformed on 15 April 1952 as Infantry Division "Pinerolo".

=== Cold War ===
On 1 September 1956, the logistic units of the Infantry Division "Pinerolo" were assigned to the newly formed Service Units Command "Pinerolo" in Bari. The command consisted of a medical section, a provisions section, a mobile vehicle park, a mobile workshop, and an auto unit. In 1960, the mobile vehicle park and mobile workshop merged to form the Resupply, Repairs, Recovery Unit "Pinerolo".

On 1 September 1962, the Infantry Division "Pinerolo" was reduced to Infantry Brigade "Pinerolo" and consequently, on 15 December 1962, the Service Units Command "Pinerolo" was disbanded, with only the Resupply, Repairs, Recovery Unit "Pinerolo" and Auto Unit "Pinerolo" remaining with the brigade.

On 1 November 1975, as part of the 1975 army reform, the Resupply, Repairs, Recovery Unit "Pinerolo" and Auto Unit "Pinerolo" merged to form the Logistic Battalion "Pinerolo", which received the traditions of all preceding logistic, transport, medical, maintenance, and supply units bearing the name "Pinerolo". The battalion consisted of a command, a command platoon, a supply and transport company, a medium workshop, a vehicle park, and a medical company. At the time the battalion fielded 651 men (37 officers, 82 non-commissioned officers, and 532 soldiers).

On 12 November 1976, the President of the Italian Republic Giovanni Leone granted with decree 846 the battalion a flag.

On 1 October 1981, the battalion was reorganized and consisted afterwards of the following units:

- Logistic Battalion "Pinerolo", in Messina
  - Command and Services Company
  - Supply Company
  - Maintenance Company
  - Medium Transport Company
  - Medical Unit (Reserve)

=== Recent times ===
On 31 January 2001, the battalion lost its autonomy and entered the next day the 10th Logistic Support Regiment "Appia". Consequently, the battalion's flag was transferred to the Shrine of the Flags in the Vittoriano in Rome for safekeeping.

== See also ==
- Military logistics
