= Logistic Regiment "Pinerolo" =

Active Italian Army brigade logistics unit

- Reggimento Logistico "Pinerolo"
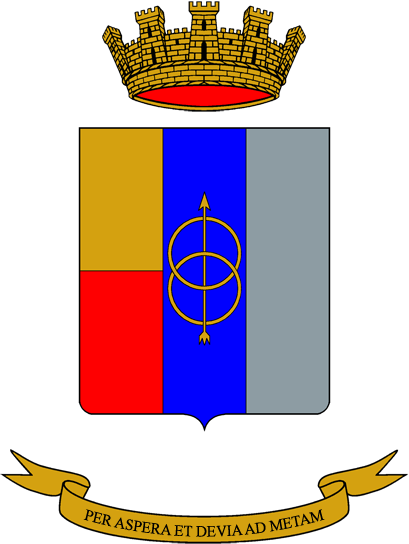
- Regimental coat of arms
- Active: 25 May 1987 — today
- Country: Italy
- Branch: Italian Army
- Role: Military logistics
- Part of: Mechanized Brigade "Pinerolo"
- Garrison/HQ: Bari
- Motto(s): "Per aspera et devia ad metam"
- Anniversaries: 22 May 1916 - Battle of Asiago
- Decorations: 1× Silver Cross of Army Merit

Insignia
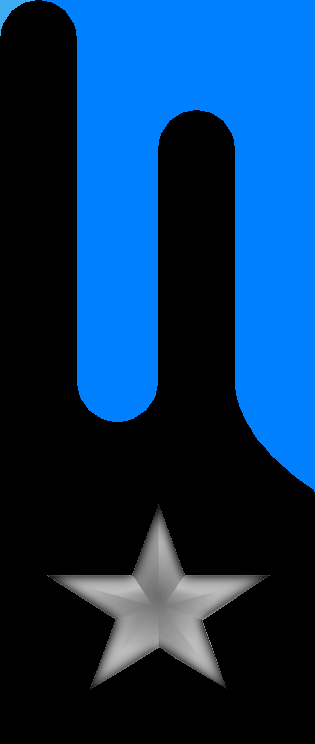
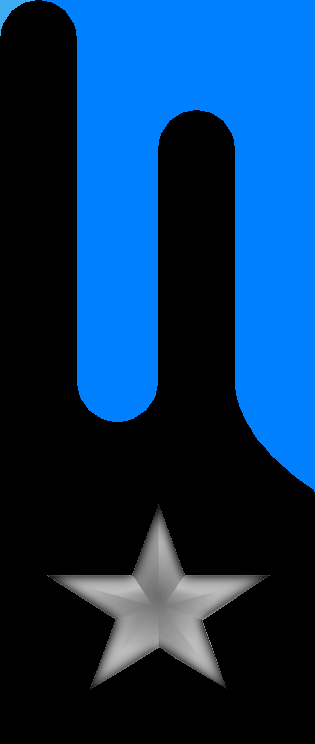
- Unit gorget patches

The Logistic Regiment "Pinerolo" (Italian: Reggimento Logistico "Pinerolo") is a military logistics regiment of the Italian Army based in Bari in Apulia. Originally a transport unit, the regiment is now the logistic unit of the Mechanized Brigade "Pinerolo". The regiment's anniversary falls, as for all units of the Italian Army's Transport and Materiel Corps, on 22 May, the anniversary of the Royal Italian Army's first major use of automobiles to transport reinforcements to the Asiago plateau to counter the Austro-Hungarian Asiago Offensive in May 1916.

== History ==
=== Interwar years ===
In August 1920, the VIII Automobilistic Center was formed in Naples and assigned to the VIII Army Corps. In 1923, the center was disbanded and its personnel and materiel used to form the VIII Auto Grouping, which consisted of a command, an auto group, a railway group, and a depot. On 31 October 1926, the grouping was disbanded and the next day its personnel and materiel were used to from the 10th Automobilistic Center in Naples. The center consisted of a command, the X Automobilistic Group, and a depot. The three companies of the disbanded railway group were assigned to the 10th Field Artillery Regiment, 12th Field Artillery Regiment, and 25th Field Artillery Regiment.

In 1935-36, the center mobilized five auto units for the Second Italo-Ethiopian War. The regiment also provided one officer and 680 soldiers to other to units, which deployed to East Africa for the war.

=== World War II ===
On 1 July 1942, the 10th Automobilistic Center was renamed 10th Drivers Regiment. In the evening of 8 September 1943, the Armistice of Cassibile, which ended hostilities between the Kingdom of Italy and the Anglo-American Allies, was announced by General Dwight D. Eisenhower on Radio Algiers and by Marshal Pietro Badoglio on Italian radio. Germany reacted by invading Italy and the 10th Drivers Regiment was disbanded soon thereafter by German forces. During World War II the center mobilized in its depot in Naples among others the following units:

- 15th Auto Grouping Command
- 132nd Drivers Marching Regiment (provided reserve drivers to units in combat)
- 7th Heavy Auto Group
- 42nd Heavy Auto Group
- 8th Roadside Assistance Unit
- 21st Auto Workshop
- 22nd Auto Workshop
- 23rd Auto Workshop
- 24th Auto Workshop
- 25th Auto Workshop
- 26th Auto Workshop
- 59th Heavy Mobile Workshop

On 1 November 1943, the 10th Drivers Regiment was reformed in Naples by the Italian Co-belligerent Army. The regiment provided drivers for the Italian Liberation Corps and the co-belligerent army's combat groups, which fought on the allied side in the Italian campaign. On 1 March 1945, the regiment was disbanded.

=== Cold War ===
On 1 March 1947, the 10th Drivers Center was formed in Naples, which consisted of a command, the 10th Auto Unit, the 10th Vehicles Park, a fuel depot, and a depot. The center supported the X Territorial Military Command of the Southern Military Region. On 1 March 1949, the 10th Vehicles Park was transferred to the 10th Automotive Repair Shop. In 1957, the 9th Drivers Center in Bari was disbanded and the 10th Drivers Center became responsible for the entire Southern Military Region. The unit was tasked with the transport of fuel, ammunition, and materiel between the military region's depots and the logistic supply points of the army's divisions and brigades. On 31 December 1964, the 10th Drivers Center was disbanded. The next day the 10th Auto Unit became an autonomous unit and was assigned to the X Territorial Military Command.

As part of the 1975 army reform the unit was renamed 10th Mixed Maneuver Auto Unit.

On 25 May 1987, the 10th Mixed Maneuver Auto Unit was reorganized as 10th Transport Battalion "Appia". Like all Italian Army transport units the battalion was named for a historic road near its base, in case of the 10th Transport Battalion for the Roman road Via Appia, which connected Rome and Brindisi. On 13 July 1987, the President of the Italian Republic Francesco Cossiga granted the battalion a flag and assigned the battalion the traditions of the 10th Drivers Regiment. At the time the battalion consisted of a command, a command and services company, a mixed transport company, and a special transports company.

=== Recent times ===
On 30 June 1996, the 10th Transport Battalion "Appia" was disbanded and the next day its personnel and materiel were used to from the 10th Military Region Logistic Unit "Appia", which consisted of a command, a command and services company, a transport battalion, and a movement control and convoy escort company. The unit's transport battalion fielded a mixed transport company, a special transport company, and a maintenance company. On 1 July 1998, the unit was renamed 10th Logistic Support Regiment "Appia" and on 1 October of the same year, the regiment moved from Naples to Bari.

On 1 February 2001, the regiment incorporated the Logistic Battalion "Pinerolo" of the Armored Brigade "Pinerolo" and, on the same day, the regiment was assigned to the Logistic Projection Brigade. On 1 March 2001, the regiment was reorganized and renamed 10th Transport Regiment. The regiment consisted of a command, a command and logistic support company, a transport battalion, and a movement control battalion.

On 12 September 2013, the Logistic Projection Command was disbanded and the 10th Transport Regiment was assigned to the Mechanized Brigade "Pinerolo". On 1 January 2015, the regiment was renamed Logistic Regiment "Pinerolo" and reorganized as a brigade logistic regiment. For its conduct and work during the COVID-19 pandemic the regiment was awarded in 2022 a Silver Cross of Army Merit, which was affixed to the regiment's flag.

== Organization ==
As of 2024 the Logistic Regiment "Pinerolo" is organized as follows:

- Logistic Regiment "Pinerolo", in Bari
  - Command and Logistic Support Company
  - Logistic Battalion
    - Transport Company
    - Maintenance Company
    - Supply Company

== See also ==
- Military logistics
