= 9th Infantry Regiment "Bari" =

- 9° Reggimento Fanteria "Bari"
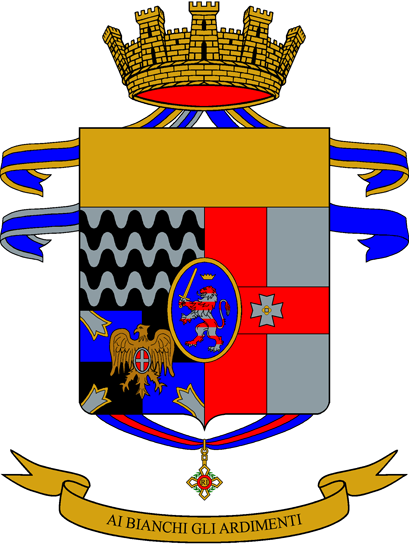
- Regimental coat of arms
- Active: 8 April 1734 – today
- Country: Italy
- Branch: Italian Army
- Part of: Mechanized Brigade "Pinerolo"
- Garrison/HQ: Trani
- Motto(s): "Ai bianchi gli ardimenti"
- Anniversaries: 24 October 1915 – Battle of San Michele del Carso
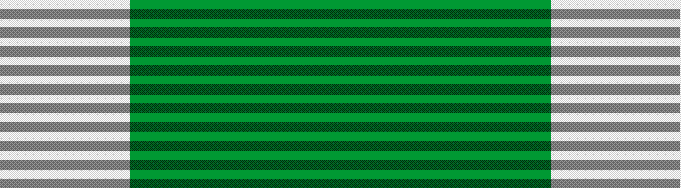
- Decorations: 2× Military Order of Italy; 2× Gold Medals of Military Valor; 1× Silver Medal of Military Valor; 1× Bronze Medal of Military Valor; 1× Silver Medal of Merit

Insignia
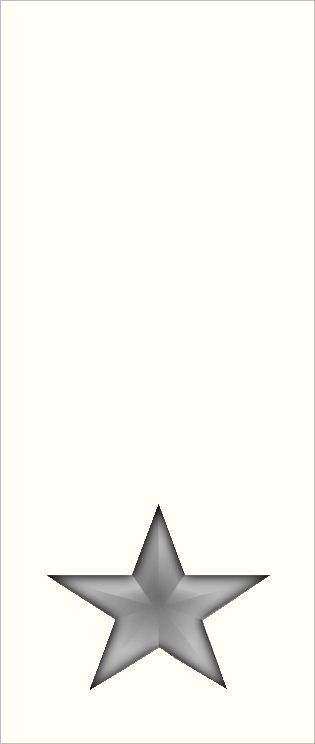
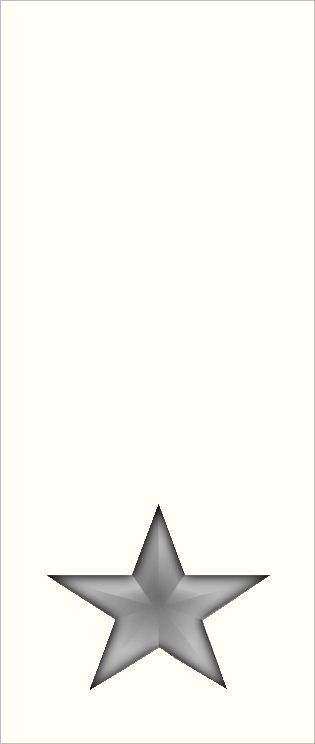
- Regimental gorget patches

The 9th Infantry Regiment "Bari" (Italian: 9° Reggimento Fanteria "Bari") is an active unit of the Italian Army based in Trani in Apulia. The regiment is part of the Italian army's infantry corps and operationally assigned to the Mechanized Brigade "Pinerolo".

== History ==
=== World War I ===
At the outbreak of World War I, the Brigade "Regina" formed, together with the Brigade "Pisa" and the 35th Field Artillery Regiment, the 21st Division. At the time the 9th Infantry Regiment consisted of three battalions, each of which fielded four fusilier companies and one machine gun section.

== Organization ==
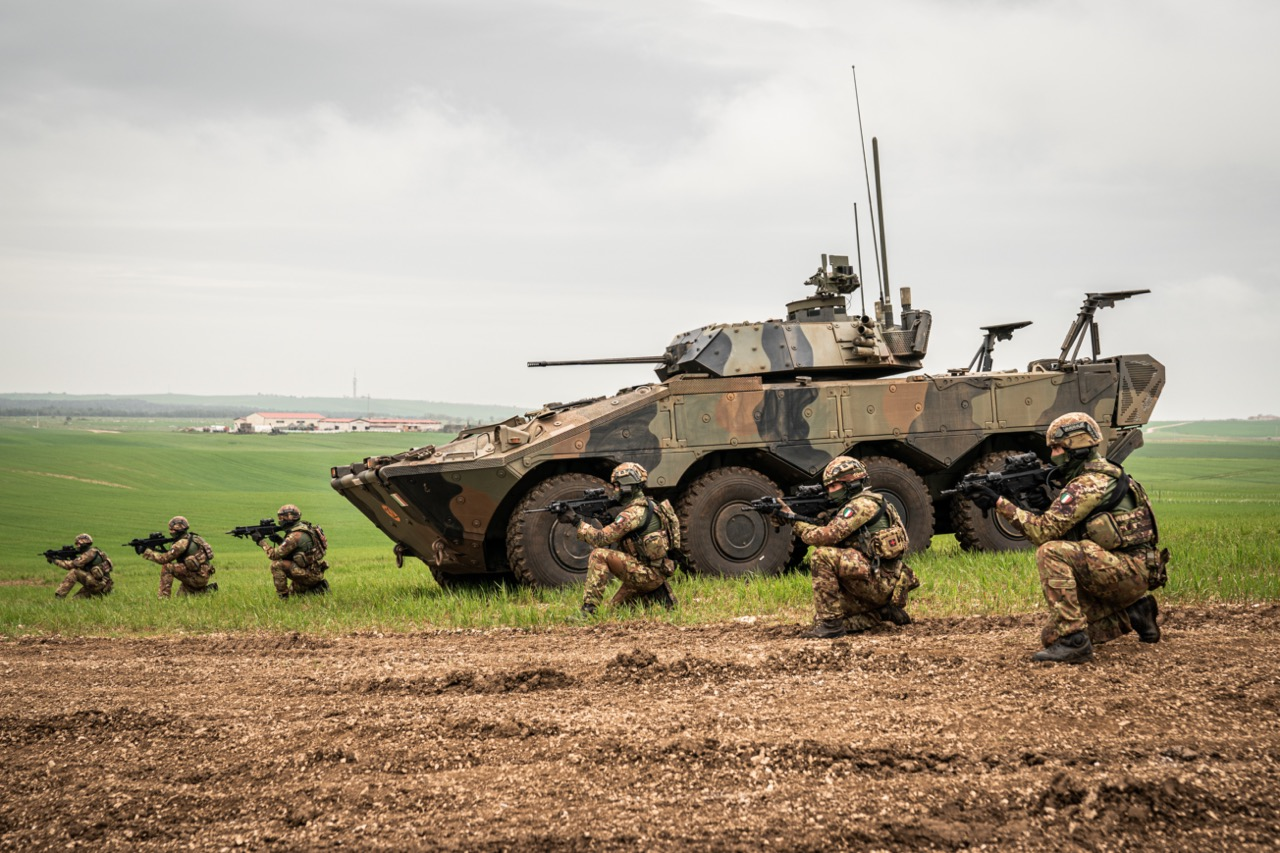
9th Infantry Regiment "Bari" VBM Freccia IFV with dismounted infantry squad during exercise Scudo 25

As of 2023 the 9th Infantry Regiment "Bari" consists of:

- Regimental Command, in Trani
  - Command and Logistic Support Company
  - 1st Infantry Battalion
    - 1st Fusiliers Company
    - 2nd Fusiliers Company
    - 3rd Fusiliers Company
    - Maneuver Support Company

The Command and Logistic Support Company fields the following platoons: C3 Platoon, Transport and Materiel Platoon, Medical Platoon, and Commissariat Platoon. The regiment is equipped with Freccia wheeled infantry fighting vehicles. The Maneuver Support Company is equipped with Freccia mortar carries with 120mm mortars and Freccia IFVs with Spike LR anti-tank guided missiles.

== See also ==
- Mechanized Brigade "Pinerolo"
