= 60th Tank Battalion "M.O. Locatelli" =

Inactive Italian Army tank unit

- 60° Battaglione Carri "M.O. Locatelli"
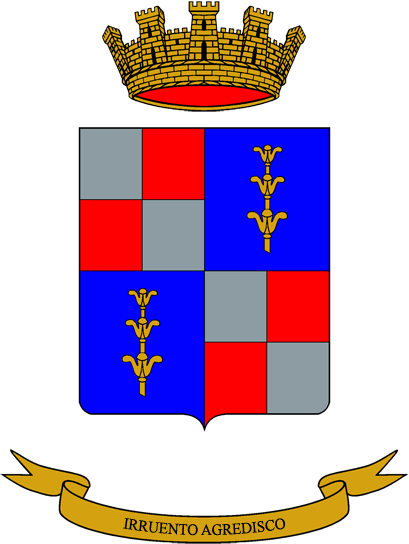
- Battalion coat of arms
- Active: 15 May 1940 — 8 Feb. 1941; 1 May 1960 — 17 Oct. 1992
- Country: Italy
- Branch: Italian Army
- Part of: Mechanized Brigade "Pinerolo"
- Garrison/HQ: Altamura
- Motto(s): "Irruento aggredisco"
- Anniversaries: 1 October 1927

Insignia
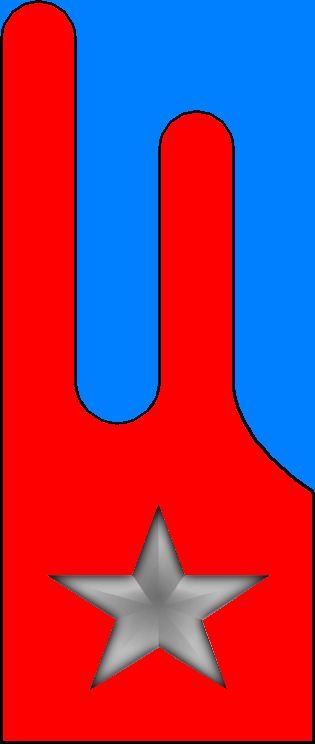
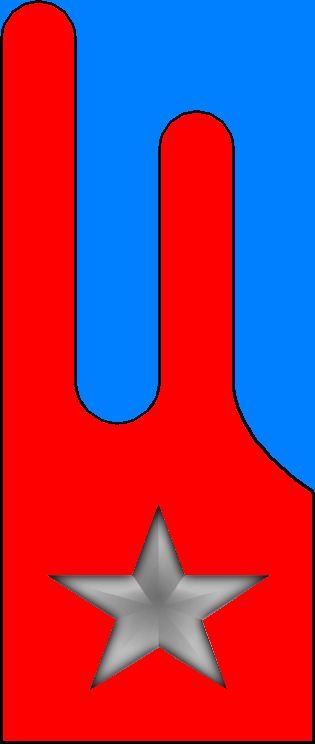
- Tank units gorget patches

The 60th Tank Battalion "M.O. Locatelli" (Italian: 60° Battaglione Carri "M.O. Locatelli") is an inactive tank battalion of the Italian Army, which was based in Altamura in Apulia and last operationally assigned to the Mechanized Brigade "Pinerolo". The unit's lineage traces back to the World War II LX Tank Battalion L, which in 1940-41 fought in the Western Desert campaign and was destroyed during Operation Compass in the Battle of Beda Fomm. In 1960, the battalion was reformed and assigned to the Infantry Division "Avellino". In 1965, the battalion was transferred to the Infantry Brigade "Pinerolo". In 1975, the battalion was renamed 60th Armored Battalion "M.O. Locatelli" and in 1979 it was rename 60th Tank Battalion "M.O. Locatelli". In September 1992, the battalion lost its autonomy and entered the 60th Tank Regiment "M.O. Locatelli". Already one month later the regiment was renamed 133rd Tank Regiment and the flag of the 60th Tank Regiment "M.O. Locatelli" was transferred to the Shrine of the Flags in the Vittoriano in Rome.

Originally the unit, like all Italian tank units, was part of the army's infantry arm, but on 1 June 1999 the tankers specialty was transferred from the infantry arm to the cavalry arm. The battalion's anniversary falls, as for all tank units, which have not yet distinguished themselves in battle, on 1 October 1927, the day the tankers speciality was founded.

== History ==
=== World War II ===
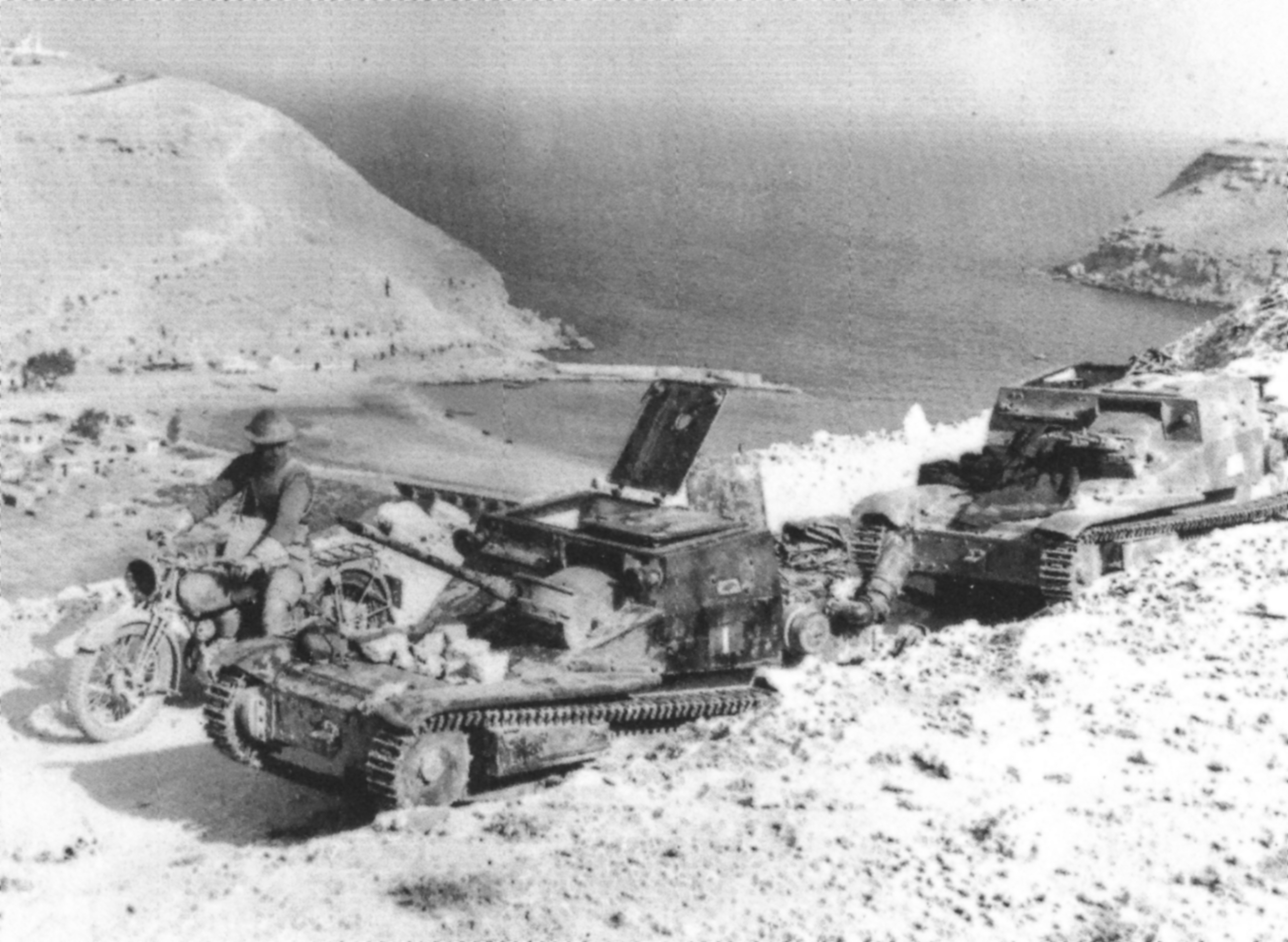
Abandoned L3/35 tankettes in Bardia after the Italian surrender

On 15 May 1940, the LX Tank Battalion L (with L standing for Italian: "Leggero" or Light) was formed in Tripolitania Libya and assigned to the 60th Infantry Division "Sabratha". The battalion was equipped with obsolete L3/35 tankettes. On 20 July 1940, the battalion moved to the Cyrenaica and was assigned to the 61st Infantry Division "Sirte". On 30 August 1940, the battalion transferred one of its companies to the Mixed Tank Battalion of the Maletti Group, while the battalion itself was assigned to the XXI Army Corps. In early December 1940, the battalion was assigned to the Special Armored Brigade, with which it fought during the British Operation Compass. After the Italian defeat in the Battle of Sidi Barrani, the fall of Bardia and the British capture of Tobruk the Special Armored Brigade, which tried to stop the British offensive on 24 January at Derna and Mechili. However in the night of 28/29 January Italian forces disengaged and, with the Special Armored Brigade acting as rearguard, retreated West to Benghazi.

On 5 February 1941, the Italian forces retreated from Benghazi and the LX Tank Battalion formed again the rearguard. On 6 February, the retreating Italian formations found their escape route blocked by the British Combeforce at Beda Fomm and in the ensuing Battle of Beda Fomm the last remnants of the Italian 10th Army, including the LX Tank Battalion L, were annihilated. On 8 February 1941, the LX Tank Battalion L was declared lost due to wartime events.

=== Cold War ===
On 1 May 1960, the Armored Battalion "Avellino" was formed in Salerno and assigned to the Infantry Division "Avellino", which during the same year was reduced to Infantry Brigade "Avellino". The battalion consisted of a command company, two tank companies, which were equipped with a mix of M24 Chaffee light and M47 Patton medium tanks, and one mechanized fusiliers company. In 1961 the battalion received M26 Pershing tanks and was renamed LX Armored Battalion "Avellino". On 25 March 1965, the LX Armored Battalion "Avellino" in Salerno was transferred to the 3rd Armored Infantry Regiment and redesignated IX Tank Battalion, while on the same date the 3rd Armored Infantry Regiment's IX Tank Battalion in Altamura was redesignated as LX Armored Battalion "Avellino" and assigned to the Infantry Brigade "Avellino". On 1 October 1965, the Infantry Brigade "Avellino" was disbanded and the LX Armored Battalion was transferred to the Infantry Brigade "Pinerolo".

During the 1975 army reform the army disbanded the regimental level and newly independent battalions were granted for the first time their own flags, respectively in the case of cavalry units, their own standard. On 1 November 1975, the LX Armored Battalion was renamed 60th Armored Battalion "M.O. Locatelli". As part of the reform tank and armored battalions were named for officers, soldiers and partisans of the tank speciality, who had served in World War II and been awarded Italy's highest military honor the Gold Medal of Military Valor. The 60th Armored Battalion was named for Lieutenant Giuseppe Locatelli, who as commander of the 1st Company, I Tank Battalion M11/39 was killed in action on 19 November 1940 to the South of Sidi Barrani.

The battalion was assigned to the Motorized Brigade "Pinerolo" and consisted of a command, a command and services company, two tank companies with M47 Patton tanks, and a mechanized company with M113 armored personnel carriers. The battalion fielded now 536 men (34 officers, 83 non-commissioned officers, and 419 soldiers). On 12 November 1976, the President of the Italian Republic Giovanni Leone granted with decree 846 the 60th Armored Battalion "M.O. Locatelli" its flag.

In 1979 the Motorized Brigade "Pinerolo" was reorganized as Mechanized Brigade "Pinerolo" and consequently, on 1 February 1979, the 60th Armored Battalion "M.O. Locatelli" was renamed 60th Tank Battalion "M.O. Locatelli". The battalion consisted now of a command, a command and services company, and three tank companies with M47 Patton tanks and fielded 434 men (32 officers, 82 non-commissioned officers, and 320 soldiers). In 1989, the battalion replaced its M47 Patton tanks with Leopard 1A2 main battle tanks.

=== Recent times ===
On 28 September 1992, the 60th Tank Battalion "M.O. Locatelli" lost its autonomy and the next day the battalion entered the newly formed 60th Tank Regiment "M.O. Locatelli". On 17 October 1992, the 60th Tank Regiment "M.O. Locatelli" was renamed 133rd Tank Regiment and the flag of the 60th Tank Regiment "M.O. Locatelli" was transferred to the Shrine of the Flags in the Vittoriano in Rome for safekeeping.

== See also ==
- Mechanized Brigade "Pinerolo"
