= Bresso Airfield =

Bresso Airfield Aeroporto G. Clerici
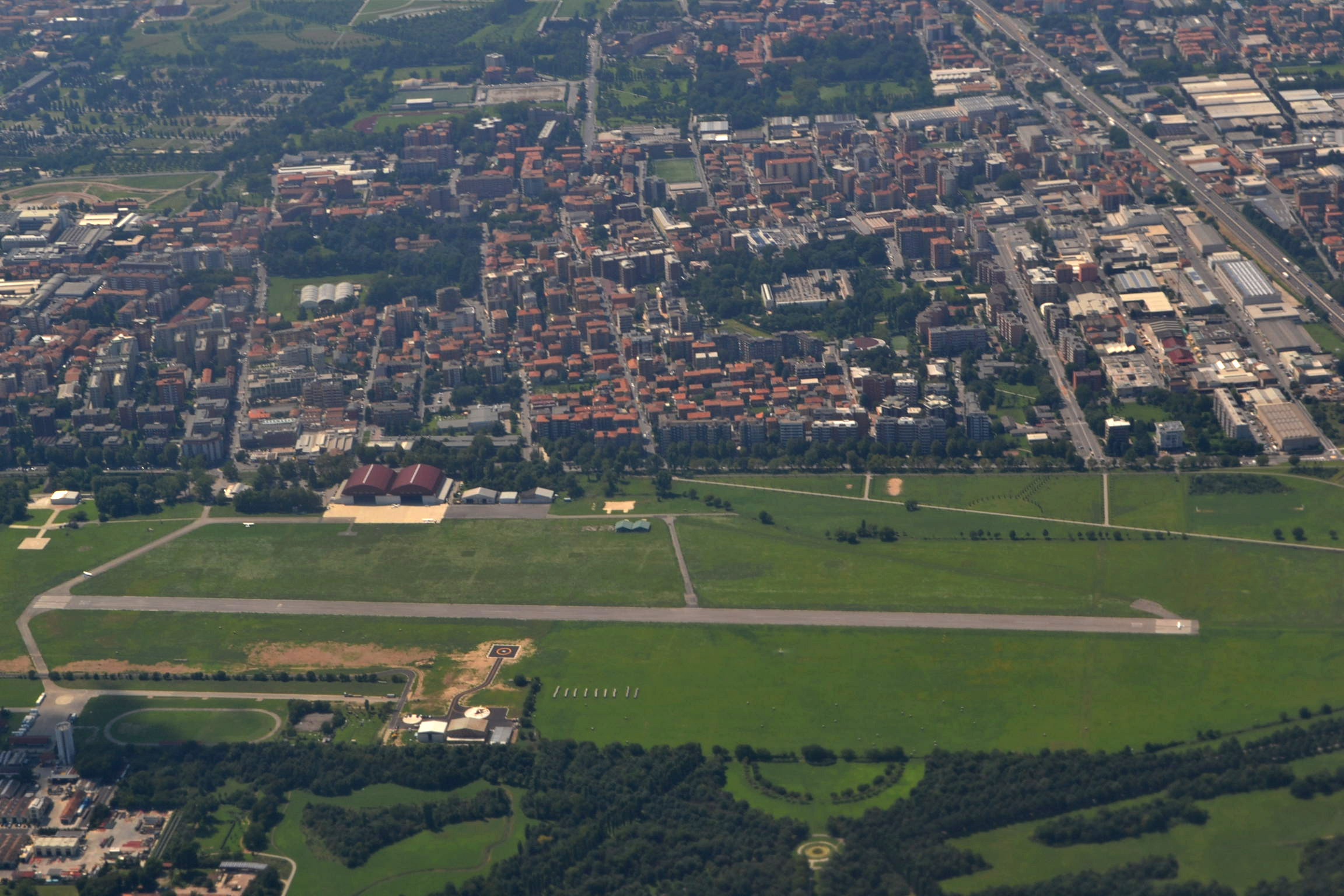
- Aerial view of the aerodrome
- IATA: none; ICAO: LIMB

Summary
- Airport type: Public
- Serves: Milan, Italy
- Location: Bresso
- Opened: 1912
- Elevation AMSL: 146 m / 479 ft
- Coordinates: 45°32′22″N 009°12′08″E

Map
- Location of aerodrome on map of Milan Location of aerodrome on map of Lombardy Location of Lombardy region in Italy

Runways
Direction	Length		Surface
Direction	m	ft	Surface
18/36	1,080	3,543	Asphalt

Bresso Airfield (Italian: Aeroporto di Bresso, ICAO: LIMB), also known as Aeroporto Giampiero Clerici, is an aerodrome in Bresso, in the Milan metropolitan area.

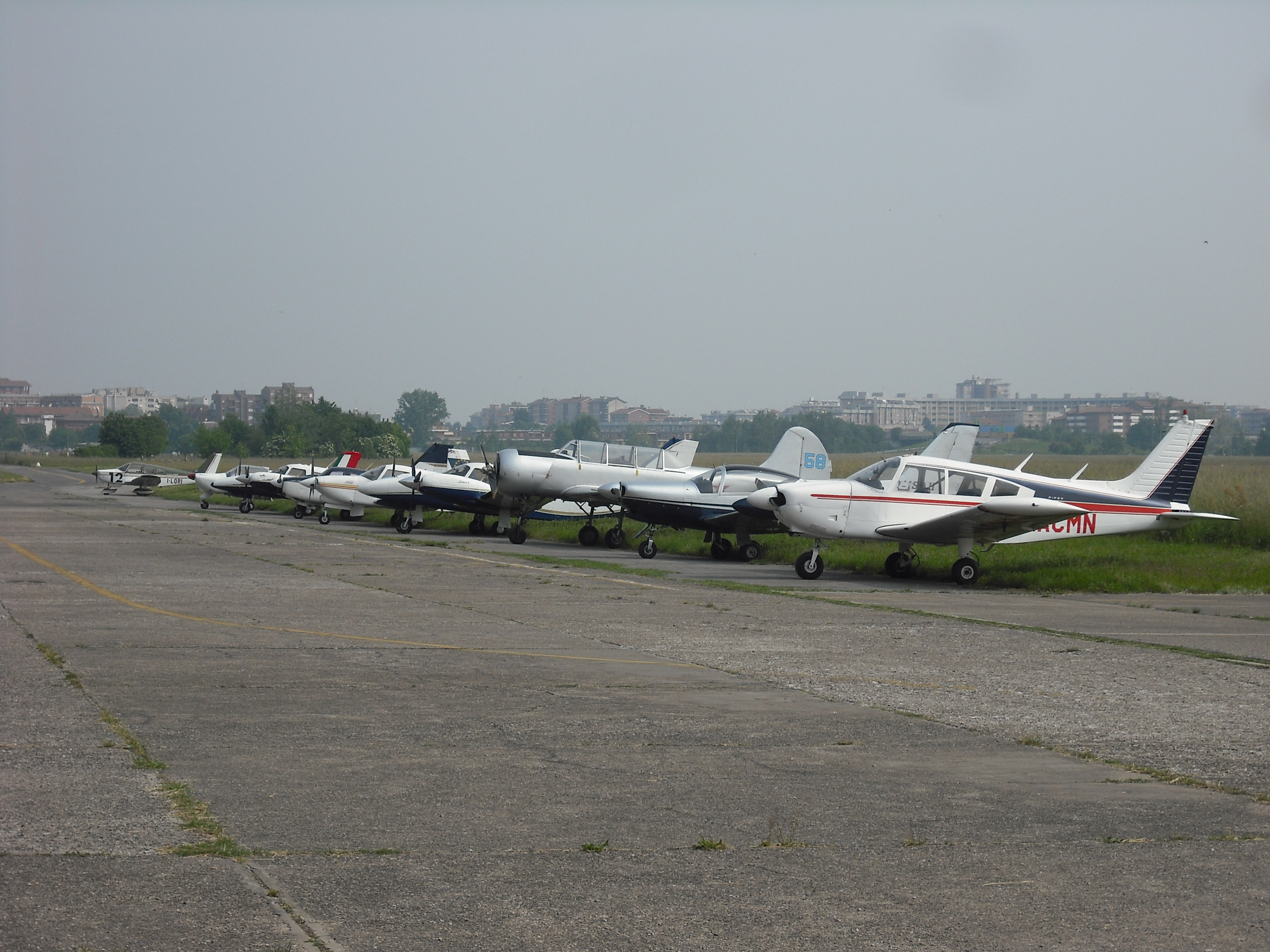
Light aircraft parked at Bresso Airport

Originally built in 1912, the field served as a factory airfield until the nearby Breda factory expanded its production to military aircraft for World War I. From 1931 to 1933 it housed the Regia Aeronautica's Terzo Stormo. On April 30, 1944, the Breda factory and the airfield were heavily bombed by 53 American Boeing B-17. Seven aircraft and a few hangars went completely destroyed. At the end of World War II the airport was mostly used as a military flying training camp and to field fighter aircraft as part of the defence system of the city.

In 1960, it became the permanent site of the Aero Club Milano. Since then the airport mostly serves as a general aviation airfield for flying club activity, touristic flights and air taxi. It also hosts a base of the state helicopter emergency service Elisoccorso.

On June 3, 2012, on the occasion of the seventh World Meeting of Families promoted by the Catholic Church, Pope Benedict XVI celebrated a mass on the tarmac in front of a million of pilgrims.

== Runway ==
The airport runway is 1,080 metres (3,540 ft) long and 30 metres (98 ft) wide. It has a magnetic orientation (QFU) 36/18.
