= 133rd Tank Regiment =

Inactive Italian Army tank unit

- 133° Reggimento Carri
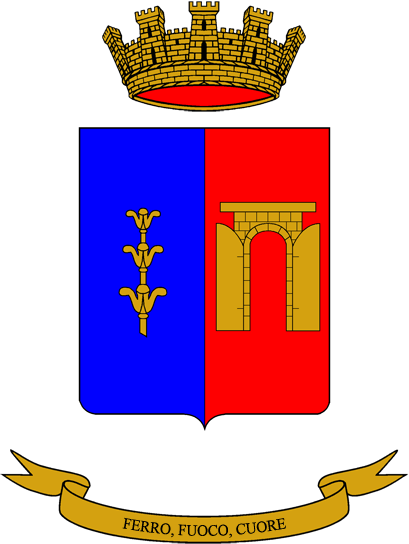
- Regimental coat of arms
- Active: 1 June 1941 — 8 Dec. 1942; 1 Nov. 1975 — 31 Jan. 1991; 18 Oct. 1992 — 9 Oct. 1995
- Country: Italy
- Branch: Italian Army
- Part of: Mechanized Brigade "Pinerolo"
- Garrison/HQ: Altamura
- Mottos: "Ferro, Fuoco, Cuore"
- Anniversaries: 1 October 1927

Insignia
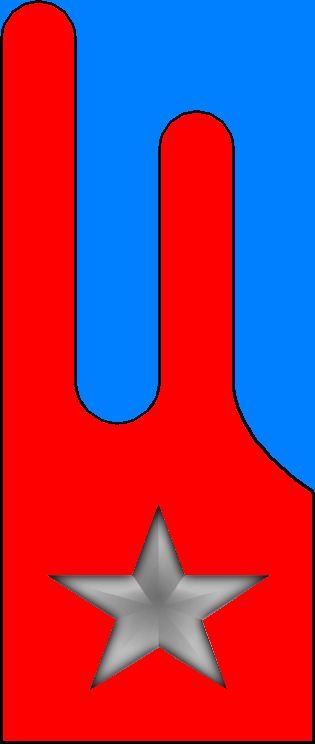
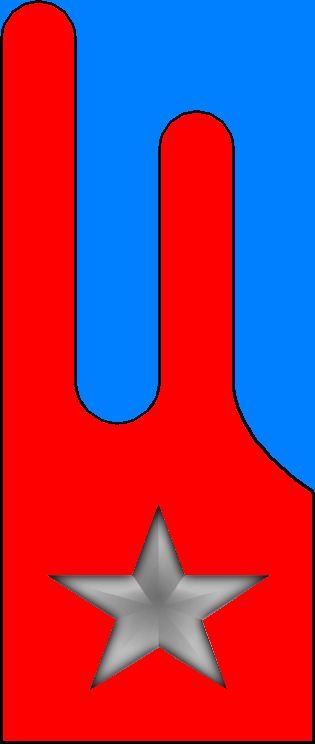
- Tank units gorget patches

The 133rd Tank Regiment (Italian: 133° Reggimento Carri) is an inactive tank regiment of the Italian Army, which was based in Altamura in Apulia and last operationally assigned to the Mechanized Brigade "Pinerolo". The regiment was formed in June 1941 by the Royal Italian Army and assigned to the 133rd Armored Division "Littorio". In March 1942, the regiment was sent to Libya, where it fought in the Western Desert campaign. In November 1942, the regiment was destroyed during the Second Battle of El Alamein.

In 1976, the regiment's flag and traditions were assigned to the 10th Tank Battalion "M.O. Bruno", which had become an autonomous unit on 1 November 1975 and been assigned to the 132nd Armored Brigade "Manin". In 1991, the 10th Tank Battalion "M.O. Bruno" was disbanded the flag of the 133rd Tank Infantry Regiment was transferred to the Shrine of the Flags in the Vittoriano in Rome for safekeeping. In 1992, the regiment was reformed by renaming the 60th Tank Regiment "M.O. Locatelli". In 1995, the regiment was disbanded and its base, personnel, and materiel taken over by the 31st Tank Regiment. Originally the unit, like all Italian tank units, was part of the army's infantry arm, but on 1 June 1999 the tankers specialty was transferred from the infantry arm to the cavalry arm. The regiment's anniversary falls, as for all tank units, which have not yet distinguished themselves in the battle, on 1 October 1927, the day the tankers speciality was founded.

== History ==
=== World War II ===
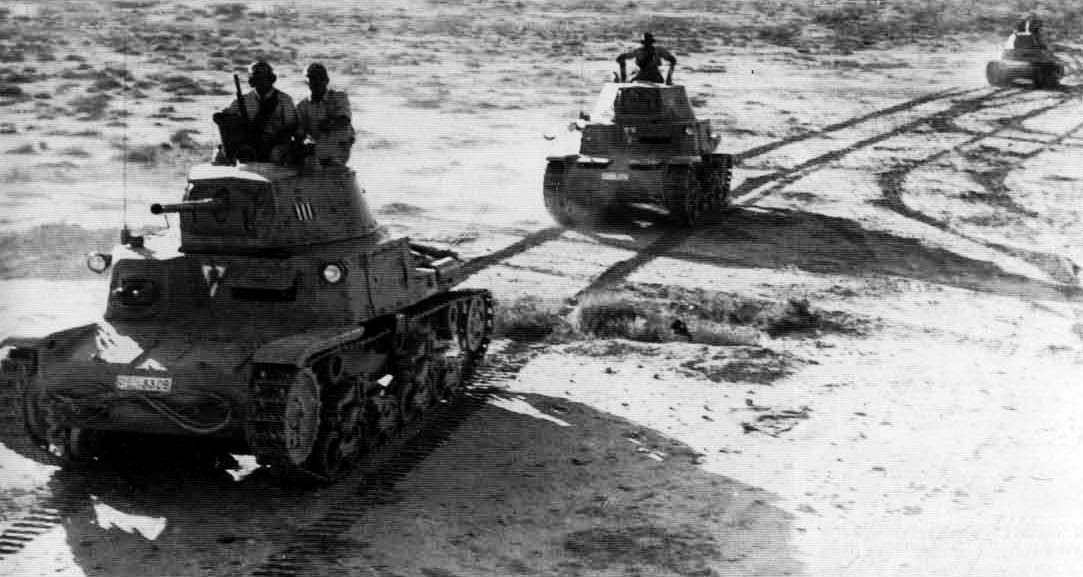
M14/41 tanks during the Western Desert campaign

On 1 June 1941, the depot of the 33rd Tank Infantry Regiment in Parma formed the command of the 133rd Tank Infantry Regiment. Over the course of June, the newly formed regiment received three battalions equipped with M13/40 tanks: the X Tank Battalion M13/40 from the 1st Tank Infantry Regiment, the XI Tank Battalion M13/40 from the 4th Tank Infantry Regiment, and the newly formed XII Tank Battalion M13/40. On 27 November 1941, the regiment was assigned to the 133rd Armored Division "Littorio" as replacement for the 33rd Tank Infantry Regiment. In December 1941, the XII Tank Battalion M13/40 was sent to Libya to reinforce the German-Italian Panzer Group Africa. However, on 13 December 1941, the ships Carlo del Greco and Fabio Filzi, which transported the tanks of the battalion, were torpedoed and sunk by the Royal Navy submarine HMS Upright off Capo San Vito. Due to this the XII Tank Battalion M13/40, which was waiting at Naples for the transfer to Libya by airplane, returned to the regimental depot in Parma, where the battalion was equipped with newer M14/41 tanks. Consequently, the battalion was renamed XII Tank Battalion M14/41.

By March 1942, the 133rd Tank Infantry Regiment had reached Libya, where it received the LI Tank Battalion M14/41 from the 31st Tank Infantry Regiment. On 21 April 1942, the X Tank Battalion M13/40 was transferred to the 132nd Tank Infantry Regiment and the regiment received the IV Tank Battalion M14/41 from the 31st Tank Infantry Regiment as replacement. On 15 May 1942, the XI Tank Battalion M13/40 was transferred to the 101st Motorized Division "Trieste". On 31 May 1942, the regiment began its move to the front. On 15 June 1942, the XII Tank Battalion M14/41 disembarked in Al-Khums in Libya and on 22 June the battalion arrived in Tobruk, where it joined the regiment. The regiment then consisted now of the following units:

- 133rd Tank Infantry Regiment
  - IV Tank Battalion M14/41, with M14/41 tanks
  - XII Tank Battalion M14/41, with M14/41 tanks
  - LI Tank Battalion M14/41, with M14/41 tanks
  - Anti-aircraft Company, with 20/65 Mod. 35 anti-aircraft guns

On 20 June 1942, the regiment had its baptism of fire during the Axis capture of Tobruk. The regiment then fought in the Battle of Mersa Matruh, First Battle of El Alamein, and Battle of Alam el Halfa. On 23 October 1942, the Second Battle of El Alamein commenced, during which the 101st Motorized Division "Trieste", 132nd Armored Division "Ariete", and 133rd Armored Division "Littorio" were destroyed on 4 November by an attack of the British 1st Armoured Division, 7th Armoured Division and 10th Armoured Division. On 8 December 1942, the 133rd Tank Infantry Regiment and its battalions were declared as lost due to wartime events.

The few survivors of the 132nd Tank Infantry Regiment, 133rd Tank Infantry Regiment, and XI Tank Battalion M13/40 were grouped together in the "Cantaluppi" Group, an ad hoc formation commanded by Colonel Gaetano Cantaluppi. On 5 December 1942, the group was reorganized as 132nd Anti-tank Regiment. The regiment was assigned to the 131st Armored Division "Centauro", with which it fought in the Tunisian campaign. The regiment was declared lost due to wartime events on 18 April 1943 after the Battle of El Guettar.

=== Cold War ===
On 10 July 1948, the Tank School in Rome reformed the 1st Tankers Regiment, which, on 1 April 1949, was renamed 132nd Tankers Regiment. On 1 March 1952, the regiment reformed the III Tank Battalion, which, on 1 February 1959, was renamed X Tank Battalion and assigned the traditions of the X Tank Battalion M13/40.

During the 1975 army reform the army disbanded the regimental level and newly independent battalions were granted for the first time their own flags, respectively in the case of cavalry units, their own standard. On 31 October 1975, the 132nd Tank Regiment was disbanded and the next day the regiment's X Tank Battalion in Aviano became an autonomous unit and was renamed 10th Tank Battalion "M.O. Bruno". As part of the reform tank and armored battalions were named for officers, soldiers and partisans of the tank speciality, who had served in World War II and been awarded Italy's highest military honor the Gold Medal of Military Valor. The 10th Tank Battalion was named for Second Lieutenant Pietro Bruno, who served as a platoon commander in the 1st Company, X Tank Battalion M13/40, 132nd Tank Infantry Regiment and was killed in action on 4 November 1942 during the Second Battle of El Alamein.

The battalion was assigned to the 132nd Armored Brigade "Manin" and consisted of a command, a command and services company, and three tank companies with M60A1 Patton main battle tanks. The battalion fielded now 434 men (32 officers, 82 non-commissioned officers, and 320 soldiers). On 12 November 1976, the President of the Italian Republic Giovanni Leone assigned with decree 846 the flag and traditions of the 133rd Tank Infantry Regiment to the 10th Tank Battalion "M.O. Bruno".

In 1986, the Italian Army abolished the divisional level and brigades, which until then had been under one of the Army's four divisions, came forthwith under direct command of the Army's 3rd Army Corps or 5th Army Corps. As the Armored Division "Ariete" carried a historically significant name, the division ceased to exist on 30 September in Pordenone and the next day in the same location the 132nd Armored Brigade "Ariete" was activated. The new brigade took command of the units of the 132nd Armored Brigade "Manin", whose name was stricken from the roll of active units of the Italian Army.

=== Recent times ===
After the end of the Cold War Italian Army began to draw down its forces and, on 31 January 1991, the 10th Tank Battalion "M.O. Bruno" was disbanded. On 20 February of the same year, the flag of the 133rd Tank Regiment was transferred to the Shrine of the Flags in the Vittoriano in Rome for safekeeping. On 28 September 1991, the 60th Tank Battalion "M.O. Locatelli" in Altamura lost its autonomy and the next day, on 29 September 1991, the battalion entered the newly formed 60th Tank Regiment "M.O. Locatelli". The regiment was equipped with Leopard 1A2 main battle tanks and assigned to the Mechanized Brigade "Pinerolo". On 17 October 1992, the 60th Tank Regiment "M.O. Locatelli" was renamed 133rd Tank Regiment and the flag of the 60th Tank Regiment "M.O. Locatelli" was transferred to the Shrine of the Flags in the Vittoriano.

On 8 October 1995, the 4th Tank Regiment disbanded its companies in Civitavecchia and the next day, on 9 October 1995, the flag of the 4th Tank Regiment arrived in Bellinzago Novarese, where it replaced the flag of the 31st Tank Regiment. On the same date, 9 October 1995, the 133rd Tank Regiment was reduced to reserve unit, which was to be formed in case of war by the Tank School in Lecce. The next day, on 10 October 1995, the flag of the 31st Tank Regiment arrived in Altamura, where it took over the base, personnel, and materiel of the 133rd Tank Regiment. Afterwards, on 26 October 1995, the flag of the 133rd Tank Regiment was once more transferred to the Shrine of the Flags in the Vittoriano.

== See also ==
- Mechanized Brigade "Pinerolo"
