= Mechanized Brigade "Pinerolo" =

- Brigata Meccanizata "Pinerolo"
- Coat of Arms of the Mechanized Brigade "Pinerolo"
- Active: 13 November 1831 – 25 October 1871; Brigade "Pinerolo" 2 January 1881 – 11 March 1926; Brigade "Pinerolo"; 11 March 1926 – 1934; XXIV Infantry Brigade; 1934–1939; 24th Infantry Brigade "Gran Sasso"; 1939 – 10 September 1943; 24th Infantry Division "Pinerolo"; 15 April 1952 – 1 September 1962; Infantry Division "Pinerolo"; 1 September 1962 – 31 October 1975; Infantry Brigade "Pinerolo"; 1 November 1975 – 31 January 1979; Motorized Brigade "Pinerolo"; 1 February 1979 – 1997; Mechanized Brigade "Pinerolo"; 1997 – 31 September 2011; Armored Brigade "Pinerolo" 1 October 2011 – today Mechanized Brigade "Pinerolo"
- Country: Italy
- Branch: Italian Army
- Role: Infantry
- Size: Brigade
- Part of: Division "Acqui"
- Garrison/HQ: Bari
- Colors: orange
- Engagements: World War I World War II; Bosnia SFOR; Kosovo KFOR

The Mechanized Brigade "Pinerolo" (Italian: Brigata Meccanizata "Pinerolo") is a mechanized infantry brigade of the Italian Army, based in the southern region of Apulia. Carrying the name of the Piedmontese city of Pinerolo the brigade's coat of arms was modeled after the city's coat of arms. The brigade is part of the Division "Acqui".

== History ==
=== 1831 to 1914 ===
After Charles Albert of Sardinia ascended to the throne of the Kingdom of Sardinia on 27 April 1831 a major reform of the military was undertaken. Thus on 13 November 1831 the Brigade "Pinerolo" was raised with two infantry regiments. These two regiments were the "His Royal Highness' Regiment of Saluzzo" (Italian: Reggimento di Saluzzo di Sua Altezza Reale) founded in 1672 as Regiment "Lullin" and a new regiment split formed with troops of its sister regiment. From 1 November 1815 to 1821 the "HRH Regiment of Saluzzo" was known as Brigade "Saluzzo" (Italian: Brigata "Saluzzo") and based in the city of Saluzzo. From 1821 to 13 November 1831 the brigade was known as "Brigade of Pinerolo" (Italian: Brigata di Pinerolo) and based in Genoa, however in size and function both brigades were akin to an infantry regiment with two battalions. After the founding of the "Pinerolo" Brigade its two regiments consisted of three battalions each: the regiment's 1st and 2nd battalions fielded three companies of fusiliers and one company of grenadiers, while the third battalions consisted of four companies of skirmishers. Later a fourth battalion was added to each regiment and the companies' strength was increased. By 1839 each regiment fielded four battalions, which in turn fielded 4 companies of 250 men each. In 1839 the regiments of the "Pinerolo" were numbered and renamed as 13th Regiment Brigade "Pinerolo" and 14th Regiment Brigade "Pinerolo".

The brigade participated in the First Italian War of Independence fighting in the battles of Santa Lucia and Novara. In 1855 the brigade provided two battalions for the Sardinian Expeditionary Corps in the Crimean War. In the Second Italian War of Independence the brigade was employed in the battles of Magenta and Solferino. In the Third Italian War of Independence the brigade fought in the Battle of Custoza.

=== World War I ===
At the outbreak of World War I the brigade was based in the city of Padua with its two regiments fielding three battalions each and each of the battalions consisting of four companies and a machine gun section. On 24 May 1915 the brigade advanced to the South of Palmanova into Austrian territory until it met Austrian positions near the village of Selz. During the First Battle of the Isonzo the brigade tried to take the area of Selz and the nearby fortified hill of "Sei Busi", but managed only to capture some Austrian trenches. During the Second Battle of the Isonzo the brigade again tried to take the same two positions. The only success of the battle came on 24 July when the 14th Regiment managed to enter the Austrian trench system on "Sei Busi", but the Austrian artillery fire and counterattacks drove the regiment back to its starting position by nightfall.

Having suffered horrendous casualties in the Second Battle of the Isonzo the brigade was taken out of the front for a two-month rest. In October the brigade returned to the front to participate in the Third Battle of the Isonzo. Again the brigade tried to take "Sei Busi" and Selz and once more the brigade suffered horrendous losses. Reduced to half its strength the brigade was not employed during the Fourth Battle of the Isonzo but sent to Monfalcone to be rebuilt once again.

During the first half of 1916 the brigade was stationed on the front lines on the Karst Plateau and tasked with continuous attacks on the Austrian positions to impede the Austro-Hungarian Army from sending reinforcements to the stalled offensive on the Asiago Plateau. On 29 June 1916 the brigade managed to break Austrian defenses near Doberdò and conquer staging areas that ultimately led to the success of the Battle of Doberdò during the Sixth Battle of the Isonzo. On 14 August 1916 the brigade was ordered to conquer the mountains of Pecinka and Cerje (Veliki Hribach) near Lokvica. For three days the brigade's soldiers tried to reach the two summits, but having suffered over 2,000 dead by 17 August, the Italian Supreme Command ordered to cease combat operations.

Once again the brigade had to be rebuilt and was therefore sent to the city of Romans. However less than a month later the brigade was already back at the front for the Seventh and Eighth Battle of the Isonzo. Both times the brigade was again tasked with taking Pecinka and Veliki Hribach. Both times the brigade's battalions did not manage to enter the Austrian trenches, this feat was only achieved during the Ninth Battle of the Isonzo, when the 13th Regiment managed to break into the Austrian defenses and hold the newly conquered positions.

Until May 1917 the brigade saw little combat, alternating between front line duties and rest in the village of Hudi Log. In the Tenth Battle of the Isonzo the brigade was tasked to the take hills of Stari Lokva and Versic near Sela na Krasu. Although the first Austrian trench was taken, artillery fire forced the Italians back to their own positions. Again employed in the Eleventh Battle of the Isonzo the brigade suffered devastating casualties attacking heights 244 and 251 near the Kostanjevica Monastery.

After the Italian front was broken in the Battle of Caporetto the brigade fought rearguard actions during the Italian retreat towards the Piave river. On 30 October 1917 the command of the 14th Regiment and one of its battalions had to surrender to German troops as the rapidly advancing German and Austrian forces had already blocked all crossings over the Livenza river. The remnants of the brigade were employed in defensive battles on the lower Piave until December 1917.

On 7 April 1918 the brigade entered the front on the Asiago Plateau, where it was surprised by the Austrian attack towards Vicenza during the Battle of the Piave River. In face of the massive Austrian offensive the brigade had to abandon all its forward positions and managed to hold only its last defensive line. When the Austrian offensive became bogged down the brigade managed to recapture part of the lost territory.

When the Battle of Vittorio Veneto finally broke the Austrian Army the brigade managed to advance towards the Vezzena Pass, which it reached on 3 November 1918, just before the Armistice of Villa Giusti came into effect.

=== World War II ===
After the end of World War I the brigade moved to the Abruzzo region and was garrisoned in the city of Chieti. In 1926 the brigade gained the 225th Infantry Regiment "Arezzo" and changed its name to XXIV Infantry Brigade. Along with the 18th Artillery Regiment the brigade formed the 24th Territorial Division in Chieti. In 1934 the division and brigade gained the name "Gran Sasso" and were forthwith known as 24th Infantry Division "Gran Sasso" and XXIV Infantry Brigade "Gran Sasso". In 1935 the division was sent to Eritrea and participated in the Second Italo-Abyssinian War. The division operated in the Tigray Region and fought in the Battle of Shire.

In 1939 the brigade lost the 225th Infantry Regiment "Arezzo" and was renamed 24th Infantry Division "Pinerolo". This binary division consisted of only two infantry regiments (13th and 14th) and the 18th Field Artillery Regiment. In 1940 the division took part in the Italian invasion of France. In January 1941 the division arrived in Albania to stabilize the crumbling Italian front during the Greek counteroffensive in the Greco-Italian War.

On 18 January 1941 the division was in Berat and entered the approaching front near Këlcyrë. The division fought defensive battles for the next month ending with the defense of Tepelenë. The division participated in the Italian Spring Offensive, and participated in a small offensive towards Ohrid in Macedonia during the German-led Invasion of Yugoslavia.

In June 1941 the division transferred to Larissa in Thessaly to suppress the growing Greek Resistance movement. During its time in Thessaly the "Pinerolo" division committed the Domenikon Massacre against Greek civilians. The division continued on anti-partisan duty until the Armistice between Italy and Allied armed forces of 8 September 1943. In the confusion after the armistice the division was the only one in continental Greece to refuse German demands to surrender. While the "Piemonte", "Forlì", "Modena", "Casale" and "Cagliari" divisions surrendered to the inferior German forces the "Pinerolo" defended Larissa against German attacks and then retired towards the Pindus mountain range where it joined the Greek People's Liberation Army in fighting the Germans.

The remnants of the division were repatriated to Italy in March 1945.

=== Cold War ===
Pinerolo units in 1989

On 1 April 1952 the Infantry Division "Pinerolo" was raised again in the city of Bari. The division consisted initially of the 9th Infantry Regiment "Bari" and the 13th Infantry Regiment "Pinerolo". Both regiments fielded two battalions, one less than the other divisions of the Army at the time. The division was rounded out by the 14th Field Artillery Regiment, the 9th Engineer Company and the 9th Signal Company.

However already on 1 September 1962 the division was reduced to brigade. It consisted now of the 9th Infantry Regiment "Bari" (with three infantry battalions) and the Field Artillery Group "Pinerolo". Minor units of the brigade were a Signal Company and an Engineer company. During the next years the Supply, Repairs, Recovery Unit "Pinerolo" was raised in Bari and on 30 October 1965 the LX Armored Battalion joined the brigade.

With the 1975 army reform the Italian Army abolished the regimental level and battalions came under direct command of the brigades. Therefore, on 1 November 1975, the 9th Regiment was disbanded and its battalions came forthwith under direct command of the Motorized Brigade "Pinerolo". The new organization of the brigade was therefore:

- Motorized Brigade "Pinerolo", in Bari
  - Command and Signal Unit "Pinerolo", in Bari
  - 9th Motorized Infantry Battalion "Bari", in Trani (former I Battalion, 9th Infantry Regiment "Bari")
  - 13th Motorized Infantry Battalion "Valbella", in Avellino (former IV Battalion, 9th Infantry Regiment "Bari")
  - 67th Bersaglieri Battalion "Fagare", in Persano (former IV Bersaglieri Battalion, 3rd Armored Infantry Regiment of the disbanded Infantry Division "Granatieri di Sardegna")
  - 231st Infantry Battalion "Avellino" (Recruits Training), in Avellino (former I Armored Troops Recruits Training Battalion of the Southern Military Region)
  - 60th Armored Battalion "M.O. Locatelli", in Altamura (M47 Patton tanks and M113 APCs)
  - 47th Field Artillery Group "Gargano", in Bari (M114 155mm towed howitzers)
  - Logistic Battalion "Pinerolo", in Bari
  - Anti-tank Company "Pinerolo", in Bari (BGM-71 TOW anti-tank guided missiles)
  - Engineer Company "Pinerolo", in Trani

On 1 February 1979 the 60th Armored Battalion "M.O. Locatelli" ceded its two M113 armored personnel carrier equipped companies to the infantry battalions of the brigade and received two new tank companies. Consequently, the battalion was renamed on the same date 60th Tank Battalion "M.O. Locatelli". Additionally the battalion was equipped with new Leopard 1A2 tanks and the brigade's infantry battalions were equipped with VCC-1 armored personnel carriers. Therefore, on 1 February 1979 the brigade was renamed Mechanized Brigade "Pinerolo", and on 8 October 1980 the brigade's infantry battalions changed their designation from motorized to mechanized. In 1981 47th Field Artillery Group "Gargano" was disbanded and replaced in the same location by the 11th Field Artillery Group "Teramo". The "Teramo" later replaced its M114 155/23 towed howitzers with M109 self-propelled howitzers.

=== Recent history ===
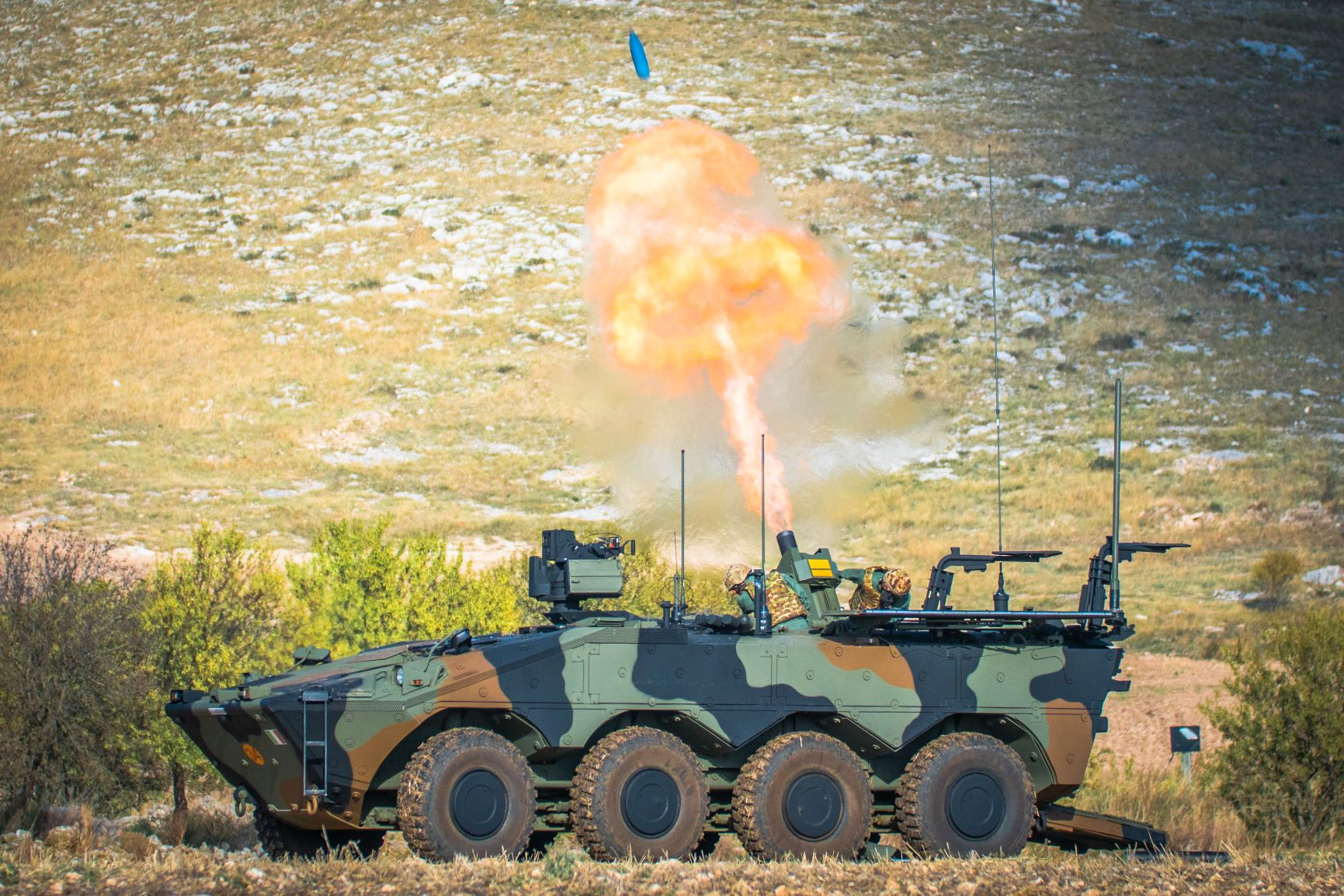
82nd Infantry Regiment "Torino" Freccia mortar carrier

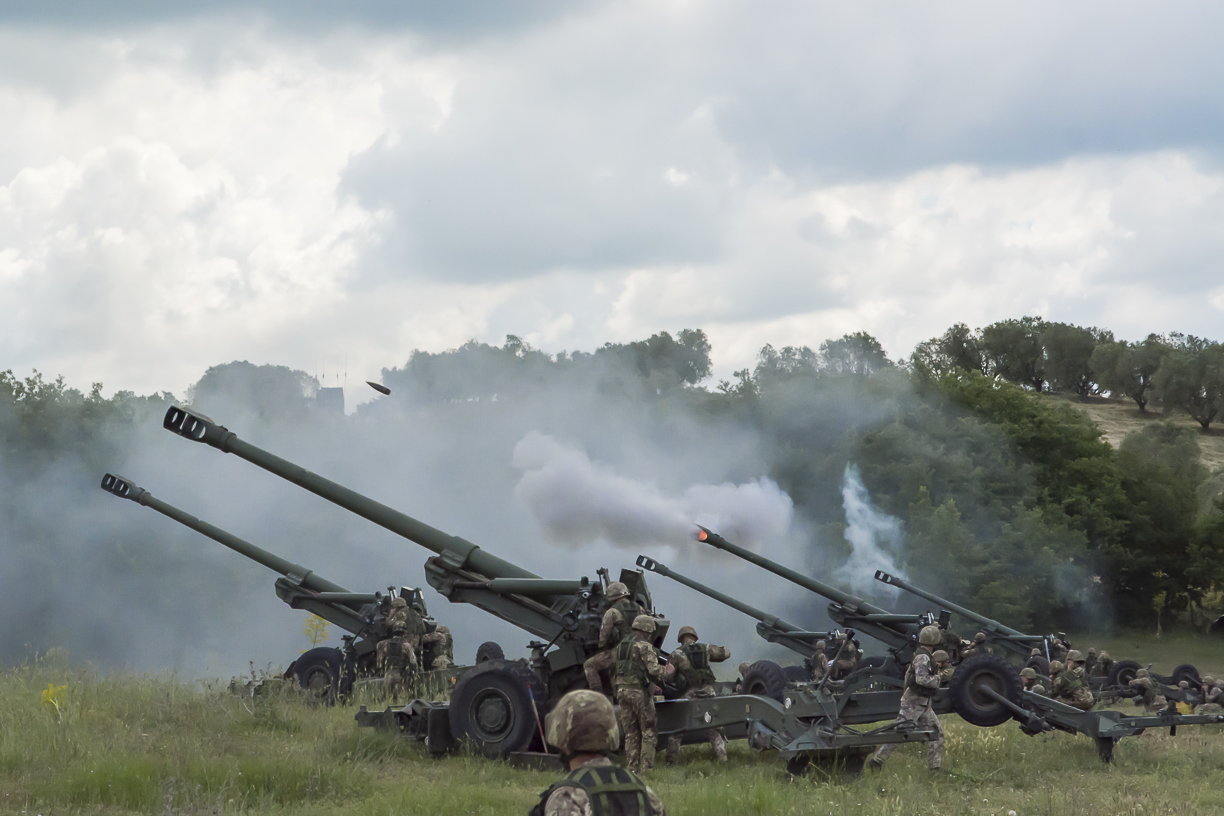
21st Field Artillery Regiment "Trieste" FH-70 howitzer battery

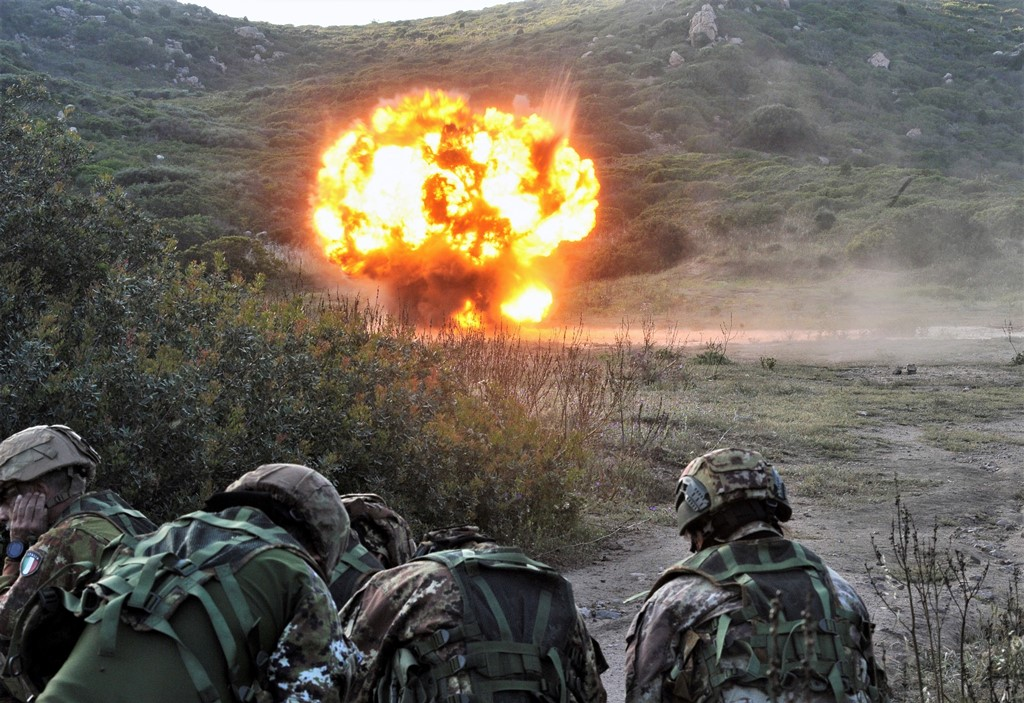
11th Engineer Regiment during an exercise

In the early 1990s the battalions returned to their traditional regimental names. I.e. on 30 September 1992 the 9th Mechanized Infantry Battalion "Bari" was renamed 9th Infantry Regiment "Bari" without changing composition or size. On 31 December 1990 the Army wide reduction in forces after the end of the Cold War reached the "Pinerolo" brigade with the disbanding of the 13th Mechanized Infantry Battalion "Valbella". On 1 July 1991 the brigade lost the 67th Bersaglieri Battalion "Fagarè" and the 11th Self-propelled Field Artillery Regiment "Teramo" to the Bersaglieri Brigade "Garibaldi". The 11th Self-propelled Artillery Regiment was replaced by the 2nd Self-propelled Artillery Regiment "Potenza" in Barletta.

On 17 October 1992 the 60th Tank Battalion "M.O. Locatelli" was renamed 133rd Tank Regiment without changing size or composition. On 21 October 1992 the headquarters of the 11th Bersaglieri Battalion "Caprera" (formerly part of the Bersaglieri Brigade "Garibaldi") moved from Orcenico Superiore to Bari and joined the Pinerolo as core of the to-be-formed 7th Bersaglieri Regiment.

On 9 October 1995 the 31st Tank Regiment in Bellinzago Novarese received the war flag and name of the 4th Tank Regiment and transferred its own name and war flag to the 133rd Tank Regiment in Altamura, while on the same date the war flag of the 133rd Tank Regiment was transferred to the army's Tank School in Lecce, where it was stored in the commander's office, until, in case of war, the personnel of the Cavalry School would have formed the 133rd Tank Regiment. On 10 October 1995 the 131st Self-propelled Field Artillery Regiment "Centauro" received the war flag and name of the 52nd Self-propelled Artillery Regiment "Torino" from the disbanding Mechanized Brigade "Legnano" and transferred its own name and war flag to the 2nd Self-propelled Artillery Regiment "Potenza" in Barletta. On 20 May 1996 the 131st Artillery Regiment moved to Foggia and on 3 December of the same year the Pinerolo, which fielded now two tank regiments, was renamed: Armored Brigade "Pinerolo". On 18 April 1997 the 11th Bersaglieri Battalion "Caprera" of the 7th Bersaglieri Regiment was renamed 10th Bersaglieri Battalion "Bezzecca". By the end of 1997 the brigade's composition was as follows:

- Armored Brigade "Pinerolo", in Bari
  - Command and Tactical Supports Unit "Pinerolo", in Bari
  - 7th Bersaglieri Regiment, in Bari
  - 9th Infantry Regiment "Bari", in Trani
  - 47th Infantry Regiment "Ferrara" (Recruits Training), in Barletta
  - 31st Tank Regiment, in Altamura
  - 133rd Tank Regiment (Reserve), in Lecce
  - 131st Self-propelled Field Artillery Regiment "Centauro", in Foggia
  - Logistic Battalion "Pinerolo", in Bari

The following years brought additional changes: In March 2001 the 131st Self-propelled Field Artillery Regiment "Centauro" was renamed 21st Self-propelled Field Artillery Regiment "Trieste", which had transferred from the Airmobile Brigade "Friuli". On 5 November 2001 the 82nd Infantry Regiment "Torino" from the 132nd Armored Brigade "Ariete" moved to Barletta and joined the "Pinerolo". During the same year the 11th Engineer Regiment moved from Motta di Livenza in the north of Italy to Foggia and joined the Pinerolo, while the 133rd Tank Regiment was disbanded.

== Organization ==
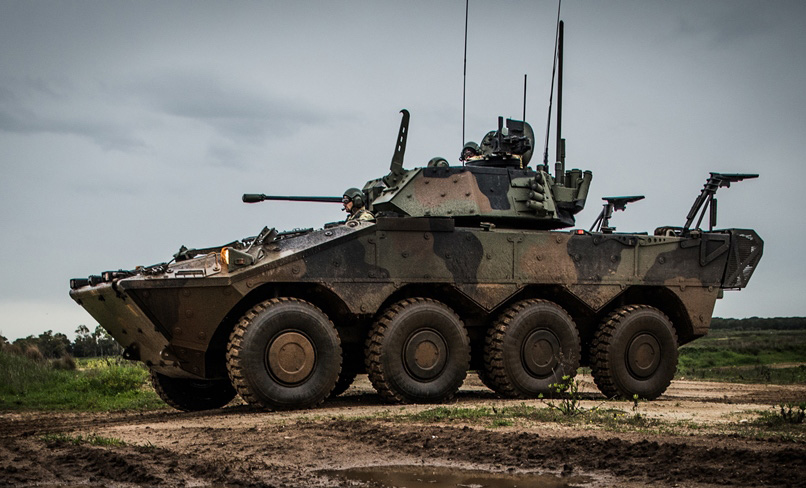
Freccia of the brigade

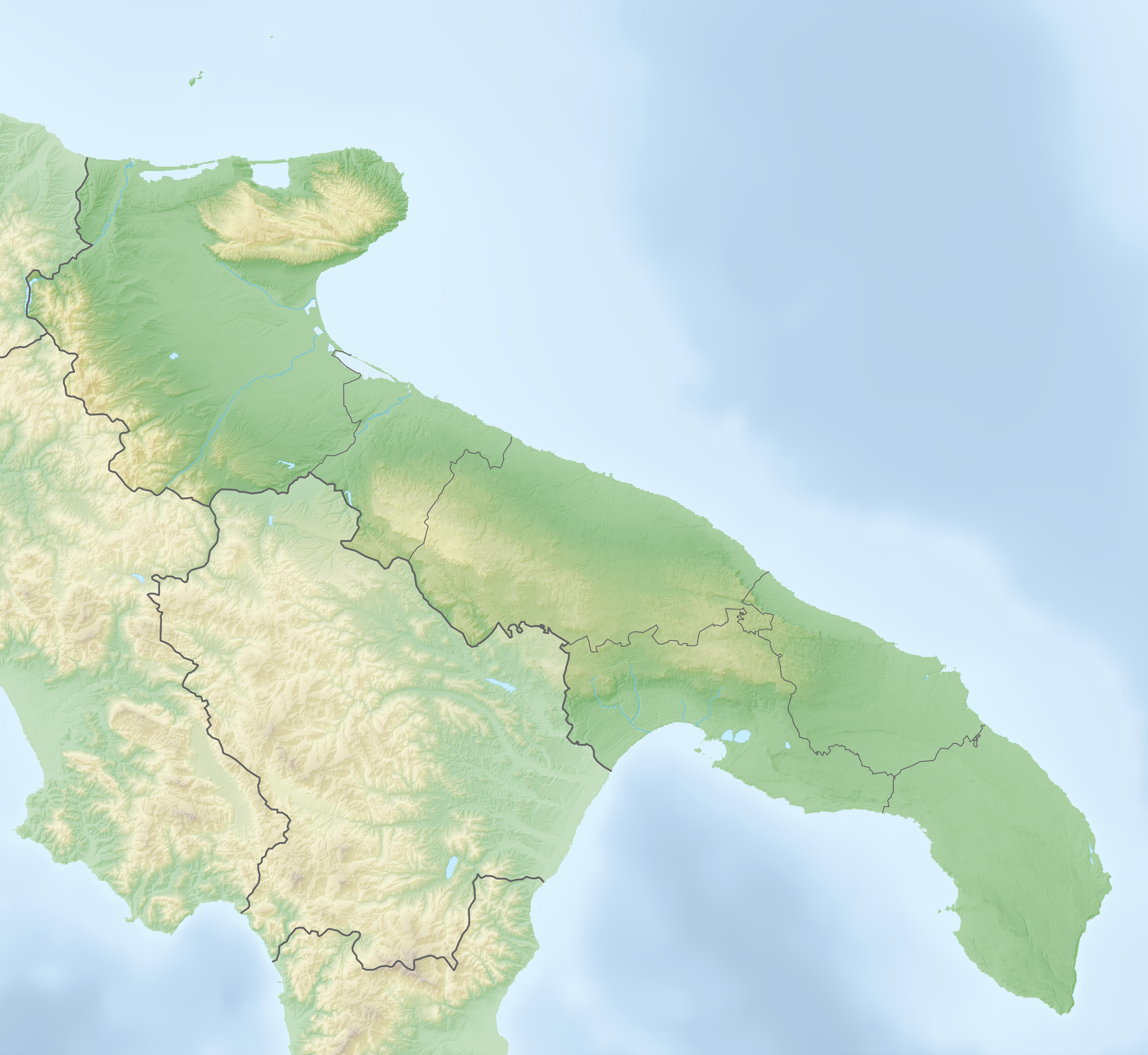
Mechanized Brigade "Pinerolo" units in 2025

On 1 January 2011 the 31st Tank Regiment moved to Lecce and joined to the Cavalry School. Subsequently, the brigade was renamed Mechanized Brigade "Pinerolo" on 1 October 2011. In 2013 the brigade received the Logistic Regiment "Pinerolo" and on 28 February 2017 the 31st Tank Regiment returned to the "Pinerolo". On 10 January 2020 the 31st Tank Regiment was reorganized as Regiment "Cavalleggeri di Lodi" (15th).

As of July 2025 the brigade is organized as follows:

- Mechanized Brigade "Pinerolo", in Bari
  - 13th Command and Tactical Supports Unit "Pinerolo", in Bari
  - Regiment "Cavalleggeri di Lodi" (15th), in Lecce (Centauro tank destroyers)
  - 7th Bersaglieri Regiment, in Altamura (Freccia infantry fighting vehicles)
  - 9th Infantry Regiment "Bari", in Trani (Freccia infantry fighting vehicles)
  - 82nd Infantry Regiment "Torino", in Barletta (Freccia infantry fighting vehicles)
  - 21st Field Artillery Regiment "Trieste", in Foggia (FH-70 towed howitzers)
  - 11th Engineer Regiment, in Foggia
  - Logistic Regiment "Pinerolo", in Bari

All regiments are battalion sized.

== Equipment ==
The cavalry regiment is equipped with Centauro and Centauro 2 tank destroyers. The Bersaglieri and the two infantry regiments are equipped with Freccia wheeled infantry fighting vehicles. The brigade's artillery regiment fields 18x FH-70 towed howitzers.

== Gorget patches ==
The personnel of the brigade's units wears the following gorget patches:

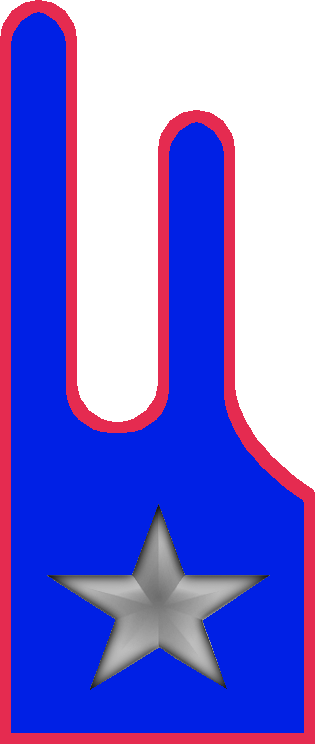
13th Command and Tactical Supports Unit "Pinerolo"

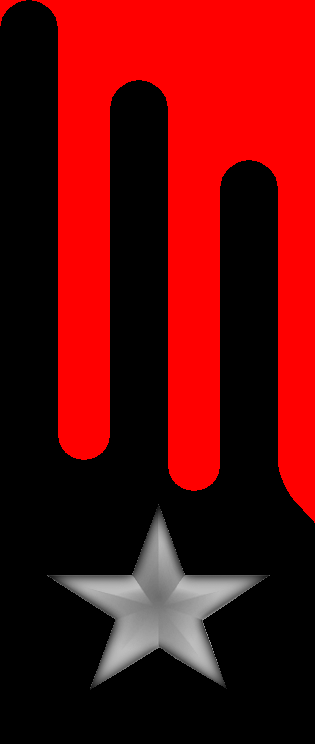
Regiment "Cavalleggeri di Lodi" (15th)

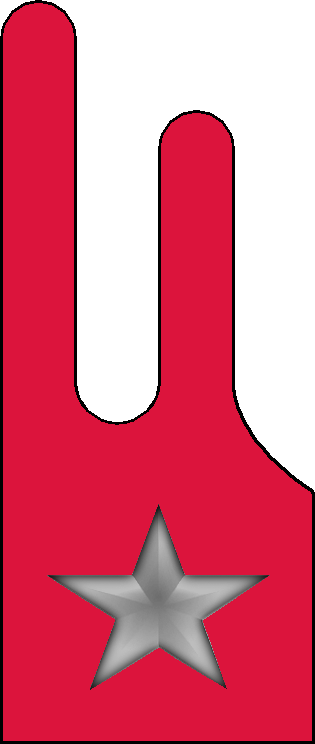
7th Bersaglieri Regiment

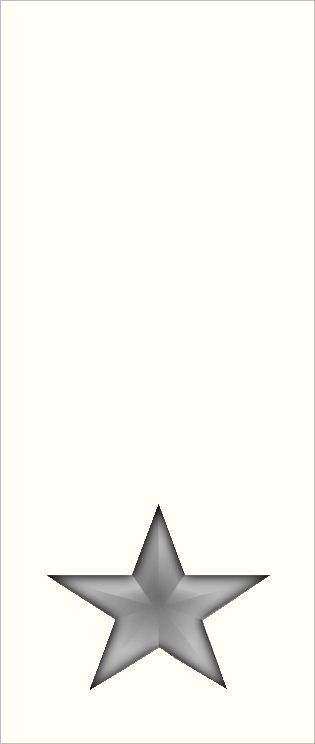
9th Infantry Regiment "Bari"

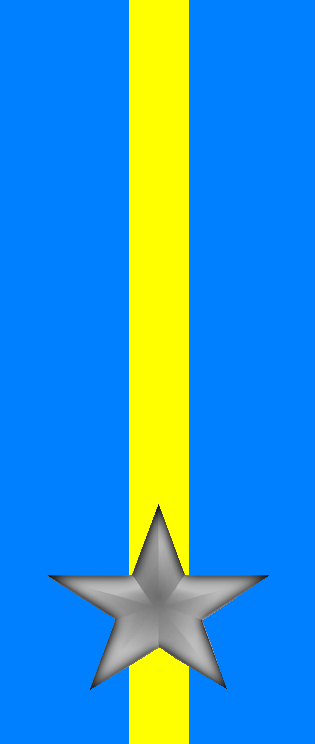
82nd Infantry Regiment "Torino"

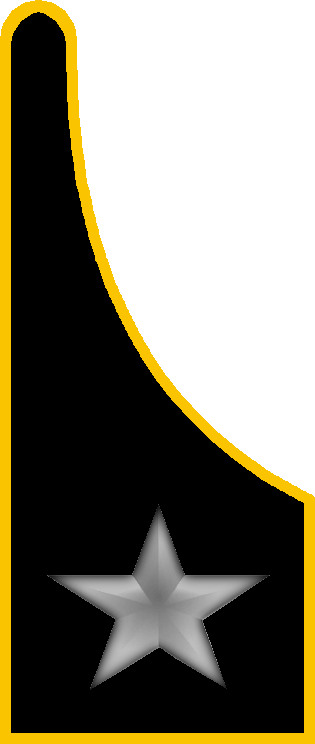
21st Artillery Regiment "Trieste"

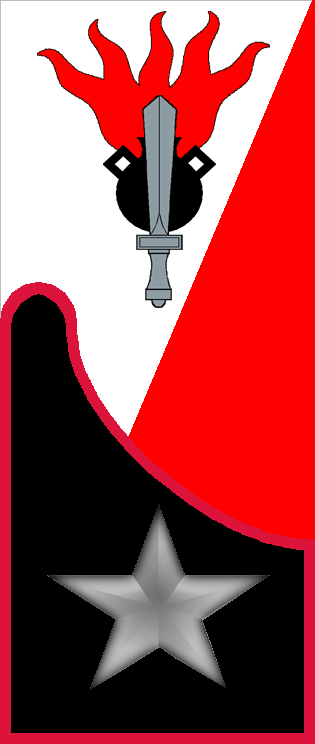
11th Engineer Regiment

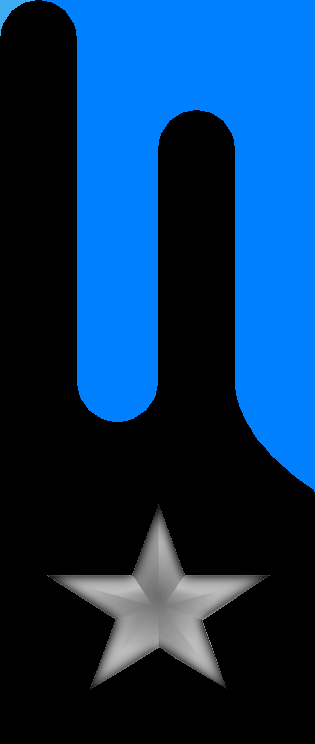
Logistic Regiment "Pinerolo"

== Sources ==
- Italian Army Website: Mechanized Brigade "Pinerolo"
- Regio Esercito: 24a Divisione di fanteria "Pinerolo"
- History of the "Pinerolo" Brigade in World War I
