= 50th Maneuver Logistic Battalion "Carnia" =

Inactive Italian Army corps logistics unit

- 50° Battaglione Logistico di Manovra "Carnia"
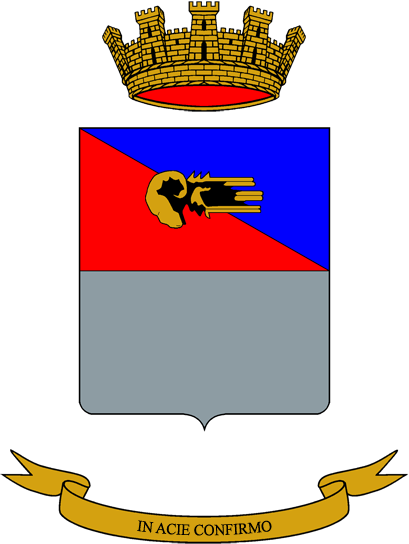
- Battalion coat of arms
- Active: 1 Sept. 1976 — 31 Oct. 1991
- Country: Italy
- Branch: Italian Army
- Role: Military logistics
- Part of: 5th Army Corps
- Garrison/HQ: Casarsa della Delizia
- Motto: "In acie confirmo"
- Anniversaries: 22 May 1916 - Battle of Asiago

Insignia
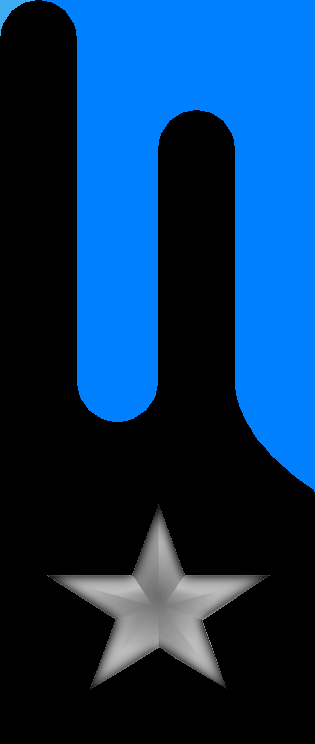
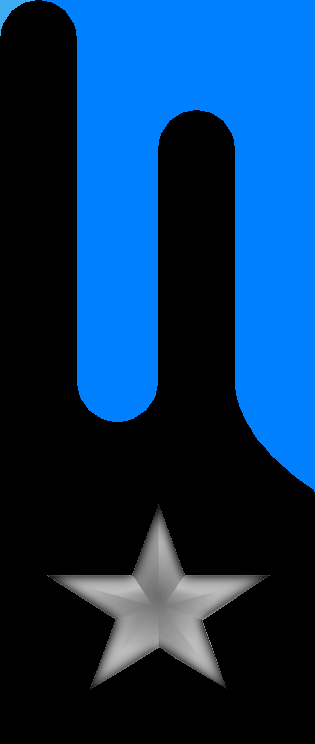
- Unit gorget patches

The 50th Maneuver Logistic Battalion "Carnia" (Italian: 50° Battaglione Logistico di Manovra "Carnia") is an inactive military logistics battalion of the Italian Army. The battalion was formed in 1975 as Logistic Battalion "Ariete" and assigned to the Armored Division "Ariete". After the division was disbanded in 1986 the battalion was reorganized as a corps logistic battalion, renamed 50th Maneuver Logistic Battalion "Carnia" and assigned to the 5th Army Corps. The battalion was disbanded in 1991. The battalion's anniversary falls, as for all units of the Italian Army's Transport and Materiel Corps, on 22 May, the anniversary of the Royal Italian Army's first major use of automobiles to transport reinforcements to the Asiago plateau to counter the Austro-Hungarian Asiago Offensive in May 1916.

== History ==
=== World War II ===
The battalion is the spiritual successor of the logistic units of the Royal Italian Army's II Armored Brigade, which was formed in July 1937 and expanded, on 1 February 1939, to 132nd Armored Division "Ariete". The division participated in the Western Desert campaign in North Africa, where it was destroyed in November 1942 during the Second Battle of El Alamein. The battalion is also the spiritual successor of the logistic units of the 135th Armored Cavalry Division "Ariete", which was active from April to September 1943.

=== Cold War ===
On 23 May 1948, the Armored Brigade "Ariete" was formed at Forte Pietralata in Rome. The brigade inherited the traditions of the two preceding divisions bearing the name "Ariete". The same year the Armored Brigade "Ariete" was transferred to Pordenone in the Friuli-Venezia Giulia region in Northern Italy, where the brigade was assigned to V Army Corps. On 1 October 1952, the brigade was expanded to Armored Division "Ariete".

On 31 August 1956, the logistic units of the division were assigned to the newly formed Service Units Command "Ariete" in Casarsa della Delizia. The command consisted of a medical section, a provisions section, a mobile vehicle park, a mobile workshop, and an auto unit. On 1 November 1961, the mobile vehicle park and mobile workshop merged to form the Resupply, Repairs, Recovery Unit "Ariete".

In 1963, the Italian Army reorganized its armored divisions along NATO standards and added a brigade level to the divisions' organization. On 1 January 1963, the Service Units Command "Ariete" in Casarsa della Delizia was reorganized as Services Grouping Command "Ariete". On 1 June 1963, the command of the I Services Battalion "Ariete" was activated in Pordenone and assigned to the I Mechanized Brigade "Ariete". On the same date the III Services Battalion "Ariete" was activated in Maniago and assigned to the III Armored Brigade "Ariete". On 1 April 1964, the command of the II Services Battalion "Ariete" was activated in Cordenons and assigned to the II Armored Brigade "Ariete".

The three service battalions of the division's brigades consisted of a command, a command platoon, an auto unit, a mobile workshop, a mixed services platoon, and provisions team, while the Services Grouping Command "Ariete" consisted of a command, a command platoon, the Auto Unit "Ariete", the Medical Company "Ariete", the Resupply, Repairs, Recovery Unit "Ariete", and the Provisions Company "Ariete", which was disbanded in 1964. On 1 January 1966, the three service battalions assigned to the division's brigades were reorganized and consisted afterwards of a command, a command company, an auto unit, a medical company, and a Resupply, Repairs, Recovery Unit. On 16 May of the same year, the Services Grouping Command "Ariete" expanded its Command Platoon to a Command Company.

On 30 September 1968, the division's three brigade headquarters were disbanded and the next day, on 1 October 1968, the three service battalions were assigned to the division's Services Grouping Command "Ariete". The command now consisted of a command, a command company, the Auto Unit "Ariete", the Resupply, Repairs, Recovery Unit "Ariete", the Medical Company "Ariete", and the three service battalions.

As part of the 1975 army reform the Armored Division "Ariete" was reorganized and three new brigades were formed with the division's units: on 1 October 1975, the 32nd Armored Brigade "Mameli" and on 1 November 1975, the 8th Mechanized Brigade "Garibaldi" and 132nd Armored Brigade "Manin". On 1 October 1975, the II Services Battalion "Ariete" was renamed Logistic Battalion "Mameli" and assigned to the 32nd Armored Brigade "Mameli". On 27 October 1975, the Medical Company "Ariete" was disbanded. On 1 November 1975, the I Services Battalion "Ariete" was renamed Logistic Battalion "Garibaldi" and assigned to the 8th Mechanized Brigade "Garibaldi", while the III Services Battalion "Ariete" was renamed Logistic Battalion "Manin" and assigned to the 132nd Armored Brigade "Manin".

On 1 September 1976, the division's services grouping command in Casarsa della Delizia was reorganized and renamed Logistic Battalion "Ariete", which received the traditions of all preceding logistic, transport, medical, maintenance, and supply units bearing the name "Ariete". The battalion consisted of a command, a command platoon, a supply and transport company, a medium workshop, and a vehicle park. At the time the battalion fielded 472 men (21 officers, 66 non-commissioned officers, and 385 soldiers).

On 12 November 1976, the President of the Italian Republic Giovanni Leone granted with decree 846 the battalion a flag.

On 1 December 1981, the battalion was reorganized and renamed Maneuver Logistic Battalion "Ariete". At the time the battalion consisted of the following units:

- Maneuver Logistic Battalion "Ariete", in Casarsa della Delizia
  - Command and Services Company
  - Supply Company
  - Maintenance Company
  - Medium Transport Company
  - 1st Mixed Transport Company
  - 2nd Mixed Transport Company (Reserve)

In 1986, the Italian Army abolished the divisional level and brigades, which until then had been under one of the Army's four divisions, came under direct command of the Army's 3rd Army Corps or 5th Army Corps. As the Armored Division "Ariete" carried the traditions of the 132nd Armored Division "Ariete", which had distinguished itself in the Western Desert campaign of World War II, the army decided to retain the name of the division. On 30 September 1986, the command of the Armored Division "Ariete" in Pordenone was disbanded and the next day the command of the Armored Brigade "Manin" moved from Aviano to Pordenone, where the command was renamed 132nd Armored Brigade "Ariete". The "Ariete" brigade retained the Manin's units, which, including the Logistic Battalion "Manin", changed their names from "Manin" to "Ariete".

On the same date, 1 October 1986, the Maneuver Logistic Battalion "Ariete" was assigned to the Support Units Command of the 5th Army Corps. As there existed now the "Ariete" brigade's Logistic Battalion "Ariete" and the disbanded division's Maneuver Logistic Battalion "Ariete", the army decided to rename the latter. On 1 November 1986, the Maneuver Logistic Battalion "Ariete" was renamed 50th Maneuver Logistic Battalion "Carnia". As per army naming convention for logistic units supporting corps-level commands the battalion was named for a geographic feature in the corps' area of operations; in case of the 50th Maneuver Logistic Battalion for the Carnia region.

=== Recent times ===
On 31 October 1991, the 50th Maneuver Logistic Battalion "Carnia" was disbanded and the battalion's flag was transferred to the Shrine of the Flags in the Vittoriano in Rome for safekeeping.

== See also ==
- Military logistics
