= 132nd Field Artillery Regiment "Ariete" =

Active Italian Army self-propelled artillery unit

- 132° Reggimento Artiglieria Terrestre "Ariete"
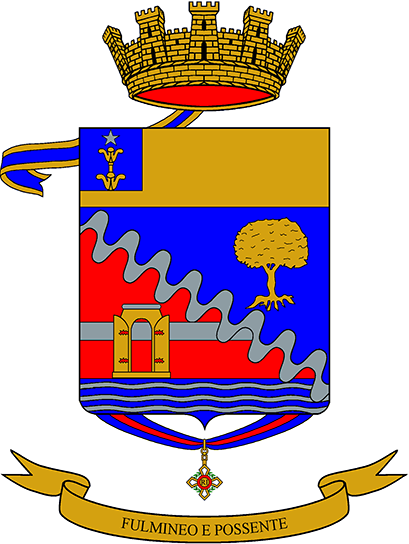
- Regimental coat of arms
- Active: 1 Feb. 1939 – 8 Dec. 1942; 15 May 1949 – 31 March 1993; 9 Oct. 1993 – today
- Country: Italy
- Branch: Italian Army
- Type: Artillery
- Role: Field artillery
- Part of: 132nd Armored Brigade "Ariete"
- Garrison/HQ: Maniago
- Motto: "Fulmineo e possente"
- Anniversaries: 15 June 1918 – Second Battle of the Piave River
- Decorations: 1× Military Order of Italy; 1× Gold Medal of Military Valor

Insignia
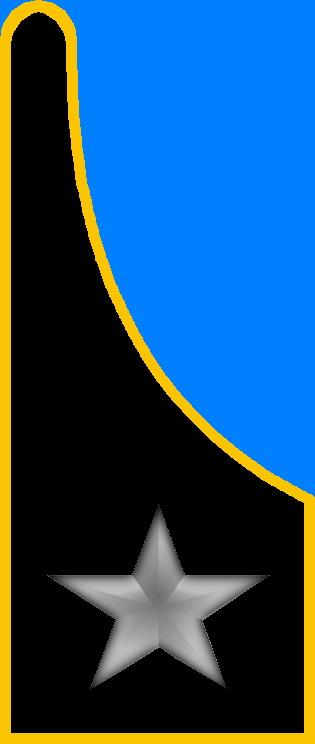
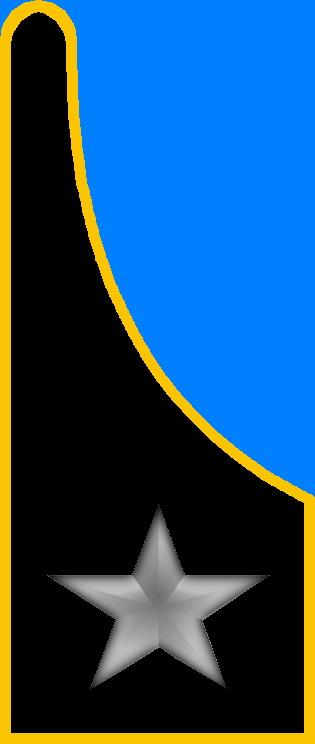
- Regimental gorget patches

The 132nd Field Artillery Regiment "Ariete" (Italian: 132° Reggimento Artiglieria Terrestre "Ariete") is a field artillery regiment of the Italian Army, specializing in armored combat. Originally an armored artillery regiment of the Royal Italian Army, the regiment was assigned during World War II to the 132nd Armored Division "Ariete", with which it fought in the Western Desert campaign until the division and regiment were destroyed in the Second Battle of El Alamein.

The regiment was reformed in 1949 and assigned to the Armored Division "Ariete". After the division was disbanded in 1986 the regiment was assigned to the 132nd Armored Brigade "Ariete". Disbanded for a short time at the end of the Cold War the regiment is today based in Maniago in Friuli-Venezia Giulia and assigned to the 132nd Armored Brigade "Ariete". The regimental anniversary falls, as for all Italian Army artillery regiments, on June 15, the beginning of the Second Battle of the Piave River in 1918.

== History ==
On 1 February 1939 the depot of the 4th Army Corps Artillery Regiment in Rovereto formed the command of the 132nd Armored Artillery Regiment. The regiment was assigned to the 132nd Armored Division "Ariete", which also included the 8th Bersaglieri Regiment and 32nd Tank Infantry Regiment. The new artillery regiment consisted of a command, a command unit, one anti-aircraft battery with 20/65 mod. 35 anti-aircraft guns, a depot, and two motorized groups with 75/27 mod. 11 field guns, one of which had been formed by the depot of the 4th Army Corps Artillery Regiment and the other by the depot of the 5th Army Corps Artillery Regiment.

=== World War II ===
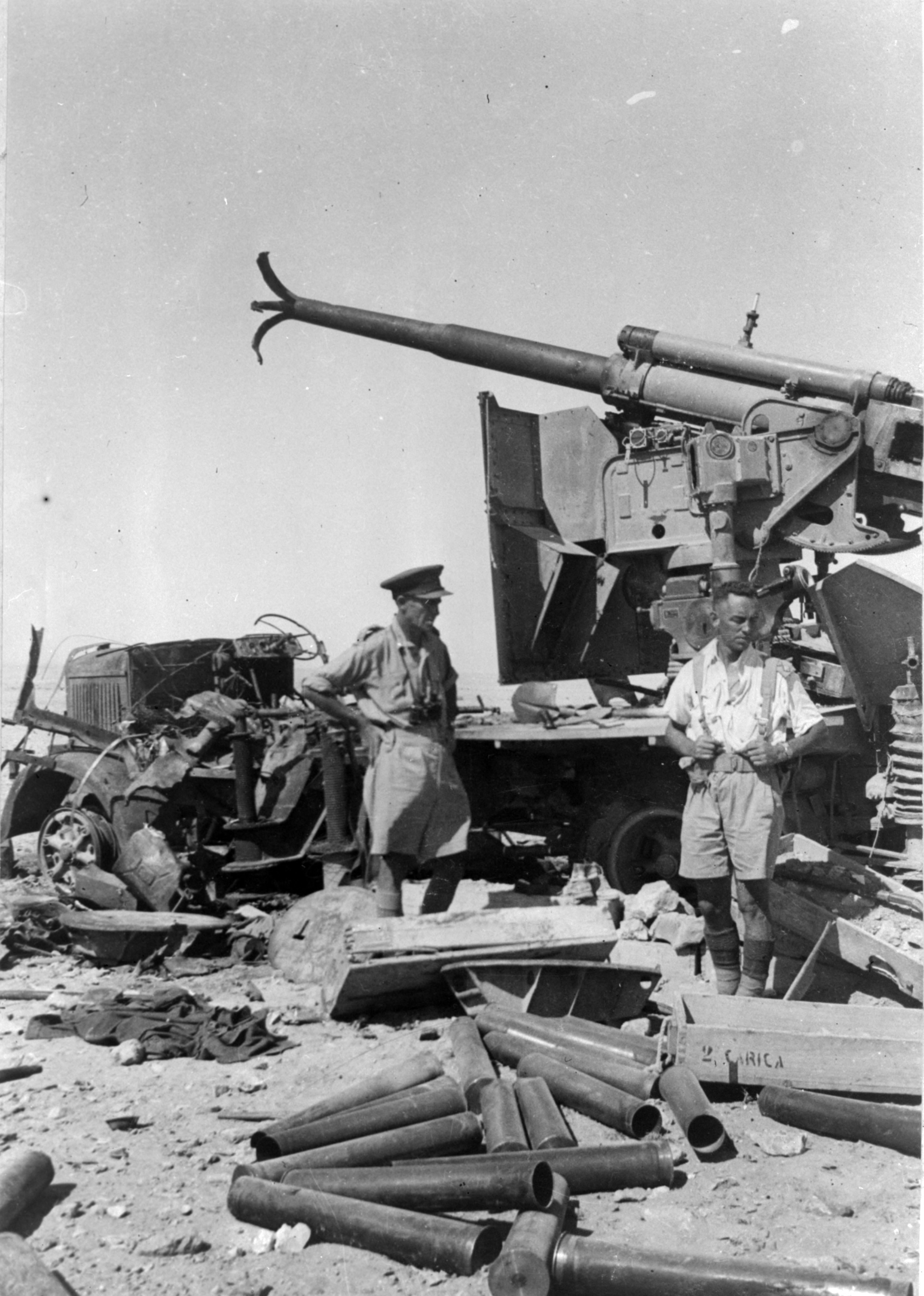
Destroyed 90/53 anti-aircraft gun of the 132nd Field Artillery Regiment "Ariete" after the First Battle of El Alamein

On 10 June 1940 Italy invaded France and the 132nd Armored Division "Ariete" was kept in reserve. After the rout of Italian forces in Libya during Operation Compass the Italians and Germans transferred reinforcements to Libya. The Ariete's first units disembarked Tripoli on 24 January 1941. From February 1941 to November 1942, the Ariete fought alongside the German Afrika Korps in the Western Desert campaign. In May 1942 the regiment consisted of a command, a command unit, the I and II groups with 75/27 mod. 06 field guns, the III Motorized Group with 105/28 cannons, the DII Mixed Group with two batteries with 90/53 anti-aircraft guns and two batteries with 20/65 mod. 35 anti-aircraft guns, and the XX Anti-aircraft Group with 8.8cm Flak anti-aircraft guns. The DII Mixed Group had been transferred from the 131st Artillery Regiment "Centauro".

On 4 November 1942 during the Second Battle of El Alamein the Ariete was surrounded by advancing enemy forces and destroyed. On 8 December 1942 the 132nd Armored Division "Ariete" and its regiments were declared lost due to wartime events.

For its conduct and sacrifice in North Africa the 132nd Artillery Regiment "Ariete" was awarded Italy highest military honor the Gold Medal of Military Valor, which was affixed to the regiment's flag and is depicted on the unit's coat of arms.

=== Cold War ===
The regiment was reformed on 15 May 1949 in Pordenone as 132nd Armored Artillery Regiment. The regiment was assigned to the Armored Brigade "Ariete" and consisted of a command, a command unit, the I Self-propelled Group with M7 Priest self-propelled guns, a battery with M10 tank destroyers. On 1 July 1949 the regiment received the IV Light Anti-aircraft Group with 40/56 autocannons from the 4th Light Anti-aircraft Artillery Regiment. On 1 August of the same year the regiment formed the II Self-propelled Group with M7 Priest self-propelled guns and on 1 December the regiment expanded its battery with M10 tank destroyers to III Anti-tank Group. In March 1952 the regiment formed the III Self-propelled Group with M7 Priest self-propelled guns and on 1 October of the same year the brigade was expanded to Armored Division "Ariete".

In July 1953 the III Anti-tank Group replaced its M10 tank destroyers with M36 tank destroyers and was renumbered as IV group, while the IV Light Anti-aircraft Group was renumbered as V Group. On 15 March 1954 the regiment formed the I and II light aircraft sections with L-21B artillery observation planes. On 1 October 1956 the IV Anti-tank Group replaced its M36 tank destroyers with M44 self-propelled howitzers. In 1958 the two light aircraft sections were merged to form the Light Aircraft Unit "Ariete".

On 1 January 1960 the regiment consisted of the following units:

- 132nd Armored Artillery Regiment, in Pordenone
  - Command Unit
  - I Self-propelled Group with M7 Priest self-propelled guns
  - II Self-propelled Group with M7 Priest self-propelled guns
  - III Self-propelled Group with M7 Priest self-propelled guns
  - IV Heavy Self-propelled Group with M44 self-propelled howitzer
  - V Light Anti-aircraft Group with 40/56 autocannons
  - Light Aircraft Unit "Ariete"

In 1963 the Italian Army reorganized its divisions along NATO standards and added a brigade level to the divisions' structure. On 1 February 1963 the Light Aircraft Unit "Ariete" was transferred to the 5th Army Corps and the V Light Anti-aircraft Group was renumbered VI in preparation for the forming of the V Heavy Self-propelled Artillery Group. On 2 July 1963 the I Self-propelled Group was assigned to the I Mechanized Brigade "Ariete" and the III Self-propelled Group was assigned to the III Armored Brigade "Ariete". On 1 November 1963 the regiment, which had moved from Pordenone to Casarsa della Delizia, consisted of a command, a command unit, the II Self-propelled Group with M7 Priest self-propelled guns, the IV Heavy Self-propelled Field Group with M44 self-propelled howitzers, and the VI Light Anti-aircraft Group with 40/56 autocannons.

On 16 February 1964 the V Heavy Self-propelled Artillery Group with M55 self-propelled howitzers was formed in Casarsa della Delizia. On 1 July of the same year the II Self-propelled Group was assigned to the II Armored Brigade "Ariete" and on 30 September the VI Light Anti-aircraft Group was placed in reserve status. As part of the reform the regiment was assigned to the newly formed divisional Artillery Brigade "Ariete", which also included an Artillery Specialists Battery that had been formed in 1964.

On 1 October 1968 the brigade level was abolished and the three self-propelled groups returned to the regiment, which afterwards was organized as follows:

- 132nd Armored Artillery Regiment, in Casarsa della Delizia
  - Command Unit
    - I Self-propelled Field Artillery Group with M7 Priest self-propelled guns, in Vacile Sequals Maniago
    - II Self-propelled Field Artillery Group with M7 Priest self-propelled guns, in Sequals
    - III Self-propelled Field Artillery Group with M7 Priest self-propelled guns, in Maniago
    - IV Heavy Self-propelled Field Artillery Group with M44 self-propelled howitzers
    - V Heavy Self-propelled Artillery Group with M55 self-propelled howitzers
    - VI Light Anti-aircraft Artillery Group (Reserve) with 40/56 autocannons
    - Artillery Specialists Battery, in Casarsa della Delizia

In 1972 the regiment received M109G self-propelled howitzers and by 1 January 1973 the I, II, III, and IV groups had replaced their M7 Priest with the modern M109G. On 1 August 1975 also the V Group replaced its M55 with M109G self-propelled howitzers.

During the 1975 army reform the army disbanded the regimental level and newly independent battalions and groups were granted for the first time their own flags: on 1 October the regiment's I Self-propelled Field Artillery Group was renamed 12th Self-propelled Field Artillery Group "Capua" and assigned to the 32nd Armored Brigade "Mameli". On 1 November the III Self-propelled Field Artillery Group was renamed 20th Self-propelled Field Artillery Group "Piave" and assigned to the 132nd Armored Brigade "Manin". On 1 December the II Self-propelled Field Artillery Group was renamed 19th Self-propelled Field Artillery Group "Rialto" and assigned to the 8th Mechanized Brigade "Garibaldi". On 31 December 1975 the 132nd Armored Artillery Regiment was disbanded and the next day the regiment's IV Heavy Self-propelled Field Artillery Group was renamed 132nd Heavy Self-propelled Field Artillery Group "Rovereto", while the V Heavy Self-propelled Artillery Group was renamed 108th Heavy Self-propelled Field Artillery Group "Cosseria", and the regiment's Command and Services Battery and the regiment's Specialists Battery formed the Artillery Specialists Group "Ariete". The VI Light Anti-aircraft Artillery Group was renamed 14th Light Anti-aircraft Artillery Group "Astore" and remained a reserve formation. On the same day the 132nd and 108th groups, as well as the artillery specialists group and light anti-aircraft artillery group, were assigned to the Armored Division "Ariete" Artillery Command, which had been formed with the personnel of the disbanded regiment's command. To avoid confusion with the support units of the Armored Division "Ariete" the group was named for the city of Rovereto, where the 132nd Armored Artillery Regiment had been formed. The group consisted, like the 108th Heavy Self-propelled Field Artillery Group "Cosseria", of a command, a command and services battery, and three batteries with M109G self-propelled howitzers.

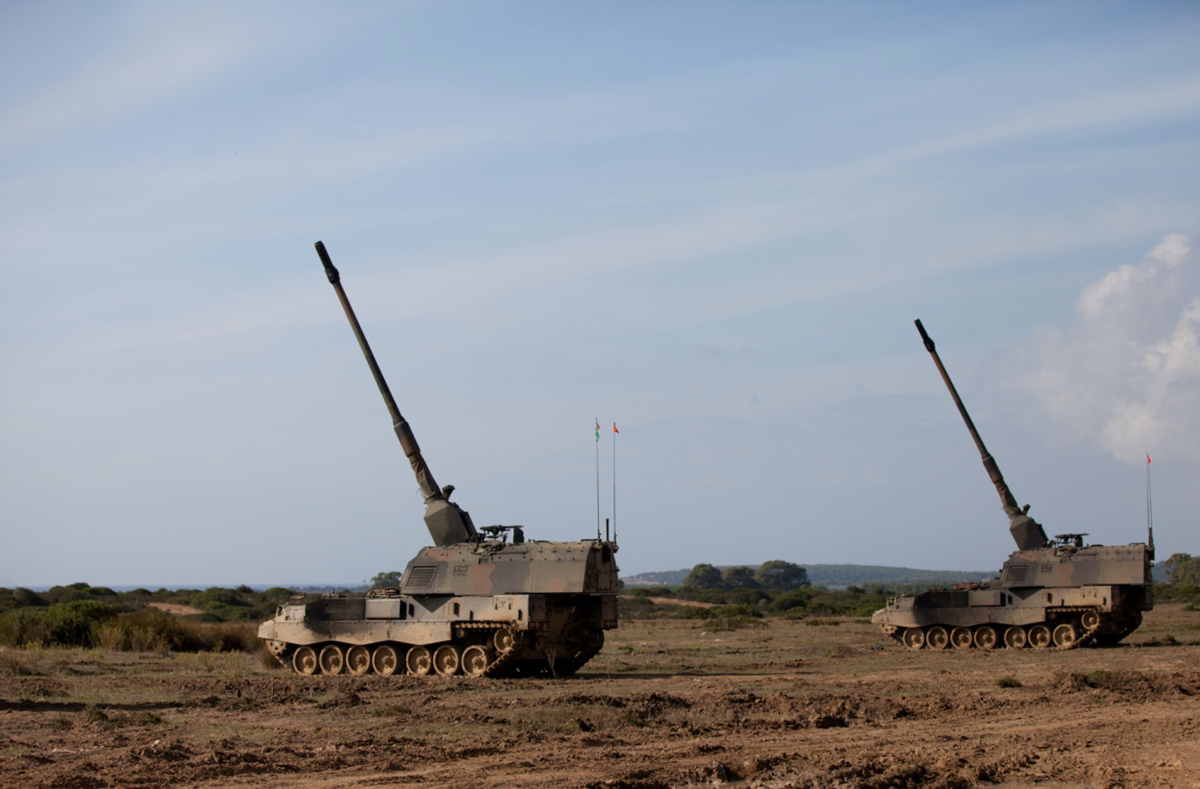
132nd Field Artillery Regiment "Ariete" PzH 2000 self-propelled howitzers during an exercise in 2020

On 12 November 1976 the President of the Italian Republic Giovanni Leone assigned with decree 846 the flag and traditions of the 132nd Artillery Regiment "Ariete" to the 132nd Heavy Field Artillery Group "Rovereto". At the time the group fielded 477 men (38 officers, 62 non-commissioned officers, and 377 soldiers).

In March 1981 the group was equipped with modern FH70 155mm howitzers and renamed 132nd Heavy Field Artillery Group "Rovereto". In 1986 the Italian Army abolished the divisional level and so on 31 October 1986 the Armored Division "Ariete" was disbanded. The next day the group was assigned to the Artillery Command of the 5th Army Corps.

=== Recent times ===
On 1 December 1991 the 132nd Heavy Field Artillery Group "Rovereto" was assigned to the 5th Heavy Field Artillery Regiment. On 31 March 1993 the 5th Heavy Field Artillery Regiment and 132nd Heavy Field Artillery Group "Rovereto" were disbanded and the flag of the 132nd Artillery Regiment "Ariete" was returned to the Shrine of the Flags in the Vittoriano in Rome. On 8 October 1993 the flag of the 19th Self-propelled Field Artillery Group "Rialto" of the 132nd Armored Brigade "Ariete" departed the group's base in Maniago and began its journey to the Shrine of the Flags in the Vittoriano in Rome. The next day personnel and materiel of the disbanded group were used to reform the 132nd Self-propelled Field Artillery Regiment "Ariete". In 2000 the regiment was renamed 132nd Field Artillery Regiment "Ariete". In 2008 the regiment replaced its M109L self-propelled howitzers with modern PzH 2000 self-propelled howitzers.

== Organization ==
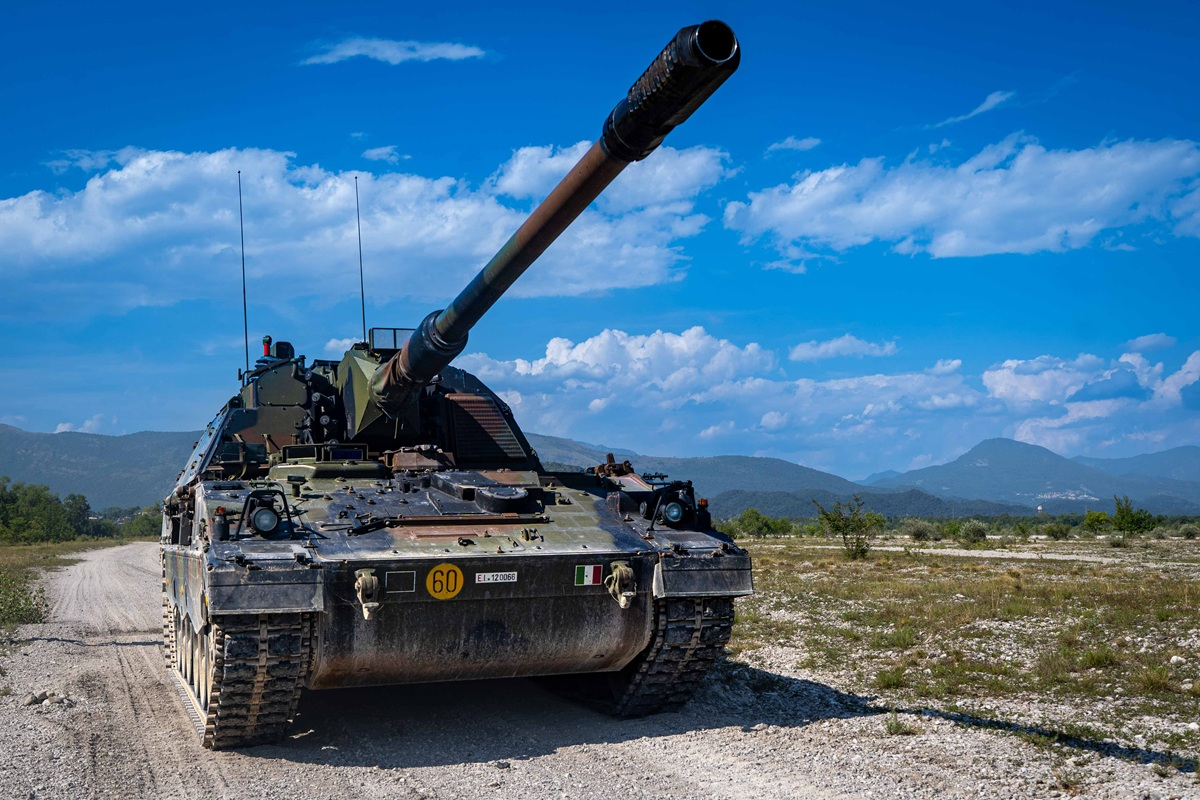
132nd Field Artillery Regiment "Ariete" PzH 2000 self-propelled howitzer during exercise Ermes 1/26

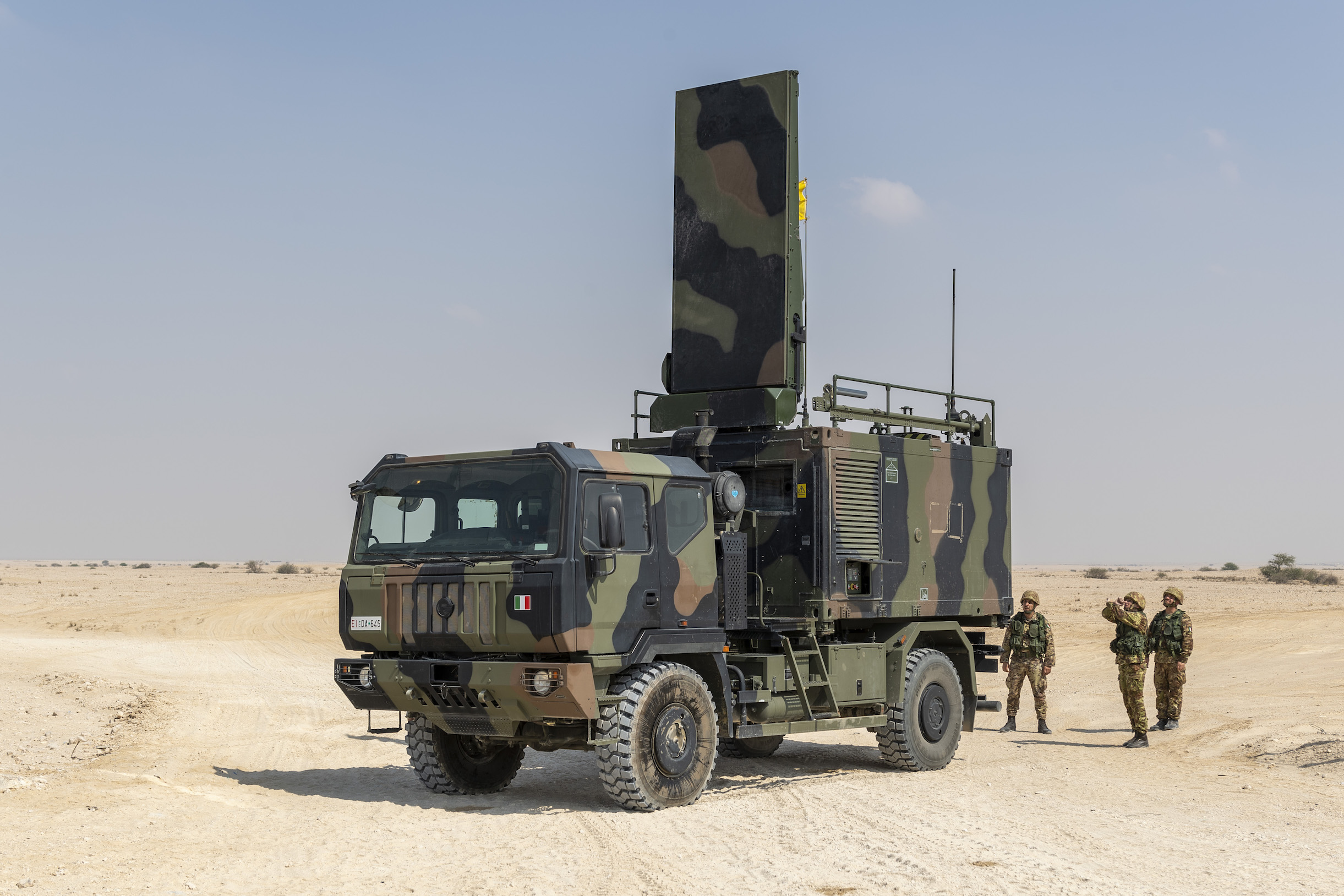
132nd Field Artillery Regiment "Ariete" ARTHUR radar during an exercise in 2020

As of 2026 the 132nd Field Artillery Regiment "Ariete" is organized as follows:

- 132nd Field Artillery Regiment "Ariete", in Maniago
  - Command and Logistic Support Battery "Tobruk"
  - Surveillance, Target Acquisition and Tactical Liaison Battery "Ain el Gazala"
  - 1st Self-propelled Group "El Alamein"
    - 1st Howitzer Battery "Rughet el Atasc"
    - 2nd Howitzer Battery "Bir Hacheim"
    - 3rd Howitzer Battery "El Mechili"
    - Fire and Technical Support Battery

The regiment is equipped with PzH 2000 self-propelled howitzers. The Surveillance, Target Acquisition and Tactical Liaison Battery is equipped with RQ-11B Raven unmanned aerial vehicles and ARTHUR counter-battery radars.

== See also ==
- 132nd Armored Brigade "Ariete"
