= 11th Engineer Regiment (Italy) =

Active Italian Army combat engineer unit

- 11° Reggimento Genio Guastatori
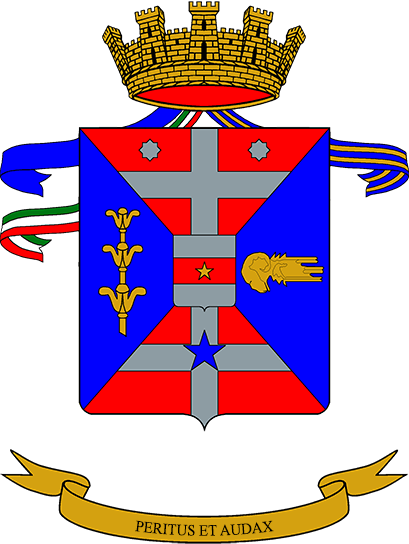
- Regimental coat of arms
- Active: 1 March 1928 — 8 Sept. 1943; 1 Nov. 1975 — today
- Country: Italy
- Branch: Italian Army
- Role: Combat engineers
- Part of: Mechanized Brigade "Pinerolo"
- Garrison/HQ: Foggia
- Motto: "Peritus et audax"
- Anniversaries: 24 June 1918 - Second Battle of the Piave River
- Decorations: 1× Bronze Medal of Military Valor; 1× Silver Medal of Army Valor; 1× Bronze Medal of Civil Valor

Insignia
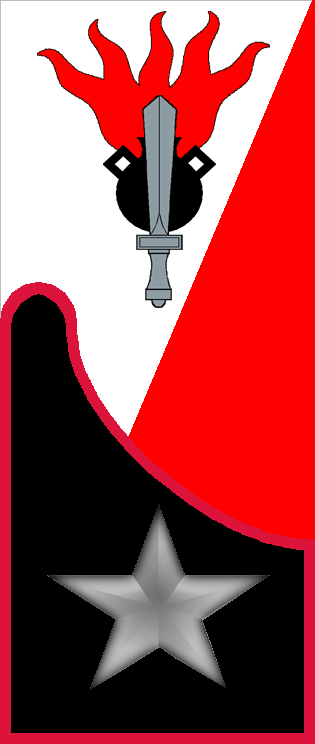
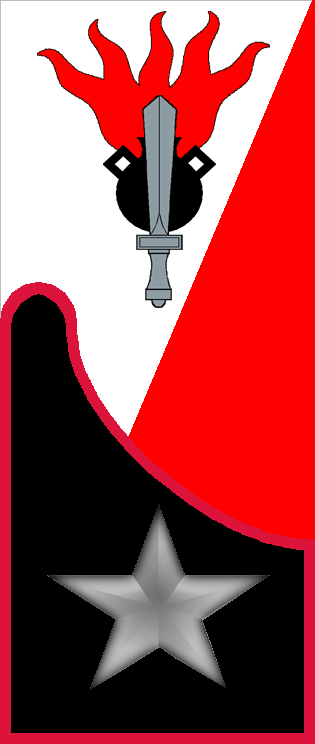
- Sappers gorget patches

The 11th Engineer Regiment (Italian: 11° Reggimento Genio Guastatori) is a military engineering regiment of the Italian Army based in Foggia in Apulia. The regiment is the engineer unit of the Mechanized Brigade "Pinerolo" and was first formed in 1928 by the Royal Italian Army. During World War II the regiment's depot formed engineer battalions and smaller units, which deployed with divisions and corps to the fronts of the war. After the announcement of the Armistice of Cassibile on 8 September 1943 the regiment was disbanded by invading German forces. In 1958, the Engineer Battalion "Ariete" was formed and assigned to the Armored Division "Ariete".

In 1975, the battalion was named for the Livenza river and received the number 132nd, which had been used by the 132nd Engineer Company that served with the 132nd Armored Division "Ariete" during the Western Desert campaign in World War II. With the name and number the battalion was also assigned the flag and traditions of the 11th Engineer Regiment. In 1986, the Armored Division "Ariete" was disbanded and the battalion was assigned to the 5th Army Corps. In 1993, the battalion lost its autonomy and entered the reformed 11th Pioneers Regiment. In 2001, the regiment moved to Foggia in the South of Italy, where it was assigned to the Mechanized Brigade "Pinerolo".

== History ==
=== Interwar years ===
On 1 March 1928, Royal Italian Army formed the 11th Engineer Regiment in Treviso with companies and personnel ceded by other engineer regiments: the 2nd Engineer Regiment ceded a sappers-miners company, the 4th Engineer Regiment ceded a telegraphers company and a dovecote located in Treviso, the 5th Engineer Regiment ceded its cableway battalion, a sappers-miners company, a telegraphers company and two dovecotes located in Udine and in Gorizia, the 6th Engineer Regiment ceded a sappers-miners company and a telegraphers company, the 7th Engineer Regiment and 10th Engineer Regiment ceded the personnel needed to form the new regiment's depot. After its formation the new regiment was assigned to the XI Army Corps and consisted of a sappers-miners battalion, a telegraphers battalion, a cableway battalion, and three dovecotes. The regiment's 2nd Company had already been active during the First Italian War of Independence, during which the company distinguished itself on 23 March 1849 in the Battle of Novara and was awarded a Bronze Medal of Military Valor. Upon entering the newly formed regiment, the company's Bronze Medal of Military Valor was affixed to the regiment's flag.

On 1 February 1931, the Cableway Battalion was reorganized as Miners-Cableway Battalion. In 1932 the regiment moved from Treviso to Udine. On 28 October 1932, the regiment transferred the Miners-Cableway Battalion to the newly formed 2nd Miners Regiment in Verona. On the same day the regiment received the V Telegraphers Battalion of the disbanded 2nd Radio-Telegraphers Regiment.

In 1935-36, during the Second Italo-Ethiopian War, the regiment mobilized two photo-electrician sections and one radio-telegraphers section. It also provided 35 Officers and 1,245 enlisted to fill out units deployed to East Africa for the war. In 1935, the regiment formed a Mixed Engineer Company for alpine division. At the end of 1936, the regiment consisted of a command, an engineer battalion, a radio-telegraphers battalion, mixed engineer company for alpine division, an engineer company for cavalry division, a depot, and three dovecotes. In January 1937, the telegraphers and radio-telegraphers battalions were renamed connections battalions.

=== World War II ===
During World War II the regiment's depot in Udine mobilized the following units:

- III Mixed Engineer Battalion (for the 3rd Alpine Division "Julia")
- VII Engineer Battalion
- XII Engineer Battalion
- XVII Mixed Engineer Battalion (for the Armored Army Corps)
- 14th and 15th mobile dovecotes
- and many smaller units

The III Mixed Engineer Battalion fought in the Greco-Italian War and in the Italian campaign on the Eastern Front. For its conduct in the Greco-Italian War the battalion was awarded a Bronze Medal of Military Valor and for its conduct on the Eastern Front the battalion was awarded a Silver Medal of Military Valor. As of 2024, both medals are temporarily assigned to the 2nd Alpine Signal Regiment and affixed to that regiment's flag. In the evening of 8 September 1943, the Armistice of Cassibile, which ended hostilities between the Kingdom of Italy and the Anglo-American Allies, was announced by General Dwight D. Eisenhower on Radio Algiers and by Marshal Pietro Badoglio on Italian radio. Germany reacted by invading Italy and the 11th Engineer Regiment was disbanded soon thereafter by German forces.

==== 132nd Engineer Company ====
In February 1939, the depot of the 4th Engineer Regiment in Bolzano formed the 132nd Mixed Engineer Company for the 132nd Armored Division "Ariete". In January 1941, the "Ariete" division was sent to Libya, where it fought in the Western Desert campaign. On 11 August 1941, the 132nd Mixed Engineer Company was split to form the 132nd Engineer Company and the 232nd Connections Company, which both were assigned on the same day to the newly formed XXXII Mixed Engineer Battalion. In November 1942, the "Ariete" division and with it the XXXII Mixed Engineer Battalion were destroyed during the Second Battle of El Alamein. On 8 December 1942, the division and its units were declared lost due to wartime events.

=== Cold War ===
On 23 May 1948, the Italian Army formed the Armored Brigade "Ariete" in Rome. The brigade moved the same year from Rome to Pordenone in Friuli-Venezia Giulia. On 25 July 1952, an Engineer Company was formed for the Armored Brigade "Ariete", which, on 1 October 1952, was reorganized and expanded to Armored Division "Ariete". On 1 July 1958, the company entered the newly formed Engineer Battalion "Ariete" in Motta di Livenza. The newly formed battalion consisted of a command, a command and park company, and two engineer companies.

In 1963, the Italian Army reorganized its armored divisions along NATO standards and added a brigade level to the divisions' organization. As part of the reorganization the Engineer Battalion "Ariete" formed a mechanized engineer company for each of the "Ariete" division's three brigades. For its work after the 1966 Venice flood the battalion was awarded a Bronze Medal of Civil Valor. On 30 September 1968, the three brigade headquarters were disbanded and the next day, on 1 October 1968, the brigades' mechanized engineer companies returned to the Engineer Battalion "Ariete", which renumbered them as 3rd Engineer Company, 4th Engineer Company, and 5th Engineer Company.

During the 1975 army reform the army disbanded the regimental level and newly independent battalions were granted for the first time their own flags. During the reform engineer battalions were named for a lake, if they supported an corps-level command, or a river, if they supported a division or brigade. As part of the reform the Armored Division "Ariete" was reorganized and three new brigades were formed with the division's units: on 1 October 1975, the 32nd Armored Brigade "Mameli" and on 1 November 1975, the 8th Mechanized Brigade "Garibaldi" and 132nd Armored Brigade "Manin". On the same day, 1 November 1975, the Engineer Battalion "Ariete" was renamed 132nd Engineer Battalion "Livenza". The battalion was named for the Livenza river, which flows past the battalion's base in Motta di Livenza. Also on the same day, the "Livenza" battalion transferred the three engineer companies, which had been formed during the 1963 reform, to the three new brigades. After the reform the 132nd Engineer Battalion "Livenza" consisted of a command, a command and park company, and two engineer companies. At the time the battalion fielded 527 men (30 officers, 68 non-commissioned officers, and 429 soldiers).

On 12 November 1976, the President of the Italian Republic Giovanni Leone assigned with decree 846 the flag and traditions of the 11th Engineer Regiment to the battalion. The battalion also received the traditions of all engineer units, which had served with the "Ariete" divisions. For its conduct and work after the 1976 Friuli earthquake the battalion was awarded a Silver Medal of Army Valor, which was affixed to the battalion's flag and added to the battalion's coat of arms.

In 1986, the Armored Division "Ariete" was disbanded. Consequently, on 1 August 1986, the battalion was renamed 132nd Sappers Battalion "Livenza" and, on 1 October 1986, the battalion was transferred to the 5th Army Corps' Engineer Command. During the same year the battalion formed a third engineer company. On 31 August 1987, the battalion's Command and Park Company split into a Command and Services Company and a Special Equipment Company. Afterwards the battalion consisted of the following units:

- 132nd Sappers Battalion "Livenza", in Motta di Livenza
  - Command and Services Company
  - 1st Sappers Company
  - 2nd Sappers Company
  - 3rd Sappers Company
  - Special Equipment Company

=== Recent times ===
On 1 April 1991, the battalion was renamed 132nd Engineer Battalion "Livenza". On 23 June 1993, the battalion lost its autonomy and the next day the battalion entered the reformed 11th Pioneers Regiment. On the same day, the flag and traditions of the 11th Engineer Regiment were transferred from the battalion to the 11th Pioneers Regiment. In 2001, the regiment was renamed 11th Engineer Regiment and moved from Motta di Livenza to Foggia in the South of Italy, where it was assigned to the Mechanized Brigade "Pinerolo".

== Organization ==
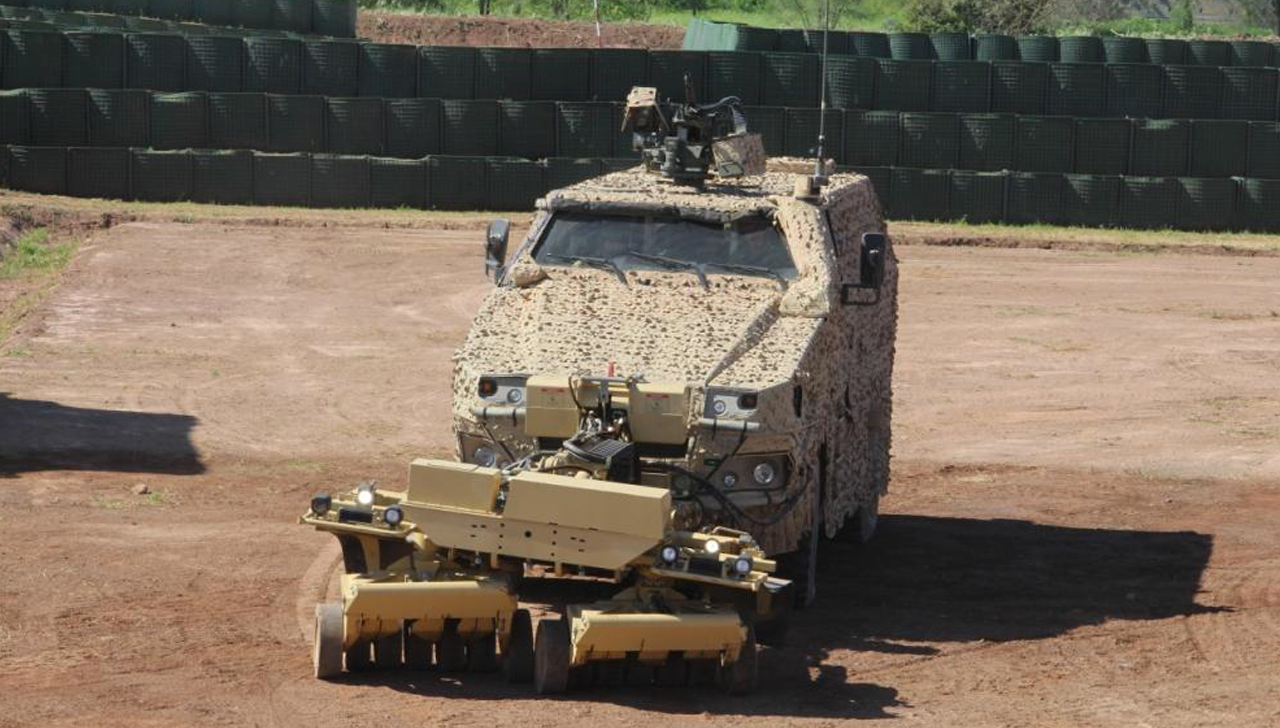
A VTMM "Orso" Route Clearing vehicle of the Italian engineer corps

As of 2024 the 11th Engineer Regiment is organized as follows:

- 11th Engineer Regiment, in Foggia
  - Command and Logistic Support Company
  - 132nd Sappers Battalion "Livenza"
    - 1st Sappers Company
    - 2nd Sappers Company
    - 3rd Sappers Company
    - 4th Deployment Support Company

== See also ==
- Mechanized Brigade "Pinerolo"
