= Leonardo Maniago =

Italian priest and historian

Leonardo di Maniago (1525 - 1601) was an Italian priest and historian.

He was born in Cividale del Friuli. He is known for his chronicle that includes events around the Council of Trent in 1543-1563 up until the year 1597. The book as published by Comino Ventura from Bergamo in 1597 and also published in Venice. He died in Maniago.
