= 132nd Armored Brigade "Ariete" =

- 132^{a} Brigata Corazzata "Ariete"
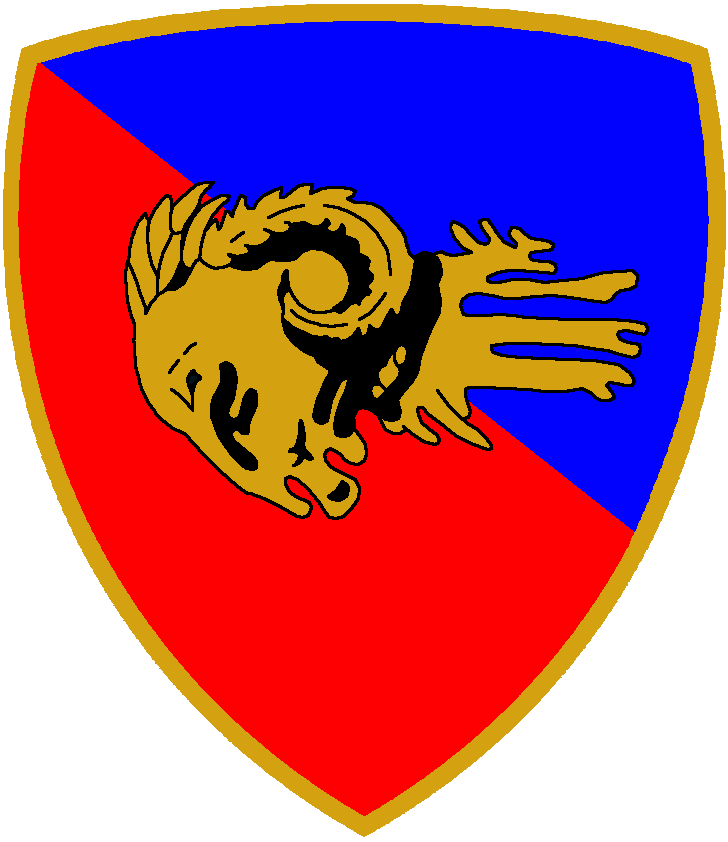
- Coat of Arms of the 132nd Armored Brigade "Ariete"
- Active: Division: 1 October 1952 – 30 September 1986; Brigade: 23 May 1948 - 30 September 1952; 1 October 1986 – present
- Country: Italy
- Branch: Italian Army
- Role: Armored warfare
- Size: Brigade
- Part of: Multinational Division South
- Garrison/HQ: Pordenone
- Mottos: "Ferrea mole, Ferreo cuore" (Iron mass, Iron heart)
- Colors: Blue and red
- Mascot: Ram Head
- Engagements: Somalia UNITAF; Bosnia SFOR; Kosovo KFOR; Afghanistan ISAF; Iraq Multinational force in Iraq; Lebanon UNIFIL

The 132nd Armored Brigade "Ariete" (Italian: 132a Brigata Corazzata "Ariete") is currently the only active armored brigade of the Italian Army. Its core units are tank and Bersaglieri regiments. The brigade's headquarters is in Pordenone, and most of its units are based in the northeast of Italy. The brigade's name comes from the battering ram (Italian: Ariete). The brigade draws much of its historical traditions from the 132nd Armored Division "Ariete," which fought in the Western Desert Campaign of World War II. In 1948, the Ariete was reconstituted as a division and remained active until 1986. Today the brigade is part of the Multinational Division South.

== History ==
=== World War II ===
The 132nd Armored Division "Ariete" was formed in February 1939. In December 1940, the division was sent to Libya to fight in the Western Desert Campaign. The division was destroyed in the Second Battle of El Alamein and declared lost due to wartime events on 8 December 1942.

=== Reconstitution ===
On 23 May 1948, the Italian Army raised the Armored Brigade "Ariete" at Forte Pietralata in Rome. The same year, it was transferred to Pordenone in the Friuli region in Northern Italy and assigned to V Army Corps. The brigade consisted of the following units.

- Armored Brigade "Ariete", in Pordenone
  - 8th Bersaglieri Regiment, in Pordenone (formed on 15 September 1949)
    - III Bersaglieri Battalion (M3 Half-tracks)
    - V Bersaglieri Battalion (M3 Half-tracks)
  - 132nd Tank Regiment, in Aviano
    - I Tank Battalion (M26 Pershing tanks)
    - II Tank Battalion (M26 Pershing tanks)
  - 132nd Armored Artillery Regiment, in Pordenone
    - I Self-propelled Howitzer Group (M7 Priest self-propelled howitzers)
    - II Self-propelled Howitzer Group (M7 Priest self-propelled howitzers)
    - III Self-propelled Howitzer Group (M7 Priest self-propelled howitzers)
    - IV Light Air-defense Group (M1 40 mm anti-aircraft guns)
  - Engineer Platoon
  - Signal Platoon
  - Brigade Services

=== Armored Division "Ariete" ===
On 1 October 1952 the brigade was expanded to full division and consisted of the following units:

- Armored Division "Ariete"
  - 8th Bersaglieri Regiment
    - III Bersaglieri Battalion (M3 Half-tracks)
    - V Bersaglieri Battalion (M3 Half-tracks)
    - XII Bersaglieri Battalion (M3 Half-tracks)
    - Bersaglieri Anti-tank Company (M40 recoilless rifles)
  - 132nd Tank Regiment
    - I Tank Battalion (M26 Pershing tanks, later replaced by M47 Patton main battle tanks)
    - II Tank Battalion (M26 Pershing tanks, later replaced by M47 Patton main battle tanks)
    - III Tank Battalion (M26 Pershing tanks, later replaced by M47 Patton main battle tanks)
  - 132nd Armored Artillery Regiment
    - I Self-propelled Howitzer Group (M7 Priest self-propelled howitzers)
    - II Self-propelled Howitzer Group (M7 Priest self-propelled howitzers)
    - III Self-propelled Howitzer Group (M7 Priest self-propelled howitzers)
    - IV Self-propelled Howitzer Group (M7 Priest self-propelled howitzers)
    - V Light Air-defense Group (M1 40 mm anti-aircraft guns)
    - VI Light Air-defense Group (M1 40mm anti-aircraft guns)
  - Armored Cavalry Squadron "Cavalleggeri Guide" (M8 Greyhound)
  - 132nd Engineer Company (expanded to Engineer Battalion "Ariete" on 1 July 1958)
  - 132nd Signal Company (expanded to Signal Battalion "Ariete" on 1 October 1958)
  - Divisional Services

=== 1963 reorganization ===
In 1963, Italian divisions adapted their organization to NATO standards and thus added a brigade level to the division's structure. In the same year, the reconstitution of the 32nd Tank Regiment began. The Ariete was now organized as follows:

- Armored Division "Ariete", in Pordenone
  - I Mechanized Brigade "Ariete", in Pordenone (formed 1 January 1963)
    - 8th Bersaglieri Regiment, in Pordenone
      - III Bersaglieri Battalion (M113 armored personnel carriers)
      - XII Bersaglieri Battalion (M113 armored personnel carriers)
      - VII Tank Battalion (M47 Patton main battle tanks)
      - Bersaglieri Anti-tank Company (M40 recoilless rifles)
    - I/132nd Armored Artillery Regiment (M7 Priest self-propelled howitzers)
    - I Service Battalion
    - 1st Engineer Company
    - 1st Signal Company
  - II Armored Brigade "Ariete", in Pordenone (formed 1 October 1963)
    - 32nd Tank Regiment, in Cordenons (operational from 1 March 1964)
      - III Tank Battalion (M47 Patton main battle tanks)
      - V Tank Battalion (M47 Patton main battle tanks)
      - XXIII Bersaglieri Battalion (M113 armored personnel carriers)
    - II/132nd Armored Artillery Regiment (M7 Priest self-propelled howitzers)
    - II Service Battalion
    - 2nd Engineer Company
    - 2nd Signal Company
  - III Armored Brigade "Ariete", in Maniago (formed 1 January 1963)
    - 132nd Tank Regiment, in Aviano
      - VIII Tank Battalion (M47 Patton main battle tanks)
      - X Tank Battalion (M47 Patton main battle tanks)
      - XXXVIII Bersaglieri Battalion (M113 armored personnel carriers)
    - III/132nd Armored Artillery Regiment (M7 Priest self-propelled howitzers)
    - III Service Battalion
    - 3rd Engineer Company
    - 3rd Signal Company
  - Artillery Brigade "Ariete" (1 October 1963 in Casarsa della Delizia)
    - 132nd Armored Artillery Regiment, in Pordenone
      - IV Heavy Self-propelled Field Artillery Group (M44 self-propelled howitzers)
      - V Heavy Self-propelled Artillery Group (M55 self-propelled howitzers)
      - VI Light Air-defense Group (L60 40 mm anti-aircraft guns)
  - XIX Reconnaissance Squadrons Group "Cavalleggeri Guide" (M24 Chaffee (M24 Chaffee light tanks and M113 armored personnel carriers)
  - Engineer Battalion "Ariete"
  - Signal Battalion "Ariete"
  - Light Airplane Section "Ariete" (L-21B airplanes)
  - Helicopter Section "Ariete" (AB 47J helicopters)

On 1 October 1968, the brigade headquarters were disbanded, and the divisions returned to their former structure. The "Ariete" was part of the 5th Army Corps based in North-Eastern Italy. The 5th Army Corps was tasked (with defending the Yugoslav-Italian border against possible attacks by either the Warsaw Pact, Yugoslavia, or both. The Ariete was the corps' armored reserve.

=== 1975 army reform ===
Before the Italian Army reform of 1975 the division had the following organization:

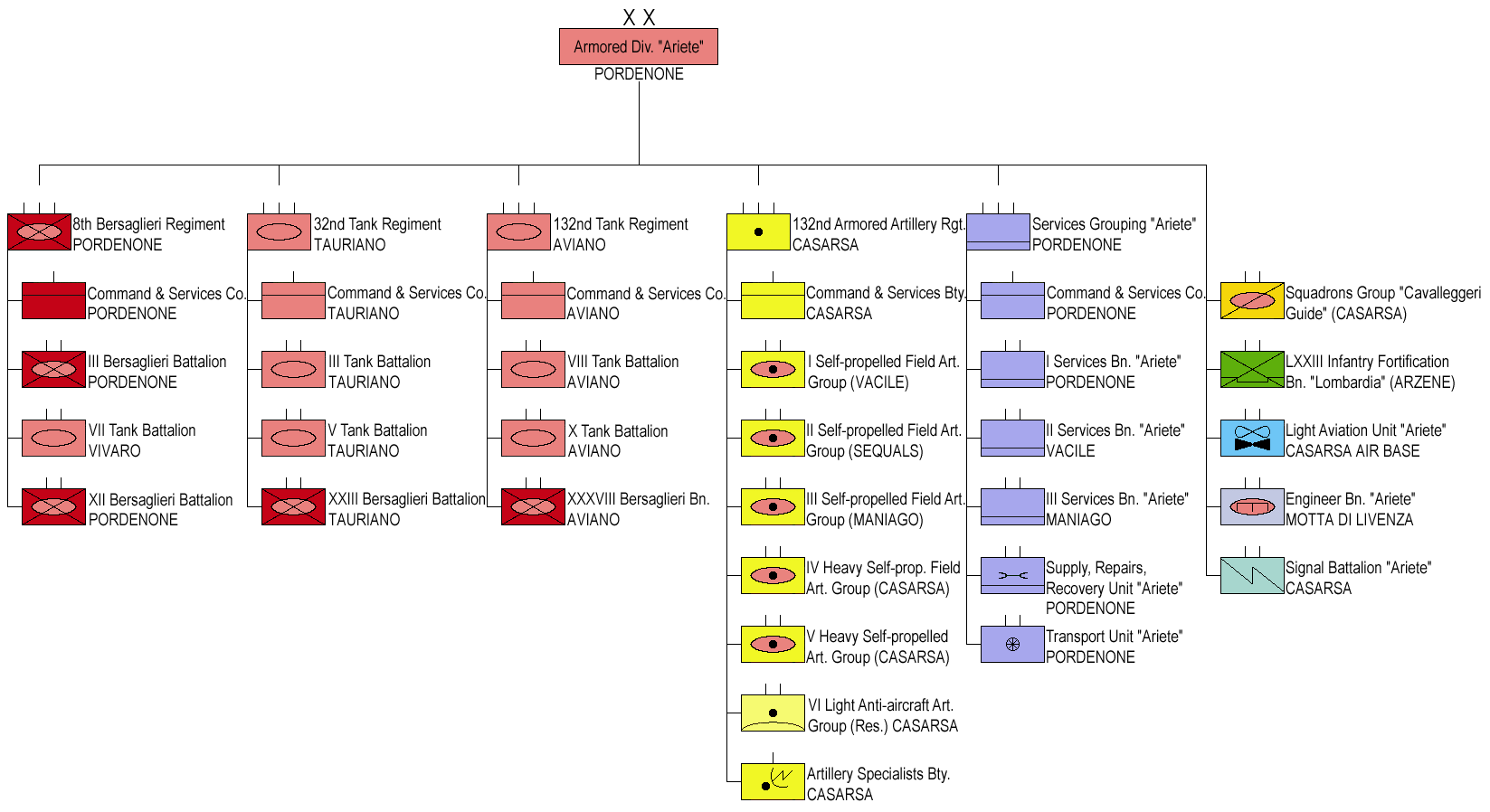
Armored Division "Ariete" in 1974

- 132nd Armored Division Ariete|Armored Division "Ariete", in Pordenone
  - 8th Bersaglieri Regiment, in Pordenone
    - Command and Services Company, in Pordenone (includes an anti-tank guided missile platoon)
    - III Bersaglieri Battalion, in Pordenone (M113 armored personnel carriers)
    - VII Tank Battalion, in Vivaro (M60A1 Patton main battle tanks)
    - XII Bersaglieri Battalion, in Pordenone (M113 armored personnel carriers)
  - 32nd Tank Regiment, in Tauriano
    - Command and Services Company, in Tauriano (includes an anti-tank guided missile platoon)
    - III Tank Battalion, in Tauriano (M60A1 Patton main battle tanks)
    - V Tank Battalion, in Tauriano (M60A1 Patton main battle tanks)
    - XXIII Bersaglieri Battalion, in Tauriano (M113 armored personnel carriers)
  - 132nd Tank Regiment, in Aviano
    - Command and Services Company, in Aviano (includes an anti-tank guided missile platoon)
    - VIII Tank Battalion, in Aviano (M60A1 Patton main battle tanks)
    - X Tank Battalion, in Aviano (M60A1 Patton main battle tanks)
    - XXXVIII Bersaglieri Battalion, in Aviano (M113 armored personnel carriers)
  - 132nd Armored Artillery Regiment, in Casarsa della Delizia
    - Command and Services Battery, in Casarsa della Delizia
    - I Self-propelled Field Artillery Group, in Vacile (M109G 155 mm self-propelled howitzers)
    - II Self-propelled Field Artillery Group, in Sequals (M109G 155 mm self-propelled howitzers)
    - III Self-propelled Field Artillery Group, in Maniago (M109G 155mm self-propelled howitzers)
    - IV Heavy Self-propelled Field Artillery Group, in Casarsa della Delizia (M109G 155mm self-propelled howitzers)
    - V Heavy Self-propelled Artillery Group, in Casarsa della Delizia (M55 203 mm self-propelled howitzers)
    - VI Light Anti-aircraft Artillery Group (Reserve), in Casarsa della Delizia (Bofors 40 mm anti-aircraft guns and 12.7mm anti-aircraft machine guns)
    - Artillery Specialists Battery, in Casarsa della Delizia
  - "Cavalleggeri Guide" Squadrons Group, in Casarsa della Delizia (Fiat Campagnola reconnaissance vehicles and M47 Patton tanks)
  - LXXIII Infantry Fortification Battalion "Lombardia", in Arzene / Latisana
  - Light Aviation Unit "Ariete", at Casarsa Air Base (L-19E Bird Dog light aircraft and AB 206 reconnaissance helicopters)
  - Engineer Battalion "Ariete", in Motta di Livenza
  - Signal Battalion "Ariete", in Casarsa della Delizia
  - Services Grouping "Ariete", in Pordenone
    - Command and Services Company, in Pordenone
    - Supply, Repairs, Recovery Unit "Ariete", in Pordenone
    - Transport Unit "Ariete", in Pordenone
    - I Services Battalion "Ariete", in Pordenone
    - II Services Battalion "Ariete", in Vacile
    - III Services Battalion "Ariete", in Maniago

In 1975, the Italian Army undertook a major reorganization of its forces: the regimental level was abolished, and battalions came under direct command of newly formed multi-arms brigades. The 8th Bersaglieri Regiment became the 8th Mechanized Brigade "Garibaldi" based in Pordenone, the 32nd Tank Regiment became the 32nd Armored Brigade "Mameli" based in Tauriano, and the 132nd Tank Regiment became the 132nd Armored Brigade "Manin" in Aviano. All three brigades were named for personalities of the First Italian War of Independence. On 1 October 1975, the Ariete took command of the three brigades and additional units to bring it up to full strength.

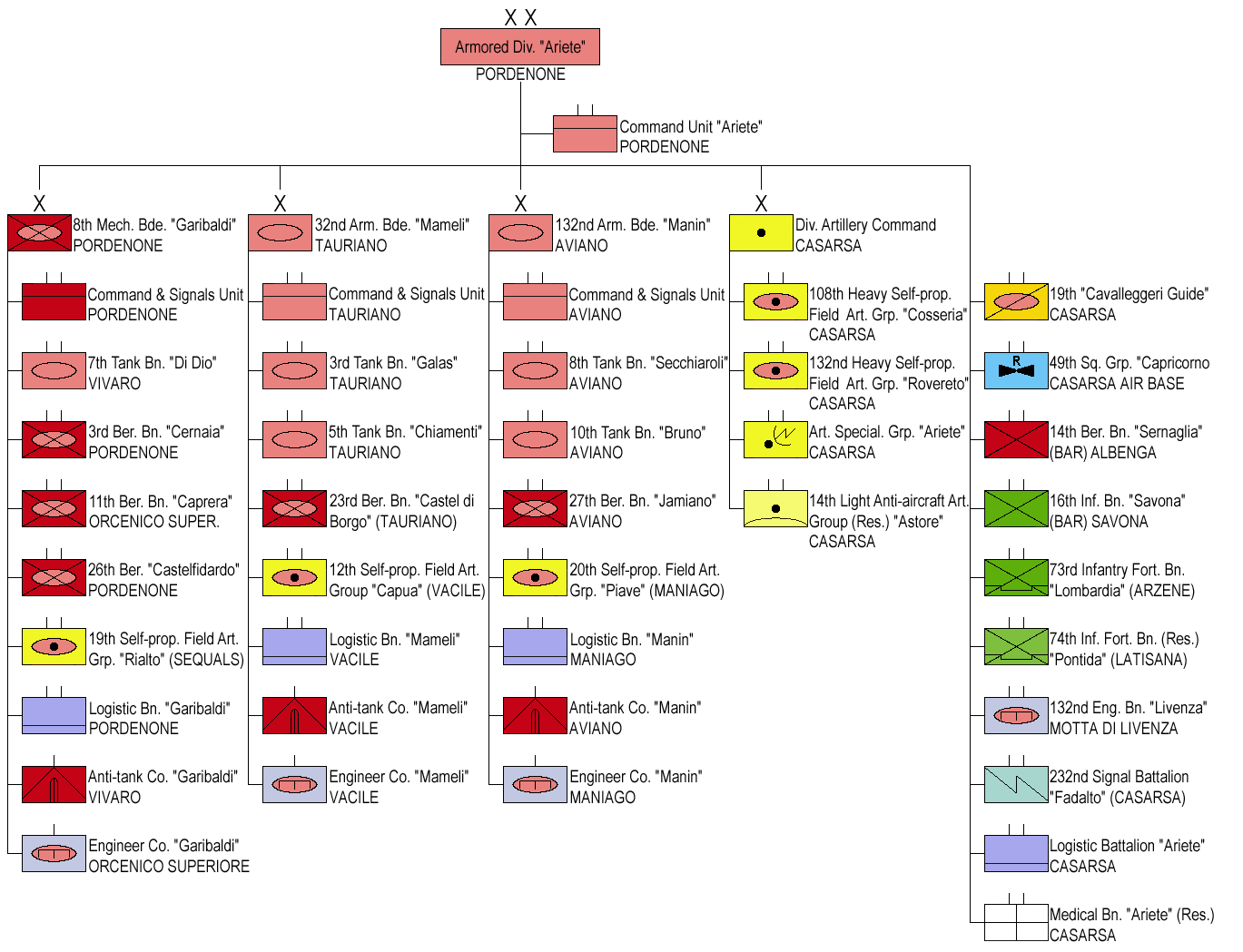
Armored Division "Ariete" in 1977

- Armored Division "Ariete", in Pordenone
  - Command Unit "Ariete", in Pordenone
  - Divisional Artillery Command, in Casarsa della Delizia
    - 108th Heavy Self-propelled Field Artillery Group "Cosseria", in Casarsa della Delizia (M109G 155 mm self-propelled howitzers)
    - 132nd Heavy Self-propelled Field Artillery Group "Rovereto", in Casarsa della Delizia (M109G 155mm self-propelled howitzers)
    - Artillery Specialists Group "Ariete", in Casarsa della Delizia
    - 14th Light Anti-aircraft Artillery Group "Astore" (Reserve), in Casarsa della Delizia
  - 19th Squadrons Group "Cavalleggeri Guide", in Casarsa della Delizia (M47 Patton tanks, M113 armored personnel carriers and AR59 Campagnola reconnaissance vehicles)
  - 14th Bersaglieri (Recruits Training) Battalion "Sernaglia", in Albenga
  - 16th Infantry (Recruits Training) Battalion "Savona", in Savona
  - 73rd Infantry Fortification Battalion "Lombardia", in Arzene (9x companies)
  - 132nd Engineer Battalion "Livenza", in Motta di Livenza
  - 232nd Signal Battalion "Fadalto", in Casarsa della Delizia
  - Logistic Battalion "Ariete", in Casarsa della Delizia
  - 49th Reconnaissance Helicopters Squadrons Group "Capricorno", at Casarsa Airport
    - Command and Services Squadron
    - 491st Reconnaissance Helicopters Squadron (AB 206 reconnaissance helicopters)
    - 492nd Reconnaissance Helicopters Squadron (AB 206 reconnaissance helicopters)
  - Medical Battalion "Ariete" (Reserve), in Casarsa della Delizia
  - Carabinieri Company "Ariete", in Pordenone
  - 8th Mechanized Brigade "Garibaldi", in Pordenone
    - Command and Signal Unit "Garibaldi", in Pordenone
    - 7th Tank Battalion "M.O. Di Dio", in Vivaro (M60A1 Patton main battle tanks)
    - 3rd Bersaglieri Battalion "Cernaia", in Pordenone
    - 11th Bersaglieri Battalion "Caprera", in Orcenico Superiore
    - 26th Bersaglieri Battalion "Castelfidardo", in Pordenone
    - 19th Self-propelled Field Artillery Group "Rialto", in Sequals (M109G 155 mm self-propelled howitzers)
    - Logistic Battalion "Garibaldi", in Pordenone
    - Anti-tank Company "Garibaldi", in Vivaro (BGM-71 TOW anti-tank guided missiles)
    - Engineer Company "Garibaldi", in Orcenico Superiore
  - 32nd Armored Brigade "Mameli", in Tauriano
    - Command and Signal Unit "Mameli", in Tauriano
    - 3rd Tank Battalion "M.O. Galas", in Tauriano (M60A1 Patton main battle tanks)
    - 5th Tank Battalion "M.O. Chiamenti", in Tauriano (M60A1 Patton main battle tanks)
    - 23rd Bersaglieri Battalion "Castel di Borgo", in Tauriano
    - 12th Self-propelled Field Artillery Group "Capua", in Vacile (M109G 155 mm self-propelled howitzers)
    - Logistic Battalion "Mameli", in Vacile
    - Anti-tank Company "Mameli", in Vacile (BGM-71 TOW anti-tank guided missiles)
    - Engineer Company "Mameli", in Vacile
  - 132nd Armored Brigade "Manin", in Aviano
    - Command and Signal Unit "Manin", in Aviano
    - 8th Tank Battalion "M.O. Secchiaroli", in Aviano (M60A1 Patton main battle tanks)
    - 10th Tank Battalion "M.O. Bruno", in Aviano (M60A1 Patton main battle tanks)
    - 27th Bersaglieri Battalion "Jamiano", in Aviano
    - 20th Self-propelled Field Artillery Group "Piave", in Maniago (M109G 155 mm self-propelled howitzers)
    - Logistic Battalion "Manin", in Maniago
    - Anti-tank Company "Manin", in Aviano (BGM-71 TOW anti-tank guided missiles)
    - Engineer Company "Manin", in Maniago

The division also stored the equipment for 16 companies of a second fortification battalion in Latisana, which in case of war would have been filled with reservists and named 74th Infantry Fortification Battalion "Pontida".

=== Armored Brigade "Ariete" ===
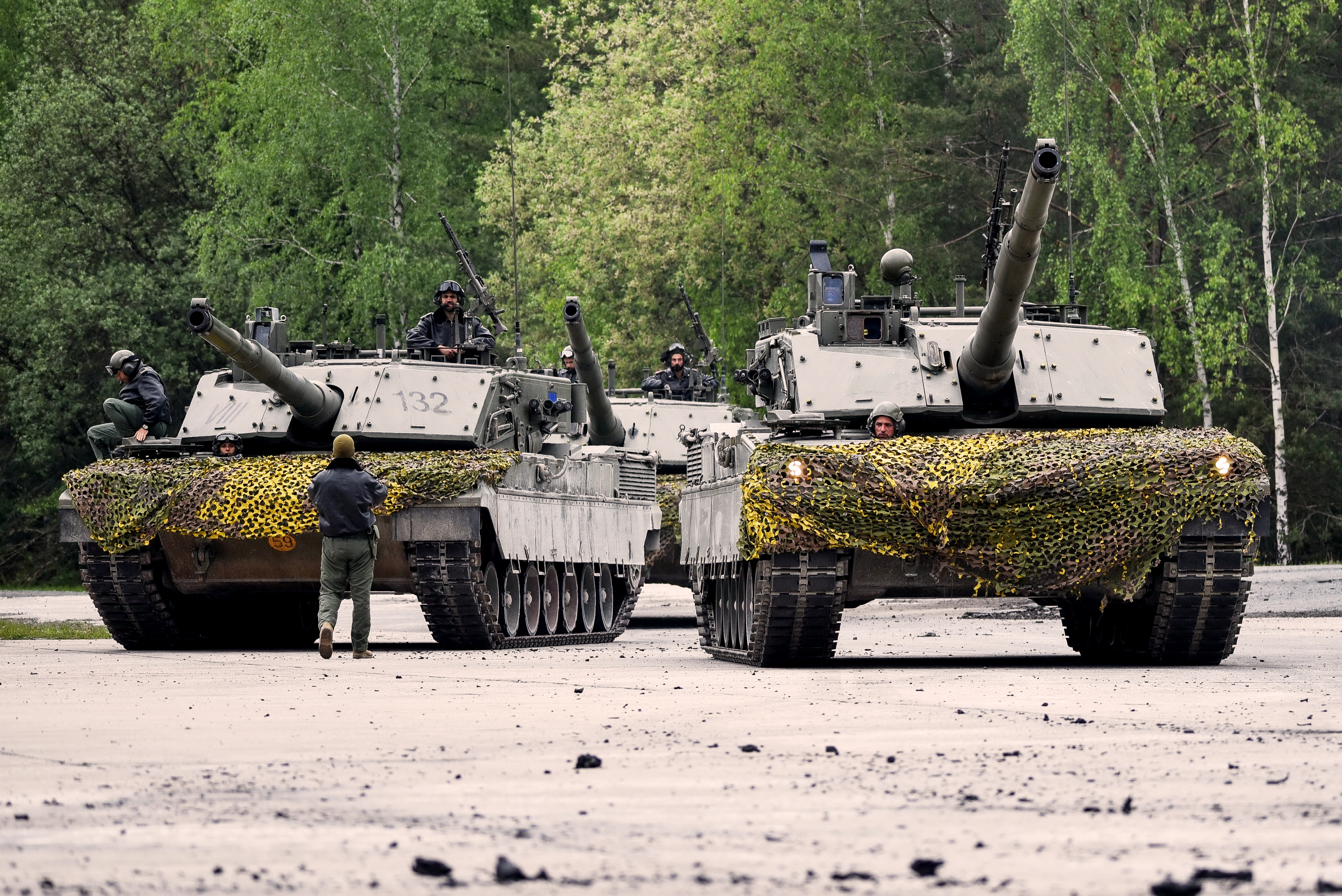
Ariete main battle tanks of the 8th Tank Battalion "M.O. Secchiaroli", 132nd Tank Regiment

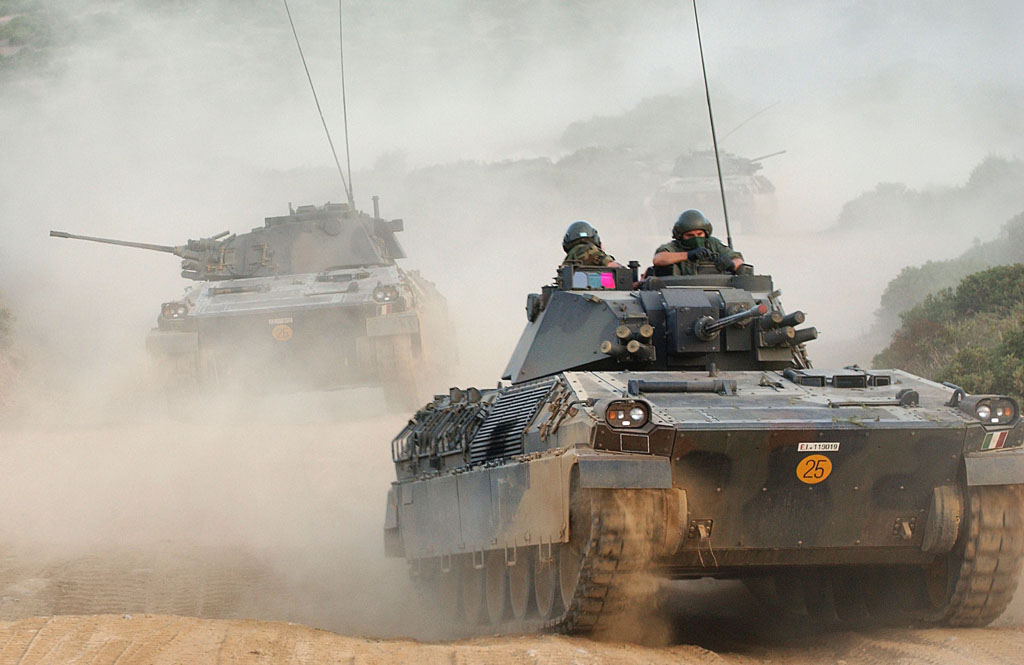
Dardo

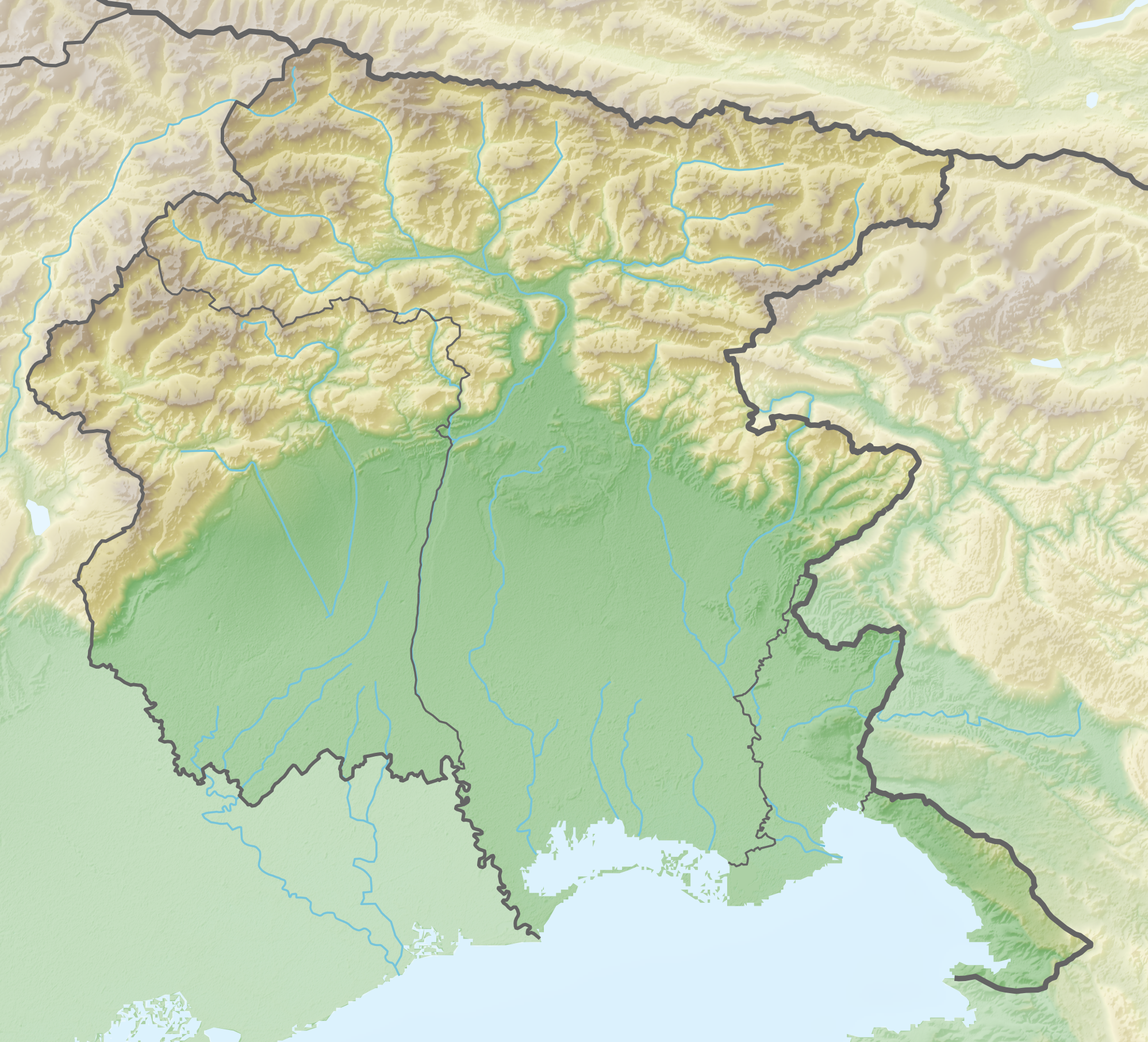
Ariete units in 1989

On 1 October 1986, the Italian Army abolished the divisional level, and brigades, which until then had been under one of the Army's four divisions, came forthwith under direct command of the Army's 3rd Army Corps or 5th Army Corps. As the Armored Division "Ariete" carried a historically significant name, the division ceased to exist on 30 September in Pordenone. Still, the next day, the 132nd Armored Brigade "Ariete" was activated in the exact location. The new brigade took command of the units of the 132nd Armored Brigade "Manin", whose name was stricken from the roll of active units of the Italian Army.

The brigade came under direct command of the 5th Army Corps. The 5th Army Corps was tasked (with defending the Yugoslav-Italian border against possible attacks by either the Warsaw Pact, Yugoslavia, or both. The brigade's authorized strength was 3,381 men (214 Officers, 516 non-commissioned officers, and 2,651 soldiers), and it was initially composed of the following units:

- 132nd Armored Brigade "Ariete", in Pordenone
  - Command and Signal Unit "Ariete", in Pordenone
  - 8th Tank Battalion "M.O. Secchiaroli", in Aviano (M60A1 Patton main battle tanks)
  - 10th Tank Battalion "M.O. Bruno", in Aviano (M60A1 Patton main battle tanks)
  - 13th Tank Battalion "M.O. Pascucci", in Cordenons (Leopard 1A2 main battle tanks, transferred from the Mechanized Brigade "Brescia" on 1 October 1986)
  - 27th Bersaglieri Battalion "Jamiano", in Aviano (VCC-1 armored personnel carriers)
  - 20th Self-propelled Field Artillery Group "Piave", in Maniago (M109G 155 mm self-propelled howitzers)
  - Logistic Battalion "Ariete", in Maniago
  - Anti-tank Company "Ariete", in Aviano (BGM-71 TOW anti-tank guided missiles)
  - Engineer Company "Ariete", in Maniago

=== After the Cold War ===
On 10 January 1991, the brigade disbanded the 10th Tank Battalion and the 20th Artillery Group. In December 1989, the 13th Tank Battalion was reduced to a reserve unit and transferred to the Mechanized Brigade "Mantova". As a replacement, the brigade received units from brigades disbanded during the army's drawdown of forces after the end of the Cold War in 1991: from the disbanded Armored Brigade "Mameli" came the 3rd Tank Battalion "M.O. Galas", the 5th Tank Battalion "M.O. Chiamenti" and the 23rd Bersaglieri Battalion "Castel di Borgo" and from the 8th Mechanized Brigade "Garibaldi", which had moved to Caserta in the south of Italy, came the 19th Self-propelled Field Artillery Group "Rialto" and 26th Bersaglieri Battalion "Castelfidardo", which left the brigade already after half a year.

In 1992 the brigade received the 2nd (Recruits Training) Battalion "Pordenone", while the 23rd Bersaglieri Battalion moved to Trapani in Sicily to join the Mechanized Brigade "Aosta". The same year, the brigade's battalions returned to be called regiments, although size and composition did not change. On 31 July 1995, the 63rd Tank Regiment in Cordenons transferred from the Mechanized Brigade "Mantova" to the Ariete. On 30 November of the same year, the 63rd Tank Regiment was renamed the 132nd Tank Regiment, and the tank unit in Aviano was disbanded.

In 1997, the 33rd Tank Regiment of the Mechanized Brigade "Friuli" arrived. When the Mechanized Brigade "Mantova" was disbanded on 30 August of the same year, the Ariete received the 82nd Mechanized Infantry Regiment "Torino" in Cormons. Still, on November 5, 2001, the 82nd Regiment moved to Barletta in Southern Italy to join the Armored Brigade "Pinerolo". On 1 December 2000, the Ariete received the 10th Engineer Regiment. When the Armored Brigade "Centauro" disbanded on 5 October 2002, the Ariete received the 3rd Bersaglieri Regiment and the 4th Tank Regiment. On 25 November 2009, the 3rd Bersaglieri Regiment moved to Sardinia and joined the Mechanized Brigade "Sassari".

== Missions ==
In 1998, the brigade's headquarters, Command and Tactical Support Battalion, and Logistic Battalion were deployed for a tour of duty in Sarajevo (Bosnia and Herzegovina) under the provision of the SFOR mandate for Operation Constant Forge. Later, the brigade deployed three times to Kosovo (1999–2000, 2001, 2002) in Operation Joint Guardian and later in Operation Consistent Effort, attached to NATO's Kosovo Force.

In 2001, the first enlisted women joined the ranks of the brigade. Female NCOs and officers later followed these.

In 2002, elements from the 10th Engineer Regiment and 2004, the 132nd Artillery Regiment were deployed to Afghanistan. A significant part of the brigade was deployed to Iraq twice - first in early 2004 and second from late 2005 to early 2006. The latest overseas commitments were two deployments to Lebanon from early October 2007 to Spring 2008, then again in early summer to late fall 2009. Minor contributions of personnel (staff officers and NCOs) have been made. They are being provided to nearly all overseas commitments of the Italian Army, from the Balkans to Multinational HQs worldwide, including OMLT mentors supporting and advising the Afghan National Army in its struggle against insurgents.

== Organization ==
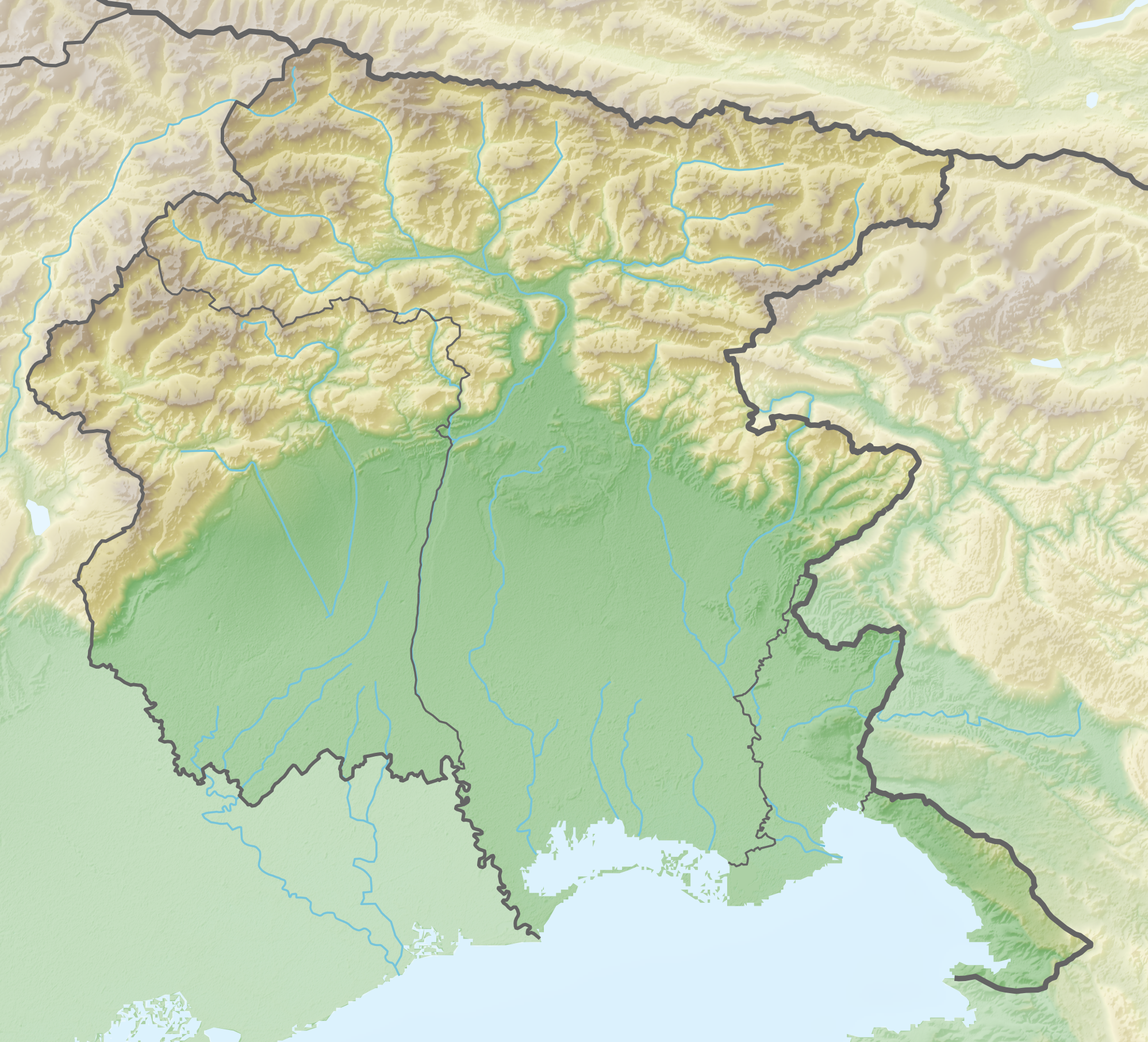
Ariete units in 2022
(The 10th Engineer Regiment is based in Cremona in Lombardy)

32nd Tank Regiment Ariete main battle tanks during an exercise

The 132nd Armored Brigade "Ariete" together (the Bersaglieri Brigade "Garibaldi" form the heavy component of the Italian Army. The brigade is part of the Division "Vittorio Veneto" based in Florence. During the 2013 reform the brigade transferred the 4th Tank Regiment to the Bersaglieri Brigade "Garibaldi" and received the Regiment "Lancieri di Novara" (5th) from the Cavalry Brigade "Pozzuolo del Friuli". The brigade headquarter is based in Pordenone and as of 4 October 2022 the brigade consists of the following units:

- 132nd Armored Brigade "Ariete", in Pordenone
  - 7th Tank Command and Tactical Supports Unit "M.O. Di Dio", in Pordenone (Friuli-Venezia Giulia)
  - Regiment "Lancieri di Novara" (5th), in Codroipo (Centauro tank destroyers and VTLM Lince vehicles)
  - 32nd Tank Regiment, in Tauriano (Ariete main battle tanks)
  - 132nd Tank Regiment, in Cordenons (Ariete main battle tanks)
  - 11th Bersaglieri Regiment, in Orcenico Superiore (Dardo infantry fighting vehicles)
  - 132nd Field Artillery Regiment "Ariete", in Maniago (PzH 2000 self-propelled howitzers)
  - 10th Engineer Regiment, in Cremona
  - Logistic Regiment "Ariete", in Maniago

All regiments are battalion sized.

== Equipment ==
The tank regiments are equipped with Ariete main battle tanks. The Bersaglieri regiment fields Dardo infantry fighting vehicles. The "Lancieri di Novara" Cavalry regiment is equipped with a mix of Centauro tank destroyers and VTLM Lince vehicles. The artillery regiment is equipped with PzH 2000 self-propelled howitzers.

== Gorget patches ==
The personnel of the brigade's units wears the following gorget patches:

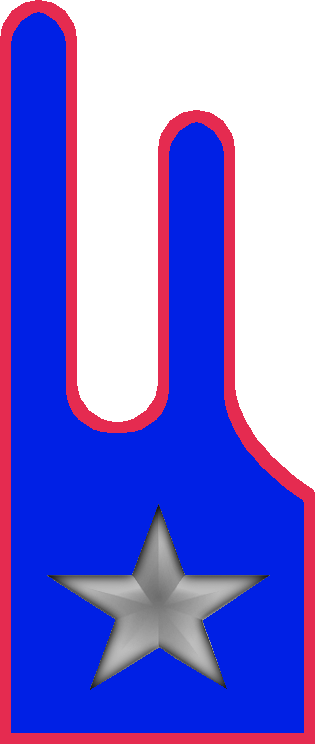
7th Tank Command and Tactical Supports Unit "M.O. Di Dio"

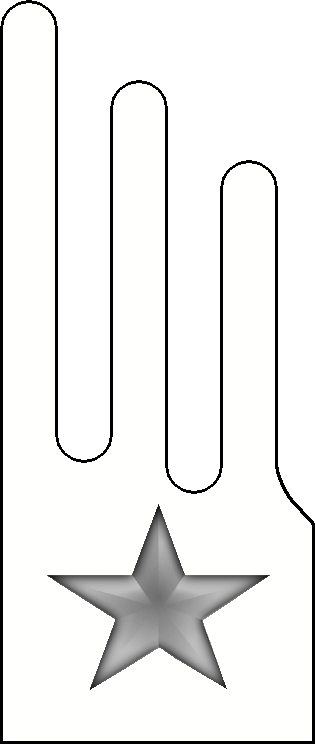
Regiment "Lancieri di Novara" (5th)

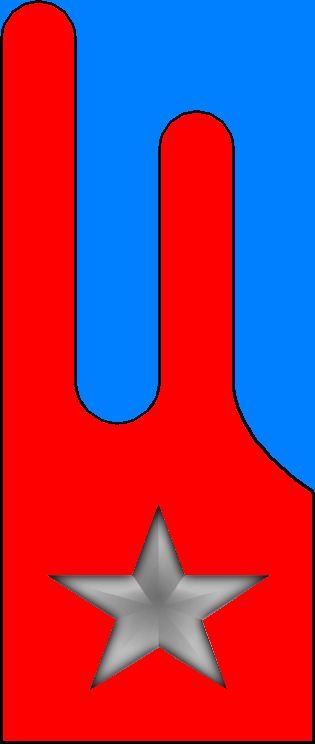
32nd Tank Regiment

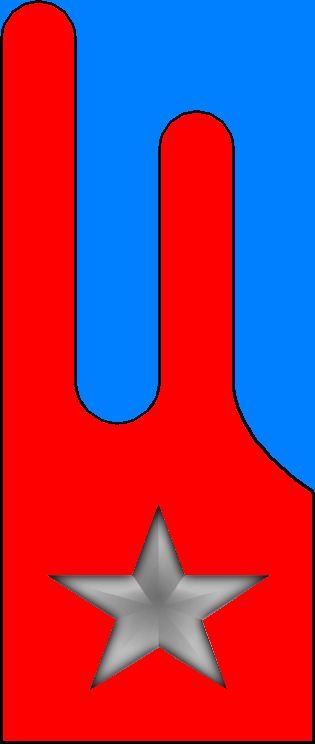
132nd Tank Regiment

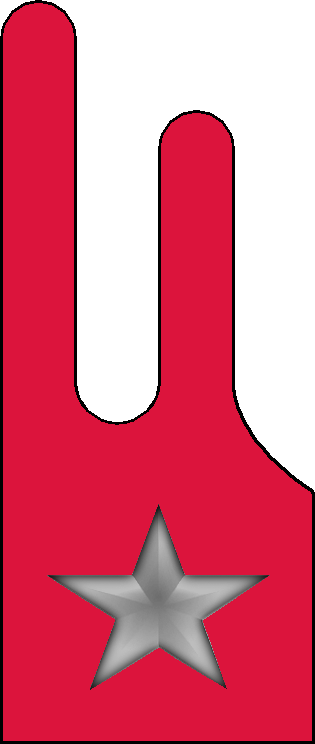
11th Bersaglieri Regiment

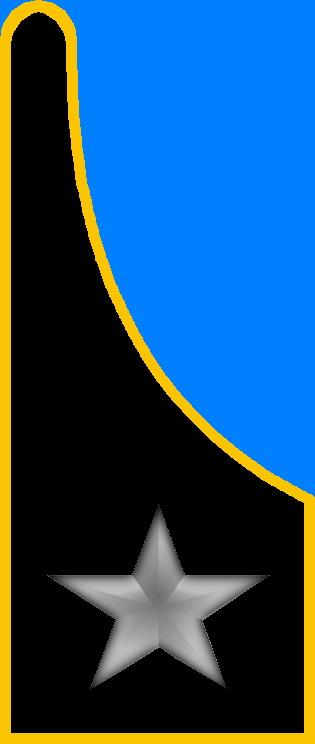
132nd Field Artillery Regiment "Ariete"

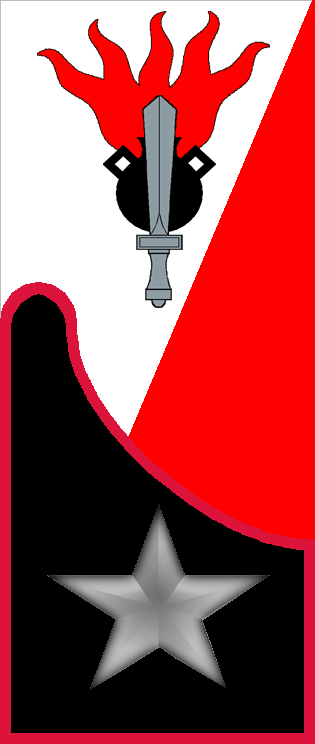
10th Engineer Regiment

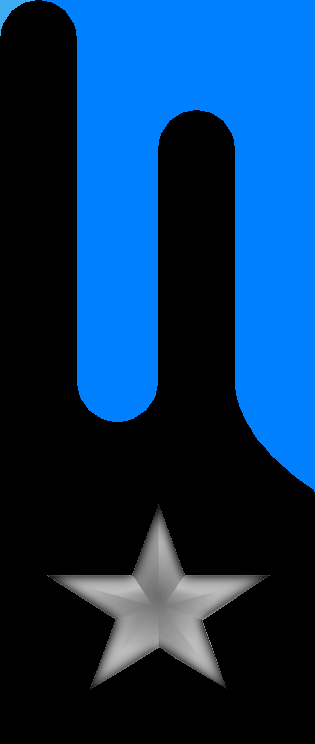
Logistic Regiment "Ariete"
