= Logistic Regiment "Ariete" =

Active Italian Army brigade logistics unit

- Reggimento Logistico "Ariete"
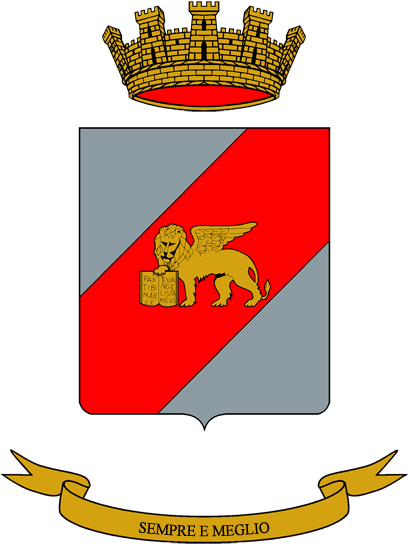
- Regimental coat of arms
- Active: 1 Nov. 1975 — today
- Country: Italy
- Branch: Italian Army
- Role: Military logistics
- Part of: 132nd Armored Brigade "Ariete"
- Garrison/HQ: Maniago
- Motto(s): "Sempre e meglio"
- Anniversaries: 22 May 1916 - Battle of Asiago
- Decorations: 1× Bronze Cross of Army Merit

Insignia
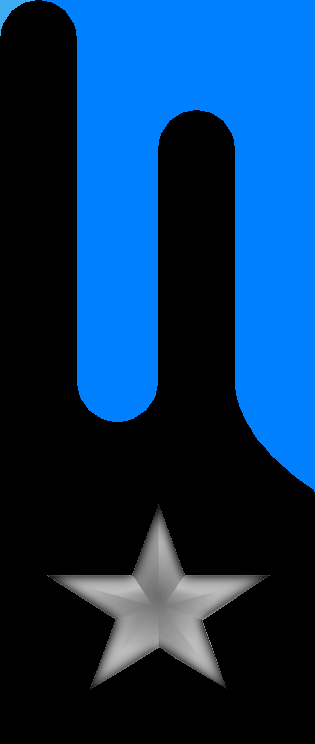
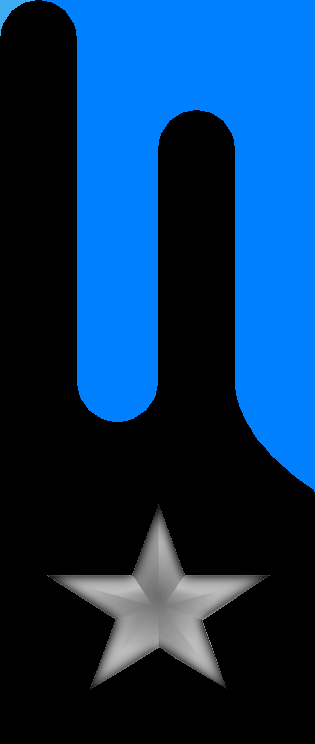
- Unit gorget patches

The Logistic Regiment "Ariete" (Italian: Reggimento Logistico "Ariete") is a military logistics regiment of the Italian Army based in Maniago in Friuli-Venezia Giulia. Today the regiment is the logistic unit of the 132nd Armored Brigade "Ariete". The regiment's anniversary falls, as for all units of the Italian Army's Transport and Materiel Corps, on 22 May, the anniversary of the Royal Italian Army's first major use of automobiles to transport reinforcements to the Asiago plateau to counter the Austro-Hungarian Asiago Offensive in May 1916.

== History ==
=== Cold War ===
In 1963, the Italian Army reorganized its armored divisions along NATO standards and added a brigade level to the divisions' organization. As part of the reorganization the Armored Division "Ariete" formed a services battalion for each of its three brigades. On 1 June 1963, the III Services Battalion "Ariete" was formed in Maniago and assigned to the III Armored Brigade "Ariete".

Initially the battalion consisted of a command, a command platoon, an auto unit, a mobile workshop, a mixed services platoon, and provisions team. On 1 January 1966, the battalion was reorganized and consisted afterwards of a command, a command and services company, an auto unit, a medical company, and a Resupply, Repairs, Recovery Unit. On 30 September 1968, the division's three brigade headquarters were disbanded and the next day, on 1 October 1968, the III Services Battalion "Ariete" was assigned to the division's Services Grouping Command "Ariete".

As part of the 1975 army reform the Armored Division "Ariete" was reorganized and three new brigades were formed with the division's units: on 1 October 1975, the 32nd Armored Brigade "Mameli" and on 1 November 1975, the 8th Mechanized Brigade "Garibaldi" and 132nd Armored Brigade "Manin". On 1 November 1975, the III Services Battalion "Ariete" was renamed Logistic Battalion "Manin" and assigned to the 132nd Mechanized Brigade "Manin". Initially the battalion consisted of a command, a command platoon, a supply and transport company, a medium workshop, and a vehicle park. At the time the battalion fielded 692 men (38 officers, 85 non-commissioned officers, and 569 soldiers).

On 12 November 1976, the President of the Italian Republic Giovanni Leone granted with decree 846 the battalion its flag.

In 1981, the battalion added a reserve medical unit. The same year the battalion was reorganized and consisted afterwards of the following units:

- Logistic Battalion "Manin", in Maniago
  - Command and Services Company
  - Supply Company
  - Maintenance Company
  - Medium Transport Company
  - Medical Unit (Reserve)

In 1986, the Italian Army abolished the divisional level and brigades, which until then had been under one of the Army's four divisions, came under direct command of the army's 3rd Army Corps or 5th Army Corps. As the Armored Division "Ariete" carried the traditions of the 132nd Armored Division "Ariete", which had distinguished itself in the Western Desert campaign of World War II, the army decided to retain the name of the division. On 30 September 1986, the command of the Armored Division "Ariete" in Pordenone was disbanded and the next day the command of the Armored Brigade "Manin" moved from Aviano to Pordenone, where the command was renamed 132nd Armored Brigade "Ariete". The "Ariete" brigade retained the Manin's units, which, including the Logistic Battalion "Manin", changed their names from "Manin" to "Ariete".

=== Recent times ===
From December 1992 to March 1994, the battalion provided personnel and materiel for the Unified Task Force and then the United Nations Operation in Somalia II in Somalia. From 6 February to 24 May 2004, the battalion deployed to Iraq as part of the Italian contribution to the Multi-National Force – Iraq. For its conduct and work in Iraq the battalion was awarded a Bronze Cross of Army Merit, which was affixed to the battalion's flag.

On 30 June 2015, the Logistic Battalion "Ariete" lost its autonomy and the next day the battalion entered the newly formed Logistic Regiment "Ariete".

== Organization ==
As of 2024 the Logistic Regiment "Ariete" is organized as follows:

- Logistic Regiment "Ariete", in Maniago
  - Command and Logistic Support Company
  - Logistic Battalion
    - Transport Company
    - Maintenance Company
    - Supply Company

== See also ==
- Military logistics
