= 10th Engineer Regiment (Italy) =

Active Italian Army combat engineer unit

- 10° Reggimento Genio Guastatori
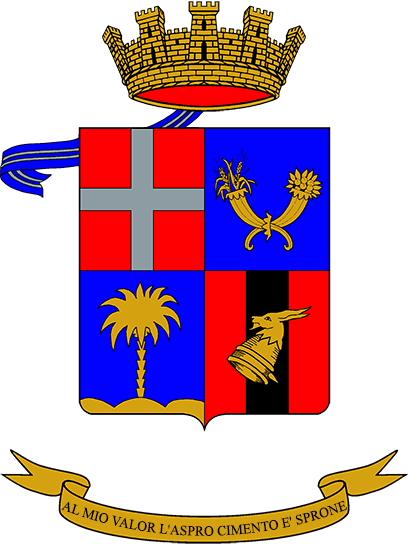
- Regimental coat of arms
- Active: 5 Nov. 1926 — 8 Sept. 1943; 10 Oct. 1975 — today
- Country: Italy
- Branch: Italian Army
- Role: Combat engineers
- Part of: 132nd Armored Brigade "Ariete"
- Garrison/HQ: Cremona
- Motto: "Al mio valor l'aspro cimento è sprone"
- Anniversaries: 24 June 1918 - Second Battle of the Piave River
- Decorations: 1× War Cross of Military Valor; 1× Silver Cross of Army Merit; 1× Bronze Cross of Army Merit; 1× Italian Red Cross Bronze Medal of Merit

Insignia
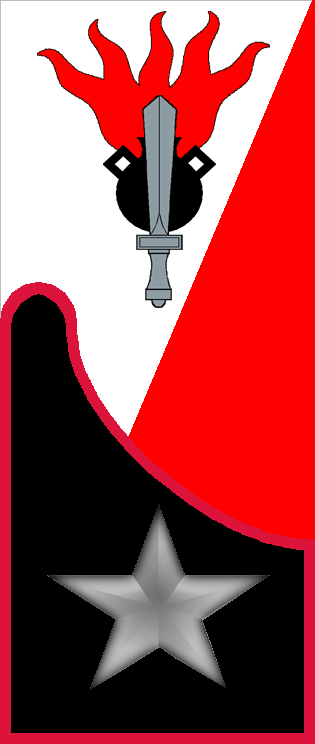
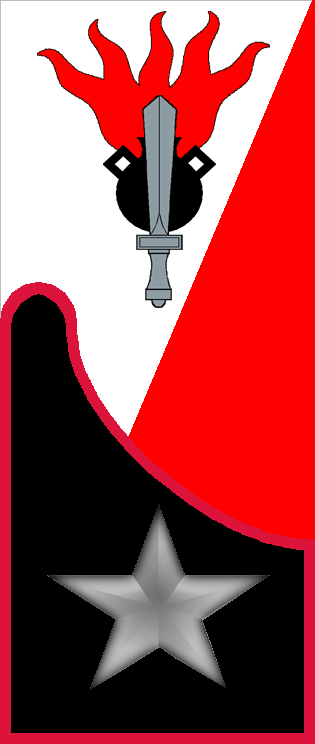
- Sappers gorget patches

The 10th Engineer Regiment (Italian: 10° Reggimento Genio Guastatori) is a military engineering regiment of the Italian Army based in Cremona in Lombardy. The regiment is the engineer unit of the 132nd Armored Brigade "Ariete". In 1926, the Royal Italian Army formed the 10th Engineer Regiment. During the Second Italo-Ethiopian War and during World War II the regiment's depot formed engineer battalions and smaller units, which deployed with divisions and corps to the fronts of the war. After the announcement of the Armistice of Cassibile on 8 September 1943 the regiment was disbanded by invading German forces.

In 1953, the Italian Army formed the III Army Corps Engineer Battalion, which was assigned to the III Army Corps. In 1975, the battalion was named for Lake Lario and assigned the flag and traditions of the 10th Engineer Regiment. In 1993, the battalion lost its autonomy and entered the reformed 10th Pioneers Regiment. Since 2000, the regiment is assigned to the 132nd Armored Brigade "Ariete". The regiment's anniversary falls, as for all engineer units, on 24 June 1918, the last day of the Second Battle of the Piave River.

== History ==
=== Interwar years ===
On 1 October 1922, the Royal Italian Army formed the 8th Army Corps Engineer Grouping in Santa Maria Capua Vetere. The grouping received a Sappers Battalion and a Telegraphers Battalion, which had been formed on 1 April 1920 for the X Army Corps. On the same date, 1 October 1922, the X Army Corps was renumbered as VIII Army Corps. The grouping also received a miners company from the disbanded Miners Engineer Regiment. After its formation the grouping consisted of a command, a sappers-miners battalion, a telegraphers battalion, which included two dovecotes located in Gaeta and Catanzaro, a photo-electricians company, and a depot. In 1926, the VIII Army Corps was renumbered as X Army Corps and consequently, on 5 November 1926, the grouping was renamed 10th Engineer Regiment. During the same year the dovecote in Catanzaro was disbanded. In February 1928, the regiment ceded some of its personnel to help form the depot of the newly formed 11th Engineer Regiment. On 28 October 1932, the regiment received the IV Radio-Telegraphers Battalion of the disbanded 1st Radio-Telegraphers Regiment.

On 23 September 1935, in preparation for the Second Italo-Ethiopian War, the regiment mobilized the X Replacement Sappers Battalion, which provided 1,300 troops to the 8th Engineer Regiment, which was deployed to Ethiopia for the war. On 15 January 1936, the X Replacements Engineer Battalion was disbanded and its remaining personnel incorporated by the 8th Engineer Regiment. In 1935, the regiment also formed the XXXI, XXXII, XXXIII, and XXXIV engineer battalions for the war, and then in 1936 the XXXIII and XXXVIII engineer battalions. In 1936, the regiment also formed the XX and XXXI marching engineer battalions, whose personnel was intended to replace troops already deployed beyond their service time in East Africa.

At the end of March 1936, the regiment consisted of a command, an engineer battalion, a telegraphers battalion, the dovecote in Gaeta, and a depot. In January 1937, the telegraphers and radio-telegraphers battalions were renamed connections battalions. On 1 January 1937, the regiment's depot in Santa Maria Capua Vetere formed the 20th Engineer Regiment for the XX Army Corps, which was based in the wester part of Libya known as Tripolitania.

=== World War II ===
During World War II the regiment's depot in Santa Maria Capua Vetere mobilized the following units:

- Command of the 4th Engineer Grouping (for service in Albania)
- Command of the 130th Marching Regiment (provided replacement personnel for units fighting in the Western Desert campaign)
- X Army Corps Special Engineer Battalion (for the X Army Corps)
- X Army Corps Mixed Connections Battalion (for the X Army Corps)
- XXV Mixed Engineer Battalion (for the 25th Infantry Division "Bologna")
- XXVII Mixed Engineer Battalion (for the 27th Infantry Division "Brescia")
- LV Mixed Engineer Battalion (for the 55th Infantry Division "Savona")
- IV Telegraphers Battalion (for the 4th Engineer Grouping)
- XIX Engineer Battalion (served in the Western Desert campaign)
- XXIII Engineer Battalion (served in the Western Desert campaign)
- XXIV Engineer Battalion (served in the Western Desert campaign)
- XL Workers Group (for service with the Italian 8th Army on the Eastern Front)
- 25th Mobile Dovecote
- and many smaller units

In the evening of 8 September 1943, the Armistice of Cassibile, which ended hostilities between the Kingdom of Italy and the Anglo-American Allies, was announced by General Dwight D. Eisenhower on Radio Algiers and by Marshal Pietro Badoglio on Italian radio. Germany reacted by invading Italy and the 10th Engineer Regiment was disbanded soon thereafter by German forces.

The 4th Engineer Grouping, which was formed on 10 February 1941, left Italy for Albania on 3 March of the same year. The grouping was based in Elbasan and consisted of the IV Telegraphers Battalion, V Cableway Battalion, IX Miners Battalion, XVI Pontieri Battalion, VII Workers Group, XVI Workers Group, and a mobile dovecote. On 1 March 1942, the grouping was reorganized and consisted afterwards of the V Telegraphers Battalion, VI Marconisti Battalion, XII Miners Battalion, and VII Workers Group. After the announcement of the Armistice of Cassibile the grouping was disbanded by German forces. The XL Workers Group served with the Italian 8th Army on the Eastern Front. In December 1942, most of the 8th Army was destroyed during the Soviet Operation Little Saturn. For its conduct and sacrifice on the Eastern Front the XL Workers Group was awarded a War Cross of Military Valor, which was affixed to the regiment's flag.

=== Cold War ===
On 1 April 1953, the Italian Army formed the III Army Corps Engineer Battalion in Pavia in Lombardy by expanding the existing 3rd Territorial Engineer Company. The battalion was assigned to the III Army Corps and, on 1 June 1953, formed a command platoon and the 2nd Engineer Company. In November 1953, the battalion completed its organization with the formation of the Field Park Company.

During the 1975 army reform, the army disbanded the regimental level and newly independent battalions were granted for the first time their own flags. During the reform engineer battalions were named for a lake, if they supported an corps-level command, or a river, if they supported a division or brigade. On 10 October 1975, the III Army Corps Engineer Battalion was renamed 3rd Engineer Battalion "Lario". The battalion was named for the great pre-alpine Lake Como, which is also known as Lake Lario, and located in Lombardy. After the reform the 3rd Engineer Battalion "Lario" consisted of a command, a command and park company, and three engineer companies. At the time the battalion fielded 756 men (38 officers, 98 non-commissioned officers, and 620 soldiers).

On 12 November 1976, the President of the Italian Republic Giovanni Leone assigned with decree 846 the flag and traditions of the 10th Engineer Regiment to the battalion. On 1 January 1987, the Command and Park Company split into the Command and Services Company and the Special Equipment Company. Afterwards the battalion consisted of the following units:

- 3rd Engineer Battalion "Lario", in Pavia
  - Command and Services Company
  - 1st Engineer Company
  - 2nd Engineer Company
  - 3rd Engineer Company
  - Special Equipment Company

=== Recent times ===
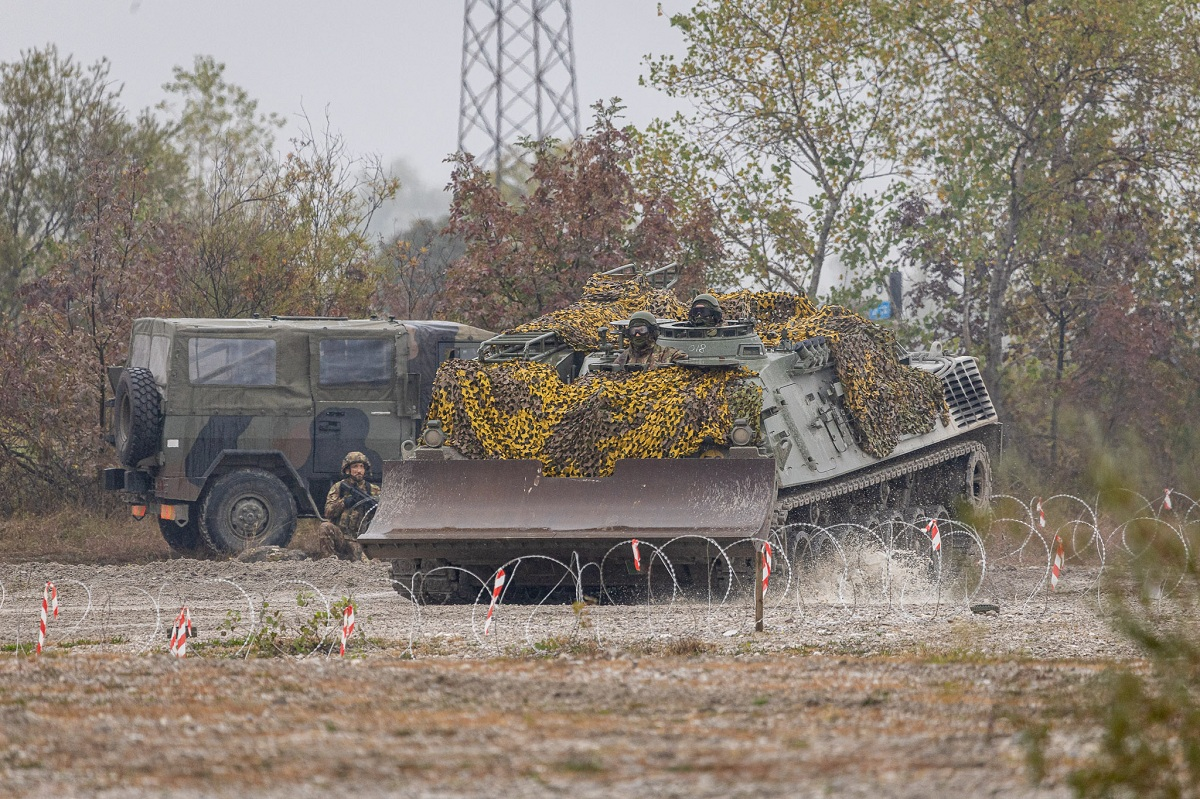
10th Engineer Regiment Bergepanzer 2 armored recovery vehicle during exercise Demetra 2/25

In 1992, the battalion moved from Pavia to Cremona. On 10 June 1993, the 131st Sappers Battalion "Ticino" in Novara was disbanded and part of its personnel joined the 3rd Engineer Battalion "Lario". On 15 August of the same year, the 3rd Engineer Battalion "Lario" lost its autonomy and the next day the battalion entered the reformed 10th Pioneers Regiment. On the same day, the flag and traditions of the 10th Engineer Regiment were transferred from the battalion to the 10th Pioneers Regiment.

On 16 September 1996, the regiment was transferred from the 3rd Army Corps to the Support Units Command "Legnano" and on 24 September of the same year, the regiment was renamed 10th Engineer Regiment. On 31 December 1997, the Support Units Command "Legnano" was disbanded and regiment was transferred to the Projection Forces Command. In June 1999, the regiment deployed to Kosovo for Operation Joint Guardian. On 1 September 2000, the regiment was transferred to the 132nd Armored Brigade "Ariete".

The regiment participated in the following international missions:

- Operation "Joint Forge" (Bosnia and Herzegovina), in 1999 at company level and in 2000 at platoon level
- Operation “Joint Guarantor” (North Macedonia), in 1999 at company level
- Operation Joint Guardian (Kosovo), in 1999 and 2002 at regimental level and in 2000 and 2001 at battalion level
- ISAF (Afghanistan), in 2002, initially at company level and, later with two companies and a Multinational Engineer Group
- Enduring Freedom (Afghanistan), in 2003 with an EOD platoon
- Operation “Decisive Endeavor” (Kosovo), in 2003 at battalion level
- Operation Ancient Babylon (Iraq), in 2004 at regimental level

For its conduct in Iraq the regiment was awarded a Silver Cross of Army Merit, which was affixed to the regiment's flag. After the August 2016 earthquake in Central Italy the regiment's companies deployed to the area to assist in the recovery efforts and to provide engineering services to the affected communities. For its service after the earthquake the regiment was awarded a Bronze Cross of Army Merit, which was affixed to the regiment's flag.

== Organization ==
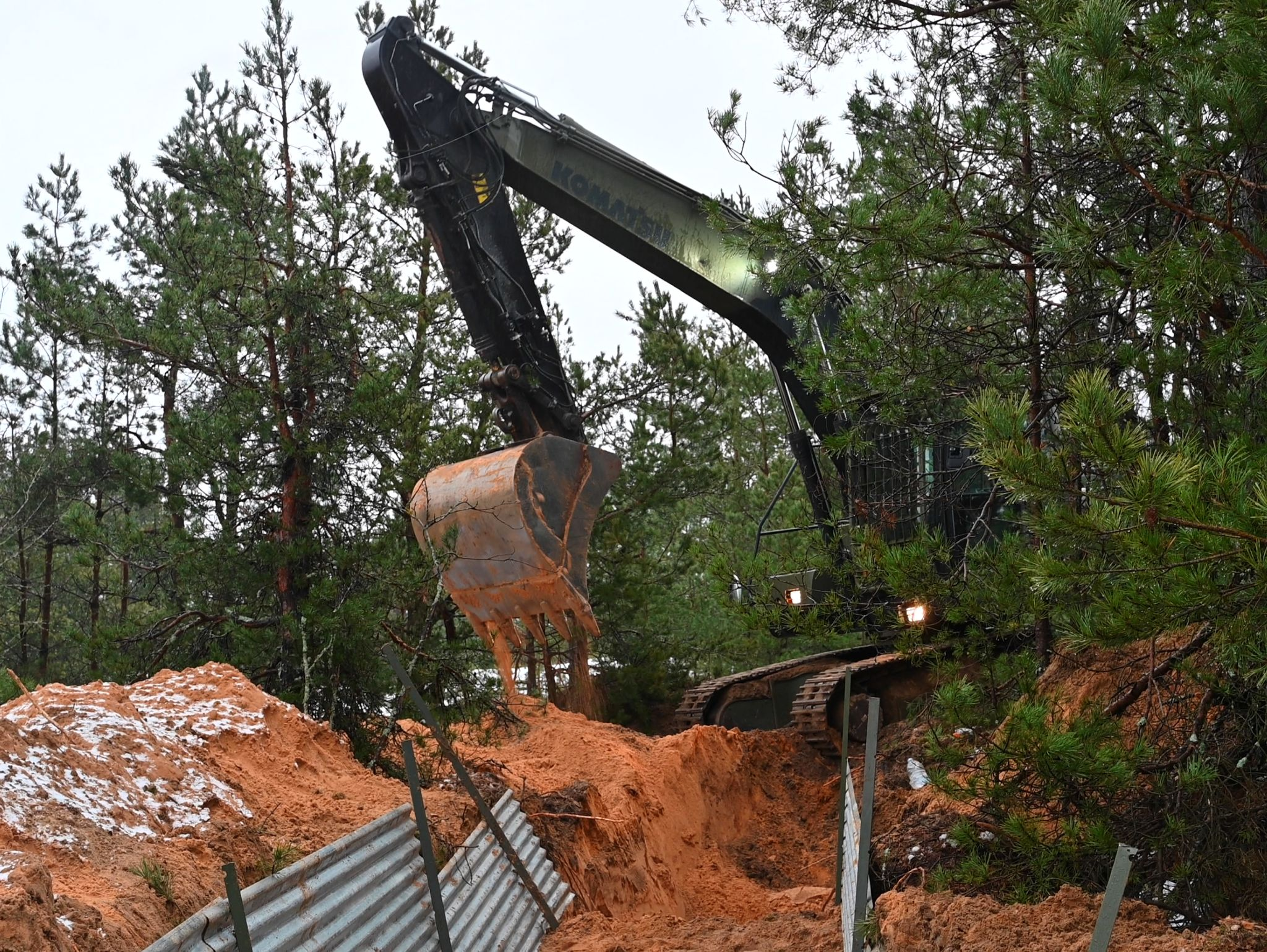
10th Engineer Regiment Komatsu PC210NLC-8 excavator building fortifications during the NATO exercise War Horse Forge in Latvia in January 2025

As of 2025 the 10th Engineer Regiment is organized as follows:

- 10th Engineer Regiment, in Cremona
  - Command and Logistic Support Company
  - Sappers Battalion "Ticino"
    - 1st Sappers Company
    - 4th Sappers Company
    - 5th Sappers Company
    - 6th Deployment Support Company

== See also ==
- 132nd Armored Brigade "Ariete"
