= 132nd Armored Brigade "Manin" =

132^ Brigata Corazzata "Manin"
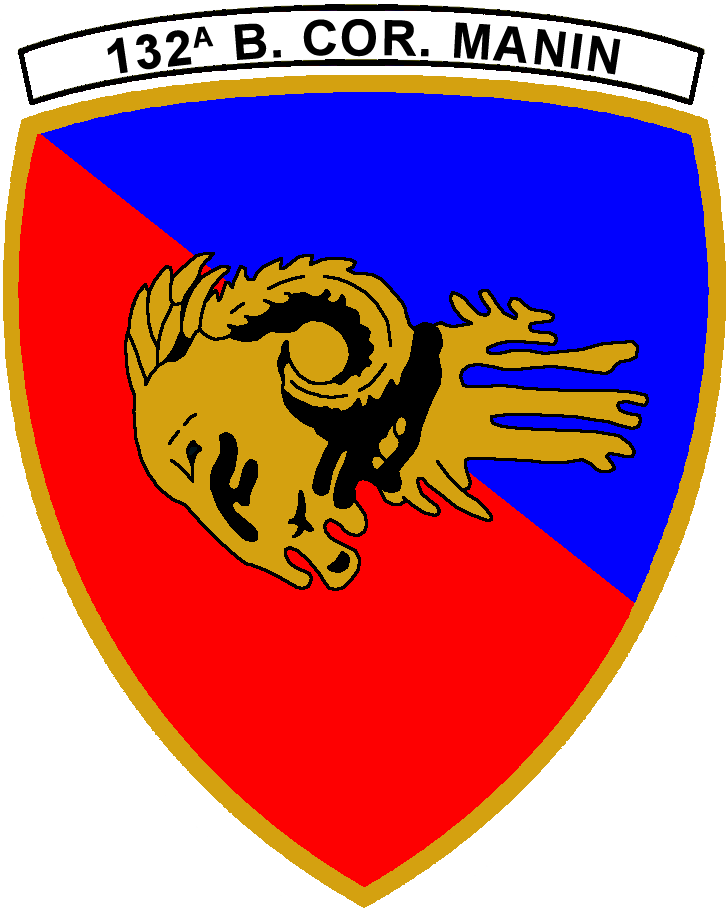
- Coat of Arms of the 132nd Armored Brigade "Manin"
- Active: 1 October 1975 – 1 October 1986
- Country: Italy
- Branch: Italian Army
- Type: "'Cavalry"'
- Role: Armored warfare
- Size: Brigade
- Part of: Armored Division "Ariete"
- Garrison/HQ: Aviano
- Colors: blue and red

The 132nd Armored Brigade "Manin" was a short-lived armored brigade of the Italian Army based in the country's North-East. Its core units were tank and Bersaglieri battalions from the disbanded 132nd Tank Regiment of the 132nd Armored Division "Ariete". The brigade's headquarters was in the city of Aviano and the brigade's name honored the Italian unification hero Daniele Manin.

== Constitution ==
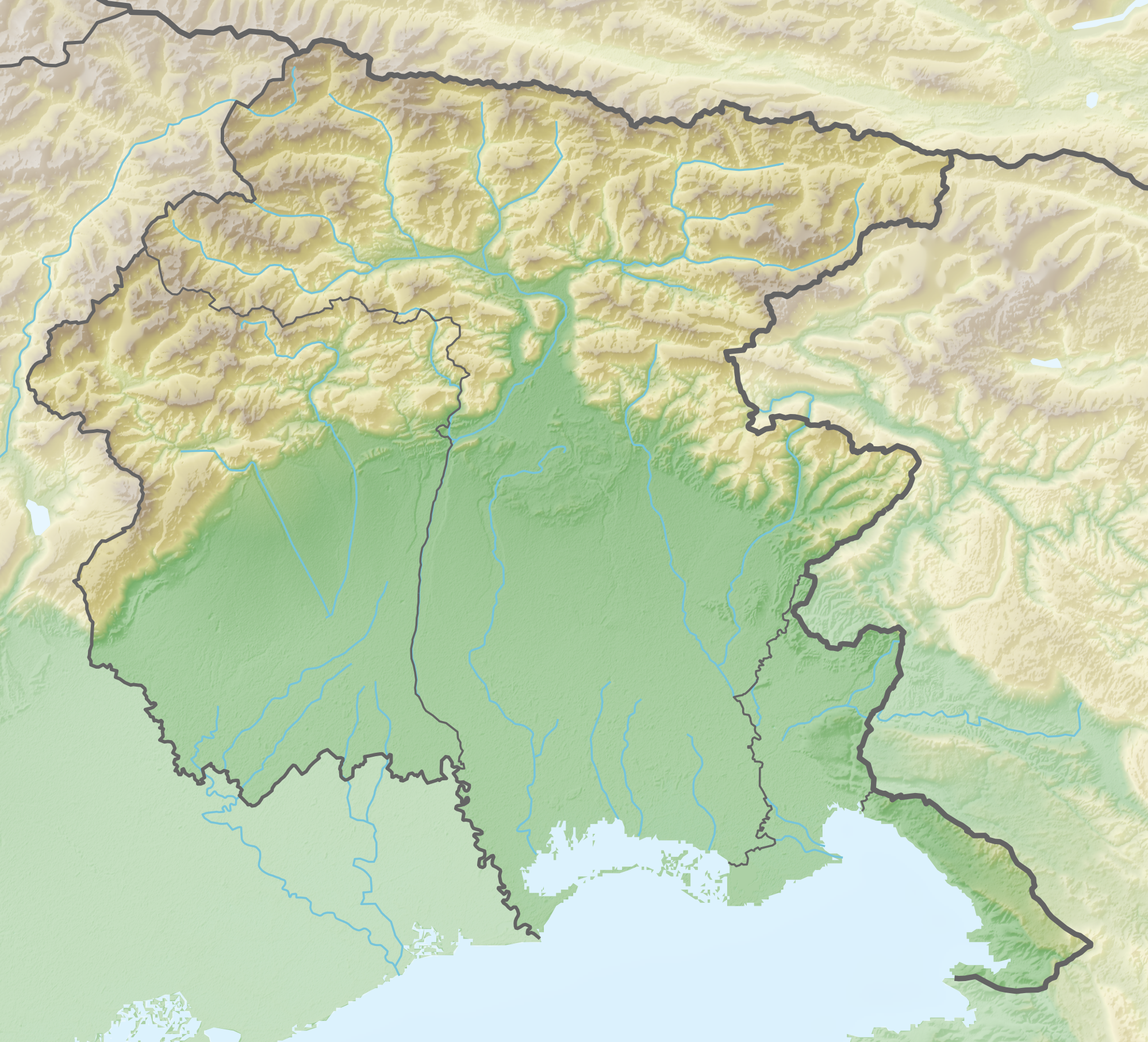
Manin units in 1975

The brigade was activated during 1975 reform of the Italian Army when the regimental level was abolished and battalions came under direct command of newly formed multi-arms brigades. On 1 October 1975 the 132nd Armored Brigade "Manin" was activated along with the 32nd Armored Brigade "Mameli" followed one month later by the 8th Mechanized Brigade "Garibaldi". To raise the Manin the 132nd Tank Regiment of the Armored Division "Ariete" was reorganized and renamed. The Ariete was part of the 5th Army Corps based in North-Eastern Italy, which was tasked with defending the Yugoslav-Italian border against possible attacks by either the Warsaw Pact, or Yugoslavia or both. The Ariete was the corps' armored reserve. The brigade's authorized strength was 3,381 men (214 Officers, 516 non-commissioned officers and 2,651 soldiers) and it consisted initially of the following units:

- 132nd Armored Brigade "Manin", in Aviano
  - Command and Signal Unit "Manin", in Aviano
  - 8th Tank Battalion "M.O. Secchiaroli", in Aviano (M60A1 Patton main battle tanks)
  - 10th Tank Battalion "M.O. Bruno", in Aviano (M60A1 Patton main battle tanks)
  - 27th Bersaglieri Battalion "Jamiano", in Aviano (VCC-1 armored personnel carriers)
  - 20th Self-propelled Field Artillery Group "Piave", in Maniago (M109G 155mm Self-propelled howitzers, former III Self-propelled Field Artillery Group, 132nd Armored Artillery Regiment)
  - Logistic Battalion "Manin", in Maniago (former III Services Battalion "Ariete" of the Services Grouping "Ariete")
  - Anti-tank Company "Manin", in Aviano (BGM-71 TOW anti-tank guided missiles)
  - Engineer Company "Manin", in Maniago

=== Deactivation ===
In 1986 the Italian Army abolished the divisional level and brigades, that until then had been under one of the Army's four divisions, came forthwith under direct command of the Army's 3rd or 5th Army Corps. As the Armored Division "Ariete" carried a historically significant name, the division ceased to exist on 30 September in Pordenone, but the next day in the same location the 132nd Armored Brigade "Ariete" was activated. The new brigade took command of the units of the 132nd Armored Brigade "Manin", whose name was stricken from the roll of active units of the Italian Army.
