= 32nd Armored Brigade "Mameli" =

32^ Brigata Corazzata "Mameli"
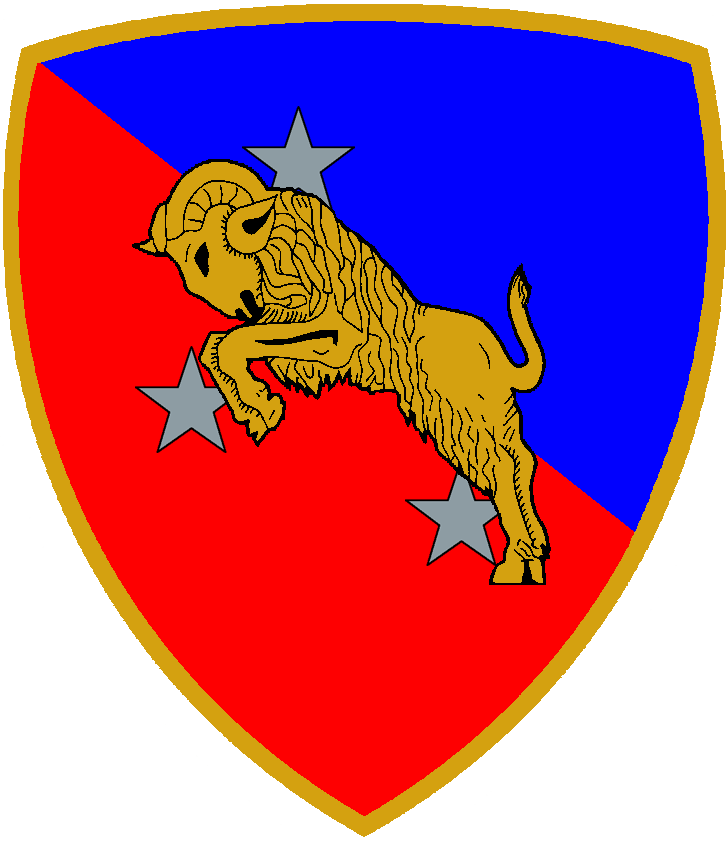
- Coat of Arms of the 32nd Armored Brigade "Mameli" after 1986
- Active: 1 October 1975 – 1 April 1991
- Country: Italy
- Branch: Italian Army
- Role: Armored warfare
- Part of: 1975-1986 Armored Division "Ariete"; 1986-1991 5th Army Corps
- Garrison/HQ: Tauriano

The 32nd Armored Brigade "Mameli" was an armored brigade of the Italian Army. Its core units were tank and Bersaglieri battalions. The brigade was headquartered in the city of Tauriano, a subdivision of the city of Spilimbergo. All the brigade's units were based in Spilimbergo. The brigade's name was chosen to honor the Italian patriot Goffredo Mameli writer of the lyrics of the Italian national anthem. The brigade's sister brigades, the 132nd Armored Brigade "Manin" and 8th Mechanized Brigade "Garibaldi" were named to honor of Daniele Manin and Giuseppe Garibaldi, both heroes of the Italian unification.

== History ==
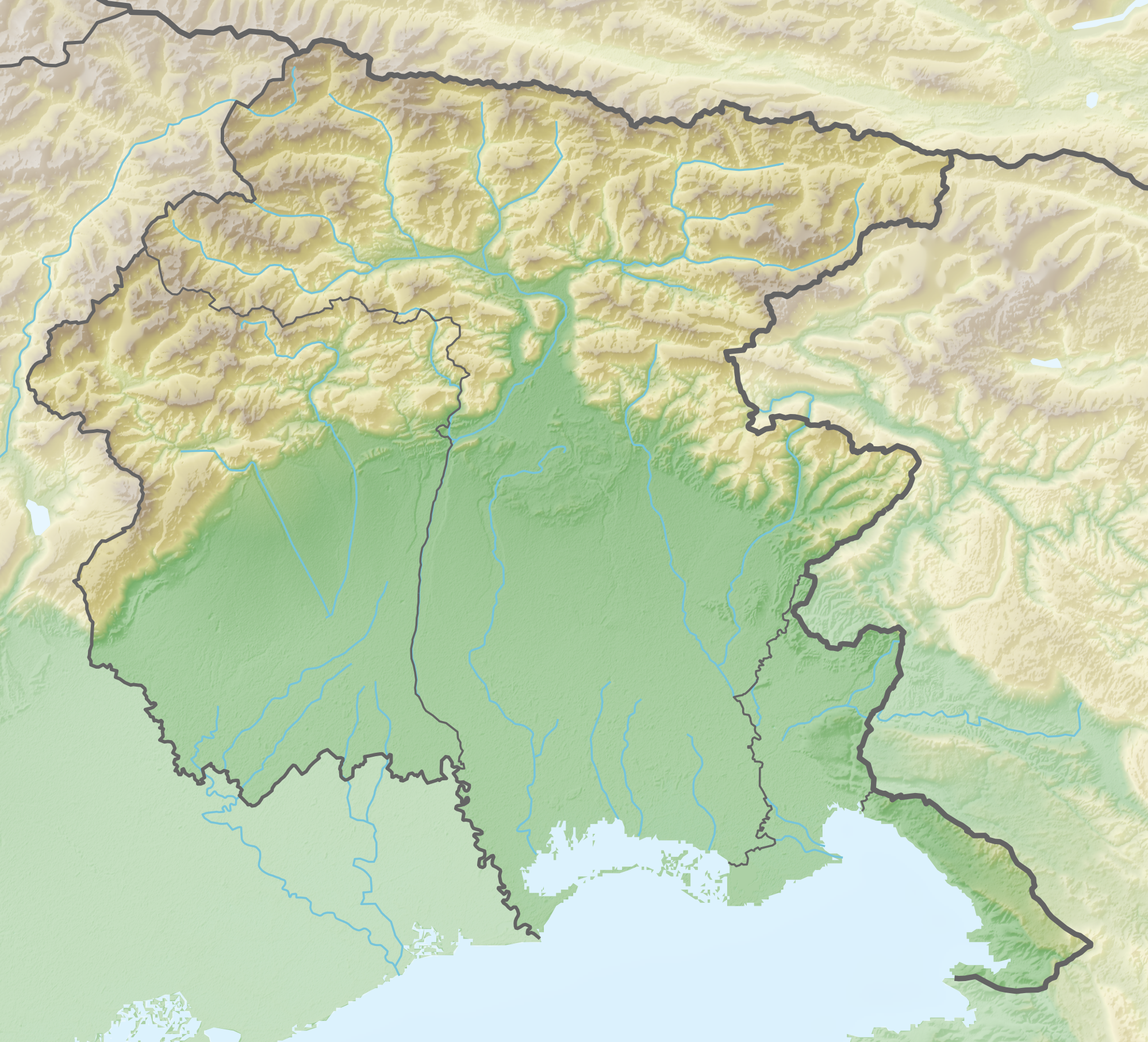
Mameli units in 1989

The brigade was activated during the 1975 Italian Army reform: in 1975 the regimental level was abolished and battalions came under direct command of newly formed multi-arms brigades. On 1 October 1975 the 32nd Armored Brigade "Mameli" was activated along with the 132nd Armored Brigade "Manin" followed one month later by the 8th Mechanized Brigade "Garibaldi". To form the "Mameli" the 32nd Tank Regiment of the Armored Division "Ariete" was reorganized and renamed. The Armored Division "Ariete" was part of the 5th Army Corps based in North-Eastern Italy. The 5th Army Corps was tasked with defending the Yugoslav-Italian border against possible attacks by either the Warsaw Pact, or Yugoslavia, or both. The Ariete was the corps' armored reserve. The brigade's authorized strength was 3,381 men (214 Officers, 516 non-commissioned officers and 2,651 soldiers) and it consisted initially of the following units:

- 32nd Armored Brigade "Mameli", in Tauriano
  - Command and Signal Unit "Mameli", in Tauriano
  - 3rd Tank Battalion "M.O. Galas", in Tauriano (M60A1 Patton main battle tanks)
  - 5th Tank Battalion "M.O. Chiamenti", in Tauriano (M60A1 Patton main battle tanks)
  - 23rd Bersaglieri Battalion "Castel di Borgo", in Tauriano (VCC-1 armored personnel carriers)
  - 12th Self-propelled Field Artillery Group "Capua", in Vacile (M109G 155 mm self-propelled howitzers)
  - Logistic Battalion "Mameli", in Vacile
  - Anti-tank Company "Mameli", in Vacile (BGM-71 TOW anti-tank guided missiles)
  - Engineer Company "Mameli", in Vacile

On 31 October 1986 the Italian Army abolished the divisional level and brigades, that until then had been under one of the Army's four divisions, came forthwith under direct command of the Army's 3rd and 5th Army Corps. The Mameli, Garibaldi and Manin (renamed "Ariete" on the same date) came under direct command of the 5th Army Corps and the Mameli received the 19th Cavalry Reconnaissance Squadron "Cavalleggeri Guide" from the disbanded division.

After the end of the Cold War the Italian Army began to draw down its forces and the Mameli was the first brigade to be disbanded. On 1 April 1991 the brigade was officially deactivated along with some of its subordinate units. The 3rd Tank and 5th tank battalions, and 23rd Bersaglieri Battalion were transferred to the Armored Brigade "Ariete", while the 19th Cavalry Squadron "Cavalleggeri Guide" passed to the Bersaglieri Brigade "Garibaldi".
