= Maniago =

Maniago Manià (Friulian)
- Comune
- Città di Maniago
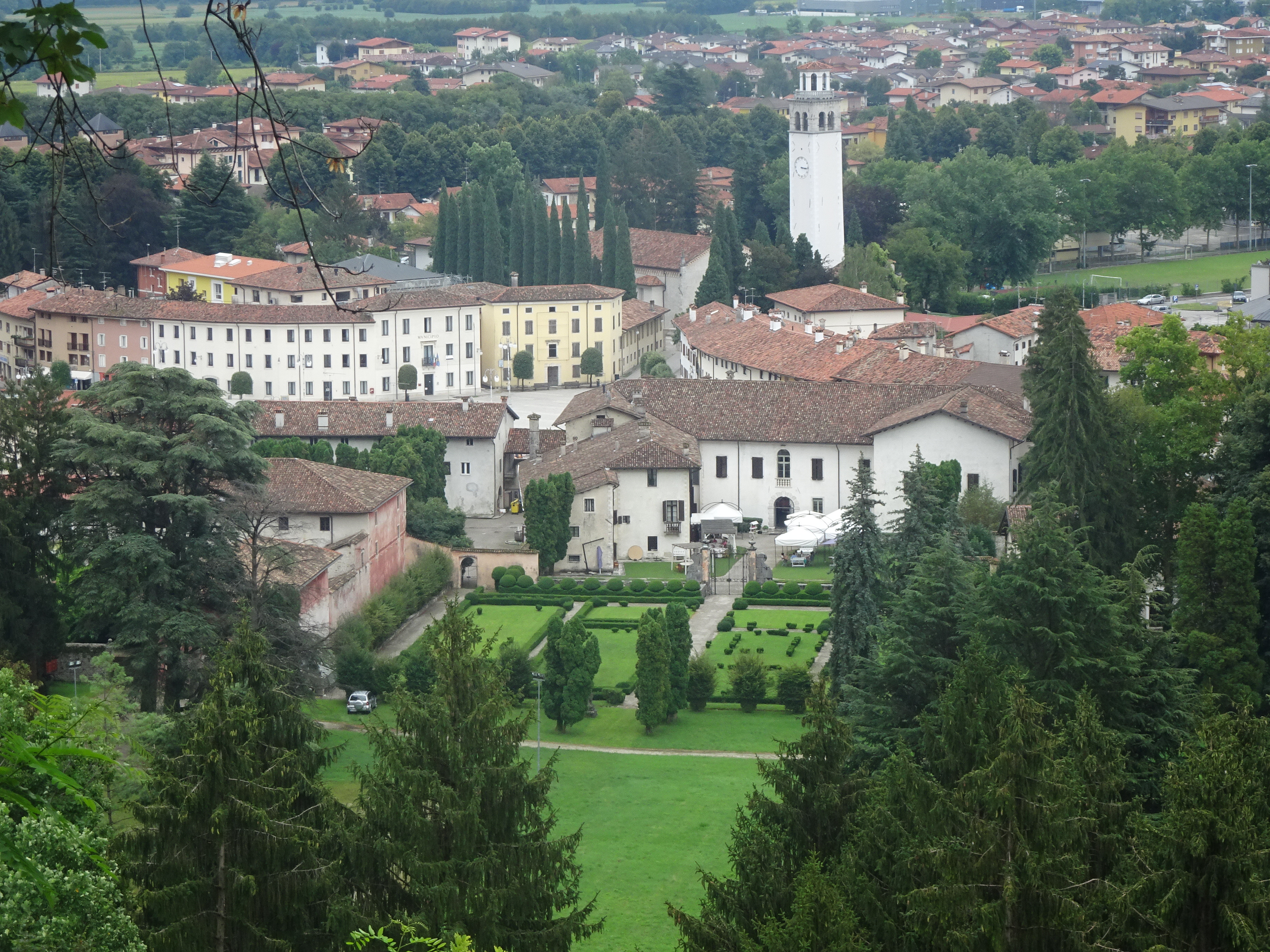

- Location within Italy Location within Friuli-Venezia Giulia
- Coordinates: 46°10′N 12°43′E
- Country: Italy
- Region: Friuli-Venezia Giulia
- Frazioni: Campagna, Dandolo, Maniagolibero, Fratta

Area
  - Total: 69 km^{2} (27 sq mi)
- Elevation: 283 m (928 ft)

Population (1 January 2013)
  - Total: 11,830
  - Density: 170/km^{2} (440/sq mi)
- Demonym: Maniaghesi
- Time zone: UTC+1 (CET)
  - Summer (DST): UTC+2 (CEST)
- Postal code: 33085
- Dialing code: 0427
- Patron saint: San Mauro di Parenzo
- Saint day: 9 November
- Website: Official website

Maniago (Friulian: Manià) is a town and comune (municipality) in the Regional decentralization entity of Pordenone, in the Friuli subregion of Friuli-Venezia Giulia, north-eastern Italy. It is known principally today for production of steel blades used by producers of knives, scissors, and shears, exported worldwide.

== People ==
- Antonio Centa
- Gian Antonio Selva
