= List of units of the Italian Army =

Coat of Arms of the Italian Army

This page lists brigades, regiments, battalions, and other formations and units of the Italian Army since World War II grouped by their administrative corps. Units grouped under their operational headquarters are listed at Structure of the Italian Army.

The units are listed by order of precedence. After the unit's name, the date of foundation i.e. *1624 and the location it is currently based follows. Disbanded units follow below the active units.

== Infantry Corps ==
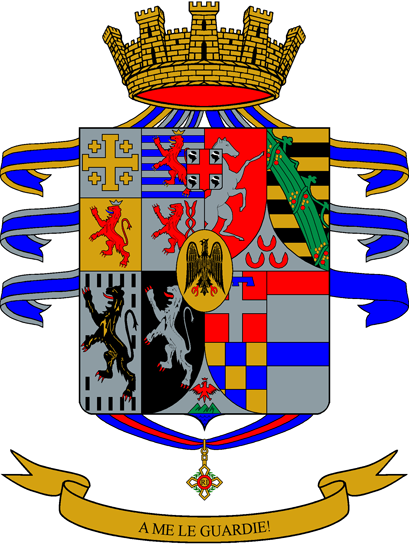
Coat of Arms 1st Granatieri Regiment

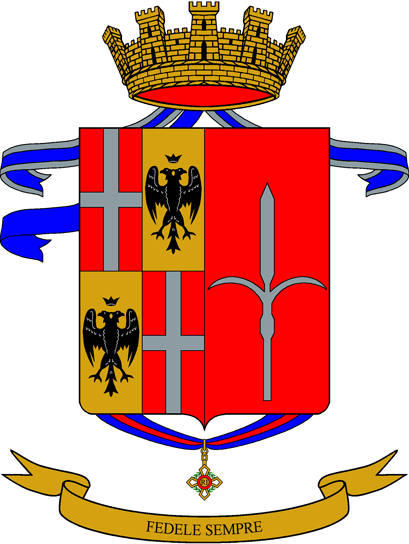
Coat of Arms 1st Infantry Regiment

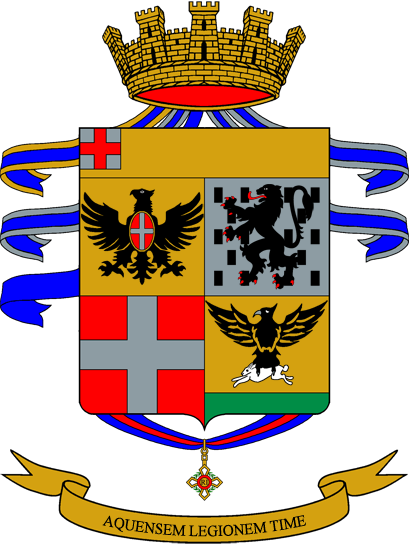
Coat of Arms 17th Infantry Regiment

=== Granatieri ===
==== History ====
The Granatieri (Grenadiers) are the oldest speciality of the Italian Army and act as honor guard for the President of Italy. In 1975 the Granatieri battalions, with the exception of the 3rd Battalion, were named for battles in which the Granatieri had distinguished themselves. The 3rd Battalion was named for the oldest regiment of their line.

==== Active units ====
- Mechanized Brigade "Granatieri di Sardegna", *1976-
  - Infantry Division "Granatieri di Sardegna", *1948-1976
    - 21st Infantry Division "Granatieri di Sardegna", *1934-1943
      - "Granatieri di Sardegna" Brigade, *1831-1939
- 1st Regiment "Granatieri di Sardegna", *1659-1943,1946-1976, 1992- (Rome)
  - 1st Mechanized Granatieri Battalion "Assietta", *1976-1992
- 2nd Regiment "Granatieri di Sardegna", *1744-1943, 1992–2002, 2022-
  - 2nd Mechanized Granatieri Battalion "Cengio", *1976-1992, 2017-2022
- 3rd Granatieri Command and Tactical Supports Unit "Guardie", *2022 (Rome)
  - 3rd Regiment "Granatieri Guardie", 1992-2002
    - 3rd Granatieri Battalion "Guardie", *1976-1992
      - 3rd Regiment "Granatieri di Sardegna", *1926-1943

=== Fanteria (Line Infantry) ===
==== Active units ====
Italian Infantry units are named for regions and cities. However the 5th, 13th, 17th, 20th, 21st, 60th, 66th, 67th, 87th, 114th, 120th, and 151st infantry battalions are named for battles, while the 52nd is named for the Alps and the 1st carries the name of Saint Justus of Trieste.

- Division "Acqui", *1831 (San Giorgio a Cremano)
- Mechanized Brigade "Aosta", *1831 (Messina)
- Mechanized Brigade "Pinerolo", *1831 (Bari)
- Airmobile Brigade "Friuli", *1884-1926, 1960- (Gorizia)
- Mechanized Brigade "Sassari", *1915 (Sassari)
- Infantry School, *1849 (Cesano)
- 5th Infantry Regiment "Aosta", *1690 (Messina)
  - 5th Motorized Infantry Battalion "Col della Berretta", *1975-1992
- 6th Command and Tactical Supports Unit "Aosta", *2022 (Messina)
  - 6th Infantry Regiment "Aosta", *1690-1955
- 9th Infantry Regiment "Bari", *1734 (Bari)
- 13th Command and Tactical Supports Unit "Pinerolo", *2022 (Bari)
  - 13th Infantry Regiment "Pinerolo", *1672-1990
    - 13th Motorized Infantry Battalion "Valbella", *1975-1990
- 17th Volunteer Training Regiment "Acqui", *1703 (Capua)
  - 17th Infantry Battalion "San Martino", *1975-1992
- 28th Regiment "Pavia", *1860 (Pesaro)
- 45th Command and Tactical Supports Unit "Reggio", *2022 (Sassari)
  - 45th Infantry Battalion "Arborea", *1977-1993
    - 45th Infantry Regiment "Reggio", *1859-2003
- 57th Command and Tactical Supports Unit "Abruzzi", *1861 (Capua)
  - 57th Infantry Regiment "Abruzzi", *1861-2013
- 62nd Infantry Regiment "Sicilia", *1861 (Catania)
- 66th Airmobile Infantry Regiment "Trieste", *1862 (Forlì)
  - 66th Mechanized Infantry Battalion "Valtellina", *1975-1993
- 78th Command and Tactical Supports Unit "Lupi di Toscana", *2022 (Florence)
  - 78th Infantry Regiment "Lupi di Toscana", *1862-2008
- 80th Regiment "Roma", *1889 (Monte Romano)
- 82nd Infantry Regiment "Torino", *1884 (Barletta)
- 85th Volunteer Training Regiment "Verona", *1884 (Verona)
- 87th Command and Tactical Supports Unit "Friuli", *2022 (Bologna)
  - 87th Infantry Regiment "Friuli", *1884-1991
    - 87th Motorized Infantry Battalion "Senio", *1975-1991
- 151st Infantry Regiment "Sassari", *1915 (Cagliari)
  - 151st Infantry Battalion "Sette Comuni", *1976-1992
- 152nd Infantry Regiment "Sassari", *1915 (Sassari)
- 235th Volunteer Training Regiment "Piceno", *1917 (Ascoli Piceno)

==== Inactive units ====
Inactivated units of the Infantry of the Line:

- Division "Friuli", *1884-2019
- Division "Mantova", *1942-2013
- Mechanized Division "Folgore", *1944-1986
- Motorized Brigade "Acqui", *1859-1926, 1975-1996
- Infantry Brigade "Avellino", *1949-1965
- Mechanized Brigade "Brescia", *1859–1939, 1975-1991
- Motorized Brigade "Cremona", *1859-1926, 1975-1996
- Mechanized Brigade "Gorizia", *1975-1996
- Mechanized Brigade "Legnano", *1975-1997
- Mechanized Brigade "Isonzo", *1975-1986
- Mechanized Brigade "Mantova", *1915-1919, 1986-1997
- Mechanized Brigade "Trieste", *1960-1991
- 1st Infantry Regiment "San Giusto", *1624-2008
- 4th Infantry Regiment "Piemonte", *1636-1943
  - 4th Infantry Battalion "Guastalla", *1977-1991
- 7th Infantry Regiment "Cuneo", *1701-2001
- 11th Infantry Regiment "Casale", *1619-1999
- 16th Infantry Regiment "Savona", *1815-1991
- 20th Infantry Regiment "Brescia", *1848-1991
  - 20th Mechanized Infantry Battalion "Monte San Michele", *1975-1991
- 21st Infantry Regiment "Cremona", *1848-2003
  - 21st Motorized Infantry Battalion "Alfonsine", *1975-1993
- 22nd Infantry Regiment "Cremona", *1848-1990
  - 22nd Infantry Battalion "Primaro", *1975-1990
- 23rd Infantry Regiment "Como", *1848-1996
- 26th Infantry Regiment "Bergamo", *1859-1999
- 30th Infantry Regiment "Pisa", *1859-1991
- 33rd Infantry Regiment "Livorno", *1859-1943
  - 33rd Infantry Fortification Battalion "Ardenza", *1975-1991
- 37th Infantry Regiment "Ravenna", *1859-1991
- 40th Infantry Regiment "Bologna", *1859-1991
- 41st Infantry Regiment "Modena", *1859-1995
- 46th Infantry Regiment "Reggio", *1859-1978
- 47th Infantry Regiment "Ferrara", *1859-2015
  - 47th Infantry Battalion "Salento", *1977-1997
- 48th Infantry Regiment "Ferrara", *1859-1991
- 52nd Infantry Regiment "Alpi", *1859-1943, 1958-1975
- 53rd Infantry Regiment "Umbria", *1975-1996
- 59th Infantry Regiment "Calabria", *1861-1991
- 60th Infantry Regiment "Calabria", *1861-2005
  - 60th Infantry Battalion "Col di Lana", *1975-2005
- 63rd Infantry Regiment "Cagliari", *1862-1991
- 67th Infantry Regiment "Legnano", *1862-1995
  - 67th Mechanized Infantry Battalion "Montelungo", *1975-1993
- 68th Infantry Regiment "Legnano", *1862-1989
  - 68th Mechanized Infantry Battalion "Palermo", *1975-1989
- 72nd Infantry Battalion "Puglie", *1862-1999
- 73rd Infantry Regiment "Lombardia", *1859-1986
- 75th Infantry Regiment "Napoli", *1861-1958
- 76th Infantry Regiment "Napoli", *1861-1997
- 84th Infantry Regiment "Venezia", *1884-2000
- 89th Infantry Regiment "Salerno", *1884-1991
- 91st Infantry Regiment "Basilicata", *1884-1943
  - 91st Infantry Battalion "Lucania", *1977-2009
- 92nd Infantry Regiment "Basilicata", *1884-1996
- 114th Infantry Regiment "Mantova", *1915-1995
  - 114th Mechanized Infantry Battalion "Moriago", *1975-??
- 120th Infantry Regiment "Emilia", *1915-1991
  - 120th Infantry Fortification Battalion "Fornovo", *1975-1991
- 121st Infantry Regiment "Macerata", *1915-2000
- 123rd Infantry Battalion "Chieti", *1985-2012
- 130th Infantry Regiment "Perugia", *1915-1996
- 141st Infantry Regiment "Catanzaro", *1915-1995
- 157th Infantry Regiment "Liguria", *1915-2004
- 225th Infantry Regiment "Arezzo", *1916-1999
- 231st Infantry Regiment "Avellino", *1916-2004
- 244th Infantry Regiment "Cosenza", *1917-1992

=== Bersaglieri ===
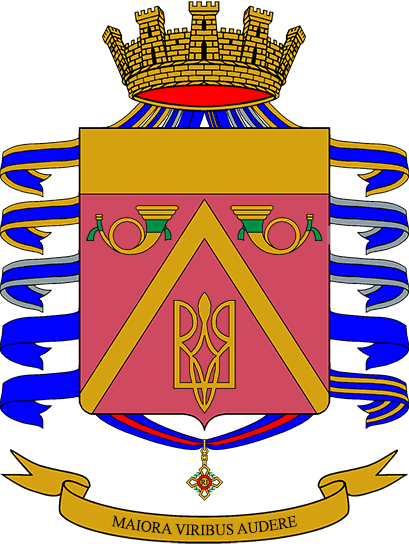
Coat of Arms 3rd Bersaglieri Regiment

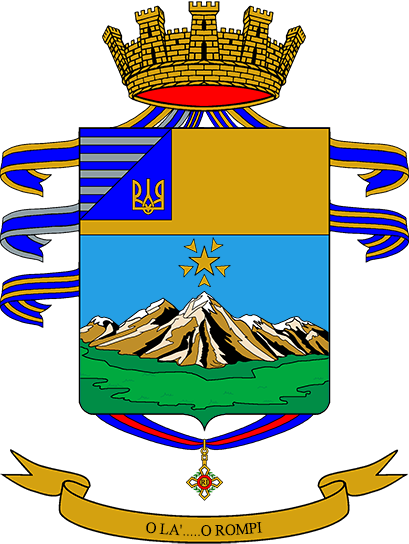
Coat of Arms 8th Alpini Regiment

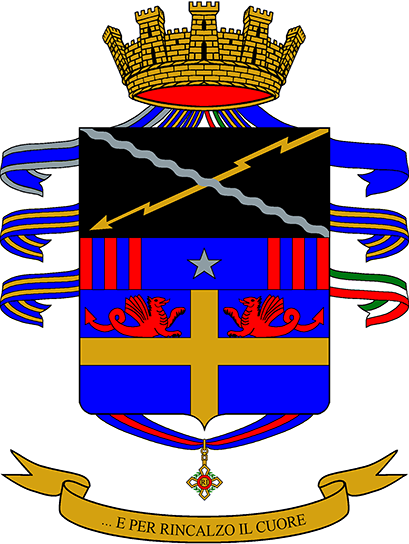
Coat of Arms 183rd Paratroopers Regiment

==== History ====
Originally raised as sharpshooters and skirmishers, the Bersaglieri serve since World War II mostly as mechanized infantry. In 1975 the Bersaglieri battalions, with the exception of the 1st and 11th battalion, were named for battles in which the Bersaglieri had distinguished themselves. The 1st Bersaglieri Battalion is named for the founder of the Bersaglieri corps General Alessandro Ferrero La Marmora, while the 11th Battalion, which had received the war flag of the 182nd Regiment "Garibaldi", was named for the island of Caprera where Italy's national hero Giuseppe Garibaldi spent the last years of his life.

==== Active units ====
- Bersaglieri Brigade "Garibaldi", *1975- (Caserta)
- 1st Bersaglieri Regiment, *1861-1943, 1953–1976, 1995- (Cosenza)
  - 1st Bersaglieri Battalion "La Marmora", *1976-1995
- 3rd Bersaglieri Regiment, *1861-1943, 1946–1975, 1991- (Teulada)
  - 18th Bersaglieri Battalion "Poggio Scanno", *1975-1991
- 4th Bersaglieri Command and Tactical Supports Unit, *2022 (Caserta)
  - 4th Bersaglieri Regiment, *1861-1944
    - 26th Bersaglieri Battalion "Castelfidardo", *1975-1998
- 6th Bersaglieri Regiment, *1861-1865, 1871–1943, 1992- (Trapani)
  - 6th Bersaglieri Battalion "Palestro", *1975-1989
- 7th Bersaglieri Regiment, *1871-1943, 1992- (Altamura)
  - 10th Bersaglieri Battalion "Bezzecca", *1975-1992
- 8th Bersaglieri Regiment, *1871-1943, 1949-1975, 1993- (Caserta)
  - 3rd Bersaglieri Battalion "Cernaia", *1975-1993
- 11th Bersaglieri Regiment, *1883-1943, 1992- (Orcenico Superiore), in 1992 the 27th Bersaglieri Battalion "Jamiano" joined the regiment, which was replaced by the 11th Bersaglieri Battalion "Caprera" in 1997
  - 11th Bersaglieri Battalion "Caprera", *1975-1997

==== Inactive units ====
Inactivated units of the Bersaglieri specialty:

- Mechanized Brigade "Goito", *1975-1991
- 2nd Bersaglieri Regiment, *1861-1943, 1992-2001
  - 2nd Bersaglieri Battalion "Governolo", *1975-1992
- 5th Bersaglieri Regiment, *1861-1943
  - 14th Bersaglieri Battalion "Sernaglia", *1977-1989
- 9th Bersaglieri Regiment, *1871-1942
  - 28th Bersaglieri Battalion "Oslavia", *1975-1996
- 12th Bersaglieri Regiment, *1883-1942, 1992-2005
  - 23rd Bersaglieri Battalion "Castel di Borgo", *1975-1992
- 18th Bersaglieri Regiment, *1917-1919, 1935-1936, 1942-1943, 1993-2005
  - 67th Bersaglieri Battalion "Fagare", *1975-1993
- 27th Bersaglieri Battalion "Jamiano", *1975-1992, joined the 11th Bersaglieri Regiment in 1992, was replaced by the 11th Bersaglieri Battalion "Caprera" in 1997 and then inactivated

=== Alpini ===
==== History ====
Alpini are the Italian Army's mountain infantry units. Since their founding in 1872 the battalions of the Alpini were named for the Alpine villages and cities were the battalions had their depot. First line reserve battalions were named after the valleys (Val) surrounding the locations of the depots, and second line reserve battalions were named for mountains (Monte) located within the valleys surrounding the locations of the depots.

==== Active units ====
In 1975 all regiments were disbanded and their flags passed to the newly independent battalions. Beginning in the early 1990s the regiments were reactivated and the battalions, upon entering a regiment, returned the flags to the regiments and lost their independence.

- Division "Tridentina", *2002- (Bolzano)
  - Alpine Brigade "Tridentina", *1951-2002
    - 2nd Alpine Division "Tridentina", *1934-1943
      - 2nd Alpine Brigade, *1923-1934
- Alpine Brigade "Taurinense", *1952- (Turin)
  - 1st Alpine Division "Taurinense", *1934-1943
    - 1st Alpine Brigade, *1923-1934
- Alpine Brigade "Julia", *1949- (Udine)
  - 3rd Alpine Division "Julia", *1934-1943
    - 3rd Alpine Brigade, *1923-1934
- Alpine Training Center, *1934-1943, 1948- (Aosta)
  - Alpini Battalion "Aosta", *1886-1943, 1946-1989, received the flag of the 4th Alpini Regiment in 1975. Became a support unit of the Alpine Training Center in 1989.
- 1st Alpini Command and Tactical Supports Unit, *2022 (Turin)
  - 1st Alpini Regiment, *1882-1943
    - Alpini Battalion "Mondovì", *1886-1943, 1950-1997
- 2nd Alpini Regiment, *1882-1943, 1963-74, 1992- (Cuneo)
  - Alpini Battalion "Saluzzo", *1904-1943, 1945-1964, 1968-1992
- 3rd Alpini Regiment, *1882-1917, 1920-1944, 1993- (Pinerolo)
  - Alpini Battalion "Susa", *1886-1943, 1945-1993
- 4th Alpini Paratroopers Regiment, *1882-1943, 1946-1975, 2004- (Verona)
  - Alpini Battalion "Monte Cervino", *1915-1919, 1940-1941, 1942-1943, 1996-2004, received the flag of the 4th Alpini Regiment in 1996.
- 5th Alpini Regiment, *1882-1943, 1953-1975, 1992- (Sterzing)
  - Alpini Battalion "Morbegno", *1886-1943, 1956-1992
- 6th Alpini Regiment, *1882-1943, 1946-1975, 1993- (Innichen)
  - Alpini Battalion "Bassano", *1886-1943, 1951-1993
- 7th Alpini Regiment, *1887-1943, 1953-1975, 1992- (Belluno)
  - Alpini Battalion "Feltre", *1886-1943, 1956-1992
- 8th Alpini Regiment, *1909-1943, 1946-1975, 1992- (Cividale)
  - Alpini Battalion "Tolmezzo", *1908-1943, 1946- (joined the regiment in 2005)
- 9th Alpini Regiment, *1921-1943, 1991-(L'Aquila)
  - Alpini Battalion "L'Aquila", *1935-1943, 1944-1991
    - Alpini Battalion "Monte Berico", *1915-1919
  - Alpini Battalion "Vicenza", *1886-1943, 1975–1996, 2017-
- 14th Alpini Command and Tactical Supports Unit, *2022 (Udine)
  - 14th Alpini Regiment, *1993-2005 raised from the "Tolmezzo" battalion in 1993. The battalion was transferred to the 8th Alpini Regiment in 2005 and the 14th was inactivated.

==== Inactive units ====
Inactivated units of the Alpini specialty:

- Alpine Brigade "Cadore", *1953-1997
- Alpine Brigade "Orobica", *1953-1991
- 11th Alpini Regiment, *1935-1943, 1992-2002
  - Alpini Battalion "Trento", *1918-1943, 1946-2002
- 12th Alpini Regiment, *1936-1937, 1992-1997
  - Alpini Battalion "Pieve di Cadore", *1886-1943, 1953-1997
- 15th Alpini Regiment, *1992-1995
  - Alpini Battalion "Cividale", *1909-1943, 1948-1995
- 16th Regiment "Belluno", *1991-2004
  - Alpini Battalion "Belluno", *1910-1917, 1919–1943, 1953-2004
- 18th Regiment "Edolo", *1997-2004
  - Alpini Battalion "Edolo", *1886-1943, 1945-2004
- Alpini Battalion "Gemona", *1886-1943, 1956–2005, received the flag of the 8th Alpini Regiment in 1975, re-entered the 8th Alpini Regiment in 1992, was replaced by the Alpini Battalion "Tolmezzo" in 2005
- Alpini Battalion "Tirano", *1886-1943, 1953-1991
- Alpini Battalion "Bolzano", *1937-1943, 1949-1975

Alpini Fortification (Alpini d'Arresto) battalions were tasked with manning the fortifications of the Vallo Alpino and received the names of 1st line reserve battalions of World War I. The three Alpini fortification groupings were regimental-level, administrative formation.

- 11th Alpini Fortification Grouping, *1952-1975
  - Alpini Battalion "Val Tagliamento", *1915-1918, 1939–1943, 1963-1992
  - Alpini Battalion "Val Fella", *1915-1917, 1939–1943, 1963-1975
  - Alpini Battalion "Val Natisone", *1915-1918, 1939–1943, 1963-1964
- 21st Alpini Fortification Grouping, *1952-1964
  - Alpini Battalion "Val Brenta", *1915-1919, 1939–1940, 1964-1986
  - Alpini Battalion "Val Leogra", *1915-1917, 1939–1943, 1963-1964
- 22nd Alpini Fortification Grouping, *1952-1962
  - Alpini Battalion "Val Chiese", *1915-1919, 1939–1943, 1963-1979
- Alpini Battalion "Val Cismon", *1915-1919, 1939–1943, 1963-1975

=== Paracadutisti ===
==== History ====
Paracadutisti (Paratroopers) are the Italian Army's airborne forces. In 1975 Paracadutisti battalions, with the exception of the 2nd Battalion, were named for battles in which the Paracadutisti had distinguished themselves. The 2nd Battalion was named after the location of the first Italian Paratroopers school. Paratroopers regiments carry the name of World War II airborne divisions.

==== Active units ====
- Paratroopers Brigade "Folgore", *1963- (Livorno)
  - 185th Infantry Division "Folgore", *1941-1942
- Paratroopers Training Center, *1939-43, 1947- (Pisa)
- 9th Paratroopers Assault Regiment "Col Moschin", *1918-1919, 1944–1945, 1995- (Livorno)
  - 9th Paratroopers Assault Battalion "Col Moschin", *1961-1995
- 183rd Paratroopers Regiment "Nembo", *1993- (Pistoia)
  - 183rd Paratroopers Battalion "Nembo", *1991-1993, entered the 183rd Paratroopers Regiment "Nembo" in 1993 as 1st Paratroopers Battalion "Grizzano"
    - 183rd Mechanized Infantry Battalion "Nembo", *1975-1991
      - 183rd Infantry Regiment "Nembo", *1948-1975
        - Paratroopers Regiment "Nembo", *1944-1948
          - 183rd Paratroopers Infantry Regiment "Nembo", *1943-1944
- 184th Paratroopers Command and Tactical Supports Unit "Nembo", *2022 (Livorno)
  - 184th Paratroopers Infantry Regiment "Nembo", *1942-1944, merged into the Paratroopers Regiment "Nembo"
- 185th Paratroopers Reconnaissance Target Acquisition Regiment "Folgore", *1942-1945, 2013- (Livorno)
  - 3rd Paratroopers Battalion "Poggio Rusco", *1975-1998, the flag of the battalion was given to the 185th Paratroopers Reconnaissance Target Acquisition Regiment in 2013, when the regiment had to transfers its flag to the reactivated 185th Paratroopers Artillery Regiment "Folgore"
    - 1st Paratroopers Regiment, *1963-1975
      - 1st Paratroopers Infantry Regiment, *1941-1942
- 186th Paratroopers Regiment "Folgore", *1942, 1992- (Siena)
  - 5th Paratroopers Battalion "El Alamein", *1975-1992
    - V Paratroopers Battalion, *1963-1975
      - 2nd Paratroopers Infantry Regiment, *1941-1942
- 187th Paratroopers Regiment "Folgore", *1942, 1992- (Livorno)
  - 2nd Paratroopers Battalion "Tarquinia", *1975-1992
    - II Paratroopers Battalion, *1963-1975
      - 3rd Paratroopers Infantry Regiment, *1941-1942

=== Lagunari ===
Lagunari are the Italian Army's amphibious forces. In 1975 the two Lagunari battalions were named for the honorary name of Republic of Venice and for the Sile river, which flows into the Venetian lagoon and was the location of heavy combat between Austro-Hungarian and Italian forces in 1918.

==== Active units ====
- Lagunari Regiment "Serenissima", *1951-1975, 1992- (Venice-Lido)
  - 1st Lagunari Battalion "Serenissima", *1975-1992

==== Inactive units ====
- Amphibious Battalion "Sile", *1975-1992 (Venice-Sant'Andrea)

== Cavalry Corps ==
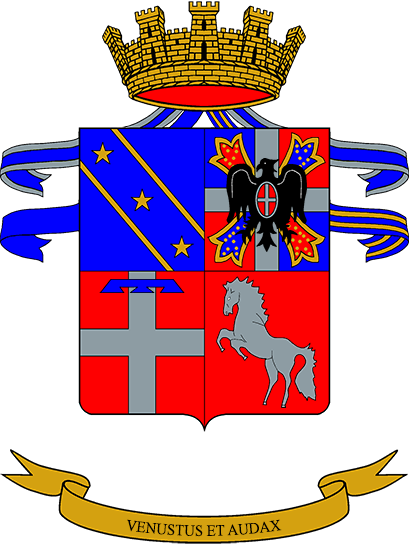
Coat of Arms 2nd Cavalry Regiment

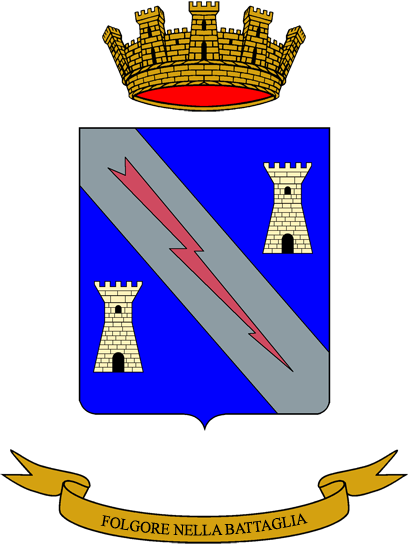
Coat of Arms 1st Tank Regiment

=== Cavalleria di Linea (Cavalry of the Line) ===
==== History ====
The ten oldest cavalry regiments were named for territories of the Savoyard state, while later units were named for Italian cities. The two exceptions to this rule are the 8th Regiment named for the Battle of Montebello and the 19th Regiment, which retained its title as Guides. The following lists includes the origin of the name for the oldest regiments in brackets before the date of founding. The first four regiments are Dragoons, with the rest of the regiments either being Lancers (Lancieri) or Chevau-légers (Cavalleggeri).

Italian Army cavalry regiments are the army's only units, which have the name before their number, and who do not include a description of the type of unit in their name (unlike other regiments like i.e. 5th Alpini Regiment, 2nd Engineer Regiment, 32nd Tank Regiment, etc.)

- Dragoons:
  - Regiment "Nizza Cavalleria" (1st)
  - Regiment "Piemonte Cavalleria" (2nd)
  - Regiment "Savoia Cavalleria" (3rd)
  - Regiment "Genova Cavalleria" (4th)
- Lancers:
  - Regiment "Lancieri di Novara" (5th)
  - Regiment "Lancieri di Aosta" (6th)
  - Regiment "Lancieri di Montebello" (8th)
- Chevau-légers:
  - Regiment "Cavalleggeri di Lodi" (15th)
  - Regiment "Cavalleggeri Guide" (19th)

==== Active units ====
- Multinational Division South, *2025 (Florence)
  - Division "Vittorio Veneto", *2019-2025 (Florence)
    - Armored Brigade "Vittorio Veneto", *1975-1991
- Cavalry Brigade "Pozzuolo del Friuli", 1957- (Gorizia)
  - Fast Brigade "Emanuele Filiberto Testa di Ferro" (II), *1935-1938
    - II Cavalry Brigade, *1835-1849, 1859–1863, 1866, 1870-1935
- Cavalry School, *1823-1943, 1946- (Lecce)
- Regiment "Nizza Cavalleria" (1st) (County of Nice), *1690-1799, 1815–1943, 1946- (Bellinzago Novarese)
- Regiment "Piemonte Cavalleria" (2nd) (Principality of Piedmont), *1692-1799, 1815–1943, 1946- (Trieste)
- Regiment "Savoia Cavalleria" (3rd) (Duchy of Savoy), *1692-1798, 1815–1943, 1946- (Grosseto)
- Regiment "Genova Cavalleria" (4th) (Genevois province, later Duchy of Genoa), *1683-1799, 1815–1943, 1946- (Palmanova)
- Regiment "Lancieri di Novara" (5th), *1828-1943, 1946- (Codroipo)
- Regiment "Lancieri di Aosta" (6th) (Duchy of Aosta), *1774-1796, 1831–1943, 19451- (Palermo)
- Regiment "Lancieri di Montebello" (8th), *1859-1943, 1950- (Rome)
- Regiment "Cavalleggeri di Lodi" (15th), *1859-1920, 1942–1943, 1952–1995, 2020- (Lecce)
- Regiment "Cavalleggeri Guide" (19th), *1859-1945, 1949- (Salerno)
- Command and Tactical Supports Unit "Cavalleggeri di Treviso" (28th), *2022 (Gorizia)
  - Regiment "Cavalleggeri di Treviso" (28th), *1909-1919, 1975-1991

==== Inactive units ====
The Regiment "Lancieri di Firenze" (9th) was originally a unit of the Grand Duchy of Tuscany and became the only cavalry regiment of the conquered Italian states, which was allowed to join the Royal Sardinian Army. The inactivated units of the cavalry are:

- Regiment "Lancieri di Milano" (7th), *1859-1920, 1938–1943, 1964-1989
- Regiment "Lancieri di Firenze" (9th), *1859-1943, 1951–1957, 1975-1995
  - Corpo Dragoni Toscani, *1753-1808, 1814-1859
- Regiment "Lancieri Vittorio Emanuele II" (10th), *1859-1943
- Regiment "Cavalleggeri di Saluzzo" (12th), (Marquisate of Saluzzo) *1848-1943, 1964-1991
- Regiment "Cavalleggeri di Monferrato" (13th), *1850-1943
- Regiment "Cavalleggeri di Alessandria" (14th), *1850-1943
  - 1964-1979: "Cavalleggeri di Alessandria" Reconnaissance Squadron
- Regiment "Cavalleggeri di Lucca" (16th), * 1859–1920, 1943

=== Carristi (Tankers) ===
==== History ====
Originally the tank corps was a speciality of the infantry and named "Fanteria carrista" (Tank infantry). On 1 June 1999 the tank corps left the infantry and became part of the cavalry. In 1975 tank battalions were named for officers, soldiers and partisans, who were posthumously awarded Italy's highest military honor the Gold Medal of Military Valor for heroism during World War II.

==== Active units ====
- 132nd Armored Brigade "Ariete", *1986- (Pordenone)
  - Armored Division "Ariete", *1948-1986
    - 132nd Armored Division "Ariete", *1937-1943
- 1st Armored Regiment, *1936-1943, 1948–1949, 1959- (Teulada)
- 4th Tank Regiment, *1936-1943, 1953–1975, 1992- (Persano)
  - 20th Tank Battalion "M.O. Pentimalli", *1975-1991
- 7th Tank Command and Tactical Supports Unit "M.O. Di Dio", *2022 (Pordenone)
  - 7th Tank Battalion "M.O. Di Dio", *1975-1991
    - VII Tank Battalion, *1941-1942, 1949-1975
- 32nd Tank Regiment, *1936-1944, 1964–1975, 1992- (Tauriano)
  - 3rd Tank Battalion "M.O. Galas", *1975-1992
- 132nd Tank Regiment, *1941-1942, 1944, 1948–1975, 1992- (Cordenons)
  - 8th Tank Battalion "M.O. Secchiaroli", *1975-1992

==== Inactive units ====
- Armored Brigade "Centauro", *1986-2002
  - Armored Division "Centauro", *1951-1986
    - 131st Armored Division "Centauro", *1936-1943
- 31st Armored Brigade "Curtatone", *1975-1986 renamed Armored Brigade "Centauro" in 1986
- 32nd Armored Brigade "Mameli", *1975-1991
- 132nd Armored Brigade "Manin", *1975-1986 renamed Armored Brigade "Ariete" in 1986
- 2nd Tank Regiment, *1991-1995
  - 22nd Tank Battalion "M.O. Piccinini", *1975-1991
- 3rd Armored Infantry Regiment, *1927-1943, 1964-1975
  - 9th Armored Battalion "M.O. Butera", *1975-1995
- 31st Tank Regiment, *1937-1943, 1951–1975, 1993-2020
  - 1st Tank Battalion "M.O. Cracco", *1975-1993
- 33rd Tank Regiment, *1939-1943, 1993-2001
  - 6th Tank Battalion "M.O. Scapuzzi", *1976-1993
  - 11th Tank Battalion "M.O. Calzecchi", *1976-2001
    - XI Tank Battalion, *1941-1942, 1960-1975
- 60th Tank Regiment "M.O. Locatelli", *1991-1992
  - 60th Tank Battalion "M.O. Locatelli", *1975-1991
    - LX Tank Battalion, *1940-1941, 1960-1975
- 63rd Tank Regiment, *1991-1995
  - 63rd Tank Battalion "M.O. Fioritto", *1975-1991
    - LXIII Tank Battalion, *1939-1941, 1958-1975
- 131st Tank Regiment, *1941-1942, 1993-2013
  - 101st Tank Battalion "M.O. Zappalà", *1975-1993
- 133rd Tank Regiment, *1941-1942, 1992-1995
  - 10th Tank Battalion "M.O. Bruno", *1975-1991
- 4th Tank Battalion "M.O. Passalacqua", *1975-1992
  - IV Tank Battalion, *1940-1942, 1959-1975
- 5th Tank Battalion "M.O. Chiamenti", *1975-1992
  - V Tank Battalion, *1940-1941, 1964-1975
- 13th Tank Battalion "M.O. Pascucci", *1975-1989
  - XIII Tank Battalion, *1941-1942, 1961-1975
- 19th Armored Battalion "M.O. Tumiati", *1975-1991
  - XIX Armored Battalion, *1941-1943, 1960-1975
- 31st Tank Battalion "M.O. Andreani", *1982-1993
  - Armored Battalion (of the Armored Troops School), *1975-1982
- 62nd Armored Battalion "M.O. Jero", *1975-1992
  - LXII Armored Battalion, *1940-1941, 1960-1975

== Artillery Corps ==
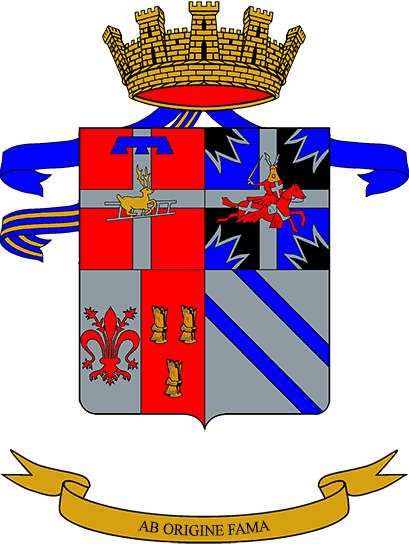
Coat of Arms 5th Artillery Regiment

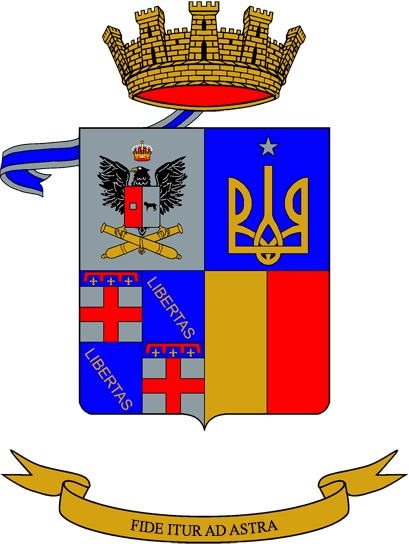
Coat of Arms 121st Air-Defense Regiment

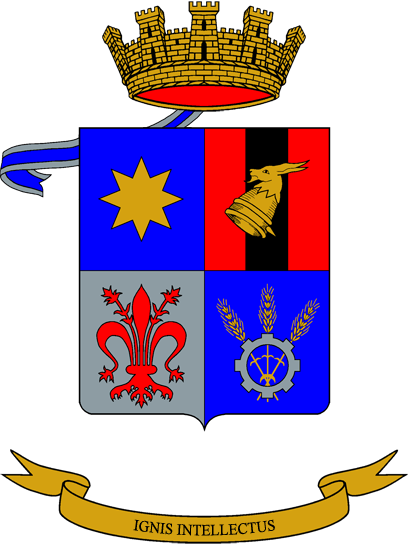
Coat of Arms 41st ISTAR Regiment

=== Artiglieria Terrestre (Field Artillery) ===
==== Active units ====
Each Field Artillery regiment consists of a HQ platoon, a target acquisition battery, a logistic support battery and an artillery group with a command platoon and three firing batteries 6x artillery systems each.

===== Field Artillery =====
- Artillery Command, *??? (Bracciano)
- Field Artillery Regiment "a Cavallo" (Horse Artillery), *1831 (Milan)
- 1st Field Artillery Regiment (Mountain), *1887 (Fossano)
  - Mountain Artillery Group "Aosta", *1910-1992
- 3rd Field Artillery Regiment (Mountain), *1902 (Tolmezzo)
  - Mountain Artillery Group "Conegliano", *1909-1992
- 5th Field Artillery Regiment "Superga", *1850 (Portogruaro)
  - 5th Heavy Field Artillery Group "Superga", *1976-1991
- 8th Field Artillery Regiment "Pasubio", *1696 (Persano)
  - 8th Self-propelled Field Artillery Group "Pasubio", *1975-1992
- 21st Field Artillery Regiment "Trieste", *1888 (Foggia)
  - 21st Field Artillery Group "Romagna", *1975-1993
- 24th Field Artillery Regiment "Peloritani", *1888 (Messina)
  - 24th Field Artillery Group "Peloritani", *1975-1992
- 52nd Field Artillery Regiment "Torino", *1916 (Vercelli)
  - 52nd Field Artillery Group "Venaria", *1975-1992
- 132nd Field Artillery Regiment "Ariete", *1939 (Maniago)
  - 132nd Heavy Field Artillery Group "Rovereto", in Casarsa della Delizia, *1975-1993
- 185th Paratroopers Artillery Regiment "Folgore", *1941 (Bracciano)
  - 185th Paratroopers Field Artillery Group "Viterbo", *1975-1992

===== Heavy Field Artillery =====
- 3rd Targeting Support Regiment "Bondone", *2023 (Cassino)
  - 3rd Artillery Specialists Group "Bondone", *1986-1992
    - 4th Artillery Specialists Group "Bondone", *1976-1986
      - 3rd Heavy Field Artillery Regiment, *1920-1976

==== Inactive units ====
===== Field Artillery =====
- 3rd Missile Brigade "Aquileia", *1959-1991
- 1st Artillery Group "Cacciatori delle Alpi", *1976-1999
- 3rd Self-propelled Field Artillery Group "Pastrengo", *1975-1991
- 11th Field Artillery Regiment, *1884-1991
- 9th Self-propelled Field Artillery Group "Brennero", *1863-1992
- 10th Self-propelled Field Artillery Group "Avisio", *1939-1986
- 11th Field Artillery Group "Monferrato", *1975-1991
- 12th Self-propelled Field Artillery Group "Capua", *1884-1991
- 13th Artillery Regiment "Granatieri di Sardegna", *1888-1995
  - 13th Field Artillery Group "Magliana", *1975-1992
- 14th Field Artillery Group "Murge", *1888-30 June 1991
- 19th Self-propelled Field Artillery Group "Rialto", *1975-1993
- 20th Self-propelled Field Artillery Group "Piave", *???-March 1991
- 27th Heavy Self-propelled Artillery Regiment "Marche", *1912-1995
  - 27th Heavy Self-propelled Artillery Group "Marche", *1985-1992
- 28th Self-propelled Field Artillery Group "Livorno", *1912-1995
- 33rd Field Artillery Regiment "Acqui", *1915-2013
  - 33rd Heavy Field Artillery Group "Terni", *1975-1993
- 35th Field Artillery Group "Riolo", 1915-1991
- 46th Self-propelled Field Artillery Group "Trento", *1975-1993
- 47th Field Artillery Group "Gargano", *1915-1981
- 48th Field Artillery Group "Taro", *1915-1995
- 108th Heavy Field Artillery Group "Cosseria", *1941-31 October 1986
- 120th Self-propelled Field Artillery Group "Po", *1942-1991
- 131st Self-propelled Field Artillery Regiment "Centauro", *1939-2001
  - 131st Heavy Field Artillery Group "Vercelli", *1975-1992
- 155th Heavy Field Artillery Group "Emilia", *1941-1992
- 184th Self-propelled Field Artillery Regiment "Nembo", *1942-1996
  - 184th Heavy Field Artillery Group "Filottrano", *1976-1993
- 205th Heavy Field Artillery Group "Lomellina", *1940-1991

===== Heavy Field Artillery =====
Corps level support units were designated as "Heavy Field Artillery" (previously: "Army Corps Artillery Regiment"):

- 2nd Self-propelled Field Artillery Regiment "Potenza", *1993-1995
  - 2nd Heavy Field Artillery Group "Potenza", *1976-1993
    - 2nd Heavy Field Artillery Regiment, *1926-1943
      - 6th Heavy Field Artillery Regiment, *1920-1926
- 4th Heavy Field Artillery Group "Pusteria", *1986-1992
  - 4th Heavy Field Artillery Regiment, *1920-1986
- 5th Artillery Specialists Group "Medea", *1986-1991
  - 5th Heavy Field Artillery Regiment, 1928-1943
- 6th Artillery Specialists Group "Montello", *1986-1991
  - 6th Heavy Field Artillery Regiment, 1926-1974
    - 2nd Heavy Field Artillery Regiment, 1912-1926
- 8th Anti-aircraft Artillery Regiment, *1992-1995
  - 8th Heavy Field Artillery Group "Marmore", *1986-1991
    - 8th Heavy Field Artillery Regiment, *1920-1986
- 9th Heavy Field Artillery Group "Foggia", *1975-1981, 1986-1991
  - 9th Heavy Field Artillery Regiment, *1920-1975, 1981-1986
- 11th Self-propelled Field Artillery Regiment "Teramo", *1992-2001
  - 11th Field Artillery Group "Teramo", *1976-1992
    - 11th Heavy Field Artillery Regiment, *1920-1926, 1939-1943
- 12th Artillery Specialists Group "Biella", *1986-1992
  - 12th Heavy Field Artillery Regiment, *1920-1943

===== Heavy Artillery =====
Army level support units were designated as "Heavy Artillery" (previously: "Army Artillery Regiment"):

- 1st Heavy Artillery Group "Adige", *1975-31 July 1983
  - 1st Heavy Artillery Regiment, *1902-1943
- 3rd Heavy Artillery Regiment "Volturno", *1992-2001
  - 3rd Missiles Artillery Group "Volturno", *1975-1992
    - 3rd Missiles Artillery Regiment, *1961-1975
      - 3rd Heavy Artillery Regiment, *1926-1961
- 9th Heavy Field Artillery Regiment "Rovigo", *1992-1995
  - 9th Heavy Artillery Group "Rovigo", *1975-1992
    - 9th Heavy Artillery Regiment, *1926-1973

===== Mountain Artillery =====
- 1st Mountain Artillery Regiment groups until 1975:
  - Mountain Artillery Group "Aosta", *1910-
  - Mountain Artillery Group "Susa", *???-1975
  - Mountain Artillery Group "Mondovì", *???-1975
- 2nd Mountain Artillery Regiment, *1909-2015
  - Mountain Artillery Group "Vicenza", *1909-1992
  - Mountain Artillery Group "Asiago", *1952-1991
  - Mountain Artillery Group "Verona", *1952-1975
- 3rd Mountain Artillery Regiment groups until 1975:
  - Mountain Artillery Group "Belluno", *1909-1989
  - Mountain Artillery Group "Conegliano", *1909-
  - Mountain Artillery Group "Udine", *1915-1995
  - Mountain Artillery Group "Pinerolo", *1926-1991
  - Mountain Artillery Group "Osoppo", *1961-1975
- 5th Mountain Artillery Regiment, *1935-2001
  - Mountain Artillery Group "Bergamo", *1910-1992
  - Mountain Artillery Group "Sondrio", *1953-1989
  - Mountain Artillery Group "Vestone", *1953-1975
- 6th Mountain Artillery Regiment, *1941-1995
  - Mountain Artillery Group "Lanzo", *1935-1992
  - Mountain Artillery Group "Agordo", *1953-1991
  - Mountain Artillery Group "Pieve di Cadore", *1953-1975

===== Target Acquisition =====
- 5th Artillery Specialists Group "Medea", *1956-21 March 1991, named Artillery Specialists Group "Mantova" 1976-1986
- 6th Artillery Specialists Group "Montello", *1976-30 June 1991, named Artillery Specialists Group "Folgore" 1976-1986
- 7th Artillery Specialists Group "Casarsa", *1976-31 January 1991, named Artillery Specialists Group "Ariete" 1976-1986
- 12th Artillery Specialists Group "Biella", *1975-29 September 1992, named Artillery Specialists Group "Centauro" 1975-1986
- 30th Artillery Specialists Group "Brianza", *1975-28 February 1991, for III Army Corps, but only the 3rd battery was active as part of the Horse Artillery Regiment in Milan

=== Artiglieria Controaerei (Anti-aircraft Artillery) ===
==== Active units ====
Each Air-defense Artillery regiment consists of a HQ battery, a logistic support battery and an air-defense group.

- Anti-aircraft Artillery Command, *1941 (Sabaudia)
- Anti-aircraft Artillery Training Regiment (Sabaudia)
- 4th Anti-aircraft Artillery Regiment "Peschiera", *1930 (Mantova)
- 17th Anti-aircraft Artillery Regiment "Sforzesca", *1888 (Sabaudia)
- 121st Anti-aircraft Artillery Regiment "Ravenna", *1941 (Bologna)

==== Inactive units ====
- Anti-Aircraft Artillery Command, *???
- 1st Heavy Anti-aircraft Artillery Regiment, *1947-1964
- 2nd Anti-aircraft Artillery Regiment, *1992-1996
- 3rd Anti-aircraft Artillery Regiment "Firenze", *1992-2001
- 5th Anti-aircraft Artillery Regiment "Pescara", *1964-2014
- 8th Anti-aircraft Artillery Regiment, *1992-1995
  - 8th Heavy Field Artillery Group "Marmore", *1986-1992
    - 8th Heavy Field Artillery Regiment, *1951-1986
- 18th Anti-aircraft Artillery Regiment, *1992-1997
  - 18th Field Artillery Group "Gran Sasso", *1976-1981

Light anti-aircraft artillery groups were activated in 1975 as reserve units with older equipment, but never filled with troops. They were named for birds of prey and disbanded in the early 1990s:

- 11th Light Anti-aircraft Artillery Group "Falco", *1975-??
- 12th Light Anti-aircraft Artillery Group "Nibbio", *1975-??
- 13th Light Anti-aircraft Artillery Group "Condor", *1975-??
- 14th Light Anti-aircraft Artillery Group "Astore", *1975-??
- 21st Light Anti-aircraft Artillery Group "Sparviero", *1975-??
- 22nd Light Anti-aircraft Artillery Group "Alcione", *1975-??

=== Special Artillery Units ===
- 7th CBRN Defense Regiment "Cremona", *1860 (Civitavecchia)
  - 7th Field Artillery Regiment "Cremona", *1992-1998
    - 7th Field Artillery Group "Adria", *1975-1992
      - 7th Field Artillery Regiment, *1946-1975
- 41st IMINT Regiment "Cordenons", *1975 (Casarsa della Delizia)
  - 41st Heavy Field Artillery Regiment, *1952-1975
    - 41st Artillery Regiment "Firenze", *1915-1952
- 13th HUMINT Regiment, *2016 (Anzio)
  - 13th Battalion "Aquileia", *2005 (Anzio)
    - 13th Target Acquisition Group "Aquileia", *1960-1993, re-raised in 2005 (Verona)
- 1st NBC Battalion "Etruria", *1967-1994 (Rieti)

== Engineer Corps ==
=== History ===
The Engineer Corps was founded on 11 June 1775 as the "Royal Corps of Engineers" ("Corpo Reale degli Ingegneri") of the army of the Kingdom of Piedmont-Sardinia. With the integration of the engineer units of the Italian states conquered during the Second Italian War of Independence the Corps was elevated on 11 January 1861 to a service branch of the Army and became the "Arma del Genio". In 1915 when Italy entered World War I the Royal Italian Army fielded six regiments and two battalions:

- 1st Engineer Regiment (Sappers), in Pavia
- 2nd Engineer Regiment (Sappers), in Casale Monferrato
- 3rd Engineer Regiment (Telegraphers), in Florence
- 4th Engineer Regiment (Pontieri), in Piacenza
- 5th Engineer Regiment (Miners), in Turin
- 6th Engineer Regiment (Ferrovieri), in Turin
- Specialist Engineer Battalion
- Aviation Engineer Battalion (transferred to the Corpo Aeronautico Militare at the outbreak of hostilities)

During the war the Engineer Branch expanded and created new types of units:

- Sappers companies were mostly employed to build the trenches along the Isonzo front - expanded from 43x to 236x companies
- Flamethrower companies - 9x were raised
- Telegraphers companies tasked with managing the military's communications - expanded from 24x to 139x companies
- Telephone companies tasked with laying and maintaining phone cables along the front - 57x companies were raised
- Pontieri companies - expanded from 12x to 26x companies
- Ferrovieri companies - expanded from 6x to 22x companies
- Miners companies tasked with building defensive positions in the Alps - expanded from 20x to 53x companies
- Lagunari companies tasked with providing transportation in the Marano lagoon and on Lake Garda and Lake Idro

Besides these also transport, ropeway, photography and poison gas companies were raised during the war.

In May 1940 when Italy entered World War II the branch fielded 18x engineer regiments, which contained a mix of sappers and signalers. The branch also fielded two mining, two Pontieri, and one Ferrovieri regiment. During the war each division received a mixed engineer battalion providing sappers and signalers. After the war the branch was rebuilt as part of the Italian Army, fielding three pioneer, one Pontieri, one Ferrovieri and one fortification engineer battalion, along with mixed engineer battalions for the army's divisions. In 1953 the signal units were split from the engineer branch to form their own service branch.

In 1975 all independent battalions of the engineer branch were named for a lake if they supported a corps or named for a river if they supported a division or brigade. In the same year every brigade of the army received a pioneer company, which carried the name of the brigade they it was subordinated to. The battalions of the 2nd Pontieri Engineer Regiment and the Ferrovieri Engineer Regiment received no names. In 1975 the army fielded two miners, one sapper and nine pioneer battalions, and 24x brigade engineer companies.

After the end of the Cold War the army renamed all battalions as regiments, although the composition of the units didn't change. In 1993 the brigade's engineer companies were merged with the brigade's signal companies to create Command and Tactical Support Units. After 2001 the engineer companies of the Command and Tactical Support Units were merged with the existing engineer battalions and each brigade received an engineer regiment.

=== Active units ===
Today the service branch is divided into four specialties: Sappers ("Guastatori"), Pioneers ("Pionieri"), Bridge Engineers ("Pontieri") and Railroad Engineers ("Ferrovieri"). Units marked with a ^{*} are named after rivers.

- Engineer Command, *???- (Cecchignola)
- 2nd Engineer Regiment, *1860-1919, 1922–1943, 1954–1975, 1995- (Trento)
  - 2nd Mining Engineer Battalion "Iseo", *1975-1995
  - XXXI Sapper Battalion
- 3rd Engineer Regiment, *1922-1943, 1954–1975, 1992- (Udine)
  - 3rd Sapper Battalion "Verbano", *1976-1992
- 4th Engineer Regiment, *1922-1943, 1992- (Palermo)
  - 51st Engineer Battalion "Simeto"^{*}, *1983-1992, entered the reactivated 4th Engineer Regiment in 1992, which held the 51st's flag (which included the traditions of the 12th Engineer Regiment) until its own flag was returned in 1995
- 5th Engineer Regiment, *1895-1943, 1951–75, 2003- (Macomer)
  - 5th Engineer Battalion "Bolsena", *1976-2001
- 6th Pioneer Regiment, *1922-1943, 1993- (Rome)
  - 6th Engineer Battalion "Trasimeno", *1976-1993
    - Pioneer Battalion "Granatieri di Sardegna", *1952-1975
  - Pioneer Battalion "Nemi", *2005-
- 7th CIMIC Regiment, *2023- (Motta di Livenza)
  - 104th Engineer Battalion "Torre", *1976-1986
    - Pioneer Battalion "Mantova", *1949-1975
- 8th Paratroopers Engineer Regiment "Folgore", *1922-1943, 1992–1995, 2004- (Legnago)
  - 8th Paratroopers Sappers Battalion, *2001-2004
    - VIII Paratroopers Engineer Battalion, *1941-1942
- 10th Engineer Regiment, *1922-1943, 1993- (Cremona)
  - 3rd Engineer Battalion "Lario", *1975-1993
    - III Army Corps Engineer Battalion, *1953-1975
- 11th Engineer Regiment, *1928-1943, 1993- (Foggia)
  - 132nd Engineer Battalion "Livenza"^{*}, *1975-1993
    - Pioneer Battalion "Ariete", *1958-1975
- 21st Engineer Regiment, *1937-1942, 1993- (Caserta)
  - 21st Engineer Battalion "Timavo"^{*}, *1975-1993
    - XXI Pioneer Battalion, *1953-1975
- 32nd Engineer Regiment, *2004- (Turin)
  - 32nd Engineer Battalion, *1941-1942, 2002-2004
  - XXX Sapper Battalion
  - XXXII Sapper Battalion
- Ferrovieri Engineer Regiment, *1910-1943, 1957- (Castel Maggiore)
- 2nd Pontieri Engineer Regiment, *1883-1943, 1949- (Piacenza)

=== Inactive units ===
Inactivated units of the Engineer branch follow below. Units marked with a ^{*} are named after rivers.

- 1st Engineer Regiment, *1848-1943, 1950–1964, 1993-1995
  - 1st Mining Engineer Battalion "Garda", *1975-1991
- 4th Engineer Battalion "Orta", *1975-1993, entered the 1st Engineer Regiment in 1993 with the flag of the 4th Engineer Regiment, the flag was returned to the 4th in 1995
- 131st Engineer Battalion "Ticino"^{*}, *1975-1993, flag of the 9th Engineer Regiment (*1922-1953)
  - Pioneer Battalion "Centauro", *1958-1975
    - CXXXI Mixed Engineer Battalion, *1939-1943
- 184th Engineer Battalion "Santerno"^{*}, *1975-1992, flag of the 8th Engineer Regiment
  - Pioneer Battalion "Folgore", *1944-1975

== Signal Corps ==
=== History ===
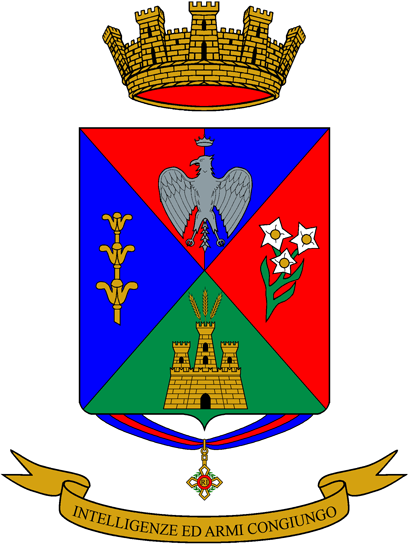
Coat of Arms 11th Signal Regiment

The Signal branch of the army began as a speciality of the army's engineer branch, when in 1883 two telegraph battalions were raised and joined the 3rd Engineer Regiment. During World War I the speciality expanded rapidly and the war's end fielded 139x Telegraph Companies and 57x Telephone Companies. After the war a second Telegraph Regiment was raised and 26 Telegraph battalions were assigned to various commands of the army. During World War II the Signal Speciality raised a hundreds of units to join the various divisions of the Regio Esercito.

After the war the specialty was finally split from the Engineer Branch and on 16 May 1953 became an autonomous specialty of the army. Over the years the specialty grew and on 30 December 1997 it was finally elevated to a service branch of the army, with two specialities: Signal specialists and Electronic Warfare Specialists.

=== Active units ===
If not specified otherwise all Signal battalions below were activated in 1975. All signal battalions, with the exception of the 45th, 46th, 47th, 51st and 184th, were named after Italian mountain passes. The 45th and 46th were named after volcanoes, while the 47th and 184th were named after mountain massifs and the 51st kept the name of the Cold War "Legnano" division it once belonged to.

- Signal Command, *2007 (Anzio)
- Tactical Intelligence Brigade, *2001 (Anzio)
- NRDC-ITA Support Brigade, *2001 (Milan)
- Signal and IT School, (Rome)
- 1st Signal Regiment, *1919 (Milan)
  - 3rd Signal Battalion "Spluga", formed in 1975, elevated to 1st Signal Regiment in 1995
  - 231st Signal Battalion "Sempione", formed in 1975, disbanded 1991, reformed and entered the 1st Signal Regiment in 2001
- 2nd Alpine Signal Regiment (Alpini), *1926 (Bolzano)
  - 4th Signal Battalion "Gardena", formed in 1975, elevated to 2nd (Alpine) Signal Regiment in 1992
  - 42nd Signal Battalion "Pordoi", formed in 1975, disbanded 1992, reformed and entered the 2nd (Alpine) Signal Regiment in 2005
- 3rd Signal Regiment, *1883 (Rome)
  - 10th Signal Battalion "Lanciano", formed in 1975, elevated to 3rd Signal Regiment in 1993
  - 43rd Signal Battalion "Abetone", formed in 1975, elevated to 43rd Signal Regiment in 1993, regiment disbanded in 1998 and the battalion entered the 3rd Signal Regiment the next day
  - 47th Signal Battalion "Gennargentu", formed in 1996, entered 3rd Signal Regiment in 2000
- 7th Signal Regiment, *1918 (Sacile)
  - 5th Signal Battalion "Rolle", formed in 1975, elevated to 7th Signal Regiment in 1992
  - 107th Signal Battalion "Predil", formed in 1975, disbanded 1991, reformed and entered the 7th Signal Regiment in 2002
- 9th Cybernetic Security Regiment "Rombo", *2023 (Rome)
  - 9th Electronic Warfare Battalion "Rombo", *1976 - inactivated on 20 January 1998
- 11th Signal Regiment, *1940 (Civitavecchia)
  - 8th Signals Intelligence Battalion "Tonale", formed in 1976, disbanded 1998, reformed as Signal Battalion "Tonale" and entered the 11th Signal Regiment in 2001
  - 11th Signal Battalion "Leonessa", formed in 1975, elevated to 11th Signal Regiment in 1992
- 32nd Signal Regiment, *1953 (Padua)
  - 32nd Signal Battalion "Valles", formed in 1975, elevated to 32nd Signal Regiment in 1992
  - 41st Signal Battalion "Frejus", formed in 1975, elevated to 41st Signal Regiment in 1993, regiment disbanded in 1998 and the battalion entered the 32nd Signal Regiment the next day
- 33rd EW Regiment, *2002 (Treviso)
  - 33rd Electronic Warfare Battalion "Falzarego", formed in 1975, elevated to 33rd Electronic Warfare Regiment in 2002
- 44th TLC Support Battalion "Penne", reverted to battalion in 2016
  - 44th Signal Support Regiment, *1993-2016 (Rome)
    - 44th Signal Battalion "Penne", formed in 1957, named "Penne" in 1975, elevated to 44th Signal Regiment in 1993, became 44th Signal Support Regiment in 1997
- 46th Signal Regiment, *1997 (Palermo)
  - 45th Signal Battalion "Vulture", formed in 1975, elevated to 45th Signal Regiment in 1993, regiment disbanded in 2000 and the battalion entered the 46th Signal Regiment the next day
  - 46th Signal Battalion "Mongibello", formed in 1976, elevated to 46th Signal Regiment in 1997
- 184th TLC Support Battalion "Cansiglio", reverted to battalion in 2016
  - 184th Signal Support Regiment, *1998-2016 (Treviso)
    - 184th Signal Battalion "Cansiglio", formed in 1944, named "Cansiglio" in 1975, disbanded in 1993, reformed in 1998 as 184th Signal Support Regiment
- 232nd Signal Regiment, *1939-1991, activated anew in 2004 (Avellino)
  - Signal Battalion "Legnano", formed in 2004
  - 232nd Signal Battalion "Fadalto", formed in 1975, disbanded 1991, reformed and entered the 232nd Signal Regiment in 2015

=== Inactive units ===
Inactivated units of the Signal branch:

- Maneuver Support Signal Brigade, *1998-2007
- National Support Signal Brigade, *2000-2007
- 13th Signal Battalion "Mauria", *1975 - inactivated on 30 November 1991

== Transport and Material Corps ==
=== Active units ===
- Logistic Regiment "Aosta", *2015— (Messina)
  - Logistic Battalion "Aosta", *1975—2002
- Logistic Regiment "Ariete", *2015— (Maniago)
  - Logistic Battalion "Ariete", *1986—2015
    - Logistic Battalion "Manin", *1975—1986
- Logistic Regiment "Folgore", *2015— (Pisa)
  - 6th Maneuver Logistic Regiment, *2001—2015
    - Logistic Battalion "Folgore", *1975—2001
- 6th General Support Logistic Regiment, *2015— (Budrio)
  - 6th Transport Regiment, *2001—2015
    - Logistic Battalion "Friuli", *1975—2001
- Logistic Regiment "Garibaldi", *2015— (Persano)
  - 10th Maneuver Regiment, *2001—2015
    - Logistic Battalion "Garibaldi", *1976—2001
- Logistic Regiment "Julia", *2015— (Meran)
  - 24th Alpine Maneuver Regiment, *2001—2015
    - 24th Maneuver Regiment "Dolomiti", *1994—2001
      - 24th Maneuver Logistic Battalion "Dolomiti", *1986—1994
        - 4th Maneuver Logistic Battalion, *1981—1986
- Logistic Regiment "Pinerolo", *2015— (Bari)
  - 10th Transport Regiment, *2001—2015
    - 10th Logistic Support Regiment, *1998—2001
      - 10th Transport Battalion "Appia", *1987—1998
- Logistic Regiment "Pozzuolo del Friuli", *2015— (Remanzacco)
  - 8th Transport Regiment, *2002—2015
    - 8th Maneuver Regiment "Carso", *1994—2002
      - 8th Maneuver Logistic Battalion "Carso", *1986—1994
        - Maneuver Logistic Battalion "Mantova", *1980—1986
          - Logistic Battalion "Mantova", *1976—1980
- Logistic Regiment "Sassari", *2019— (Cagliari)
  - Logistic Battalion "Cremona", *1975—1996
- Logistic Regiment "Taurinense", *2015 (Rivoli)
  - 1st Maneuver Regiment, *2001—2015
    - 1st Logistic Support Regiment "Monviso", *1998—2001
      - 1st Transport Battalion "Monviso", *1990—1998
- Joint Forces Maneuver Regiment, *2004— (Rome)
  - 10th Joint Forces Maneuver Auto Group "Salaria", *1976—2004
- Transit Areas Management Regiment, *2015— (Bellinzago Novarese)
  - 1st Transport Regiment, *2001—2015
    - Logistic Battalion "Centauro", *1986—2001
      - Logistic Battalion "Curtatone", *1976—1986
- 8th Transport Regiment "Casilina", *1984— (Rome)
- 11th Transport Regiment "Flaminia", *1976— (Rome)
- 33rd Logistic and Tactical Support Regiment "Ambrosiano", *2022— (Solbiate Olona)
  - Logistic and Tactical Support Regiment, *2002—2022
    - 33rd Maneuver Logistic Regiment "Ambrosiano", *1993—2001
      - 33rd Maneuver Logistic Battalion "Ambrosiano", *1986—1993
        - 3rd Maneuver Logistic Battalion, *1982—1986

=== Inactive units ===
- 3rd Army Corps Auto Group "Fulvia", *1976—1982
- 4th Army Corps Auto Group "Claudia", *1976—1982
- 5th Army Corps Auto Group "Postumia", *1976—1983
- 13th Logistic Battalion "Aquileia", *1982—1991
- Logistic Battalion "Acqui", *1975—1996
- Logistic Battalion "Brescia", *1975—1991
- Logistic Battalion "Cadore", *1976—1997
- Logistic Battalion "Goito", *1976—1991
- Logistic Battalion "Granatieri di Sardegna", *1975—2002
- Logistic Battalion "Gorizia", *1975—1997
- Logistic Battalion "Julia", *1976—2002
- Logistic Battalion "Legnano", *1975—1996
- Logistic Battalion "Mameli", *1975—1991
- Logistic Battalion "Mantova", *1975—1996
  - Logistic Battalion "Isonzo", *1975—1986
- Logistic Battalion "Orobica", *1976—1991
- Logistic Battalion "Pinerolo", *1975—2001
- Logistic Battalion "Pozzuolo del Friuli", *1975—2002
- Logistic Battalion "Taurinense", *1975—2001
- Logistic Battalion "Trieste", *1975—1991
- Logistic Battalion "Tridentina", *1976—2002
- Logistic Battalion "Vittorio Veneto", *1975—1991
- 5th Maneuver Logistic Battalion "Euganeo", *1986—???
  - Maneuver Logistic Battalion "Folgore", *1981—1986
    - Logistic Battalion "Folgore", *1976—1981
- 50th Maneuver Logistic Battalion "Carnia", *1986—1991
  - Maneuver Logistic Battalion "Ariete", *1981—1986
    - Logistic Battalion "Ariete", *1976—1981
- Logistic Battalion "Piemonte", *1988—1991
  - Maneuver Logistic Battalion "Piemonte", *1987—1988
    - Maneuver Logistic Battalion "Centauro", *1981—1986
      - Logistic Battalion "Centauro", *1976—1981
- 7th Transport Battalion "Monte Amiata"
- 11th Transport Battalion "Etnea"
- 14th Transport Battalion "Flavia"
- Logistic Battalion Persano, *1989—1991
- 5th Maneuver Logistic Battalion, *1981—1989
- 12th Transport Battalion
- 16th Transport Battalion

== Army Aviation Corps ==
=== History ===
In May 1951 the first aviation unit was created at the army's Artillery School in Bracciano. The first aircraft in service were L-18C Super Cubs. In 1952 the army created four Light Plane Sections to support its four army corps. In 1956 the first AB 47G helicopters arrived. On 1 June 1957 the training unit was moved to Viterbo and became the Army Light Aviation Training Center. By 1964 four units of helicopters and 19 sections of light airplanes existed. By 1974 four helicopter units and 27 Light Aviation units fielded a mix of L-18C Super Cub, L-19E Bird Dog, and L-21B Super Cub planes and AB 47G planes, and AB 47G, AB 47J, AB 204B, AB 205, AB 206 helicopters.

With the army reform in 1975 the light planes and helicopter units were merged into squadron groups, equally in size to a battalion. Additionally three Army Light Aviation Groupings were created: one for the IV Alpine Army Corps, one for the V Army Corps, and one for the general staff. The new units were named for celestial objects: Groupings were named for stars, while squadron groups were named for constellations and planets of the Solar System.

After the Cold War the army reduced the number of squadrons groups, renamed the groupings to regiments and dropped the "Light" from the specialties name.

=== Active units ===
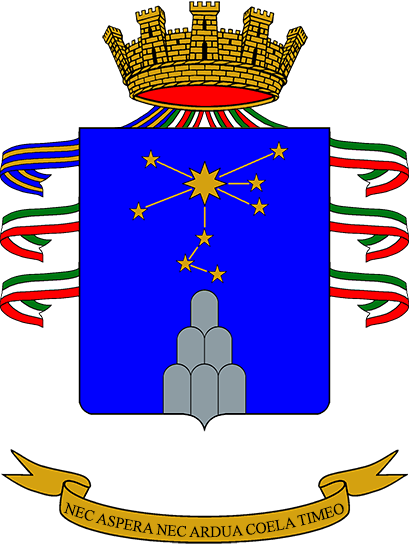
Coat of Arms 4th Army Aviation Regiment

- Army Aviation Command, *1997- (Viterbo)
- Army Aviation Training Center, *1952- (Viterbo)
  - 1st Training Squadrons Group "Auriga"
  - 1st Ground Support Squadrons Group "Sestante"
- 1st Army Aviation Regiment "Antares", *1976- (Viterbo)
  - 11th Squadrons Group "Ercole"
  - 28th Squadrons Group "Tucano"
  - 51st Squadrons Group "Leone" - inactivated on 4 November 2002 - reactivated 6 April 2021
- 2nd Army Aviation Regiment "Sirio", *1996- (Lamezia Terme)
  - 21st Squadrons Group "Orsa Maggiore"
  - 30th Squadrons Group "Pegaso"
- 3rd Special Operations Helicopter Regiment "Aldebaran", *1993-1998, 2015- (Viterbo)
  - 26th Squadrons Group "Giove"
- 4th Army Aviation Regiment "Altair", *1976- (Bolzano)
  - 34th Squadrons Group "Toro"
  - 54th Squadrons Group "Cefeo"
- 5th Army Aviation Regiment "Rigel", *1976- (Casarsa della Delizia)
  - 27th Squadrons Group "Mercurio"
  - 49th Squadrons Group "Capricorno"
- 7th Army Aviation Regiment "Vega", *1996- (Rimini)
  - 25th Squadrons Group "Cigno"
  - 48th Squadrons Group "Pavone"
- 1st Army Aviation Support Regiment "Idra", *1953- (Bracciano)
- 2nd Army Aviation Support Regiment "Orione", *1957- (Bologna)
- 3rd Army Aviation Support Regiment "Aquila", *1965- (Orio al Serio)
- 4th Army Aviation Support Squadrons Group "Scorpione", *1976- (Viterbo)

=== Inactive units ===
Inactivated units of the Aviation speciality:

- Army Aviation Brigade, *2001-2023 (Viterbo)
- 12th Squadrons Group "Gru" - inactivated on 1 September 1981
- 20th Squadrons Group "Andromeda" - inactivated during 2013-2014
- 23rd Squadrons Group "Eridano" - inactivated in 1993
- 24th Squadrons Group "Orione" - inactivated on 31 December 1993
- 39th Squadrons Group "Drago" - inactivated on 4 November 2002
- 44th Squadrons Group "Fenice" - inactivated on 4 July 1996
- 46th Squadrons Group "Sagittario" - inactivated in 1993
- 47th Squadrons Group "Levrieri"
- 53rd Squadrons Group "Cassiopea" - inactivated 31 December 2015
- 55th Squadrons Group "Dragone" - inactivated 1 March 2006
