= 5th Maneuver Logistic Battalion "Euganeo" =

Inactive Italian Army corps logistics unit

- 5° Battaglione Logistico di Manovra "Euganeo"
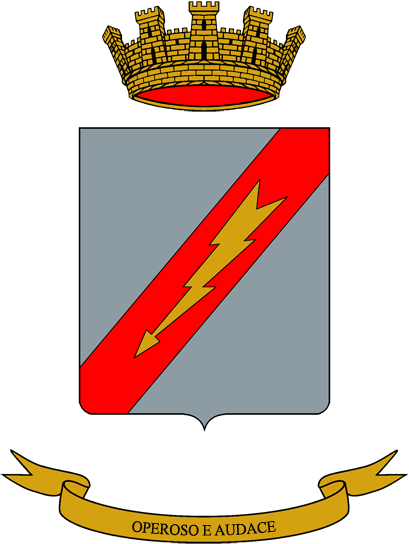
- Battalion coat of arms
- Active: 1 Feb. 1976 — 31 Oct. 1996
- Country: Italy
- Branch: Italian Army
- Role: Military logistics
- Part of: 5th Army Corps
- Garrison/HQ: Treviso
- Motto: "Operoso e audace"
- Anniversaries: 22 May 1916 - Battle of Asiago
- Decorations: 1× Bronze Cross of Army Merit

Insignia
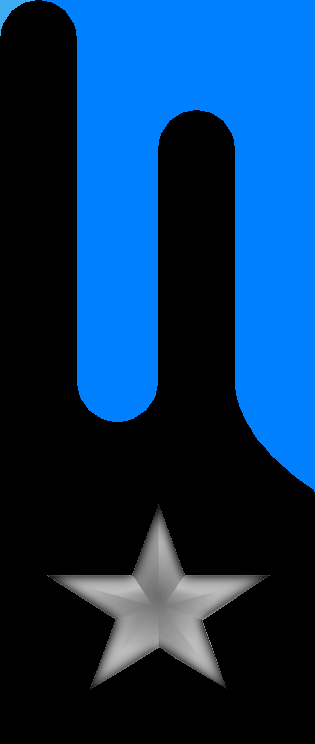
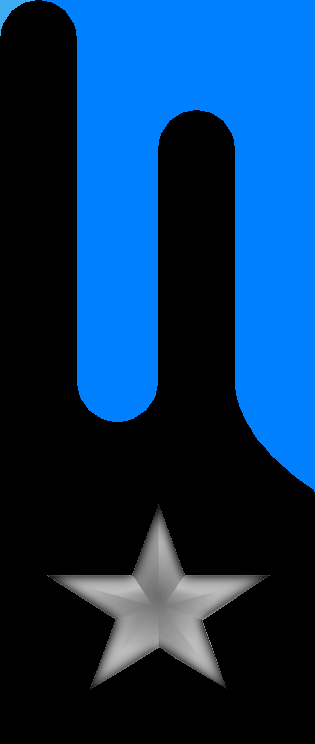
- Unit gorget patches

The 5th Maneuver Logistic Battalion "Euganeo" (Italian: 5° Battaglione Logistico di Manovra "Euganeo") is an inactive military logistics battalion of the Italian Army. The battalion was formed in 1976 as Logistic Battalion "Folgore" and assigned to the Mechanized Division "Folgore". After the division was disbanded in 1986 the battalion was reorganized as a corps logistic battalion, renamed 5th Maneuver Logistic Battalion "Euganeo" and assigned to the 5th Army Corps. The battalion was disbanded in 1996. The battalion's anniversary falls, as for all units of the Italian Army's Transport and Materiel Corps, on 22 May, the anniversary of the Royal Italian Army's first major use of automobiles to transport reinforcements to the Asiago plateau to counter the Austro-Hungarian Asiago Offensive in May 1916.

== History ==
=== World War II ===
The battalion is the spiritual successor of the logistic units of the Royal Italian Army's 184th Infantry Division "Nembo", which was formed on 15 November 1942 in Pisa. In the evening of 8 September 1943, the Armistice of Cassibile, which ended hostilities between the Kingdom of Italy and the Anglo-American Allies, was announced by General Dwight D. Eisenhower on Radio Algiers and by Marshal Pietro Badoglio on Italian radio. The German reacted to the armistice by invading Italy. The "Nembo" division remained loyal to King Victor Emmanuel III and joined the Italian Co-belligerent Army's Italian Liberation Corps. On 31 May 1944, the division entered combat against German forces on the Italian front. In September 1944, the division's remaining personnel was used to form the Paratroopers Regiment "Nembo" and the support units of the newly formed Combat Group "Folgore". The Combat Group "Folgore" then returned to the front and fought in the Italian campaign until the German surrender.

=== Cold War ===
On 15 October 1945, the Combat Group "Folgore" was reorganized as Infantry Division "Folgore". On 1 November 1956, the logistic units of the division were assigned to the newly formed Service Units Command "Folgore" in Treviso. The command consisted of a medical section, a provisions section, a mobile vehicle park, a mobile workshop, an auto unit, and the 7th Field Hospital. On 1 December 1961, the mobile vehicle park, mobile workshop, and the light workshops of the division's regiments merged to form the Resupply, Repairs, Recovery Unit "Folgore".

On 1 January 1972, the Service Units Command "Folgore" in Udine was reorganized as Services Grouping Command "Folgore". The command consisted of a command, the Auto Unit "Folgore", the Provisions Company "Folgore", the Resupply, Repairs, Recovery Unit "Folgore", and the Medical Battalion "Folgore", which consisted of the 7th Field Hospital and a medical company.

As part of the 1975 army reform the units of the Infantry Division "Folgore" were reorganized and, on 1 February 1976, the division's services grouping command in Treviso was reorganized as Logistic Battalion "Folgore", which received the traditions of all preceding logistic, transport, medical, maintenance, and supply units bearing the name "Nembo" or "Folgore". The battalion consisted of a command, a command platoon, a supply and transport company, a medium workshop, and a vehicle park. At the time the battalion fielded 472 men (21 officers, 66 non-commissioned officers, and 385 soldiers).

On 12 November 1976, the President of the Italian Republic Giovanni Leone granted with decree 846 the battalion a flag.

On 1 December 1981, the battalion was reorganized and renamed Maneuver Logistic Battalion "Folgore". At the time the battalion consisted of the following units:

- Maneuver Logistic Battalion "Folgore", in Treviso
  - Command and Services Company
  - Supply Company
  - Maintenance Company
  - Medium Transport Company
  - Mixed Transport Company

In 1986, the Italian Army abolished the divisional level and brigades, which until then had been under one of the Army's four divisions, came under direct command of the Army's 3rd Army Corps or 5th Army Corps. On 31 October 1986, the Mechanized Division "Folgore" was disbanded and the next day the Maneuver Logistic Battalion "Folgore" was assigned to the Support Units Command of the 5th Army Corps. On the same date, 1 November 1986, the battalion was renamed 5th Maneuver Logistic Battalion "Euganeo", and the traditions of the preceding "Nembo" and "Folgore" logistic units were transferred to the Paratroopers Logistic Battalion "Folgore" of the Paratroopers Brigade "Folgore". As per army naming convention for logistic units supporting corps-level commands the 5th Maneuver Logistic Battalion "Euganeo" was named for a geographic feature in the corps' area of operations; in case of the Maneuver Logistic Battalion for the Euganean Hills.

=== Recent times ===
From 1 September 1991 to 3 December 1993, the battalion supported the logistic center and medical point in Durrës in Albania operated by the 8th Maneuver Logistic Battalion "Carso", as well as the logistic center and medical point in Vlorë in Albania operated by the Logistic Battalion "Acqui". For its conduct and work in Albania the battalion was awarded a Bronze Cross of Army Merit, which was affixed to the battalion's flag. At the same time the battalion also incorporated the 51st Medical Unit (Reserve).

On 31 October 1996, the 5th Maneuver Logistic Battalion "Euganeo" and the 14th Transport Battalion "Flavia" in Montorio Veronese were disbanded. The next day the personnel and materiel of the two battalions were used to form the 14th Military Region Logistic Unit "Flavia" in Montorio Veronese. The following 13 November the flag of the 5th Maneuver Logistic Battalion "Euganeo" was transferred to the Shrine of the Flags in the Vittoriano in Rome for safekeeping.

== See also ==
- Military logistics
