= 33rd Logistic and Tactical Support Regiment "Ambrosiano" =

Active Italian Army logistics unit

- 33° Reggimento Supporto Tattico e Logistico "Ambrosiano"
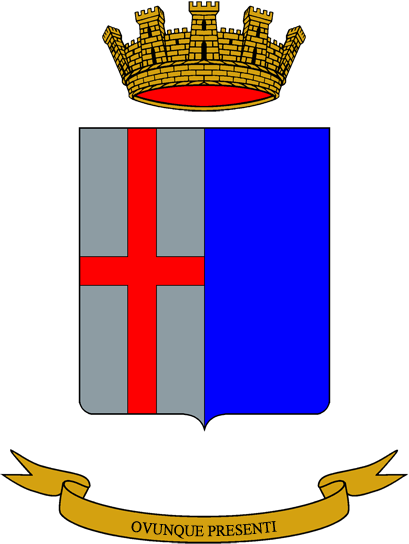
- Regimental coat of arms
- Active: 1 Nov. 1986 — 31 July 2001; 16 June 2002 — today
- Country: Italy
- Branch: Italian Army
- Role: Military logistics
- Part of: NRDC-ITA Support Brigade
- Garrison/HQ: Solbiate Olona
- Motto(s): "Ovunque presenti"
- Anniversaries: 22 May 1916 - Battle of Asiago
- Decorations: 1× Silver Cross of Army Merit; 1× Italian Red Cross Bronze Medal of Merit

Insignia
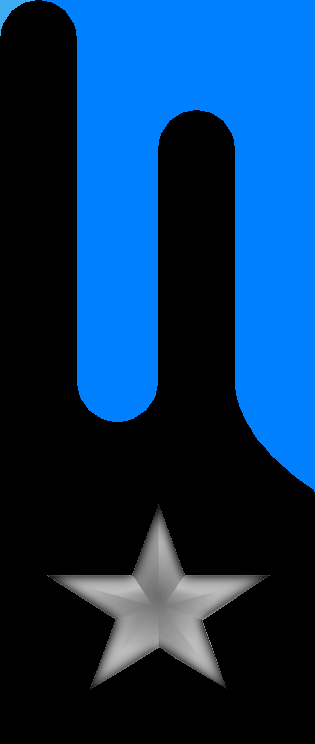
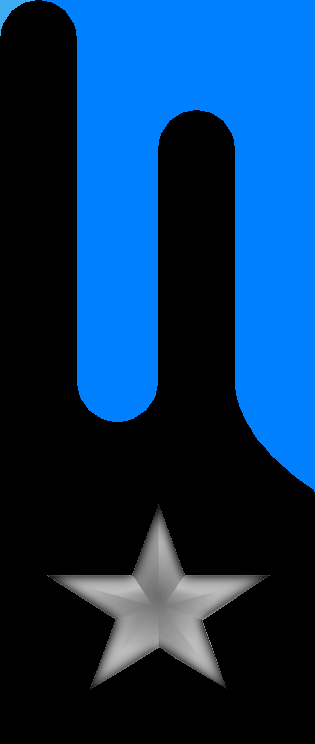
- Unit gorget patches

The 33rd Logistic and Tactical Support Regiment "Ambrosiano" (Italian: 33° Reggimento Supporto Tattico e Logistico "Ambrosiano") is a military logistics regiment of the Italian Army based in Solbiate Olona in Lombardy. The regiment is assigned to the NRDC-ITA Support Brigade and provides the necessary logistics and security assets for the NATO Rapid Deployable Corps – Italy headquarters to operate. The regiment was formed on 16 Juni 2002 as Logistic and Tactical Support Regiment. On 27 October 2006, the regiment was assigned the name, flag, traditions and coat of arms of the 33rd Maneuver Logistic Regiment "Ambrosiano". The regiment's anniversary falls, as for all units of the Italian Army's Transport and Materiel Corps, on 22 May, the anniversary of the Royal Italian Army's first major use of automobiles to transport reinforcements to the Asiago plateau to counter the Austro-Hungarian Asiago Offensive in May 1916.

== History ==
=== Cold War ===
On 1 January 1982, the 3rd Maneuver Logistic Battalion was formed in Milan by reorganizing the 3rd Resupply, Repairs, Recovery Unit of the 3rd Army Corps. Initially the battalion consisted of a command, a command and services company, a supply company, and a maintenance company. On 30 June 1982, the 3rd Army Corps Auto Group "Fulvia" in Milan was disbanded and the next day the disbanded group's two mixed auto units were used to form a medium transport company and a mixed transport company, which were assigned to the 3rd Maneuver Logistic Battalion.

On 1 November 1986, as part of the 1986 army reform, the battalion was renamed 33rd Maneuver Logistic Battalion "Ambrosiano". Per army naming convention logistic units supporting corps-level commands should have been named for a geographic feature in the corps' area of operations, however the battalion was named for the patron saint of the city of Milan Saint Ambrose, making it only one of two Italian Army units named for saints. (The other being the 1st Motorized Infantry Battalion "San Giusto", named for the patron saint of the city of Trieste Justus of Trieste.)

The same year the battalion was augmented with an additional mixed transport company, two armored transport platoons, and a multi-role helicopter section. On 13 July 1987, President of the Italian Republic Francesco Cossiga granted the battalion a flag.

=== Recent times ===
In 1992-93, personnel of the "Ambrosiano" regiment reinforced the Logistic Battalion "Folgore" and the Medical Unit "Centauro" for the two units' deployment to Somalia with the Unified Task Force. On 29 April 1993, the 33rd Maneuver Logistic Battalion "Ambrosiano" lost its autonomy and the next day the battalion entered the newly formed 33rd Maneuver Logistic Regiment "Ambrosiano". At the same time the regiment also incorporated the 31st Medical Unit (Reserve). In 1995, the regiment moved from Milan to Solbiate Olona. On 16 September 1996, the regiment was transferred from the 3rd Army Corps to the Support Units Command "Legnano".

On 1 October 1997, the 3rd Army Corps was renamed Projection Forces Command. On 31 December 1997, the Support Units Command "Legnano" was disbanded and the 33rd Maneuver Logistic Regiment "Ambrosiano" was assigned to the Projection Forces Command, which in January 2001 was reorganized as Rapid Reaction Corps. On 31 July 2001, the 33rd Maneuver Logistic Regiment "Ambrosiano" was disbanded and the next day its personnel formed the Rapid Reaction Corps Command Unit. Consequently, on 3 August 2001, the flag of the 33rd Maneuver Logistic Regiment "Ambrosiano" was transferred to the Shrine of the Flags in the Vittoriano in Rome for safekeeping.

On 1 November 2001, the Command Unit was assigned to the Rapid Reaction Corps' newly formed Signal Brigade. On 16 June 2002, the Command Unit was renamed Logistic and Tactical Support Regiment. On 16 April 2006, the regiment retrieved the flag of the 33rd Maneuver Logistic Regiment "Ambrosiano" from the Shrine of the Flags and on 27 October of the same year the regiment was officially assigned the flag in a ceremony in Solbiate Olona.

On 1 June 2022, the regiment was renamed 33rd Logistic and Tactical Support Regiment "Ambrosiano". For its conduct and work during the COVID-19 pandemic the regiment was awarded in 2022 a Silver Cross of Army Merit, which was affixed to the regiment's flag.

== Organization ==
As of 2024 the 33rd Logistic and Tactical Support Regiment "Ambrosiano" is organized as follows:

- 33rd Logistic and Tactical Support Regiment "Ambrosiano", in Solbiate Olona
  - Command and Logistic Support Company
  - Logistic and Tactical Support Battalion
    - Deployment Support Company
    - Transport Company
    - Security Company
    - Quartermaster Company

== See also ==
- Military logistics
