= Logistic Battalion "Goito" =

Inactive Italian Army brigade logistics unit

- Battaglione Logistico "Goito"
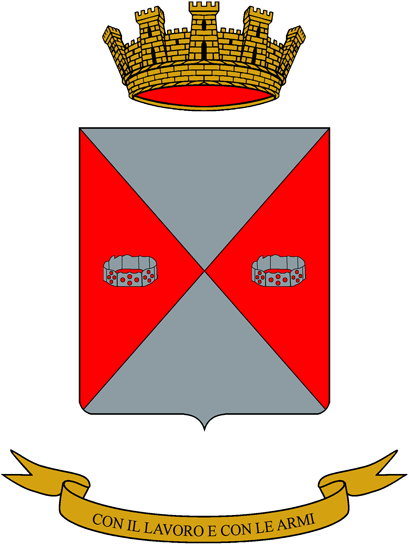
- Battalion coat of arms
- Active: 1 Jan. 1976 — 1 Aug. 1991
- Country: Italy
- Branch: Italian Army
- Type: Military logistics
- Part of: Mechanized Brigade "Goito"
- Garrison/HQ: Milan
- Motto(s): "Con il lavoro e con le armi"
- Anniversaries: 22 May 1916 - Battle of Asiago

Insignia
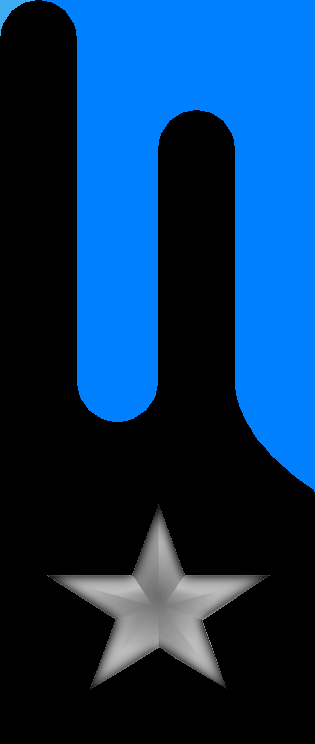
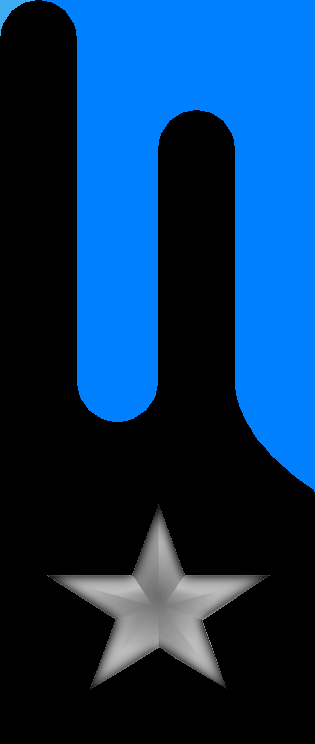
- Unit gorget patches

The Logistic Battalion "Goito" (Italian: Battaglione Logistico "Goito") is an inactive military logistics battalion of the Italian Army, which was assigned to the Mechanized Brigade "Goito". The battalion's anniversary falls, as for all units of the Italian Army's Transport and Materiel Corps, on 22 May, the anniversary of the Royal Italian Army's first major use of automobiles to transport reinforcements to the Asiago plateau to counter the Austro-Hungarian Asiago Offensive in May 1916.

== History ==
=== Cold War ===
In 1963, the Italian Army reorganized its armored divisions along NATO standards and added a brigade level to the divisions' organization. As part of the reorganization the Armored Division "Centauro" formed a services battalion for each of its three brigades. On 12 August 1965, the I Services Battalion "Centauro" was formed in Milan. On 1 March 1966, the battalion became operational and was assigned to the I Mechanized Brigade "Centauro".

Initially the battalion consisted of a command and a command and services platoon. On 1 January 1966, the battalion received a Resupply, Repairs, Recovery Unit. On 30 September 1968, the division's three brigade headquarters were disbanded and the next day, on 1 October 1968, the I Services Battalion "Centauro" was assigned to the division's Services Grouping Command "Centauro".

As part of the 1975 army reform the Armored Division "Centauro" was reorganized and on 21 October 1975 the 3rd Mechanized Brigade "Goito" and 31st Armored Brigade "Curtatone" were formed with the division's units. The same year the I Services Battalion "Centauro" moved from Milan to Monza, where, on 1 January 1976, the battalion was renamed Logistic Battalion "Goito" and assigned to the 3rd Mechanized Brigade "Goito".

Initially the battalion consisted of a command, a command platoon, and a supply and transport company. On 20 October 1977, the battalion formed a medium workshop and a vehicle park. At the time the battalion fielded 692 men (38 officers, 85 non-commissioned officers, and 569 soldiers).

On 12 November 1976, the President of the Italian Republic Giovanni Leone granted with decree 846 the battalion a flag.

In 1981, the battalion was reorganized and consisted afterwards of the following units:

- Logistic Battalion "Goito", in Monza
  - Command and Services Company
  - Supply Company
  - Maintenance Company
  - Medium Transport Company
  - Medical Unit (Reserve)

In 1982, the battalion returned to Milan.

=== Recent times ===
After the end of the Cold War the Italian Army began to draw down its forces. Consequently, on 1 June 1991, the Mechanized Brigade "Goito" was disbanded, followed on 1 August 1991, by the Logistic Battalion "Goito". On 7 November of the same year, the battalion's flag was transferred to the Shrine of the Flags in the Vittoriano in Rome for safekeeping.

== See also ==
- Military logistics
