= 7th Transport Battalion "Monte Amiata" =

Inactive Italian Army transport unit

- 7° Battaglione Trasporti "Monte Amiata"
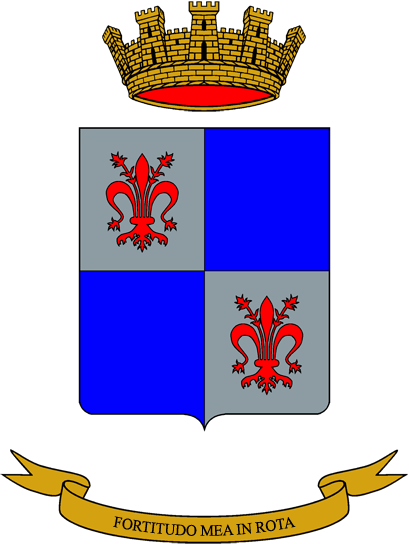
- Battalion coat of arms
- Active: 15 April 1991 — 30 June 1998
- Country: Italy
- Branch: Italian Army
- Role: Military logistics
- Garrison/HQ: Florence
- Motto: "Fortitudo mea in rota"
- Anniversaries: 22 May 1916 - Battle of Asiago

Insignia
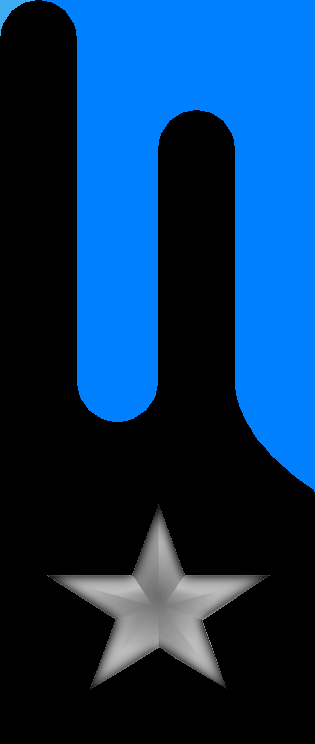
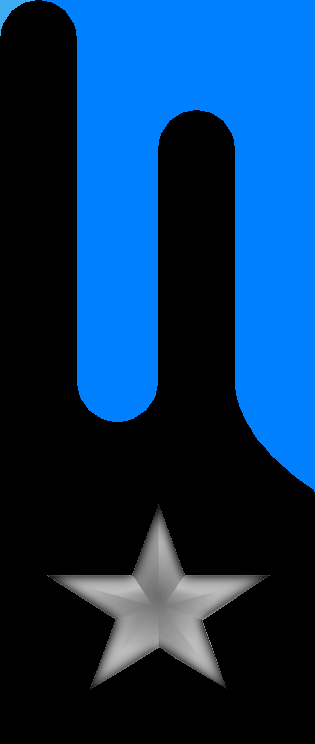
- Unit gorget patches

The 7th Transport Battalion "Monte Amiata" (Italian: 7° Battaglione Trasporti "Monte Amiata") is an inactive military logistics battalion of the Italian Army, which was based in Florence in Tuscany. Originally a transport regiment of the Royal Italian Army, the unit was last active from 1991 to 1998. The battalion's anniversary falls, as for all units of the Italian Army's Transport and Materiel Corps, on 22 May, the anniversary of the Royal Italian Army's first major use of automobiles to transport reinforcements to the Asiago plateau to counter the Austro-Hungarian Asiago Offensive in May 1916.

== History ==
=== Interwar years ===
On 13 May 1920, the VI Automobilistic Center was formed in Florence and assigned to the VI Army Corps. On 15 March 1923, the center was disbanded and its personnel and materiel used to form the VII Auto Grouping, which consisted of a command, an auto group, a railway group, and a depot. On 1 November 1926, the grouping was disbanded and the next day its personnel and vehicles were used to form the 7th Automobilistic Center in Florence. The center consisted of a command, the VII Automobilistic Group, and a depot. The three companies of the disbanded railway group were assigned to the 19th Field Artillery Regiment, 21st Field Artillery Regiment, and 29th Field Artillery Regiment.

In 1935-36, the center mobilized the 7th Heavy Auto Group with an attached workshop, the 4th Auto Grouping, and five auto units for the Second Italo-Ethiopian War.

=== World War II ===
On 1 July 1942, the 7th Automobilistic Center was renamed 7th Drivers Regiment. In the evening of 8 September 1943, the Armistice of Cassibile, which ended hostilities between the Kingdom of Italy and the Anglo-American Allies, was announced by General Dwight D. Eisenhower on Radio Algiers and by Marshal Pietro Badoglio on Italian radio. Germany reacted by invading Italy and the 7th Drivers Regiment was disbanded soon thereafter by German forces. During World War II the center mobilized in its depot in Naples among others the following units:

- 17th Heavy Auto Group
- 18th Heavy Auto Group
- 26th Mixed Auto Group
- 16th Roadside Assistance Unit
- 131st Roadside Assistance Unit
- 2nd Heavy Mobile Workshop
- 12th Heavy Mobile Workshop

=== Cold War ===
On 1 February 1947, the 7th Drivers Center was formed in Florence, which consisted of a command, the 7th Auto Unit, the 7th Vehicles Park, a fuel depot, and a depot. The center supported the VII Territorial Military Command of the Tuscan-Emilian Military Region. On 1 March 1949, the 7th Vehicles Park was transferred to the 7th Automotive Repair Shop. In 1957, the 6th Drivers Center in Bologna was disbanded and the 7th Drivers Center became responsible for the entire Tuscan-Emilian Military Region. The unit was tasked with the transport of fuel, ammunition, and materiel between the military region's depots and the logistic supply points of the army's divisions and brigades. On 31 December 1964, the 7th Drivers Center was disbanded. The next day the 7th Auto Unit became an autonomous unit and was assigned to the VII Territorial Military Command.

As part of the 1975 army reform the 7th Auto Unit was renamed 7th Mixed Maneuver Auto Unit.

=== Recent times ===
On 15 April 1991, the 7th Mixed Maneuver Auto Unit was reorganized and renamed 7th Transport Battalion "Monte Amiata". Transport battalions formed after the 1986 army reform were named after a landmark mountain in the military region's area of operations; in case of the 7th Transport Battalion for the Monte Amiata. On 8 November 1991, the President of the Italian Republic Francesco Cossiga granted the battalion a flag and assigned the battalion the traditions of the 7th Drivers Regiment. At the time the battalion consisted of a command, a command and services company, a mixed transport company, and a special transports company.

On 30 June 1998, the 7th Transport Battalion "Monte Amiata" was disbanded and the battalion's flag transferred to the Shrine of the Flags in the Vittoriano in Rome for safekeeping.

== See also ==
- Military logistics
