= Joint Forces Maneuver Regiment (Italy) =

Active Italian Army transport unit

- Reggimento di Manovra Interforze
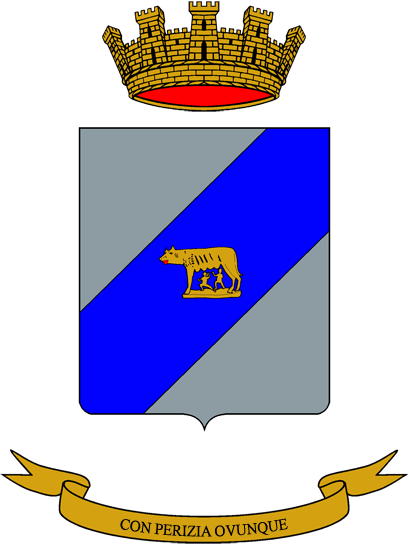
- Regimental coat of arms
- Active: 1 Jan. 2004 — today
- Country: Italy
- Branch: Italian Armed Forces
- Role: Military logistics
- Part of: Defense General Staff
- Garrison/HQ: Rome
- Motto(s): "Con perizia ovunque"
- Anniversaries: 22 May 1916 - Battle of Asiago

Insignia
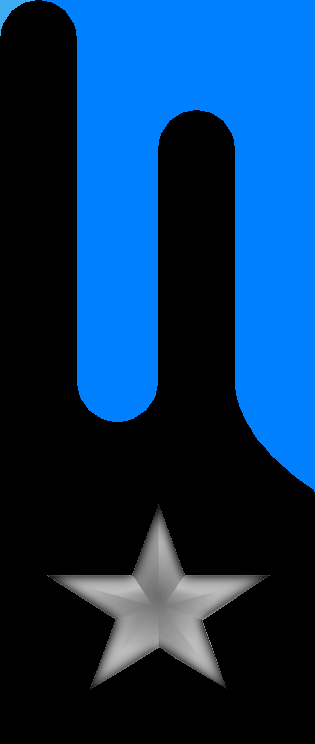
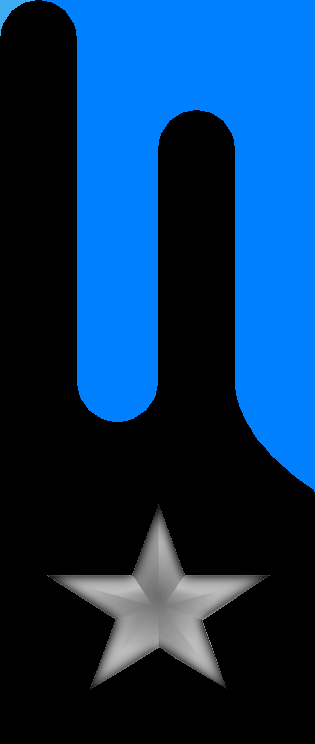
- Unit gorget patches

The Joint Forces Maneuver Regiment (Italian: Reggimento di Manovra Interforze) is a military logistics regiment of the Italian Armed Forces based in Rome. The regiment is assigned to the Defense General Staff and provides transport to the Defense General Staff and the Italian Ministry of Defense. The regiment's anniversary falls, as for all units of the Italian Army's Transport and Materiel Corps, on 22 May, the anniversary of the Royal Italian Army's first major use of automobiles to transport reinforcements to the Asiago plateau to counter the Austro-Hungarian Asiago Offensive in May 1916.

== History ==
In 1946, the Auto Unit of the War Ministry was formed by expanding the existing war ministry's Administrative Transport Company. On 1 January 1948, the unit was expanded to Auto Group of the Defense Ministry-Army, which consisted of a command, a car auto unit, a mixed auto unit, and the 13th Light Workshop. On 1 May 1958, the group was renamed X Auto Group. In 1966, the group was expanded and afterwards consisted of four auto units.

On 1 August 1976, as part of the 1975 army reform, the X Auto Group was renamed 10th Maneuver Auto Group. On 1 October 1976, the group was renamed 10th Joint Forces Maneuver Auto Group "Salaria". Like all Italian Army transport units the group was named for a historic road near its base, in case of the 10th Joint Forces Maneuver Auto Group for the Roman road Via Salaria, which connected Rome and Porto d'Ascoli.

On 12 November 1976, the President of the Italian Republic Giovanni Leone granted with decree 846 the group a flag.

On 1 January 2004, the group was renamed 10th Transport Battalion "Salaria" and entered the newly formed Joint Forces Maneuver Regiment, which became a joint unit of the Italian Armed Forces, even though the regiment's personnel continues to be drawn from the army's Transport and Material Arm.

== Organization ==
As of 2024 the Joint Forces Maneuver Regiment is organized as follows:

- Joint Forces Maneuver Regiment, in Rome
  - Command and Logistic Support Company
  - 10th Transport Battalion "Salaria"
    - 1st Transport Company
    - 2nd Transport Company
    - 3rd Transport Company
    - Maintenance Company

== See also ==
- Military logistics
