= Logistic Battalion "Mameli" =

Inactive Italian Army brigade logistics unit

- Battaglione Logistico "Mameli"
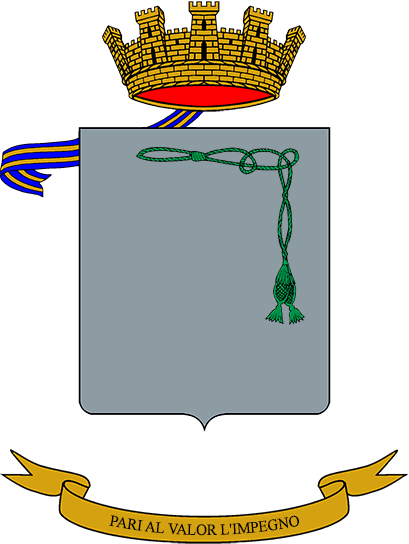
- Battalion coat of arms
- Active: 1 Oct. 1975 — 31 March 1991
- Country: Italy
- Branch: Italian Army
- Type: Military logistics
- Part of: Armored Brigade "Mameli"
- Garrison/HQ: Vacile
- Motto(s): "Pari al valor l'impegno"
- Anniversaries: 22 May 1916 - Battle of Asiago
- Decorations: 1× Bronze Medal of Army Valor

Insignia
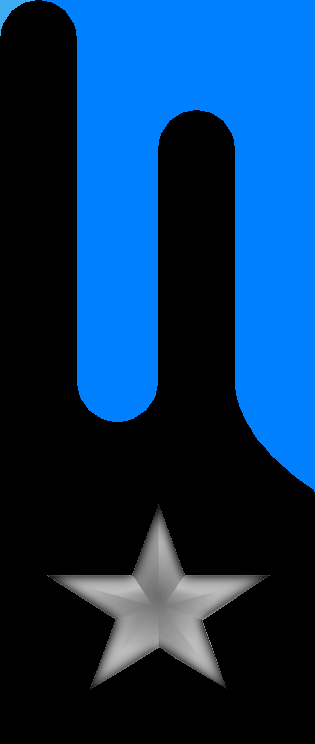
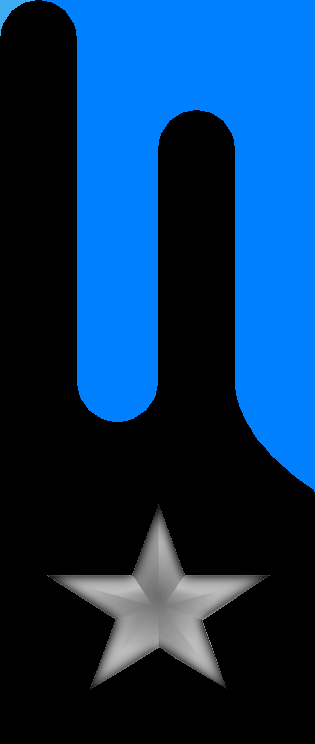
- Unit gorget patches

The Logistic Battalion "Mameli" (Italian: Battaglione Logistico "Mameli") is an inactive military logistics battalion of the Italian Army, which was assigned to the Armored Brigade "Mameli". The battalion's anniversary falls, as for all units of the Italian Army's Transport and Materiel Corps, on 22 May, the anniversary of the Royal Italian Army's first major use of automobiles to transport reinforcements to the Asiago plateau to counter the Austro-Hungarian Asiago Offensive in May 1916.

== History ==
=== Cold War ===
In 1963, the Italian Army reorganized its armored divisions along NATO standards and added a brigade level to the divisions' organization. As part of the reorganization the Armored Division "Ariete" formed a services battalion for each of its three brigades. On 1 April 1964, the II Services Battalion "Ariete" was formed in Cordenons. The battalion became operational in 1965 and was assigned to the II Armored Brigade "Ariete".

Initially the battalion consisted of a command, a command platoon, an auto unit, a mobile workshop, a mixed services platoon, and provisions team. On 1 January 1966, the battalion was reorganized and consisted afterwards of a command, a command company, an auto unit, a medical company, and a Resupply, Repairs, Recovery Unit. On 30 September 1968, the division's three brigade headquarters were disbanded and the next day, on 1 October 1968, the II Services Battalion "Ariete" was assigned to the division's Services Grouping Command "Ariete".

As part of the 1975 army reform the Armored Division "Ariete" was reorganized and three new brigades were formed with the division's units: on 1 October 1975, the 32nd Armored Brigade "Mameli" and on 1 November 1975, the 8th Mechanized Brigade "Garibaldi" and 132nd Armored Brigade "Manin". On 1 October 1975, the II Services Battalion "Ariete" was renamed Logistic Battalion "Mameli" and assigned to the 32nd Mechanized Brigade "Mameli". Soon thereafter the battalion moved from Cordenons to Vacile.

Initially the battalion consisted of a command, a command platoon, and a supply and transport company, a medium workshop, and a vehicle park. At the time the battalion fielded 692 men (38 officers, 85 non-commissioned officers, and 569 soldiers).

On 12 November 1976, the President of the Italian Republic Giovanni Leone granted with decree 846 the battalion a flag.

For its conduct and work after the 1976 Friuli earthquake the battalion was awarded a Bronze Medal of Army Valor, which was affixed to the battalion's flag and added to the battalion's coat of arms.

On 24 June 1981, the battalion added a reserve medical unit. On 1 January of the same year, the battalion was reorganized and consisted afterwards of the following units:

- Logistic Battalion "Mameli", in Vacile
  - Command and Services Company
  - Supply Company
  - Maintenance Company
  - Medium Transport Company
  - Medical Unit (Reserve)

=== Recent times ===
After the end of the Cold War the Italian Army began to draw down its forces. Consequently, on 31 March 1991, the Logistic Battalion "Mameli" was disbanded, followed by the Armored Brigade "Mameli", which was disbanded the following day. On 8 May of the same year, the battalion's flag was transferred to the Shrine of the Flags in the Vittoriano in Rome for safekeeping.

== See also ==
- Military logistics
