= 14th Transport Battalion "Flavia" =

Inactive Italian Army transport unit

- 14° Battaglione Trasporti "Flavia"
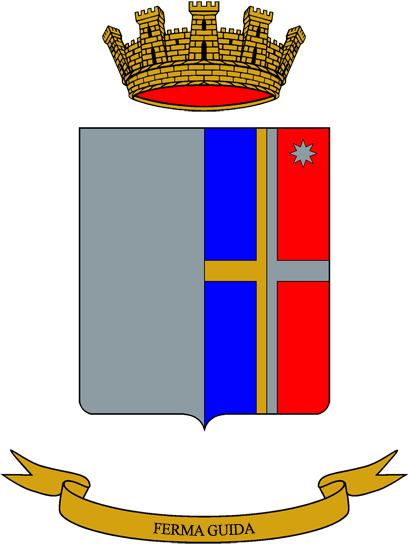
- Battalion coat of arms
- Active: 1 Oct. 1976 — 30 June 1998
- Country: Italy
- Branch: Italian Army
- Role: Military logistics
- Garrison/HQ: Montorio Veronese
- Motto: "Ferma guida"
- Anniversaries: 22 May 1916 - Battle of Asiago

Insignia
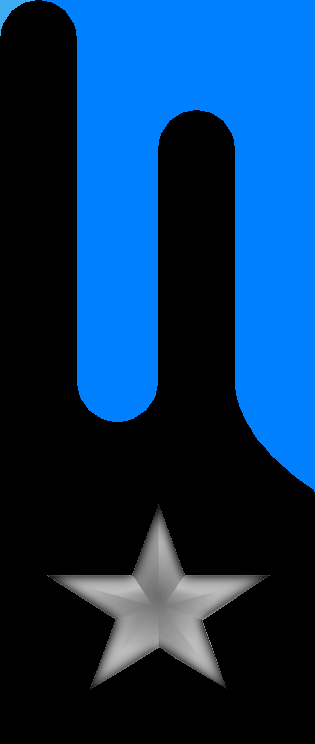
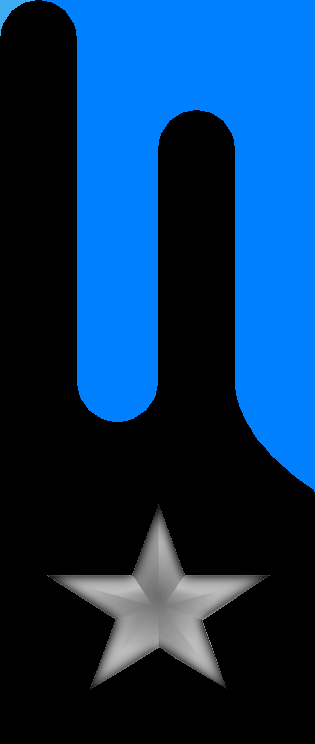
- Unit gorget patches

The 14th Transport Battalion "Flavia" (Italian: 14° Battaglione Trasporti "Flavia") is an inactive military logistics battalion of the Italian Army, which was based in Montorio Veronese in Veneto. Originally a transport regiment of the Royal Italian Army, the unit was last active from 1976 to 1998. The battalion's anniversary falls, as for all units of the Italian Army's Transport and Materiel Corps, on 22 May, the anniversary of the Royal Italian Army's first major use of automobiles to transport reinforcements to the Asiago plateau to counter the Austro-Hungarian Asiago Offensive in May 1916.

== History ==
=== World War II ===
On 15 February 1940, the 14th Automobilistic Center was formed in Treviso and assigned to the XIV Army Corps. The center consisted of a command, the XIV Automobilistic Group, and a depot. On 1 July 1942, the 14th Automobilistic Center was renamed 14th Drivers Regiment. In the evening of 8 September 1943, the Armistice of Cassibile, which ended hostilities between the Kingdom of Italy and the Anglo-American Allies, was announced by General Dwight D. Eisenhower on Radio Algiers and by Marshal Pietro Badoglio on Italian radio. Germany reacted by invading Italy and the 14th Drivers Regiment was disbanded soon thereafter by German forces. During World War II the center mobilized in its depot in Treviso among others the following units:

- 25th Mixed Auto Group
- 14th Roadside Assistance Unit
- 13th Auto Workshop
- 18th Heavy Mobile Workshop
- 38th Heavy Mobile Workshop
- 43rd Heavy Mobile Workshop
- 63rd Heavy Mobile Workshop

=== Cold War ===
On 30 June 1969, the 16th Mixed Territorial Auto Unit in Verona was disbanded and the next day its personnel and materiel were used to form the V Territorial Auto Group. The group was assigned to the V Army Corps and consisted of a command, a command unit, the 15th Mixed Auto Unit, the 16th Mixed Auto Unit, and a cars and autobus auto section. On 18 November of the same year, the group moved from Verona to Montorio Veronese.

On 1 August 1976, as part of the 1975 army reform, the V Territorial Auto Group was renamed 5th Maneuver Auto Group. On 1 October 1976, the group was renamed 14th Maneuver Auto Group "Flavia". Like all Italian Army transport units the group was named for a historic road near its base, in case of the 14th Maneuver Auto Group for the Roman road Via Flavia, which connected Trieste with the cities along the Dalmatian coast.

On 12 November 1976, the President of the Italian Republic Giovanni Leone granted with decree 846 the group a flag and assigned the group the traditions of the 14th Drivers Regiment.

=== Recent times ===
On 1 April 1991, the 14th Maneuver Auto Group "Flavia" was reorganized and renamed 14th Transport Battalion "Flavia". The battalion consisted now of a command, a command and services company, a mixed transport company, and a special transports company.

On 5 November 1996, the 14th Transport Battalion "Flavia" and the 5th Maneuver Logistic Battalion "Euganeo" in Treviso were disbanded. The next day the personnel and materiel of the two battalions were used to form the 14th Military Region Logistic Unit "Flavia" in Montorio Veronese. The new unit consisted of a command, a command and services company, a transport battalion, and a movement control, and convoy escort company. The transport battalion fielded a mixed transport company, a special transport company, and a maintenance company.

On 30 June 1998, the 14th Military Region Logistic Unit "Flavia" was disbanded and the flag of the 14th Transport Battalion "Flavia" transferred to the Shrine of the Flags in the Vittoriano in Rome for safekeeping.

== See also ==
- Military logistics
