= Logistic Battalion "Tridentina" =

Inactive Italian Army mountain logistics unit

- Battaglione Logistico "Tridentina"
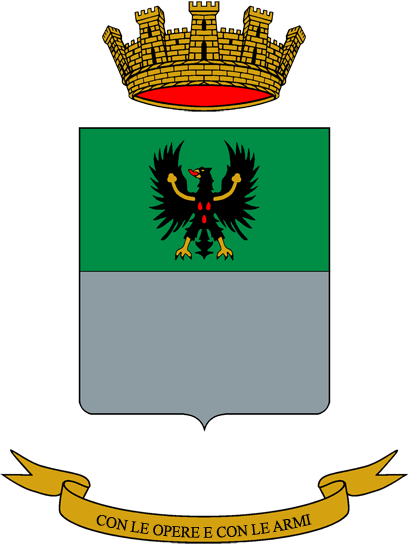
- Battalion coat of arms
- Active: 1 March 1976 – Aug. 2002
- Country: Italy
- Branch: Italian Army
- Type: Military logistics
- Part of: Alpine Brigade "Tridentina"
- Garrison/HQ: Elvas
- Motto(s): "Con le opere e con le armi"
- Anniversaries: 22 May 1916 – Battle of Asiago

Insignia
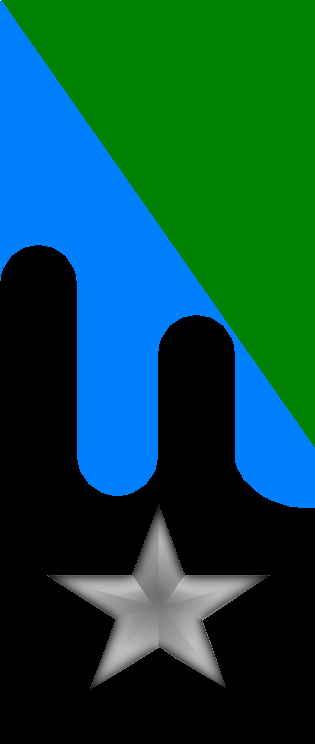
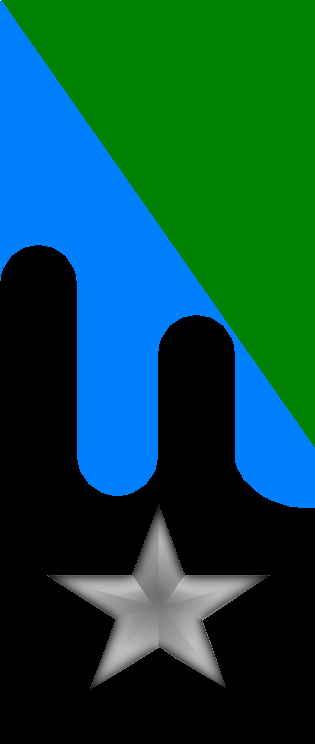
- Unit gorget patches

The Logistic Battalion "Tridentina" (Italian: Battaglione Logistico "Tridentina") is an inactive military logistics battalion of the Italian Army, which was assigned to the Alpine Brigade "Tridentina". As an alpine unit the battalion is associated with the army's mountain infantry speciality, the Alpini, with whom the battalion shares the distinctive Cappello Alpino. The battalion's anniversary falls, as for all units of the Italian Army's Transport and Materiel Corps, on 22 May, the anniversary of the Royal Italian Army's first major use of automobiles to transport reinforcements to the Asiago plateau to counter the Austro-Hungarian Asiago Offensive in May 1916.

== History ==
=== Cold War ===
The battalion is the spiritual successor of the logistic units of the 2nd Alpine Division "Tridentina", which had fought in the Greco-Italian War and the Italian campaign in the Soviet Union of World War II, and of the logistic units of the Alpine Brigade "Tridentina", which was formed on 1 May 1951 in Brixen.

On 1 December 1956, the Service Units Command "Tridentina" was formed in Vahrn, which consisted of the 56th Medical Section, the 56th Provisions Section, a mobile vehicle park, a mobile workshop, and an auto unit. At a later date the command also received the 106th Field Hospital. On 1 November 1961, the mobile vehicle park and mobile workshop merged to form the Resupply, Repairs, Recovery Unit "Tridentina".

On 1 January 1967, the Service Units Command "Tridentina" was reorganized as Services Grouping Command "Tridentina", which consisted of a command, the Auto Unit "Tridentina", the 56th Provisions Section, the Resupply, Repairs, Recovery Unit "Tridentina", the 56th Medical Section, and the 106th Field Hospital. On 1 May 1973, the 56th Medical Section and 106th Field Hospital entered the newly formed Medical Battalion "Tridentina".

On 1 March 1976, as part of the 1975 army reform, the Services Grouping Command "Tridentina" was reorganized as Logistic Battalion "Tridentina". Initially the battalion consisted of a command, a command and services platoon, two light logistic units, a medium logistic unit, and two reserve medical units. At the time the battalion fielded 712 men (42 officers, 92 non-commissioned officers, and 588 soldiers). On 12 November 1976, the President of the Italian Republic Giovanni Leone granted with decree 846 the battalion a flag.

In 1981, the two medical units merged into a single reserve medical unit. On 1 January 1982, the battalion was reorganized and consisted afterwards of the following units:

- Logistic Battalion "Tridentina", in Vahrn
  - Command and Services Company
  - Supply Company
  - Maintenance Company
  - Medium Transport Company
  - Medical Unit (Reserve)

=== Recent times ===
In 1991, the battalion moved from Vahrn to Elvas. In August 2002, the Logistic Battalion "Tridentina" was disbanded, followed, on 31 December 2002, by the Alpine Brigade "Tridentina". Afterwards the battalion's flag was transferred to the Shrine of the Flags in the Vittoriano in Rome for safekeeping.

== See also ==
- Military logistics
