= 3rd Army Corps Auto Group "Fulvia" =

Inactive Italian Army transport unit

- 3° Autogruppo di Corpo d'Armata "Fulvia"
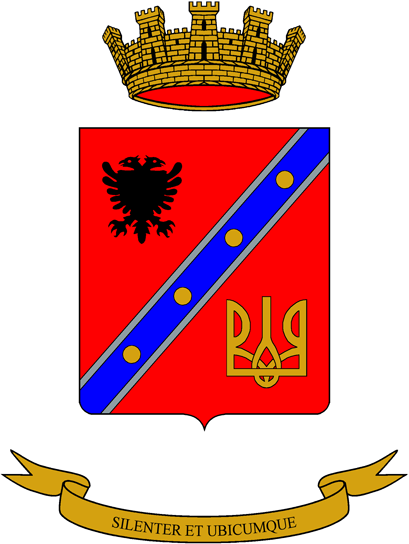
- Group coat of arms
- Active: 1 Oct. 1976 — 30 June 1982
- Country: Italy
- Branch: Italian Army
- Role: Military logistics
- Part of: 3rd Army Corps
- Garrison/HQ: Milan
- Motto: "Silenter er ubicumque"
- Anniversaries: 22 May 1916 - Battle of Asiago

Insignia
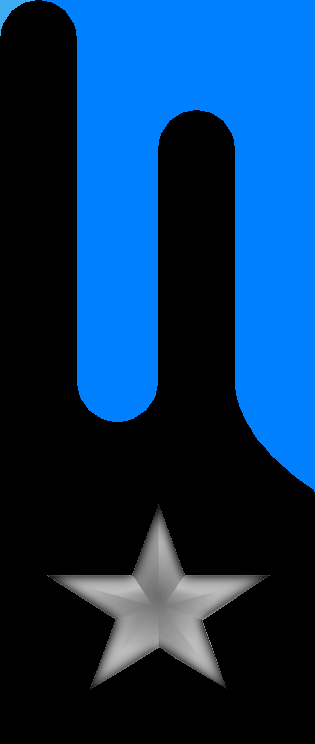
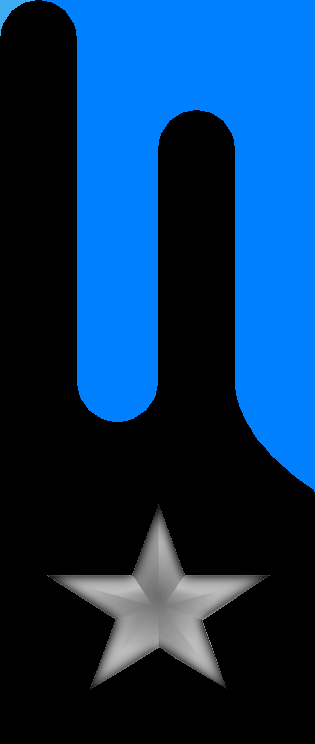
- Unit gorget patches

The 3rd Army Corps Auto Group "Fulvia" (Italian: 3° Autogruppo di Corpo d'Armata "Fulvia") is an inactive military logistics battalion of the Italian Army, which was based in Milan in Lombardy. Originally a transport regiment of the Royal Italian Army, the unit was last active from 1976 to 1982. The group's anniversary falls, as for all units of the Italian Army's Transport and Materiel Corps, on 22 May, the anniversary of the Royal Italian Army's first major use of automobiles to transport reinforcements to the Asiago plateau to counter the Austro-Hungarian Asiago Offensive in May 1916.

== History ==
=== Interwar years ===
In August 1920, the II Automobilistic Center was formed in Milan and assigned to the II Army Corps. In 1923, the center was disbanded and its personnel and materiel used to form the II Auto Grouping, which consisted of a command, an auto group, a railway group, and a depot. On 1 November 1926, the grouping was disbanded and the next day its personnel and vehicles were used to form the 3rd Automobilistic Center. The center consisted of a command, the III Automobilistic Group, and a depot. The three companies of the disbanded railway group were assigned to the 17th Field Artillery Regiment, 27th Field Artillery Regiment, 30th Field Artillery Regiment.

In 1935-36, the center mobilized for the Second Italo-Ethiopian War for service in Eritrea the 300th Light Auto Unit, the 306th Special Auto Unit, which was assigned to the 27th Infantry Division "Sila", the 314th Auto Unit with Lancia R.O. trucks, the 315th Trucks Auto Unit, and the 320th Ambulances Auto Unit. For service in Somalia the center mobilized the 302nd Mixed Auto Unit, the 303rd Mixed Auto Unit, the 309th Ambulances Auto Unit, and the 327th Heavy Auto Unit. On 16 January 1936, the center formed the XXIII Auto Group for the 8th Infantry Division "Po".

=== World War II ===
On 1 July 1942, the 3rd Automobilistic Center was renamed 3rd Drivers Regiment. In the evening of 8 September 1943, the Armistice of Cassibile, which ended hostilities between the Kingdom of Italy and the Anglo-American Allies, was announced by General Dwight D. Eisenhower on Radio Algiers and by Marshal Pietro Badoglio on Italian radio. Germany reacted by invading Italy and the 3rd Drivers Regiment was disbanded soon thereafter by German forces. During World War II the center mobilized in its depot in Milan among others the following units:

- 3rd Auto Grouping Command
- 9th Auto Grouping Command
- 14th Auto Grouping Command
- I Heavy Auto Group
- XX Heavy Auto Group
- XXIX Heavy Auto Group
- XXX Heavy Auto Group
- LII Heavy Auto Group
- LII Autobus Auto Group
- LVII Heavy Auto Group
- LX Heavy Auto Group
- CXXIV Heavy Auto Group
- II Reserve Auto Group
- VIII Reserve Auto Group
- IX Reserve Auto Group
- X Reserve Auto Group
- XI Reserve Auto Group
- 48 × auto units, including:
  - 122nd Light Auto Unit for the 3rd Cavalry Division "Principe Amedeo Duca d'Aosta"

=== Cold War ===
On 26 February 1947, the 3rd Drivers Center was formed in Milan, which consisted of a command, the 3rd Auto Unit, the 3rd Vehicles Park, a fuel depot, and a depot. The center supported the III Territorial Military Command of the Northwestern Military Region. The unit was tasked with the transport of fuel, ammunition, and materiel between the military region's depots and the logistic supply points of the army's divisions and brigades. On 1 March 1949, the 3rd Vehicles Park was transferred to the 3rd Automotive Repair Shop. On 1 June 1953, the center added the newly formed III Auto Group, which incorporated the center's 3rd Auto Unit. The III Auto Group consisted of a command, the 1st Auto Unit, the 2nd Auto Unit (the former 3rd Auto Unit), and two light workshops.

On 30 June 1957, the 3rd Drivers Center was disbanded. The next day the III Territorial Military Command was reorganized as III Army Corps and the III Auto Group was renamed III Army Corps Auto Group and assigned to the newly formed corps. At the time the III Auto Group consisted of a command, the 1st Mixed Auto Unit, the 2nd Mixed Auto Unit, and a light workshop.

On 1 October 1976, as part of the 1975 army reform, the 3rd Army Corps Auto Group was renamed 3rd Army Corps Auto Group "Fulvia". The group consisted of a command, a command unit, and two mixed auto units. Like all Italian Army transport units the group was named for a historic road near its base, in case of the 3rd Army Corps Auto Group for the Roman road Via Fulvia, which connected Tortona and Turin.

On 12 November 1976, the President of the Italian Republic Giovanni Leone granted with decree 846 the group a flag and assigned the group the traditions of the 3rd Drivers Regiment.

On 30 June 1982, the 3rd Army Corps Auto Group "Fulvia" was disbanded and the group's 1st Mixed Auto Unit and 2nd Mixed Auto Unit were transferred to the 3rd Maneuver Logistic Battalion in Milan. The two units were reorganized into a medium transport company and a mixed transport company. On 15 December 1982, the group's flag was transferred to the Shrine of the Flags in the Vittoriano in Rome for safekeeping.

== See also ==
- Military logistics
