= Logistic Regiment "Pozzuolo del Friuli" =

Active Italian Army brigade logistics unit

- Reggimento Logistico "Pozzuolo del Friuli"
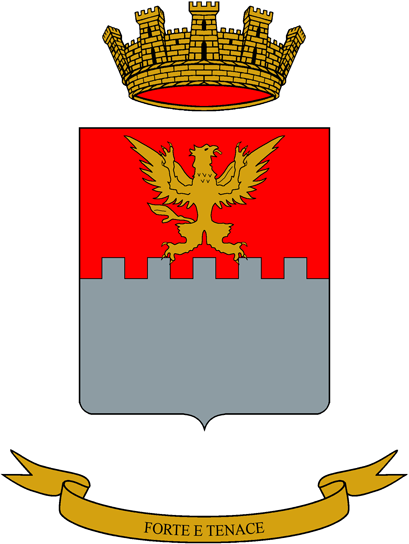
- Regimental coat of arms
- Active: 1 Aug. 1976 — today
- Country: Italy
- Branch: Italian Army
- Role: Military logistics
- Part of: Cavalry Brigade "Pozzuolo del Friuli"
- Garrison/HQ: Remanzacco
- Motto(s): "Forte e tenace"
- Anniversaries: 22 May 1916 - Battle of Asiago
- Decorations: 2× Silver Crosses of Army Merit

Insignia
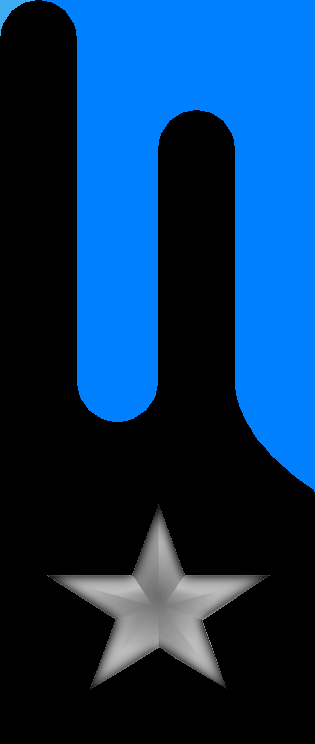
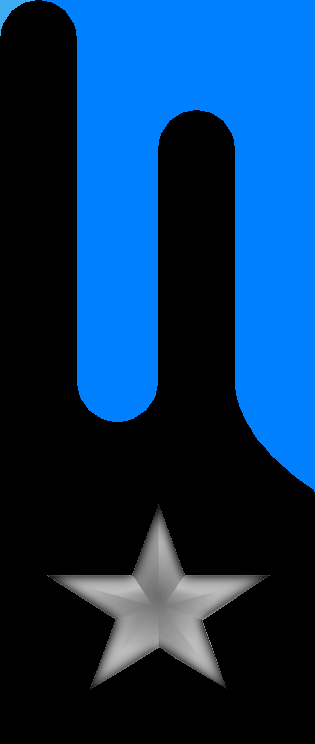
- Unit gorget patches

The Logistic Regiment "Pozzuolo del Friuli" (Italian: Reggimento Logistico "Pozzuolo del Friuli") is a military logistics regiment of the Italian Army based in Remanzacco in Friuli-Venezia Giulia. The battalion was formed in 1976 as Logistic Battalion "Mantova" and assigned to the Mechanized Division "Mantova". After the division was disbanded in 1986 the battalion was reorganized as a corps logistic battalion, renamed 8th Maneuver Logistic Battalion "Carso" and assigned to the 5th Army Corps. In 1994, the battalion was reorganized as 8th Maneuver Logistic Regiment "Carso". Today the regiment is the logistic unit of the Cavalry Brigade "Pozzuolo del Friuli". The regiment's anniversary falls, as for all units of the Italian Army's Transport and Materiel Corps, on 22 May, the anniversary of the Royal Italian Army's first major use of automobiles to transport reinforcements to the Asiago plateau to counter the Austro-Hungarian Asiago Offensive in May 1916.

== History ==
=== World War II ===
The battalion is the spiritual successor of the logistic units of the Royal Italian Army's 104th Infantry Division "Mantova", which was formed on 15 March 1942 in Verona. The "Mantova" division remained in Piedmont until January 1943 when it was transferred to Nicastro in Calabria.

In the evening of 8 September 1943, the Armistice of Cassibile, which ended hostilities between the Kingdom of Italy and the Anglo-American Allies, was announced by General Dwight D. Eisenhower on Radio Algiers and by Marshal Pietro Badoglio on Italian radio. The Germans reacted to the armistice by invading Italy, while the "Mantova" division remained loyal to King Victor Emmanuel III and joined the Italian Co-belligerent Army. In fall 1944, the "Mantova" division was reorganized as Combat Group "Mantova". The combat group completed its reorganization and joined the Italian campaign of World War II just as the German forces in Italy surrendered. After the war, on 15 October 1945, the Combat Group "Mantova" was reorganized and renamed Infantry Division "Mantova".

=== Cold War ===
The Infantry Division "Mantova" was based in Varazze in Liguria until May 1947. The division then moved to the Udine in Italy's Northeast. On 1 November 1956, the logistic units of the division were assigned to the newly formed Service Units Command "Mantova", which was based in Udine. The command consisted of a medical section, a provisions section, a mobile vehicle park, a mobile workshop, an auto unit, and the 9th Field Hospital. On 1 January 1962 the mobile vehicle park, mobile workshop, and the light workshops of the division's regiments merged to form the Resupply, Repairs, Recovery Unit "Mantova".

On 1 January 1972 the Service Units Command "Mantova" in Udine was reorganized as Services Grouping Command "Mantova". The command now consisted of a command, the Auto Unit "Mantova", the Provisions Company "Mantova", the Resupply, Repairs, Recovery Unit "Mantova", and the Medical Battalion "Mantova", which consisted of the 9th Field Hospital and a medical company.

As part of the 1975 army reform the units of the Infantry Division "Mantova" were reorganized. On 1 August 1976, the Services Grouping Command "Mantova" was reduced to Logistic Battalion "Mantova", which received the traditions of all preceding logistic, transport, medical, maintenance, and supply units bearing the name "Mantova". The battalion was the divisional logistics unit of the Mechanized Division "Mantova" and consisted of a command, a command platoon, a supply and transport company, a medium workshop, and a vehicle park. At the time the battalion fielded 472 men (21 officers, 66 non-commissioned officers, and 385 soldiers).

On 12 November 1976, the President of the Italian Republic Giovanni Leone granted with decree 846 the battalion a flag.

On 10 November 1980, the battalion was reorganized and renamed Maneuver Logistic Battalion "Mantova". Afterwards the battalion consisted of the following units:

- Maneuver Logistic Battalion "Mantova", in Udine
  - Command and Services Company
  - Supply Company
  - Maintenance Company
  - Medium Transport Company
  - Mixed Transport Company

In 1981, the battalion moved from Udine to Remanzacco.

In 1986, the Italian Army abolished the divisional level and brigades, which until then had been under one of the Army's four divisions, came under direct command of the Army's 3rd Army Corps or 5th Army Corps. As the Mechanized Division "Mantova" carried the traditions of the 104th Infantry Division "Mantova" and Combat Group "Mantova", which had both fought against the Germans during the Italian campaign of World War II, the army decided to retain the name of the division. On 30 September 1986, the command of the Mechanized Division "Mantova" in Udine was disbanded and the next day the command of the Mechanized Brigade "Isonzo" moved from Cividale del Friuli to Udine, where the command was renamed Mechanized Brigade "Mantova". The "Mantova" brigade retained the Isonzo's units, which changed their names from "Isonzo" to "Mantova" on the same date.

Furthermore, on the same date, 1 October 1986, the Maneuver Logistic Battalion "Mantova" was assigned to the Support Units Command of the 5th Army Corps. As there existed now the "Mantova" brigade's Logistic Battalion "Mantova" and the disbanded division's Maneuver Logistic Battalion "Mantova", the army decided to rename the latter. On 1 November 1986, the Maneuver Logistic Battalion "Mantova" was renamed 8th Maneuver Logistic Battalion "Carso". As per army naming convention for logistic units supporting corps-level commands the battalion was named for a geographic feature in the corps' area of operations; in case of the 8th Maneuver Logistic Battalion for the Karst plateau (Italian: Carso).

=== Recent times ===
From 17 September 1991 to 11 June 1992, the battalion operated a logistic center and a medical point in Durrës in Albania to distribute aid to the local population. For its conduct and work in Durrës the battalion was awarded a Silver Cross of Army Merit, which was affixed to the battalion's flag.

On 4 September 1994, the 8th Maneuver Logistic Battalion "Carso" lost its autonomy and the next day the battalion entered the newly formed 8th Maneuver Logistic Regiment "Carso". At the same time the battalion also incorporated the 52nd Medical Unit (Reserve).

On 7 May 2001, the regiment joined the Logistic Projection Brigade. On 27 July 2001, the regiment was reorganized and renamed 8th Transport Regiment. The regiment consisted of a command, a command and logistic support company, a transport battalion, and a movement control battalion. On 12 September 2013, the Logistic Projection Command was disbanded and the 8th Transport Regiment was assigned to the 132nd Armored Brigade "Ariete". On 1 July 2015, the regiment was transferred to the Cavalry Brigade "Pozzuolo del Friuli", renamed Logistic Regiment "Pozzuolo del Friuli", and reorganized as a brigade logistic regiment. For its conduct and work during the COVID-19 pandemic the regiment was awarded in 2022 a Silver Cross of Army Merit, which was affixed to the regiment's flag.

== Organization ==
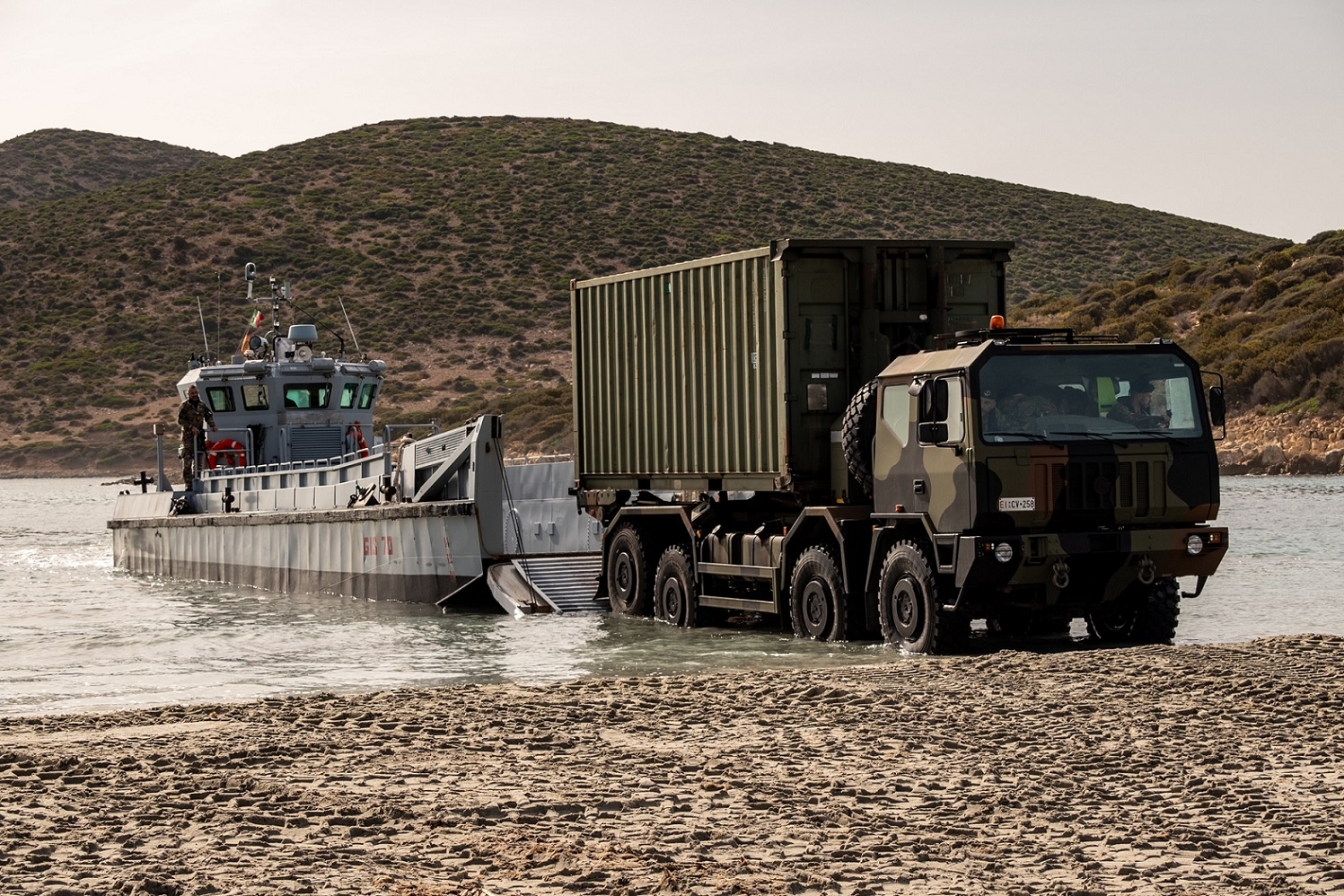
Italian Army - Logistic Regiment "Pozzuolo del Friuli" ACTL 8x8 truck disembarking from an Italian Navy LCM62-class landing craft during exercise Mare Aperto 24/1 in Capo Teulada

As of 2024 the Logistic Regiment "Pozzuolo del Friuli" is organized as follows:

- Logistic Regiment "Pozzuolo del Friuli", in Remanzacco
  - Command and Logistic Support Company
  - Logistic Battalion
    - Transport Company
    - Maintenance Company
    - Supply Company

== See also ==
- Military logistics
