= Logistic Regiment "Folgore" =

Active Italian Army brigade logistics unit

- Reggimento Logistico "Folgore"
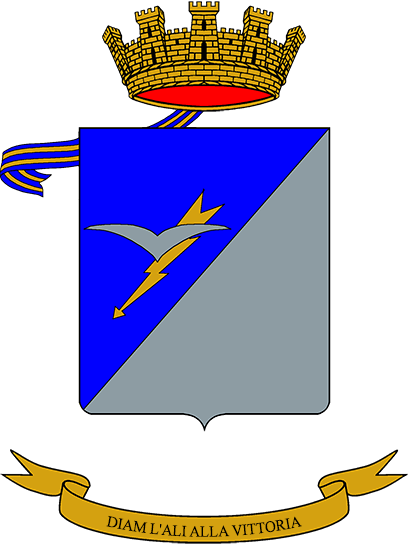
- Regimental coat of arms
- Active: 1 Oct. 1975 — today
- Country: Italy
- Branch: Italian Army
- Role: Military logistics
- Part of: Paratroopers Brigade "Folgore"
- Garrison/HQ: Pisa
- Motto(s): "Diam l'ali alla vittoria"
- Anniversaries: 22 May 1916 - Battle of Asiago
- Decorations: 1× Bronze Medal of Army Valor; 1× Silver Cross of Army Merit; 1× Bronze Cross of Army Merit

Insignia
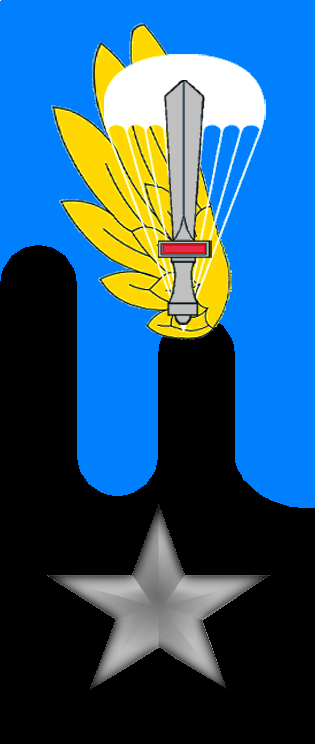
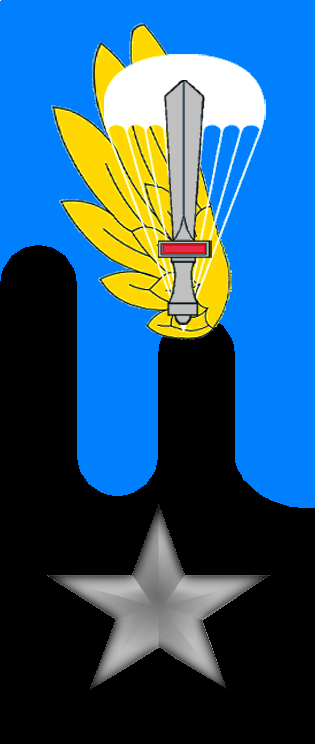
- Unit gorget patches

The Logistic Regiment "Folgore" (Italian: Reggimento Logistico "Folgore") is a military logistics regiment of the Italian Army based in Pisa in Tuscany. Today the regiment is the logistic unit of the Paratroopers Brigade "Folgore". The regiment's anniversary falls, as for all units of the Italian Army's Transport and Materiel Corps, on 22 May, the anniversary of the Royal Italian Army's first major use of automobiles to transport reinforcements to the Asiago plateau to counter the Austro-Hungarian Asiago Offensive in May 1916.

== History ==
=== World War II ===
The battalion is the spiritual successor of the logistic units of the Royal Italian Army's 185th Infantry Division "Folgore", which fought in the Western Desert campaign in North Africa. After participating in the First Battle of El Alamein, the division fought in the Battle of Alam el Halfa and was destroyed during the Second Battle of El Alamein.

=== Cold War ===
On 1 January 1963, the Italian Army raised the Paratroopers Brigade in Pisa, which, on 10 June 1967, was renamed Paratroopers Brigade "Folgore".

As part of the 1975 army reform the logistic units of the Paratroopers Brigade "Folgore" were reorganized: on 1 October 1975, the Air-supplies Company "Folgore" in Pisa and the Maintenance Company "Folgore" in Livorno merged to form the Paratroopers Logistic Battalion "Folgore" in Pisa. The new battalion consisted of a command, a command platoon, a supply and transport company, a maintenance and air-supplies company, a medium workshop, and a vehicle park. At the time the battalion fielded 832 men (43 officers, 104 non-commissioned officers, and 685 soldiers).

On 12 November 1976, the President of the Italian Republic Giovanni Leone granted with decree 846 the battalion a flag.

In 1981, the battalion was reorganized and consisted then of the following units:

- Paratroopers Logistic Battalion "Folgore", in Pisa
  - Command and Services Company
  - Supply Company
  - Maintenance Company
  - Maintenance and Air-supplies Company
  - Medium Transport Company
  - Medical Unit (Reserve)

From 12 October 1982 to 26 February 1984, the battalion provided personnel and materiel for the Multinational Force in Lebanon peacekeeping force. On 1 August 1986, the Maintenance and Air Supplies Company was transferred to the Military Parachuting School.

On 31 October 1986, the Mechanized Division "Folgore" was disbanded and the next day, 1 November 1986, the disbanded division's Maneuver Logistic Battalion "Folgore" was renamed 5th Maneuver Logistic Battalion "Euganeo". Afterwards the traditions of all preceding logistic, transport, medical, maintenance, and supply units bearing the name "Folgore" were transferred to the Paratroopers Logistic Battalion "Folgore".

=== Recent times ===
In May 1991, personnel of the battalion was deployed to Northern Iraq for Operation Provide Comfort. After arriving in Zakho the personnel formed the Logistic Support Unit "Folgore", which consisted of a command and signals platoon, a maintenance company, a supply company, and a transport company. In total about 200 men served in Zakho before returning to Italy in July 1991.

From 27 December 1992 to 28 October 1993, the battalion participated in the Unified Task Force in Somalia. In Balad the battalion operated a logistics center and a medical post to support the local population. For its conduct and work in Somalia the battalion was awarded a Silver Cross of Army Merit, which was affixed to the battalion's flag.

From 3 July 1996 to 24 March 1997, the battalion deployed as part of the NATO-led Implementation Force to Sarajevo in Bosnia and Herzegovina to support peacekeeping and reconstruction efforts after the Bosnian War. For its conduct and work in Bosnia and Herzegovina the battalion was awarded a Bronze Cross of Army Merit, which was affixed to the battalion's flag.

On 1 September 2001, the battalion was transferred to the Logistic Projection Brigade. On 27 July 2001, the battalion lost its autonomy and the next day entered the newly formed 6th Maneuver Regiment. The regiment consisted of a command, a command and logistic support company, a supply battalion, a maintenance battalion, and a medical unit.

From 2 July 2003 to 7 October 2003, the 6th Maneuver Regiment deployed to Iraq as part of the Italian contribution to the stabilize the country after the invasion of Iraq. For its service in Iraq the regiment was awarded a Bronze Medal of Army Valor, which was affixed to the regiment's flag and added to the regiment's coat of arms.

On 12 September 2013, the Logistic Projection Command was disbanded and the 6th Maneuver Regiment returned to the Paratroopers Brigade "Folgore". On 1 July 2015, the regiment was renamed Logistic Regiment "Folgore" and reorganized as a brigade logistic regiment.

== Organization ==
As of 2024 the Logistic Regiment "Folgore" is organized as follows:

- Logistic Regiment "Folgore", in Pisa
  - Command and Logistic Support Company
  - Logistic Battalion
    - Transport Company
    - Maintenance Company
    - Supply Company

== See also ==
- Military logistics
