= Asiago =

Asiago may refer to:

- Asiago cheese
- Asiago, Veneto
