= 28th Infantry Division "Aosta" =

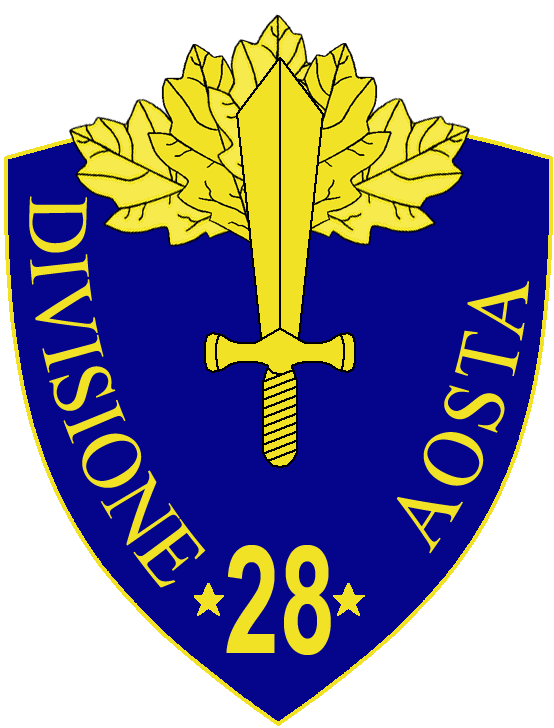
- 28th Infantry Division "Aosta" insignia
- Active: 1939–1943; 1948–1961
- Country: Kingdom of Italy
- Branch: Royal Italian Army
- Type: Infantry
- Size: Division
- Garrison/HQ: Palermo
- Engagements: Battle of Troina

Insignia
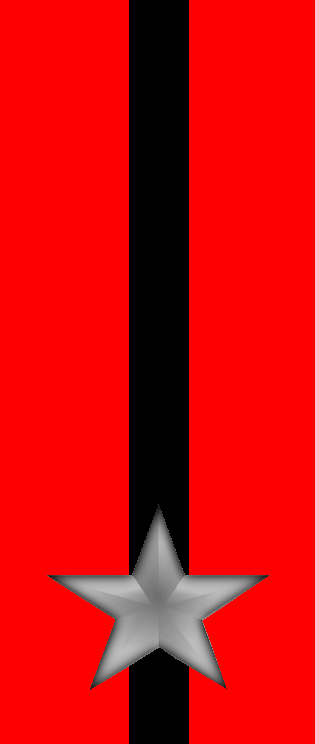
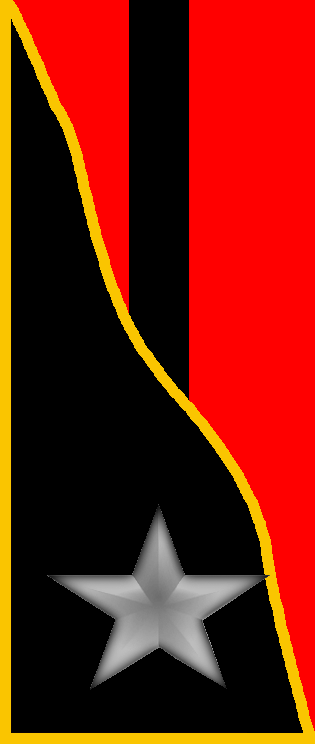
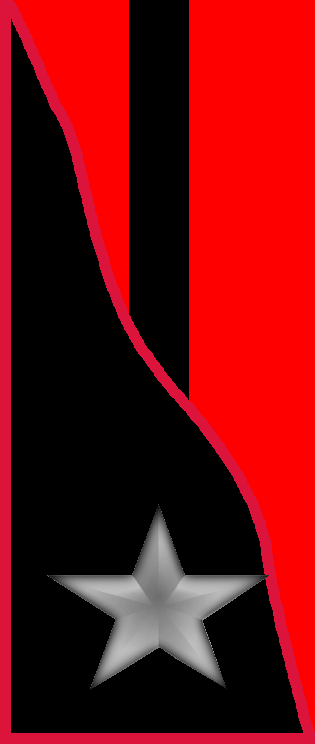
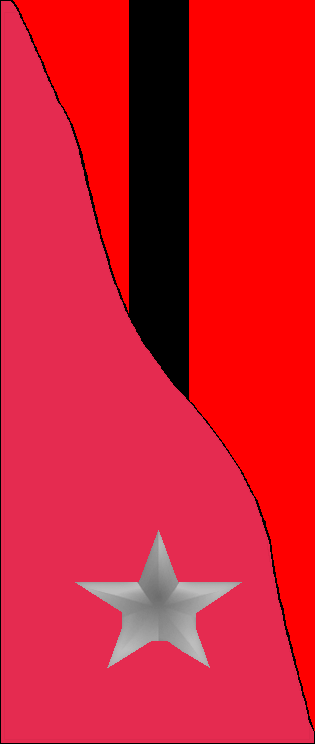
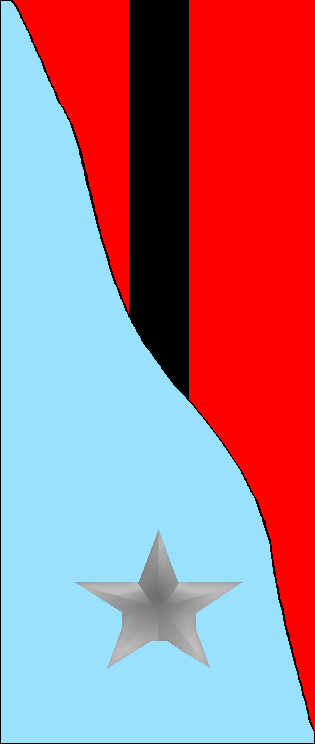
- Identification symbol: Aosta Division gorget patches

The 28th Infantry Division "Aosta" (Italian: 28ª Divisione di fanteria "Aosta") was an infantry division of the Royal Italian Army during World War II. The Aosta was formed for the first time in 1831 and named for the city of Aosta. The division fought in the Allied invasion of Sicily and its remnants were evacuated to Northern Italy, where the division's remnants were disbanded after the Armistice of Cassibile.

The 28th Infantry Division "Aosta" was one of three divisions, which recruited in Sicily. It mainly drafted men from western Sicily and had its peacetime headquarters in Palermo. It's two infantry regiments were based in Trapani (5th) and Palermo (6th), while the division's artillery regiment was based in Palermo. The attached 171st CC.NN. Legion and CLXXI CC.NN. Battalion were recruited in Palermo and the CLXVIII CC.NN. Battalion in Ragusa.

== History ==
The division's lineage begins with the Brigade "Aosta" established on 1 November 1815, which on 25 October 1831 split to form the 1st and 2nd infantry regiments under the brigade's command. On 4 May 1839 the two regiments were re-numbered as 5th and 6th infantry regiments.

=== World War I ===
The brigade fought on the Italian front in World War I. In November 1926 the brigade assumed the name of XXVIII Infantry Brigade and received the 85th Infantry Regiment "Verona". The brigade was the infantry component of the 28th Territorial Division of Palermo, which also included the 22nd Artillery Regiment. In 1934 the division changed its name to 28th Infantry Division "Vespri". On 20 May 1937 the division ceded the 85th Infantry Regiment "Verona" to the newly raised 60th Infantry Division "Sabratha" in Gharyan in Libya. On the same date the XXVIII Infantry Brigade raised the 76th Infantry Regiment "Napoli" as replacement in Trapani.

On 15 April 1939 the 76th Infantry Regiment "Napoli" was transferred to the newly activated 54th Infantry Division "Napoli" and on the same date the XXVIII Infantry Brigade was dissolved and the two remaining infantry regiments came under direct command of the division, which changed its name to 28th Infantry Division "Aosta".

=== World War II ===
Map of Sicily showing divisional locations

After Italy's entry into World War II the Aosta remained in Sicily and was tasked with coastal and airport defence in the Western half of the island.

After the Allied landings at Syracuse on 9 July 1943 the division's positions were considered untenable and it retreated to the centre of the island to link up with 26th Infantry Division "Assietta". The Aosta was badly mauled by US Army troops during the Battle of Troina on 1–6 August 1943 in the North of the island. The remnants of the division retreated to Messina, from where they were evacuated to Trento in Northern Italy between 9 and 12 August 1943. The division was officially declared lost on 18 August 1943. The remnants of the division in Trento were disbanded by invading German forces after the announcement of the Armistice of Cassibile on 8 September 1943.

== Infantry Brigade "Aosta" ==
On 20 September 1944 the Italian Co-Belligerent Army formed in Sicily the III and IV internal security brigades with the regiments of the disbanded 47th Infantry Division "Bari". On 14 October 1944 the two brigades entered the newly activated Internal Security Division "Aosta", which was tasked with public duties, demining and airfield protection tasks until the end of the war.

On 15 August 1946 the Internal Security Division "Aosta" was reorganized as Infantry Brigade "Aosta". With the expansion of the Italian Army after World War II the brigade was expanded to full division on 1 February 1948, but following a revision of strategy the Aosta was once more reduced to brigade on 21 February 1961.

Since then the name and traditions of the division are carried by the Mechanized Brigade "Aosta" in Palermo.

== Organization ==
28th Infantry Division "Aosta" organization in 1940

- 28th Infantry Division "Aosta", in Palermo
  - Headquarters
    - Command Company
    - 82nd Carabinieri Section
    - 83rd Carabinieri Section
    - 63rd Field Post Office
    - 28th Infantry Division Command Transport Squad
  - 5th Infantry Regiment "Aosta", in Trapani
    - Command Company
    - 3 × Fusilier battalions
    - Support Weapons Battery (65/17 mod. 13 infantry support guns)
    - Mortar Company (81mm mod. 35 mortars)
  - 6th Infantry Regiment "Aosta", in Palermo
    - Command Company
    - 3 × Fusilier battalions
    - Support Weapons Battery (65/17 mod. 13 infantry support guns)
    - Mortar Company (81mm mod. 35 mortars)
  - 22nd Artillery Regiment "Aosta", in Palermo
    - Command Unit
    - I Group (100/17 mod. 14 howitzers; transferred in October 1942 to the 25th Artillery Regiment "Assietta")
    - I Group (75/13 mod. 15 mountain guns; transferred in October 1942 from the 25th Artillery Regiment "Assietta")
    - II Group (75/27 mod. 11 field guns)
    - III Group (75/13 mod. 15 mountain guns; transferred in October 1939 from the 52nd Artillery Regiment "Torino"; transferred in September 1940 to the 24th Artillery Regiment "Piemonte")
    - III Group (75/27 mod. 11 field guns; transferred in September 1940 from the 24th Artillery Regiment "Piemonte")
    - IV Group (75/18 mod. 35 howitzers; formed in September 1941; transferred in October 1942 to the 54th Artillery Regiment "Napoli")
    - IV Group (75/18 mod. 34 howitzers; transferred in October 1942 from the 54th Artillery Regiment "Napoli")
    - 328th Anti-aircraft Battery (20/65 mod. 35 anti-aircraft guns)
    - 365th Anti-aircraft Battery (20/65 mod. 35 anti-aircraft guns); formed later)
    - Ammunition and Supply Unit
  - XXVIII Mortar Battalion (81mm mod. 35 mortars)
  - CXXVIII Mixed Engineer Battalion (formed in 1943)
    - 28th Telegraph and Radio Operators Company (independent until 1943)
    - 68th Engineer Company (independent until 1943)
  - 28th Anti-tank Company (47/32 mod. 35 anti-tank guns)
  - 67th Medical Section
    - 204th Field Hospital
    - 205th Field Hospital
    - 206th Field Hospital
    - 1 × Surgical unit
  - 136th Supply Section
  - 1 × Autocarrette Section
  - 1 × Transport Section

Attached to the division from late 1940:

- 171st CC.NN. Legion "Vespri", in Palermo
  - CLXVIII CC.NN. Battalion
  - CLXXI CC.NN. Battalion
  - 171st CC.NN. Machine Gun Company

Plans to form the XXVIII Self-propelled Anti-tank Battalion were abandoned due to the division's destruction in the Sicilian Campaign.

== Commanding officers ==
The division's commanding officers were:

28th Infantry Division "Aosta":

- Generale di Divisione Mario Arisio (1938 - 23 April 1939)
- Generale di Divisione Pietro Maletti (24 April 1939 - 9 June 1940)
- Generale di Brigata Federico D'Arle (10 June 1940 - 5 May 1942)
- Generale di Divisione Brunetto Brunetti (6 May 1942 - 5 October 1942)
- Generale di Divisione Luigi Manzi (6 October 1942 - 3 April 1943)
- Generale di Divisione Giuseppe Romano (4 April 1943 - 18 August 1943)

Internal Security Division "Aosta"':

- Generale di Brigata Giuseppe Castellano (14 October 1944 - 1945)
- Generale di Brigata Silvio Brisotto (acting)
- Generale di Divisione Giulio Vanden Heuvel (1945 - 1946)
- Generale di Divisione Maurizio Lazzaro de Castiglioni (1946 - 15 August 1946)
