= Logistic Regiment "Aosta" =

Active Italian Army brigade logistics unit

- Reggimento Logistico "Aosta"
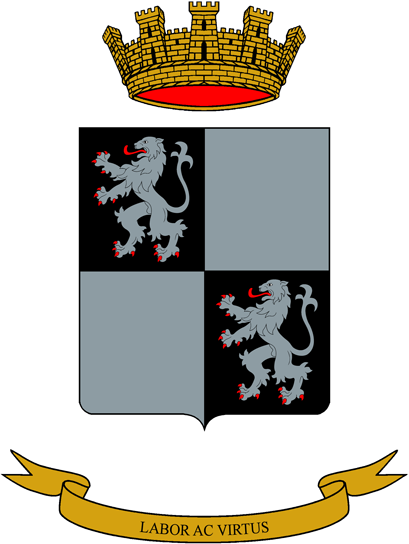
- Regimental coat of arms
- Active: 1 Oct. 1975 — 1 Feb. 2002; 1 June 2015 — today
- Country: Italy
- Branch: Italian Army
- Role: Military logistics
- Part of: Mechanized Brigade "Aosta"
- Garrison/HQ: Palermo
- Motto(s): "Labor ac virtus"
- Anniversaries: 22 May 1916 - Battle of Asiago
- Decorations: 1× Silver Cross of Army Merit

Insignia
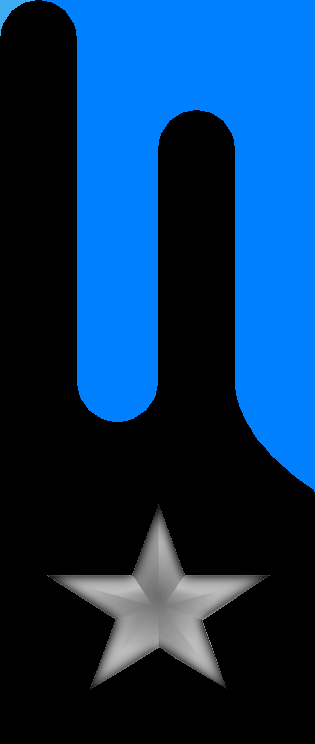
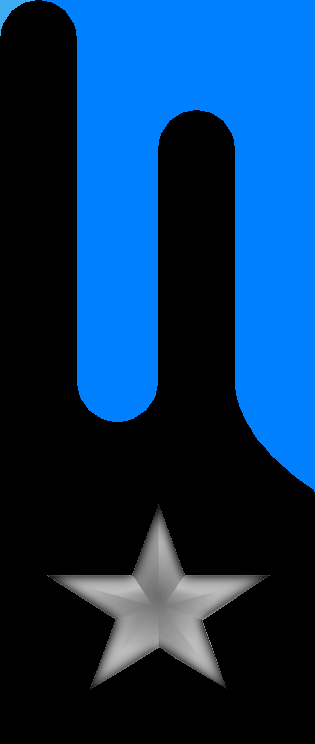
- Unit gorget patches

The Logistic Regiment "Aosta" (Italian: Reggimento Logistico "Aosta") is a military logistics regiment of the Italian Army based in Palermo in Sicily. The regiment was formed on 1 June 2015 and is the logistic unit of the Mechanized Brigade "Aosta". On 20 November 2015, the regiment received the flag of the Logistic Battalion "Aosta" and thus received the name and traditions of the Logistic Battalion "Aosta". The regiment's anniversary falls, as for all units of the Italian Army's Transport and Materiel Corps, on 22 May, the anniversary of the Royal Italian Army's first major use of automobiles to transport reinforcements to the Asiago plateau to counter the Austro-Hungarian Asiago Offensive in May 1916.

== History ==
=== Cold War ===
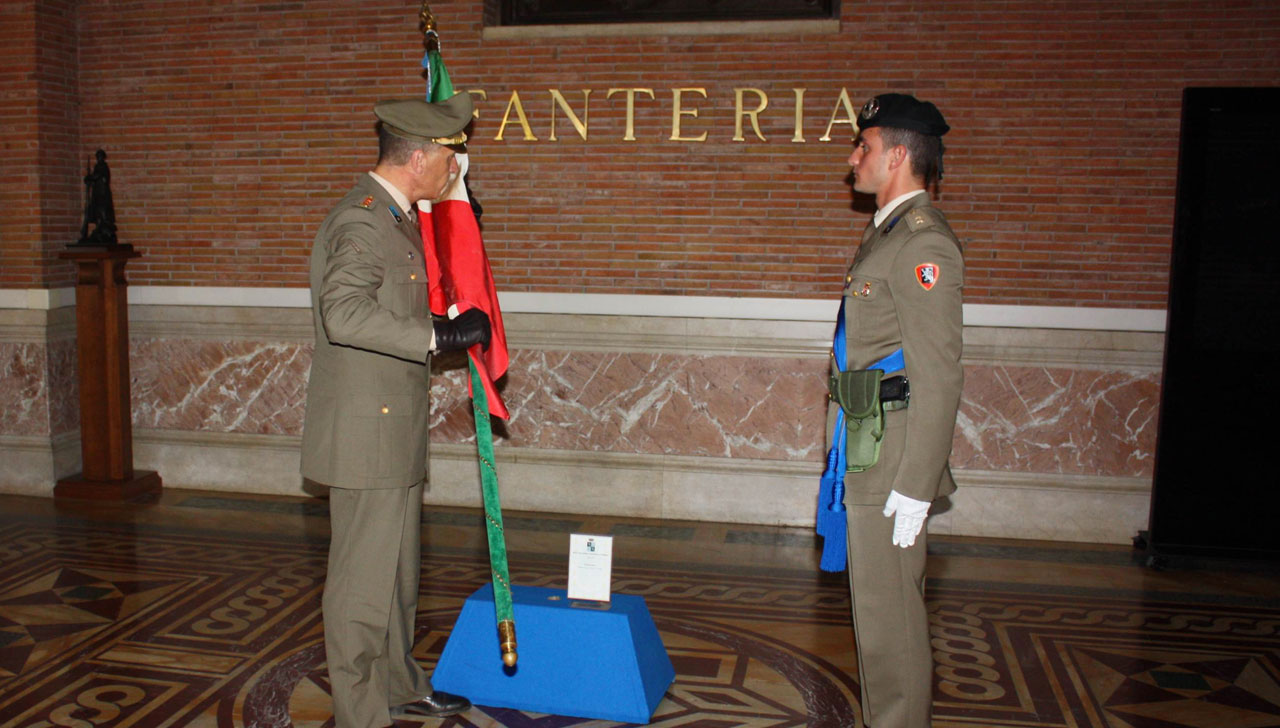
The commanding officer of the Logistic Regiment "Aosta" retrieves the flag of the Logistic Battalion "Aosta" from the Shrine of the Flags in Rome

The regiment is the spiritual successor of the logistic units of the Royal Italian Army's 28th Infantry Division "Aosta", which was destroyed during the Allied invasion of Sicily in World War II. The regiment is also the spiritual successor of the logistic units of the Italian Co-Belligerent Armys' Internal Security Division "Aosta", which was formed on 14 October 1944 in Sicily and reduced on 15 August 1946 to Infantry Brigade "Aosta". The brigade was again expanded to full division on 1 February 1948, but following a revision of strategy it was once more reduced to brigade on 21 February 1961.

On 1 February 1957, the logistic units of the Infantry Division "Aosta" were assigned to the newly formed Service Units Command "Aosta" in Messina. The command consisted of a medical section, a provisions section, a mobile vehicle park, a mobile workshop, and an auto unit. On 1 July 1960, the mobile vehicle park and mobile workshop merged to form the Resupply, Repairs, Recovery Unit "Aosta".

With the division slated to be reduced to brigade the Service Units Command "Aosta" was disbanded on 15 December 1960, with only the Resupply, Repairs, Recovery Unit "Aosta" and Auto Unit "Aosta" joining the brigade on 21 February 1961.

On 1 October 1975, as part of the 1975 army reform, the Resupply, Repairs, Recovery Unit "Aosta" and Auto Unit "Aosta" merged to form the Logistic Battalion "Aosta", which received the traditions of all preceding logistic, transport, medical, maintenance, and supply units bearing the name "Aosta". The battalion consisted of a command, a command platoon, a supply and transport company, a medium workshop, a vehicle park, and a medical company. At the time the battalion fielded 651 men (37 officers, 82 non-commissioned officers, and 532 soldiers).

On 12 November 1976, the President of the Italian Republic Giovanni Leone granted with decree 846 the battalion a flag.

On 1 October 1981, the battalion was reorganized and consisted afterwards of the following units:

- Logistic Battalion "Aosta", in Messina
  - Command and Services Company
  - Supply Company
  - Maintenance Company
  - Medium Transport Company
  - Medical Unit (Reserve)

=== Recent times ===
On 1 February 2002, the battalion was disbanded and the next day its flag was transferred to the Shrine of the Flags in the Vittoriano in Rome for safekeeping. In November 2015 the commander of the Logistic Regiment "Aosta" arrived in Rome to retrieve the flag and transfer it to Palermo, where it arrived at the regiment's base on 20 November 2015.

== Organization ==
As of 2024 the Logistic Regiment "Aosta" is organized as follows:

- Logistic Regiment "Aosta", in Palermo
  - Command and Logistic Support Company
  - Logistic Battalion
    - Transport Company
    - Maintenance Company
    - Supply Company

== See also ==
- Military logistics
