= 62nd Armored Battalion "M.O. Jero" =

Inactive Italian Army tank unit

- 62° Battaglione Corazzato "M.O. Jero"
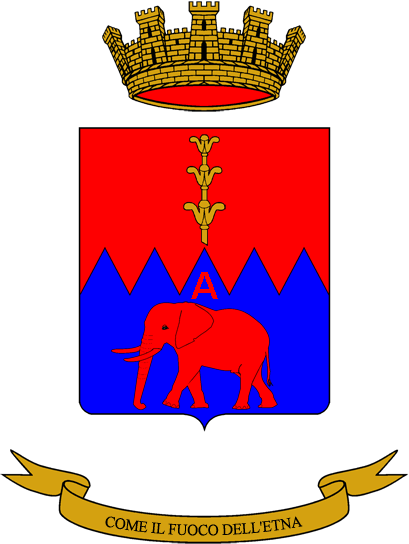
- Battalion coat of arms
- Active: Dec. 1939 — 5 Jan. 1941; 15 May 1960 — 26 Aug. 1992
- Country: Italy
- Branch: Italian Army
- Part of: Motorized Brigade "Aosta"
- Garrison/HQ: Catania
- Motto(s): "Come il fuoco dell'Etna"
- Anniversaries: 1 October 1927

Insignia
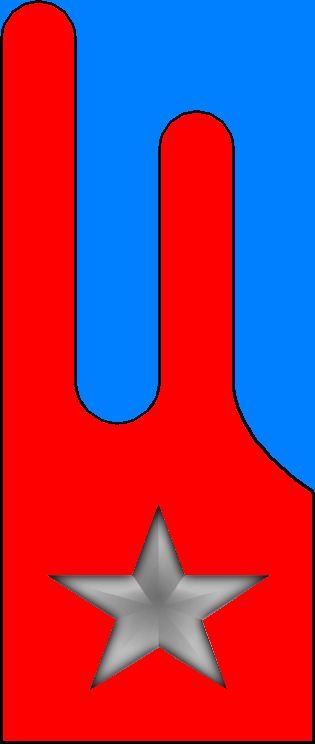
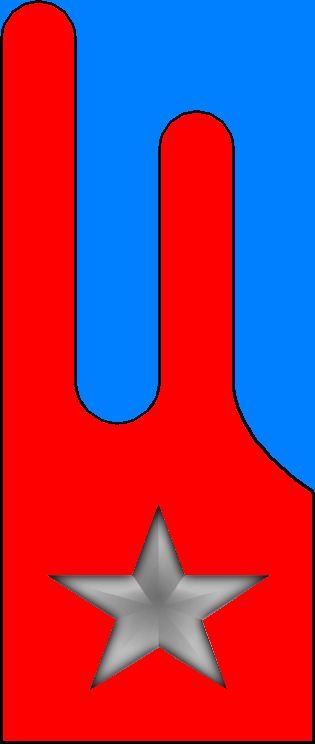
- Tank units gorget patches

The 62nd Armored Battalion "M.O. Jero" (Italian: 62° Battaglione Corazzato "M.O. Jero") is an inactive armored battalion of the Italian Army, which was based in Catania in Sicily and last operationally assigned to the Motorized Brigade "Aosta". The unit's lineage traces back to the World War II LXII Tank Battalion L, which participated in 1940 in the Italian invasion of Egypt. On 5 January 1940, the battalion was destroyed in the Battle of Bardia. In 1960, the battalion was reformed and assigned to the Infantry Division "Aosta". In 1975, the battalion was renamed 62nd Armored Battalion "M.O. Jero". In 1992, the battalion was disbanded and its flag transferred to the Shrine of the Flags in the Vittoriano in Rome.

Originally the unit, like all Italian tank units, was part of the army's infantry arm, but on 1 June 1999 the tankers specialty was transferred from the infantry arm to the cavalry arm. The battalion's anniversary falls, as for all tank units, which have not yet distinguished themselves in battle, on 1 October 1927, the day the tankers speciality was founded.

== History ==
=== World War II ===
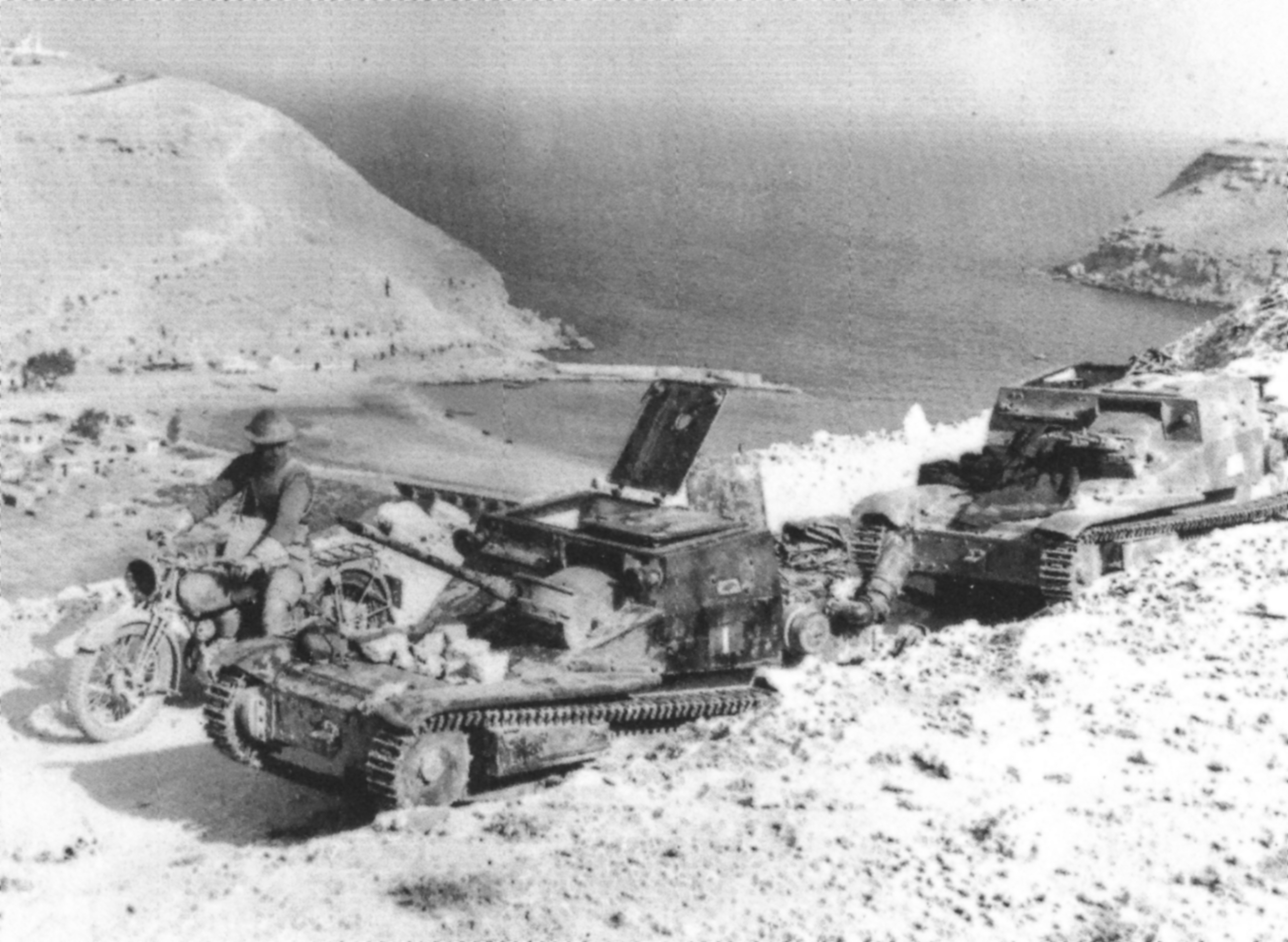
Abandoned L3/35 tankettes in Bardia after the Italian surrender

In December 1939, the depot of the 116th Infantry Regiment "Treviso" in Tobruk in Libya formed a divisional tank battalion for the 62nd Infantry Division "Marmarica". The battalion was equipped with obsolete L3/35 tankettes. On 20 May 1940, the battalion was designated LXII Tank Battalion L (with L standing for Italian: "Leggero" or Light). On 30 August 1940, the battalion was transferred to the 1st Tank Grouping of the Babini Group, with which it participated in the Italian invasion of Egypt. On 16 September 1940, the Italian formations reached the harbor of Sidi Barrani in Egypt and went on the defensive. On 9 December 1940, the British Western Desert Force commenced Operation Compass with an attack against the Italian positions at Sidi Barrani. By 16 December 1940, four Italian divisions, along with the V, XX, LXI, and LXII tank battalions L, had been encircled at Bardia. On 3 January 1941, the British XIII Corps began the Battle of Bardia and 2 days later, on 5 January, the remaining Italian units surrendered. On the same date the LXII Tank Battalion L was declared lost due to wartime events.

=== Cold War ===
On 15 May 1960, the Armored Battalion "Aosta" was formed in Catania and assigned to the Infantry Division "Aosta". The battalion was equipped with M26 Pershing tanks. On 21 February 1961, the division was reduced to Infantry Brigade "Aosta". The same year the battalion was renamed LXII Armored Battalion "Aosta" and the following year it was renamed LXII Armored Battalion.

During the 1975 army reform the army disbanded the regimental level and newly independent battalions were granted for the first time their own flags, respectively in the case of cavalry units, their own standard. On 1 October 1975, the LXII Armored Battalion was renamed 62nd Tank Battalion "M.O. Jero". As part of the reform tank and armored battalions were named for officers, soldiers and partisans of the tank speciality, who had served in World War II and been awarded Italy's highest military honor the Gold Medal of Military Valor. The 62nd Tank Battalion was named for Second Lieutenant Fulvio Jero, who had served as platoon commander in the LXII Tank Battalion L and was killed in action on 3 January 1941 during the Battle of Bardia.

The battalion was assigned to the Motorized Brigade "Aosta" and consisted of a command, a command and services company, two tank companies with M47 Patton tanks, and a mechanized company with M113 armored personnel carriers. The battalion fielded now 536 men (34 officers, 83 non-commissioned officers, and 419 soldiers). On 12 November 1976, the President of the Italian Republic Giovanni Leone granted with decree 846 the 62nd Armored Battalion "M.O. Jero" its flag. In 1988, the battalion replaced its M47 Patton tanks with Leopard 1A2 main battle tanks.

=== Recent times ===
After the end of the Cold War Italian Army began to draw down its forces and, on 26 August 1992, the 62nd Armored Battalion "M.O. Jero" and the 62nd Mechanized Infantry Battalion "Sicilia" were disbanded. The next day the personnel and materiel of the two battalions was used to form the 62nd Armored Infantry Regiment "Sicilia". On 28 August 1992, the flag of the 62nd Armored Battalion "M.O. Jero" was transferred to the Shrine of the Flags in the Vittoriano in Rome for safekeeping.

== See also ==
- Motorized Brigade "Aosta"
