= 5th Infantry Regiment "Aosta" =

- 5° Reggimento Fanteria "Aosta"
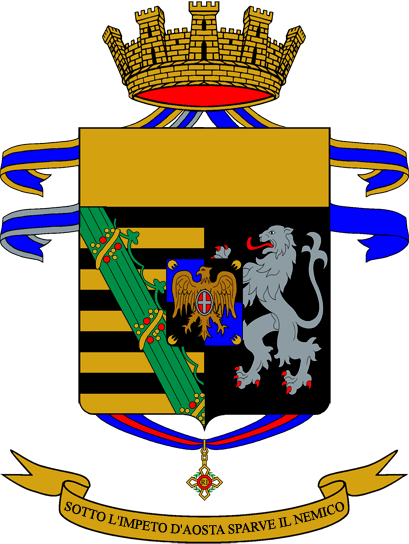
- Regimental coat of arms
- Active: 20 February 1690 – today
- Country: Italy
- Branch: Italian Army
- Part of: Mechanized Brigade "Aosta"
- Garrison/HQ: Messina
- Motto: "Sotto l'impeto d'Aosta sparve il nemico"
- Anniversaries: 26 November 1917 – Battle of Col della Berretta
- Decorations: 1× Military Order of Italy; 2× Gold Medals of Military Valor; 1× Silver Medal of Military Valor; 1× Bronze Medal of Military Valor

Commanders
- Current commander: Col. Gianvito Tinelli

Insignia
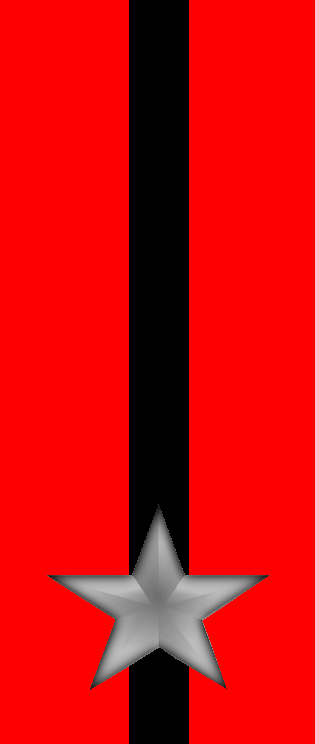
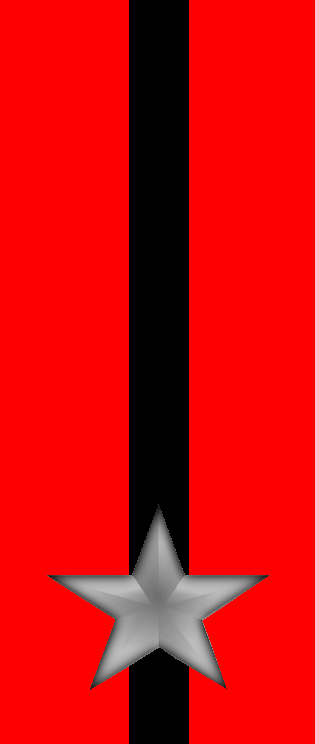
- Regimental gorget patches

The 5th Infantry Regiment "Aosta" (Italian: 5° Reggimento Fanteria "Aosta") is an active unit of the Italian Army based in Messina in Sicily. The regiment is part of the Italian army's infantry corps and operationally assigned to the Mechanized Brigade "Aosta".

The 5th Infantry Regiment "Aosta" is the oldest infantry regiment in active service in the Italian Army.

== History ==
The origins of the 5th Infantry Regiment "Aosta" date back to 1690 in the Savoyard state.

=== Savoyard state ===
On 20 February 1690, the Fusiliers Regiment of His Royal Highness was established by Duke Victor Amadeus II. The Regiment was recruited and led by Colonel Giuseppe Filiberto Costa, Count of Trinità, as Ordnance Infantry Regiment to provide escort and protection to the artillery. The Regiment was based in Vercelli.

In December 1710, the Regiment incorporated the Regiment "Santa Giulia". On 16 September 1774, the Regiment assumed the name Regiment "Aosta". The Regiment fought in the Nine Years' War (from its establishment in 1690 to 1697), the War of the Spanish Succession, the War of the Quadruple Alliance (1718 to 1719), the War of the Polish Succession, the War of the Austrian Succession (from 1742 to 1748) and of the French invasion of Piedmont.

In December 1798 the Regiment "Aosta", together with the regiments "Savoia" and "Lombardia", formed the 1st Line Half Brigade, which was disbanded with its regiments in May 1799 due to Revolutionary France occupying Piedmont and forcing Charles Emmanuel IV of Sardinia to abdicate the throne in favor of the Piedmontese Republic.

With the defeat of Napoleon at the Battle of Leipzig and the restoration of the Kingdom of Sardinia in 1814 the regiment was reformed. On 1 November 1815 it was renamed Brigade "Aosta". On 25 October 1831 the brigade split to form the 1st and 2nd infantry regiments under the brigade's command. On 4 May 1839 the two regiments were re-numbered as 5th and 6th infantry regiments.

=== Kingdom of Italy ===
The Brigade "Aosta" with its two regiments was engaged in the First Italian War of Independence, for which its two regiments were decorated with a Silver Medal of Military Valor. In 1859 the brigade fought in the Second Italian War of Independence, for which its two regiments were decorated with a Gold Medal of Military Valor and then participated in the repression of Brigandage in Southern Italy in 1861 and in Aspromonte in 1862. For these operations the IV Battalion of the 5th Regiment was awarded a Bronze Medal of Military Valor. In 1866 the brigade participated in the Third Italian War of Independence.

On 15 October 1871, the brigade command was disbanded and the regiment was renamed 5th Infantry Regiment "Aosta". The new denomination lasted until 1881, when the regiment was renamed 5th Regiment (Brigade "Aosta"), due to the reintroduction of brigades in the Royal Italian Army.

The regiment provided personnel for the First Italo-Ethiopian War and the Italo-Turkish War.

=== World War I ===
At the outbreak of World War I, the Brigade "Aosta" formed, together with the Brigade "Verona" and the 22nd Field Artillery Regiment, the 23rd Division. At the time the 5th Infantry Regiment consisted of three battalions, each of which fielded four fusilier companies and one machine gun section. In 1915 the Brigade "Aosta" had its headquarter in the city of Gemona.

On 3 July 1915, the 5th Regiment was sent to Sella Nevea and Raccolana Valley, to support the troops of the 4th Army Corps that attacked the Austrian stronghold of Plezzo.

In early March 1916, the 5th and 6th Regiment "Aosta" assembled in Conca di Plezzo, before being deployed on the right bank of Isonzo river and on the slopes of Mount Kukla. A few days after the end of the Fifth Battle of the Isonzo, on 19 March 1916, the Austrians, preceded by a destructive bombardment, attacked by surprise and managed to overcome the Italian defenses at the bottom of the valley. In the evening, the 8th and 9th companies of the 5th Regiment counterattacked and reestablished the Italian lines.

During the Sixth Battle of the Isonzo (6–17 August 1916), the 5th Regiment was deployed with two battalions around Zagora and with one battalion on the Carso. Particularly intense was the battle around Zagora, where the Italian troops attacked the Monte Santo, defended by the 62nd Austrian Division. From November 1916 until the end of the year, the fusiliers of the Brigade "Aosta" remained entrenched between Pecinka and Dosso Faiti.

In April 1917, the Brigade "Aosta" was transferred to Asiago as reserve for the 20th Army Corps. In July the brigade arrived at the front and was deployed between Strigno and Cima della Caldiera, in front of Mount Ortigara.

Following the Battle of Caporetto, the brigade retreated to the Col della Berretta. On 26 November 1917, the Austro-German offensive breached the Italian lines, but the II Battalion of the 5th Regiment counterattacked and held the line until reinforcements arrived. The II Battalion was annihilated in the action. After the First Battle of Monte Grappa, the Brigade "Aosta" was sent to the rear to rest and reorganize.

In 1918, after having sustained 1,223 casualties in six days of fighting on the Montello the brigade was sent to rest in the Brenta Valley. On 24 October 1918, the 5th Regiment attacked Mount Valderoa and succeeded in also seizing the Solaroli and Spinoncia mountains on 31 October 1918.

The regiment also fought in Ravnilaz, on the Carso, in Doberdò, Cima Debeli, on the Col Moschin and Cà d'Anna, on the Montello, and in Vittorio Veneto.

Between 24 and 28 October 1918 the brigade conquered the summit of Monte Valderoa and held it against repeated Austrian counterattacks. For this last engagement of the war the brigade's two regiments were awarded their second Gold Medal of Military Valor.

=== Interwar years ===
In November 1926 the Brigade "Aosta" assumed the name of XXVIII Infantry Brigade and received the 85th Infantry Regiment "Verona". The brigade was the infantry component of the 28th Territorial Division of Palermo, which also included the 22nd Artillery Regiment.

In 1935–36 the 5th Infantry Regiment "Aosta" provided 458 personnel (4 Officers and 454 troops) for the Second Italo-Ethiopian War.

On 15 April 1939 the XXVIII Infantry Brigade was dissolved and the two "Aosta" infantry regiments came under direct command of the division, which changed its name to 28th Infantry Division "Aosta".

=== Second World War ===
Italy formed "binary" divisions before the outbreak of World War II and the regiment together with its sister regiment formed the infantry component of the 28th Infantry Division "Aosta", which also included the 22nd Artillery Regiment. The 28th Infantry Division "Aosta" was part of the XII Army Corps, in turn directly dependent on the Army Group "Sud".

The Regiment was organized as follows:

- 5th Infantry Regiment "Aosta", in Trapani
  - Command Company
  - 3× Fusilier battalions
  - Support Weapons Company (65/17 infantry support guns)
  - Mortar Company (81mm Mod. 35 mortars)

After Italy's entry into World War II the 28th Infantry Division "Aosta" remained in Sicily and was tasked with coastal and airport defence in the Western half of the island and the Pelagian Islands.

After the Allied landings at Syracuse on 10 July 1943 the division's positions were considered untenable and it retreated to the centre of the island to link up with the 26th Infantry Division "Assietta". On 1–6 August 1943 the Aosta was badly mauled by US Army troops during the Battle of Troina in the North of the island. The remnants of the division retreated to Messina, from where they were evacuated to Trento in Northern Italy between 9 and 12 August 1943. The division was officially declared lost on 18 August 1943. The remnants of the division in Trento were disbanded by invading German forces after the announcement of the Armistice of Cassibile on 8 September 1943.

On 20 September 1944 the Italian Co-Belligerent Army formed in Sicily the III and IV internal security brigades with the regiments of the disbanded 47th Infantry Division "Bari". On 14 October 1944 the two brigades entered the newly activated Internal Security Division "Aosta", which was tasked with public duties, demining and airfield protection tasks until the end of the war.

=== Italian Republic ===
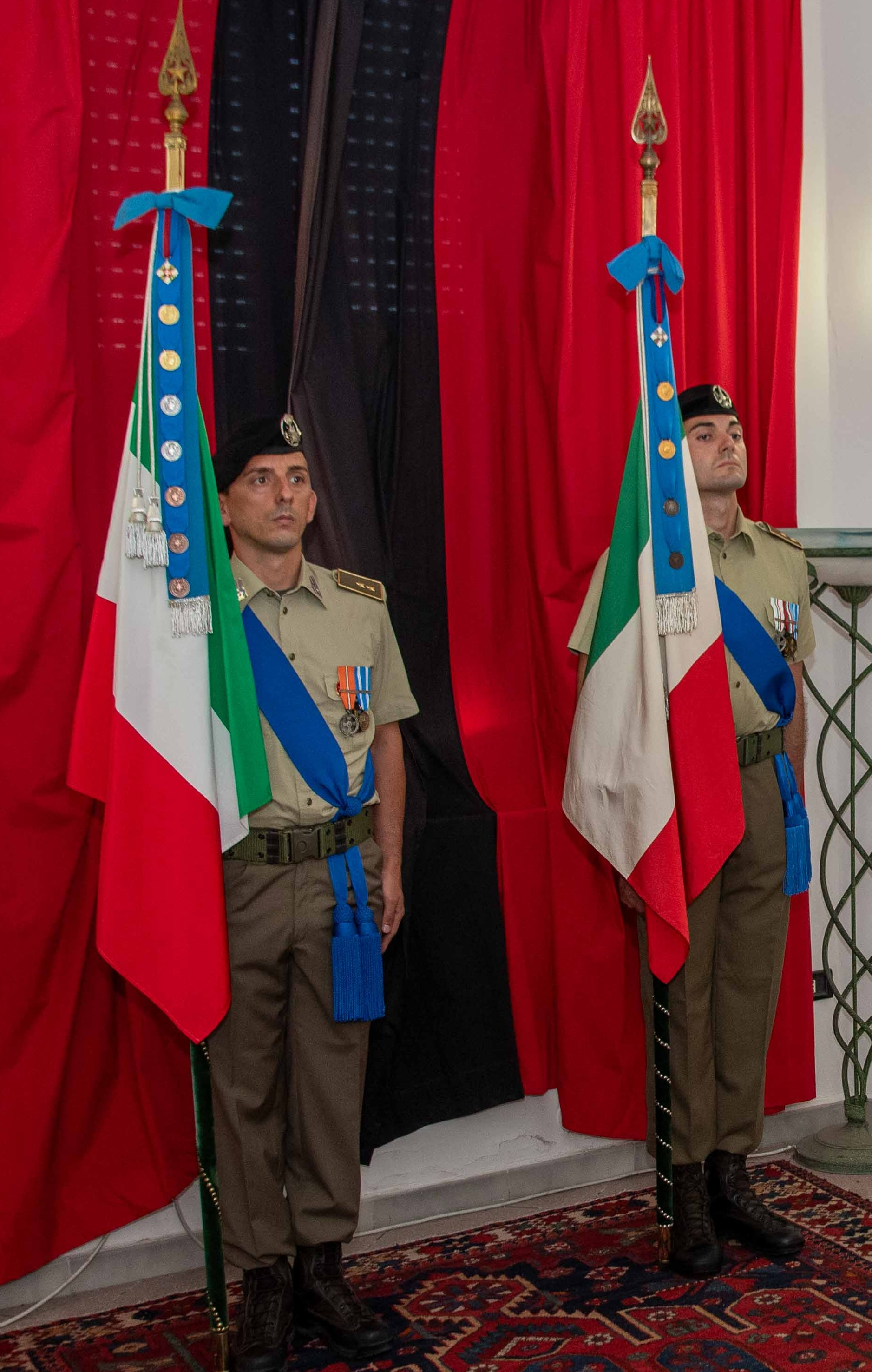
Flags of the 5th Infantry Regiment "Aosta" (on the right) and 6th Infantry Regiment "Aosta" (on the left)

On 15 August 1946 the Internal Security Division "Aosta" was reorganized as Infantry Brigade "Aosta" and on 1 September 1946, the 5th Regiment received its traditional name of 5th Infantry Regiment "Aosta".

The structure of the regiment was similar to its wartime structure:

- Command and Command Platoon (later expanded to company)
- 3× fusilier battalions
- Mortar Company
- Support Weapons Company

On 31 December 1947, the regiment ceded its III Battalion to contribute to the reestablishment of the 17th Infantry Regiment "Acqui".

With the 1975 army reform the Italian Army abolished the regimental level and battalions came under direct command of the brigades and regional commands. Therefore, on 1 October 1975, the 5th Infantry Regiment "Aosta" was disbanded. On the same day the regiment's three infantry battalions were reformed as:

- I Infantry Battalion, in Messina reformed as 5th Motorized Infantry Battalion "Col della Beretta". The battalion was assigned the flag and traditions of the 5th Infantry Regiment "Aosta".
- II Infantry Battalion, in Catania reformed as 62nd Motorized Infantry Battalion "Sicilia". The battalion was assigned the flag and traditions of the 62nd Infantry Regiment "Sicilia".
- III Infantry Battalion, in Palermo reformed as 141st Motorized Infantry Battalion "Catanzaro" The battalion was assigned the flag and traditions of the 141st Infantry Regiment "Catanzaro".

In 1991 the 5th Motorized Infantry Battalion "Col della Beretta" was reorganized as a mechanized battalion. On 31 August 1992 the battalion was elevated to 5th Mechanized Infantry Regiment "Aosta" without changing size or composition.

== Organization ==
As of 2026 the 5th Infantry Regiment "Aosta" consists of:

- Regimental Command, in Messina
  - Command and Logistic Support Company
  - 1st Infantry Battalion
    - 1st Fusiliers Company
    - 2nd Fusiliers Company
    - 3rd Fusiliers Company
    - Maneuver Support Company

The regiment is equipped with VTLM Lince vehicles and scheduled to receive Freccia wheeled infantry fighting vehicles. The Maneuver Support Company is equipped with 120mm mortars and Spike anti-tank guided missiles.

== See also ==
- Mechanized Brigade "Aosta"
