= Mechanized Brigade "Aosta" =

- Brigata Meccanizzata "Aosta"
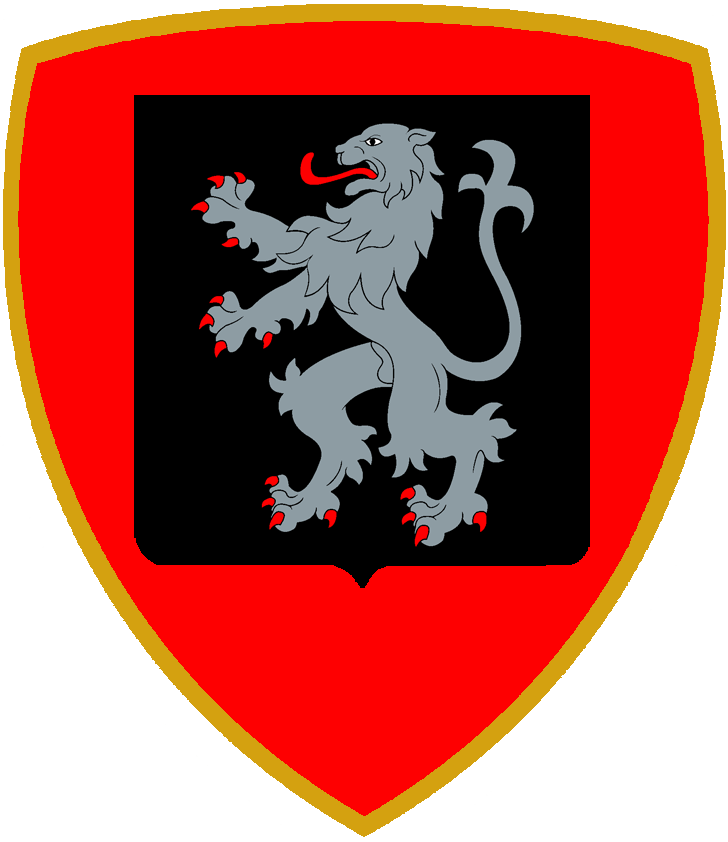
- Coat of Arms of the Mechanized Brigade "Aosta"
- Active: 25 October 1831 – today
- Country: Italy
- Branch: Italian Army
- Role: Infantry
- Size: Brigade
- Part of: Division "Acqui"
- Garrison/HQ: Messina
- Colors: red
- Engagements: World War I World War II; Bosnia SFOR; Kosovo KFOR; Afghanistan ISAF; Iraq Multinational force in Iraq

Commanders
- Current commander: Brigadier Roberto Perretti

The Mechanized Brigade "Aosta" (Italian: Brigata Meccanizzata "Aosta") is a mechanized infantry brigade of the Italian Army based on the island of Sicily. The Brigade is one of the oldest of the Italian Army and the name connects the brigade to its original area of recruitment the Aosta Valley and therefore the brigade's coat of arms is modeled after the coat of arms of Aosta. The brigade is part of the Division "Acqui".

== History ==
=== 1831 to 1914 ===
After Charles Albert of Sardinia ascended to the throne of the Kingdom of Sardinia on 27 April 1831 a major reform of the kingdom's military was started. Thus on 25 October 1831 the Brigade "Aosta" was raised with two infantry regiments. These two regiments were the "His Royal Highness; Fusilier Regiment" (Italian: Reggimento Fucilieri di Sua Altezza Reale) founded on 20 February 1690 and a newly raised infantry regiment. Earlier from 1 November 1815 to 25 October 1831 the "HRH Fusilier Regiment" was already known as "Brigade of Aosta" (Italian: Brigata di Aosta), however in size and function this unit was an infantry regiment with two battalions. Between 1774 and 1799 the "HRH Fusilier Regiment" was known as the "Regiment of Aosta" (Italian: Reggimento di Aosta). After the founding of the Brigade "Aosta" its two regiments consisted of three battalions each: the regiment's 1st and 2nd battalions fielded three companies of fusiliers and one company of grenadiers, while the third battalions consisted of four companies of skirmishers. Later a fourth battalion was added to each regiment and the companies' strength was increased. By 1839 each regiment fielded four battalions, which in turn fielded 4 companies of 250 men each. In 1839 the regiments of the "Aosta" were numbered and renamed as 5th Infantry Regiment Brigade "Aosta" and 6th Infantry Regiment Brigade "Aosta".

The brigade participated in the First Italian War of Independence, fighting in the battles of Santa Lucia, Goito, Pastrengo and Novara, where the brigade's two regiments earned a Silver Medal of Military Valor. In 1855 the brigade provided two battalions for the Sardinian Expeditionary Corps in the Crimean War. In the Second Italian War of Independence the brigade was employed in the battles of Magenta and Solferino. The brigade was awarded a Gold Medal of Military Valor for its conduct at Solferino. Furthermore, the IV Battalion of the 5th Regiment was awarded a Bronze Medal of Military Valor for its conduct during the Battle of Aspromonte. In the following years the brigade was employed in Calabria and the region of Salerno to suppress the popular revolt of the peasant population against the annexation of the Kingdom of the Two Sicilies into the new Kingdom of Italy. In the Third Italian War of Independence the brigade fought in the Battle of Custoza.

Personnel of the brigade was also employed in the First Italo-Ethiopian War and the Italo-Turkish War.

=== World War I ===
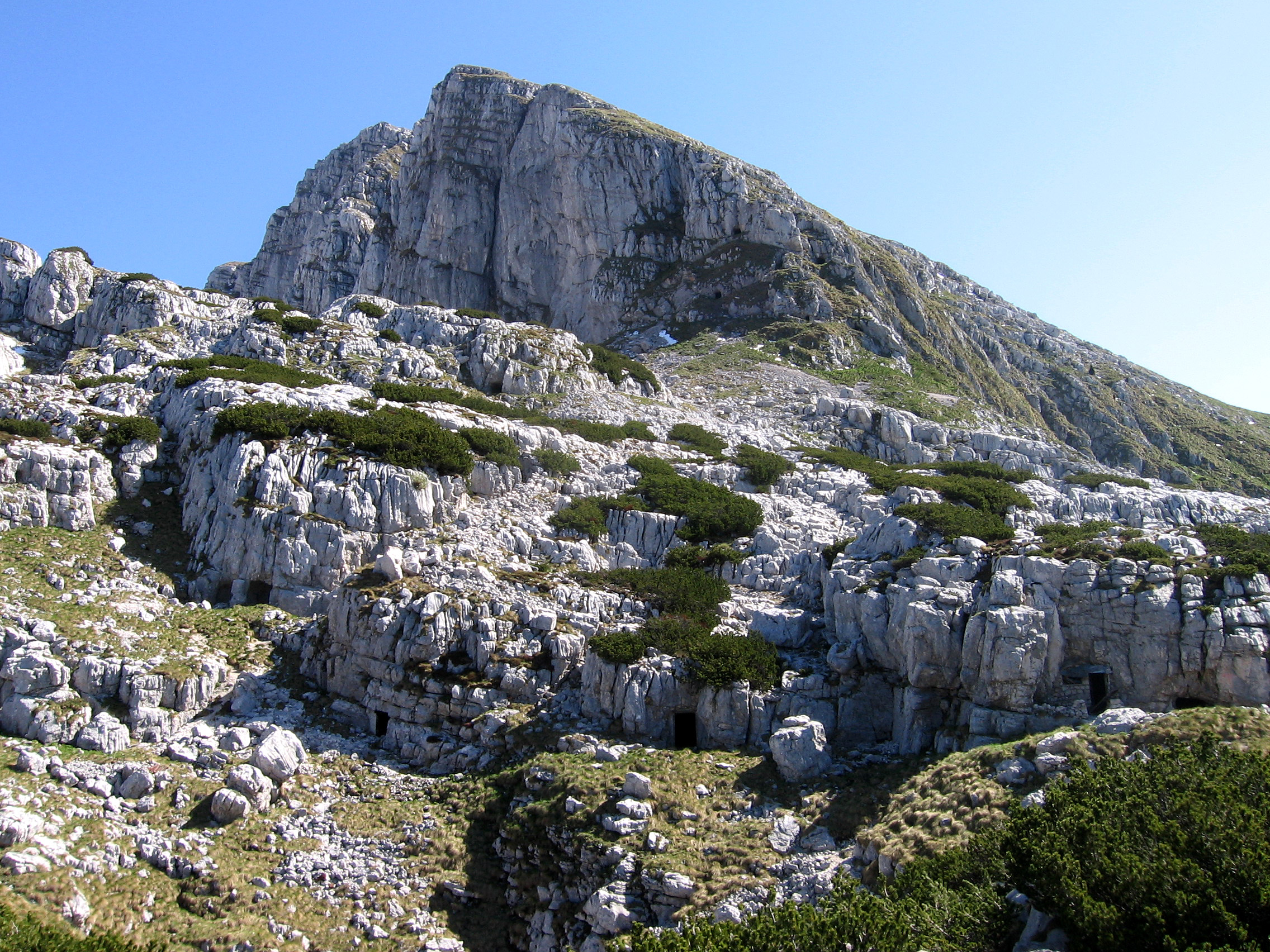
Monte Rombon

At the outbreak of World War I the brigade was based in the city of Gemona with its two regiments fielding three battalions each and each of the battalions consisting of four companies and a machine gun section. The 6th Regiment was the first to see action on the Italian front when it tried to conquer the Plöcken Pass on 3 July 1916. Afterwards the brigade reinforced by two battalions of Alpini was given the task to conquer Monte Rombon. In 1916 the brigade was engaged in combat in the region of Kras. From 22 to 26 November 1917 the brigade defended the summit of Col della Berretta on the Monte Grappa massif during the Battle of Monte Grappa, which put an end the Austrian offensive after the Battle of Caporetto.

In October 1918 the brigade conquered the summit of Monte Valderoa and held it against repeated Austrian counterattacks. For this last engagement of the war the "Aosta" Brigade's two regiments were awarded their second Gold Medal of Military Valor.

=== World War II ===
After the end of World War I the brigade moved to Sicily and was garrisoned in the city of Palermo. In November 1926 the brigade assumed the name of XXVIII Infantry Brigade and received the 85th Infantry Regiment "Verona". The brigade was the infantry component of the 28th Territorial Division of Palermo, which also included the 22nd Artillery Regiment. In 1934 the division changed its name to 28th Infantry Division "Vespri". On 20 May 1937 the division ceded the 85th Infantry Regiment "Verona" to the newly raised 60th Infantry Division "Sabratha" in Gharyan in Libya. On the same date the XXVIII Infantry Brigade raised the 76th Infantry Regiment "Napoli" as replacement in Trapani.

On 15 April 1939 the 76th Infantry Regiment "Napoli" was transferred to the newly activated 54th Infantry Division "Napoli" and on the same date the XXVIII Infantry Brigade was dissolved and the two remaining infantry regiments came under direct command of the division, which changed its name to 28th Infantry Division "Aosta".

On 9 July 1943 the Allied invasion of Sicily began and the division was badly mauled by US Army troops during the Battle of Troina in the North of the island. The remnants of the division were evacuated to mainland Italy between 9 and 12 August 1943. After the Armistice between Italy and Allied armed forces of 8 September 1943 the division was disbanded by German Forces near the city of Trento.

On 20 September 1944 the Italian Co-Belligerent Army formed in Sicily the III and IV internal security brigades with the regiments of the disbanded 47th Infantry Division "Bari". On 14 October 1944 the two brigades entered the newly activated Internal Security Division "Aosta", which was tasked with public duties, demining and airfield protection tasks until the end of the war.

=== Cold War ===
==== Infantry Division "Aosta" ====
On 15 August 1946 the Internal Security Division "Aosta" was reorganized as Infantry Brigade "Aosta". On 1 September 1946 the regiments of the brigade returned to their old names 5th respectively 6th Infantry Regiment "Aosta" and were based in Messina and Palermo. With the expansion of the Italian Army after World War II the brigade was expanded to a full division on 1 February 1948 and the two "Aosta" infantry regiments were joined by the 46th Infantry Regiment "Reggio" and the 22nd and 24th Field Artillery regiments from the dissolved Infantry Brigade "Reggio". However already on 15 June 1955 the division began to shrink with the disbandment of the 6th Infantry Regiment. The III Battalion of the 5th Infantry Regiment received the colors and traditions of the disbanded regiment. The Division was under the command of the XI Military Territorial Command/Sicily Military Region in Palermo, which had administrative command of all units based in Sicily and was tasked with the defense of Sicily, Pantelleria and the Pelagian Islands.

- Infantry Division "Aosta"
  - 5th Infantry Regiment "Aosta", in Messina
    - I Infantry Battalion
    - II Infantry Battalion
  - 6th Infantry Regiment "Aosta", in Palermo (disbanded on 15 June 1955)
    - III Infantry Battalion (joined the 5th "Aosta" on 15 June 1955)
    - IV Infantry Battalion
  - 45th Infantry Regiment "Reggio", in Catania (disbanded on 15 June 1955)
    - I Infantry Battalion
    - II Infantry Battalion
  - 22nd Field Artillery Regiment "Vespri", in Palermo
    - I Artillery Group
    - II Artillery Group
  - 24th Field Artillery Regiment "Peloritani", in Messina
    - I Artillery Group
    - II Artillery Group
  - XI Engineer Battalion
  - 11th Signal Company

==== Infantry Brigade "Aosta" ====
On 21 February 1961 the division was reduced once more to infantry brigade and consisted now of the 5th Infantry Regiment "Aosta" (with three infantry battalions), the LXII Armored Battalion and the Field Artillery Group "Aosta". The 46th Infantry Regiment "Reggio" became a training unit under direct command of the XI Military Territorial Command. After the reform the structure was as follows:

- Infantry Brigade "Aosta", in Messina
  - 5th Infantry Regiment "Aosta", in Messina
    - Command and Services Company, in Messina
    - I Infantry Battalion, in Messina
    - II Infantry Battalion, in Catania
    - III Infantry Battalion, in Palermo
    - Regimental Anti-tank Company, in Messina (anti-tank guided missiles and M47 tanks)
  - LXII Armored Battalion "Aosta", in Catania (M47 Patton tanks and M113 armored personnel carriers)
  - Field Artillery Group "Aosta", in Messina (M14/61 105 mm towed howitzers)
  - Light Aviation Unit "Aosta", at Catania-Fontanarossa Air Base (L-21B Super Cub)
  - Engineer Company "Aosta", in Siracusa
  - Signal Company "Aosta", in Messina
  - Supply, Repairs, Recovery Unit "Aosta", in Messina
  - Transport Unit "Aosta", in Messina

==== Motorized Brigade "Aosta" ====
With the 1975 reform the army abolished the regimental level and battalions came under direct command of the brigades. Therefore, on 1 October 1975 the 5th Regiment was disbanded and its three battalions came forthwith under direct command of the Motorized Brigade "Aosta". The new organization of the brigade was therefore:

- Motorized Brigade "Aosta", in Messina
  - Command and Signal Unit "Aosta", in Messina
  - 5th Motorized Infantry Battalion "Col della Berretta", in Messina (former I Battalion, 5th Infantry Regiment)
  - 46th Infantry Battalion "Reggio" (Recruits Training), in Palermo (former I Battalion, 46th Infantry Regiment, disbanded 14 February 1978)
  - 62nd Motorized Infantry Battalion "Sicilia", in Catania (former II Battalion, 5th Infantry Regiment)
  - 141st Motorized Infantry Battalion "Catanzaro", in Palermo (former III Battalion, 5th Infantry Regiment)
  - 62nd Armored Battalion "M.O. Jero", in Catania (Leopard 1A2 main battle tanks and VCC-2 armored personnel carriers)
  - 24th Field Artillery Group "Peloritani", in Messina (M114 155 mm towed howitzers)
  - Logistic Battalion "Aosta", in Messina
  - Anti-tank Company "Aosta", in Messina
  - Engineer Company "Aosta", in Syracuse

The brigade continued to be under command of the Sicily Military Region (Italian: Regione Militare della Sicilia – R.M.SI.) in Palermo. As the command was tasked with defending the outlying Pantelleria and Pelagian islands, a battalion staff was activated on Pantelleria and Aosta units rotated to the island for garrison duty. Besides the Aosta the following units were part of the XI Military Territorial Command after the reform:

- Sicily Military Region, in Palermo
  - R.M.SI. Command Unit, in Palermo
  - 60th Infantry (Recruits Training) Battalion "Col di Lana", in Trapani (former I Battalion, 60th Infantry Regiment)
  - 46th Signal Battalion "Mongibello", in Palermo
  - 30th Light Airplanes and Helicopters Squadrons Group "Pegaso", at Catania-Fontanarossa Air Base
    - Command and Services Squadron
    - 301st Light Airplanes Squadron (SM.1019A planes)
    - 430th Reconnaissance Helicopters Squadron (AB 206 reconnaissance helicopters)
    - 530th Multirole Helicopters Squadron (AB 204B/205 multirole helicopters)
  - 11th Logistics Unit, in Messina
  - 11th Mixed Maneuver Transport Unit, in Palermo (became 11th Transport Battalion "Etnea" on 1 October 1987)
  - 11th Medical Company, in Palermo
  - 11th Provisions Supply Company, in Palermo
  - 11th Army Repairs Workshop Type B, in Palermo
  - Military Hospital Type B, in Palermo
  - Military Hospital Type B, in Messina
  - Garrison Detachment, on Pantelleria island

== Recent history ==
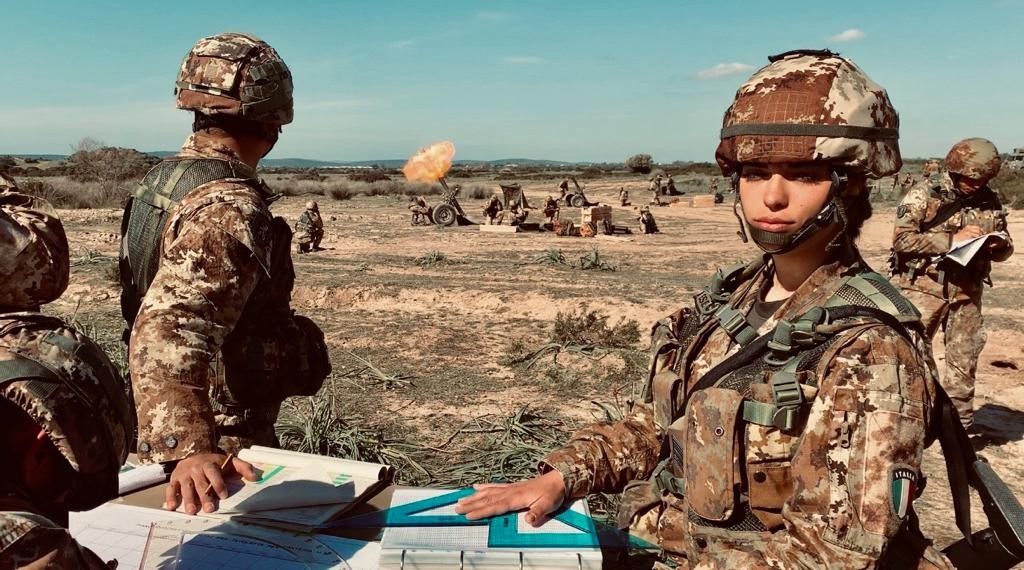
Mechanized Brigade "Aosta" mortar teams

With the end of the Cold War the Italian Army began to disbanded a large number of its mechanized brigades in Northern Italy and redistributed their materiel: the Aosta received VCC-2 armored personnel carriers for its infantry battalions and M109 self-propelled howitzers for the 24th "Peloritani". Accordingly, the brigade changed its name on 18 August 1992 to Mechanized Brigade "Aosta". In the same year the brigade began its six-year involvement in the Operation "Sicilian Vespers" a security and policing operation in Sicily undertaken by the Italian Armed Forces between 25 January 1992 and 8 July 1998.

After the end of the Cold War the brigade continuously changed composition as the Italian Army was drawing down its forces and moving a large number of units from the North to the South of the country, as most volunteers came from the economically less developed Southern regions.

- 21 April 1991 the 141st Motorized Infantry Battalion "Catanzaro" disbanded its companies and transferred its name, flag and traditions to the "Minor Islands" Battalion on Pantelleria (the "Catanzaro" was disbanded on 27 May 1995)
- 7 May 1991 the 6th Tank Squadrons Group "Lancieri di Aosta" of the Armored Brigade "Vittorio Veneto" left Cervignano del Friuli and moved to Palermo to join the Aosta
- 31 March 1992 the 23rd Bersaglieri Battalion "Castel di Borgo" of the 132nd Armored Brigade "Ariete" left Tauriano and moved to Trapani to join the "Aosta"
- 27 August 1992 the 62nd Armored Battalion "M.O. Jero" merged with the 62nd Mechanized Infantry Battalion "Sicilia" to form the 62nd Armored Infantry Regiment "Sicilia"
- 31 August 1992 the 5th Mechanized Infantry Battalion "Col della Berretta" changed its name to 5th Infantry Regiment "Aosta"
- 2 September 1992 the 23rd Bersaglieri Battalion "Castel di Borgo" changed its name to 12th Bersaglieri Regiment
- 19 September 1992 the 51st Pioneer Battalion "Simeto" in Palermo reformed as the 4th Engineer Regiment and joined the Aosta
- 16 October 1992 the 24th Field Artillery Group "Peloritani" changed its name to 24th Self-propelled Field Artillery Regiment "Peloritani"
- 3 March 1993 the 6th Tank Squadrons Group "Lancieri di Aosta" changed its name to Regiment "Lancieri di Aosta" (6th)
- 1 January 1996 the 62nd Armored Infantry Regiment "Sicilia" reformed as the 62nd Tank Regiment "Sicilia"
- during 2001 the 62nd Tank Regiment "Sicilia" reformed to a mechanized infantry regiment
- 15 April 2005 the 12th Bersaglieri Regiment changed its name to 6th Bersaglieri Regiment

== Organization ==
Aosta units 2022

During the late 1990s the "Lancieri di Aosta" exchanged its Leopard 1A2 main battle tanks for Centauro wheeled tank destroyers. In 2013 the brigade gained the Logistic Regiment "Aosta" in Messina. As of 4 October 2022 the brigade is organized as follows:

- Mechanized Brigade "Aosta", in Messina
  - 6th Command and Tactical Supports Unit "Aosta", in Messina
  - Regiment "Lancieri di Aosta" (6th), in Palermo
  - 5th Infantry Regiment "Aosta", in Messina
  - 6th Bersaglieri Regiment, in Trapani
  - 62nd Infantry Regiment "Sicilia", in Catania
  - 24th Field Artillery Regiment "Peloritani", in Messina
  - 4th Engineer Regiment, in Palermo
  - Logistic Regiment "Aosta", in Palermo

All regiments are battalion sized.

== Equipment ==
The infantry regiments and the Bersaglieri regiment of the brigade are equipped with Freccia wheeled infantry fighting vehicles. The "Lancieri di Aosta" regiment is equipped with Centauro and Centauro 2 wheeled tank destroyers and VTLM Lince vehicles. The brigade's artillery regiment fields 18x FH-70 towed howitzers.

== Gorget patches ==
The personnel of the brigade's units wears the following gorget patches:ref name="Aosta"/>

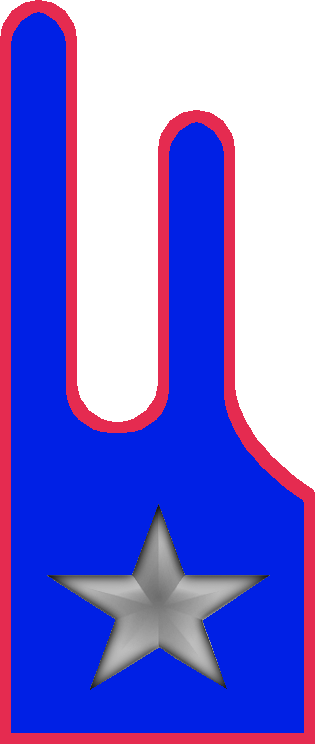
6th Command and Tactical Supports Unit "Aosta"

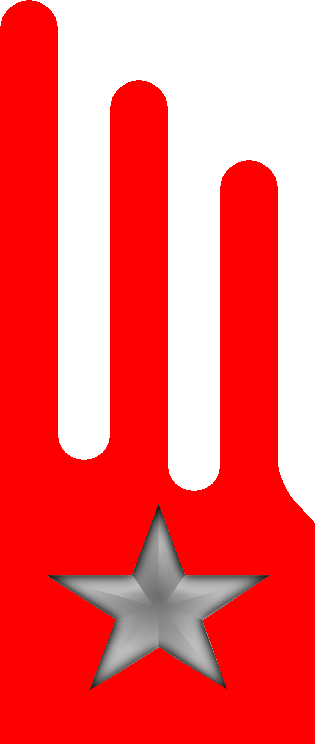
Regiment "Lancieri di Aosta" (6th)

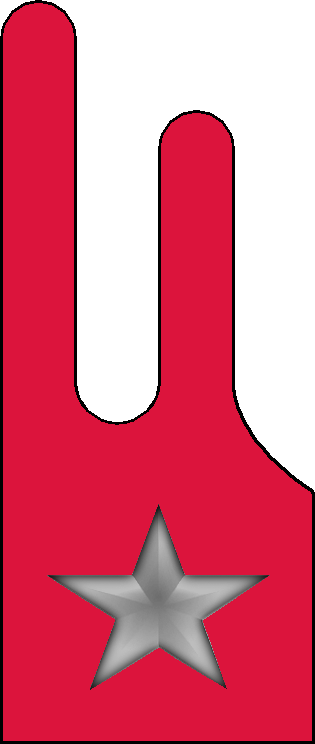
6th Bersaglieri Regiment

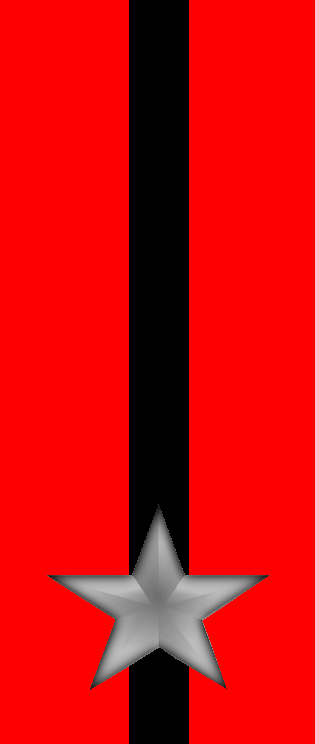
5th Infantry Regiment "Aosta"

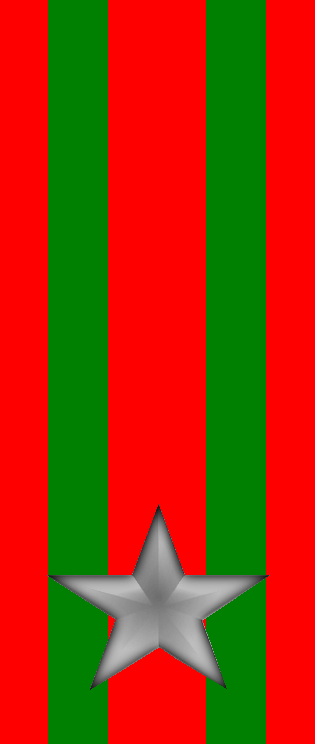
62nd Infantry Regiment "Sicilia"

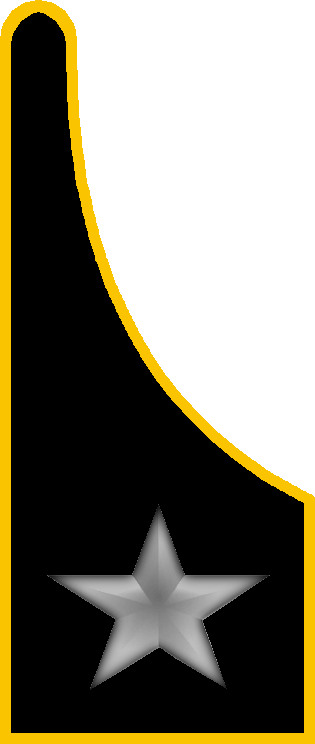
24th Artillery Regiment "Peloritani"

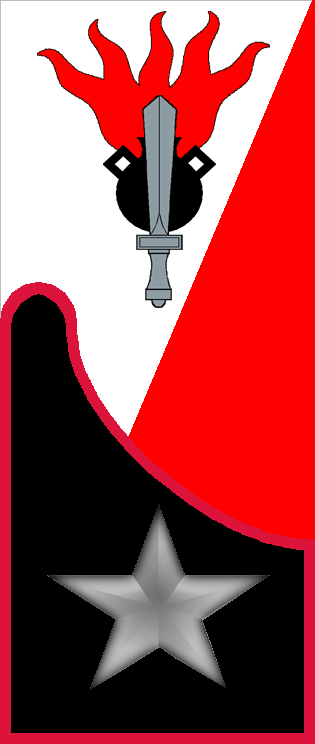
4th Engineer Regiment

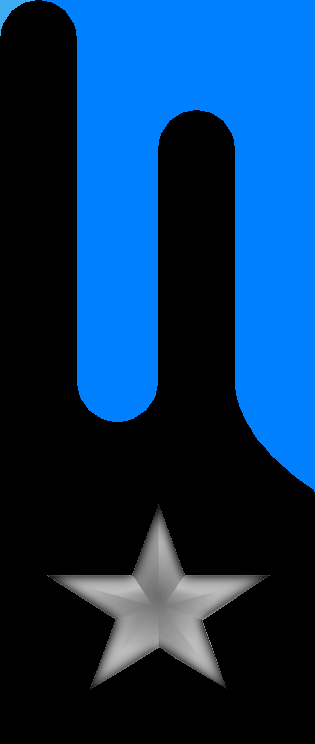
Logistic Regiment "Aosta"
