= 62nd Infantry Regiment "Sicilia" =

Active Italian Army infantry unit

- 62° Reggimento Fanteria "Sicilia"
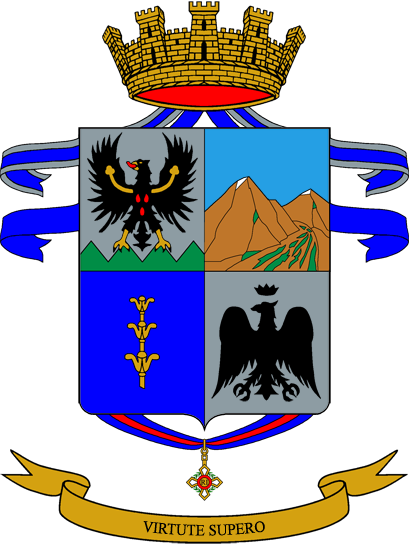
- Regimental coat of arms
- Active: 16 April 1861 – 25 Nov. 1942; 1 Oct. 1975 – today
- Country: Italy
- Branch: Italian Army
- Part of: Mechanized Brigade "Aosta"
- Garrison/HQ: Catania
- Motto: "Virtute supero"
- Anniversaries: 23 October 1942 – Second Battle of El Alamein
- Decorations: 1× Military Order of Italy; 2× Silver Medals of Military Valor; 2× Bronze Medals of Military Valor

Insignia
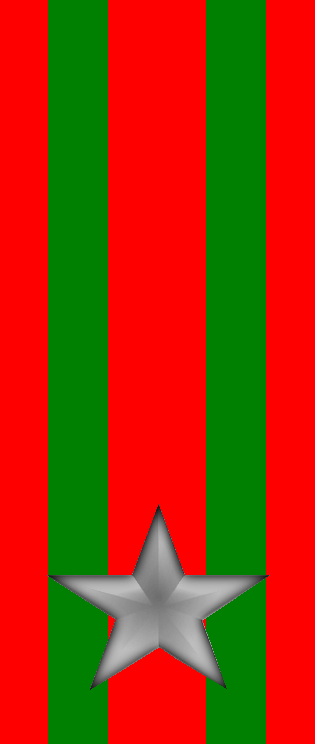
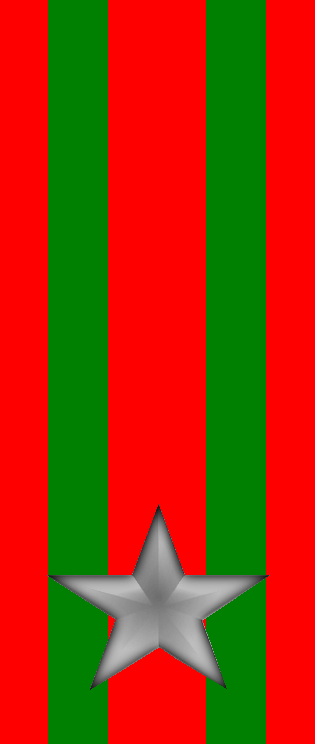
- Regimental gorget patches

The 62nd Infantry Regiment "Sicilia" (Italian: 62° Reggimento Fanteria "Sicilia") is an active unit of the Italian Army based in Catania in Sicily. The regiment is named for the region of Sicily and part of the Italian Army's infantry arm. As of 2024 the regiment is assigned to the Mechanized Brigade "Aosta".

The regiment was one of ten infantry regiments formed by the Royal Italian Army on 16 April 1861. In 1866, the regiment participated in the Third Italian War of Independence and in 1870 in the capture of Rome. During World War I, the regiment fought on the Italian front and the Macedonian front. During World War II, the regiment was assigned to the 102nd Motorized Division "Trento", with which it fought in the Western Desert Campaign in North Africa. In November 1942, the regiment was destroyed during the Second Battle of El Alamein.

In 1975, the unit was reformed as 62nd Motorized Infantry Battalion "Sicilia". The battalion was assigned to the Motorized Brigade "Aosta" and inherited the flag and traditions of the 62nd Infantry Regiment "Sicilia". In 1991, the battalion was mechanized and one year later the battalion's personnel and materiel was used to help form the 62nd Armored Infantry Regiment "Sicilia". In 1996, the regiment became a tank unit and in 2001 it reverted to an infantry unit. The regiment's anniversary falls on 23 October 1942, the first day of the Second Battle of El Alamein, during which the regiment fought to its annihilation.

== History ==
=== Formation ===
On 16 April 1861, the Royal Italian Army formed the Brigade "Sicilia" in Naples. The brigade consisted of the 61st Infantry Regiment and 62nd Infantry Regiment, which were formed on the same day and based in Naples, respectively in Nola. The 61st Infantry Regiment received three battalions ceded by the 18th Infantry Regiment of the Brigade "Acqui", and by the 27th Infantry Regiment and 28th Infantry Regiment of the Brigade "Pavia", while the 62nd Infantry Regiment received three battalions ceded by the 3rd Infantry Regiment and 4th Infantry Regiment of the Brigade "Piemonte", and by the 52nd Infantry Regiment of the Brigade "Alpi".

In 1861–62, the regiment operated in the area of Durazzano to suppress the anti-Sardinian revolt, which had erupted in Southern Italy after the Kingdom of Sardinia had annexed the Kingdom of Two Sicilies. In June 1961, the regiment's 2nd Company and 3rd Company, distinguished themselves in the fighting against rebel forces at Durazzano, for which they were awarded a Bronze Medal of Military Valor, which was affixed to the flag of the 62nd Infantry Regiment (Brigade "Sicilia"). On 1 August 1862, the regiment ceded its 17th Company and 18th Company to help form the 68th Infantry Regiment (Brigade "Palermo"), and one of its depot companies to help form the 72nd Infantry Regiment (Brigade "Puglie"). In 1866, the regiment participated in the Third Italian War of Independence, during which the regiment participated in the invasion of Trentino. On 21–22 July 1866, the regiment fought in the Battle Primolano and on 23 July in the Battle of Vigolo. For its conduct in the two battles the regiment was awarded a Silver Medal of Military Valor, which was affixed to the regiment's flag. In September 1870, the regiment participated in the capture of Rome.

On 25 October 1871, the brigade level was abolished, and the two regiments of the Brigade "Sicilia" were renamed 61st Infantry Regiment "Sicilia", respectively 62nd Infantry Regiment "Sicilia". On 2 January 1881, the brigade level was reintroduced, and the two regiments were renamed again as 61st Infantry Regiment (Brigade "Sicilia") and 62nd Infantry Regiment (Brigade "Sicilia"). On 1 November 1884, the regiment ceded some of its companies to help form the 84th Infantry Regiment (Brigade "Venezia") in Alessandria. In 1895–96, the regiment provided three officers and 97 enlisted for units deployed to Italian Eritrea for the First Italo-Ethiopian War. In 1911, the regiment provided men and materiel for units deployed to Libya for the Italo-Turkish War.

=== World War I ===
At the outbreak of World War I, the Brigade "Sicilia" formed, together with the Brigade "Toscana" and the 16th Field Artillery Regiment, the 6th Division. At the time the 62nd Infantry Regiment consisted of three battalions, each of which fielded four fusilier companies and one machine gun section. On 15 March 1915, the 62nd Infantry Regiment's depot in Parma provided personnel to help form the 111th Infantry Regiment and 112th Infantry Regiment for the Brigade "Piacenza". After Italy's entry into the war on 23 May 1915, the Brigade "Sicilia" was deployed on the Italian front: in June 1915, the brigade was deployed in the Ledro Valley. On 18–19 October the brigade conquered the summit of Cima Palone. In December 1915, the 62nd Infantry Regiment's depot in Parma formed the 263rd Infantry Regiment, which on 6 April 1916 was renumbered 208th Infantry Regiment and assigned to the Brigade "Taro". The same month, April 1916, the brigade was transferred to the Lagarina Valley. On 18 May 1916, the brigade was sent as reinforcements to the Asiago plateau, where the Austro-Hungarian Army had begun the Battle of Asiago. On 25–30 May 1916, the 62nd Infantry Regiment's II Battalion and III Battalion withstood repeated Austro-Hungarian attacks on Passo Buole.

In July 1916, the brigade was ordered to move to the Macedonian front. On 8 August 1916, the first units of the brigade embarked in Taranto and sailed to Thessaloniki in Greece. In fall 1916, the brigade fought in the Monastir offensive. In May 1917, the brigade fought in the Battle of the Crna Bend. In September 1918, the brigade participated in the Vardar offensive and then in the Liberation of Serbia. After the war the Brigade "Sicilia" remained in Macedonia until July 1919.

After its return to Italy the 62nd Infantry Regiment was awarded a Bronze Medal of Military Valor for its conduct at Passo Buole during the Battle of Asiago. The medal was affixed to the regiment's flag and added to the regiment's coat of arms.

=== Interwar years ===
In 1920, the command of the 62nd Infantry Regiment and the regiment's III Battalion were part of the allied force sent to Constantinople to occupy the city. On 21 April 1920, the command was used to form the 313th Infantry Regiment, which consisted of the 62nd Infantry Regiment's III Battalion and a battalion from the disbanded 136th Infantry Regiment (Brigade "Campania"). On 1 October 1923, the 313th Infantry Regiment was ordered to leave Constantinople and, after arriving in Taranto in Italy, the regiment was disbanded on 15 October 1923.

On 15 October 1926, the Brigade "Sicilia" was renamed VIII Infantry Brigade. The brigade was the infantry component of the 8th Territorial Division of Piacenza, which also included the 21st Field Artillery Regiment. On the same date the brigade's two infantry regiments were renamed 61st Infantry Regiment "Sicilia", respectively 62nd Infantry Regiment "Sicilia". The VIII Infantry Brigade also received the 65th Infantry Regiment "Valtellina" from the disbanded Brigade "Valtellina".

In 1934, the 8th Territorial Division of Piacenza changed its name to 8th Infantry Division "Po". A name change that also extended to the division's infantry brigade. On 28 January 1936, the division was sent to Libya as a deterrent force during the Second Italo-Ethiopian War. On 2 September of the same year the division returned to Italy. On 1 November 1936, the 8th Infantry Division "Po" transferred the 62nd Infantry Regiment "Sicilia" to the 32nd Motorized Division "Trento" and the regiment moved from Parma to Trento. Upon entering the 32nd Motorized Division "Trento" the regiment was renamed 62nd Motorized Regiment "Sicilia". On 15 May 1937, the 8th Infantry Division "Po" transferred the 61st Infantry Regiment "Sicilia" to the 32nd Motorized Division "Trento". The regiment then moved from Parma to Trento and was renamed 61st Motorized Regiment "Sicilia". The 32nd Motorized Division "Trento" also included the 46th Field Artillery Regiment.

On 2 January 1939, the 32nd Motorized Division "Trento" changed its name to 102nd Motorized Division "Trento". On the same date the 61st and 62nd motorized regiments, and the 46th Artillery Regiment changed their names to "Trento". On 22 January 1939, the division received the 7th Bersaglieri Regiment based in Bolzano.

=== World War II ===
At the outbreak of World War II, the 62nd Motorized Regiment "Trento" consisted of a command, a command company, three fusilier battalions, a support weapons battery equipped with 65/17 infantry support guns, and a mortar company equipped with 81mm Mod. 35 mortars. On 10 June 1940, Italy entered World War II and invaded France. The "Trento" division was assigned to the Army of the Po as reserve. In March 1941, the division was shipped to Libya for the Western Desert Campaign.

In April 1941, the "Trento" division participated in the Axis attack, which forced British and Commonwealth forces to retreat. On 10 April, the division reached Marsa al-Brega, on 12 April Derna, and on 13th April the division arrived in Ain el Gazala. On 15 April 1941, the division defeated British forces at Acroma. By then the 9th Australian Division fell back to the fortified port of Tobruk, while the remaining British and Commonwealth forces withdrew to Sallum on the Libyan–Egyptian border. On 20 April 1941, the "Trento" division assembled at Bu Amud to the East of Tobruk for the Siege of Tobruk. On 30 April, the 62nd Motorized Regiment "Trento" was detached from the division and sent to the Bardia-Sollum sector further east.

On 15 May 1941, the British XIII Corps launched Operation Brevity to clear the Halfaya Pass. The Axis force defending the pass included a battalion of the 62nd Motorized Regiment "Trento". By evening British forces took control of the pass, but German forces retook on 27 May 1941 during Operation Skorpion. On 15 June 1941, the 62nd Motorized Regiment "Trento" was attacked by British forces during Operation Battleaxe. The regiment had to abandon its positions at Halfaya Pass and Fort Capuzzo, but German-Italian forces retook the lost positions in fierce counterattacks on 17 and 18 June 1941.

On 18 November 1941, the British Eighth Army launched Operation Crusader to relieve the siege of Tobruk. The "Trento" division, which together with the 17th Infantry Division "Pavia", the 25th Infantry Division "Bologna", and the 27th Infantry Division "Brescia" formed the Italian XXI Army Corps, came under attack from the defenders of Tobruk and British spearheads arriving from Egypt. By 9 December 1941, the "Trento" division had to fall back to Ain el Gazala. On 10 December 1941, the British lifted the siege of Tobruk. On 14 December the "Trento" division began to retreat, reaching Ajdabiya on 23 December.

On 1 January 1942, the depot of the 62nd Motorized Regiment "Trento" in Trento formed the 112th Infantry Regiment "Piacenza", which on 15 March 1942 was assigned to the 103rd Infantry Division "Piacenza". After reorganizing at El Agheila the German-Italian Panzer Group Africa counterattacked on 21 January 1942 and drove British forces back to Ain el Gazala. On 26 May 1942, Axis forces commenced the Battle of Gazala. On the first day of the battle the "Trento" division attacked the 1st South African Infantry Division at Bir Belabat and took the position the next day. On 15 June 1942, British forces abandoned the Gazala Line and the "Trento" division pursued the retreating Commonwealth forces. On 20 June 1942, the "Trento" division reached Acroma on the outskirts of Tobruk. The division swung around the British defenders at Tobruk and pursued the British forces retreating towards Egypt. On 25 June the "Trento" division arrived in Bardia, Sollum and Sidi Barrani.

On 26 June 1942, the Battle of Mersa Matruh commenced and on 27 June the "Trento" division began its attack on Mersa Matruh, which fell on 29 June. On 1 July 1942, the "Trento" division reached the area of El Alamein and the next day joined in the First Battle of El Alamein. On 30 August 1942, Axis forces launched the Battle of Alam el Halfa with the aim to outflank the British position at El Alamein. The "Trento" division attacked the positions of the 9th Australian Division and 1st South African Infantry Division to fix the divisions in place, while the Axis' main force attacked further South. By 5 September 1942, the Axis forces had fallen back to their starting positions and began to dig in for the expected British counterattack.

On 23 October 1942, the British Eighth Army began the Second Battle of El Alamein and the next day the "Trento" division, which was positioned on Miteirya Ridge, came under attack from the 2nd New Zealand Division and 10th Armoured Division. By 25 October, the Allies had broken through the minefields and fought the "Trento" division on top of Miteiriya Ridge. By then the "Trento" division had lost half its infantry and most of its artillery to incessant British artillery and air attacks. The intense combat continued until 4 November when General Erwin Rommel ordered his divisions to retreat. However the "Trento" division and the 132nd Armored Division "Ariete" were surrounded by British forces at Bir el Abd and destroyed. On 25 November 1942, the "Trento" division and its regiment were declared lost due to wartime events.

For its conduct and valor in the Western Desert Campaign the 62nd Motorized Regiment "Trento" was awarded a Silver Medal of Military Valor, which was affixed to the regiment's flag and added to the regiment's coat of arms.

=== Cold War ===
During the 1975 army reform the army disbanded the regimental level and newly independent battalions were granted for the first time their own flags. On 30 September 1975, the 5th Infantry Regiment "Aosta" was disbanded and the next day the regiment's II Battalion in Catania became an autonomous unit and was renamed 62nd Motorized Infantry Battalion "Sicilia". The battalion was assigned to the Motorized Brigade "Aosta" and consisted of a command, a command and services company, three motorized companies, and a heavy mortar company equipped with towed 120mm Mod. 63 mortars. At the time the battalion fielded 844 men (41 officers, 94 non-commissioned officers, and 709 soldiers). On 12 November 1976, the President of the Italian Republic Giovanni Leone assigned with decree 846 the flag and traditions of the 62nd Infantry Regiment "Sicilia" to the 62nd Motorized Infantry Battalion "Sicilia".

=== Recent times ===
On 1 June 1991, battalion was reorganized as a mechanized unit and renamed 62nd Mechanized Infantry Battalion "Sicilia". The battalion consisted now of a command, a command and services company, three mechanized companies equipped with M113 armored personnel carriers, and a mortar company equipped with M106 mortar carriers with 120mm Mod. 63 mortars. On 26 August 1992, the 62nd Mechanized Infantry Battalion "Sicilia" and the 62nd Armored Battalion "M.O. Jero" were disbanded and the next day the personnel and materiel of the two battalions was used to form the 62nd Armored Infantry Regiment "Sicilia", which inherited the flag and traditions of the 62nd Infantry Regiment "Sicilia". The new regiment fielded a mix of Leopard 1A2 main battle tanks and M113 armored personnel carrier.

On 1 January 1996, the 62nd Armored Infantry Regiment "Sicilia" was reorganized as a tank unit and renamed 62nd Tank Regiment. In 2001, the regiment lost its role as tank unit and was renamed 62nd Infantry Regiment "Sicilia".

== Organization ==
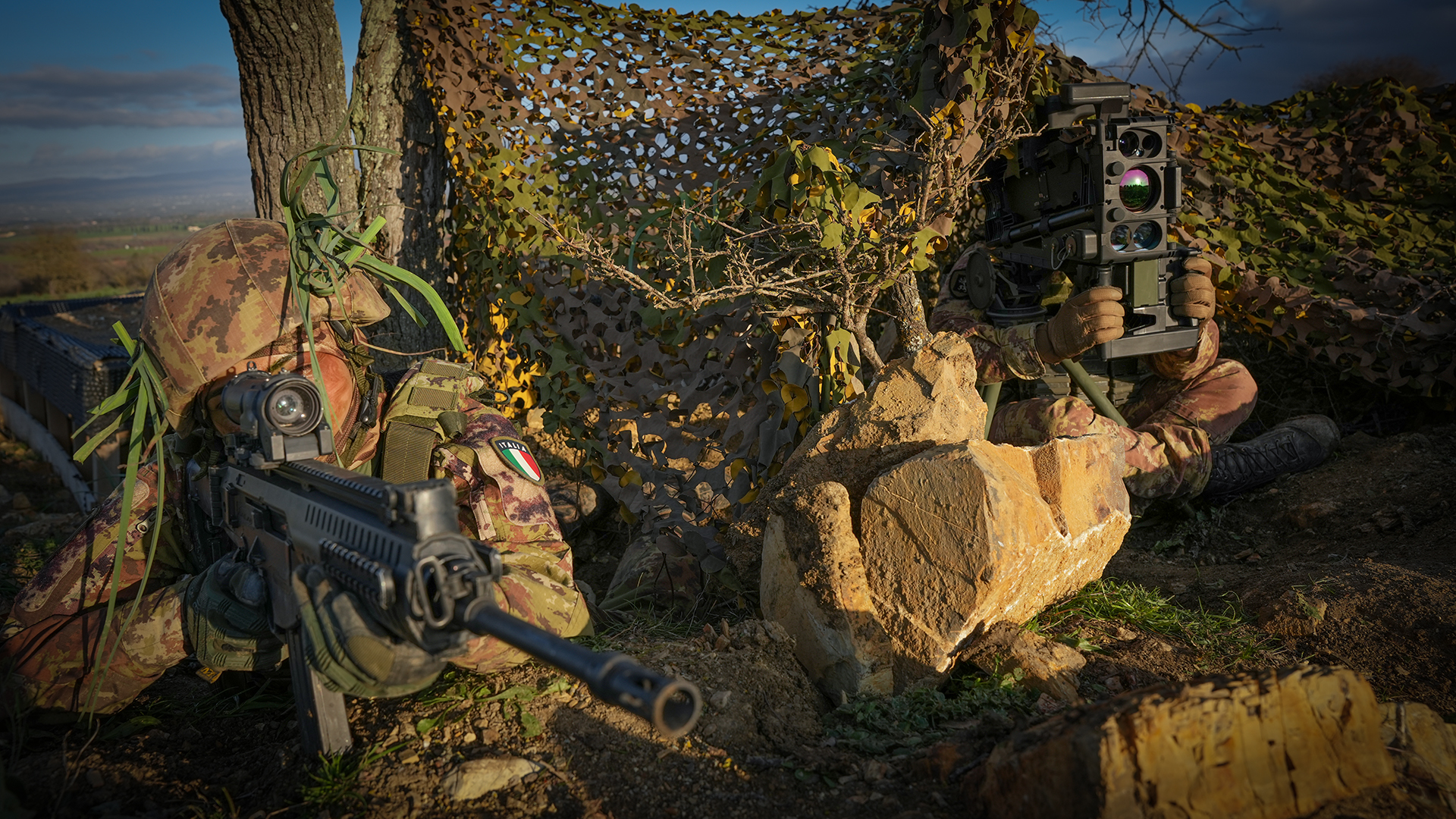
62nd Infantry Regiment "Sicilia" anti-tank team with a Spike anti-tank missile launcher

As of 2026 the 62nd Infantry Regiment "Sicilia" is organized as follows:

- 62nd Infantry Regiment "Sicilia", in Catania
  - Command and Logistic Support Company
  - 1st Mechanized Battalion
    - 1st Fusiliers Company
    - 2nd Fusiliers Company
    - 3rd Fusiliers Company
    - Maneuver Support Company

The regiment is equipped with VTLM Lince vehicles and scheduled to receive Freccia wheeled infantry fighting vehicles. The Maneuver Support Company is equipped with 120mm mortars and Spike anti-tank guided missiles.

== See also ==
- Mechanized Brigade "Aosta"
