= 11th Transport Battalion "Etnea" =

Inactive Italian Army transport unit

- 11° Battaglione Trasporti "Etnea"
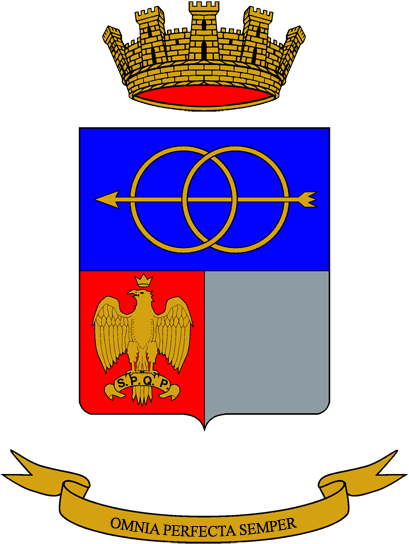
- Battalion coat of arms
- Active: 1 Oct. 1987 — 30 June 1998
- Country: Italy
- Branch: Italian Army
- Role: Military logistics
- Garrison/HQ: Palermo
- Motto: "Omnia perfecta semper"
- Anniversaries: 22 May 1916 - Battle of Asiago

Insignia
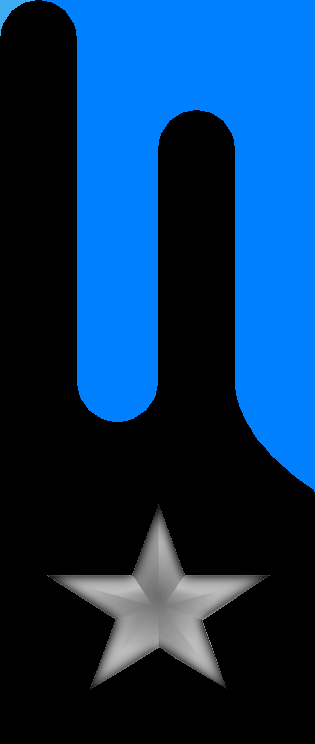
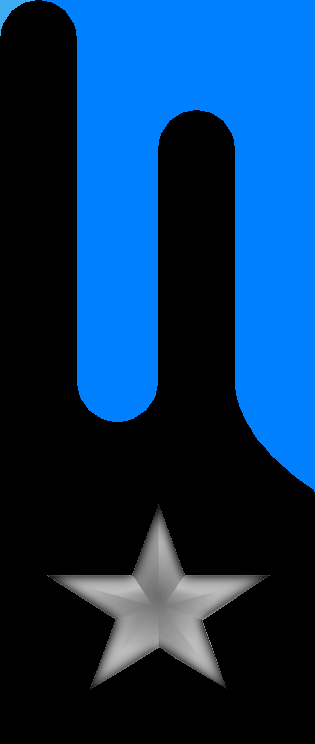
- Unit gorget patches

The 11th Transport Battalion "Etnea" (Italian: 11° Battaglione Trasporti "Etnea") is an inactive military logistics battalion of the Italian Army, which was based in Palermo in Sicily. Originally a transport regiment of the Royal Italian Army, the unit was last active from 1987 to 1998. The battalion's anniversary falls, as for all units of the Italian Army's Transport and Materiel Corps, on 22 May, the anniversary of the Royal Italian Army's first major use of automobiles to transport reinforcements to the Asiago plateau to counter the Austro-Hungarian Asiago Offensive in May 1916.

== History ==
=== Interwar years ===
In August 1920, the X Automobilistic Center was formed in Palermo and assigned to the X Army Corps. On 1 April 1923, the center was disbanded and its personnel and materiel used to form the X Auto Grouping, which consisted of a command, an auto group, a railway group, and a depot. On 1 November 1926, the grouping was disbanded and the next day its personnel and vehicles were used to form the 11th Automobilistic Center in Palermo. The center consisted of a command, the XI Automobilistic Group, and a depot. The three companies of the disbanded railway group were assigned to the 16th Field Artillery Regiment, 22nd Field Artillery Regiment, and 24th Field Artillery Regiment.

On 23 April 1928, the 11th Automobilistic Center was formed in Udine and assigned to the newly formed XI Army Corps. Consequently, on 1 October of the same year, the 11th Automobilistic Center in Palermo changed its name to 12th Automobilistic Center.

In 1935-36 the center mobilized the 16th Heavy Auto Group, and the 4th Special Auto Unit for the IV Truck-mounted Machine Gunners Group of the Regiment "Lancieri di Aosta" (6th) for the Second Italo-Ethiopian War.

=== World War II ===
On 1 July 1942, the 12th Automobilistic Center was renamed 12th Drivers Regiment. The regiment was declared lost due to wartime events on 22 July 1943, when the US Army's 3rd Infantry Division reached Palermo. During World War II the center mobilized in its depot in Palermo among others the following units:

- 13th Auto Grouping Command
- 16th Auto Grouping Command
- 55th Autobus Auto Group
- 153rd Mixed Auto Group
- 108th Light Auto Group
- 109th Light Auto Group
- 110th Light Auto Group
- 12th Auto Park
- 51st Auto Park

=== Cold War ===
On 1 March 1947, the 11th Drivers Center was formed in Palermo, which consisted of a command, the 11th Auto Unit, the 11th Vehicles Park, a fuel depot, and a depot. The center supported the XI Territorial Military Command of the Sicily Military Region. On 1 March 1949, the 11th Vehicles Park was transferred to the 11th Automotive Repair Shop. The unit was tasked with the transport of fuel, ammunition, and materiel between the military region's depots and the logistic supply points of the army's divisions and brigades. On 31 December 1964, the 11th Drivers Center was disbanded. The next day the 11th Auto Unit became an autonomous unit and was assigned to the XI Territorial Military Command.

As part of the 1975 army reform the unit was renamed 11th Mixed Maneuver Auto Unit.

On 1 October 1987, the 11th Mixed Maneuver Auto Unit was reorganized and renamed 11th Transport Battalion "Etnea". Transport battalions formed after the 1986 army reform were named after a landmark mountain in the military region's area of operations; in case of the 11th Transport Battalion for the Etna vulcano. On 13 July 1987, the President of the Italian Republic Francesco Cossiga granted the battalion a flag and assigned the battalion the traditions of the 12th Drivers Regiment. At the time the battalion consisted of a command, a command and services company, a mixed transport company, and a special transports company.

=== Recent times ===
On 30 June 1998, the 11th Transport Battalion "Etnea" was disbanded and the battalion's flag transferred to the Shrine of the Flags in the Vittoriano in Rome for safekeeping.

== See also ==
- Military logistics
