= 141st Infantry Regiment "Catanzaro" =

Inactive Italian Army infantry unit

- 141° Reggimento Fanteria "Catanzaro"
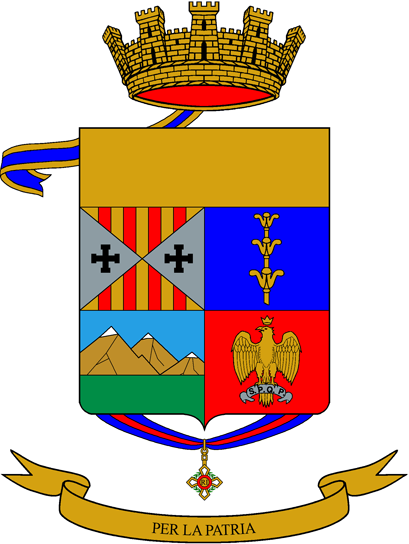
- Regimental coat of arms
- Active: 1 March 1915 – June 1920; 23 May 1940 – 5 Jan. 1941; 1 Oct. 1975 – 27 May 1995
- Country: Italy
- Branch: Italian Army
- Garrison/HQ: Pantelleria
- Motto: "Per la Patria"
- Anniversaries: 27 May 1916 – Battle of Monte Mosciagh
- Decorations: 1× Military Order of Italy; 1× Gold Medal of Military Valor

Insignia
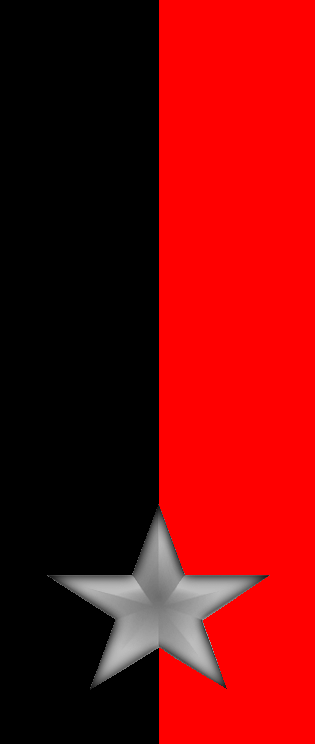
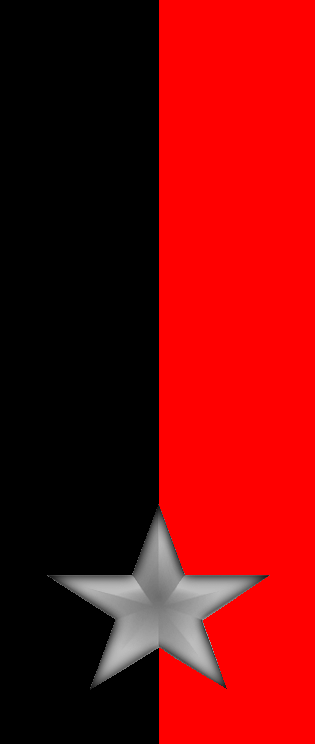
- Regimental gorget patches

The 141st Infantry Regiment "Catanzaro" (Italian: 141° Reggimento Fanteria "Catanzaro") is an inactive unit of the Italian Army last based on the island of Pantelleria. The regiment is named for the city of Catanzaro and part of the Italian Army's infantry arm.

The regiment was formed in preparation for Italy's entry into World War I. During the war the regiment fought on the Italian front and was awarded Italy's highest military honor the Gold Medal of Military Valor. After the war the regiment was disbanded. In May 1940 regiment was reformed in preparation for Italy's entry into World War II. The regiment was assigned to the 64th Infantry Division "Catanzaro", which was transferred to Italian Libya. In September 1940, the Catanzaro division participated in the Italian invasion of Egypt, but the division and regiment were destroyed in January 1941 in the Battle of Bardia. In 1975 the regiment was reformed as a battalion sized motorized unit. In 1991, the battalion moved to Pantelleria to oversee units rotating to the island. In 1995 the battalion was disbanded.

== History ==
=== Formation ===
On 1 January 1915 the 142nd Infantry Regiment (Brigade "Catanzaro") was formed in Cosenza by the regimental depot of the 19th Infantry Regiment (Brigade "Brescia"). On 1 March 1915 the 141st Infantry Regiment (Brigade "Catanzaro") and the command of the Brigade "Catanzaro" were formed in Catanzaro by the regimental depot of the 48th Infantry Regiment (Brigade "Ferrara"). The brigade consisted of personnel levied in Calabria. Both regiments consisted of three battalions, which each fielded four fusilier companies and one machine gun section. The Brigade "Catanzaro" formed, together with the Brigade "Bari", the 28th Division.

=== World War I ===
During World War I the Brigade "Catanzaro" fought on the Italian front: from July to August 1915 the brigades was deployed on the Karst plateau, where it participated in the Second Battle of the Isonzo. In January 1916 the brigade fought at Oslavia and in May on the slopes of Monte Mosciagh. In August 1916 the brigade was back on Karst plateau for the Sixth Battle of the Isonzo fighting on the slopes of Monte San Michele and for the summit of Nad Logem. On 28 December 1916 the King of Italy Victor Emmanuel III awarded the 141st Infantry Regiment Italy's highest military honor, the Gold Medal of Military Valor, for the regiment's conduct during the Sixth Battle of the Isonzo.

In February 1917 the infantry regiments of the Brigade "Catanzaro" ceded both two companies to help from the infantry regiments of the newly formed Brigade "Murge". In May 1917 the brigade fought in the Tenth Battle of the Isonzo for the summit of Lukatic and in August of the same year the brigade fought in the Eleventh Battle of the Isonzo on the slopes of Monte Ermada. In 1918 the brigade had been transferred to the Sette Comuni front and operated in the Val d'Astico and Val Posina valleys. After the war the brigade and its two regiments were disbanded in June 1920.

=== World War II ===
On 23 May 1940 the 141st Infantry Regiment "Catanzaro" was reformed in Modena. Due to the urgent need to reinforce Italian units deployed in Libya the regiment's units were formed by three different regimental depots:

- Regimental Command and II Battalion and by the depot of the 36th Infantry Regiment "Pistoia" in Modena
- I Battalion by the depot of the 77th Infantry Regiment "Lupi di Toscana" in Brescia
- III Battalion by the depot of the 80th Infantry Regiment "Roma" in Mantua

The regiment immediately deployed to Libya, where it landed in Derna on 3 June 1940. One the same date the 64th Infantry Division "Catanzaro" was formed in Acroma in Libya with the 141st and 142nd infantry regiments and the 203rd Artillery Regiment. The latter regiment had been part of the disbanded 3rd CC.NN. Division "21 Aprile", whose minor units and equipment were also transferred to the Catanzaro. After its arrival in Libya the regiment consisted of a command, a command company, three fusilier battalions, a support weapons battery equipped with 65/17 infantry support guns, and a mortar company equipped with 81mm Mod. 35 mortars.

On 10 June 1940 Italy entered World War II and the Catanzaro division assembled at Acroma to guard the approach to Tobruk. On 9 September 1940 the Italian invasion of Egypt commenced and on 13 September the division followed the bulk of the 10th Army's into British Egypt. There the division was split in smaller units, which manned positions between in the Buqbuq sector between Sallum and Sidi Barrani.

On 8 December 1940 the British began Operation Compass and by 13–14 December the Catanzaro division was forced to retreated to Sallum, and on 15 December to the defensive perimeter of Bardia. What remained of the division was completely destroyed in the Battle of Bardia by 5 January 1941.

=== Cold War ===
During the 1975 army reform the army disbanded the regimental level and newly independent battalions were granted for the first time their own flags. On 30 September 1975 the 5th Infantry Regiment "Aosta" was disbanded and the next day the regiment's III Battalion in Palermo became an autonomous unit and was renamed 141st Motorized Infantry Battalion "Catanzaro". The battalion was assigned to the Motorized Brigade "Aosta" and consisted of a command, a command and services company, three motorized companies, and a heavy mortar company equipped with towed 120mm Mod. 63 mortars. At the time the battalion fielded 844 men (41 officers, 94 non-commissioned officers, and 709 soldiers). On 12 November 1976, the President of the Italian Republic Giovanni Leone assigned with decree 846 the flag and traditions of the 141st Infantry Regiment "Catanzaro" to the 141st Motorized Infantry Battalion "Catanzaro".

=== Recent times ===
As retaliation for the 1986 United States bombing of Libya the Libyans fired Scud missiles at the United States Coast Guard LORAN-C transmitter on the island of Lampedusa. After the attack the Italian Army formed the Minor Islands Battalion (Italian: Battaglione Isole Minori) on the island of Pantelleria to guard and defend the islands of Pantelleria, Lampedusa and the Pelagian Islands. On 21 April 1991 the 141st Motorized Infantry Battalion "Catanzaro" was disbanded in Palermo and its name, flag and traditions transferred to the Minor Islands Battalion, which was renamed 141st Infantry Battalion "Catanzaro". The battalion's main base was in Pantelleria with a company detached to Lampedusa.

On 27 May 1995 the battalion was disbanded and on 30 May the flag of the 141st Infantry Regiment "Catanzaro" was transferred to the Shrine of the Flags in the Vittoriano in Rome.
