= 6th Infantry Regiment "Aosta" =

- 6° Reggimento Fanteria "Aosta"
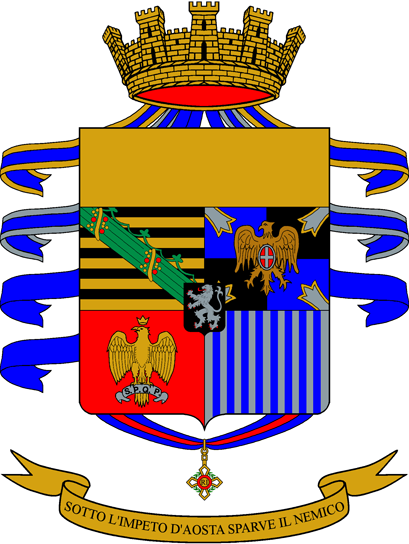
- Regimental coat of arms
- Active: 20 Feb. 1690 – 15 June 1955; 1 Oct. 2022 – today
- Country: Italy
- Branch: Italian Army
- Part of: Mechanized Brigade "Aosta"
- Garrison/HQ: Messina
- Motto: "Sotto l'impeto d'Aosta sparve il nemico"
- Anniversaries: 26 November 1917 – Battle of Col della Berretta
- Decorations: 1× Military Order of Italy; 2× Gold Medals of Military Valor; 2× Silver Medal of Military Valor; 3× Bronze Medal of Military Valor

Insignia
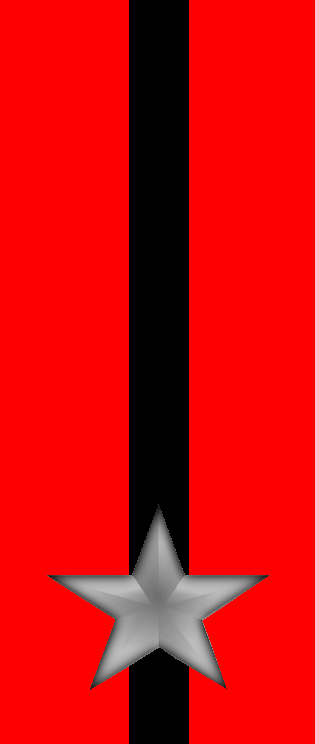
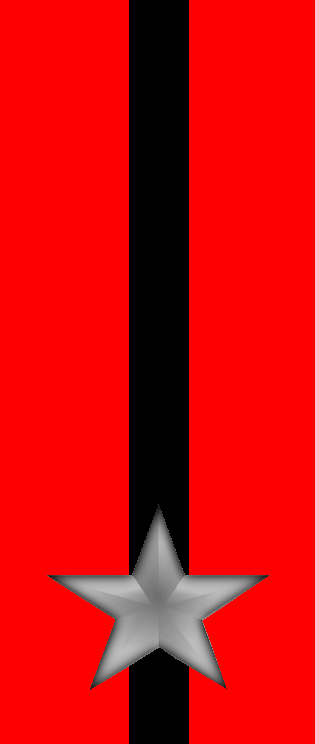
- Regimental gorget patches

The 6th Infantry Regiment "Aosta" (Italian: 6° Reggimento Fanteria "Aosta") is an active unit of the Italian Army based in Messina in Sicily. The unit is part of the Italian army's infantry corps and operationally assigned to the Mechanized Brigade "Aosta".

== History ==
The origins of the 6th Infantry Regiment "Aosta" date back to 1690 in the Savoyard state.

=== Savoyard state ===
On 20 February 1690, the Fusiliers Regiment of His Royal Highness was established by Duke Victor Amadeus II. The Regiment was recruited and led by Colonel Giuseppe Filiberto Costa, Count of Trinità, as Ordnance Infantry Regiment to provide escort and protection to the artillery. The Regiment was based in Vercelli. On 16 September 1774, the Regiment assumed the name of the Regiment "Aosta". The Regiment fought in the Nine Years' War (from its establishment in 1690 to 1697), the War of the Spanish Succession, the War of the Quadruple Alliance (1718 to 1719), the War of the Polish Succession, the War of the Austrian Succession (from 1742 to 1748) and of the French invasion of Piedmont.

In December 1798 the Regiment "Aosta", together with the regiments "Savoia" and "Lombardia", formed the 1st Line Half Brigade, which was disbanded with its regiments in May 1799 due to Revolutionary France occupying Piedmont and forcing Charles Emmanuel IV of Sardinia to abdicate the throne in favor of the Piedmontese Republic.

With the defeat of Napoleon at the Battle of Leipzig and the restoration of the Kingdom of Sardinia in 1814 the regiment was reformed. On 1 November 1815 it was renamed Brigade "Aosta". On 25 October 1831 the brigade split to form the 1st and 2nd infantry regiments under the brigade's command. On 4 May 1839 the two regiments were re-numbered as 5th and 6th infantry regiments.

=== Kingdom of Italy ===
The Brigade "Aosta" with its two regiments was engaged in the First Italian War of Independence, for which its two regiments were decorated with a Silver Medal of Military Valor. In 1859 the brigade fought in the Second Italian War of Independence, for which its two regiments were decorated with a Gold Medal of Military Valor and then participated in the repression of Brigandage in Southern Italy in 1861 and in Aspromonte in 1862. For these operations the two regiments were decorated with a Bronze Medal of Military Valor. In 1866 the brigade participated in the Third Italian War of Independence.

On 15 October 1871, the brigade command was disbanded and the regiment was renamed 6th Infantry Regiment "Aosta". The new denomination lasted until 1881, when the regiment was renamed 6th Regiment (Brigade "Aosta"), due to the reintroduction of brigades in the Royal Italian Army.

The regiment also provided personnel for the First Italo-Ethiopian War and the Italo-Turkish War.

=== World War I ===
At the outbreak of World War I, the Brigade "Aosta" formed, together with the Brigade "Verona" and the 22nd Field Artillery Regiment, the 23rd Division. At the time the 6th Infantry Regiment consisted of three battalions, each of which fielded four fusilier companies and one machine gun section. After Italy's entry into the war the Brigade "Aosta" assembled in Gemona. The 6th Regiment was the first to see action on the Italian front when it tried to conquer the Plöcken Pass on 3 July 1916. In 1916 the brigade was engaged in combat in the region of Kras. From 22 to 26 November 1917 the brigade defended the summit of Col della Berretta on the Monte Grappa massif during the Battle of Monte Grappa, which put an end the Austrian offensive after the Battle of Caporetto.

Between 24 and 28 October 1918 the brigade conquered the summit of Monte Valderoa and held it against repeated Austrian counterattacks. For this last engagement of the war the brigade's two regiments were awarded their second Gold Medal of Military Valor.

=== Interwar years ===
In November 1926 the Brigade "Aosta" assumed the name of XXVIII Infantry Brigade and received the 85th Infantry Regiment "Verona". The brigade was the infantry component of the 28th Territorial Division of Palermo, which also included the 22nd Artillery Regiment.

On 15 April 1939 the XXVIII Infantry Brigade was dissolved and the two "Aosta" infantry regiments came under direct command of the division, which changed its name to 28th Infantry Division "Aosta".

=== World War II ===
After Italy's entry into World War II the 28th Infantry Division "Aosta" remained in Sicily and was tasked with coastal and airport defence in the Western half of the island.

After the Allied landings at Syracuse on 9 July 1943 the division's positions were considered untenable and it retreated to the centre of the island to link up with the 26th Infantry Division "Assietta". On 1–6 August 1943 the Aosta was badly mauled by US Army troops during the Battle of Troina in the North of the island. The remnants of the division retreated to Messina, from where they were evacuated to Trento in Northern Italy between 9 and 12 August 1943. The division was officially declared lost on 18 August 1943. The remnants of the division in Trento were disbanded by invading German forces after the announcement of the Armistice of Cassibile on 8 September 1943.

On 20 September 1944 the Italian Co-Belligerent Army formed in Sicily the III and IV internal security brigades with the regiments of the disbanded 47th Infantry Division "Bari". On 14 October 1944 the two brigades entered the newly activated Internal Security Division "Aosta", which was tasked with public duties, demining and airfield protection tasks until the end of the war.

=== Cold War ===
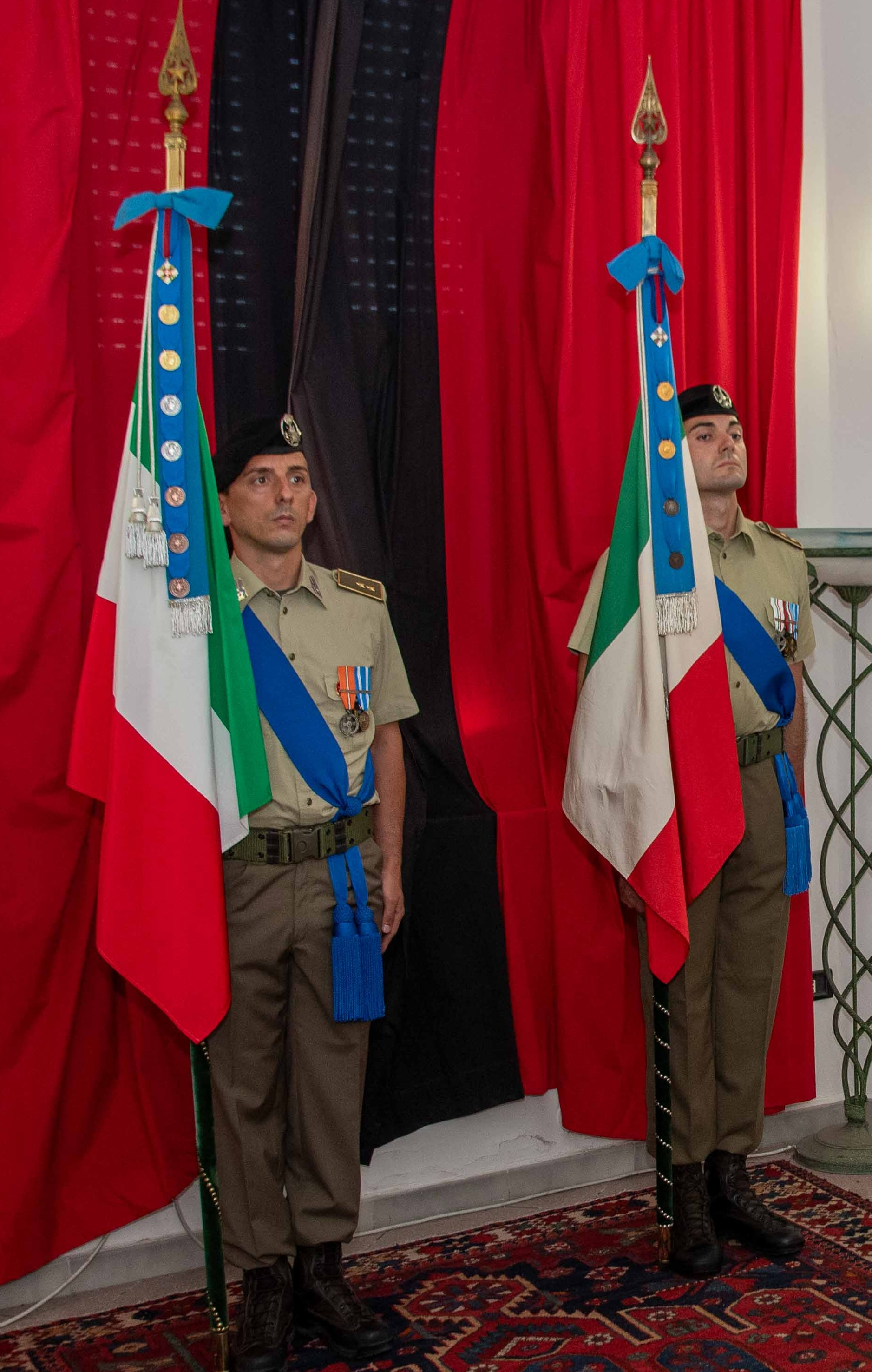
Flags of the 5th Infantry Regiment "Aosta" (on the right) and 6th Infantry Regiment "Aosta" (on the left)

On 15 August 1946 the Internal Security Division "Aosta" was reorganized as Infantry Brigade "Aosta". With the expansion of the Italian Army after World War II the brigade was expanded to full division on 1 February 1948, with the 5th Infantry Regiment "Aosta", 6th Infantry Regiment "Aosta", 45th Infantry Regiment "Reggio", and 46th Infantry Regiment "Reggio". Following a revision of strategy the 6th Infantry Regiment "Aosta" and 45th Infantry Regiment "Reggio"were disbanded on 15 June 1955.

=== Reactivation ===
On 1 October 2022, the name, flag and traditions of the 6th Infantry Regiment "Aosta" were assigned to the Command and Tactical Supports Unit "Aosta" of the Mechanized Brigade "Aosta". On the same day the unit was renamed 6th Command and Tactical Supports Unit "Aosta".

== Organization ==
As of 2023 the unit is organized as follows:

- 6th Command and Tactical Supports Unit "Aosta", in Messina
  - Command Company
  - Signal Company

== See also ==
- Mechanized Brigade "Aosta"
