= 24th Field Artillery Regiment "Peloritani" =

Active Italian Army field artillery unit

- 24° Reggimento Artiglieria Terrestre "Peloritani"
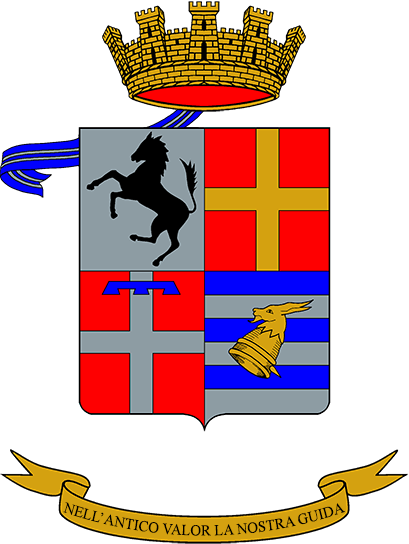
- Regimental coat of arms
- Active: 1 Nov. 1888 – 11 Sept. 1943; 1 March 1951 – 21 Feb. 1961; 1 Oct. 1975 – today
- Country: Italy
- Branch: Italian Army
- Part of: Mechanized Brigade "Aosta"
- Garrison/HQ: Messina
- Motto: "Nell'antico valor la nostra guida"
- Anniversaries: 15 June 1918 – Second Battle of the Piave River
- Decorations: 1× War Cross of Military Valor

Insignia
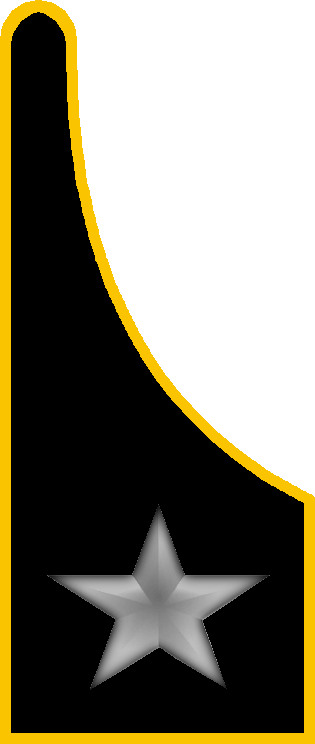
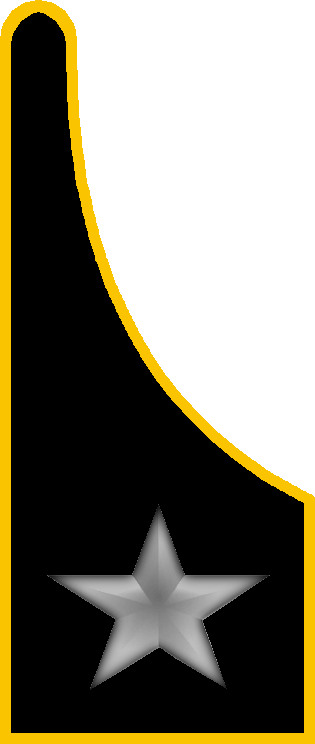
- Regimental gorget patches

The 24th Field Artillery Regiment "Peloritani" (Italian: 24° Reggimento Artiglieria Terrestre "Peloritani") is a field artillery regiment of the Italian Army. Today the regiment is based in Messina in Sicily and assigned to the Mechanized Brigade "Aosta". Originally an artillery regiment of the Royal Italian Army, the regiment was formed in 1888 and served in World War I on the Italian front. In 1935 the regiment was assigned to the 29th Infantry Division "Peloritana", which fought in the Second Italo-Ethiopian War. In 1939 the division was renamed as the 29th Infantry Division "Piemonte". The division participated in the Greco-Italian War and then remained in Yugoslavia on anti-partisan duty. The division and regiment were located on the Peloponnese peninsula, when the Armistice of Cassibile was announced on 8 September 1943. The division and its units surrendered to attacking German forces on 11 September.

The regiment was reformed in 1951 and assigned to the Infantry Division "Aosta", which in 1961 was reduced to Infantry Brigade "Aosta". The same year the regiment was disbanded and its flag transferred to the Shrine of the Flags in the Vittoriano in Rome. On 1 October 1975 the Field Artillery Group "Aosta" was renamed 24th Field Artillery Group "Peloritani" and assigned the flag and traditions of the 24th Artillery Regiment "Piemonte". The group was assigned to the Motorized Brigade "Aosta". In 1992 group was equipped with M109G self-propelled howitzers and reorganized as 24th Self-propelled Field Artillery Regiment "Peloritani". The regimental anniversary falls, as for all Italian Army artillery regiments, on June 15, the beginning of the Second Battle of the Piave River in 1918.

== History ==
On 1 November 1888 the 24th Field Artillery Regiment was formed in Naples. The new regiment consisted of eight batteries and one train company ceded by the 12th Field Artillery Regiment. In 1895–96 the regiment provided six officers and 55 troops to units deployed to Eritrea for the First Italo-Ethiopian War. During the Italo-Turkish War in 1911–12 the regiment formed the command of a Special Field Artillery Regiment, which was sent with one of the regiment's group commands and the regiment's 4th and 5th batteries to Libya. The regiment also provided eight officers and 795 troops to other deployed units. On 1 January 1915 the regiment ceded its III Group to help form the 34th Field Artillery Regiment.

=== World War I ===
At the outbreak of World War I the regiment was assigned, together with the Brigade "Siena" and Brigade "Bologna", to the 19th Division. At the time the regiment consisted of a command, three groups with a combined eight batteries equipped with 75/27 mod. 06 field guns, two reserve pack batteries with 70/15 mountain guns, and a depot. During the war the regiment's depot formed the command of the 52nd Field Artillery Regiment, the 112th and 113th mountain batteries, and four siege batteries. In 1915 the regiment fought in the Second Battle of the Isonzo on Monte Sei Busi and then in the Third Battle of the Isonzo and Fourth Battle of the Isonzo at Castelnuovo del Carso. In 1916 the regiment was deployed in July and August on the Monte Cimone di Tonezza and then on the Pečinka and Veliki Hribach. In March 1916 the regiment's I Group with three batteries was part of the Italian force that occupied Southern Albania. The group returned to Italy on 7 August 1916 and rejoined the regiment. In June 1917 the regiment was at Kostanjevica na Krasu during the Tenth Battle of the Isonzo. During the retreat to the Piave river after the Battle of Caporetto the regiment fought delaying actions along the Tagliamento river and then participated in the First Battle of the Piave River. In 1918 the regiment fought on Cima Ekar and Monte Valbella during the Second Battle of the Piave River, and again on Monte Valbella and then on the Melette during the Battle of Vittorio Veneto.

After the war the regiment transferred its base from Naples to Schio in Italy's North, while the regiment's 5th Battery was sent to Tripolitania to help suppress local revolts. In 1920 the regiment left Schio and returned to Naples, where on 1 August 1920 the 24th Field Artillery Regiment was reorganized as 8th Heavy Field Artillery Regiment. On the same date the 36th Field Artillery Regiment in Messina changed its number to 24th and received the traditions of the disbanded regiment. In 1926 the 24th Field Artillery Regiment was assigned to the 29th Territorial Division of Messina and consisted of a command, one group with 100/17 mod. 14 howitzers, two groups with 75/27 mod. 11 field guns, one group with mule-carried 75/13 mod. 15 mountain guns, and a depot.

=== Second Italo-Ethiopian War ===
In January 1935 the division changed its name to 29th Infantry Division "Peloritana" and consequently the regiment changed its name to 24th Artillery Regiment "Peloritana". On 28 February 1935 the division and regiment were mobilized in preparation for the Second Italo-Ethiopian War. The regiment departed Italy with its command, a command battery, the I and II groups with 75/27 mod. 11 field guns, and the III Group with 75/13 mod. 15 mountain guns. The I Group had been transferred for the duration of the war from the 22nd Artillery Regiment "Vespri" of the 28th Infantry Division "Aosta".

After arriving in Somalia in March 1935 the division garrisoned the coastal regions until March 1936, when it entered combat by seizing Harar on the Erer river. In the final Italian advance in April 1936 the division was relegated to second-line duties. After the war's conclusion the Peloritana remained in Harar and fought remnants of Ethiopian forces and resistance fighters. The division and its regiments returned to Italy in December 1936.

On 15 April 1939 the division was renamed 29th Infantry Division "Piemonte" and consequently the regiment changed its name to 24th Artillery Regiment "Piemonte".

=== World War II ===
On 10 June 1940, the day Italy entered World War II, the regiment consisted of a command, command unit, the I Group with 100/17 mod. 14 howitzers, the II Group with 75/27 mod. 11 field guns, the III Group with 75/13 mod. 15 mountain guns, and an anti-aircraft battery with 20/65 mod. 35 anti-aircraft guns. The regiment was assigned to the 29th Infantry Division "Piemonte", which also included the 3rd Infantry Regiment "Piemonte" and 4th Infantry Regiment "Piemonte". In September 1940 the regiment transferred its II Group with 75/27 mod. 11 field guns to the 22nd Artillery Regiment "Aosta" of the 28th Infantry Division "Aosta", and received from the 22nd Artillery Regiment "Aosta" a group with 75/13 mod. 15 mountain guns.

In September 1940 the division moved from Sicily to Albania. In October 1940 the division participated in the Greco-Italian War. For its conduct in the Greco-Italian War the 24th Artillery Regiment "Piemonte" was awarded a War Cross of Military Valor, which was affixed to the regiment's flag and is depicted on the regiment's coat of arms. After the war the division was temporarily based in Korçë before moving in June 1941 to the Peloponnese peninsula. The division garrisoned Patras, Aigio, Paralia Platanos, Pyrgos. After the announcement of the Armistice of Cassibile on 8 September 1943 the division was disbanded by attacking German forces on 11 September 1943.

=== Cold War ===
On 1 March 1951 the 24th Field Artillery Regiment was reformed in Messina and consisted of a command, command unit, and the I and II groups with M101 105 mm howitzers. The regiment was assigned to the Infantry Division "Aosta" and soon formed a third group with M101 105 mm howitzers. On 1 March 1953 the regiment formed the V Light Anti-aircraft Group with 40/56 autocannons and on 18 June of the same year the 22nd Heavy Field Artillery Regiment transferred its I Group with QF 25-pounder field guns to the 24th Field Artillery Regiment. The new group was renumbered as II Group, while the regiment's own II Group was renumbered as IV Group and re-equipped with M114 155 mm howitzers. Afterwards the regiment consisted of the following units:

- 24th Field Artillery Regiment, in Messina
  - I Group with M101 105 mm howitzers
  - II Group with QF 25-pounder field guns
  - III Group with M101 105 mm howitzers
  - IV Group with M114 155 mm howitzers
  - V Light Anti-aircraft Group with 40/56 autocannons

In 1955 regiment was reduced in size and 15 June it consisted of a command, a command unit, the I Group with QF 25-pounder field guns, and the III Mixed Group, which fielded two batteries with M114 155 mm howitzers and two light anti-aircraft batteries with 40/56 autocannons. On 29 April 1957 the regiment formed a Light Aircraft Section with L-21B artillery observation planes, which the regiment transferred on 1 August of the same year to the 22nd Heavy Field Artillery Regiment. On 18 December 1958 the Light Aircraft Section returned to the regiment as the 22nd Heavy Field Artillery Regiment was disbanded on 31 December 1958.

The regiment entered 1959 with a reduced mixed group, which now fielded one battery with M114 155 mm howitzers and one light anti-aircraft battery with 40/56 autocannons. On 1 October 1960 the Light Aircraft Section was transferred to the command of the division. In 1961 the Infantry Division "Aosta" was reduced to Infantry Brigade "Aosta" and consequently on 21 February 1961 the regiment was disbanded. The next day the regiment's I Group, which was re-equipped with 105/14 mod. 56 pack howitzers, and the Mixed Group's Light Anti-aircraft Battery formed the Field Artillery Group "Aosta" in Messina. The group inherited the traditions of the 24th Artillery Regiment "Piemonte", but not the regiment's flag, which was transferred to the Shrine of the Flags in the Vittoriano in Rome. In 1964 the group was equipped with 105/22 mod. 14/61 howitzers.

During the 1975 army reform the army disbanded the regimental level and newly independent battalions and groups were granted for the first time their own flags. On 1 October 1975 the Field Artillery Group "Aosta" was renamed 24th Field Artillery Group "Peloritani". To avoid confusion with the support units of the Motorized Brigade "Aosta" the group was named for the regiment's original name, the Peloritani mountains to the West of Messina. The group was assigned to the Motorized Brigade "Aosta" and consisted of a command, a command and services battery, and three batteries with towed M114 155 mm howitzers.

On 12 November 1976 the President of the Italian Republic Giovanni Leone assigned with decree 846 the flag and traditions of the 24th Artillery Regiment "Piemonte" to the group. At the time the group fielded 485 men (37 officers, 58 non-commissioned officers, and 390 soldiers).

=== Recent times ===
In 1991, after the end of the Cold War, the Italian Army disbanded many of its artillery units in the country's Northeast and transferred their equipment to the remaining artillery units. In 1992 the 24th Field Artillery Group "Peloritani" received M109G 155 mm self-propelled howitzers. On 5 October 1992 the group lost its autonomy and the next day entered the reformed 24th Self-propelled Field Artillery Regiment "Peloritani". The regiment was assigned to the Mechanized Brigade "Aosta". In 2001 the regiment was renamed 24th Field Artillery Regiment "Peloritani" and in 2016 it was equipped with FH-70 155 mm howitzers.

== Organization ==
As of 2023 the 24th Field Artillery Regiment "Peloritani" is organized as follows:

- 24th Field Artillery Regiment "Peloritani", in Messina
  - Command and Logistic Support Battery
  - Surveillance, Target Acquisition and Tactical Liaison Battery
  - 1st Artillery Group
    - 1st Howitzer Battery
    - 2nd Howitzer Battery
    - 3rd Howitzer Battery
    - Fire and Technical Support Battery

The regiment is equipped with FH-70 towed howitzers.

== See also ==
- Mechanized Brigade "Aosta"
