= 7th Tank Battalion "M.O. Di Dio" =

Active Italian Army tank unit

- 7° Battaglione Carri "M.O. Di Dio"
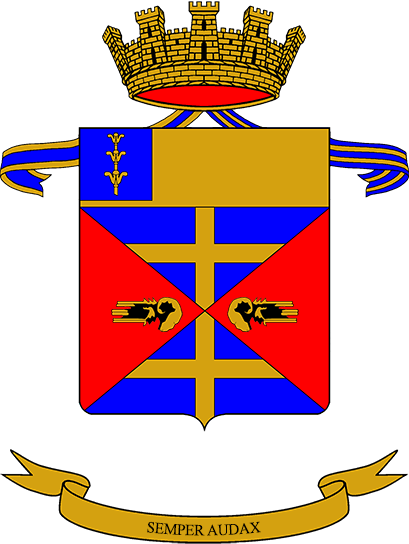
- Battalion coat of arms
- Active: 30 Jan. 1941 — 8 Jan. 1942; 1 Feb. 1959 — 31 May 1991; 1 Oct. 2022 — today
- Country: Italy
- Branch: Italian Army
- Part of: 132nd Armored Brigade "Ariete"
- Garrison/HQ: Pordenone
- Motto: "Semper audax"
- Anniversaries: 1 October 1927
- Decorations: 1x Gold Medal of Military Valor; 1x Bronze Medal of Army Valor

Insignia
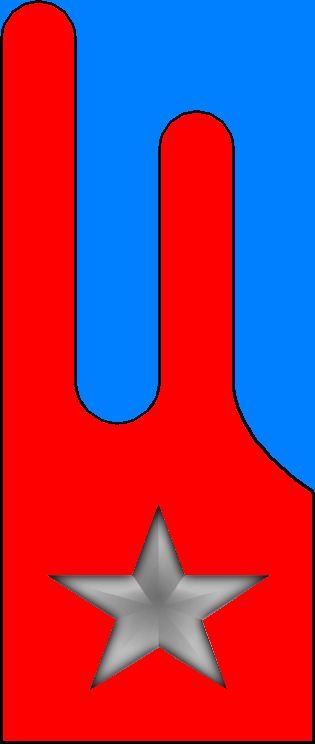
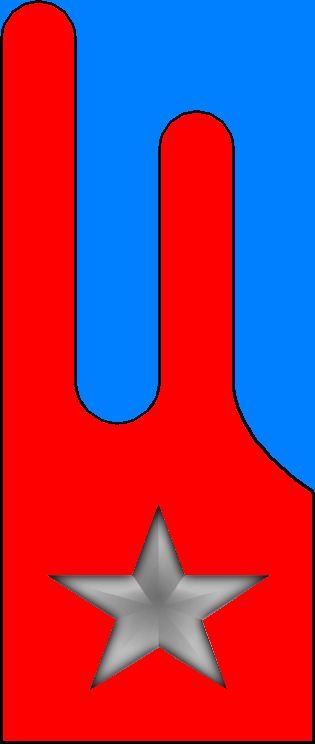
- Tank units gorget patches

The 7th Tank Battalion "M.O. Di Dio" (Italian: 7° Battaglione Carri "M.O. Di Dio") is an active tank battalion of the Italian Army, which is based in Pordenone in Friuli-Venezia Giulia and operationally assigned to the 132nd Armored Brigade "Ariete". The unit's lineage traces back to the World War II VII Tank Battalion M13/40, which was formed, on 30 January 1941, by the depot of the 32nd Tank Infantry Regiment. The battalion was sent to Libya, where it fought, initially with the 32nd Tank Infantry Regiment and then the 132nd Tank Infantry Regiment, in the Western Desert campaign. The battalion was disbanded on 8 January 1942, due to the losses it had suffered in the British Operation Crusader. In 1959, the battalion was reformed and assigned to the 132nd Tank Regiment. In 1963, the battalion was transferred to the 8th Bersaglieri Regiment. In 1975, the battalion was renamed 7th Tank Battalion "M.O. Di Dio" and assigned to the 8th Mechanized Brigade "Garibaldi". In 1991, the battalion was disbanded. On 1 October 2022, the flag and traditions of the battalion were assigned to the Command and Tactical Supports Unit "Ariete" of the 132nd Armored Brigade "Ariete".

Originally the unit, like all Italian tank units, was part of the army's infantry arm, but on 1 June 1999 the tankers specialty was transferred from the infantry arm to the cavalry arm. The battalion's anniversary falls, as for all tank units, which have not yet distinguished themselves in the battle, on 1 October 1927, the day the tankers speciality was founded.

== History ==
=== World War II ===
On 30 January 1941, the depot of the 32nd Tank Infantry Regiment in Verona disbanded the IV Tank Battalion L and used its personnel to form the VII Tank Battalion M13/40 (with M standing for Italian: "Medio" or Medium). The new battalion was equipped with M13/40 tanks. On 15 February 1941, the battalion was sent to Libya for the Western Desert campaign. After its arrival in Libya, the battalion was assigned to the 32nd Tank Infantry Regiment of the 132nd Armored Division "Ariete". In 1941, the 32nd Tank Infantry Regiment fought in Operation Sonnenblume and then in the Siege of Tobruk. On 1 September 1941, the battalion was transferred to the 132nd Tank Infantry Regiment, which had just arrived in North Africa. On 18 November 1941, the British Eighth Army commenced Operation Crusader, during which the battalion fought heavy battles at Bir el Gubi on 19 November and on 4-7 December and at Point 175 before retreating West. On 8 January 1942, the VII Tank Battalion M13/40 was disbanded due to the heavy casualties it had taken during Operation Crusader. The battalion's survivors were assigned to the remaining two tank battalions of the 132nd Tank Infantry Regiment.

=== Cold War ===
On 15 March 1948, the Italian Army's Tank School in Rome formed the I Tank Battalion, which was equipped with M4 Sherman tanks. On 10 July 1948, the school reformed the 1st Tankers Regiment and formed the II Tank Battalion. On 7 September of the same year, the regiment was assigned to the Armored Brigade "Ariete", which had been formed on 1 June 1948. On 1 April 1949, the 1st Tankers Regiment was renamed 132nd Tankers Regiment. On 28 April 1950, the regiment moved from Rome to Aviano in Friuli-Venezia Giulia. On 1 October 1952, the Armored Brigade "Ariete" was expanded to Armored Division "Ariete". On 5 January 1959, the regiment was renamed 132nd Tank Regiment and, on 5 February of the same year, the regiment's I, II, and III tank battalions were redesignated as VII, VIII, and X tank battalions. The three battalions were equipped with M26 Pershing tanks.

In 1963, the Armored Division "Ariete" adapted its organization to NATO standards and added a brigade level to the division's organization. On 1 January 1963, the III Armored Brigade "Ariete" was formed in Maniago and the 132nd Tank Regiment, as well as support forces, joined the new brigade. On 1 July 1963, the 8th Bersaglieri Regiment transferred its V Battalion to the 132nd Tank Regiment, which in turn transferred on the same date its VII Tank Battalion to the 8th Bersaglieri Regiment. Upon entering the 132nd Tank Regiment the V Battalion was redesignated as XXXVIII Bersaglieri Battalion. During the same year the VII Tank Battalion moved from Aviano to Pordenone, and in 1965 the battalion moved to Vivaro. On 1 October 1968, the brigade headquarters were disbanded, however the VII Tank Battalion and XXXVIII Bersaglieri Battalion did not return to their original regiments.

During the 1975 army reform the army disbanded the regimental level and newly independent battalions were granted for the first time their own flags, respectively in the case of cavalry units, their own standard. On 31 October 1975, the 8th Bersaglieri Regiment was disbanded and the next day the regiment's VII Tank Battalion in Vivaro became an autonomous unit and was renamed 7th Tank Battalion "M.O. Di Dio". As part of the reform tank and armored battalions were named for officers, soldiers and partisans of the tank speciality, who had served in World War II and been awarded Italy's highest military honor the Gold Medal of Military Valor. The 7th Tank Battalion was named for Lieutenant Alfredo Di Dio, who, while serving as a tank instructor in the 1st Tank Infantry Regiment, requested on 8 September 1943, the day the Armistice of Cassibile was announced, that the 1st Tank Infantry Regiment fight invading German forces. When his request was denied, Alfredo Di Dio together with his brother Officer Cadet Antonio Di Dio formed one of the first partisan units in Piedmont. On 13 February 1944, Antonio Di Dio and Captain Filippo Beltrami of the 27th Artillery Regiment "Cuneo" were killed in a firefight with the German 12th SS Police Regiment in Megolo. On 12 October 1944, also Alfredo Di Dio died in combat against German troops in Gola di Finero. All three men, Captain Filippo Beltrami, Lieutenant Alfredo Di Dio, and Officer Cadet Antonio Di Dio, were posthumously awarded Italy's highest military honor the Gold Medal of Military Valor.

On the same day, 1 November 1975, the 8th Bersaglieri Regiment's III Bersaglieri Battalion and XII Bersaglieri Battalion became also autonomous units and were renamed 3rd Bersaglieri Battalion "Cernaia", respectively 26th Bersaglieri Battalion "Castelfidardo". The two battalions were assigned, together with the 7th Tank Battalion "M.O. Di Dio", to the 8th Mechanized Brigade "Garibaldi", which was formed on the same date by reorganizing the command of the 8th Bersaglieri Regiment. The 7th Tank Battalion "M.O. Di Dio" consisted of a command, a command and services company, and three tank companies with M60A1 Patton main battle tanks. The battalion fielded now 434 men (32 officers, 82 non-commissioned officers, and 320 soldiers).

On 12 November 1976, the President of the Italian Republic Giovanni Leone granted with decree 846 the 7th Tank Battalion "M.O. Di Dio" its flag. The Gold Medal of Military Valor, which had been awarded to the 132nd Tank Infantry Regiment for its conduct on 18-19 November 1941 in the action at Bir el Gubi and for its conduct on 3 July 1942 in the First Battle of El Alamein, was duplicated for the battalion's flag and affixed to it. The Gold Medal of Military Valor is also depicted on the battalion's coat of arms.

For its conduct and work after the 1976 Friuli earthquake the 7th Tank Battalion "M.O. Di Dio" was awarded a Bronze Medal of Army Valor, which was affixed to the battalion's flag and added to the battalion's coat of arms.

=== Recent times ===
After the end of the Cold War the Italian Army began to draw down its forces and, on 13 May 1991, the 7th Tank Battalion "M.O. Di Dio" transferred its flag to the Shrine of the Flags in the Vittoriano in Rome for safekeeping. On the 31 of the same month, the battalion was reduced to a reserve unit.

=== Reactivation ===
On 1 October 2022, the standard and traditions of the 7th Tank Battalion "M.O. Di Dio" were assigned to the Command and Tactical Supports Unit "Ariete" of the 132nd Armored Brigade "Ariete", which, on the same date, was renamed 7th Tank Command and Tactical Supports Unit "M.O. Di Dio".

== Organization ==
As of 2025 the 7th Tank Command and Tactical Supports Unit "M.O. Di Dio" is organized as follows:

- 7th Tank Command and Tactical Supports Unit "M.O. Di Dio", in Pordenone
  - Command and Logistic Support Company
  - 132nd Signal Company

== See also ==
- 8th Mechanized Brigade "Garibaldi"
