= Action at Bir el Gubi =

There were two military actions at Bir el Gubi in World War II, both fought in late 1941 during Operation Crusader. These occurred in North Africa, in Libya, in and around a crossroads called Bir el Gubi.

- Action at Bir el Gubi (November 1941), also known as "first battle of Bir el Gubi", a clash between the British 22 Armoured Brigade and the Italian Ariete Division on 19 November 1941
- Action at Bir el Gubi (December 1941), also known as "second battle of Bir el Gubi", a clash between units of the British XXX Corps and Axis units on 4 – 7 December 1941
