= 132nd Tank Regiment (Italy) =

Active Italian Army tank unit

- 132° Reggimento Carri
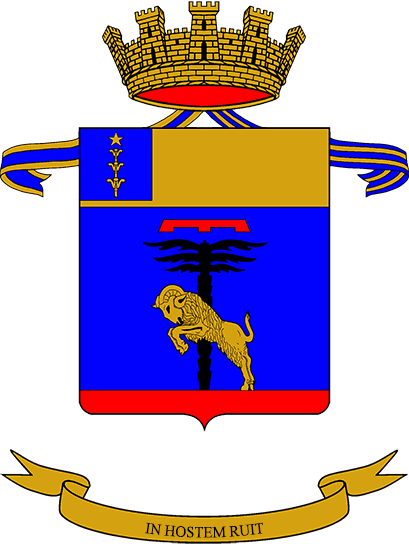
- Regimental coat of arms
- Active: 15 June 1941 — 20 Nov. 1942; 21 March 1944 — 27 Aug. 1944; 1 April 1949 — today
- Country: Italy
- Branch: Italian Army
- Part of: 132nd Armored Brigade "Ariete"
- Garrison/HQ: Cordenons
- Motto: "In hostem ruit"
- Anniversaries: 27 May 1942
- Decorations: 1x Gold Medal of Military Valor; 1x Bronze Medal of Army Valor; 1× Gold Cross of Army Merit

Insignia
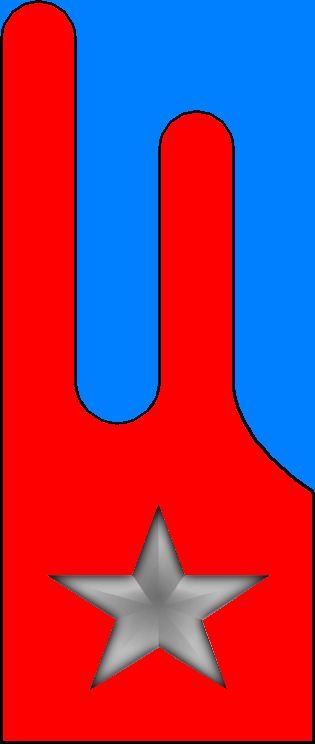
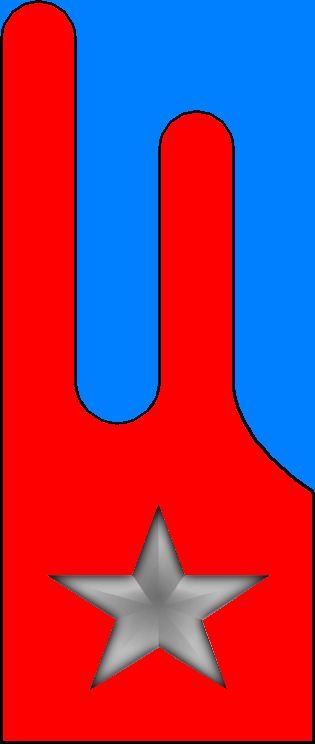
- Tank units gorget patches

The 132nd Tank Regiment (Italian: 132° Reggimento Carri) is a tank regiment of the Italian Army based in Cordenons in Friuli-Venezia Giulia. The regiment is equipped with Ariete C1 main battle tanks and assigned to the 132nd Armored Brigade "Ariete". In June 1941, the Royal Italian Army formed the 132nd Tank Infantry Regiment and assigned it to the 132nd Armored Division "Ariete", which was fighting in the Western Desert campaign in Libya and Egypt. In September 1941, the regiment arrived at the front and in November and December 1941 the regiment fought in Operation Crusader. In 1942, the regiment fought in the Battle of Gazala, Battle of Bir Hakeim, First Battle of El Alamein, Battle of Alam el Halfa, and Second Battle of El Alamein. During the latter battle the regiment was destroyed. For its conduct in North Africa the regiment was awarded Italy's highest military honor the Gold Medal of Military Valor.

In March 1944, the regiment was reformed by the Italian Co-belligerent Army on the island of Sardinia, but already disbanded in August of the same year the regiment was disbanded. In 1949, the Italian Army reformed the regiment and assigned it to the Armored Brigade "Ariete". In 1975, the regiment was disbanded and its flag and traditions were assigned to the 8th Tank Battalion "M.O. Secchiaroli", which had become an autonomous unit on 1 November 1975. In 1992, the battalion lost its autonomy and entered the reformed 132nd Tank Regiment.

Originally the unit, like all Italian tank units, was part of the army's infantry arm, but on 1 June 1999 the tankers specialty was transferred from the infantry arm to the cavalry arm. Consequently, on the same date the regiment replaced its flag with a cavalry standard. The regiment's anniversary falls on 27 May 1942, the day of the Battle of Rugbet el Atasc, during which the 132nd Tank Infantry Regiment overran and destroyed the 3rd Indian Motor Brigade.

== History ==
=== World War II ===
On 15 June 1941, the depot of 4th Tank Infantry Regiment in Rome formed the command and the command company of the 132nd Tank Infantry Regiment. The regiment was immediately sent to Libya, where it joined to the 132nd Armored Division "Ariete", which had been fighting in the Western Desert campaign since arriving in North Africa in January 1941. On 1 September 1941, the regiment received three battalions equipped with M13/40 tanks: the VII Tank Battalion M13/40 and VIII Tank Battalion M13/40 from the 32nd Tank Infantry Regiment, and the IX Tank Battalion M13/40, which had been formed by the depot of the 3rd Tank Infantry Regiment and been assigned to the 32nd Tank Infantry Regiment since 21 July 1941. The regiment then moved forward to meet up with the Ariete at Bir el Gubi, where the division covered the Southern approach to the Axis siege ring around Tobruk.

On 18 November 1941, the British Eighth Army commenced Operation Crusader and on 19 November the British 22nd Armoured Brigade attacked Bir el Gubi. The Ariete division repulsed the attack and then moved towards Sidi Rezegh, where on 29 November the Ariete pushed the 2nd New Zealand Division back in the Battle of Point 175. On 6 December 1941, the division headed back to Bir el Gubi, where a second British attack on Bir el Gubi was repulsed. The same day General Erwin Rommel ordered his forces to retreat to the Gazala line, where in December the Ariete continued the fight against the British advance. During the night of 15-16 December Axis forces abandoned the Gazala line and retreated to El Agheila. The Ariete division had lost 76% of its personnel during Operation Crusader and the 32nd Tank Infantry Regiment was taken out of the front on 31 December 1941 and sent to the rear. On 8 January 1942, the VII Tank Battalion M13/40 was disbanded due to the heavy casualties the battalion had taken during Operation Crusader. The battalion's remaining personnel was assigned to the regiment's two remaining tank battalions.

On 21 April 1942, the regiment received the X Tank Battalion M13/40 from the 133rd Tank Infantry Regiment, which had just arrived in Libya.

==== Battle of Gazala ====
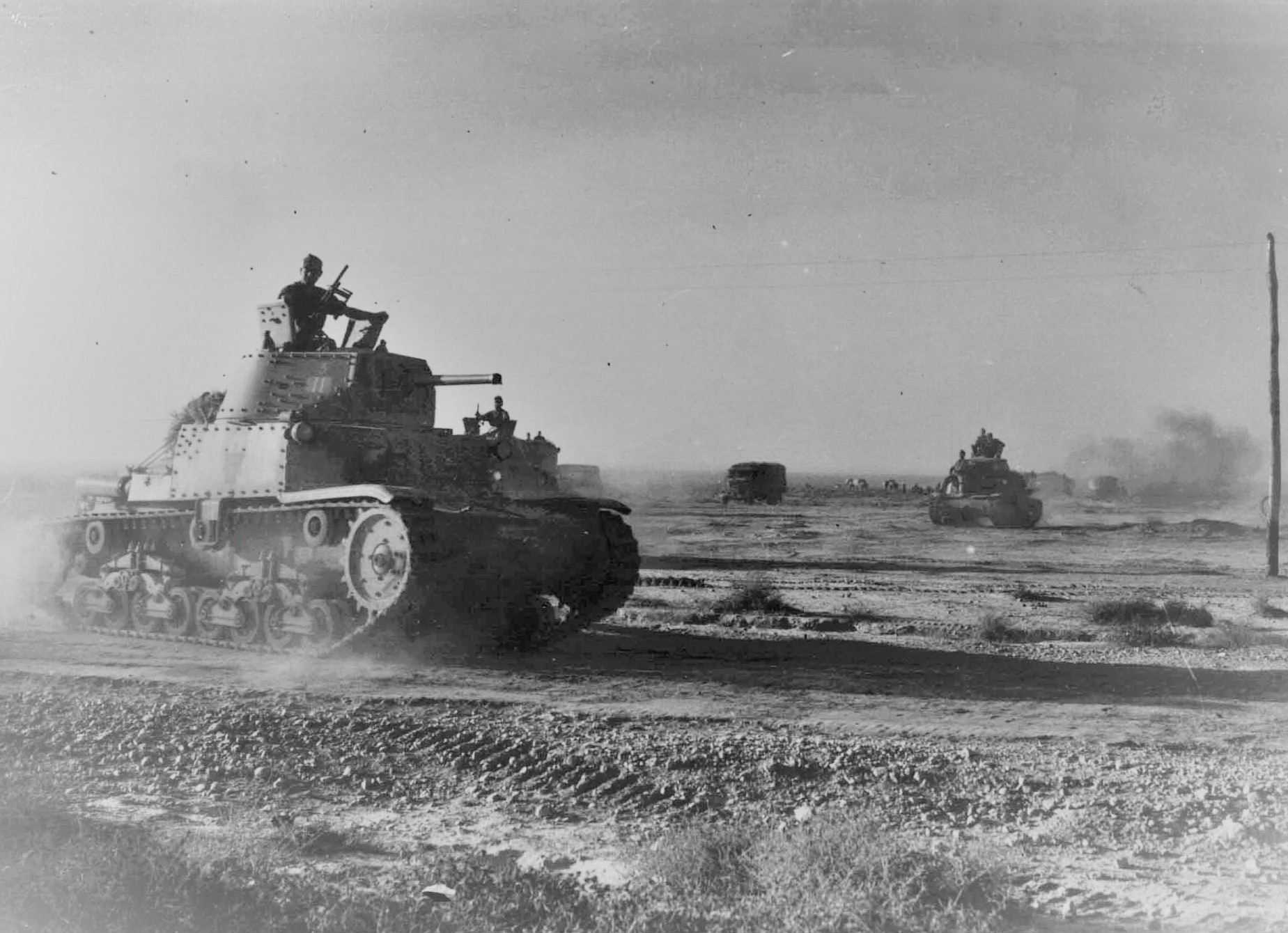
132nd Tank Infantry Regiment M13/40 tanks on the move during the Battle of Gazala

On 26 May 1942, the German-Italian Panzer Army Africa renewed its offensive operations with the Battle of Gazala. The 132nd Tank Infantry Regiment fielded 169 tanks, 87 officers, 245 non-commissioned officers and 1,437 soldiers for the upcoming operation. The Ariete division was tasked to swing around the heavily fortified Bir Hakeim position and attack it from the rear. On 27 May 1942, the 132nd Tank Infantry Regiment encountered the 3rd Indian Motor Brigade at Rugbet el Atasc and sent its veteran VIII and IX tank battalions forward, while the fresh X Tank Battalion was in second line. The Indian position was overrun by the VIII and X battalions with the loss of 23 tanks, some of which were repairable on the field, 30 men killed and 50 wounded, while the Indian brigade lost 440 men killed and wounded and about 1,000 prisoners, including Admiral Sir Walter Cowan, and most of the brigade's equipment.

After over-running the 3rd Indian Motor Brigade, the tank battalions of the 132nd Tank Infantry Regiment moved to the north-east of Bir Hakeim and the IX Tank Battalion with sixty tanks, changed direction towards the fort of Bir Hakeim defended by the 1st Free French Brigade. The IX Tank Battalion arrived before the Bir Hakeim minefield and barbed wire at 8:15 a.m., charged and lost 31 tanks and a Semovente da 75/18 self-propelled gun. Ten tanks got through the minefield and were knocked out by French 75 mm anti-tank guns, causing 124 Italian casualties. The remnants of the IX Tank Battalion retired to the main body of the Ariete, which moved north towards Bir el Harmat around noon, following Rommel's original plan, while the Battle of Bir Hakeim continued for another two weeks. After having defeated the British at Gazala the Axis offensive continued with the capture of Tobruk and the Battle of Mersa Matruh.

==== El Alamein ====
After having pursued the British Eighth Army to El Alamein Rommel attacked again on 1 July 1942 in the First Battle of El Alamein. By 3 July Axis forces were heavily decimated and Rommel paused his attack, which allowed the 132nd Tank Infantry Regiment to pull back to the abandoned British RAF El Daba airfield where the VIII Tank Battalion M13/40 was disbanded to bring the remaining two battalions partially up to strength. By 15 July the 132nd was back at the front attacking the 22nd British Armoured Brigade to the south of Ruweisat Ridge.

In early August 1942, the 132nd Tank Infantry Regiment received the XIII Tank Battalion M13/40, which had been formed on 28 August 1941 by the depot of the 32nd Tank Infantry Regiment in Verona and been assigned to the 31st Tank Infantry Regiment on 21 November 1941. Now again at full strength the 132nd Tank Infantry Regiment was ready for Rommel's next attempt to break through at El Alamein. During the resulting Battle of Alam el Halfa the regiment was heavily engaged at El Qattara.

On 23 October 1942, the Second Battle of El Alamein commenced during which the 132nd Tank Infantry Regiment clashed repeatedly with British armored formations, but on 4 November the entire Ariete division was encircled by the 7th British Armoured Division and annihilated. The 132nd Tank Infantry Regiment was declared lost due to wartime events on 20 November 1942.

The few survivors of the 132nd Tank Infantry Regiment, 133rd Tank Infantry Regiment, and XI Tank Battalion M13/40 of the 101st Motorized Division "Trieste" were grouped together in the "Cantaluppi" Group, an ad hoc formation commanded by Colonel Gaetano Cantaluppi. On 5 December 1942, the group was reorganized as 132nd Anti-tank Regiment. The regiment was assigned to the 131st Armored Division "Centauro", with which it fought in the Tunisian campaign. The regiment was declared lost due to wartime events on 18 April 1943 after the Battle of El Guettar.

For its conduct and service on 18 November 1941 at Bir el Gubi and on 3 July 1942 at El Alamein the 132nd Tank Infantry Regiment was awarded Italy's highest military honor the Gold Medal of Military Valor, which was affixed to the regiment's flag.

==== Sardinia ====
On 20 September 1942, the 32nd Tank Infantry Regiment was reformed and sent to Sardinia to bolster Italian forces on the island against an allied invasion. In the evening of 8 September 1943, the Armistice of Cassibile, which ended hostilities between the Kingdom of Italy and the Anglo-American Allies, was announced by General Dwight D. Eisenhower on Radio Algiers and by Marshal Pietro Badoglio on Italian radio. Germany reacted by invading Italy and disbanding all Italian units on the Italian mainland, while the German 90. Panzergrenadier-Division and other German forces evacuated Sardinia. On 21 March 1944, the Italian Co-belligerent Army reformed the 132nd Tank Infantry Regiment by splitting the 32nd Tank Infantry Regiment. The reformed regiment consisted of the following units:

- 132nd Tank Infantry Regiment, in Sanluri
  - I Tank Battalion L, with L3/35 tankettes
  - II Tank Battalion L, with L3/35 tankettes
  - III Motorcycle Machine Gunners Battalion
  - IV Self-propelled Battalion 47/32, with Semovente da 47/32 self-propelled guns (former XX Self-propelled Battalion 47/32)
  - V Self-propelled Battalion 47/32, with Semovente da 47/32 self-propelled guns (former CXXI Self-propelled Battalion 47/32)

On 15 May 1944, the Infantry Division "Granatieri di Sardegna" was reformed in Sardinia and the 32nd and 132nd tank infantry regiments were assigned to the division, which remained on the island. On 27 August 1944, the 132nd Tank Infantry Regiment was disbanded, followed by the Granatieri di Sardegna division on 31 August, and 32nd Tank Infantry Regiment on 2 October 1944.

=== Cold War ===
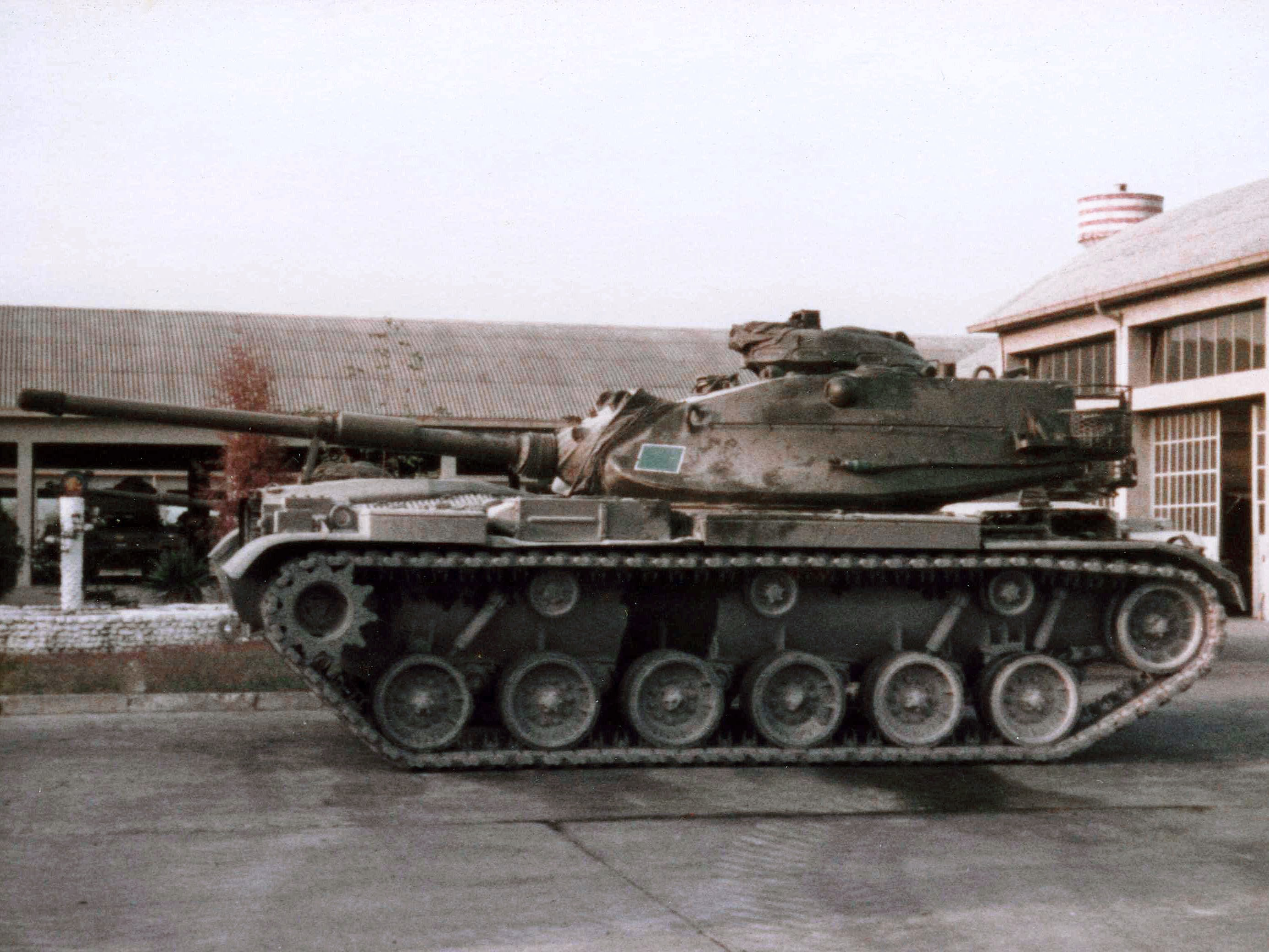
M60A1 Patton main battle tank of the 132nd Tank Regiment in 1983

On 15 March 1948, the Tank School in Rome formed the I Tank Battalion, which was equipped with M4 Sherman tanks. On 10 July 1948, the school reformed the 1st Tankers Regiment and formed the II Tank Battalion. On 7 September of the same year, the regiment was assigned to the Armored Brigade "Ariete", which had been formed on 1 June 1948. On 1 April 1949, the 1st Tankers Regiment was renamed 132nd Tankers Regiment. On 28 April 1950, the regiment moved from Rome to Aviano in Friuli-Venezia Giulia.

On 1 March 1951, the regiment formed the III Tank Battalion, which on 15 September of the same year was transferred to the reformed 31st Tankers Regiment. On 1 March 1952, the regiment formed its III Tank Battalion for a second time. On 1 October 1952, the Armored Brigade "Ariete" was expanded to Armored Division "Ariete". In 1954, the regiment was equipped with a M26 Pershing tanks. On 5 January 1959, the regiment was renamed 132nd Tank Regiment and on 5 February the regiment's I, II, and III tank battalions were redesignated as VII, VIII, and X tank battalions. Afterwards the regiment's organization was as follows:

- 132nd Tank Regiment, in Aviano
  - Command Company
  - VII Tank Battalion, with M26 Pershing tanks
  - VIII Tank Battalion, with M26 Pershing tanks
  - X Tank Battalion, with M26 Pershing tanks

In 1963, the Armored Division "Ariete" adapted its organization to NATO standards and added a brigade level to the division's organization. On 1 January 1963, the III Armored Brigade "Ariete" was formed in Maniago and the 132nd Tank Regiment, as well as support forces, entered the new brigade. On 1 July 1963, the 8th Bersaglieri Regiment transferred its V Battalion to the 132nd Tank Regiment, which in turn transferred on the same date its VII Tank Battalion to the 8th Bersaglieri Regiment. Upon entering the 132nd Tank Regiment the V Battalion was redesignated as XXXVIII Bersaglieri Battalion. Afterwards the brigade consisted of the following units:

- III Armored Brigade "Ariete", in Maniago
  - 132nd Tank Regiment, in Aviano
    - VIII Tank Battalion, with M47 Patton main battle tanks
    - X Tank Battalion, with M47 Patton main battle tanks
    - XXXVIII Bersaglieri Battalion, with M113 armored personnel carriers
    - Anti-tank Company, with M40 recoilless rifles
  - III Self-propelled Group, 132nd Armored Artillery Regiment, with M7 Priest self-propelled howitzers, in Maniago
  - III Service Battalion, in Maniago
  - 3rd Engineer Company
  - 3rd Signal Company

On 1 October 1968, the brigade headquarters were disbanded, however the VII Tank Battalion and XXXVIII Bersaglieri Battalion did not return to their original regiments.

During the 1975 army reform the army disbanded the regimental level and newly independent battalions were granted for the first time their own flags, respectively in the case of cavalry units, their own standard. On 31 October 1975, the 132nd Tank Regiment was disbanded and the next day the regiment's VIII Tank Battalion in Aviano became an autonomous unit and was renamed 8th Tank Battalion "M.O. Secchiaroli". As part of the reform tank and armored battalions were named for officers, soldiers and partisans of the tank speciality, who had served in World War II and been awarded Italy's highest military honor the Gold Medal of Military Valor. The 8th Tank Battalion was named for Corporal Giovanni Secchiaroli, who, while serving as a M13/40 tank machine gunner in the VIII Tank Battalion M13/40, was killed in action on 27 May 1942 during the Battle of Rugbet el Atasc.

On the same date, 1 November 1975, the regiment's X Tank Battalion became an autonomous unit and was renamed 10th Tank Battalion "M.O. Bruno", while the XXXVIII Bersaglieri Battalion became an autonomous unit and was renamed 27th Bersaglieri Battalion "Jamiano". The three battalions were then assigned to the 132nd Armored Brigade "Manin", which was formed on the same day by reorganizing the command of the 132nd Tank Regiment. The two tank battalions consisted now of a command, a command and services company, and three tank companies with M60A1 Patton main battle tanks. Each of the two battalions fielded now 434 men (32 officers, 82 non-commissioned officers, and 320 soldiers). On 12 November 1976, the President of the Italian Republic Giovanni Leone assigned with decree 846 the flag and traditions of the 132nd Tank Regiment to the 8th Tank Battalion "M.O. Secchiaroli" and the flag and traditions of the 133rd Tank Infantry Regiment to the 10th Tank Battalion "M.O. Bruno".

In 1986, the Italian Army abolished the divisional level and brigades, which until then had been under one of the Army's four divisions, came forthwith under direct command of the Army's 3rd Army Corps or 5th Army Corps. As the Armored Division "Ariete" carried a historically significant name, the division ceased to exist on 30 September in Pordenone, and the next day in the same location the 132nd Armored Brigade "Ariete" was activated. The new brigade took command of the units of the 132nd Armored Brigade "Manin", whose name was stricken from the roll of active units of the Italian Army.

=== Recent times ===
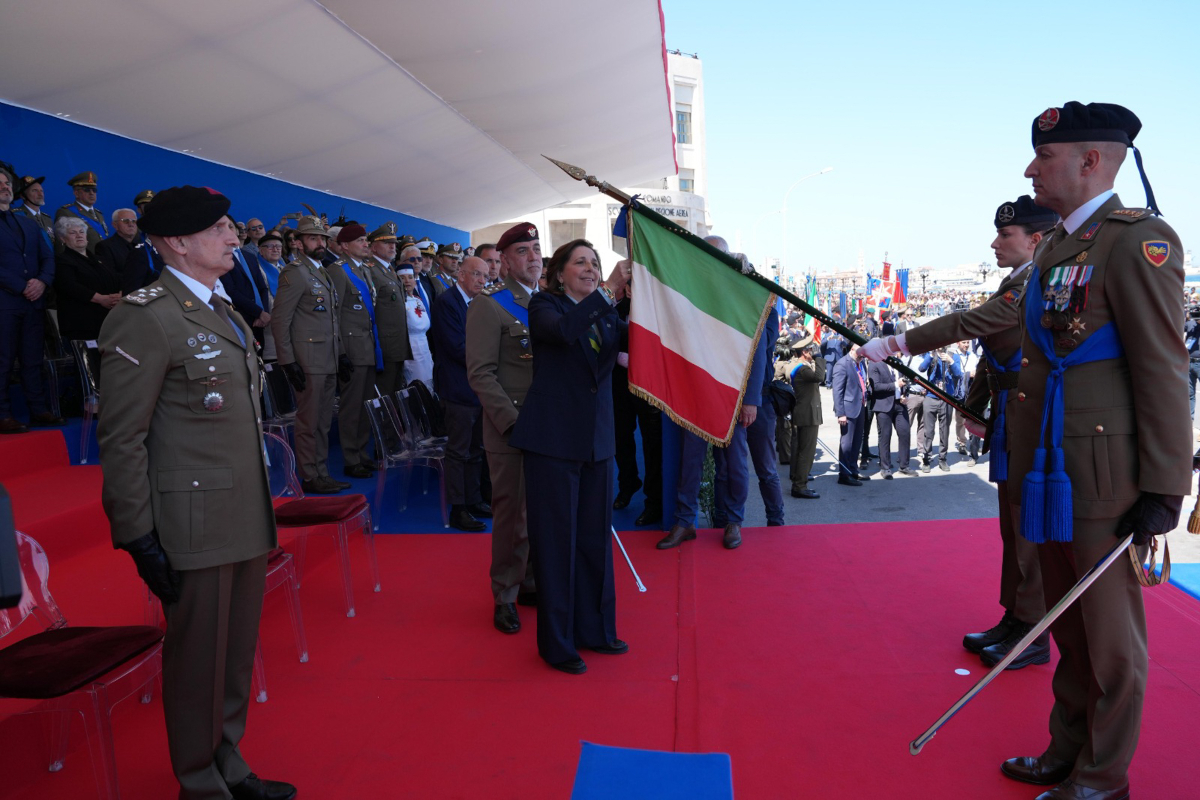
Undersecretary of Defence Isabella Rauti affixes the Gold Cross of Army Merit awarded to 132nd Tank Regiment to the regiment's standard

On 26 July 1992, the 8th Tank Battalion "M.O. Secchiaroli" in Aviano lost its autonomy and the next day, on 27 July 1992, the battalion entered the reformed 132nd Tank Regiment. Between 29 December 1992 and 15 March 1994, the 132nd Tank Regiment served with the United Nations Operation in Somalia II, for which it was awarded a Bronze Medal of Army Valor, which was affixed to the regiment's flag and added to the regiment's coat of arms.

On 1 August 1995, the 63rd Tank Regiment in Cordenons was transferred from the Mechanized Brigade "Mantova" to the 132nd Armored Brigade "Ariete". In November 1995, the 132nd Tank Regiment disbanded its companies in Aviano and on 28 November 1995, the 63rd Tank Regiment transferred its flag to the Shrine of the Flags in the Vittoriano in Rome for safekeeping. The next day, on 29 November 1995, the flag of the 132nd Tank Regiment travelled from Aviano to Cordenons, where on the same date the 63rd Tank Regiment was disbanded. On 30 November 1995, the 132nd Tank Regiment assumed command of the personnel and equipment of the disbanded regiment in Cordenons.

On 1 June 1999, the tankers specialty was transferred from the infantry arm to the cavalry arm. Consequently, on the same date the regiment replaced its flag with a cavalry standard. On 2 May 2025, the regiment, for its many missions abroad, was awarded a Gold Cross of Army Merit, which was affixed to the regiment's standard.

== Organization ==
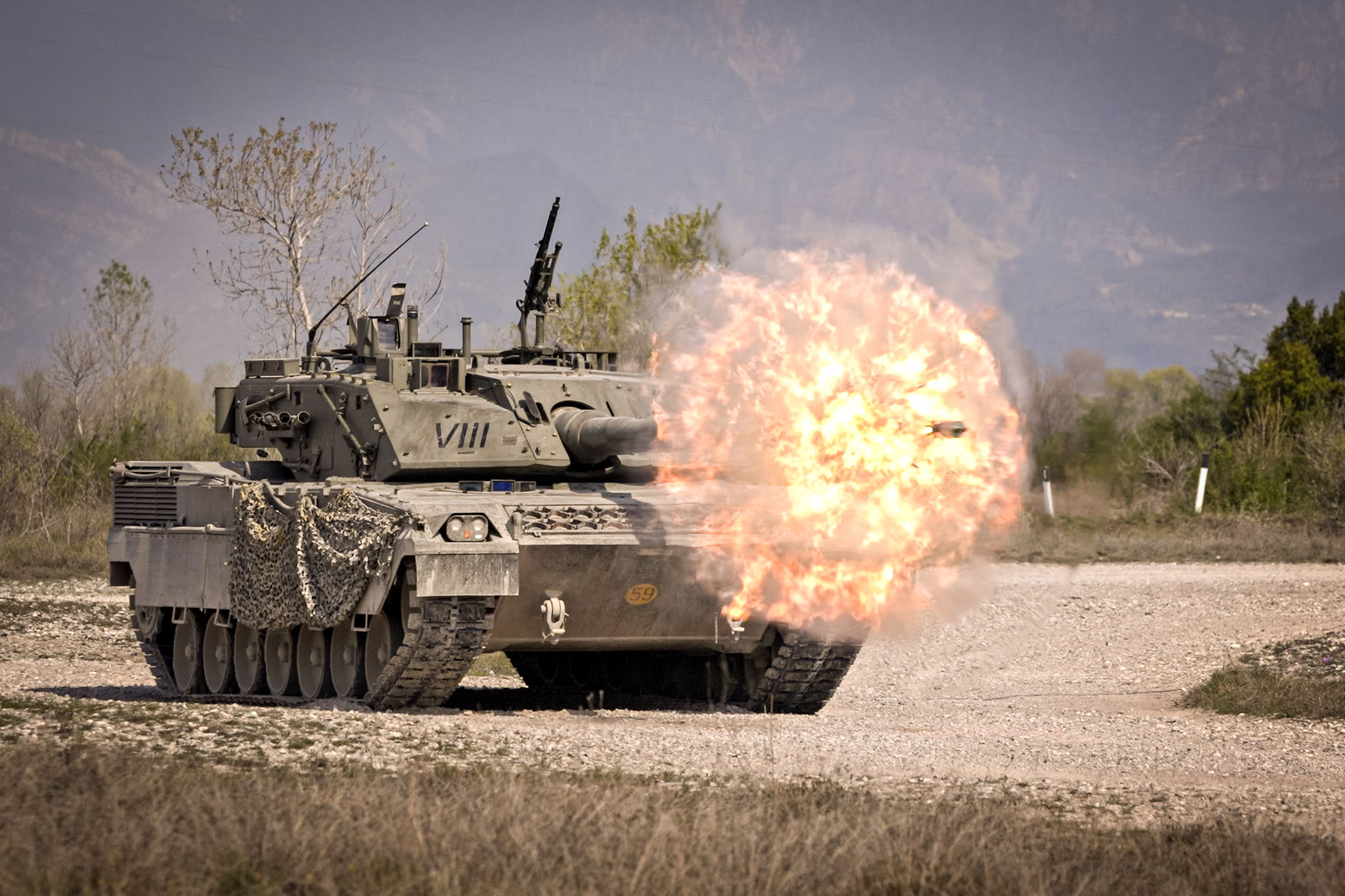
132nd Tank Regiment Ariete tank firing during exercise ARES 2/25 held in April 2025

As of 2025 the 132nd Tank Regiment is organized as follows:

- 132nd Tank Regiment, in Cordenons
  - Command and Logistic Support Company
  - 8th Tank Battalion "M.O. Secchiaroli"
    - 1st Tank Company
    - 2nd Tank Company
    - 3rd Tank Company
    - 4th Tank Company (Suspended due to a lack of tanks)

The regiment is equipped with Ariete C1 main battle tanks, which are being replaced by Ariete C2 main battle tanks.

== See also ==
- 132nd Armored Brigade "Ariete"

== Sources ==
- Ford, Ken (2008). Gazala 1942: Rommel's Greatest Victory. Oxford: Osprey. ISBN 978-1-84603-264-6.
- Greene, J.; Massignani, A. (1994). Rommel's North Africa Campaign: September 1940 – November 1942. Conshohocken, PA: Combined Books. ISBN 0-58519-391-6.
- Montanari, Mario (1993). Le Operazioni in Africa Settentrionale: Tobruk (Marzo 1941 – Gennaio 1942) Parte Seconda [Operations in North Africa: Tobruk (March 1941 – January 1942) Second Part]. Vol. II (2nd [online scan] ed.). Roma: Esercito Italiano Ufficio Storico. OCLC 885609741 – via issuu.
