= Mario Balotta =

Italian general during World War II

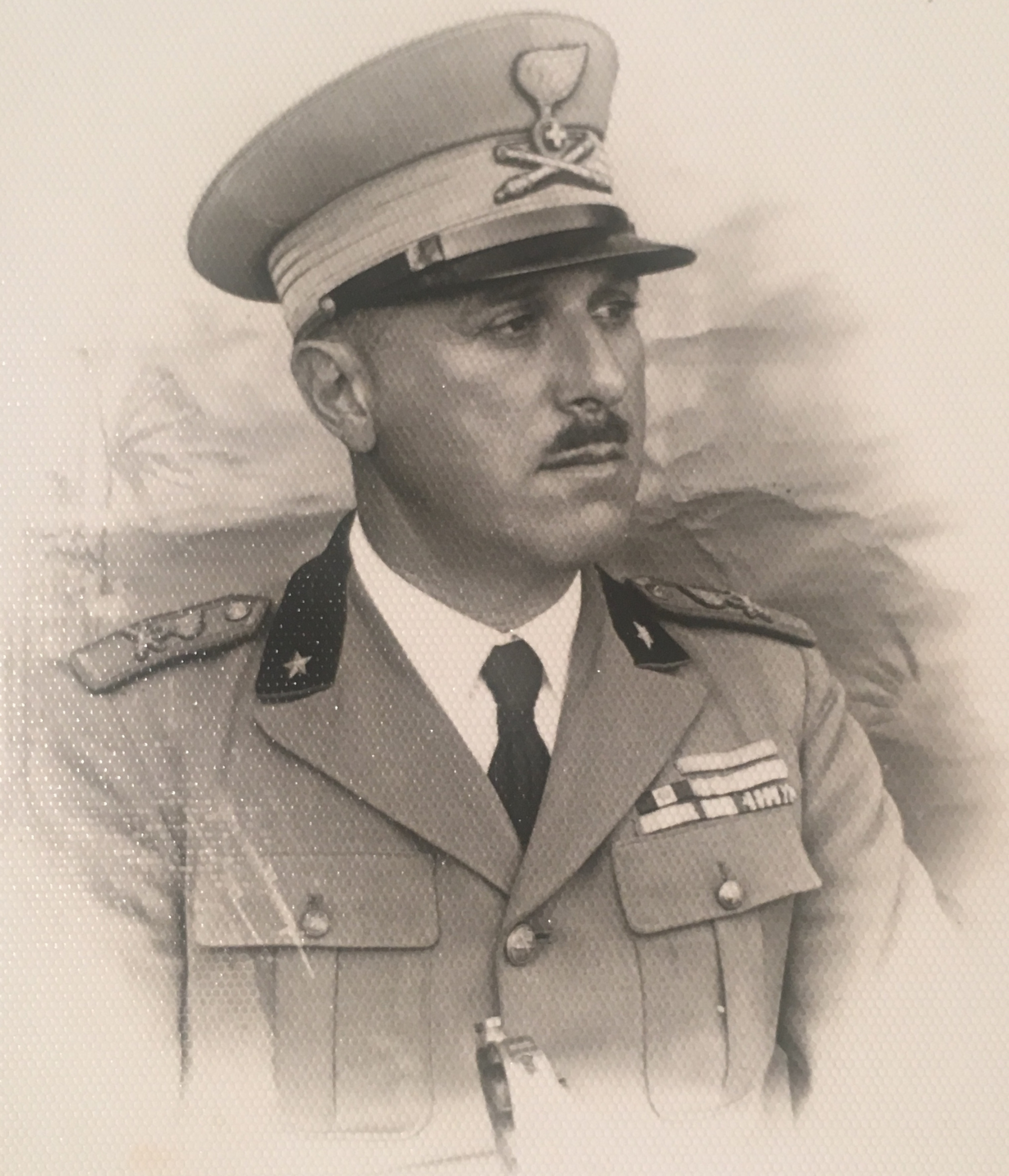
- Born: 26 September 1886; Rome, Kingdom of Italy
- Died: 28 July 1963 (aged 76); Viareggio, Italy
- Military career
- Allegiance: Kingdom of Italy
- Branch: Royal Italian Army
- Service years: 1904–1945
- Rank: Lieutenant General
- Commands: 7th Artillery Regiment; 30th Artillery Regiment "Leonessa"; Central School of Artillery; 52nd Artillery Regiment "Torino"; 132nd Armoured Division Ariete
- Conflicts: World War I; Battles of the Isonzo; World War II; Operation Crusader; First Battle of Bir el Gubi; Second Battle of Bir el Gubi; Battle of Point 175; Operation Little Saturn
- Awards: Bronze Medal of Military Valour; Order of the Crown of Italy; Order of the German Eagle; Iron Cross

Mario Balotta (Rome, 7 September 1886 – Viareggio, 28 July 1963) was an Italian general during World War II.

== Biography ==
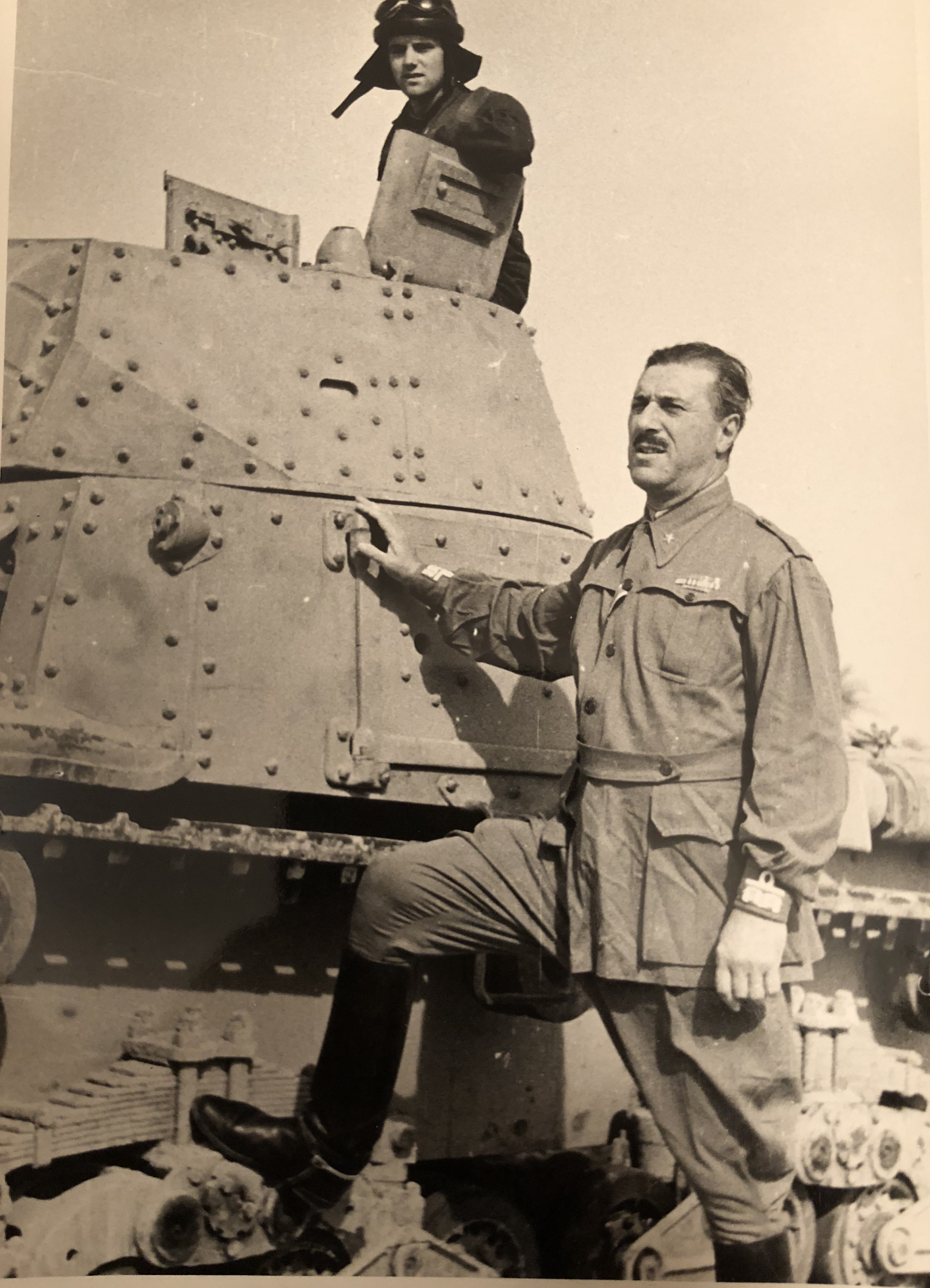
Balotta standing next to a tank of the Ariete Division in North Africa

He was born in Rome, the son of artillery Colonel Emilio Attilio Francesco Giuseppe Balotta and Marquise Lavinia Carcano, and in 1904 he enrolled in the Military Academy of Turin, after which he attended the Army Application School. In 1910 he married Emilia Falorni in 1910, the daughter of an upper-middle-class family from the Val d'Arno, who gave him two children, Alberto (who also became an Army officer) and Liliana.

During the First World War, Balotta fought as an artillery officer on the Karst Plateau, where he was wounded. After the war he commanded the 7th Artillery Regiment and later the 30th Artillery Regiment "Leonessa" in Brescia. From May 1935 to January 1936 he served as acting Chief of Staff of the artillery of the XI Army Corps in Udine; in 1936 he was promoted to colonel and given command of the 30th Artillery Regiment "Leonessa", and from October 1937 to September 1939 he was commander of the Central School of Artillery, writing several articles for the magazine Rivista di Artiglieria. In 1939 he participated in the invasion of Albania.

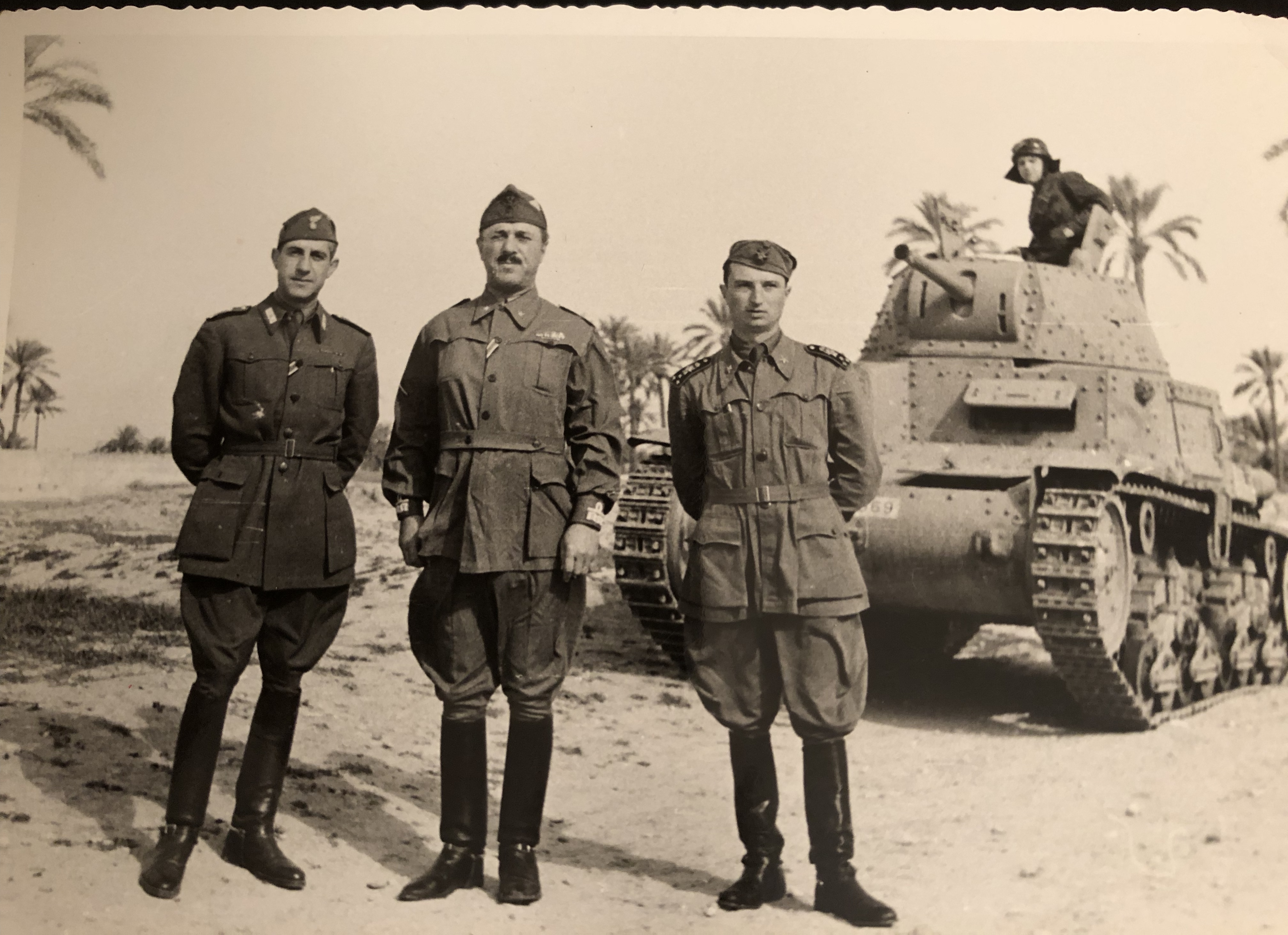
Balotta (center) with two officers of the Ariete Division

From September 1939 to February 1940, Balotta was in command of the 52nd Artillery Regiment "Torino", and in February 1940 he assumed command of the artillery of the XIV Corps. After promotion to brigadier general in May 1940, in July 1941 he was given command of the 132nd Armoured Division Ariete, fighting in North Africa and leading the division to victory in the first and second battle of Bir el Gubi. He left command of the Division in January 1942, and two months later he was promoted to Major General for war merit and given command of the artillery of the Italian Army in Russia, deployed on the Eastern Front.

After the destruction of the ARMIR, he was repatriated, and after the Armistice of Cassibile he was arrested by the Germans and later also imprisoned by the partisans. A convinced monarchist, he retired from the Army in 1946, with the rank of Lieutenant General. He died from a heart attack in Viareggio, where he was on vacation, on 23 July 1963.
