= 8th Bersaglieri Regiment =

Active Italian Army mechanized infantry unit

- 8° Reggimento bersaglieri
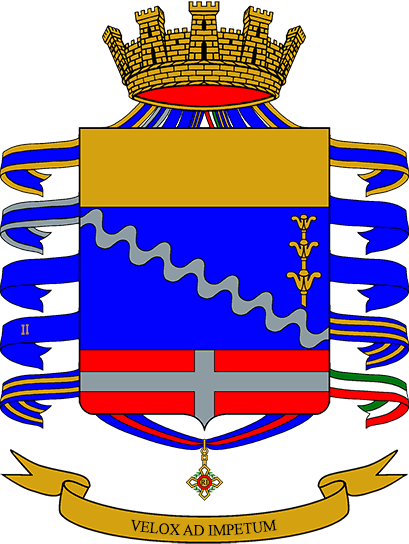
- Regimental coat of arms
- Active: 1 Jan. 1871 — 9 Sept. 1943; 15 Sept. 1949 — today
- Country: Italy
- Branch: Italian Army
- Part of: Bersaglieri Brigade "Garibaldi"
- Garrison/HQ: Caserta
- Motto: "Velox ad impetum"
- March: "Inno all'Ottavo" (8th Anthem)
- Anniversaries: 18 June 1836
- Engagements: Battle of the Chernaya
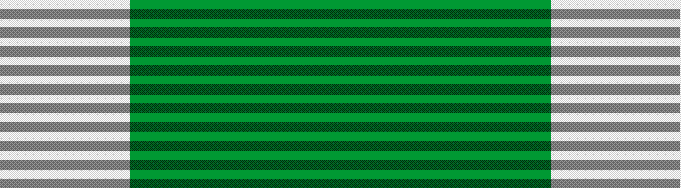
- Decorations: 2x Military Order of Italy; 2x Gold Medals of Military Valor; 1x Silver Medal of Military Valor; 5x Bronze Medals of Military Valor; 1x Gold Medal of Army Valor; 1x Silver Medal of Army Valor; 1x Silver Medal of Civil Valor; 1x Silver Medal of Merit

Insignia
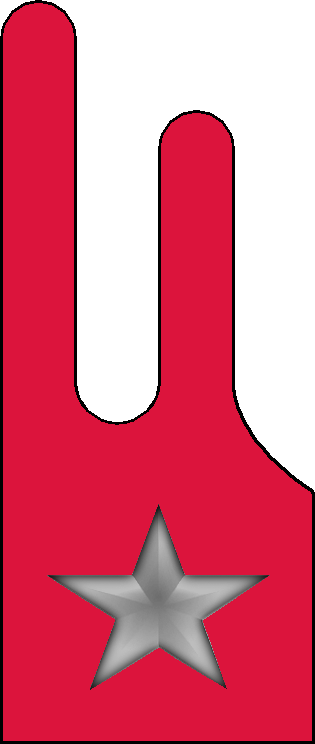
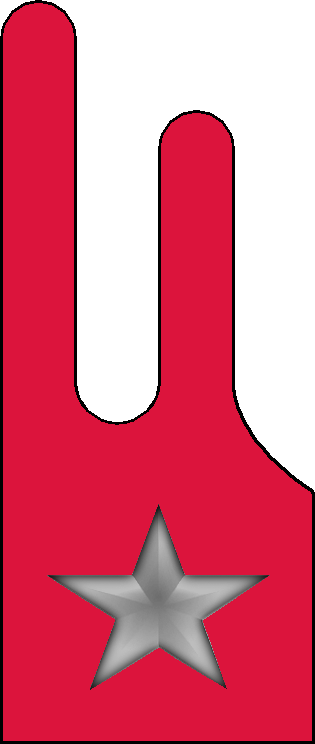
- Bersaglieri gorget patches

The 8th Bersaglieri Regiment (Italian: 8° Reggimento Bersaglieri) is an active unit of the Italian Army based in Caserta in Campania. The regiment is part of the army's infantry corps' Bersaglieri speciality and operationally assigned to the Bersaglieri Brigade "Garibaldi". The regiment was formed in 1871 by the Royal Italian Army with preexisting battalions, which had served in the First Italian War of Independence, Crimean War, Second Italian War of Independence, and Third Italian War of Independence. During the Italo-Turkish War the regiment fought against Ottoman Army forces in Libya. During World War I the regiment served on the Italian front. During World War II the regiment was initially assigned to the 132nd Armored Division "Ariete", with which it fought in the Western Desert Campaign, and then to the 136th Armored Division "Giovani Fascisti", with which if fought in the Tunisian Campaign. For its service and sacrifice in the two North African campaigns the regiment was awarded two Gold Medals of Military Valor.

In 1949 the regiment was reformed in Pordenone and assigned to the Armored Brigade "Ariete". During the 1975 army reform the regimental command was used to form the command of the 8th Mechanized Brigade "Garibaldi", while the regiment's III Battalion became an autonomous unit and was renamed 3rd Bersaglieri Battalion "Cernaia". The battalion received the flag and traditions of the regiment and was assigned to the 8th Mechanized Brigade "Garibaldi". In 1991 the command of the 8th Mechanized Brigade "Garibaldi" and the 3rd Bersaglieri Battalion "Cernaia" moved from Pordenone to Caserta in the South of Italy. In 1993 the battalion lost its autonomy and entered the reformed 8th Bersaglieri Regiment. The regiment's anniversary falls, as for all Bersaglieri units, on 18 June 1836, the day the Bersaglieri speciality was founded.

== History ==
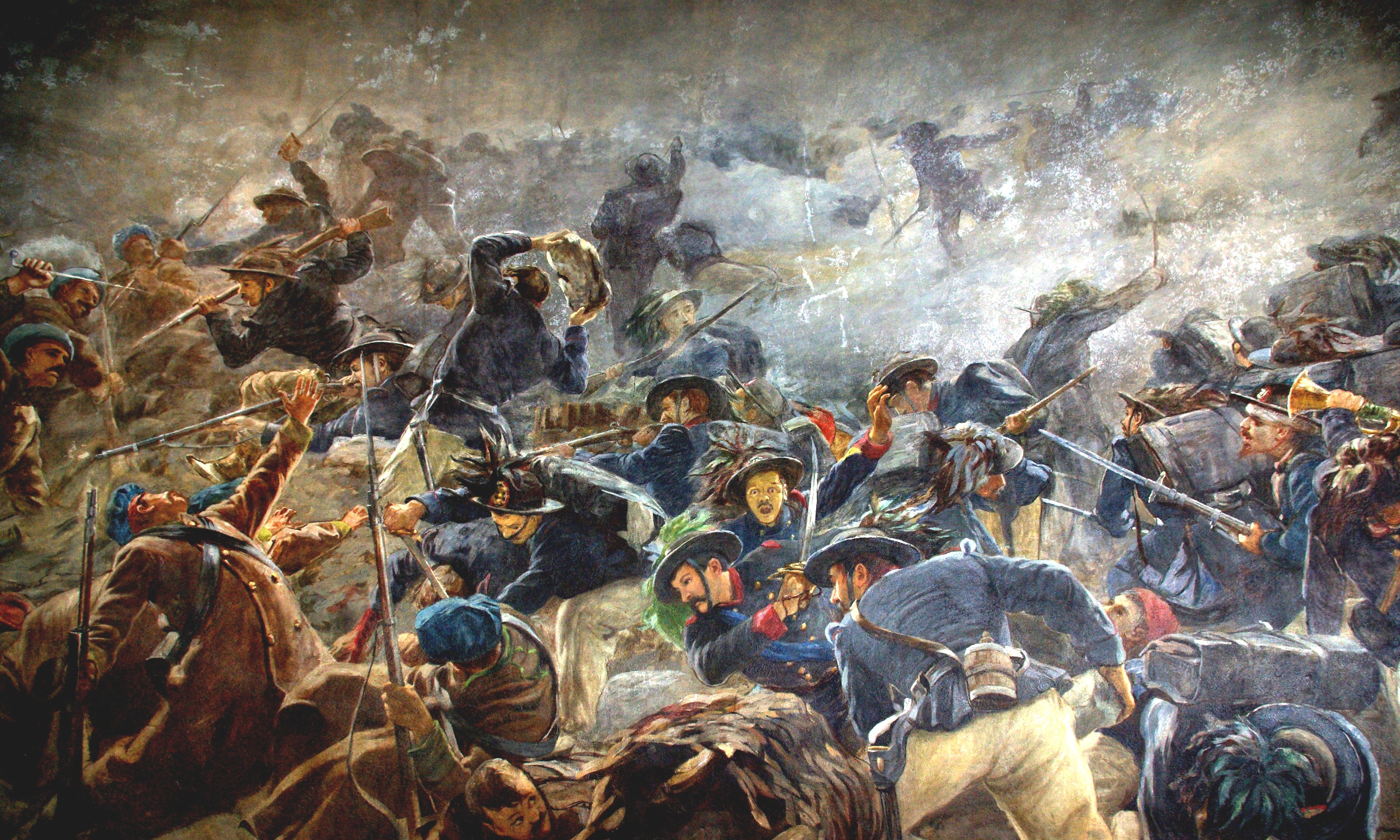
Bersaglieri halt the Russian advance during the Battle of the Chernaya in Crimea in 1855

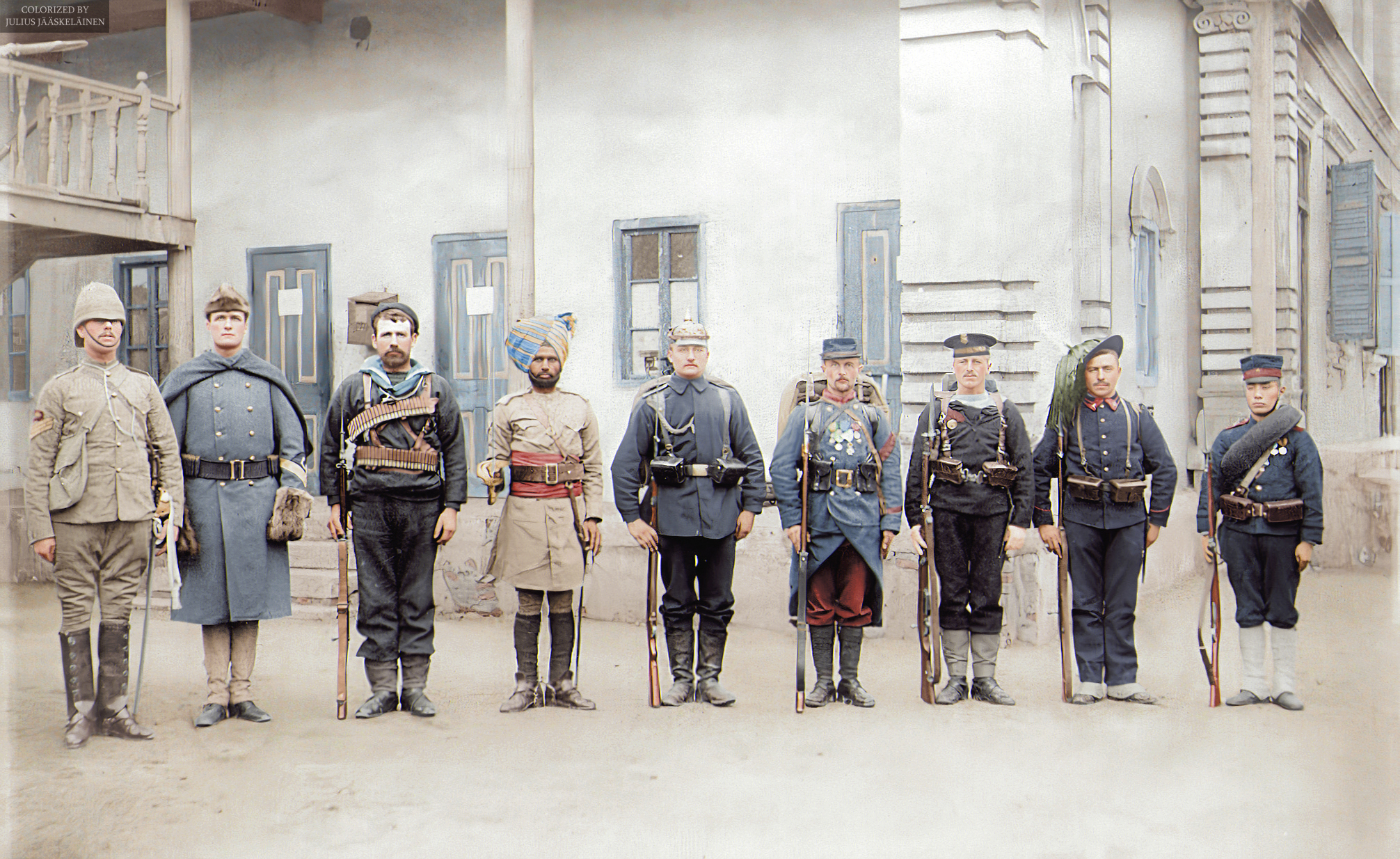
Second from right: Bersagliere in China during the Boxer Rebellion in 1901

On 1 January 1871 the 8th Bersaglieri Regiment was formed in Palermo with the III Battalion, V Battalion, XII Battalion, and XXIII Battalion, which were transferred from the 3rd Bersaglieri Regiment. The four battalions were renumbered as I, II, III, and IV battalion upon entering the new regiment. On 16 September 1883 the IV Battalion was transferred to the newly formed 12th Bersaglieri Regiment. On 18 June 1886, all Bersaglieri battalions resumed their original numbering and afterwards the 8th Bersaglieri Regiment consisted of the III Battalion, V Battalion, and XII Battalion:

The III and V battalions had been formed by the Royal Sardinian Army in early 1849 during the First Italian War of Independence. On 23 March 1849, both battalions fought in the Battle of Novara, during which the III Battalion's 9th Company and the V Battalion distinguished themselves. Both units were awarded a Bronze Medal of Military Valor. When the battalions joined the 8th Bersaglieri Regiment the two medals were affixed to the regiment's flag and added to the regiment's coat of arms.

In 1855 the III Battalion's 9th and 10th companies were assigned to the II Provisional Bersaglieri Battalion, while the V Battalion's 17th and 18th companies were assigned to the III Provisional Bersaglieri Battalion. The two provisional battalions were part of the Sardinian Expeditionary Corps, which fought in the Crimean War. The two battalions fought in the Battle of the Chernaya and the Siege of Sevastopol.

In 1859 the III and V battalions fought in the Second Italian War of Independence, during which the III Battalion's 9th Company distinguished itself in the Battle of Solferino and earned its second Bronze Medal of Military Valor. The same year the XII Battalion was formed. In 1860-61 the three battalions participated in the Sardinian campaign in central and southern Italy and fought in the Battle of Castelfidardo and Siege of Gaeta. In 1866 the battalions participated in the Third Italian War of Independence and fought in the Battle of Custoza. In September 1870 the XII Battalion participated in the capture of Rome.

In 1895-96 the regiment provided twelve officers and 409 troops to help form the I, III, IV, and VI provisional battalions, which were deployed to Eritrea for the First Italo-Ethiopian War. In 1897 the XII Battalion was deployed to Heraklion in Crete as part of the international force, which intervened in the Cretan Revolt. In 1900-01 the regiment's 7th Company, along with companies of the 2nd Bersaglieri Regiment, 4th Bersaglieri Regiment, and 5th Bersaglieri Regiment, was assigned to a provisional Bersaglieri battalion, which served with the Eight-Nation Alliance in China during the Boxer Rebellion. In December 1908 the regiment was deployed to the area of the Strait of Messina for the recovery efforts after the 1908 Messina earthquake. For its service the regiment was awarded a Silver Medal of Merit, which was affixed to the regiment's flag. On 1 October 1910 the regiment's depot in Palermo formed the VIII Cyclists Battalion. In 1911, the regiment deployed to Libya for the Italo-Turkish War. The regiment fought in October 1911 and February 1912 at El-Mergèb, and then in May 1912 at Lebda. For its service and conduct in Libya the regiment was awarded a Bronze Medal of Military Valor, which was affixed to the regiment's flag and added to the regiment's coat of arms.

=== World War I ===
At the outbreak of World War I the regiment consisted of the III, V, and XII battalions and the VIII Cyclists Battalion, which operated as an autonomous unit throughout the war. Already before the outbreak of the war the regiment's III Battalion was deployed to Italian Libya and therefore the regimental depot in Verona formed the XXXVIII Battalion as replacement. On 6 February 1915 the depot also formed the XLVIII Battalion, which also operated as an autonomous unit. On 23 May 1915, the day Italy entered the war, the 8th Bersaglieri Regiment was deployed on Monte Lessini plateau, but already on 26 May it was transferred to the Cadore sector, where it remained until October 1917. On 24 October 1917 Austro-Hungarian forces commenced the Battle of Caporetto, which led to an Italian retreat to the Southern bank of the Piave river. The 8th Bersaglieri Regiment formed the rear guard of the Italian forces, which retreated through the Piave valley from Cadore to the Venetian plain. During the same retreat the XLVIII Battalion was encircled by enemy forces near Longarone and forced to surrender on 10 November 1917.

On 1 June 1918 the regiment formed, together with the 13th Bersaglieri Regiment, the VI Bersaglieri Brigade. In June 1918 the brigade fought in the Second Battle of the Piave River at Candelù and Fagarè. In October 1918 the brigade fought in the decisive Battle of Vittorio Veneto, during which the regiment crossed the Piave river and pursued the fleeing Austro-Hungarian troops. For its service during the war the regiment was awarded a Silver Medal of Military Valor, which was affixed to the regiment's flag and added to the regiment's coat of arms.

The regiment's VIII Cyclists Battalion fought primarily on the Karst plateau, where the battalion distinguished itself in July 1915 during the Second Battle of the Isonzo. After Italian forces had taken the summit of Monte San Michele the battalion held the summit during the night of 20-21 July against repeated Austro-Hungarian counterattacks. For its sacrifice on Monte San Michele the battalion was awarded a Bronze Medal of Military Valor, which was affixed to the regiment's flag and added to the regiment's coat of arms.

On 28 May 1918 the regiment's III Battalion left Italian Libya and returned to Italy, where it was assigned on 29 June 1918 to the 4th Group of the 2nd Assault Division, with which it continued to serve until the end of the war. Assault divisions were formed with a mix of Arditi and Bersaglieri battalions and used as shock troops.

=== Interwar years ===
After World War I the Royal Italian Army reduced its forces: in February 1919 the 2nd Assault Division was disbanded and the III Battalion returned to the regiment. In November 1919 the VIII Cyclists Battalion was disbanded. On 3 July 1920 the XII Battalion was detached to the 5th Bersaglieri Regiment. The same year the regiment moved from Verona to Florence and the XXXVIII Battalion was disbanded. In February 1921 the XII Battalion returned to the regiment, and was reduced to a reserve unit.

In July 1924 the regiment became a cyclists unit and the XII Battalion was disbanded. Afterwards the time the regiment consisted of the III and V battalions, and a depot. In 1926 the regiment left Florence and returned to Verona. On 1 November 1934, the 8th Bersaglieri Regiment, together with the cavalry regiments Regiment "Savoia Cavalleria" and Regiment "Lancieri di Novara", the 3rd Fast Artillery Regiment, and the III Fast Tanks Group "San Giorgio", was assigned to the 3rd Cavalry Division "Principe Amedeo Duca d'Aosta". In 1935-36 18 officers and 106 troops of the regiment were assigned to other units for the Second Italo-Ethiopian War. In 1936 the regiment lost its role as cyclists unit. On 1 June 1937 the XII Battalion was reformed as a reserve unit and on 5 July of the same year the regiment received the 8th Cannons Company, which was equipped with 47/32 mod. 35 anti-tank guns.

On 1 October 1938 the XII Battalion became an active unit. On 11 November 1938 the regiment was transferred to the II Armored Brigade. On 31 December 1938 the XII Battalion was once more disbanded. On 1 February 1939 the II Armored Brigade was reorganized as 132nd Armored Division "Ariete", which also included the 32nd Tank Infantry Regiment and 132nd Artillery Regiment "Ariete". On 7 April 1939 the III Battalion participated in the Invasion of Albania.

=== World War II ===
On 15 April 1940 the XII Battalion was reformed and one month later the regiment received an Auto Unit. In June 1940 the regiment participated in the Invasion of France. At the time the regiment consisted of the following units:

- 8th Bersaglieri Regiment
  - Command Company
  - III Motorcyclists Battalion
  - V Auto-transported Battalion
  - XII Auto-transported Battalion
  - 8th Cannons Company, with 47/32 mod. 35 anti-tank guns
  - Transport Unit

In December 1940 the British Western Desert Force commenced the Operation Compass to expel the Italian 10th Army from Egypt. The British offensive resulted in the destruction of the Italian 10th Army and the conquest of Cyrenaica. In January 1941 the Ariete was ordered to North Africa, where it participated in the Western Desert campaign. In April 1941 the division fought in Operation Sonnenblume, which drove the British forces back. On 15 April the 8th Bersaglieri Regiment reached Bardia and then participated in the Siege of Tobruk. On 15 May 1941 the British launched Operation Brevity to relieve the siege of Tobruk. During Operation Brevity a company of the 8th Bersaglieri Regiment and the regiment's cannons company defended Fort Capuzzo against the 1st Battalion, Durham Light Infantry. In September 1941 the regiment was reorganized and consisted of the following units:

- 8th Bersaglieri Regiment
  - Command Company
  - III Support Weapons Battalion
    - Command Company
    - Machine Gunners Company
    - Anti-aircraft Company, with 20/65 mod. 35 anti-aircraft guns
    - Mortar Company, with 81mm mod. 35 mortars
  - V Auto-transported Battalion
    - Command Company
    - 2× Bersaglieri companies
    - Cannons Company, with 47/32 mod. 35 anti-tank guns
  - XII Auto-transported Battalion
    - Command Company
    - 2× Bersaglieri companies
    - Cannons Company, with 47/32 mod. 35 anti-tank guns
  - Motorcyclists Company

On 18 November 1941, the British launched Operation Crusader to relieve Tobruk. On 19 November 1941, the Ariete clashed at Bir el Gubi with the British 22nd Armoured Brigade. On 29 November the Ariete engaged the New Zealand 2nd Division at the Battle of Point 175. On 6 December Axis forces were ordered to retreat westwards to the Gazala position.

On 26 May 1942 Axis forces went on the offensive in the Battle of Gazala. By 17–21 June Axis forces had reached Tobruk and captured the city. The Axis advance only came to a halt at El Alamein in Egypt, where in July the First Battle of El Alamein was fought. On 30 August 1942, the Ariete participated in the Battle of Alam el Halfa, but the Axis plan to outflank and encircle the British forces at El Alamein failed. On 23 October 1942 the British Eighth Army commenced the Second Battle of El Alamein. Initially the 8th Bersaglieri Regiment was at the Southern end of the Axis line near the Qattara Depression. On 2 November the Ariete division was ordered to move North to help stem the British advance, but on 4 November the division was surrounded and destroyed by British forces. On 8 December 1942, the 132nd Armored Division "Ariete" was declared lost due to wartime events.

The 8th Bersaglieri Regiment was quickly reformed with battalions drawn from other Bersaglieri regiments: the X Battalion of the 7th Bersaglieri Regiment, which had escaped from El Alamein, the XI Battalion, which had been formed with reinforcements sent from Italy and was originally intended for the 7th Bersaglieri Regiment, and the LVII Battalion of the 10th Bersaglieri Regiment. The regiment was then assigned to the 136th Armored Division "Giovani Fascisti", with which if fought in the Tunisian Campaign: in March 1943 in the Battle of the Mareth Line and then in the Axis retreat towards Tunis. On 26 April 1943 the remaining personnel of the 7th Bersaglieri Regiment, which had been reformed in January 1943 with the III and V battalions, which were originally intended for the 8th Bersaglieri Regiment, was merged into the 8th Bersaglieri Regiment. On 13 May 1943 Axis forces in Tunisia surrendered and the 8th Bersaglieri Regiment was declared lost due to wartime events.

For its service and sacrifice in the Western Desert Campaign and then in the Tunisian Campaign the 8th Bersaglieri Regiment was awarded two Gold Medals of Military Valor, which were affixed to the regiment's flag and added to the regiment's coat of arms. The regiment was reformed as 8th Bersaglieri Cyclists Regiment on 15 July 1943 in Verona by renaming the 10th Bersaglieri Marching Regiment, which had trained the replacement troops for the regiment while it fought in North Africa. After the announcement of the Armistice of Cassibile on 8 September 1943 invading German forces ordered the regiment to surrender. Most of the regiment obeyed the German demands, but the V Battalion and the regiment's Motorcyclists Company in Rovereto refused and clashed with the German forces, which left one officers and 15 Bersaglieri dead.

=== Cold War ===
On 15 September 1949, the 8th Bersaglieri Regiment was reformed in Pordenone, with two battalions transferred from the 3rd Bersaglieri Regiment, respectively the 182nd Infantry Regiment "Garibaldi". Upon entering the reformed regiment the two battalions were renumbered as III and V battalions. The regiment was assigned to the Armored Brigade "Ariete" and equipped with M3 Half-tracks. On 1 October 1952, the Armored Brigade "Ariete was expanded to full division and consequently the regiment reformed the XII Battalion, which became active in June 1953.

In 1963, the Armored Division "Ariete" adapted its organization to NATO standards and added a brigade level to the division's structure. On 1 January 1963 the I Mechanized Brigade "Ariete" was formed in Pordenone and the 8th Bersaglieri Regiment, as well as support forces, entered the new brigade. On 1 July 1963 the V Battalion was transferred from the 8th Bersaglieri Regiment to the 132nd Tank Regiment, which in turn transferred on 1 August of the same year its VII Tank Battalion to the 8th Bersaglieri Regiment. Afterwards the tank battalion moved to Vivaro and the brigade consisted then of the following units:

- I Mechanized Brigade "Ariete", in Pordenone
  - 8th Bersaglieri Regiment, in Pordenone
    - III Bersaglieri Battalion, with M113 armored personnel carriers
    - XII Bersaglieri Battalion, with M113 armored personnel carriers
    - VII Tank Battalion, with M47 Patton main battle tanks, in Vivaro
    - Anti-tank Company, with M40 recoilless rifles
  - I Self-propelled Group, 132nd Armored Artillery Regiment, with M7 Priest self-propelled howitzers, in Vacile
  - I Service Battalion, in Pordenone
  - 1st Engineer Company
  - 1st Signal Company

In 1963 the regiment was sent to Longarone to help rescue efforts after the Vajont dam disaster. For its conduct in Longarone the regiment was awarded a Silver Medal of Civil Valor, which was affixed to the regiment's flag and added to the regiment's coat of arms. On 1 October 1968, the brigade headquarters were disbanded, however the VII Tank Battalion and V Bersaglieri Battalion did not return to their original regiments.

During the 1975 army reform the army disbanded the regimental level and newly independent battalions were granted for the first time their own flags. On 31 October 1975 the 8th Bersaglieri Regiment was disbanded and the next day the regiment's III Bersaglieri Battalion in Pordenone became an autonomous unit and was renamed 3rd Bersaglieri Battalion "Cernaia". The battalion was named for the Battle of the Chernaya, where the Bersaglieri of the 8th Bersaglieri Regiment had fought during Crimean War. On the same day the regiment's XII Bersaglieri Battalion was renamed 26th Bersaglieri Battalion "Castelfidardo", while the VII Tank Battalion was renamed 7th Tank Battalion "M.O. Di Dio". The three battalions were assigned to the 8th Mechanized Brigade "Garibaldi", which was formed on the same day by reorganizing the command of the 8th Bersaglieri Regiment. Each of the two Bersaglieri battalions consisted now of a command, a command and services company, three mechanized companies with M113 armored personnel carriers, and a heavy mortar company with M106 mortar carriers with 120mm Mod. 63 mortars. Each of the two Bersaglieri battalions fielded now 896 men (45 officers, 100 non-commissioned officers, and 751 soldiers).

On 12 November 1976 the President of the Italian Republic Giovanni Leone assigned with decree 846 the flag and traditions of the 8th Bersaglieri Regiment to the 3rd Bersaglieri Battalion "Cernaia", and the flag and traditions of the 4th Bersaglieri Regiment to the 26th Bersaglieri Battalion "Castelfidardo". For its conduct and work after the 1976 Friuli earthquake the battalion was awarded a Silver Medal of Army Valor, which was affixed to the battalion's war flag and added to the battalion's coat of arms. Between 23 October 1983 and 24 January 1984 the battalion deployed to Lebanon as part of the Multinational Force in Lebanon. While guarding the Shatila refugee camp the battalion was involved 24-26 December 1983 in heavy firefights between the Lebanese Army forces and Amal milita.

=== Recent times ===
After the end of the Cold War Italian Army began to reorganize and draw down its forces: as part of the reorganization the 8th Mechanized Brigade "Garibaldi" and 3rd Bersaglieri Battalion "Cernaia" moved from Pordenone in Italy's Northeast to Caserta in Italy's South. On 30 June 1991 the flags of the two units left Pordenone and the next day arrived in Caserta. The same day the 8th Mechanized Brigade "Garibaldi" was renamed 8th Bersaglieri Brigade "Garibaldi". On 25 June 1993 the 3rd Bersaglieri Battalion "Cernaia" lost its autonomy and the next day the battalion entered the reformed 8th Bersaglieri Regiment. As a consequence of the reformation of the 8th Bersaglieri Regiment the 8th Bersaglieri Brigade "Garibaldi" is renamed Bersaglieri Brigade "Garibaldi" on 1 September 1994.

Between 8 December 1995 and 22 May 1996 the regiment was deployed to Sarajevo in Bosnia and Herzegovina as part of NATO's Implementation Force (IFOR), which was tasked to oversee the implementation of the Dayton Peace Accords that ended the Bosnian War. For its service in Sarajevo the regiment was awarded a Gold Medal of Army Valor, which was affixed to the regiment's flag and added to the regiment's coat of arms.

Starting in 1998 the regiment was equipped with Dardo infantry fighting vehicles. In the following years the regiment deployed to Iraq as part of the Multi-National Force – Iraq, to Afghanistan as part of NATO's International Security Assistance Force, to Lebanon as part of the UN's United Nations Interim Force in Lebanon, and to Lettland as part of NATO's Enhanced Forward Presence. For its many deployments the regiment was awarded a Military Order of Italy, which was affixed to the regiment's flag.

== Organization ==
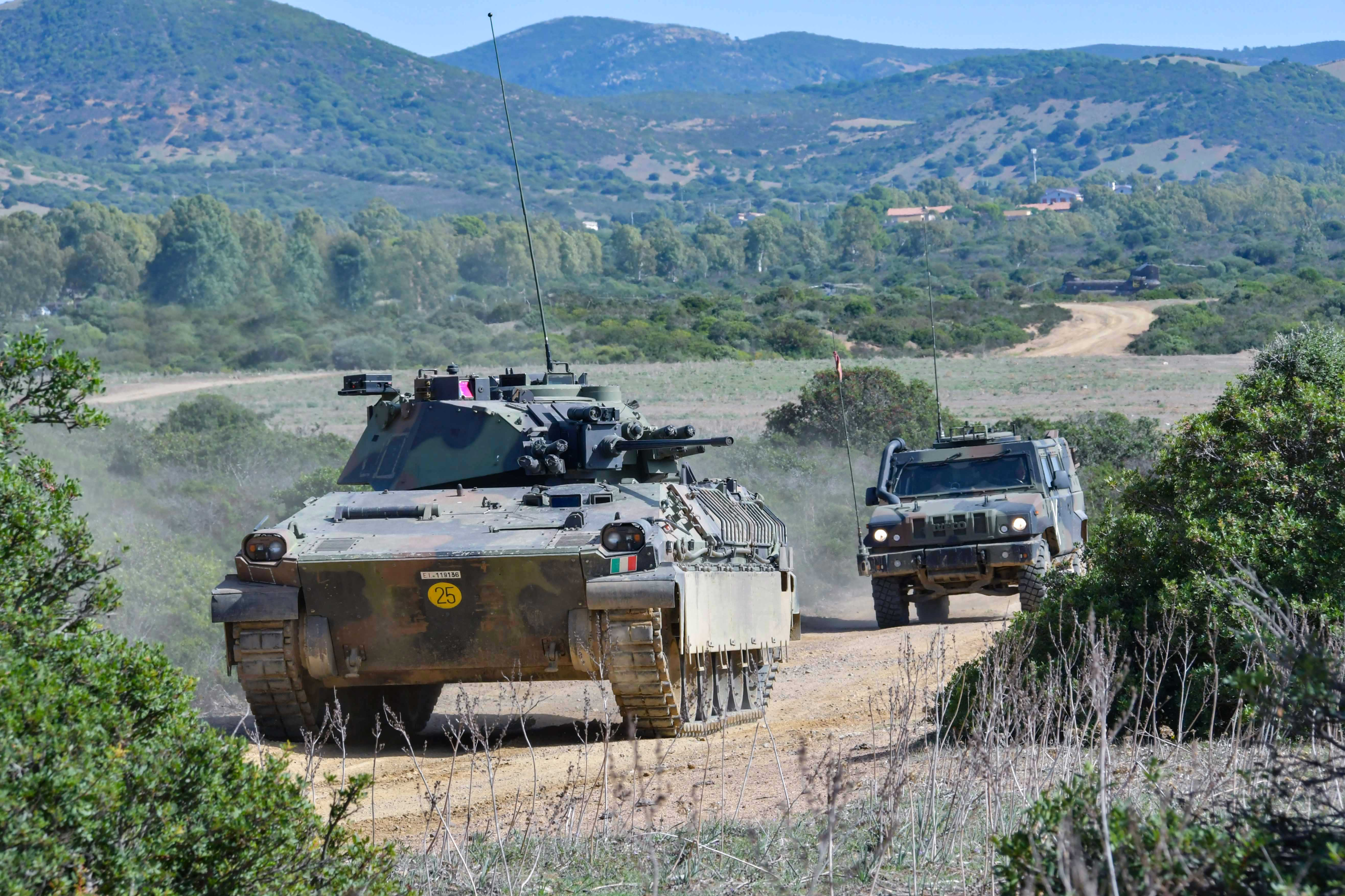
8th Bersaglieri Regiment Dardo IFV and Lince during an exercise at Capo Teulada

As of 2024 the 8th Bersaglieri Regiment is organized as follows:

- 8th Bersaglieri Regiment, in Caserta
  - Command and Logistic Support Company
  - 3rd Bersaglieri Battalion "Cernaia"
    - 1st Bersaglieri Company
    - 2nd Bersaglieri Company
    - 3rd Bersaglieri Company
    - Maneuver Support Company

The regiment is equipped with tracked Dardo infantry fighting vehicles. The Maneuver Support Company is equipped with M106 120mm mortar carriers and Dardo IFVs with Spike LR anti-tank guided missiles.

== See also ==
- Bersaglieri
