= Action at Bir el Gubi (December 1941) =

Libyan battle of World War II

- Part of Operation Crusader during the Second World War
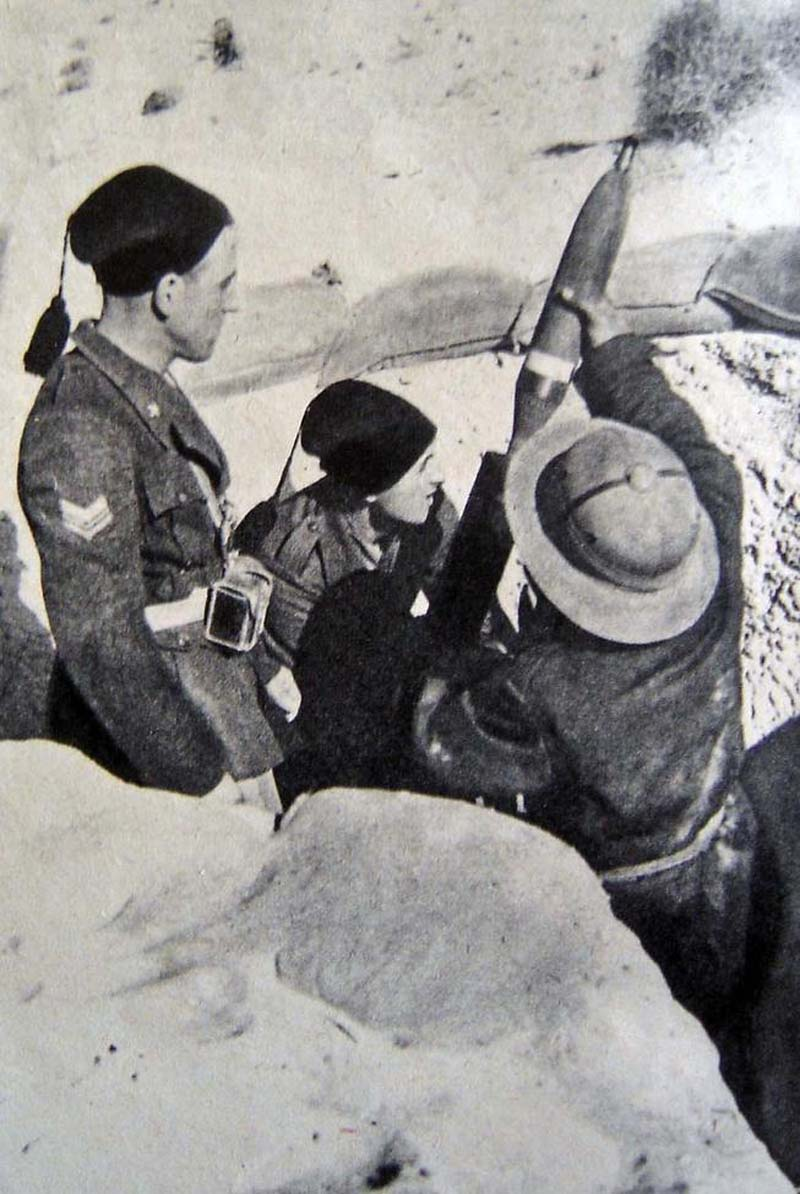
- Members of the Battalion Group "Giovani Fascisti" operating a Mod. 35 (81 mm) mortar in North Africa.
Date	4–6 December 1941
Location	Bir el Gubi, Italian Libya 31.5374°N 24.0307°E
Result	Axis victory

Belligerents
United Kingdom	Italy; Germany

Commanders and leaders
Willoughby Norrie; Andrew Anderson	Ferdinando Tanucci (WIA); Ludwig Crüwell; Walter Neumann (DOW)

Strength
11th Indian Infantry Brigade; 16 Valentine tanks; 1 battery of field guns; 1 battery of anti-tank guns; 2 troops of Bofors AA guns; 7th Medium Regiment, RA	Battalion Group "Giovani Fascisti"; 1,454 men; 10 guns; 2 tanks and 12 tankettes; 49 Panzers later

Casualties and losses
300 killed; 250 wounded; 71 prisoners; 10 tanks	60 killed; 117 wounded; 31 missing and prisoners 10 tankettes

The Action at Bir el Gubi (December 1941) was fought in the Second World War in Libya, between 4 and 6 December 1941, by the Battalion Group "Giovani Fascisti", reinforced on 5 December by German tanks and the 11th Indian Infantry Brigade, part of the Eighth Army. Fighting took place around Point 174 and Point 182, that were held by the "Giovani Fascisti". The 11th Indian Infantry Brigade quickly overran Point 182 but the defenders of Point 174 defeated several attacks, inflicting many casualties. The action was a success for the defending Axis force but a minor part of Operation Crusader, a British victory.

== Background ==
On 18 November 1941, the British Eighth Army began Operation Crusader, which was intended to relieve Tobruk, defeat the Axis armoured divisions and push the German and Italian forces out of Cyrenaica. The British tanks and motorised infantry made a sweeping flanking movement, did not go as expected for the British. The 22nd Armoured Brigade was repulsed by the 132nd Armored Division "Ariete" at Bir el Gubi on 19 November.

Despite inflicting heavy blows on the British during Operation Crusader, by 1 December the Axis forces were becoming exhausted and depleted by the battle of attrition in which the British were bringing up fresh troops. According to Ken Ford, [the] "Eighth Army was maintaining its strength whilst Rommel's command was being whittled away. The German commander now saw his chances of victory fading fast".

The "Ariete" Division was part of XX Corps (CAM Corpo d'Armata di Manovra) which was the most mechanised and best equipped of the two Italian Corps fighting around Tobruk. CAM had a reconnaissance force attached to it, called RECAM. This included on its strength, the Battalion Group "Giovani Fascisti"; two infantry battalions of volunteer Fascist students, who according to Ian Walker, were fanatical, well-trained and properly equipped. The Battalion Group was deployed at two positions north-west of Bir el Gubi, Point 174 and Point 182. CAM headquarters informed them on 3 December there was intelligence they would be attacked the following day.

== Action ==
In early December 1941, the Allies planned a fresh attempt to breakthrough to Tobruk and the commander of XXX Corps positioned the 11th Indian Brigade, 22nd Guards Brigade and 4th Armoured Brigade near Bir el Gubi. The 11th Indian Infantry Brigade, supported by 16 Valentine tanks and artillery, was to attack Points 174 and 182, where they were expecting light resistance. After a night march, their attack began on the morning of 4 December, with the 2nd Battalion of the 5th Mahratta Light Infantry, supported by 13 tanks, taking Point 182 "with ease" (according to Murphy) and 250 Giovani Fascist surrendered. At Point 174, the defenders inflicted a costly defeat; initially from the 2nd Battalion of the Cameron Highlanders supported by 3 tanks and later by the Mahrattas.

The 4th Armoured Brigade was ordered by Army headquarters to move 20 mi (32 km) to the east, after reports of Axis troop movements elsewhere. This would leave the 11th Indian Infantry Brigade vulnerable should Axis tanks arrive in force. On 5 December, 49 tanks from the 15th Panzer Division and the 21st Panzer Division broke through the Mahrattas and linked up with the Italian defenders. In the afternoon of 6 December, the commander of the 15th Panzer Division, Major-General Neumann-Silkow, was mortally wounded, then the evening saw what Murphy described as an "inconclusive mêlée".

== Aftermath ==
On 7 December, British tanks arrived and the remnants of the 11th Indian Brigade were withdrawn, with 22nd Guards Brigade taking over their positions. The Indian brigade went into reserve and was then withdrawn for rebuilding. Ian Walker wrote that Battalion Group "Giovani Fascisti" that "The stubbornness of their two-day defence against superior forces came as a complete surprise to the British, and would become one of the epics of the campaign". While the action near Bir el Gubi was an Axis victory, it did not change the course of Operation Crusader, as on 6 December Rommel ordered a fighting retreat. The Tobruk garrison was relieved and by the end of the month Cyrenaica was captured for a second time by the British.

== See also ==
- List of British military equipment of World War II
- List of Italian military equipment in World War II
- List of German military equipment of World War II

== Bibliography ==
- Ford, Ken (2010). Operation Crusader 1941: Rommel in retreat. Oxford: Osprey. ISBN 978-1-84-603500-5.
- Murphy, W. E. (1961). Fairbrother, Monty C. (ed.). The Relief of Tobruk. The Official History of New Zealand in the Second World War 1939–1945 (online scan ed.). Wellington, NZ: War History Branch, Department of Internal Affairs. OCLC 8000753 – via New Zealand Electronic Text Collection.
- Roggiero, Roberto (2007). "El Alamein La svolta decisiva". Documente illistrati della storia No. 16. Parma: Delta Editrice. ISSN 1722-876X.
- Walker, Ian W. (2003). Iron Hulls, Iron Hearts: Mussolini's Elite Armoured Divisions in North Africa. Ramsbury: The Crowood Press. ISBN 1-86126-646-4.
