= Battle of Point 175 =

Military engagement of Operation Crusader during the Second World War

- Part of Operation Crusader during the Second World War
- Tobruk–Sollum area 1941
Date	29 November – 1 December 1941
Location	near Sidi Rezegh, Libya 31°49′36″N 24°08′10″E
Result	Italian victory

Belligerents
Italy	New Zealand

Commanders and leaders
Mario Balotta	Bernard Freyberg

Strength
132nd Armoured Division Ariete: 9,274 men	2nd New Zealand Division: 20,000 men

Casualties and losses
Operation Crusader: 5,707	Operation Crusader: 4,620

The Battle of Point 175 was a military engagement of the Western Desert Campaign that took place during Operation Crusader from 29 November to 1 December 1941, during the Second World War. Point 175 is a small rise just south of the Trigh Capuzzo, a desert track east of Sidi Rezegh and south of Zaafran. The point was held by Division z.b.V. Afrika (later the 90th Light Afrika Division). The 2nd New Zealand Division and Infantry tanks of the 1st Army Tank Brigade captured Point 175 on 23 November, early in Operation Crusader.

The New Zealanders then attacked westwards and made contact with the Tobruk garrison, which had broken out to meet them. From 29 November to 1 December, the New Zealanders defended the point and the area to the west against Axis attempts to sever the link with the Tobruk garrison and regain control of the local roads. The new 132nd Armoured Division Ariete re-captured Point 175 late on 29 November.

The defenders mistook Italian tanks and armoured cars for South African reinforcements led by armoured cars; 167 men of the 21st New Zealand Battalion were captured, the Italians apparently being just as surprised. The 6th New Zealand Brigade suffered many casualties around Point 175 and eventually retreated to Zaafran.

The 2nd New Zealand Division returned to Egypt to refit, having suffered 4,620 casualties. When the division reassembled, it was sent to Syria to recuperate and was almost returned to Asia to participate in the Asiatic-Pacific Theater after the Japanese invasion of Malaya on 7/8 December 1941.

== Background ==
=== Terrain ===
The Western Desert, is about 390 kilometres (240 mi) wide, from Mersa Matruh in Egypt to Gazala on the Libyan coast, along the Via Balbia, the only paved road. The Great Sand Sea 240 kilometres (150 mi) inland marks the southern limit of the desert at its widest points at Jaghbub (Giarabub) and Siwa Oasis; in British parlance, Western Desert came to include eastern Cyrenaica in Libya. From the coast, extending 200–300 kilometres (120–190 mi) inland, there is a flat plain of stony desert, about 150 metres (500 ft) above sea level, until it meets the Sand Sea. Scorpions, vipers and flies populate the region, which is sparsely inhabited by Bedouin nomads. Bedouin tracks linked wells and the easier traversed ground; navigation was by sun, star, compass and "desert sense" (good perception of the environment gained by experience). In the spring and summer, the days are miserably hot and the nights are very cold. The Sirocco (Gibleh or Ghibli), a hot desert wind, blows clouds of fine sand, which reduces visibility to a few yards and coats eyes, lungs, machinery, food and equipment; motor vehicles and aircraft need special oil filters and the barren ground means that water and food as well as military stores have to be transported from outside.

The winds of the Mediterranean

The area between Sollum, Maddalena, Bir el Gubi and Tobruk is larger than East Anglia and except near the coast, has a hard, flat and open surface, easy for desert-worthy vehicles to cross, except after rain. From Bardia west to El Adem the ground undulates with several east–west ridges, the north-facing sides usually being escarpments only passable by vehicles in a few places. Further north is the Via Balbia along the coast and then a jumble of wadis to the sea shore. One ridge is north of the Trigh Capuzzo track, which runs along either side of the southern escarpment. Near El Adem the Trigh Capuzzo lies between the ridges as does the Tobruk by-pass, built during the Siege of Tobruk. About 12 miles (19 km) east of El Adem, opposite Sidi Rezegh the by-pass turns north between Ed Duda, a small hill on the west side and Belhamed to the east. The area of Sidi Rezegh, Ed Duda and Belhamed was an Axis transport bottleneck which gave it great tactical importance to both sides. Point 175 was a rise on the escarpment just east of Sidi Rezegh, with a cairn and a nearby blockhouse.

=== Eighth Army plan ===
The Eighth Army planned to engage and destroy the tanks of the Afrika Korps with the tanks of XXX Corps (Lieutenant-General Willoughby Norrie) in the 7th Armoured Division (Major-General William Gott), while the 1st South African Division (Major-General George Brink) covered their left flank. On the right flank, XIII Corps (Lieutenant-General Alfred Reade Godwin-Austen), supported by the 4th Armoured Brigade Group (Brigadier Alexander Gatehouse), would make a clockwise flanking advance west of Sidi Omar with the 2nd New Zealand Division (Major-General Bernard Freyberg), while the 4th Indian Division contained the Axis frontier posts. The New Zealanders were to hold a position threatening the rear of the line of Axis defensive strong points, east from Sidi Omar to the coast at Halfaya. When the Axis tanks had been defeated, XXX Corps was to continue north-west to Tobruk and rendezvous with a break-out by the 70th Infantry Division garrison. (Note: There was also a deception plan to persuade the Axis that the main Allied attack would not be ready until early December and would be a sweeping outflanking move through Giarabub (Jaghbub), an oasis on the edge of the Great Sand Sea, more than 150 miles (240 km) to the south of the real point of attack.)

If the Axis garrisons at the frontier tried to retreat, the New Zealanders and the rest of XIII Corps were to cut them off or closely pursue them if they escaped. To protect the western flank of XIII Corps, the 4th Armoured Brigade Group had been detached from XXX Corps but remained under command, ready to intervene in support of either corps. At a conference on 6 October, Freyberg insisted that the New Zealand Division should not engage Axis armoured units without British tanks under command, unless the opposing tanks forces had already been defeated. If the brigade group was called on by both corps, Freyberg wanted priority but this was refused, although the brigade group was still ordered to stay close to XIII Corps on the frontier, a compromise much to the dismay of Godwin-Austen and Freyberg in XIII Corps and the armoured commanders in XXX Corps, who wanted to keep their tanks concentrated.

== Prelude ==
On 23 November, the 6th New Zealand Brigade of the 2nd New Zealand Division advanced westwards along the Trigh Capuzzo to Point 175, preparatory to descending the valley to Sidi Rezegh. Minefields delayed the move and the last leg began at 3:00 a.m. on 24 November. As dawn broke the New Zealanders realised that they had arrived at Bir el Chleta by mistake; the headquarters staff of the Afrika Korps discovered that they had been surrounded by the New Zealanders by mistake and were taken prisoner. Point 175 was held by I and II battalions of the 361st Afrika Regiment of the Division z.b.V. Afrika, which had an unusually large number of machine-guns and mortars. The New Zealanders and the attached Infantry tanks from the 1st Army Tank Brigade overran the German defenders and took 200 prisoners.

By 25 November the 6th and 4th New Zealand brigades had advanced westwards from Point 175 along the Trigh Capuzzo, the valleys either side and along the Sidi Rezegh ridge. The 4th Brigade reached Zaafran to the north by dawn and the 6th Brigade arrived, via the blockhouse 2 miles (3.2 km) west of Point 175, at Sidi Rezegh airfield. After a night attack on Sidi Rezegh ridge on 25 November, Belhamed was captured. The 6th Brigade was partly pinned down on the airfield and partly forced down the escarpment near the Sidi Rezegh tomb. The Tobruk garrison broke out and captured Ed Duda on 26 November as the New Zealanders repulsed a German counter-attack. During the night the 6th New Zealand Brigade attacked again and annihilated a Bersaglieri battalion, during the capture of all of the Sidi Rezegh ridge. The 19th Battalion made a flank march to Ed Duda and linked with the Tobruk garrison.

== Battle ==
=== 29 November ===
On the morning of 29 November, the 15th Panzer Division set off west, travelling south of Sidi Rezegh. The remnants of the 21st Panzer Division (Generalmajor Johann von Ravenstein) were supposed to be moving up on the right to form a pincer but were in disarray after Ravenstein failed to return from a morning reconnaissance. Ravenstein had been captured at Point 175 to the east of Sidi Rezegh, by the 21st New Zealand Battalion. Just after 5:00 p.m., the 21st Battalion was overrun by elements of the 132nd Armoured Division Ariete (General Mario Balotta). Having defeated several half-hearted armoured attacks from the 4th and 22nd Armoured brigades, which added to the confusion south of Point 175, Balotta had ordered the division to keep moving north to the escarpment and the Ariete Division had then turned west at a speed of 6 mph (9.7 km/h) towards Point 175. The Italians were in khaki uniforms, had hatches open and waved black berets, which looked like Tank Corps attire, at the occupants of Point 175. The New Zealanders, having received a 250-lorry supply convoy earlier in the day and expecting the arrival of the 1st South African Brigade from the south-west, mistook the Italian tanks for South African Marmon-Herrington armoured cars and were wrong-footed. The New Zealanders emerged from cover to wave them in, only to find that they had been overrun by Italian tanks and Bersaglieri, who took about 200 men the 21st Battalion prisoner. (Note: The official history of the 21st Battalion omits the nationality of the attacking party, while the history of the 26th Battalion claims that the Italians thought that Point 175 was in German hands and were as surprised as the New Zealanders.) Howard Kippenberger wrote after the war,

About 5:30 p.m. damned 132nd Armoured Division Ariete turned up. They passed with five tanks leading, twenty following, and a huge column of transport and guns, and rolled straight over our infantry on Pt. 175.

The 24th and 26th battalions met a similar fate at Sidi Rezegh on 30 November and on 1 December, a German armoured attack on Belhamed, practically destroyed the 20th Battalion. In the attacks, the New Zealanders suffered 880 dead, 1,699 wounded and 2,042 captured. The leading elements of the 15th Panzer Division reached Ed Duda but before nightfall, made little progress against determined resistance. A counter-attack by 4th Royal Tank Regiment (4th RTR) and Australian infantry, recaptured the lost positions and the German units fell back 1,000 yd (910 m) to form a new position. During 29 November, the two British armoured brigades were passive, with the 1st South African Brigade tied to the armoured brigades and unable to move in open ground without them, because of the threat from the panzer divisions. In the evening, the 1st South African Brigade was placed under command of the 2nd New Zealand Division and ordered to advance north to recapture Point 175. Wireless intercepts had led the Eighth Army Headquarters to believe that the 21st Panzer Division and the Ariete Division were in trouble and Lieutenant-General Neil Ritchie ordered the 7th Armoured Division to "stick to them like hell".

=== 30 November ===
Following the rebuff at Ed Duda, Rommel withdrew the 15th Panzer Division to Bir Bu Creimisa, 5 mi (8.0 km) to the south, for an attack north-eastwards on 30 November, aiming between Sidi Rezegh and Belhamed, leaving Ed Duda outside the encirclement. In the mid-afternoon, the 6th New Zealand Brigade, whose four battalions were down to about 200 men each, was attacked at the western end of the Sidi Rezegh position. The 24th Battalion was overrun as were two companies of 26th Battalion, losing 600 prisoners and several guns. On the eastern flank, the 25th Battalion repulsed an attack from the Ariete Division from Point 175. Freyberg requested permission to withdraw the remnants of the brigade into the Tobruk perimeter but this was refused, because the 1st South African Brigade was due to recapture Point 175 with a night attack from the east, covered by the 4th Armoured Brigade. By dawn the South Africans were 1 mi (1.6 km) short, having knocked out about 19 tanks of the Ariete Division.

=== 1 December ===
At 6:15 a.m. on 1 December, the 15th Panzer Division attacked again towards Belhamed, supported by a massed artillery bombardment, to drive the New Zealanders back from the Tobruk perimeter. The 4th New Zealand Brigade was eventually forced back and the 20th Battalion was overrun, cutting the division in two. During the morning, the 7th Armoured Division had been ordered to advance and "counter-attack the enemy's tanks at all costs" and the 4th Armoured Brigade Group arrived north of Sidi Rezegh and at the positions of the 6th New Zealand Brigade at around 9:00 a.m., outnumbering the c. 40 German tanks attacking the position. New orders were received from Gott to cover the withdrawal of the remains of the New Zealanders to the south, which the tank regiments prepared to cover. During the morning, Freyberg had seen a signal from the Eighth Army HQ, indicating that the South African Brigade were now to be under command of the 7th Armoured Division.

At about 2:00 p.m., Freyberg signalled that without the South Africans, his position would be untenable and that he intended to withdraw. The New Zealanders were only in touch with Norrie the corps commander, who approved the decision. The weather was poor but the Desert Air Force had concentrated on the El Adem area in support of the New Zealanders and the Tobruk garrison. The 15th Panzer Division renewed its attack at 4:30 p.m. after replenishing and the New Zealanders became involved in a desperate fighting withdrawal from their western positions. The division was formed up by 5:30 p.m. and having paused an hour for the tanks and artillery to join them from the west, set off for Zaafran at 6:45 p.m. The New Zealanders, under bombardment from both flanks, retired north-east along the divisional axis towards Zaafran, which was 5 mi (8.0 km) east of Belhamed and slightly further north-east of Sidi Rezegh.

== Aftermath ==
=== Analysis ===
At Maaten Baggush, Freyberg wrote a report on recent operations, in which he described how the Afrika Korps had been trapped but that the breaking up of British divisions into battle groups had led to them being defeated piecemeal and the Afrika Korps had managed to escape, a conclusion rejected by Auchinleck. Mindful of his obligations to the New Zealand government and the right of appeal if he thought that the division was being imperilled, Freyberg then revived a suggestion that the division be sent to Syria, which was accepted on 13 December. After the outbreak of war in the Far East, with Japanese landings in Malaya on the night of 7/8 December, the New Zealand Division was one of the divisions in the Middle East intended to return to Asia along with Australian divisions. The offer of an American division to the New Zealand government, persuaded it to consent to the New Zealand Division remaining in Syria.

=== Casualties ===
The 2nd New Zealand Division began Operation Crusader with 20,000 men, of whom 879 were killed or died of wounds, 1,699 men were wounded, 2,042 were taken prisoner (103 prisoners died from all causes), total casualties for the division being 4,620 men. The Ariete Division had an establishment of 6,231 men and had 4,731 personnel losses (76 per cent) during Operation Crusader.

=== Subsequent operations ===
The division reached the XXX Corps lines with little further interruption, where Freyberg concluded that the division must withdraw from the battle and refit, which was agreed to by Norrie. In the early hours the 3,500 men and 700 vehicles which had escaped, drove east then cut south across the Trigh Capuzzo and retired to the Egyptian border; the 19th Battalion and part of the 20th Battalion joined the Tobruk garrison.

On the frontier, the 2nd South African Division was ordered to prevent Axis supplies being sent west from Bardia and to mop up Axis positions as soon as an opportunity appeared. The 5th New Zealand Brigade remained under South African command and the rest of the New Zealanders were ordered back to the Baggush Box to refit. The retreat from Zaafran left more than 1,000 New Zealanders of 18 Battalion, half of 19 Battalion and many gunners in the Tobruk corridor, 3,500 (apart from wounded) in Tobruk, more than 3,200 in the 5th New Zealand Brigade outside Bardia and hundreds of patients and staff in the New Zealand Medical Dressing Station (MDS) that had been captured.

A lull occurred on 3 December and next day, the cost of the fighting to the Germans was established by German staff officers and a German attack near Ed Duda was repulsed. A report that Bir el Gubi was under attack arrived in the afternoon and Rommel ordered the Afrika Korps to concentrate against the threat of attacks from the south. Amidst much confusion and indecision from 4–7 December, both sides skirmished and during the night Rommel ordered the Axis forces to abandon the besieged forces on the Egyptian frontier and retreat to Gazala.

== Order of Battle ==
=== 2nd New Zealand Division, 1 December 1941 ===
Data from Murphy 1961 unless indicated

Battle HQ

- HQ 4th and 6th New Zealand brigades
- C Squadron, Divisional Cavalry
- 8the Royal Tank Regiment (two tanks)
- 44th Royal Tank Regiment (admin. transport)
- 4th and 6th Field Regiments, 8th Field Regiment, RA and 47th Field Battery
- 31st, 33rd and 34th batteries, 7th Anti-Tank Regiment
- 41st and 43rd batteries, 14th Light Anti-Aircraft Regiment
- 65th Anti-Tank Regiment, RA (less one battery)
- 1st Survey Troop
- 5th Field Park Company
- 6th and 8th Field Companies RE
- Battle HQ Signals and E, J and L Sections Divisional Signals, and two tentacles of Tactical Air Support Control Signals
- 19th Battalion (Zaaforce)
- 20th Battalion (admin. transport)
- 21st, 24th, 25th and 26th battalions
- 2nd and 3rd Companies, 27th Machine-Gun Battalion
- 4th Field Ambulance (ADS)

== See also ==
- List of British military equipment of World War II(New Zealand equipment mostly British and no list yet for WWII New Zealand equipment)
- List of Italian military equipment in World War II
