= Action at Bir el Gubi (November 1941) =

Military action of Operation Crusader in World War II

- Part of Operation Crusader during the Second World War
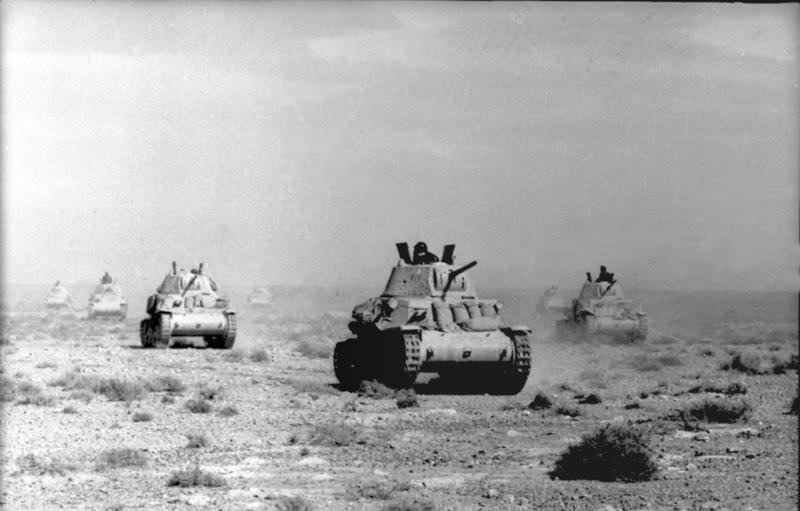
- Italian M13/40 tanks in North Africa.
Date	19 November 1941
Location	Biʾr al-Ġubbiyy, Italian Libya 31.5374°N 24.0307°E
Result	Italian victory

Belligerents
United Kingdom	Italy

Commanders and leaders
(United Kingdom) John Scott-Cockburn	(Kingdom of Italy) Mario Balotta

Units involved
22nd Armoured Brigade	132nd Armoured Division "Ariete"

Casualties and losses
100 killed and wounded; 32 captured; 52 tanks destroyed	95 killed and wounded; 82 missing; 12 guns lost; 34 tanks destroyed; 15 damaged

The Action at Bir el Gubi (November 1941) (First Battle of Bir el Gubi Italian: prima battaglia di Bir el Gobi, Arabic: بئر الغبي, romanized: Biʾr al-Ġubbiyy, lit. 'Well of the Depressed Terrain') took place on 19 November 1941 near Biʾr al-Ġubbiyy, Libya. The action was one of the opening engagements of Operation Crusader in North Africa and was a success for the Italian armoured forces.

== Background ==
On 15 November 1941 General Claude Auchinleck, commander of the Eighth Army, launched Operation Crusader, aimed at forcing the Axis army in Libya to lift the siege of Tobruk and if possible, to force the Axis to retreat from Cyrenaica. The Eighth Army was composed of the XIII Corps, formed of infantry divisions, and XXX Corps, which included the 7th Armoured Division, formerly belonging to the Western Desert Force and one of the authors of the destruction of the Tenth Army during Operation Compass. The British plan was to circumvent the Italo-German positions on their southern side with the 7th Armoured Division, and then to attack the Axis forces besieging Tobruk.

Erwin Rommel was planning a new attack on Tobruk and had therefore gathered his forces on the north-west, between Tobruk and the Egyptian border, near the coast. The Ariete Division was given the task of facing the XIII Corps (on the eastern flank) and defending the road junction at Bir el Gubi, from where supplies headed for Bir Hakeim, Giarabub, Sidi Omar, Tobruk and El Adem were sent.

== Prelude ==
=== Forces involved ===
The Italian 132nd Armored Division "Ariete" (General Mario Balotta) included the 132nd Tank Infantry Regiment with three battalions (VII, VIII, IX tank battalions M13/40) equipped with M13/40 medium tanks, the 32nd Tank Infantry Regiment with three tank battalions L (I, II, III) equipped with obsolete L3/35 tankettes, the 8th Bersaglieri Regiment with two motorised Bersaglieri battalions (V and XII) and one support weapons battalion (III), the 132nd Artillery Regiment "Ariete" with two 75/27 mm gun groups, one Blackshirt Artillery Militia (Milmart) Battery with three 102/35 gun trucks and one section of the 6th Milmart Battery with two 102/35 gun trucks. As the 32nd Tank Regiment was deployed far away and would not take part in the battle with its L3 tankettes, the Italian forces involved in the battle would be about 130 M13/40 medium tanks.

The British force for the attack on Bir el Gubi consisted of the 22nd Armoured Brigade (Brigadier John Scott-Cockburn) consisting of the 2nd Royal Gloucestershire Hussars and the 3rd and 4th County of London Yeomanry, one motorised infantry company of the 1st Battalion King's Royal Rifle Corps, one battery of the 4th Regiment Royal Horse Artillery with eight 25 pounder gun-howitzers, one anti-tank section with 2-pounder anti-tank guns, one light anti-aircraft battery with Bofors 40 mm guns, and the 11th Hussars as a reconnaissance unit. The British had 150 Crusader tanks and several armoured cars.

== Action ==
On 15 November the "Ariete" Division, facing the XXX Corps on the eastern flank, was re-deployed on the southern flank, as concentrations of British forces (the 7th Armoured Division) had been detected near Fort Maddalena. The defence was then re-organised in a line of strongholds held by Bersaglieri, directly supported by 47/32 mm guns, 81 mm mortars and the indirect support of 75/27 mm batteries. Fortification work started at once and was continued until noon on 18 November. The 7th Armoured Division comprised the 4th Armoured Brigade, 7th Armoured Brigade and the 22nd Armoured Brigade (the latter having been detached from the 1st Armoured Division). The 4th moved directly north from its bases, to support the advance of XXX Corps, while the 7th headed for the airfield at Sidi Rezegh and the 22nd (on the left flank of the 7th) headed for Bir el Gubi, to drive off the "Ariete" Division and then attack the 21st Panzer Division from the rear. The 22nd Armoured Brigade was preceded by the armoured cars of the 11th Hussars Regiment, employed as a scouting force.

=== 18 November ===
At 14:00 on 18 November the British armoured cars (B Squadron, 11th Hussars) were spotted about 6.2 mi (10 km) south east of Bir el Gubi by a platoon of Italian M13/40 tanks, which closed in on them and opened fire. The armoured cars, having a higher speed, easily disengaged. The oncoming darkness prevented a section of Royal Horse Artillery from approaching to allow the armoured cars to carry on the reconnaissance. British aircraft bombed the bulk of the "Ariete" Division, wounding some men and destroying a tractor of the 132nd Artillery Regiment. Upon learning of the British appearance, Balotta ordered his division to assume a defensive formation. The front line held by the Bersaglieri was shortened, and the five Milmart gun trucks were deployed just north of Bir el Gubi; the 132nd Tank Regiment was deployed 3.7 mi (6 km) north-west of Bir el Gubi, to repel potential counter-attacks and to cover the road to El Adem. The 3rd, 5th and 12th Bersaglieri Battalions held the defensive line.

=== 19 November ===
In the morning of 19 November, the 22nd Armoured Brigade moved towards Bir el Gubi, again preceded by armoured cars of the 11th Hussars. The 3rd Company of the VII Tank Battalion (M13/40 tanks), supported by a section of 75/27 guns, counter-attacked and forced the armoured cars to retreat. The Italian tanks were uncovered on their right flank; 25-pdr fire from the Royal Horse Artillery prevented them from advancing, and they were circumvented and attacked from the rear by the Crusaders of H/2 Squadron, Royal Gloucestershire Hussars. The Italian tanks destroyed eight Crusader tanks, the Italians lost three M13/40s (and several men, including three officers) in the fight and then retreated to their lines, along with the artillery section.

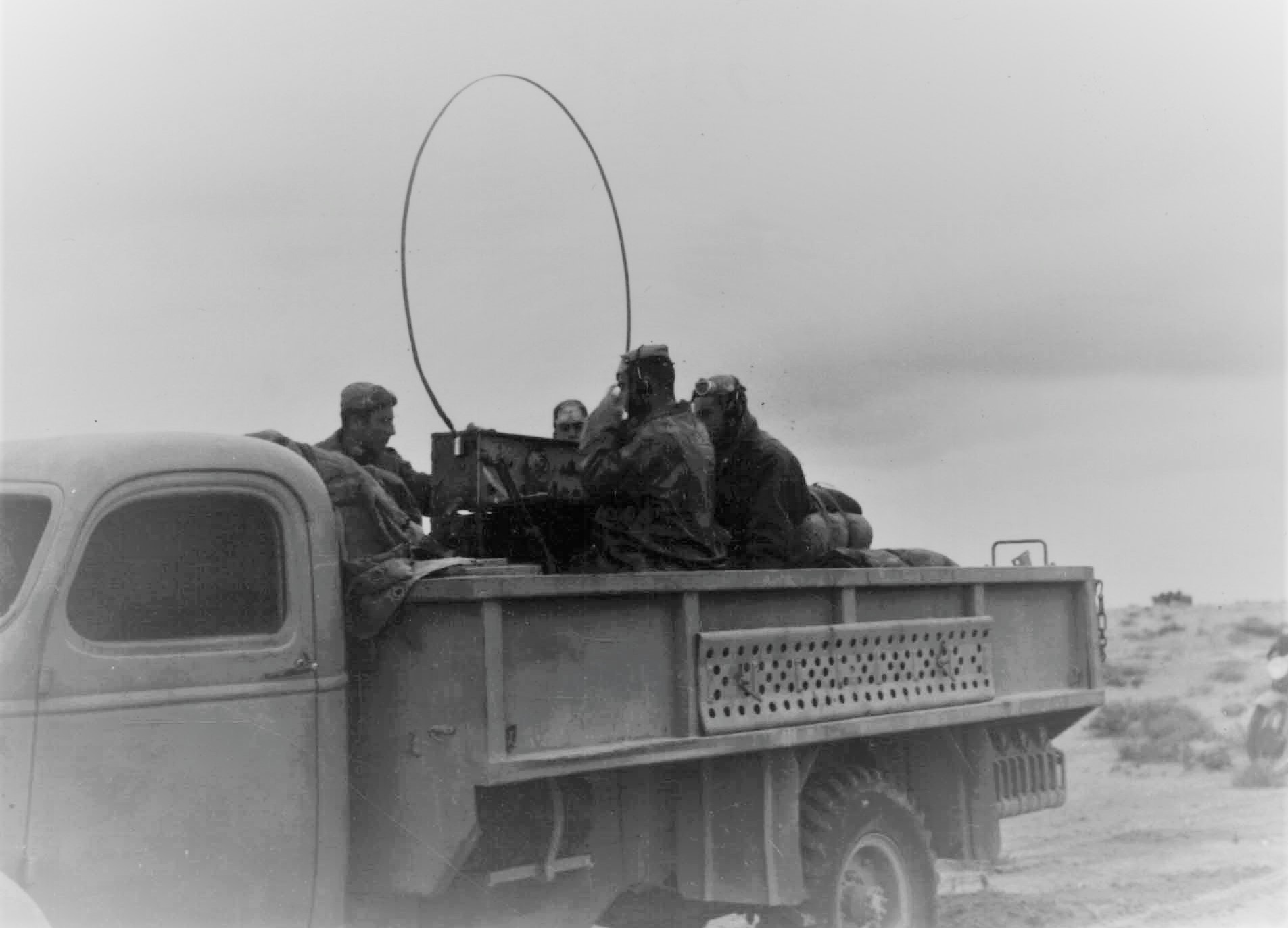
Italian military personnel in a radio truck, Bir el Gubi, November 1941

After this action, the armoured cars of the 11th Hussars returned to the front of the brigade and around 12:00, they sighted the Bersaglieri defensive line about 2.8 mi (4.5 km) south of Bir el Gubi. At 10:30 the 22nd Armoured Brigade, supported by Royal Horse Artillery fire, advanced with 2nd Royal Gloucestershire Hussars on the right and 4th County of London Yeomanry on the left, with the 3rd County of London Yeomanry in reserve. The first Italian unit to be engaged was the III Bersaglieri Infantry Support Gun Battalion; not having fully deployed yet, the battalion was overrun by the tanks of H/2 Squadron, Royal Gloucestershire Hussars. A platoon of M13/40 tanks of IX Battalion was sent to help the Bersaglieri, but was destroyed by the combined action of G and H Squadrons, 2nd Royal Gloucestershire Hussars, the Italian platoon commander being among the killed. F Squadron, 2nd Royal Gloucestershire Hussars instead faced the V Bersaglieri Battalion, which, being well-entrenched and supported by Milmart artillery, halted the British advance.

The British tanks regrouped and F and G Squadrons, 2nd Royal Gloucestershire Hussars managed to break through the line held by the III Infantry Gun Battalion, thus opening their way north. The 4th County of London Yeomanry headed towards the (not yet fortified) positions held by the XII Bersaglieri Battalion, but A Squadron, leading the attack, was stopped by Italian artillery fire. B Squadron attempted to overtake the Italian right flank, to outflank the Bersaglieri battalion. Several British tanks managed to break through the strongholds and they cut off the regimental command, which rejoined XII Battalion with difficulty.

The situation had become desperate for the Italian defenders. At 13:30, the 132nd Tank Regiment began a counter-attack; the 1st Company of the VII Tank Battalion, closely followed by the 2nd Company and by the entire VIII Battalion (60 Italian tanks), was sent south to attack the 2nd Royal Gloucestershire Hussars. The Italian tanks attacked the two British regiments, eventually outflanking them and forcing them to retreat. C Squadron, 4th County of London Yeomanry was sent to try to circumvent the Bersaglieri positions but the attempt was stopped by the fire of the Italian anti-tank guns and by the Milmart gun trucks, which inflicted many casualties on the British troops.

The 3rd County of London Yeomanry was moved to cover the right flank of 2nd Royal Gloucestershire Hussars and surprised the Italian tank platoon that had outflanked the Royal Gloucestershire Hussars on the right side; the British tanks quickly defeated the Italian tanks, then left B Squadron in defensive formation to keep contact with the other regiment while the British regimental command advanced. The British force ran into the Bersaglieri anti-tank defences, which soon knocked out four tanks, including that of the regimental commander.

At 16:30, the 2nd Royal Gloucestershire Hussars were forced to retreat under pressure from Italian tanks and constantly kept under the fire of anti-tank guns and gun trucks. The 4th County of London Yeomanry also withdrew and the 3rd County of London Yeomanry, which had been less worn out by the previous fight, was ordered at 16:50 to regroup to try a new attack but the losses suffered induced a countermand at 17:50. The attack of 22nd Armoured Brigade had failed.

== Aftermath ==
=== Analysis ===
The Action at Bir el Gubi was a notable victory for the Italians. With their forces unexpectedly tied up with the Italians, only one full-strength British armoured regiment reached Sidi Rezegh, where it was crushed by the Afrika Korps. The defeat marked the failure of the initial British move in Crusader, which later defeated the Italian−German forces in a battle of attrition and forced them to retreat. The British attacked with Crusader tanks with long-range artillery support but no infantry. The "Ariete" Division had adopted the German practice of tank–infantry coordination while training with the Panzer units of the Afrika Korps during the previous months and had put it to good use at Bir el Gubi.

=== Casualties ===
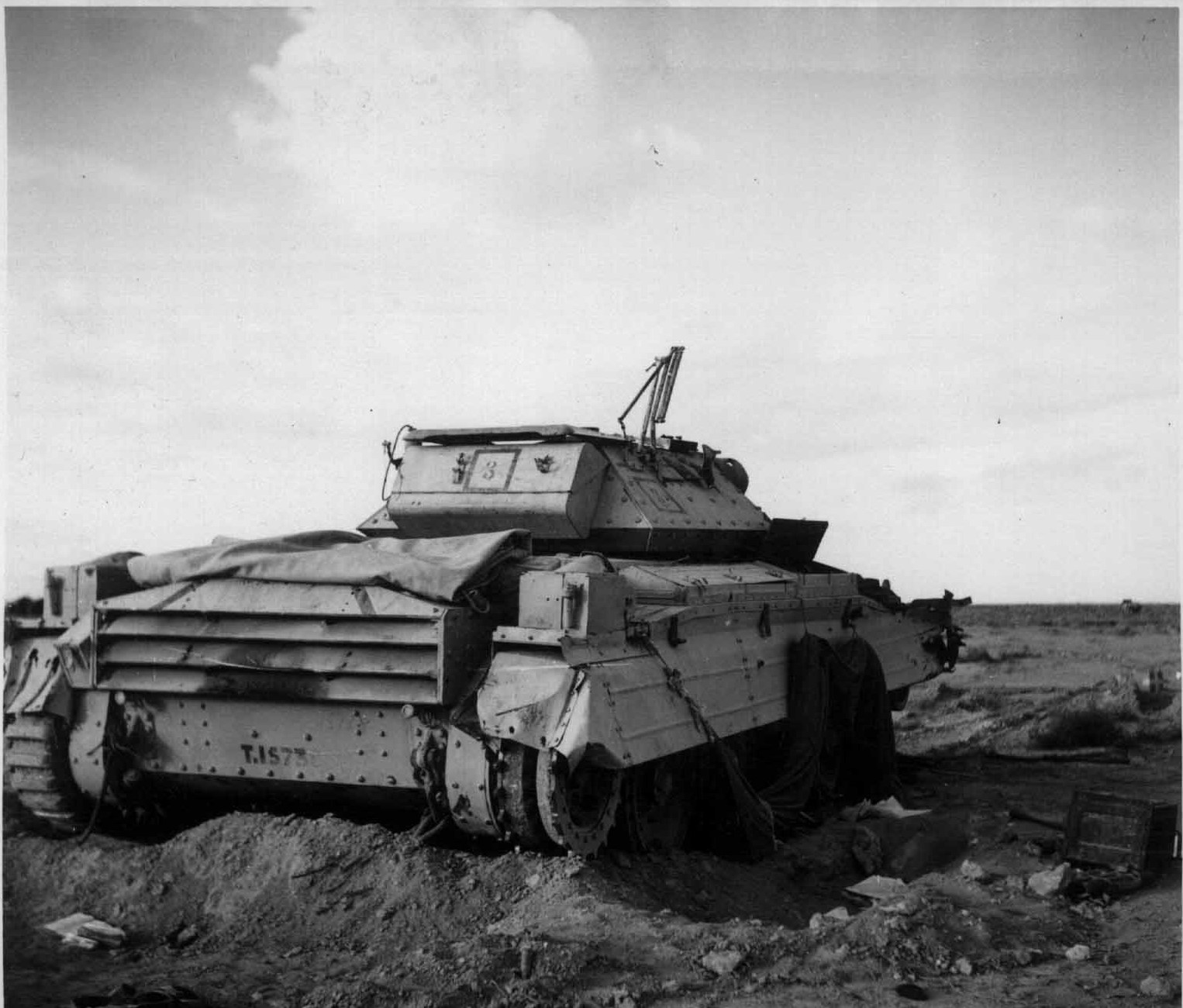
A British Crusader tank abandoned at Bir el Gubi in the winter of 1941.

The 132nd Tank Regiment lost 95 men killed and wounded, 82 missing, 12 guns, 34 tanks destroyed and 15 damaged The 8th Bersaglieri Regiment suffered 9 killed, 18 wounded and 17 missing and the 132nd Artillery Regiment had six wounded and lost one gun and three vehicles. (Note: The term missing is the difference between those entering the battle and those accounted for after the battle, so it covers not only deaths where the location of the body is not known, but also those taken prisoner, of which, after this battle, there were many.)

British tank losses are debated, the 2nd Royal Gloucestershire Hussars lost 30 tanks and 50 men (11 killed, 19 wounded and 20 missing), the 4th County of London Yeomanry lost eight tanks and 26 men (4 killed and 22 missing) and the 3rd County of London Yeomanry reported the loss of four tanks, six men killed and an unspecified number of wounded. Nearly all of the British missing were taken prisoner. Some sources claim that whereas British war diaries revealed accurate losses for the 2nd Royal Gloucestershire Hussars and the 4th County of London Yeomanry, the losses reportedly suffered by the 3rd County of London Yeomanry were incomplete, as they were all related to one squadron, while the war diaries contain no information about the other squadrons for several days. In 1986, Correlli Barnett wrote that British lost 52 tanks at Bir el Gubi.

== Orders of battle ==
=== British ===
- 22nd Armoured Brigade
  - 2nd Royal Gloucestershire Hussars
    - 158 Crusader tanks
  - 3rd County of London Yeomanry (Sharpshooters)
  - 4th County of London Yeomanry

=== Italian ===
- 132nd Armoured Division "Ariete"
  - 132nd Tank Infantry Regiment
    - 146 × M13/40 tanks
  - 8th Bersaglieri Regiment
  - 132nd Artillery Regiment "Ariete"

== See also ==
- Operation Crusader
- 132nd Armoured Division Ariete
- List of British military equipment of World War II
- List of Italian military equipment in World War II
