= 33rd Tank Regiment (Italy) =

Inactive Italian Army tank unit

- 33° Reggimento Carri
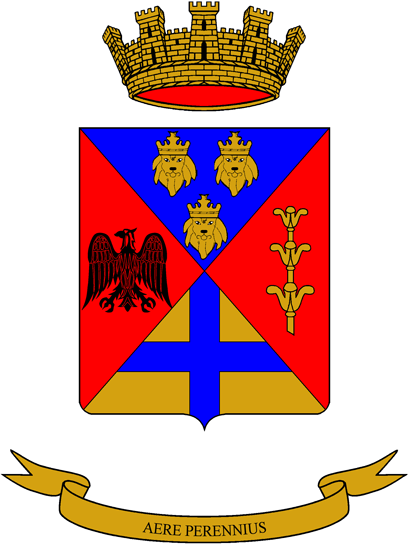
- Regimental coat of arms
- Active: 6 Nov. 1939 — 8 Sept. 1943; 1 Nov. 1976 — 31 Aug. 2001
- Country: Italy
- Branch: Italian Army
- Part of: 132nd Armored Brigade "Ariete"
- Garrison/HQ: Ozzano dell'Emilia
- Motto: "Aere Perennius"
- Anniversaries: 1 October 1927

Insignia
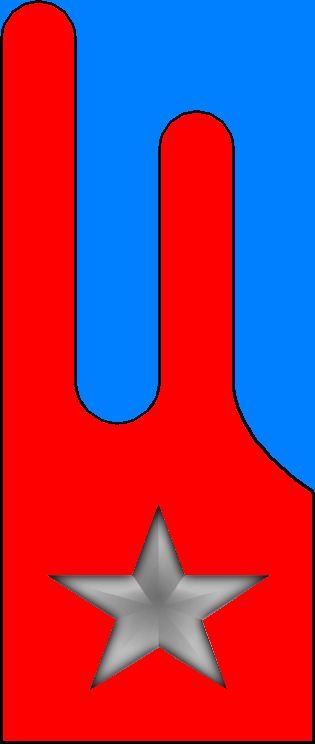
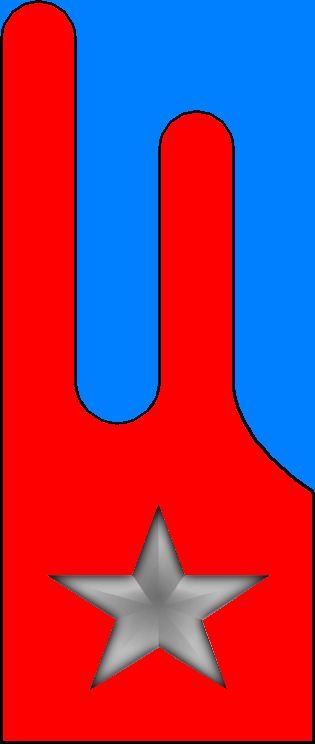
- Tank units gorget patches

The 33rd Tank Regiment (Italian: 33° Reggimento Carri) is an inactive tank regiment of the Italian Army, which was based in Ozzano dell'Emilia in the Emilia Romagna and last operationally assigned to the 132nd Armored Brigade "Ariete". The regiment was formed in November 1939 by the Royal Italian Army and assigned to the 133rd Armored Division "Littorio". In June 1940, the regiment participated in the Italian invasion of France and in April 1941 in the invasion of Yugoslavia. In November 1941, the regiment was replaced by the 133rd Tank Infantry Regiment as the tank regiment of the 133rd Armored Division "Littorio". Afterwards the regiment trained tank and self-propelled gun units, until German forces disbanded the regiment after the announcement of the Armistice of Cassibile on 8 September 1943.

In 1976, the regiment's flag and traditions were assigned to the 6th Tank Battalion "M.O. Scapuzzi", which had become an autonomous unit on 1 November 1976 and been assigned to the Mechanized Brigade "Granatieri di Sardegna". In 1993, the 6th Tank Battalion "M.O. Scapuzzi" lost its autonomy and entered the 4th Tank Regiment, while the flag of the 33rd Tank Regiment was transferred to Ozzano dell'Emilia, where the 33rd Tank Regiment was reformed and assigned the 11th Tank Battalion "M.O. Calzecchi". From 1993 to 1997, the regiment was assigned to the Mechanized Brigade "Friuli", and then to the 132nd Armored Brigade "Ariete". Originally the unit, like all Italian tank units, was part of the army's infantry arm, but on 1 June 1999 the tankers specialty was transferred from the infantry arm to the cavalry arm. Consequently, on the same date the regiment replaced its flag with a cavalry standard. In 2001, the regiment was disbanded and the standard of the 33rd Tank Regiment was transferred to the Shrine of the Flags in the Vittoriano in Rome for safekeeping. The regiment's anniversary falls, as for all tank units, which have not yet distinguished themselves in the battle, on 1 October 1927, the day the tankers speciality was founded.

== History ==
=== World War II ===
On 6 November 1939, the 33rd Tank Infantry Regiment was formed in Parma. The new regiment received the XXII Tank Battalion L and XXIII Tank Battalion L from the 1st Tank Infantry Regiment and the VI Tank Battalion L and XXXII Tank Battalion L from the 3rd Tank Infantry Regiment. The battalions were equipped with L3/35 tankettes with the L standing for Italian: "Leggero" or "Light". The regiment was assigned to the 133rd Armored Division "Littorio", which had been formed on the same date and also included the 12th Bersaglieri Regiment and 133rd Armored Artillery Regiment. In April 1940, the regiment's battalions were renumbered and the regiment then consisted of the following units:

- 33rd Tank Infantry Regiment, in Parma
  - I Tank Battalion L (former VI Tank Battalion L)
  - II Tank Battalion L (former XXII Tank Battalion L)
  - III Tank Battalion L (former XXIII Tank Battalion L)
  - IV Tank Battalion L (former XXXII Tank Battalion L)

=== World War II ===
On 10 June 1940, the regiment participated in the Italian invasion of France. The 101st Motorized Division "Trieste" and 133rd Armored Division "Littorio" were sent to the Aosta Valley to exploit a planned breakthrough at the Little St Bernard Pass, which was to be achieved by the 1st Alpine Division "Taurinense" on the left flank and the 2nd Alpine Division "Tridentina" on the right flank, with the Trieste division in the center. After the initial attack failed the I Tank Battalion L of the 33rd Tank Infantry Regiment was sent forward on 24 June 1940, but the L3/35 tankettes became bogged down in the rugged and snowy terrain. French anti-tank gunners then destroyed a number of Italian tankettes and the battalion withdrew. The same day the Franco-Italian Armistice came into effect and the war ended.

In summer 1940, the I Tank Battalion L was transferred to Libya, where it participated in the Western Desert campaign. On 22 December 1940, the regiment was ordered to form a new tank battalion, which was designated VI Tank Battalion M13/40. The battalion was equipped with M13/40 tanks with the M standing for Italian: "Medio" or "Medium". In January 1941, the VI Tank Battalion M13/40 was rushed to Libya to shore up the disintegrating Italian 10th Army, which was crumbling under heavy British pressure during the British Operation Compass. On 22 January 1941, the VI Tank Battalion M13/40 arrived at Benghazi, with thirty-seven M13/40s tanks and another thirty-six M13/40s for the XXI Tank Battalion L, which was waiting at Benghazi to convert to the new vehicle, having lost its L3/35 tankettes in the fall of Tobruk. Neither battalion had time to acclimatise or train as both were sent to reinforce the Bignami Group (Raggruppamento Bignami of Colonel Riccardo Bignami near Suluq. Over the next days the VI Tank Battalion M13/40 was in constant contact with British forces as the remnants of the Italian 10th Army under Lieutenant General Giuseppe Tellera tried to escape the British onslaught.

On 24 January 1941, the British 7th Armoured Division dislodged the Special Armored Brigade during the action at Mechili, and the next day, on 25 January, the Australian 6th Division attacked the 60th Infantry Division "Sabratha" at Derna. On 29 January, Tellera ordered a general retreat along the Via Balbia road towards Benghazi. However, the British Combeforce had already blocked the only escape route at Beda Fomm. On 6 February, the Italians attempted to break through the British lines in the Battle of Beda Fomm, during which all but four of the M13/40s of the VI Tank Battalion M13/40 were knocked out by British tanks. General Tellera, who personally led the attack of the VI Tank Battalion M13/40 was found gravely injured in one of the destroyed M13/40 tanks after the battle by British forces and died the next day in a British field hospital. Struck by his heroic resistance, the British Army buried him with full military honours in Benghazi. The next day the remaining Italian troops surrendered and the Tenth Army ceased to exist. The VI Tank Battalion M13/40 was declared lost due to war time events.

In late March 1941, the Littorio division was transferred to the border with Yugoslavia for the invasion of Yugoslavia. On 11 April 1941, the division crossed the border and advanced to Postojna. On 12 April, the division reached Ogulin and on 14 April Šibenik on the Dalmatian Coast. The Italians encountered minimal resistance by the Yugoslavian Seventh Army and on 16 April the Littorio division met up with units of the 158th Infantry Division "Zara" in Knin and reached Mostar. On 17 April, the Littorio reached Trebinje, where it met up with units of the 131st Armored Division "Centauro", which had advanced northward from Albania. On 15 May 1941, the Littorio division returned to its bases.

The regiment then renumbered its battalions, with the II becoming the new I battalion, and the III becoming the II battalion, while the IV was redesignated as the regiment's III battalion. On 1 June 1941, the depot of the 33rd Tank Infantry Regiment in Parma formed the command of the 133rd Tank Infantry Regiment. On 30 July 1941, the III Tank Battalion L transferred its two tank companies to the regiment's I and II tank battalions and was then disbanded. In August 1941, the regiment's depot formed the XIV Tank Battalion M13/40. In October 1941, the I and II tank battalions L left the regiment and were transferred to Sardinia, where they were assigned to the 32nd Tank Infantry Regiment. On 27 November 1941, the 133rd Tank Infantry Regiment replaced the 33rd Tank Infantry Regiment as the tank regiment of the 133rd Armored Division "Littorio". Afterwards the 33rd Tank Infantry Regiment consisted of the following units:

- 33rd Tank Infantry Regiment, in Parma
  - XIV Tank Battalion M13/40
  - CDXXXIII Tank Replacements Battalion, in Fidenza
  - CDXXXIV Tank Replacements Battalion
  - Tank Training Battalion

On 1 February 1942, the regiment was reorganized as an operational unit and earmarked to receive the XVII Tank Battalion M14/41, XVIII Tank Battalion M14/41, XIX Tank Battalion M14/41, and an anti-aircraft company. However, due to operational needs the XVII Tank Battalion M14/41 was transferred from the 4th Tank Infantry Regiment to the 31st Tank Infantry Regiment, while the XIX Tank Battalion M14/41 remained assigned to the 31st Tank Infantry Regiment. On 1 July 1942, the 33rd Tank Infantry Regiment received the XVIII Tank Battalion M14/41, which was equipped with M14/41 tanks, from the 3rd Tank Infantry Regiment. In August 1942, the regiment transferred its XIV Tank Battalion M13/40 to the 31st Tank Infantry Regiment. As the XVIII Tank Battalion's M14/41 tanks were needed as replacement for units fighting in North Africa, the battalion was re-equipped with M15/42 tanks. On 15 October 1942, the 4th Tank Infantry Regiment transferred its anti-aircraft company with 20/65 mod. 35 anti-aircraft guns to the 33rd Tank Infantry Regiment. On 27 June 1943, the XVIII Tank Battalion M15/42 was transferred to Sardinia, where the battalion was assigned to the 32nd Tank Infantry Regiment. In the evening of 8 September 1943, the Armistice of Cassibile, which ended hostilities between the Kingdom of Italy and the Anglo-American Allies, was announced by General Dwight D. Eisenhower on Radio Algiers and by Marshal Pietro Badoglio on Italian radio. Germany reacted by invading Italy and the 33rd Tank Infantry Regiment was disbanded soon thereafter by German forces.

Starting in 1942, the regiment trained units equipped with self-propelled guns. On 24 April 1942, the regiment's depot formed the IV Self-propelled Battalion 47/32, which was equipped with Semovente da 47/32 self-propelled guns and assigned to the 4th Infantry Division "Livorno" in Sicily. On 1 May 1942, the depot formed the CXXXIII Self-propelled Battalion 47/32 and on 1 October 1942 the CCXXXIII Self-propelled Battalion 47/32, which were both sent to Sicily and assigned to the 6th Army. All three battalions were destroyed in July 1943 during the Allied invasion of Sicily.

=== Cold War ===
On 1 September 1964, the VI Tank Battalion was reformed in Civitavecchia and assigned to the 1st Armored Bersaglieri Regiment of the Armored Division "Centauro". The battalion was assigned the traditions of the VI Tank Battalion M13/40 and equipped M47 Patton tanks.

During the 1975 army reform the army disbanded the regimental level and newly independent battalions were granted for the first time their own flags, respectively in the case of cavalry units, their own standard. On 1 August 1975, the 1st Armored Bersaglieri Regiment was transferred from the Armored Division "Centauro" to the Infantry Division "Granatieri di Sardegna". On 1 October 1975, the VI Tank Battalion was renamed 6th Tank Battalion "M.O. Scapuzzi". On 31 October 1976, the 1st Armored Bersaglieri Regiment was disbanded and the next day the 6th Tank Battalion "M.O. Scapuzzi" became an autonomous unit and was assigned to the Mechanized Brigade "Granatieri di Sardegna", which was formed on the same day by contracting the Infantry Division "Granatieri di Sardegna". As part of the reform tank and armored battalions were named for officers, soldiers and partisans of the tank speciality, who had served in World War II and been awarded Italy's highest military honor the Gold Medal of Military Valor. The 6th Tank Battalion was named for Second Lieutenant Luigi Scapuzzi, who served as a deputy commander of a company of the CCXXXIII Self-propelled Battalion 47/32, and was killed in action on 22 July 1943 during the Allied invasion of Sicily.

The battalion consisted of a command, a command and services company, and three tank companies with M47 Patton tanks. The battalion fielded now 434 men (32 officers, 82 non-commissioned officers, and 320 soldiers). On 12 November 1976 the President of the Italian Republic Giovanni Leone assigned with decree 846 the flag and traditions of the 33rd Tank Infantry Regiment to the 6th Tank Battalion "M.O. Scapuzzi".

=== Recent times ===
With the end of the Cold War the Italian Army drew down its forces and, on 31 August 1993, the 6th Tank Battalion "M.O. Scapuzzi" in Civitavecchia lost its autonomy and transferred the flag of the 33rd Tank Regiment, which the battalion held since 1976, to Ozzano dell'Emilia, while on the same day the flag of the 4th Tank Regiment was transferred from Ozzano dell'Emilia to Civitavecchia. The next day, on 1 September 1993, the 11th Tank Battalion "M.O. Calzecchi" in Ozzano dell'Emilia entered the reformed 33rd Tank Regiment, while the 6th Tank Battalion "M.O. Scapuzzi" entered the 4th Tank Regiment. The 11th Tank Battalion "M.O. Calzecchi" was equipped with Leopard 1A2 main battle tanks and the 33rd Tank Regiment was now assigned to the Mechanized Brigade "Friuli".

As the Mechanized Brigade "Friuli" was earmarked to become an air assault brigade the 33rd Tank Regiment was transferred in 1997 to the 132nd Armored Brigade "Ariete". On 1 June 1999, the tankers specialty was transferred from the infantry arm to the cavalry arm. Consequently, on the same date the regiment replaced its flag with a cavalry standard. On 31 August 2001, the 33rd Tank Regiment was disbanded and the regiment's standard transferred to the Shrine of the Flags in the Vittoriano in Rome for safekeeping.

== See also ==
- Mechanized Brigade "Granatieri di Sardegna"
