= 11th Tank Battalion "M.O. Calzecchi" =

Inactive Italian Army tank unit

- 11° Battaglione Carri "M.O. Calzecchi"
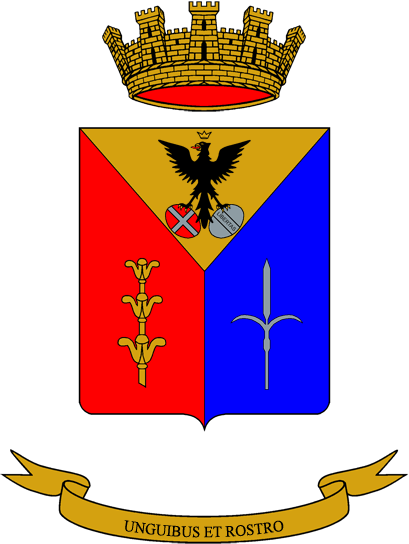
- Battalion coat of arms
- Active: 30 April 1941 — 30 Nov. 1942; 1 July 1960 — 31 Aug. 2001
- Country: Italy
- Branch: Italian Army
- Part of: Mechanized Brigade "Friuli"
- Garrison/HQ: Ozzano dell'Emilia
- Motto(s): "Unguibus et rostro"
- Anniversaries: 1 October 1927

Insignia
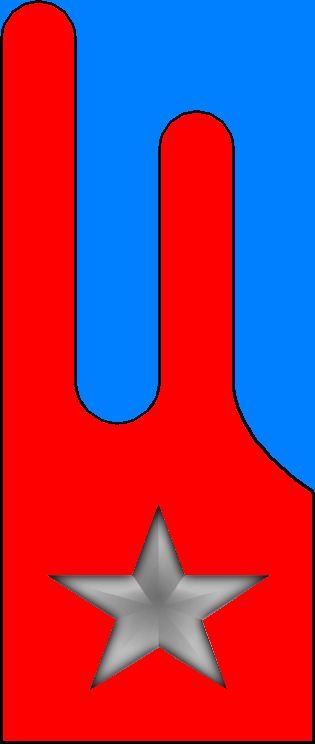
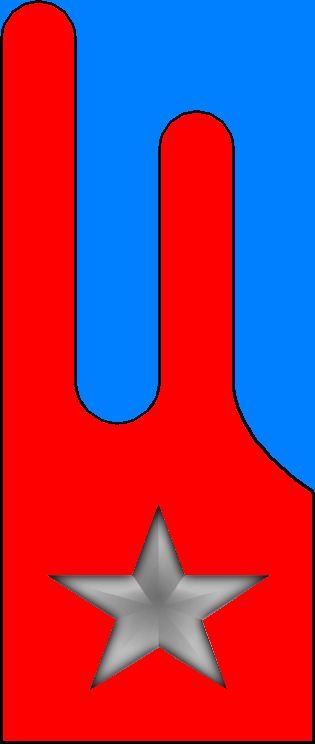
- Tank units gorget patches

The 11th Tank Battalion "M.O. Calzecchi" (Italian: 11° Battaglione Carri "M.O. Calzecchi") is an inactive tank battalion of the Italian Army, which was based in Ozzano dell'Emilia in the Emilia Romagna and last operationally assigned to the Mechanized Brigade "Friuli". The unit's lineage traces back to the World War II XI Tank Battalion M13/40, which was formed in 1941 by the depot of the 4th Tank Infantry Regiment and assigned to the 133rd Tank Infantry Regiment. In March 1942, the battalion was sent to Libya, where it was assigned in May 1942 to the 101st Motorized Division "Trieste", with which it fought in the Western Desert campaign. In November 1942, the battalion was destroyed during the Second Battle of El Alamein. In 1960, the battalion was reformed and assigned to the Infantry Division "Trieste". In 1975, the battalion was renamed 11th Tank Battalion "M.O. Calzecchi". In 1991, the battalion lost its autonomy and entered the newly formed 11th Tank Regiment "M.O. Calzecchi". In 1992, the battalion was transferred to the 4th Tank Regiment and in 1993 the battalion was assigned to the 33rd Tank Regiment. In 2001, the 33rd Tank Regiment and with it 11th Tank Battalion "M.O. Calzecchi" were disbanded.

Originally the unit, like all Italian tank units, was part of the army's infantry arm, but on 1 June 1999 the tankers specialty was transferred from the infantry arm to the cavalry arm. The battalion's anniversary falls, as for all tank units, which have not yet distinguished themselves in the battle, on 1 October 1927, the day the tankers speciality was founded.

== History ==
=== World War II ===
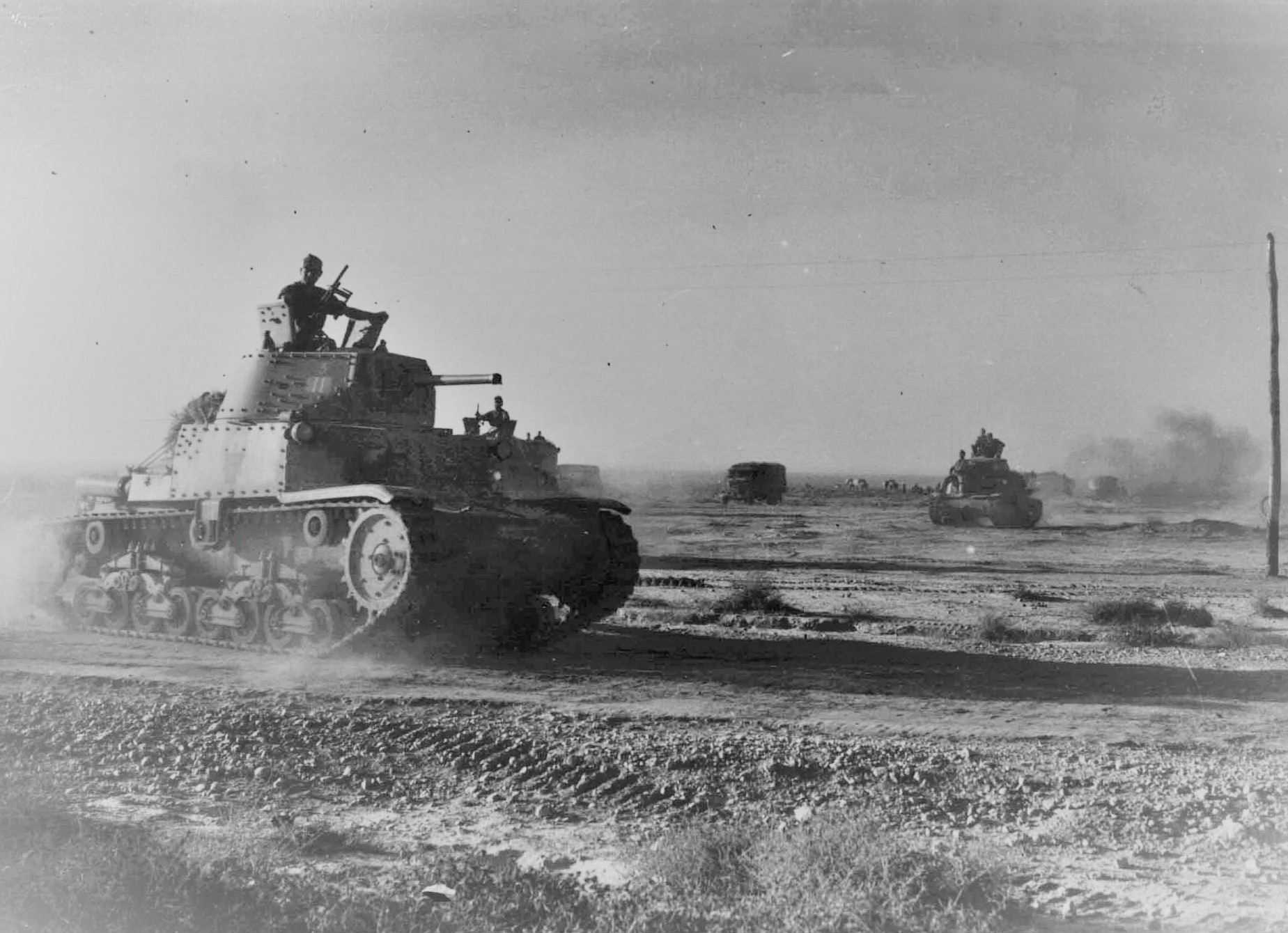
Italian M13/40 tanks on the move in the Western Desert in 1942

On 30 April 1941, the depot of the 4th Tank Infantry Regiment in Rome disbanded the VIII Tank Battalion L and used its personnel to form the XI Tank Battalion M13/40 (with M standing for Italian: "Medio" or Medium). The battalion was equipped with M13/40 tanks. On 15 June 1941, the battalion was assigned to the 133rd Tank Infantry Regiment. On 27 November 1941, the 133rd Tank Infantry Regiment was assigned to the 133rd Armored Division "Littorio" as replacement for the 33rd Tank Infantry Regiment. By March 1942, the 133rd Tank Infantry Regiment arrived Libya and from then on fought in the Western Desert Campaign. On 15 May 1942, the XI Tank Battalion M13/40 was transferred to the 101st Motorized Division "Trieste".

In May and June 1942, the battalion fought in Battle of Gazala, in June 1942 in the Axis capture of Tobruk and in the Battle of Mersa Matruh, in July 1942 in the First Battle of El Alamein, and in August and September 1942 in the Battle of Alam el Halfa. On 23 October 1942, the Second Battle of El Alamein commenced, during which the 101st Motorized Division "Trieste", 132nd Armored Division "Ariete", and 133rd Armored Division "Littorio" were destroyed on 4 November by an attack of the British 1st Armoured Division, 7th Armoured Division and 10th Armoured Division. On 30 November 1942, the XI Tank Battalion M13/40 was declared as lost due to wartime events.

The few survivors of the 132nd Tank Infantry Regiment, 133rd Tank Infantry Regiment, and XI Tank Battalion M13/40 were grouped together in the "Cantaluppi" Group, an ad hoc formation commanded by Colonel Gaetano Cantaluppi. On 5 December 1942, the group was reorganized as 132nd Anti-tank Regiment. The regiment was assigned to the 131st Armored Division "Centauro", with which it fought in the Tunisian campaign. On 18 April 1943, the 132nd Anti-tank Regiment was declared lost due to wartime events after the Battle of El Guettar.

=== Cold War ===
On 1 July 1960, the Armored Battalion "Trieste" was formed in Forlì and assigned to the Infantry Division "Trieste", which, on 20 October, of the same year was reduced to Infantry Brigade "Trieste". On 24 May 1961, the battalion was renamed XI Armored Battalion "Trieste" and, in October of the same year, the name was changed to XI Armored Battalion. During the same year the battalion moved from Forlì to Ozzano dell'Emilia. At the time the battalion consisted of a command, a command company, two tank companies with M47 Patton tanks, and a mechanized fusiliers company.

During the 1975 army reform the army disbanded the regimental level and newly independent battalions were granted for the first time their own flags, respectively in the case of cavalry units, their own standard. On 31 July 1975, the XI Tank Battalion disbanded its mechanized fusiliers company and formed a third tank company. Consequently, the battalion was renamed 11th Tank Battalion "M.O. Calzecchi". As part of the reform tank and armored battalions were named for officers, soldiers and partisans of the tank speciality, who had served in World War II and been awarded Italy's highest military honor the Gold Medal of Military Valor. The 11th Tank Battalion was named for Captain Icilio Calzecchi, who, as commanding officer of a company of the XI Tank Battalion M13/40, was killed in action on 29 May 1942 during the Battle of Gazala.

The battalion was assigned to the Mechanized Brigade "Trieste" and consisted of a command, a command and services company, and three tank companies with M47 Patton tanks. The battalion fielded now 434 men (32 officers, 82 non-commissioned officers, and 320 soldiers). On 12 November 1976, the President of the Italian Republic Giovanni Leone granted with decree 846 the 11th Tank Battalion "M.O. Calzecchi" its flag. In 1977, the battalion replaced its M47 Patton tanks with Leopard 1A2 main battle tanks.

=== Recent times ===
After the end of the Cold War the Italian Army began to draw down its forces and, on 1 June 1991, the Mechanized Brigade "Trieste" was merged into the Motorized Brigade "Friuli", which afterwards changed its name to Mechanized Brigade "Friuli". On 18 September 1991, the 11th Tank Battalion "M.O. Calzecchi" in Ozzano dell'Emilia lost its autonomy and the next day the battalion entered the newly formed 11th Tank Regiment "M.O. Calzecchi". One year later, on 18 September 1992, the 11th Tank Regiment "M.O. Calzecchi" was renamed 4th Tank Regiment, whose only battalion continued to be the 11th Tank Battalion "M.O. Calzecchi". Consequently, on 21 September 1992, the flag of the 11th Tank Regiment "M.O. Calzecchi" was transferred to the Shrine of the Flags in the Vittoriano in Rome for safekeeping.

On 31 August 1993, the 6th Tank Battalion "M.O. Scapuzzi" in Civitavecchia lost its autonomy and transferred the flag of the 33rd Tank Regiment, which had been assigned to the battalion in 1976, to Ozzano dell'Emilia, while on the same day the flag of the 4th Tank Regiment was transferred from Ozzano dell'Emilia to Civitavecchia. The next day, on 1 September 1993, the 11th Tank Battalion "M.O. Calzecchi" in Ozzano dell'Emilia entered the reformed 33rd Tank Regiment, while the 6th Tank Battalion "M.O. Scapuzzi" entered the 4th Tank Regiment.

As the Mechanized Brigade "Friuli" was earmarked to become an air assault brigade, the 33rd Tank Regiment was transferred in 1997 to the 132nd Armored Brigade "Ariete". On 31 August 2001, the 33rd Tank Regiment and with it 11th Tank Battalion "M.O. Calzecchi" were disbanded.

== See also ==
- Mechanized Brigade "Trieste"
- Mechanized Brigade "Friuli"
