= 131st Tank Regiment =

Inactive Italian Army tank unit

- 131° Reggimento Carri
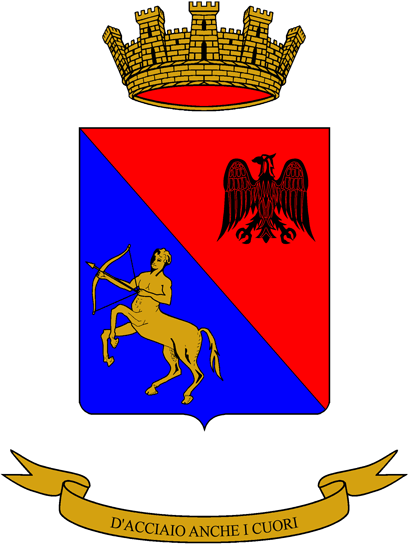
- Regimental coat of arms
- Active: 27 July 1941 — 8 Sept. 1943; 21 Oct. 1975 — 31 July 1993; 1 Sept. 1993 — 11 July 2013
- Country: Italy
- Branch: Italian Army
- Part of: Bersaglieri Brigade "Garibaldi"
- Garrison/HQ: Persano
- Motto: "D'acciaio anche i cuori"
- Anniversaries: 1 October 1927
- Decorations: 1x Gold Cross of Army Merit

Insignia
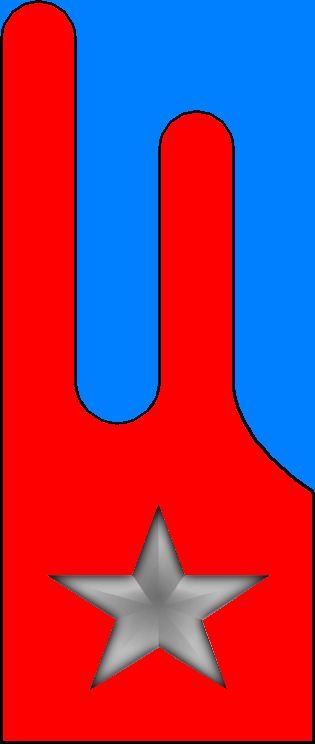
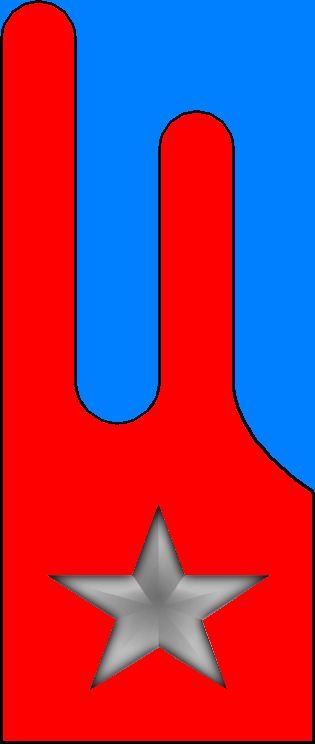
- Tank units gorget patches

The 131st Tank Regiment (Italian: 131° Reggimento Carri) is an inactive tank regiment of the Italian Army, which was based in Persano in Campania and last operationally assigned to the Bersaglieri Brigade "Garibaldi". The regiment was formed in July 1941 by the Royal Italian Army and assigned for a short time to the 131st Armored Division "Centauro". In January 1942, the regiment became an autonomous unit and was transferred to Sicily, where it fought against allied forces, which had landed on the island on 10 July 1943. The remnants of the regiment were disbanded by German forces after the announcement of the Armistice of Cassibile on 8 September 1943.

In 1976, the regiment's flag and traditions were assigned to the 101st Tank Battalion "M.O. Zappalà", which had become an autonomous unit on 21 October 1975. In 1993, the 101st Tank Battalion "M.O. Zappalà" lost its autonomy and entered the reformed 131st Tank Regiment. Originally the unit, like all Italian tank units, was part of the army's infantry arm, but on 1 June 1999 the tankers specialty was transferred from the infantry arm to the cavalry arm. Consequently, on the same date the regiment replaced its flag with a cavalry standard. In 2013, the regiment was disbanded and its standard transferred to the Shrine of the Flags in the Vittoriano in Rome for safekeeping. The regiment's anniversary falls, as for all tank units, which have not yet distinguished themselves in battle, on 1 October 1927, the day the tankers speciality was founded.

== History ==
=== World War II ===
On 27 July 1941, the depot of the 31st Tank Infantry Regiment in Siena formed the regimental command of the 131st Tank Infantry Regiment. On the same date the new regiment received three tank battalions, which had been formed earlier by the depot of the 4th Tank Infantry Regiment in Rome. The three battalions were equipped with captured French tanks. After its formation new regiment consisted of the following units:

- 131st Tank Infantry Regiment
  - Command Company
  - CI Tank Battalion R35, with R35 light tanks
  - CII Tank Battalion R35, with R35 light tanks
  - CC Tank Battalion SOMUA, with SOMUA S35 tanks

The CI and CII battalions fielded each three companies with 18× R35 tanks per company, while the CC battalion fielded two companies with 16× SOMUA S35 tanks per company. On 15 August 1941, the regiment was transferred to Friuli, where it joined the 131st Armored Division "Centauro", which also included the 31st Tank Infantry Regiment, 5th Bersaglieri Regiment, and 131st Artillery Regiment "Centauro". On 25 December 1941, the CC Tank Battalion SOMUA left the regiment and was transferred to Sardinia, where it was assigned to the XIII Army Corps, which was tasked with the defence of the southern part of the island. On 2 January 1942, the regiment left the Centauro division and became an autonomous unit. The regiment was transferred to Sicily, where the regimental command and CI Tank Battalion R35 were assigned to the XVI Army Corps, which was tasked with the defence of the southern part of the island, while the CII Tank Battalion R35 was assigned to the XII Army Corps, which was tasked with the defence of the western part of the island.

On 20 September 1942, the regimental command of the 32nd Tank Infantry Regiment arrived in Sardinia and the CC Tank Battalion SOMUA was assigned to the regiment. Meanwhile the two tank battalions in Sicily were split up and their companies assigned to mobile groups, which were motorized battle groups deployed near the beaches most likely to be used by the allies in a landing operation. Each mobile groups fielded a mix of infantry, tank, anti-tank, artillery, and anti-aircraft units. On 10 July 1943, allied forces landed on Sicily and on 21 July 1943, the companies of the CII Tank Battalion R35 were annihilated by the American 3rd Infantry Division to the north of Agrigento. The regimental command and remnants of the CI Tank Battalion R35 managed to retreat to Messina, from where they were evacuated on 12 August to Calabria.

On 1 September 1943, the regimental command and the survivors of the CI Tank Battalion R35 returned to the depot of the 31st Tank Infantry Regiment in Siena, where the regiment was to be rebuilt with the Tank Group "Leonessa", which was equipped with Panzer III Ausf. N, Panzer IV Ausf. G, and Sturmgeschütz III Ausf. G, and the XIX Tank Battalion M, which was equipped M15/42 tanks and Semovente da 75/34 self-propelled guns. Both units were part of the 136th Armored Legionary Division "Centauro" and the 131st Tank Infantry Regiment was planned to join the division once it had been rebuilt. However, in the evening of 8 September 1943, the Armistice of Cassibile, which ended hostilities between the Kingdom of Italy and the Anglo-American Allies, was announced by General Dwight D. Eisenhower on Radio Algiers and by Marshal Pietro Badoglio on Italian radio. Germany reacted by invading Italy and depot of the 31st Tank Infantry Regiment and the 131st Tank Infantry Regiment were disbanded soon thereafter by German forces.

Meanwhile, in Sardinia, the German forces located there retreated northward to Corsica after the announcement of the Armistice of Cassibile and the SOMUA S35 tanks of the CC Tank Battalion saw limited action against the retreating Germans. Afterwards the CC Tank Battalion was disbanded and the battalion's SOMUA S35 tanks transferred to the French Liberation Army.

=== Cold War ===
On 1 January 1953, the CI Tank Battalion was reformed as an autonomous tank battalion in Pinerolo. The battalion was equipped with M26 Pershing tanks and assigned to the III Army Corps. In July of the same year the battalion moved from Pinerolo to Vercelli. On 1 October 1956, the battalion was transferred to the IV Army Corps and moved from Vercelli to Verona. On 31 December 1963, the CI Tank Battalion was disbanded and its personnel and equipment used to reform the III Tank Battalion, which joined the reformed 32nd Tank Regiment on 1 July 1964.

During the 1975 army reform the army disbanded the regimental level and newly independent battalions were granted for the first time their own flags, respectively in the case of cavalry units, their own standard. On 20 October 1975, the 31st Tank Regiment was disbanded and the next day the regiment's II Tank Battalion in Bellinzago Novarese became an autonomous unit and was renamed 101st Tank Battalion "M.O. Zappalà". As part of the reform tank and armored battalions were named for officers, soldiers and partisans of the tank speciality, who had served in World War II and been awarded Italy's highest military honor the Gold Medal of Military Valor. The 101st Tank Battalion was named for Lieutenant Colonel Salvatore Zappalà, who, as commanding officer of LI Tank Battalion M14/41, 133rd Tank Infantry Regiment, was injured on 30 June 1942 near El Dabaa in Egypt during the Axis pursuit of the British Eighth Army to El Alamein after the Battle of Mersa Matruh. Zappalà, who had also been awarded four Silver Medals of Military Valor (2× during World War I, 1× during the Italian military intervention in the Spanish Civil War, and 1× during the invasion of Yugoslavia), three Bronze Medals of Military Valor (2× during World War I, and 1× during the Italian military intervention in the Spanish Civil War), and three War Crosses of Military Valor (1× during the Second Italo-Ethiopian War, 1× during the Italian military intervention in the Spanish Civil War, and 1× during the Greco–Italian War), succumbed to his injures two days later, on 2 July 1942, in the Italian field hospital at Sallum.

The 101st Tank Battalion "M.O. Zappalà" was assigned to the 31st Armored Brigade "Curtatone" and consisted of a command, a command and services company, and three tank companies with Leopard 1A2 main battle tanks. The battalion fielded now 434 men (32 officers, 82 non-commissioned officers, and 320 soldiers). On 12 November 1976 the President of the Italian Republic Giovanni Leone assigned with decree 846 the flag and traditions of the 131st Tank Infantry Regiment to the 101st Tank Battalion "M.O. Zappalà".

In 1986, the Italian Army abolished the divisional level and brigades, which until then had been under one of the Army's four divisions, came forthwith under direct command of the Army's 3rd Army Corps or 5th Army Corps. As the Armored Division "Centauro" carried a historically significant name, the division ceased to exist on 31 October in Novara, and the next day in the same location the 31st Armored Brigade "Centauro" was activated. The new brigade took command of the units of the 31st Armored Brigade "Curtatone", whose name was stricken from the roll of active units of the Italian Army.

=== Recent times ===
After the end of the Cold War Italian Army began to draw down its forces and, on 31 July 1993, the 101st Tank Battalion "M.O. Zappalà" was disbanded and its personnel merged into the 1st Tank Battalion "M.O. Cracco", which, on 31 August of the same year, lost its autonomy and the next day, on 1 September 1993, entered the reformed 31st Tank Regiment. On the same day, 31 August 1993, the 31st Tank Battalion "M.O. Andreani" in Persano lost its autonomy and the next day, on 1 September 1993, the battalion entered the reformed 131st Tank Regiment. The regiment was assigned to the 8th Bersaglieri Brigade "Garibaldi" and equipped with Leopard 1A2 main battle tanks. On 4 October 1993, the flag of the 31st Tank Battalion "M.O. Andreani" was transferred to the Shrine of the Flags in the Vittoriano in Rome and the battalion was renamed 101st Tank Battalion "M.O. Zappalà".

On 1 June 1999, the tankers specialty was transferred from the infantry arm to the cavalry arm. Consequently, on the same date the regiment replaced its flag with a cavalry standard. In 2003, the regiment replaced its Leopard 1A2 with Leopard 1A5 main battle tanks. In 2008, the Italian Army retired its last Leopard 1A5 and the regiment received Ariete main battle tanks. Between 12 October 2009 and 10 April 2010, the regiment deployed to Herat in Afghanistan as part of the NATO's International Security Assistance Force. After its return to Italy the regiment was awarded a Gold Cross of Army Merit for its conduct in Afghanistan. On 30 June 2013, the 4th Tank Regiment disbanded its companies in Bellinzago Novarese and the next day, on 1 July 2013, the standard of the 4th Tank Regiment arrived in Persano, where it replaced the standard of the 131st Tank Regiment. On the same date the regiment's 101st Tank Battalion "M.O. Zappalà" was renamed 20th Tank Battalion "M.O. Pentimalli". Afterwards the standard of the 131st Tank Regiment was transferred to the Shrine of the Flags in the Vittoriano in Rome for safekeeping.

== See also ==
- Bersaglieri Brigade "Garibaldi"
