= 4th Tank Regiment (Italy) =

Active Italian Army tank unit

- 4° Reggimento Carri
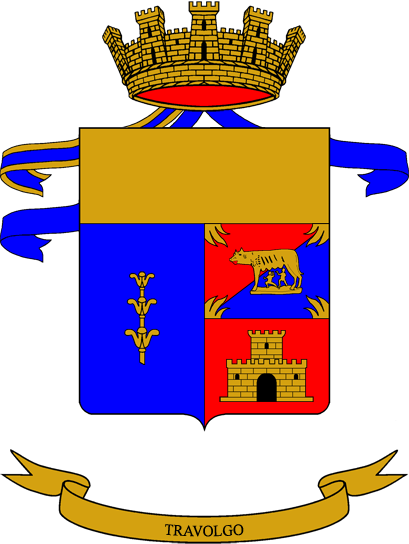
- Regimental coat of arms
- Active: 15 Sept. 1936 — 25 Jan. 1941; 15 March 1941 — 10 Sept. 1943; 1 Jan. 1953 — 30 Jan. 1991; 18 Sept. 1992 — today
- Country: Italy
- Branch: Italian Army
- Part of: Bersaglieri Brigade "Garibaldi"
- Garrison/HQ: Persano
- Motto: "Travolgo"
- Anniversaries: 21 January 1941
- Decorations: 1x Gold Medal of Military Valor; 2x Bronze Medals of Military Valor

Insignia
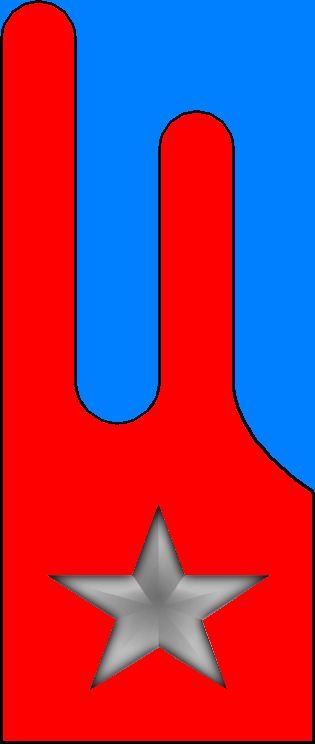
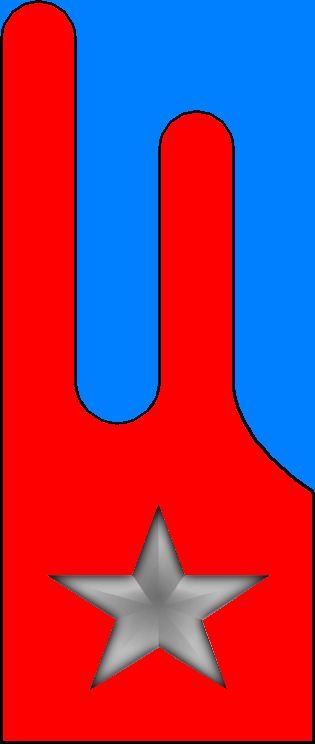
- Tank units gorget patches

The 4th Tank Regiment (Italian: 4° Reggimento Carri) is a tank regiment of the Italian Army based in Persano in Campania. The regiment is equipped with Ariete C1 main battle tanks and assigned to the Bersaglieri Brigade "Garibaldi". In 1936, the Royal Italian Army formed the regiment as a training and administrative unit. During World War II the regiment's command was sent to Libya, where it fought in the Western Desert campaign. The regiment's command, and the tank battalions assigned to it, were destroyed during the British Operation Compass. For its conduct in North Africa the regiment was awarded Italy's highest military honor the Gold Medal of Military Valor. In March 1941, the regiment was reformed, but it remained in Rome for the rest of the war as a training command. The regiment was disbanded by German forces after the Armistice of Cassibile was announced on 8 September 1943.

In 1953, the regiment was reformed and assigned to the Armored Division "Pozzuolo del Friuli". In 1958, the regiment was transferred to the Infantry Division "Legnano". In 1975, the regiment was disbanded and its flag and traditions were assigned to the 20th Tank Battalion "M.O. Pentimalli", which had become an autonomous unit on 30 October 1975. In 1991, the battalion was disbanded. In 1992, the regiment was reformed in Ozzano dell'Emilia and incorporated the 11th Tank Battalion "M.O. Calzecchi". One year later the regiment swapped name and flags with the 33rd Tank Regiment, which was based Civitavecchia. In 1995, the regiment transferred its flag to Bellinzago Novarese, where it replaced the flag of the 31st Tank Regiment, which moved to Altamura. Originally the unit, like all Italian tank units, was part of the army's infantry arm, but on 1 June 1999 the tankers specialty was transferred from the infantry arm to the cavalry arm. Consequently, on the same date the regiment replaced its flag with a cavalry standard. In 2013, the regiment transferred its standard to Persano, where it replaced the standard of the 131st Tank Regiment.

The regiment's anniversary falls on 21 January 1941, the day British forces captured Tobruk and the 4th Tank Infantry Regiment fought until its annihilation, for which the regiment was awarded Italy's highest military honor the Gold Medal of Military Valor.

== History ==
=== Interwar years ===
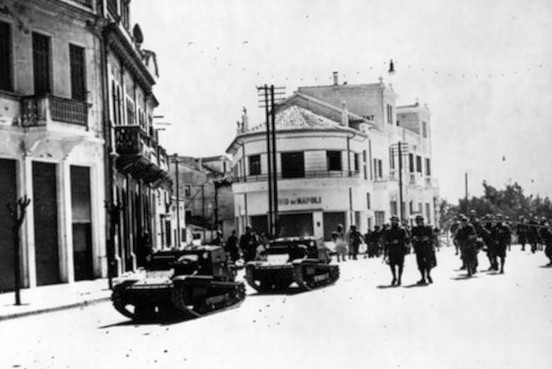
Italian troops and L3/35 tankettes from the 4th Tank Infantry Regiment in Durrës, Albania on 7 April 1939

On 1 October 1927, the Royal Italian Army reorganized its Armed Tanks Formation Center in Rome and formed the Armed Tanks Regiment (Italian: Reggimento carri armati) as central training unit for the army's tank battalions. In 1931, the regimental headquarter moved from Rome to Bologna. On 15 September 1936, the Armed Tanks Regiment was split into four tank infantry regiments, which had training and administrative functions:

- 1st Tank Infantry Regiment, in Vercelli
- 2nd Tank Infantry Regiment, in Verona
- 3rd Tank Infantry Regiment, in Bologna
- 4th Tank Infantry Regiment, in Rome

The 4th Tank Infantry Regiment received six battalions from the disbanded regiment and formed a depot, which included training and maintenance units. The six battalions, like all tank battalions at the time, were named for infantry officers, who had served in World War I and been awarded posthumously Italy's highest military honor the Gold Medal of Military Valor. The regiment consisted of the following units after its founding:

- 4th Tank Infantry Regiment, in Rome
  - II Breach Tanks Battalion "Alessi", in Rome
  - V Breach Tanks Battalion "Suarez", in Rome
  - VIII Assault Tanks Battalion "Bettoja", in Rome
  - IX Assault Tanks Battalion "Guadagni", in Bari
  - X Assault Tanks Battalion "Menzinger", in Agnano
  - XII Assault Tanks Battalion "Cangialosi", in Palermo
  - 4th Training Center, in Rome
  - 4th Maintenance Workshop, in Rome

The assault tanks battalions fielded L3/33 tankettes, which were soon replaced by slightly improved L3/35 tankettes, while the breach tanks battalion fielded Fiat 3000 light tanks. On 15 July 1937, the II Breach Tanks Battalion "Alessi" was transferred to the newly formed 31st Tank Infantry Regiment. On 5 June 1937, the regiment formed a new XX Assault Tanks Battalion, as the XX Assault Tanks Battalion "Randaccio" had been disbanded after it returned from fighting in the Second Italo-Ethiopian War, and, on 1 October of the same year, the regiment formed a new XXI Assault Tanks Battalion, as the XXI Assault Tanks Battalion "Trombi" had been disbanded after it returned from Libya. The two new tank battalions were sent to Libya, where they were assigned to the XX Army Corps, respectively the XXI Army Corps.

In 1938, all Assault Tank Battalions were renamed Tank Battalion L (with L standing for Italian: "Leggero" or Light), while Breach Tanks Battalions were renamed Tank Battalion M (with M standing for Italian: "Medio" or Medium). On 30 November 1938, the 4th Tank Infantry Regiment transferred its V Tank Battalion M to the 2nd Tank Infantry Regiment, which the next day was reorganized as 32nd Tank Infantry Regiment and then joined the II Armored Brigade. On the same date, 30 November 1938, the 3rd Tank Infantry Regiment transferred the Tank Company L Sardinia to the 4th Tank Infantry Regiment.

On 7 April 1939, the VIII Tank Battalion L and X Tank Battalion L participated in the Italian invasion of Albania. The two battalions were assigned to the landing force, which went ashore in Durrës and occupied the city after the Battle of Durrës. Both battalions remained in Albania and, on 20 May 1939, joined the 31st Tank Infantry Regiment, which had moved from Siena to Tirana in Albania. On the same date, the 31st Tank Infantry Regiment ceded its CCCXI Tank Battalion M in Siena and CCCXII Tank Battalion M in Massa to the 4th Tank Infantry Regiment. During 1939, the IX Tank Battalion L moved to Libya, where it joined the XXII Army Corps and the Tank Company L Sardinia was expanded to Tank Battalion Sardinia.

=== World War II ===
In early 1940 the regiment consisted of the following units:

- 4th Tank Infantry Regiment, in Rome
  - XII Tank Battalion L, in Palermo
  - CCCXI Tank Battalion M, in Siena
  - CCCXII Tank Battalion M, in Massa
  - Tank Battalion Sardinia, in Cagliari
  - 4th Training Center, in Rome
  - 4th Maintenance Workshop, in Rome

On 30 March 1940, the CCCXII Tank Battalion M was assigned to the Aegean Troops in Rhodes, the main island of the Italian Islands of the Aegean. The battalion arrived in Rhodes in September of the same year and was attached to the 50th Infantry Division "Regina". On 1 April 1940, the CCCXI Tank Battalion M was disbanded and its personnel used to form a new VIII Tank Battalion L. During 1940, the Tank Battalion Sardinia was renamed XIII Tank Battalion L.

==== Western Desert campaign ====
On 11 June 1940, the day after Italy's entry into World War II, the regiment's command and the regiment's command company were sent to Libya, where the regiment received the I Tank Battalion M11/39 and II Tank Battalion M11/39 from the 32nd Tank Infantry Regiment. The two battalions had been formed by the depot of the 32nd Tank Infantry Regiment with the personnel of the disbanded III and IV breach tanks battalions. In July 1940, the regiment received the LXIII Tank Battalion L from the 63rd Infantry Division "Cirene". On 5 August 1940, the regiment's tanks clashed with British units for the first time near Sidi Azeiz.

On 29 August 1940, the tank battalions in Libya were used to form the Babini Group, which consisted of three formations:

- Libyan Tank Command, General Valentino Babini
  - I Tank Grouping (Aresca Group), Colonel Pietro Aresca, Commanding Officer of the 4th Tank Infantry Regiment
    - I Tank Battalion M11/39
    - XXI Tank Battalion L
    - LXII Tank Battalion L
    - LXIII Tank Battalion L
  - II Tank Grouping (Trivioli Group), Colonel Antonio Trivioli
    - II Tank Battalion M11/39 (1× company detached)
    - IX Tank Battalion L
    - XX Tank Battalion L
    - LXI Tank Battalion L
  - Mixed Tank Battalion
    - 1× Tank Company M, with M11/39 tanks (from the II Tank Battalion M11/39)
    - 1x Tank Company L, with L3/35 tankettes (from the LX Tank Battalion L)
  - LX Tank Battalion L (1× company detached)

On 9 September 1940, the I Tank Grouping participated in the Italian invasion of Egypt, which initiated the Western Desert campaign. The Italian forces stopped after one week at Sidi Barrani in Egypt and dug in. On 9 December 1940, the British Eighth Army commenced Operation Compass and the Italian tank units, which were deployed piecemeal, were easily defeated by the more numerous and more powerful British tank formations. The first two battalions to be annihilated were the II Tank Battalion M11/39 during an early morning surprise Attack on Nibeiwa and the IX Tank Battalion L in the early afternoon of the same day as prelude to the Battle of Sidi Barrani.

With the Italian forces retreating from Sidi Barrani to Bardia the tanks of the I Tank Battalion M11/39 were sent forward to Sollum and the Halfaya Pass to delay the British advance. By 15 December 1940, both locations were in British hands and the remnants of the I Tank Battalion M11/39 retreated to Tobruk, while the LX Tank Battalion L was destroyed at Buq Buq. The III Tank Battalion M13/40, which was equipped with improved M13/40 tanks, withdrew to Mechili, while the XXI Tank Battalion L left its tankettes at Tobruk and moved to Benghazi to mount on M13/40 tanks that had arrived along with the V Tank Battalion M13/40 and the V Tank Battalion L with L3/35 tankettes.

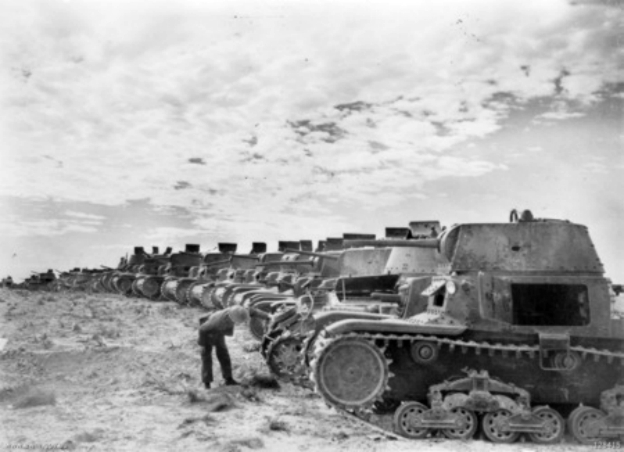
Italian tanks captured in the Battle of Beda Fomm

Between 3 and 5 January 1941, the V, XX, LXI, and LXII tank battalions L were destroyed in the Battle of Bardia. On 7 January 1941, the regimental command of the 4th Tank Infantry Regiment with the remnants of the I Tank Battalion M11/39 and the LXIII Tank Battalion L were surrounded with other Italian forces at Tobruk. On 20 January, during the British capture of Tobruk the position of the 4th Tank Infantry Regiment was overrun by the 19th Australian Brigade with such ferocity that 70% of the remaining officers, including both battalion commanders, and 50% of the remaining troops of the regiment were killed in action. On 13 January, the VI Tank Battalion M13/40 arrived from Italy and joined the rest of the Babini Group, which now consisted of the V and XXI tank battalions M13/40. On 24 January the Babini Group clashed inconclusively with the British 7th Armoured Division at Mechili. After Mechili the remnants of the Italian 10th Army retreated further west to Beda Fomm, where the British Combeforce successfully cut the Italian line of retreat and destroyed on 6–7 February 1941 the remnants of the Italian 10th Army, which included what was left of the III, V, VI, and XXI tank battalions M13/40, in the Battle of Beda Fomm.

Between 10 June 1940 and 21 January 1941, the 4th Tank Infantry Regiment and the III and V tank battalions' casualties were: 15 officers killed and 14 wounded out of 34, and 148 soldiers killed and 244 wounded out of 538. On 25 January 1941, the 4th Tank Infantry Regiment was declared lost due to war time events. For its conduct between 8 July 1940 and 21 January 1941 in Bardia, Sollum, at Halfaya Pass, and in Sidi Barrani, and its sacrifice at Tobruk the 4th Tank Infantry Regiment was awarded Italy's highest military honor the Gold Medal of Military Valor, which was affixed to the regiment's flag. For their service and sacrifice during Operation Compass, the XX and XXI tank battalions L, which had been formed by the 4th Tank Infantry Regiment's depot in 1937, were each awarded a Bronze Medal of Military Valor, which were affixed to the flag of the 4th Tank Infantry Regiment.

==== Italy ====
On 30 December 1940, Germany had offered Italy to 360 R35 light tanks, which German forces had captured in France. On 15 January 1941, the Germans increased their offer to 140 R35 for immediate delivery, 360 R35 to be delivered later, 50 SOMUA S35 cavalry tanks, and 103 Char B1 heavy tanks. On 15 March 1941, the 4th Tank Infantry Regiment's command was reformed in Rome by reorganizing the command of the regiment's depot. In expectation of the arrival of the R35 light tanks the regiment split its two recruits battalions into six tank battalions and by 15 April 1941 the regiment consisted of the following units:

- 4th Tank Infantry Regiment, in Rome
  - I Tank Battalion R35 (formed with the recruits of the 1st Recruits Company, I Recruits Battalion)
  - II Tank Battalion R35 (formed with the recruits of the 2nd Recruits Company, I Recruits Battalion)
  - III Tank Battalion R35 (formed with the recruits of the 3rd Recruits Company, I Recruits Battalion)
  - IV Tank Battalion R35 (formed with the recruits of the 4th Recruits Company, I Recruits Battalion)
  - V Tank Battalion R35 (formed with the recruits of the 7th and 8th recruits companies, II Recruits Battalion)
  - VI Tank Battalion R35 (formed with the recruits of the 5th and 6th recruits companies, II Recruits Battalion)
  - VIII Tank Battalion L
  - 4th Training Center, in Rome
  - 4th Maintenance Workshop, in Rome

On 24 April 1941, the first train with R35 light tanks arrived in Italy. On 30 April 1941, the VIII Tank Battalion L was disbanded and its personnel used to form the XI Tank Battalion M13/40. On 17 May 1941, the command of the 4th Tank Infantry Regiment was again on its way to Libya and embarked in Naples on the troop ship SS Conte Rosso, which was torpedoed and sunk on 24 May off Capo Murro di Porco by the Royal Navy submarine HMS Upholder and most of the regiment's command drowned. In May 1941, the Germans reduced their offer of available tanks to 124 R35 and 32 SOMUA S35. Consequently on 15 June 1941, the I and II tank battalions R35 were renamed CI Tank Battalion R35 and CII Tank Battalion R35, while the III Tank Battalion R35 was reorganized as III Recruits Battalion. At the same time the IV and V tank battalions R35 were merged to form the CC Tank Battalion SOMUA, while the personnel of the VI Tank Battalion R35 was used to reform the VIII Tank Battalion L. Also on 15 June 1941, the regiment's depot formed the command and the command company of the 132nd Tank Infantry Regiment, which was immediately transferred to Libya, where it joined to the 132nd Armored Division "Ariete". Late in June 1941, the XI Tank Battalion M13/40 was transferred to Libya as reinforcement for the 132nd Tank Infantry Regiment. On 27 July 1941, the CI and CII tank battalions R35, and the CC Tank Battalion SOMUA were transferred to the newly formed 131st Tank Infantry Regiment.

In summer 1941, the command of the 4th Tank Infantry Regiment was reformed for a second time. In December 1941, the regiment's depot formed the II Tank Battalion Lf (with Lf standing for Italian: "Lanciafiamme" or Flamethrower), with two companies, which were soon joined by a third company, which had been raised by the 1st Tank Infantry Regiment. On 1 February 1942, the personnel of the VIII Tank Battalion L was used to form the XVII Tank Battalion M13/40, which was assigned in August of the same year to the 31st Tank Infantry Regiment. On 15 March 1942, the depot formed the 50th Auto Group, which on 15 October 1942 was merged into the newly formed M Tanks and Special Vehicles Training Battalion. On the same date, 15 October 1942, the regiment transferred its anti-aircraft company with 20/65 mod. 35 anti-aircraft guns to the 33rd Tank Infantry Regiment.

On 1 September 1943, the regiment's depot began with the formation of the II Tank Battalion P26/40 (with P standing for Italian: "Pesante" or Heavy), which was to receive new P26/40 tanks. In the evening of 8 September 1943, the Armistice of Cassibile, which ended hostilities between the Kingdom of Italy and the Anglo-American Allies, was announced by General Dwight D. Eisenhower on Radio Algiers and by Marshal Pietro Badoglio on Italian radio. Two days later, on 10 September, Second Lieutenant Vincenzo Fioritto led a force of eleven tanks of the 4th Tank Infantry Regiment's depot to support the grenadiers of the 1st Regiment "Granatieri di Sardegna", the lancers of the Regiment "Lancieri di Montebello", remnants of the 12th Infantry Division "Sassari" and hundreds of civilians in the defense of Porta San Paolo against attacking German forces. By 17:00h in the afternoon of that day, the German 2nd Parachute Division had taken Porta San Paolo and Fioritto charged with his tanks in an attempt to stop the Germans from entering Rome. During the attack Fioritto was killed in action - one of the 570 Italian casualties of the day. For this conduct and service Vincenzo Fioritto was awarded Italy's highest military honor the Gold Medal of Military Valor and in 1975 the LXIII Tank Battalion was named 63rd Tank Battalion "M.O. Fioritto" in his memory. After taking Rome the Germans disbanded the 4th Tank Infantry Regiment and the regiment's depot.

=== Cold War ===
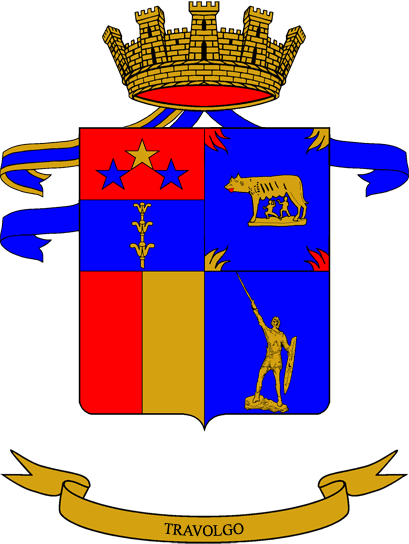
Coat of arms of the 20th Tank Battalion "M.O. Pentimalli"

On 1 January 1953, the Italian Army reformed the regiment in Rome as 4th Tankers Regiment. The reformed regiment was assigned to the Armored Division "Pozzuolo del Friuli", which had been formed on the same date. On 1 February 1953, the regiment formed the I and II tank battalions, and on 15 February the III Tank Battalion. The three battalions were equipped with M26 Pershing tanks. In 1955, the regiment moved from Rome to Civitavecchia. In 1958, the Italian Army disbanded the Armored Division "Pozzuolo del Friuli". Consequently the 1st Bersaglieri Regiment moved from Viterbo to Civitavecchia, where it transferred on 1 May 1958 its IX Bersaglieri Battalion to the 4th Tankers Regiment, which in turn transferred on the same date its I and III tank battalions to the 1st Bersaglieri Regiment. Afterwards the 4th Tankers Regiment was renamed 4th Armored Infantry Regiment and moved from Civitavecchia to Legnano, where it joined the Infantry Division "Legnano". On 24 May 1961, the IX Bersaglieri Battalion was renamed II Bersaglieri Battalion. The regiment consisted now of the following units:

- 4th Armored Infantry Regiment, in Legnano
  - Command Company
  - II Bersaglieri Battalion
  - XX Tank Battalion (former II Tank Battalion, 4th Tankers Regiment)

During the 1975 army reform the army disbanded the regimental level and newly independent battalions were granted for the first time their own flags, respectively in the case of cavalry units, their own standard. On 29 October 1975, the 4th Armored Infantry Regiment was disbanded and the next day the regiment's XX Tank Battalion in Legnano became an autonomous unit and was renamed 20th Tank Battalion "M.O. Pentimalli". As part of the reform tank and armored battalions were named for officers, soldiers and partisans of the tank speciality, who had served in World War II and been awarded Italy's highest military honor the Gold Medal of Military Valor. The 20th Tank Battalion was named for Second Lieutenant Livio Pentimalli, who, while serving as commander of III Platoon, 1st Company, XI Tank Battalion M13/40, had distinguished himself on 26 May 1942 during the Battle of Gazala and been killed in action on 21 June 1942 during the Axis capture of Tobruk.

On the same date, 30 October 1975, the regiment's II Bersaglieri Battalion became an autonomous unit and was renamed 2nd Bersaglieri Battalion "Governolo". The two battalions were then assigned to the Mechanized Brigade "Legnano", which had been formed on the same day by splitting the Infantry Division "Legnano" into the Mechanized Brigade "Brescia" and Mechanized Brigade "Legnano". The 20th Tank Battalion "M.O. Pentimalli" consisted of a command, a command and services company, and three tank companies with Leopard 1A2 main battle tanks. The battalion fielded now 434 men (32 officers, 82 non-commissioned officers, and 320 soldiers). On 12 November 1976, the President of the Italian Republic Giovanni Leone assigned with decree 846 the flag and traditions of the 4th Armored Infantry Regiment to the 20th Tank Battalion "M.O. Pentimalli".

=== Recent times ===
After the end of the Cold War Italian Army began to draw down its forces and on 30 January 1991, the 20th Tank Battalion "M.O. Pentimalli" was disbanded and the flag of the 4th Armored Infantry Regiment transferred to the Shrine of the Flags in the Vittoriano in Rome for safekeeping. However, as the 4th Tank Regiment was the Italian Army's highest and most decorated tank unit, the army decided to reform the regiment. On 18 September 1992, the 11th Tank Regiment "M.O. Calzecchi" in Ozzano dell'Emilia was redesignated as 4th Tank Regiment, and three days later, on 21 September 1992, the flag of the 11th Tank Regiment "M.O. Calzecchi" was transferred to the Shrine of the Flags in the Vittoriano. The 4th Tank Regiment was now assigned to the Mechanized Brigade "Friuli".

On 31 August 1993, the 6th Tank Battalion "M.O. Scapuzzi" in Civitavecchia lost its autonomy and transferred the flag of the 33rd Tank Regiment, which had been assigned to the battalion in 1976, to Ozzano dell'Emilia, while on the same day the flag of the 4th Tank Regiment was transferred from Ozzano dell'Emilia to Civitavecchia. The next day, on 1 September 1993, the 11th Tank Battalion "M.O. Calzecchi" in Ozzano dell'Emilia entered the reformed 33rd Tank Regiment, while the 6th Tank Battalion "M.O. Scapuzzi" entered the 4th Tank Regiment, which on the same date was assigned to the Mechanized Brigade "Granatieri di Sardegna".

On 8 October 1995, the 4th Tank Regiment disbanded its companies in Civitavecchia and the next day, on 9 October 1995, the flag of the 4th Tank Regiment arrived in Bellinzago Novarese, where it replaced the flag of the 31st Tank Regiment. The 4th Tank Regiment was now assigned to the Armored Brigade "Centauro". In 1996, the 4th Tank Regiment's battalion was redesignated 20th Tank Battalion "M.O. Pentimalli". On 1 June 1999, the tankers specialty was transferred from the infantry arm to the cavalry arm. Consequently, on the same date the regiment replaced its flag with a cavalry standard. On 5 October 2002, the Armored Brigade "Centauro" was disbanded and the 4th Tank Regiment was assigned to the 132nd Armored Brigade "Ariete".

On 30 June 2013, the 4th Tank Regiment disbanded its companies in Bellinzago Novarese and the next day, on 1 July 2013, the standard of the 4th Tank Regiment arrived in Persano, where it replaced the standard of the 131st Tank Regiment. Afterwards the standard of the 131st Tank Regiment was transferred to the Shrine of the Flags in the Vittoriano for safekeeping.

== Organization ==
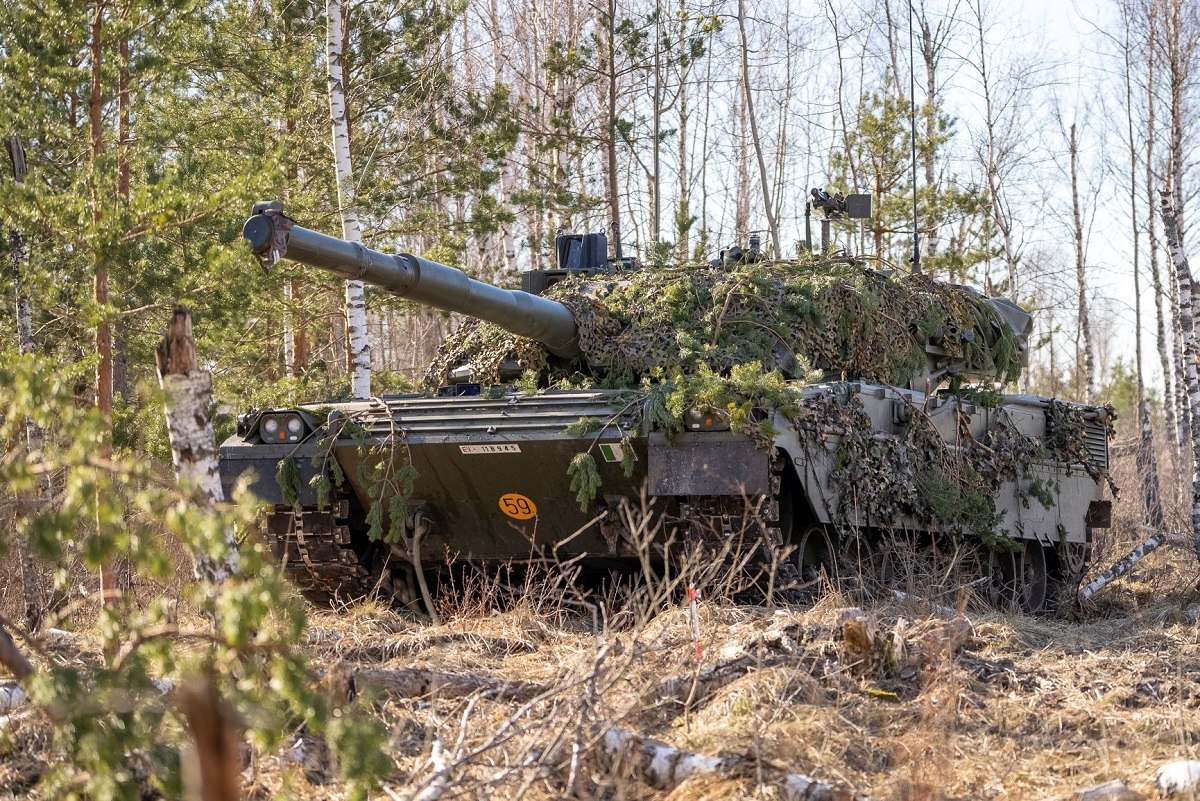
4th Tank Regiment Ariete tank during a training exercise in Latvia in March 2024

As of 2025 the 4th Tank Regiment is organized as follows:

- 4th Tank Regiment, in Persano
  - Command and Logistic Support Company
  - 20th Tank Battalion "M.O. Pentimalli"
    - 1st Tank Company
    - 2nd Tank Company
    - 3rd Tank Company
    - 4th Tank Company (Suspended due to a lack of tanks)

The regiment is equipped with Ariete C1 main battle tanks, which are being replaced by Ariete C2 main battle tanks.

== See also ==
- Bersaglieri Brigade "Garibaldi"
