= Mechanized Brigade "Trieste" =

Brigata Meccanizzata "Trieste"
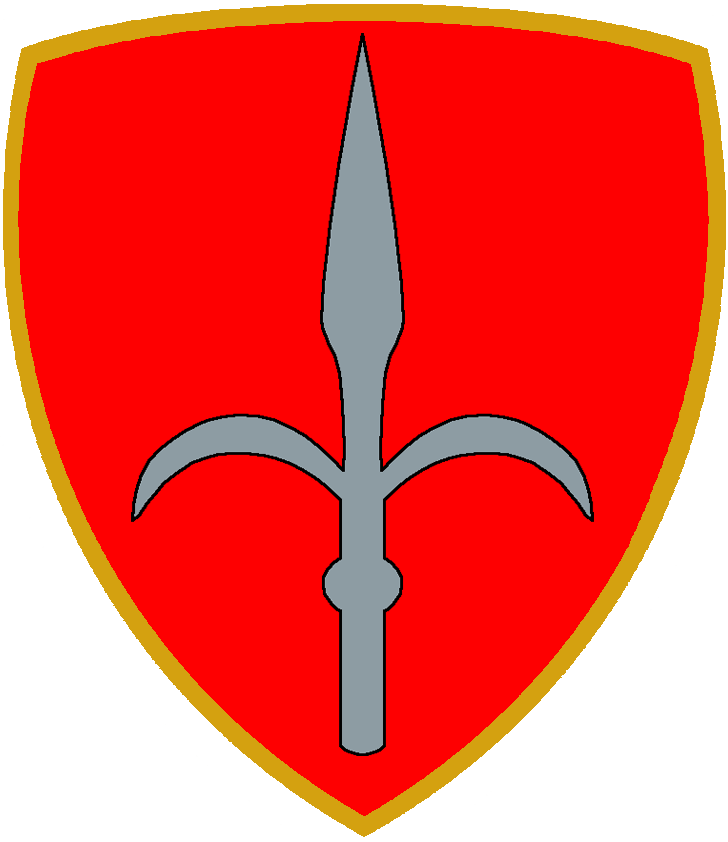
- Coat of Arms of the Mechanized Brigade "Trieste" after 1986
- Active: 20 October 1960 – 31 May 1991
- Country: Italy
- Branch: Italian Army
- Type: Infantry
- Role: Armoured warfare
- Part of: 1975 - 1986 Mechanized Division "Folgore"; 1986 - 1991 3rd Army Corps
- Garrison/HQ: Bologna

The Mechanized Brigade "Trieste" was a mechanized brigade of the Italian Army. Its core units were mechanized infantry battalions. The brigade's headquarter was in the city of Bologna. Named after the North-Eastern city of Trieste the brigade's coat of arms was modeled after the city's coat of arms.

== History ==
=== Constitution ===
The "Trieste" brigade's history began in August 1862 when the Infantry Brigade "Valtellina" was raised. The brigade consisted of the 65th Infantry Regiment "Valtellina" and the 66th Infantry Regiment "Valtellina". The brigade along with the Infantry Brigade "Brescia" formed the 5th Division of the Line in the Third Italian War of Independence, where it fought in the Battle of Custoza. Personnel from the brigade were dispatched to fight in the Italian colonial wars in Eritrea in 1887, Abyssinia in 1895 and Libya in 1911.

=== World War I ===
During World War I the brigade fought on the Italian Front as part of the 7th Division of the Line, which was part of the IV Army Corps. In spring 1915 the brigade moved to the Austrian border and saw its first combat during the First Battle of the Isonzo. By war's end the brigade had reached the city of Trento.

=== World War II ===
In 1926 the Italian army decided to change the structure of its divisions: instead of two brigades with two infantry regiments each the new divisions would consist of one brigade with three infantry regiments. Therefore, the "Valtellina" brigade was disbanded and the 65th Infantry Regiment transferred to VIII Infantry Brigade of the 8th Infantry Division "Po", while the 66th Infantry Regiment was transferred to XVI Infantry Brigade of the 16th Infantry Division "Fossalta".

On 6 May 1937 the two regiments were reunited in the 8th Infantry Division "Po", which was subsequently equipped as a motorized division. The division also fielded the 21st Artillery Regiment and in 1938 added the 9th Bersaglieri Regiment, making it one of the few Italian divisions with three infantry regiments instead of the standard two infantry regiments. On 4 April 1939 the units was renamed as 101st Motorized Division "Trieste". At the outbreak of World War II the division was one of the few fully motorized divisions of the army.

In fall of 1940 the division command and 21st Artillery Regiment were sent to Albania to reinforce the Italian units in the Greco-Italian War. After German forces had conquered Greece in the Battle of Greece the division command and 21st Artillery Regiment returned to Italy. In August 1941 the division was sent to Libya where it and the 132nd Armored Division "Ariete" formed the XX Motorized Corps. The Trieste immediately entered the frontline in the Siege of Tobruk. From Tobruk onward the division participated in all Western Desert Campaign battles: Operation Crusader, Battle of Gazala, Battle of Bir Hakeim, First Battle of El Alamein. During the Second Battle of El Alamein the Trieste was annihilated and its remnants, reinforced with men and materiel from Italy, fought against the British Eighth Army in Tunisia until the Axis surrender to the Allies on 13 May 1943.

=== Cold War ===
On 1 June 1950 the division was raised again as Infantry Division "Trieste" in the city of Bologna. The division was the only major unit under the VI Military Territorial Command and consisted of the 40th Infantry Regiment "Bologna", 82nd Infantry Regiment "Torino" and the 21st Field Artillery Regiment. In 1951 the division was augmented with the 6th Armored Cavalry Regiment "Lancieri di Aosta" and the 121st Field Artillery Regiment.

However, on 15 October 1954 the division was split in two formations: the Grouping "Trieste", which consisted of the 82nd Infantry Regiment "Torino" and the I Group of the 21st Field Artillery Regiment, and the Grouping "Bologna", which included the 40th Infantry Regiment "Bologna" and the 21st Field Artillery Regiment. The 6th Armored Cavalry Regiment "Lancieri di Aosta" was transferred to the VI Military Territorial Command. The 121st Artillery Regiment had already left the division on 5 June 1953 when the regiment became the 121st Heavy Anti-aircraft Artillery Regiment. The Grouping "Trieste" moved from Bologna to the city of Trieste, when that city returned to Italian control on 26 October 1954. On 23 October 1954 the Infantry Division "Trieste" was disbanded.

In 1955 the army decided to assign the defence of Trieste to the Infantry Division "Folgore". Therefore, the Grouping "Trieste" was disbanded on 15 September 1955 and its units passed to the Folgore, while on the same day the Grouping "Bologna" was elevated to division and renamed Infantry Division "Trieste. In September 1956 the Trieste and the Infantry Division "Friuli" entered the newly raised VI Army Corps in Bologna.

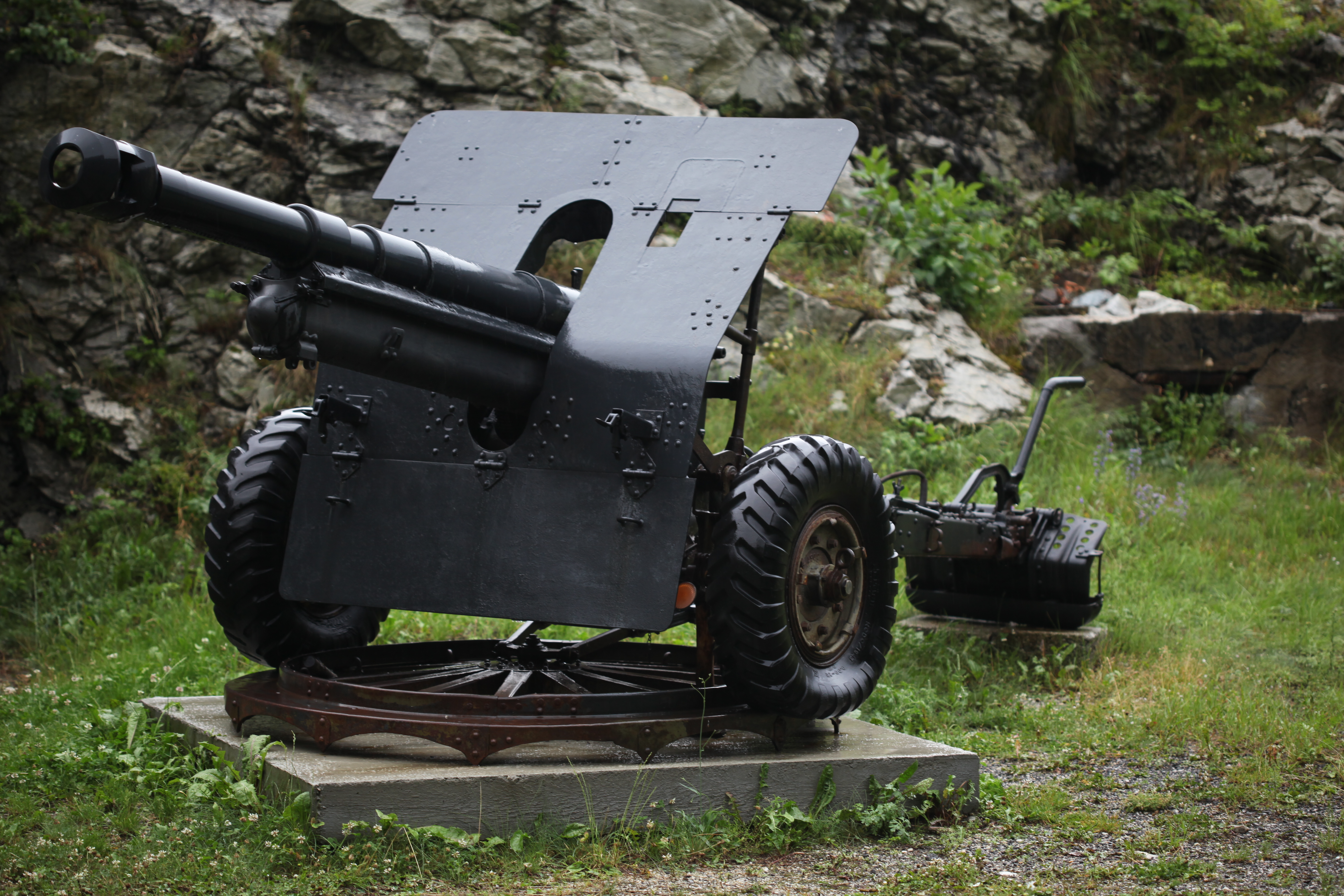
A 105/22 mod. 14/61 105mm towed howitzer as used by the 'Field Artillery Group "Trieste"

On 30 May 1960 the division received the XI Armored Battalion and on 20 October of the same year the division was reduced to Infantry Brigade "Trieste". The brigade was headquartered in Bologna and most of its units stationed in the surrounding region of Emilia-Romagna. By 1964 the structure of the brigade was:

- Infantry Brigade "Trieste", in Bologna
  - 40th Infantry Regiment "Bologna", in Bologna
    - Command and Services Company, in Bologna
    - I Infantry Battalion, in Bologna
    - II Infantry Battalion, in Forlì
    - III Infantry Battalion, in Bologna
    - Regimental Anti-tank Company, in Bologna (anti-tank guided missiles and M47 tanks)
  - XI Armored Battalion, in Ozzano dell'Emilia (M47 Patton tanks and M113 armored personnel carriers)
  - Field Artillery Group "Trieste", in Bologna (M14/61 105 mm towed howitzers)
  - Light Aviation Unit "Trieste", at Bologna Air Base (L-21B Super Cub)
  - Engineer Company "Trieste", in Bologna
  - Signal Company "Trieste", in Bologna
  - Resupply, Repairs, Recovery Unit "Trieste", in Budrio
  - Transport Unit "Trieste", in Budrio

In 1972 the VI Army Corps was disbanded and the brigade along with the "Friuli| brigade were transferred to the Tuscan-Emilian Military Region. During the 1975 army reform the regimental level was abolished and brigades took direct command of battalions, more units were mechanized and higher commands realigned to better defend Italy against a potential Warsaw Pact attack. Therefore, on 1 August 1975 the Trieste entered the Mechanized Division "Folgore" and changed its name to Mechanized Brigade "Trieste". The 40th Infantry Regiment was disbanded and each of its three battalions became a newly independent battalion under direct control of the brigade. The brigades new composition was:

- Mechanized Brigade "Trieste", in Bologna
  - Command and Signal Unit "Trieste", in Bologna
  - 37th Mechanized Infantry Battalion "Ravenna", in Bologna
  - 40th Mechanized Infantry Battalion "Bologna", in Bologna
  - 66th Mechanized Infantry Battalion "Valtellina", in Forlì
  - 11th Tank Battalion "M.O. Calzecchi", in Ozzano dell'Emilia (Leopard 1A2 main battle tanks)
  - 21st Field Artillery Group "Romagna", in Bologna (M114 155 mm towed howitzers)
  - Logistic Battalion "Trieste", in Budrio
  - Anti-tank Company "Trieste", in Bologna (BGM-71 TOW anti-tank guided missiles)
  - Engineer Company "Trieste", in Bologna

On 1 August 1986 the army abolished the divisional level and the Trieste passed to the 3rd Army Corps in Milan. After the end of the Cold War Italian Army began a drawdown of its forces and on 16 December 1989 the 40th Mechanized Infantry Battalion Bologna was disbanded, and in 1991 six brigades were disbanded and on 31 May 1991 the Trieste was disbanded and the next day the remaining units of the brigade joined the Motorized Brigade "Friuli", which was renamed Mechanized Brigade "Friuli" and moved its headquarter to the headquarter building of the Trieste brigade in Bologna. Before the merger the 37th Mechanized Infantry Battalion "Ravenna" had been disbanded on 28 February 1991 and its barracks in Bologna taken over on 1 March 1991 by the 10th Bersaglieri Battalion "Bezzecca" of the Mechanized Brigade "Goito".

== Today ==
In 1992 the Army decided to rename its battalions as regiments for historical reasons. When the 66th Mechanized Infantry Battalion "Valtellina" was elevated to 66th Infantry Regiment in 1992 the army decided to not retain the regiment's traditional name "Valtellina", but to give the regiment it the name of the dissolved brigade: thus the 66th Infantry Regiment "Trieste" became the custodian of the history, traditions and honours of the Valtellina" regiment, as well as the "Trieste" brigade and the "Trieste" division.
