= 1st Armored Regiment (Italy) =

Active Italian Army tank training unit

- 1° Reggimento Corazzato
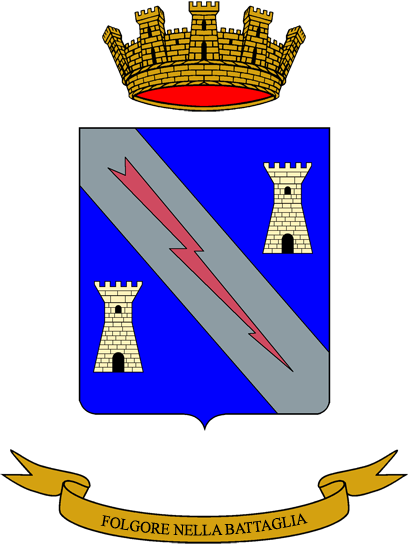
- Regimental coat of arms
- Active: 15 Sept. 1936 — 8 Feb. 1941; 15 March 1941 — 8 Sept. 1943; 10 July 1948 — 1 April 1949; 1 May 1974 — today
- Country: Italy
- Branch: Italian Army
- Part of: Army Military Command "Sardegna"
- Garrison/HQ: Teulada
- Motto(s): "Folgore nella battaglia"
- Anniversaries: 15 September 1936

Insignia
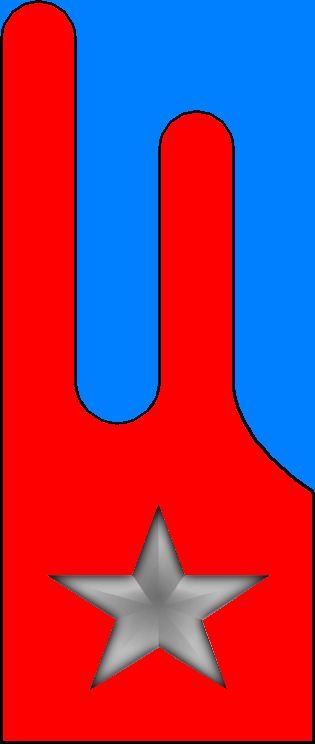
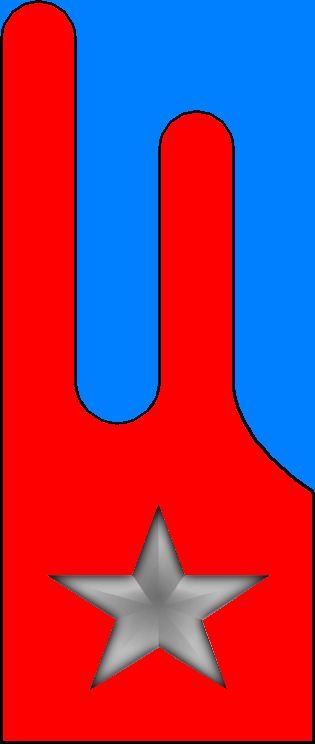
- Tank units gorget patches

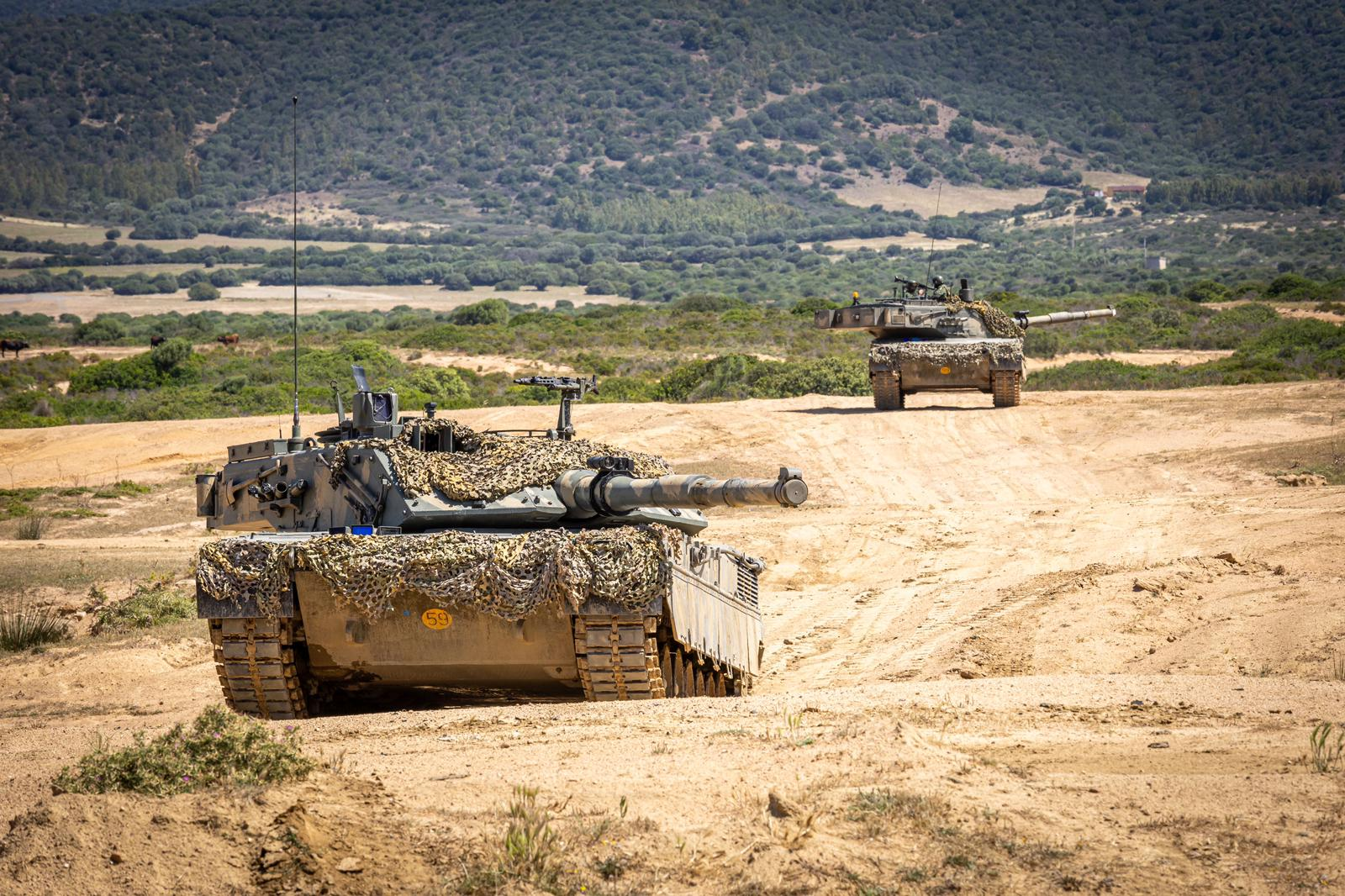
32nd Tank Regiment Ariete tanks during an exercise at Capo Teulada

The 1st Armored Regiment (Italian: 1° Reggimento Corazzato) is an armored warfare training regiment of the Italian Army based in Teulada in Sardinia. The regiment is assigned to the Army Military Command "Sardegna". The regiment was formed in 1936 as a training and administrative formation. During World War II the regiment fought in June 1940 in the Italian invasion of France. In summer 1940, the regimental command was sent to Libya, where it was tasked with administrative and logistical duties. On 6-7 February 1941, the regimental command was destroyed during the Battle of Beda Fomm. In March 1941, the regiment was reformed, but it remained in Vercelli for the rest of the war and was disbanded by German forces after the announcement of the Armistice of Cassibile on 8 September 1943.

The regiment was reformed in 1948, but already in 1949 it was disbanded its personnel and battalions used to reform the 132nd Tankers Regiment. In May 1974, the Armored Units Training Center in Teulada in Sardinia was renamed 1st Armored Infantry Regiment. Since then the regiment is tasked with managing the Capo Teulada Training Range and provide the opposing force for visiting units. Originally the unit, like all Italian tank units, was part of the army's infantry arm, but on 1 June 1999 the tankers specialty was transferred from the infantry arm to the cavalry arm. The regiment's anniversary falls, unique among all tank units, on 15 September 1936, the day the regiment was founded.

== History ==
=== Interwar years ===
On 1 October 1927, the Royal Italian Army reorganized its Armed Tanks Formation Center in Rome and formed the Armed Tanks Regiment (Italian: Reggimento carri armati) as central training unit for the army's tank battalions. In 1931, the regimental headquarter moved from Rome to Bologna. On 15 September 1936, the Armed Tanks Regiment was split into four tank infantry regiments, which had training and administrative functions:

- 1st Tank Infantry Regiment, in Vercelli
- 2nd Tank Infantry Regiment, in Verona
- 3rd Tank Infantry Regiment, in Bologna
- 4th Tank Infantry Regiment, in Rome

The 1st Tank Infantry Regiment received four battalions from the disbanded Armed Tanks Regiment and formed a depot, which included training and maintenance units. The four battalions, like all tank battalions at the time, were named for infantry officers, who had served in World War I and been awarded posthumously Italy's highest military honor the Gold Medal of Military Valor. The regiment consisted of the following units after its founding.:

- 1st Tank Infantry Regiment, in Vercelli
  - I Assault Tanks Battalion "Ribet", in Turin
  - II Assault Tanks Battalion "Berardi", in Alessandria
  - III Assault Tanks Battalion "Paselli", in Monza
  - IV Breach Tanks Battalion "Prestinari", in Vercelli
  - 1st Training Center, in Vercelli
  - 1st Maintenance Workshop, in Vercelli

The assault tanks battalions fielded initially L3/33 tankettes, which were soon replaced by slightly improved L3/35 tankettes, while the breach tanks battalion fielded Fiat 3000 light tanks. On 1 January 1938, the regiment received the XXIII Assault Tanks Battalion "Stennio", which had returned from Libya and took up residence in Fidenza. In 1938, all Assault Tanks Battalions were renamed Tank Battalion L (with L standing for Italian: "Leggero" or Light), while Breach Tanks Battalions were renamed Tank Battalion M (with M standing for Italian: "Medio" or Medium). On 1 December 1938, the 2nd Tank Infantry Regiment was disbanded and the regiment's command and depot formed the 32nd Tank Infantry Regiment as an operational unit for the II Armored Brigade. Already a day earlier, on 30 November 1938, the 1st Tank Infantry Regiment had transferred its IV Tank Battalion M to the new regiment, while on 1 December the 32nd Tank Infantry Regiment transferred its IV Tank Battalion L "Monti" and XXII Tank Battalion L "Coralli" to the 1st Tank Infantry Regiment. Afterwards the 1st Tank Infantry Regiment consisted of the following units:

- 1st Tank Infantry Regiment, in Vercelli
  - I Tank Battalion L "Ribet", in Turin
  - II Tank Battalion L "Berardi", in Alessandria
  - III Tank Battalion L "Paselli", in Monza
  - IV Tank Battalion L "Monti", in Bolzano
  - XXII Tank Battalion L "Coralli", in Fidenza
  - XXIII Tank Battalion L "Stennio", in Fidenza
  - 1st Training Center, in Vercelli
  - 1st Maintenance Workshop, in Vercelli

All of the regiment's battalions were equipped with L3/35 tankettes. In early 1939 the battalions dropped their names.

=== World War II ===
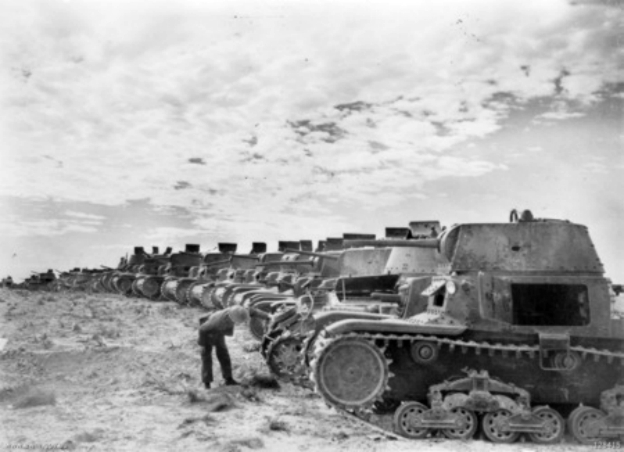
Italian tanks captured in the Battle of Beda Fomm

On 23 September 1939, the regiment transferred its III Tank Battalion L to the 32nd Tank Infantry Regiment, which in turn transferred on 1 November 1939 its CCCXXIII Tank Battalion M21/30 to the 1st Tank Infantry Regiment. Originally the CCCXXIII Tank Battalion M21/30, which was equipped with Fiat 3000 light tanks, had been the V Breach Tanks Battalion "Suarez" of the 4th Tank Infantry Regiment. On 6 November 1939, the 1st Tank Infantry Regiment transferred the XXII and XXIII tank battalions L to the 33rd Tank Infantry Regiment, which was formed on the same date in Parma.

In June 1940, the regiment participated with the I, II, and IV tank battalions L in the Italian invasion of France. The tankettes of the regiment attacked French positions in the Col du Mont Cenis sector. After the signing of the Franco-Italian Armistice the tank battalions advanced into Southern France, before returning to their bases in early July. On 1 August 1940, the regiment transferred its I and II tank battalions L to the 32nd Tank Infantry Regiment. At the same time the CCCXXIII Tank Battalion M21/30 was equipped with M13/40 tanks and renamed III Tank Battalion M13/40. In September 1940, the III Tank Battalion M13/40 was sent to Libya, where it joined the Special Armored Brigade.

At the end of summer of 1940, the regimental command and IV Tank Battalion L were transferred to Libya. The regimental command moved to Mechili, where it took up administrative and logistic duties, while the regiment's commanding officer Colonel Pietro Aresca took command of the Special Armored Brigade's I Tank Group (also known as "Aresca Group"). On 26 December 1940, the IV Tank Battalion L was transferred to the X Army Corps. The regiment's command remained in Mechili until 24 January 1941, when advancing British forces pushed the Italians out of Mechili. The regimental command retreated with the remnants of the Italian 10th Army along the Via Balbia, but British forces cut off the escape route at Beda Fomm. On 6-7 February 1941, the Battle of Beda Fomm raged, which ended with the surrender of the last Italian units, including the regimental command of the 1st Tank Infantry Regiment, which was declared lost due to wartime events on 8 February 1941.

On 15 March 1941, the 1st Tank Infantry Regiment was reformed in Vercelli by reorganizing the command of the regiment's depot. For a short time the regiment was assigned to the 136th Armored Division "Giovani Fascisti", which was in the process of being formed. The envisioned structure of the regiment would have included the XVI Tank Battalion M14/41, which was being formed by the depot of the 32nd Tank Infantry Regiment, the III Tank Group "Lancieri di Novara", which was equipped with L6/40 light tanks and was being formed by the depot of the cavalry Regiment "Lancieri di Novara", the 54th Maintenance Workshop, an anti-aircraft company equipped with 20/65 mod. 35 anti-aircraft guns, and a Repair and Recovery Unit. However the regiment never deployed with the divisions, which was sent unfinished to Libya to shore up Axis forces fighting in the Western Desert campaign.

In spring 1941, the regiment's depot formed the X Tank Battalion M13/40, which was assigned in June 1941 to the 133rd Tank Infantry Regiment. In summer 1941, the depot formed the command and one company of the XV Tank Battalion M13/40, while the battalion's second company was formed by the 4th Tank Infantry Regiment. Once M14/41 tanks became available, the XV Tank Battalion was re-equipped with M14/41 tanks. The battalion remained with the 1st Tank Infantry Regiment until November 1942, when it was sent to Libya with the 31st Tank Infantry Regiment. In November 1941, the regiment's depot formed the I Tank Battalion Lf (with Lf standing for Italian: "Lanciafiamme" or Flamethrower). However already a month later the battalion was disbanded and one of its two companies joined the II Tank Battalion Lf, which had been formed by the depot of the 4th Tank Infantry Regiment, while the other company was transferred to the Italian Montenegro Troops Command.

Meanwhile, the regiment's IV Tank Battalion L, which had remained in Libya, participated in April 1941 in Operation Sonnenblume, during which Axis forces retook the Cyrenaica. In July 1941, the battalion returned to Mechili and the battalion command and 1st Company remained there to garrison the important logistic hub, while the battalion's 2nd Company was sent to Tobruk, where it fought in the Siege of Tobruk. The battalion's 3rd Company was attached in September 1941 to the 55th Infantry Division "Savona", which garrisoned the front towards Egypt. On 18 November 1941, the British Eighth Army commenced Operation Crusader, which broke the Siege of Tobruk and threw Axis forces back to their starting positions at El Agheila. During the British offensive the IV Tank Battalion L and its companies were destroyed and, on 1 January 1942, the battalion was declared lost due to wartime events.

In February 1942, the regiment's depot formed the 1st and 2nd tank companies M21/30 with the last available Fiat 3000 light tanks. The two companies were sent to Sicily, where they were assigned to the XVI Army Corps, which was tasked with the defence of the Southern part of the island. On 10 July 1943, the day allied forces landed on Sicily, the 1st Tank Company M21/30 was attached to the 207th Coastal Division in the area of Licata, while the 2nd Tank Company M21/30 was assigned to the Mobile Group "H" in the area of Scordia. Both companies with their obsolete light tanks were destroyed in the following days.

On 6 May 1943, the XVI Tank Battalion M14/41 deployed to Sardinia, where it joined the 32nd Tank Infantry Regiment. In August 1943, the regiment's depot began with the formation of the I Tank Battalion P26/40 (with P standing for Italian: "Pesante" or Heavy), which was to receive the first of the new P26/40 tanks. However, in the evening of 8 September 1943, the Armistice of Cassibile, which ended hostilities between the Kingdom of Italy and the Anglo-American Allies, was announced by General Dwight D. Eisenhower on Radio Algiers and by Marshal Pietro Badoglio on Italian radio. Germany reacted by invading Italy and the 1st Tank Infantry Regiment and its depot were soon thereafter disbanded by German forces.

=== Cold War ===
On 15 March 1948, the Tank School in Rome formed the I Tank Battalion, which was equipped with M4 Sherman tanks. On 10 July 1948, the school reformed the 1st Tankers Regiment and formed the II Tank Battalion. On 7 September of the same year, the regiment was assigned to the Armored Brigade "Ariete", which had been formed on 1 June 1948. On 1 April 1949, the 1st Tankers Regiment was renamed 132nd Tankers Regiment.

On 1 May 1959, the Italian Army established the Armored Units Training Center in Teulada in Sardinia, which on 1 May 1974 was renamed 1st Armored Infantry Regiment. The regiment was assigned the flag and traditions of the 1st Tank Infantry Regiment and at the time consisted of the following units:

- 1st Armored Infantry Regiment, in Teulada
  - Command and Services Company
  - I Armored Battalion
    - 1st Tank Company, with Leopard 1A2 main battle tanks
    - 2nd Bersaglieri Company, with M113 armored personnel carriers
    - 3rd Self-propelled Battery, with M109G 155 mm self-propelled howitzers
  - II Armored Battalion (Reserve)
    - same organization as I Armored Battalion
  - Auto Unit
  - Special Medium Workshop
  - Carabinieri Squad

In June 1987 the regiment was reorganized and then consisted of the following units:

- 1st Armored Infantry Regiment, in Teulada
  - Command, Maintenance, and Transport Unit
  - 1st Armored Battalion
    - Command and Services Company
    - 1st Tank Company, with Leopard 1A2 main battle tanks
    - 2nd Bersaglieri Company, with VCC-2 armored personnel carriers
    - 3rd Self-propelled Battery, with M109G 155 mm self-propelled howitzers
  - Carabinieri Squad

On 9 March 1993, the regiment was renamed 1st Armored Regiment and again reorganized:

- 1st Armored Infantry Regiment, in Teulada
  - Command and Services Company
  - 1st Armored Battalion
    - 1st Tank Company, with Leopard 1A2 main battle tanks
    - 2nd Bersaglieri Company, with VCC-2 armored personnel carriers
    - 3rd Support Weapons Company, with TOW anti-tank guided missiles and M113 with 120 mm mortars
    - 4th Self-propelled Field Artillery Battery, with M109G 155 mm self-propelled howitzers
  - Maintenance Company
  - Garrison Unit
  - Carabinieri Squad

On 1 June 1999, the tankers specialty was transferred from the infantry arm to the cavalry arm. Consequently, on the same date the regiment replaced its flag with a cavalry standard. In 2009, the 3rd Bersaglieri Regiment moved from Milan to Teulada and shares since then the base with the 1st Armored Regiment.

== Organization ==
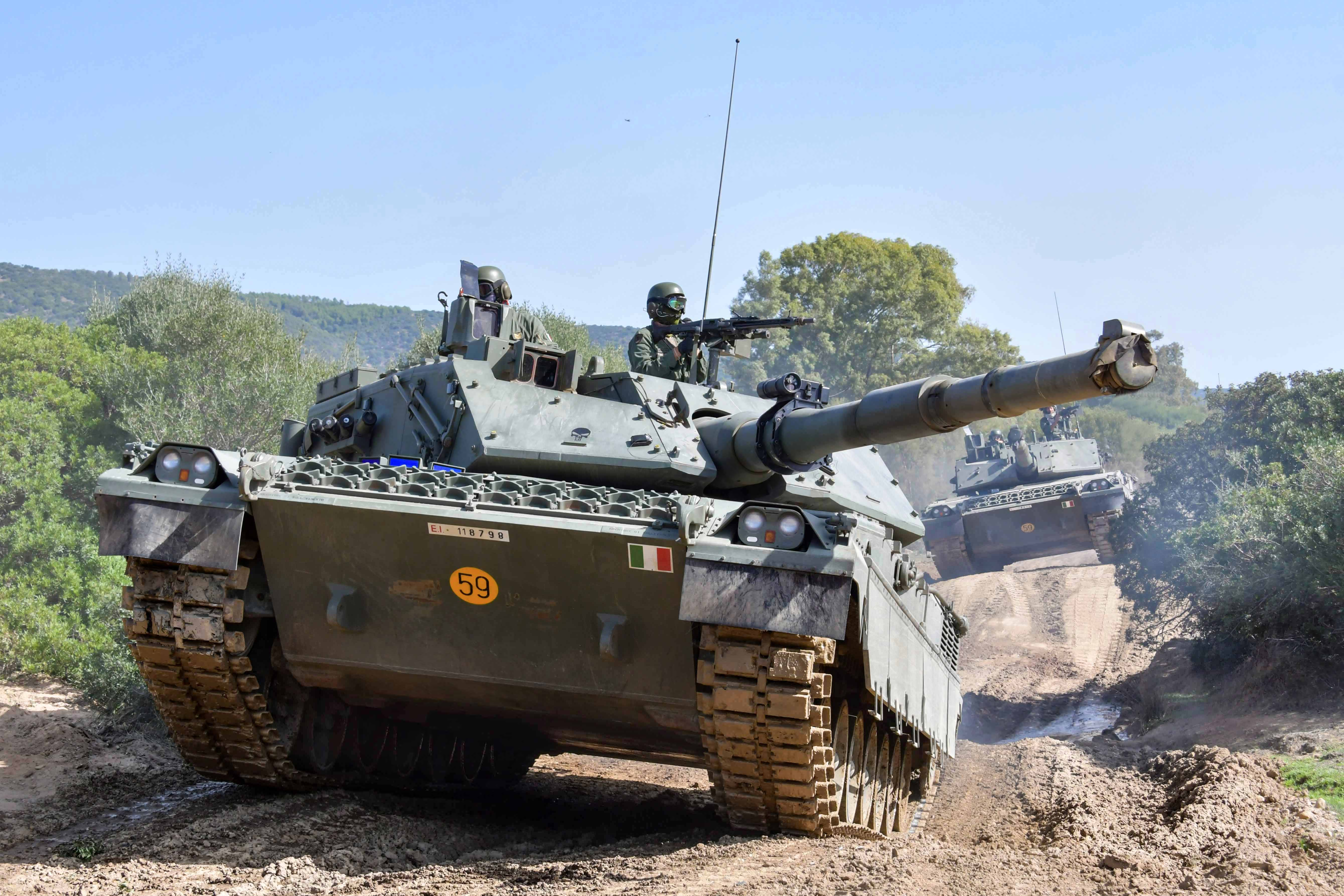
4th Tank Regiment Ariete tanks during an exercise at Capo Teulada

As of 2025 the 1st Armored Regiment is organized as follows:

- 1st Armored Regiment, in Teulada
  - Personnel Office
  - Administration Office
  - Logistics Office
  - General Services and Support Company
  - Training Range Center
