= Logistic Battalion "Trieste" =

Inactive Italian Army brigade logistics unit

- Battaglione Logistico "Trieste"
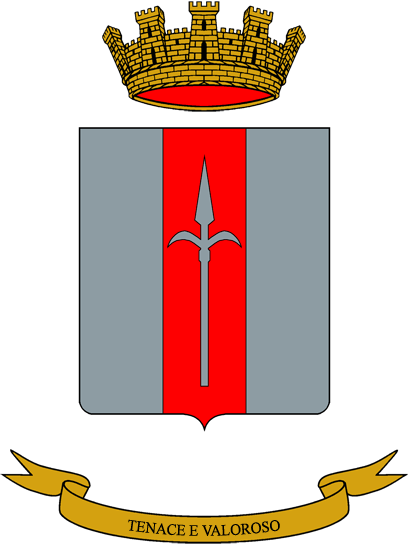
- Battalion coat of arms
- Active: 18 Sept. 1975 — 31 May 1991
- Country: Italy
- Branch: Italian Army
- Type: Military logistics
- Part of: Mechanized Brigade "Trieste"
- Garrison/HQ: Budrio
- Motto: "Tenace e valoroso"
- Anniversaries: 22 May 1916 - Battle of Asiago

Insignia
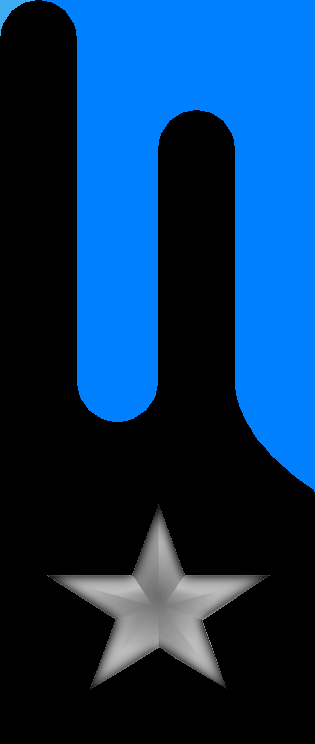
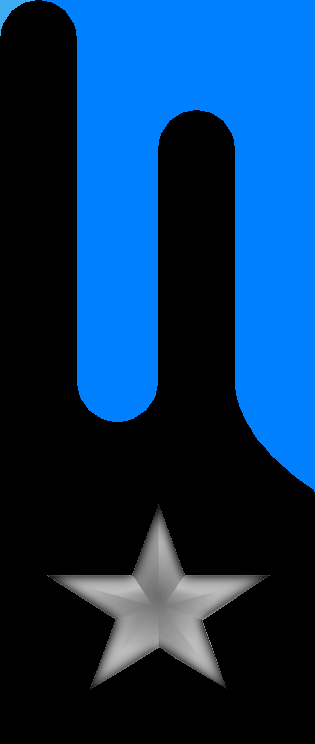
- Unit gorget patches

The Logistic Battalion "Trieste" (Italian: Battaglione Logistico "Trieste") is an inactive military logistics battalion of the Italian Army, which was assigned to the Mechanized Brigade "Trieste". The battalion's anniversary falls, as for all units of the Italian Army's Transport and Materiel Corps, on 22 May, the anniversary of the Royal Italian Army's first major use of automobiles to transport reinforcements to the Asiago plateau to counter the Austro-Hungarian Asiago Offensive in May 1916.

== History ==
The battalion is the spiritual successor of the logistic units of the Royal Italian Army's 101st Motorized Division "Trieste", which fought in the Italian invasion of France, Greco-Italian War, Western Desert campaign, and Tunisian campaign of World War II. In May 1943, the division surrendered to the Allies at the conclusion of the Tunisian campaign and was declared lost due to wartime events.

=== Cold War ===
On 1 June 1950, the division was reformed in Bologna as Infantry Division "Trieste". On 15 October 1954, the division was split in two formations: the Grouping "Trieste" and the Grouping "Bologna". The Grouping "Trieste" moved from Bologna to the city of Trieste, when the city reverted back to Italian control on 26 October 1954. On 23 October 1954, the "Trieste" division was disbanded. However, on 15 September 1955, the Grouping "Bologna" was expanded to division and renamed Infantry Division "Trieste. On 6 October 1956, the logistic units of the division were assigned to the newly formed Service Units Command "Trieste" in Bologna. The command consisted of a medical section, a provisions section, a mobile vehicle park, a mobile workshop, and an auto unit.

On 1 July 1960, the mobile vehicle park, mobile workshop, and the light workshop of the division's 40th Infantry Regiment "Bologna" merged to form the Resupply, Repairs, Recovery Unit "Trieste". On 20 October 1960, the division was reduced to Infantry Brigade "Trieste" and consequently on the same day, the Service Units Command "Trieste" was disbanded. Afterwards, the "Trieste" brigade was supported by the Resupply, Repairs, Recovery Unit "Trieste" and the Auto Unit "Trieste".

As part of the 1975 army reform the Infantry Brigade "Trieste" was reorganized as Mechanized Brigade "Trieste". On 18 September 1975, the Resupply, Repairs, Recovery Unit "Trieste" and the Auto Unit "Trieste" merged to form the Logistic Battalion "Trieste" in Budrio. The battalion consisted of a command, a command platoon, a supply and transport company, a medium workshop, and a vehicle park. At the time the battalion fielded 692 men (38 officers, 85 non-commissioned officers, and 569 soldiers).

On 12 November 1976, the President of the Italian Republic Giovanni Leone granted with decree 846 the battalion a flag.

In October 1980, the battalion added a reserve medical unit and in 1981 the battalion was reorganized and consisted afterwards of the following units:

- Logistic Battalion "Trieste", in Budrio
  - Command and Services Company
  - Supply Company
  - Maintenance Company
  - Medium Transport Company
  - Medical Unit (Reserve)

=== Recent times ===
After the end of the Cold War the Italian Army began to draw down its forces. Consequently, the Mechanized Brigade "Trieste" and Motorized Brigade "Friuli" were ordered to merge into one brigade. On 31 May 1991, the Mechanized Brigade "Trieste" and Logistic Battalion "Friuli" were disbanded. The next day the Logistic Battalion "Trieste" in Budrio was renamed Logistic Battalion "Friuli" and joined the Mechanized Brigade "Friuli". Subsequently, the flag of the Logistic Battalion "Trieste" was transferred to the Shrine of the Flags in the Vittoriano in Rome for safekeeping.

== See also ==
- Military logistics
