= 31st Tank Regiment (Italy) =

Inactive Italian Army tank unit

- 31° Reggimento Carri
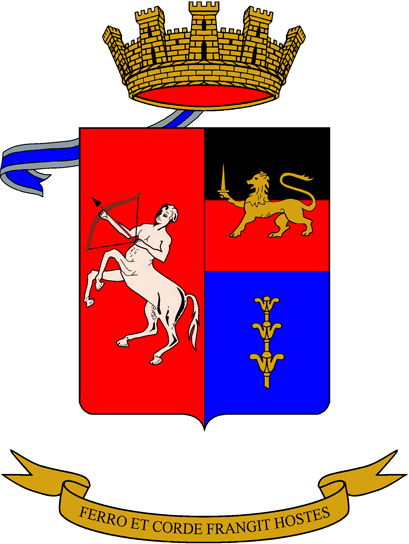
- Regimental coat of arms
- Active: 15 July 1937 — 8 Sept. 1943; 15 Sept. 1951 — 10 Jan. 2020
- Country: Italy
- Branch: Italian Army
- Part of: Mechanized Brigade "Pinerolo"
- Garrison/HQ: Lecce
- Motto: "Ferro et corde frangit hostes"
- Anniversaries: 15 April 1941
- Decorations: 1x Silver Medal of Military Valor; 1x Bronze Medal of Civil Merit

Insignia
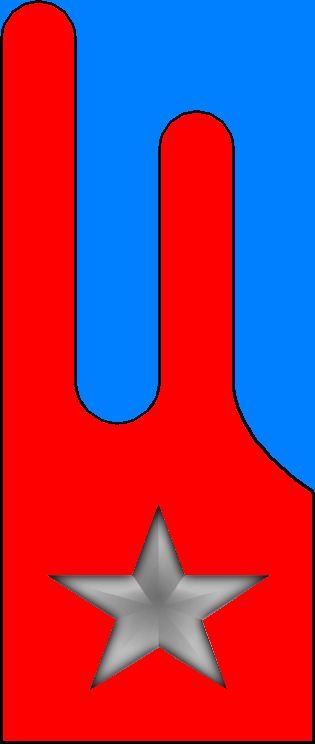
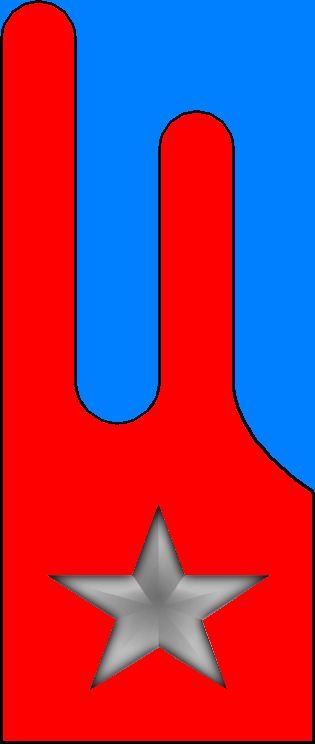
- Tank units gorget patches

The 31st Tank Regiment (Italian: 31° Reggimento Carri) is an inactive tank regiment of the Italian Army, which was based in Lecce in Apulia and last operationally assigned to the Mechanized Brigade "Pinerolo". The regiment was formed in July 1937 by the Royal Italian Army and assigned to the I Armored Brigade. In April 1939, the regiment moved from Siena to Tirana in occupied Albania. In winter 1940-41, the regiment fought in the Greco-Italian War and in 1941 in the invasion of Yugoslavia. In November 1942, the regiment was sent to Libya, where it fought in the Western Desert campaign and then in the Tunisian campaign. In April 1943, the regiment was disbanded due to the heavy losses it had suffered in the Battle of El Guettar. The regiment was immediately reformed in Italy, but it saw no further action, until invading German forces disbanded it after the announcement of the Armistice of Cassibile on 8 September 1943.

In 1951, the regiment was reformed and assigned to the Armored Division "Centauro". In 1975, the regiment was disbanded and its flag and traditions were assigned to the 1st Tank Battalion "M.O. Cracco", which had become an autonomous unit on 21 October 1975. From 1975 to 1986, the 1st Tank Battalion "M.O. Cracco" was assigned to the 31st Armored Brigade "Curtatone" and then to the 31st Armored Brigade "Centauro". In 1993, the 1st Tank Battalion "M.O. Cracco" lost its autonomy and, on 1 September 1993, entered the reformed 31st Tank Regiment. In 1995, the flag of the 31st Tank Regiment was transferred to Altamura, where it took over the base, personnel, and materiel of the 133rd Tank Regiment, that had been reduced to a reserve unit. The 31st Tank regiment was now assigned to the Mechanized Brigade "Pinerolo". Originally the unit, like all Italian tank units, was part of the army's infantry arm, but on 1 June 1999 the tankers specialty was transferred from the infantry arm to the cavalry arm. Consequently, on the same date the regiment replaced its flag with a cavalry standard. In 2012, the regiment moved from Altamura to Lecce. On 10 January 2020, the 31st Tank Regiment was disbanded and its standard transferred to the Shrine of the Flags in the Vittoriano in Rome, while on the same date the personnel of the disbanded regiment was used to reform the Regiment "Cavalleggeri di Lodi" (15th). Originally the unit, like all Italian tank units, was part of the army's infantry arm, but on 1 June 1999 the tankers specialty was transferred from the infantry arm to the cavalry arm. The regiment's anniversary falls on 15 April 1941, the day the regiment defeat an attack by Royal Yugoslav Army forces near Koplik.

== History ==
On 15 July 1937, the 31st Tank Infantry Regiment was formed in Siena. The new regiment received the I Breach Tanks Battalion "Raggi" from the 3rd Tank Infantry Regiment, the II Breach Tanks Battalion "Alessi" from the 4th Tank Infantry Regiment, and the XXXI Assault Tanks Battalion "Cerboni" from the 5th Bersaglieri Regiment. On the same date the regiment joined the I Armored Brigade, which also included the 5th Bersaglieri Regiment. The breach tank battalions were equipped with Fiat 3000 mod. 30 light tanks, and the assault tanks battalion with L3/33 tankettes. In 1938, all Assault Tank Battalions were renamed Tank Battalion L (with L standing for Italian: "Leggero" or Light), while Breach Tanks Battalions were renamed Tank Battalion M (with M standing for Italian: "Medio" or Medium). On 30 November 1938, the regiment received the VII Tank Battalion L from the 3rd Tank Infantry Regiment.

On 20 April 1939, the 131st Armored Artillery Regiment and assigned to the I Armored Brigade, which on the same date was expanded to division and renamed 131st Armored Division "Centauro". In April 1939, the regiment moved with two of its battalions to Tirana in occupied Albania. The same month the regiment's two tank battalions M were renumbered and the regiment then consisted of the following units:

- 31st Tank Infantry Regiment, in Tirana
  - VII Tank Battalion L, in Tirana
  - XXXI Tank Battalion L, in Tirana
  - CCCXI Tank Battalion M, in Siena (former I Tank Battalion M)
  - CCCXII Tank Battalion M, in Massa (former II Tank Battalion M)

On 20 May 1939, the CCCXI and CCCXII tank battalions M were transferred to the 4th Tank Infantry Regiment, which in turn transferred the VIII Tank Battalion L and X Tank Battalion L to the 31st Tank Infantry Regiment. The latter two battalions had participated in April 1939 in the Italian invasion of Albania and remained in Albania on occupation duty.

=== World War II ===
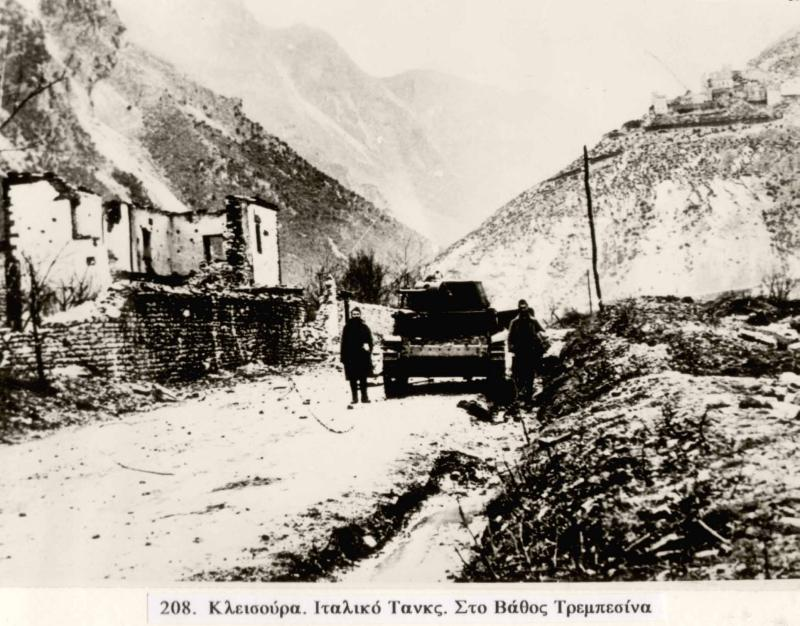
Italian M13/40 tank captured by Greek forces at Klisura Pass

In April 1940, the regiment's battalions were renumbered once more and the regiment then consisted of the following units:

- 31st Tank Infantry Regiment, in Parma
  - I Tank Battalion L (former VII Tank Battalion L)
  - II Tank Battalion L (former VIII Tank Battalion L)
  - III Tank Battalion L (former X Tank Battalion L)
  - IV Tank Battalion L (former XXXI Tank Battalion L)

On 28 October 1940, the 131st Armored Division "Centauro" participated in the Italian attack on Greece, which started the Greco-Italian War. The main body of the division advanced towards Kalpaki in Epirus, but Greek resistance stopped the division before reaching its goals. On 23 November 1940, the Greek launched an offensive, which drove the Italian units back into Albania. The Centauro unsuccessfully tried to stop the Greek advance in the Battle of Klisura Pass and then in Tepelenë. In January 1941, the IV Tank Battalion M13/40 of the 32nd Tank Infantry Regiment arrived in Albania and was attached to the Centauro division. Due to the heavy losses the division had suffered it was taken out of the line on 4 February 1941. In late March 1941, the Centauro division moved, in preparation for the invasion of Yugoslavia, to Shkodër in northern Albania. On 6 April 1941, the invasion began and the Centauro, together with the 18th Infantry Division "Messina" and 32nd Infantry Division "Marche", defeated a Yugoslav counterattack towards Shkodër. On 15 April 1941, the division defeated another Yugoslav attack near Koplik, and the next day, on 16 April, the division crossed into Yugoslavia north of Koplik and advanced to Kotor, Cetinje and Podgorica. On 17 April 1941, the Centauro reached Trebinje, where it met up with units of the 133rd Armored Division "Littorio", which had advanced southward from Istria. On 11 May 1941, the division began the return transfer to its bases in Tuscany and the IV Tank Battalion M13/40 was assigned to the 31st Tank Infantry Regiment. For its conduct and sacrifice in Greece and then Yugoslavia the regiment was awarded a Silver Medal of Military Valor, which was affixed to the regiment's flag.

In Tuscany the II and IV tank battalions L were disbanded and their personnel used to form the LI Tank Battalion M14/41, which was equipped with M14/41 tanks. The IV Tank Battalion M13/40 also received M14/41 tanks and consequently changed its name to IV Tank Battalion M14/41. During this time the regiment also added an anti-aircraft company with 20/65 mod. 35 anti-aircraft guns. On 21 November 1941, the regiment received the XIII Tank Battalion M13/40 from the 32nd Tank Infantry Regiment. On 15 January 1942, the I and III tank battalions L left the regiment and moved to occupied Croatia, respectively occupied Montenegro, where they were engaged in heavy combat with Yugoslav partisans. On 1 February 1942, the depot of the 31st Tank Infantry Regiment formed the XIX Tank Battalion M15/42, which was equipped with M15/42 tanks. In March 1942, the LI Tank Battalion M14/41 was sent to Libya, where it was assigned to the 133rd Tank Infantry Regiment and, on 21 April 1942, the IV Tank Battalion M14/41 was sent to Libya and assigned to the 133rd Tank Infantry Regiment. In July 1942, the XIII Tank Battalion M13/40 was ordered to Libya, where it was assigned in early August to the 132nd Tank Infantry Regiment of the 132nd Armored Division "Ariete". In August 1942, the regiment received the XIV Tank Battalion M13/40 from the 33rd Tank Infantry Regiment and the XVII Tank Battalion M13/40 from the 4th Tank Infantry Regiment, which were both re-equipped with M14/41 tanks.

Starting in 1942 the regiment trained units equipped with self-propelled guns. In April 1942, the regiment's depot formed the I Self-propelled Battalion 47/32, which was equipped with Semovente da 47/32 self-propelled guns and assigned to the 1st Infantry Division "Superga". On 1 September 1942, the depot formed the CXXXVI Self-propelled Battalion 47/32 and, on 15 October 1942, the CXXXI Self-propelled Battalion 47/32.

In November 1942, the 31st Tank Infantry Regiment was sent to North Africa, where at the same time the Axis forces suffered a crushing defeat in the Second Battle of El Alamein. The regiment arrived in Libya with the following battalions:

- 31st Tank Infantry Regiment
  - XIV Tank Battalion M14/41
  - XV Tank Battalion M14/41
  - XVII Tank Battalion M14/41

The XV Tank Battalion M14/41 had been formed by the 1st Tank Infantry Regiment and was assigned to the 31st Tank Infantry Regiment when it left for Libya. The regiment was also supposed to receive the XIX Tank Battalion M15/42, but ultimately the battalion remained in Tuscany and became part of the forces tasked with the coastal defense of southern Tuscany. After arriving in North Africa the 31st Tank Regiment fought in the Tunisian campaign, where it suffered heavy casualties in the battles of El Agheila and El Guettar. On 18 April 1943, the regiment was disbanded in Tunisia due to the heavy losses it had suffered at El Guettar.

On the same day, 18 April 1943, the regiment was reformed in Siena. Plans to expand the regiment again to full strength were thwarted by the announcement of the Armistice of Cassibile on 8 September 1943, and the subsequent occupation of Italy by the German forces, which disbanded the 31st Tank Infantry Regiment.

=== Cold War ===
On 15 September 1951, the regiment was reformed in Verona as 31st Tankers Regiment. On the same date, the regiment received the III Battalion of the 132nd Tankers Regiment, which, upon entering the reformed regiment, was redesignated as I Battalion. The 31st Tankers Regiment was assigned to the Armored Brigade "Centauro", which on 1 November 1952 was expanded to Armored Division "Centauro". On 1 January 1952, the regiment formed the II Battalion, and on 15 February 1953 the III Battalion. On 10 October 1955, the regiment moved from Verona to Bellinzago Novarese. In December 1958, the regiment was renamed 31st Tank Regiment and, on 1 February 1959, the regiment's III Tank Battalion was redesignated as IV Tank Battalion. At the time the regiment's organization was as follows:

- 31st Tank Regiment, in Bellinzago Novarese
  - Command Company
  - I Tank Battalion, with M26 Pershing tanks
  - II Tank Battalion, with M26 Pershing tanks
  - IV Tank Battalion, with M26 Pershing tanks

In 1963, the Armored Division "Centauro" adapted its organization to NATO standards and added a brigade level to the division's organization. On 1 November 1963, the III Armored Brigade "Centauro" was formed in Novara and the 31st Tank Regiment, as well as support forces, entered the new brigade. On the same date the IV Tank Battalion was transferred from the 31st Tank Regiment to the 3rd Bersaglieri Regiment, which in turn transferred its XX Battalion to the 31st Tank Regiment. Upon entering the 31st Tank Regiment the XX Battalion was redesignated as XXVIII Bersaglieri Battalion. Afterwards the brigade consisted of the following units:

- III Armored Brigade "Centauro", in Novara
  - 31st Tank Regiment, in Bellinzago Novarese
    - I Tank Battalion, with M47 Patton main battle tanks
    - II Tank Battalion, with M47 Patton main battle tanks
    - XXVIII Bersaglieri Battalion, with M113 armored personnel carriers
    - Anti-tank Company, with M40 recoilless rifles
  - III Group/ 131st Armored Artillery Regiment, with M7 Priest self-propelled howitzers
  - III Service Battalion
  - 3rd Engineer Company
  - 3rd Signal Company

On 1 October 1968, the brigade headquarters were disbanded, however the IV Tank Battalion and XXVIII Bersaglieri Battalion did not return to their original regiments. In November 1968, the regiment was deployed to the Province of Vercelli to help rescue efforts after heavy floods had devastated the area. For its work in Vercelli the regiment was awarded a Bronze Medal of Civil Merit, which was affixed to the regiment's flag.

During the 1975 army reform the army disbanded the regimental level and newly independent battalions were granted for the first time their own flags, respectively in the case of cavalry units, their own standard. On 20 October 1975, the 31st Tank Regiment was disbanded and the next day the regiment's I Tank Battalion became an autonomous unit and was renamed 1st Tank Battalion "M.O. Cracco". As part of the reform tank and armored battalions were named for officers, soldiers and partisans of the tank speciality, who had served in World War II and been awarded Italy's highest military honor the Gold Medal of Military Valor. The 1st Tank Battalion was named for Corporal Giovanni Cracco, who, while serving as a M14/41 tank loader with the 31st Tank Infantry Regiment in the Tunisian campaign, was killed in action against British forces on 11 April 1943 near El Guettar.

On the same date, 21 October 1975, the regiment's II Tank Battalion became an autonomous unit and was renamed 101st Tank Battalion "M.O. Zappalà", while the XXVIII Bersaglieri Battalion became an autonomous unit and was renamed 28th Bersaglieri Battalion "Oslavia". The three battalions were then assigned to the 31st Armored Brigade "Curtatone", which was formed on the same day by reorganizing the command of the 31st Tank Regiment. The two tank battalions consisted of a command, a command and services company, and three tank companies with Leopard 1A2 main battle tanks. Each of the two battalions fielded now 434 men (32 officers, 82 non-commissioned officers, and 320 soldiers). On 12 November 1976, the President of the Italian Republic Giovanni Leone assigned with decree 846 the flag and traditions of the 31st Tank Regiment to the 1st Tank Battalion "M.O. Cracco" and the flag and traditions of the 131st Tank Infantry Regiment to the 101st Tank Battalion "M.O. Zappalà".

In 1986, the Italian Army abolished the divisional level and brigades, which until then had been under one of the Army's four divisions, came forthwith under direct command of the Army's 3rd Army Corps or 5th Army Corps. As the Armored Division "Centauro" carried a historically significant name, the division ceased to exist on 31 October in Novara, and the next day in the same location the 31st Armored Brigade "Centauro" was activated. The new brigade took command of the units of the 31st Armored Brigade "Curtatone", whose name was stricken from the roll of active units of the Italian Army.

=== Recent times ===
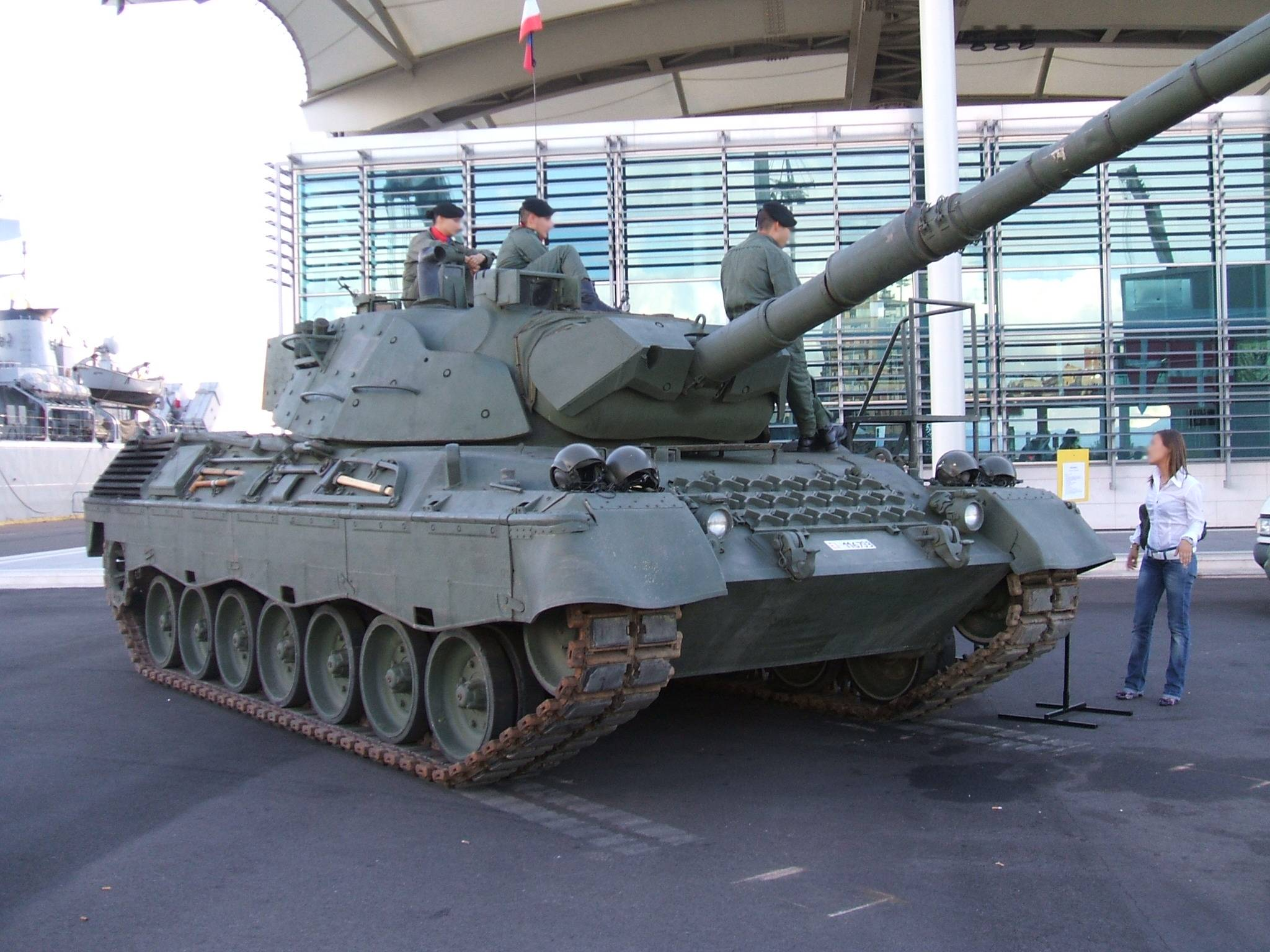
Leopard 1A5 main battle tank of the 31st Tank Regiment in 2008

After the end of the Cold War Italian Army began to draw down its forces and, on 31 July 1993, the 101st Tank Battalion "M.O. Zappalà" was disbanded and its personnel merged into the 1st Tank Battalion "M.O. Cracco". On 31 August of the same year, the 1st Tank Battalion "M.O. Cracco" lost its autonomy and the next day, on 1 September 1993, the battalion entered the reformed 31st Tank Regiment.

On 8 October 1995, the 4th Tank Regiment disbanded its companies in Civitavecchia and the next day, on 9 October 1995, the flag of the 4th Tank Regiment arrived in Bellinzago Novarese, where it replaced the flag of the 31st Tank Regiment. On the same date, 9 October 1995, the 133rd Tank Regiment in Altamura was reduced to reserve unit, which was to be formed in case of war by the Tank School in Lecce. The next day, on 10 October 1995, the flag of the 31st Tank Regiment arrived in Altamura, where it took over the base, personnel, and materiel of the 133rd Tank Regiment. The 31st Tank Regiment was now assigned to the Mechanized Brigade "Pinerolo" and equipped with Leopard 1A5 main battle tanks. On 1 June 1999, the tankers specialty was transferred from the infantry arm to the cavalry arm. Consequently, on the same date the regiment replaced its flag with a cavalry standard. In 2008, the regiment was replaced its Leopard 1A5 main battle tanks with Ariete main battle tanks.

From 1 January 2011 to 28 February 2017, the regiment was assigned to the Italian Army's Cavalry School in Lecce as test unit for the "Future Soldier" networked warfighting project. In 2012, the regiment moved from Altamura to Lecce. On 10 January 2020, the 31st Tank Regiment was disbanded and its standard transferred to the Shrine of the Flags in the Vittoriano in Rome, while on the same date the personnel of the disbanded regiment was used to reform the Regiment "Cavalleggeri di Lodi" (15th).

== See also ==
- Mechanized Brigade "Pinerolo"
