= 19th Armored Battalion "M.O. Tumiati" =

Inactive Italian Army tank unit

- 19° Battaglione Corazzato "M.O. Tumiati"
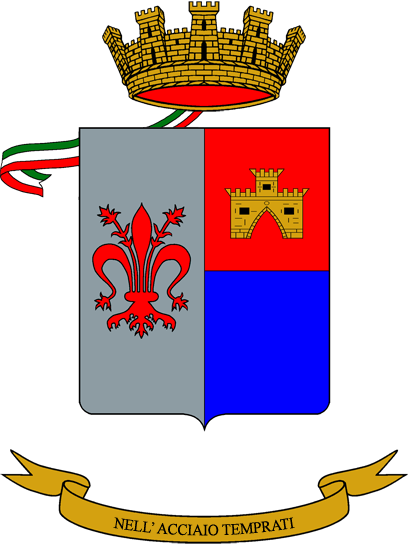
- Battalion coat of arms
- Active: 1 Feb. 1942 — 11 Sept. 1943; 1 May 1960 — 6 March 1991
- Country: Italy
- Branch: Italian Army
- Part of: Motorized Brigade "Friuli"
- Garrison/HQ: Florence
- Motto: "Nell'Acciaio Temprati"
- Anniversaries: 1 October 1927
- Decorations: 1x Bronze Medal of Civil Valor

Insignia
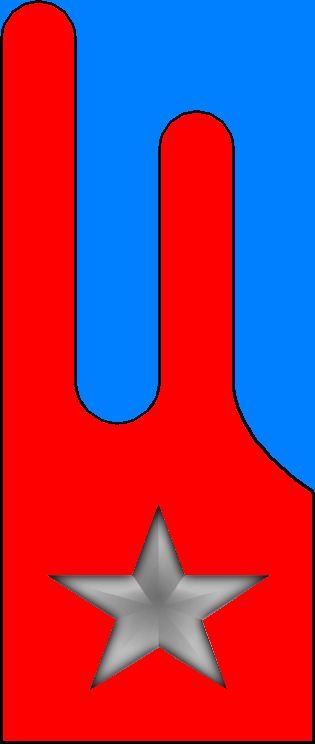
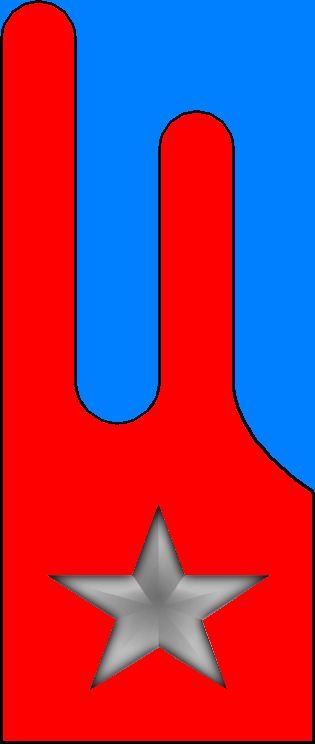
- Tank units gorget patches

The 19th Armored Battalion "M.O. Tumiati" (Italian: 19° Battaglione Corazzato "M.O. Tumiati") is an inactive armored battalion of the Italian Army, which was based in Florence in Tuscany and last operationally assigned to the Mechanized Brigade "Friuli". The unit's lineage traces back to the World War II XIX Tank Battalion M15/42, which was formed in 1942 in Siena by the depot of the 31st Tank Infantry Regiment. After the announcement of the Armistice of Cassibile on 8 September 1943 the battalion fought invading German forces in Piombino, but due to a lack of ammunition and the overwhelming number of German forces the battalion destroyed its vehicles on 11 September and then its personnel dispersed. In 1960, the battalion was reformed and assigned to the Infantry Brigade "Friuli". In 1975, the battalion was renamed 19th Armored Battalion "M.O. Tumiati". In 1991, the battalion was disbanded and its flag transferred to the Shrine of the Flags in the Vittoriano in Rome.

Originally the unit, like all Italian tank units, was part of the army's infantry arm, but on 1 June 1999 the tankers specialty was transferred from the infantry arm to the cavalry arm. The battalion's anniversary falls, as for all tank units, which have not yet distinguished themselves in battle, on 1 October 1927, the day the tankers speciality was founded.

== History ==
=== World War II ===
On 1 February 1942, the depot of the 31st Tank Infantry Regiment in Siena formed the XIX Tank Battalion M15/42 (with M standing for Italian: "Medio" or Medium). The battalion was equipped with M15/42 tanks and based at Colle di Val d'Elsa. Initially the battalion was to be assigned to the 33rd Tank Infantry Regiment, but ultimately it remained with the 31st Tank Infantry Regiment and became part of the forces tasked with the coastal defense of Tuscany. On 1 August 1943, the battalion was assigned to the 215th Coastal Division, which was tasked with the coastal defense of the coast of southern Tuscany from Cap San Vincenzo in San Vincenzo to Albinia. The division was also responsible for the defense of the islands of the Tuscan Archipelago and the harbor of Piombino.

On 15 August 1943, the 136th Armored Legionary Division "Centauro" was transferred from the fascist militia to the Royal Italian Army and the XIX Tank Battalion M15/42 was one of the units the Army intended to assign to the division. Due to a lack of tanks the battalion at the time fielded 20 M15/42 tanks and 18 Semovente da 75/34 self-propelled guns. In the evening of 8 September 1943, the Armistice of Cassibile, which ended hostilities between the Kingdom of Italy and the Anglo-American Allies, was announced by General Dwight D. Eisenhower on Radio Algiers and by Marshal Pietro Badoglio on Italian radio. However, as the Italian King Victor Emmanuel III fled Rome without issuing orders, Italian military units were left without clear instructions how to respond to the German forces occupying Italian cities and towns. On 10 September, a German detachment tried to land by sea and occupy the harbor of Piombino. The Royal Italian Navy units guarding the harbor, as well as the Navy's coastal defense batteries, one battalion of the 215th Coastal Division, and armed civilians immediately began to fight the Germans, and a heavy battle ensued. By 18:00 in the evening the tanks and self-propelled guns of the XIX Tank Battalion M15/42 arrived in Piombino and opened fire on the German troops. The battle lasted until the early hours of 11 September, when the remaining German forces surrendered. However, due to a lack of ammunition and additional German forces on the way to Piombino, the XIX Tank Battalion M15/42 retreated to Venturina, where the battalion destroyed its tanks and self-propelled guns. Afterwards the battalion's personnel changed into civilian clothes and dispersed.

=== Cold War ===
On 1 May 1960, the Armored Battalion "Friuli" was formed in Rovezzano and assigned to the Infantry Brigade "Friuli". The battalion consisted of a command company, two tank companies, which were equipped with M47 Patton medium tanks, and one mechanized fusiliers company. In 1961, the battalion was renamed XIX Armored Battalion. For its conduct after the 1966 flood of the Arno river the battalion was awarded a Bronze Medal of Civil Valor, which was affixed to the battalion's flag and is depicted on the battalion's coat of arms.

During the 1975 army reform the army disbanded the regimental level and newly independent battalions were granted for the first time their own flags, respectively in the case of cavalry units, their own standard. On 23 September 1975, the XIX Armored Battalion was renamed 19th Armored Battalion "M.O. Tumiati". As part of the reform tank and armored battalions were named for officers, soldiers and partisans of the tank speciality, who had served in World War II and been awarded Italy's highest military honor the Gold Medal of Military Valor. The 19th Armored Battalion was named for Second Lieutenant Francesco Tumiati, who, after having served in 1941-1942 in the Western Desert Campaign, had returned to Italy in February 1942 and been assigned to the 32nd Tank Infantry Regiment. After the announcement of the Armistice of Cassibile he led part of his troops into the mountains and formed one of the first partisan detachments in the Marche region. After eight months of fighting the German occupiers Tumiati was captured on 17 May 1944 and immediately executed by a German firing squad.

The battalion was assigned to the Motorized Brigade "Friuli" and consisted of a command, a command and services company, two tank companies with M47 Patton tanks, and a mechanized company with M113 armored personnel carriers. The battalion fielded now 536 men (34 officers, 83 non-commissioned officers, and 419 soldiers). On 12 November 1976, the President of the Italian Republic Giovanni Leone granted with decree 846 the 19th Armored Battalion "M.O. Tumiati" its flag. In 1988 the battalion replaced its M47 Patton tanks with Leopard 1A2 main battle tanks.

=== Recent times ===
After the end of the Cold War Italian Army began to draw down its forces and, on 16 January 1991, the 19th Armored Battalion "M.O. Tumiati" was reduced to a reserve unit. On 6 March 1991, the battalion was disbanded and its flag transferred to the Shrine of the Flags in the Vittoriano in Rome for safekeeping.

== See also ==
- Motorized Brigade "Friuli"
