= Ozzano dell'Emilia =

- Comune
- Comune di Ozzano dell'Emilia
- Coat of arms

- Location within Italy Location within Emilia-Romagna
- Coordinates: 44°26′30″N 11°28′25″E
- Country: Italy
- Region: Emilia-Romagna
- Metropolitan city: Bologna (BO)
- Frazioni: Ciagnano, Le Armi, Maggio, Mercatale, La Noce, Osteria Nuova, Ponte Rizzoli, Quaderna, San Pietro, Sant'Andrea, Settefonti, Tolara

Government
  - Mayor: Luca Lelli

Area
  - Total: 64.95 km^{2} (25.08 sq mi)
- Elevation: 67 m (220 ft)

Population (31 December 2024)
  - Total: 14,279
  - Density: 219.8/km^{2} (569.4/sq mi)
- Demonym: Ozzanesi
- Time zone: UTC+1 (CET)
  - Summer (DST): UTC+2 (CEST)
- Postal code: 40064
- Dialing code: 051
- Patron saint: St. Christopher
- Saint day: July 25
- Website: Official website

Ozzano dell'Emilia (Italian pronunciation: [odˈdzaːno delleˈmiːlja]; Eastern Bolognese: Uzän) is an Italian comune in the Metropolitan City of Bologna, in northern Italy.

== History ==
Its origins date back to the Roman Empire, when the town, which was located in what is now the hamlet of Maggio was named Claterna.

== Twin Town ==
- Staffanstorp, Sweden
