= Tanks of Italy =

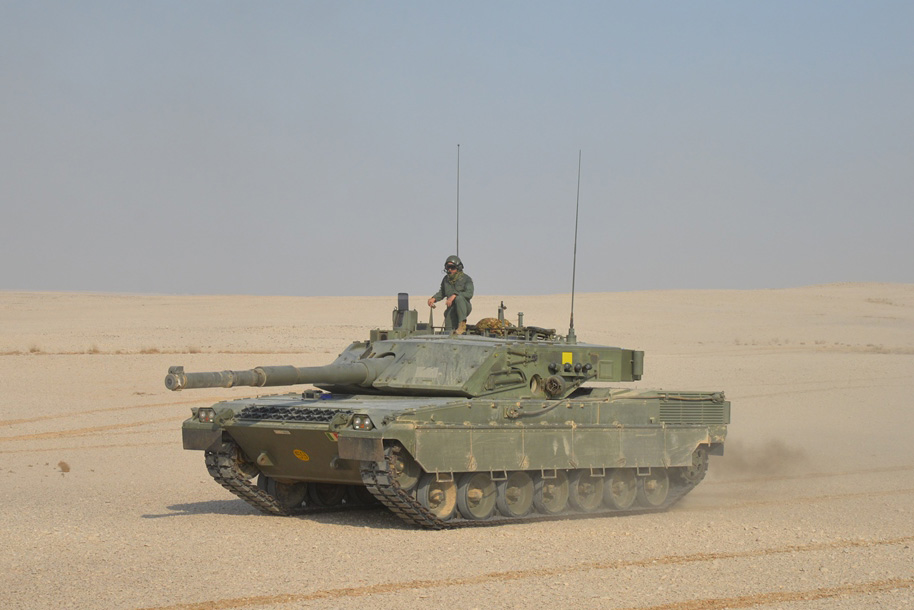
Ariete tank of the Italian Army

Tanks have been employed by the military forces of Italy since their first use in World War I. Initially, Italy built up its tank forces with imported French designs: the Renault FT and Schneider CA. Italy then opted for domestic production of copies of foreign tanks like the Fiat 3000 (Renault FT copy) and the L3 series of tankettes (based on the Carden Loyd tankette). From the Carden Loyd tankette-derived designs, Italy developed their own series of tanks during the interwar years.

During World War II, Italian tanks proved inadequate compared to its Allied and German contemporaries. The small Italian industrial base was incapable of fielding competitive designs, and Italian tanks had too thin armor and too weak armament. The problems became worse as the war wore on due to the rapid evolution of tanks during World War II.

With defeat in World War II, domestic Italian tank production ceased and in the post-war years it received tanks from the US as a NATO member state. In 1971 Italy began fielding the West German Leopard 1 as its main battle tank. From 1990, it was gradually phased out and ultimately replaced by the C1 Ariete starting in 1995.

== Overview ==
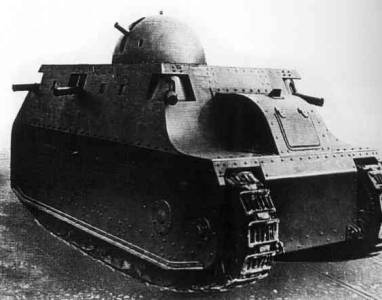
Fiat 2000 tank

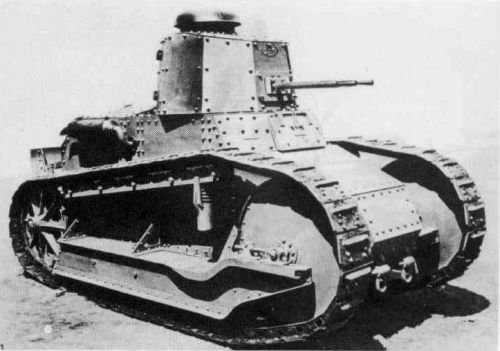
Fiat 3000 tank, model 21

Italy first built a heavy tank called the Fiat 2000 during World War I with a powerful gun, a 65/17 howitzer (of 65mm caliber with a barrel 17 calibers long), with the first prototype being partially finished in 1917, but just two were built. It then imported the French Renault FT and produced a slightly improved version, the Fiat 3000, before beginning its own designs. While the Fiat 3000 was being developed, France sent 100 of these FT tanks to Italy in 1918 so that Italian troops could get acquainted with tracked combat vehicles. By 1918, FIAT and Ansaldo, were the only industrial complex large enough to deal with tank production. The first model produced for the Royal Army (Regio Esercito), was the FIAT 3000 (by 1935 renamed L5/21). They were ready by 1922, and served well to forge Italian interwar armoured tactics and was in use until 1943. Another model developed in 1930, was the gun-armed (Vickers-Termi 37mm) serie II or FIAT 3000B. Both formed the bulk of the Italian army corps until new models arrived in 1935. Soon after, the official designations incorporated "Carro Armato or "CA" meaning "armed carriage". Italy bought a number of Carden Loyd Mark VIs, built a few licence copies designated CV-29, and then developed this design further. Italy produced a large number of CV-33 and CV-35 tankettes based on this Vickers-Carden-Lloyd concept.

A native Italian design was the L6/40, a very small light tank with a 20 mm Breda cannon and rivetted construction. A medium tank, based on the Vickers Six-Tonner, was the M11-M13 series which had a very good 47 mm gun, but very thin armor.

The Carro Armato (armored vehicle) was the Italian Army's designation for tanks from 1938 onwards. This would be followed by a letter and a series of numbers. The letter would be either L, M or P meaning light, medium, and heavy tank respectively. The official Italian military tank classification differed from contemporary classifications in other countries. The numbers would follow the pattern of X/Y where X would be the weight in tonnes and Y the year of adoption (i.e. the L6/40 weighs 6 tonnes and was adopted in the year 1940).

== Development ==
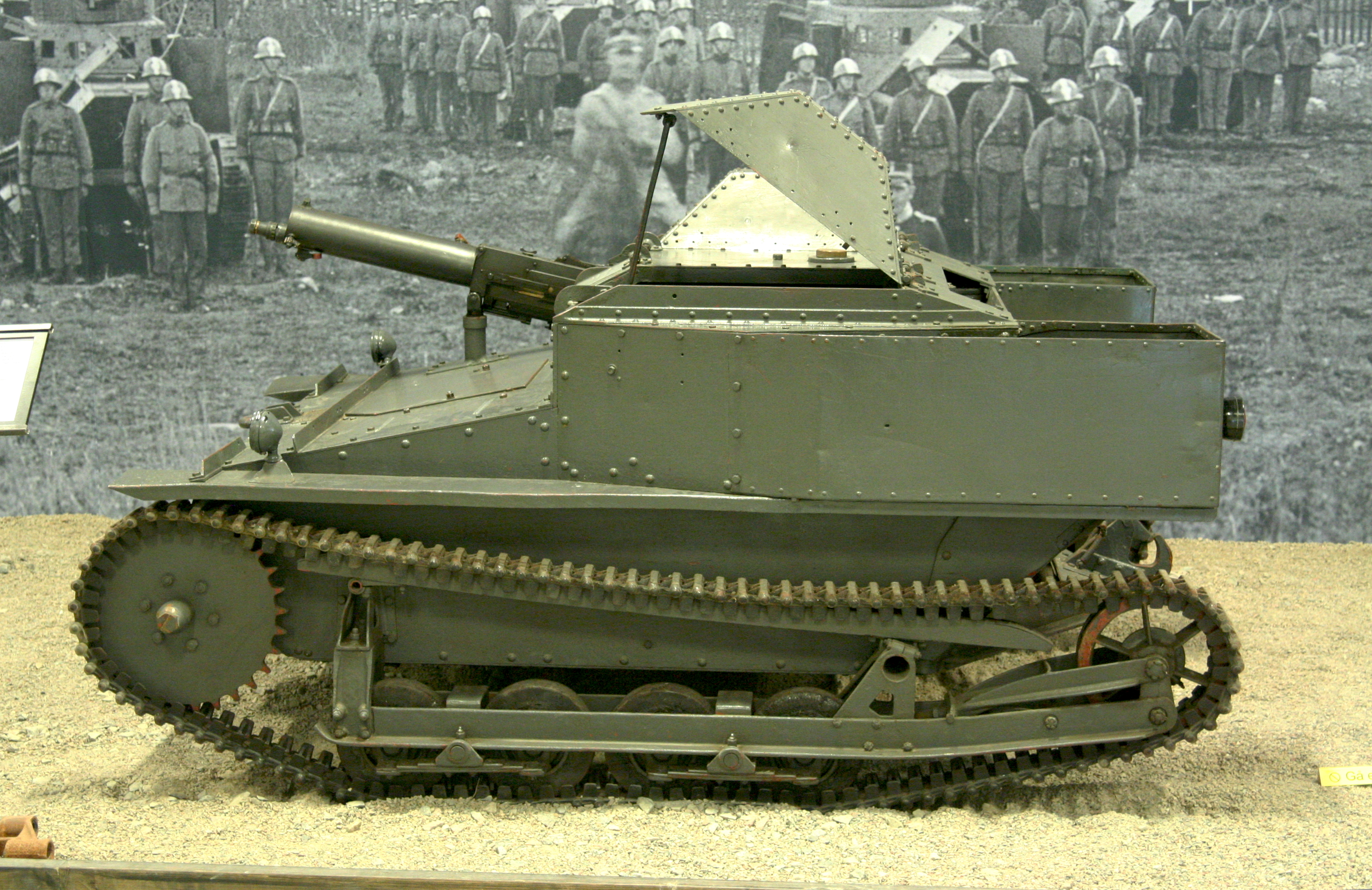
A Carden-Loyd tankette Mark VI

The Fiat 3000 was the first tank to be produced in series in Italy. It was to be the standard tank of the emerging Italian armored units after World War I. The 3000 was based on the French Renault FT. The design was accepted with deliveries to begin in May 1919, but the end of the war caused the original order to be cancelled and only 100 were delivered. The first Fiat 3000s entered service in 1921 and were officially designated as the carro d'assalto Fiat 3000, Mod. 21. ("Fiat 3000 assault tank, Model 21"). Tests of the Model 21 revealed that the armament, consisting of two 6.5 mm machine guns, was inadequate, and adoption of a 37 mm gun as main armament was urged.

The up-gunned version of the Fiat 3000, armed with a 37/40 gun, was tested in 1929 and was officially adopted in 1930 with the designation of carro d'assalto Fiat 3000, Mod. 30. The Model 30, in addition to its improved armament, also differed from the Model 21 in that it had a more powerful engine, improved suspension, different engine compartment silhouette, and the external stores were stowed differently. Some Model 30s were also produced with two 6.5 mm machine guns as main armament, as on the Model 21, in lieu of the 37 mm gun. A limited number of Model 21 vehicles were exported to Albania, Latvia and Abyssinia (Ethiopia) prior to 1930.

The L3/35 was developed from the Carden Loyd Mark VI tankette, four of which were imported from Britain in 1929. The first vehicle developed by the Italians from the Carden Lloyd tankette was designated CV-29; "CV" being an abbreviation of Carro Veloce (Italian: "fast tank") and "29" as the year of adoption. Only twenty-one CV-29s were built.

In 1933, a new design was built jointly by the Fiat Company of Turin and the Ansaldo Company of Genoa. This vehicle was introduced as the Fiat-Ansaldo CV-33 light tank and was only armed with two machine guns and was in wide use at the beginning of the war in Africa. About 300 CV-33s were built.

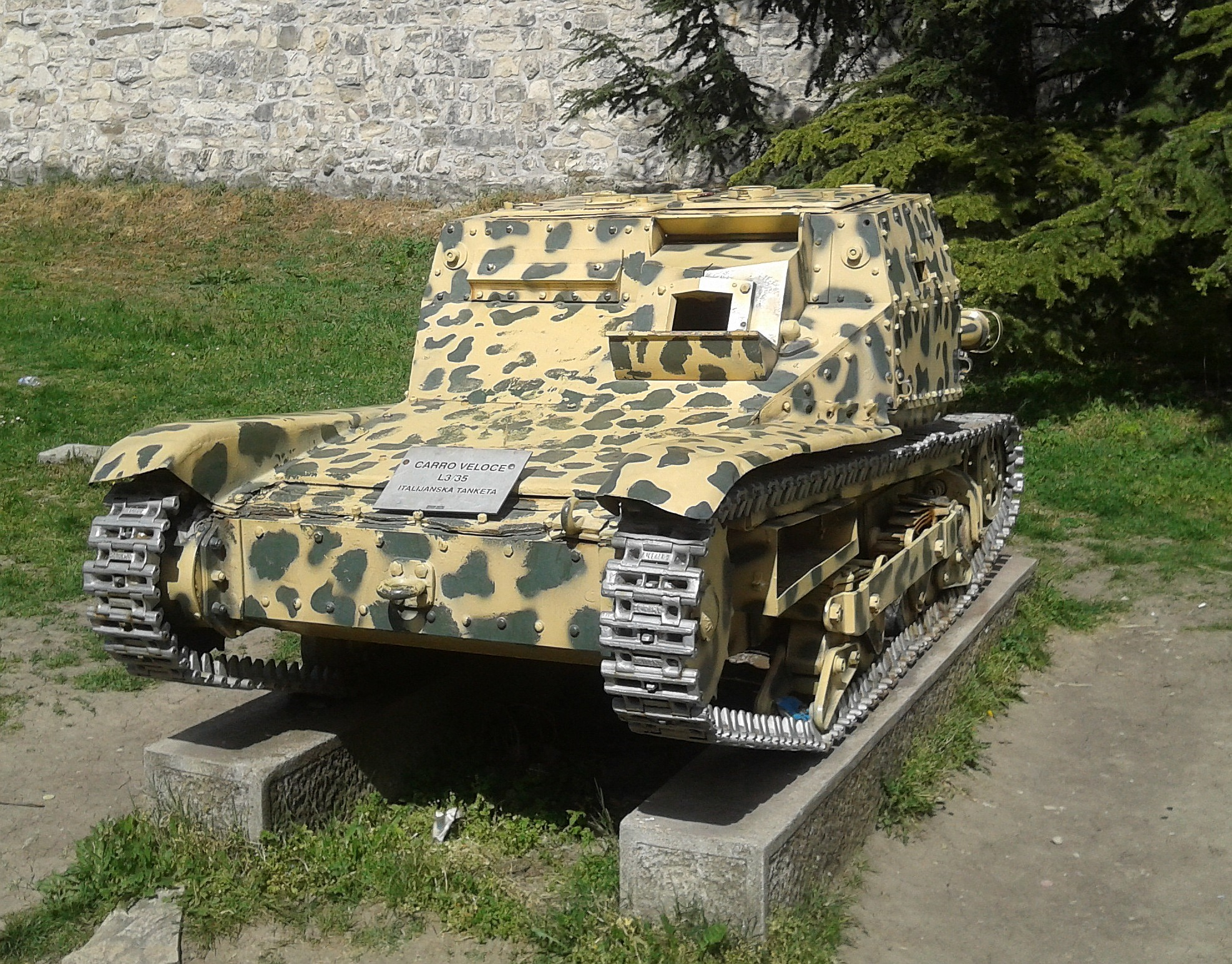
L3/35 on display at the Military Museum, Belgrade

In 1935, a slightly improved model of the CV-33 was introduced and designated CV-35. The primary differences were that the armour was bolted rather than riveted and the single 6.5 mm machine gun was replaced with twin 8 mm machine guns. Many older CV-33s were retrofitted to meet the specifications of the CV-35. In 1938, the vehicles were redesignated L3/33 ("L" for Leggero or 'light') and the L3/35.

In 1938, a further development of the L3 design was designated L3/38. The L3/38 had torsion bar suspension and two versions of a single mounted 13.2 mm machine gun.

The designations of these tanks were changed prior to the outbreak of World War II, in accordance with the identification system that was adopted throughout the war by the Italians. The Model 21 was redesignated the L.5/21, and the Model 30 was redesignated the L.5/30 becoming the L5/21 and L5/30 light tank respectively.

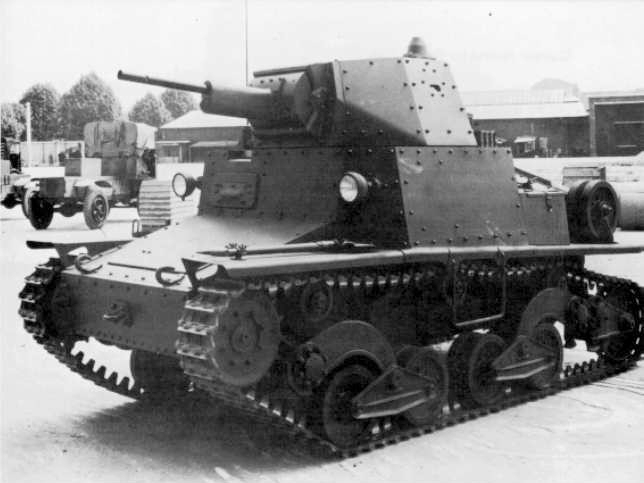
Fiat-Ansaldo L6/40 tank in 1940

The L6/40 light tank was developed prior to World War II and used by the Italian army from 1940 and on and was adopted by the Italian Army when officials learned of the design and expressed interest. A one-man turret in the center mounted a single Breda Modello 35 20 mm main gun and a Breda Modello 38 8 mm coaxial machine gun. The driver sat in the front right of the hull. The riveted armor was six to 30 mm in thickness, which was roughly equivalent to existing Allied light tanks. A further development of the Fiat L3 light tank, the L6 went through a number of prototypes during the late 1930s. The first was armed with a sponson-mounted 37 mm main gun and a machine-gun armed turret. Ultimately, the production configuration, named Carro Armato L6/40, was put into production in 1939, with 283 finally produced. It was the main tank employed by the Italian forces fighting on the Eastern Front alongside the L6/40-based Semovente 47/32 self-propelled gun. L6/40s were also used in the North African campaign.

The M11/39 medium tank was first produced prior to World War II. The need for a medium infantry tank led FIAT to design a brand new hull in 1938. Army specifications included a 37mm gun, two machine-guns and a good armor. The M11/39 had strong influences from the British Vickers Matilda I and Cruiser I. There was no turret design strong enough to support the designed M40 37mm gun, and the latter had to be fitted in the hull; the light turret was equipped with a twin Breda 8mm. For the first time, this was a three-man crew design. The armour was 30mm thick, and the engine was a 105 bhp V6 diesel, sufficient to a 32 km/h max speed and 200 km range. It was an 11-ton model, hence its denomination. The M11/39, which saw service in Africa and Italy (1939–1944), was developed as a "breakthrough tank" (Carro di Rottura). The design of the M11/39 was influenced by the British Vickers 6-Ton. This influence is reflected particularly in the track and suspension design. One innovative aspect of the design was the placement of the final reduction gears inside the front-mounted drive sprockets, eliminating the need for enlarged final drive housings in the bow armor. However, it was relatively slow, its mechanical reliability was very poor, and its 30 mm maximum riveted steel armor, designed to withstand only 20 mm fire, was vulnerable to British 2-pounder guns at any range at which the M11/39s main gun was useful.

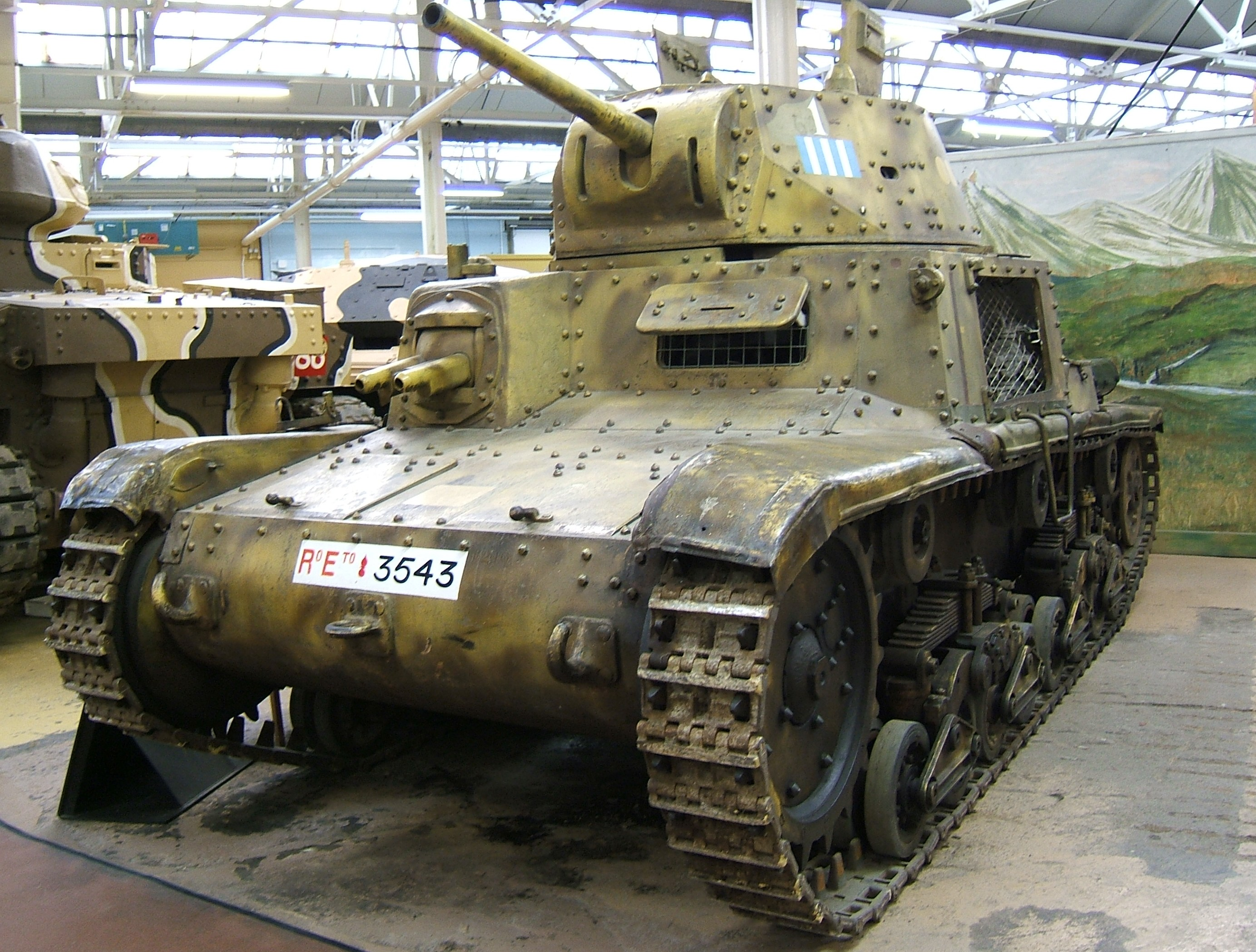
M13/40 at the Bovington Tank Museum in Dorset

The Carro Armato M13/40 was the Italian tank designed to replace the Fiat L3, the Fiat L6/40 and the Fiat M11/39 in the Italian Army at the start of World War II. The M13/40, weighing 13-14 tons, was fitted with a 47 mm gun, having armor-piercing capabilities, in the turret and a four-men crew. After a single prototype, series production began in late 1940. The late production (by 1941) had a 42 mm armour, similar to the next model, the almost identical M14/41. It was the main tank the Italians used throughout the war. The design was influenced by the British Vickers 6-Ton and was based on the modified chassis of the earlier M11/39, whose production was cut short in order to get the M13/40 into production.

The M14/41 was a four-person medium tank that served from 1941 and was first employed in the North African Campaign. The M14/41 was a slightly improved version of the M13/40 with a more powerful diesel engine. It was produced in limited numbers as it was considered already obsolete by the time of its introduction. The M14/41 used the same chassis as the M13/40 but with a redesigned hull with better armor, and was manufactured in 1941 and 1942. Nearly 800 were produced by the time production ended.

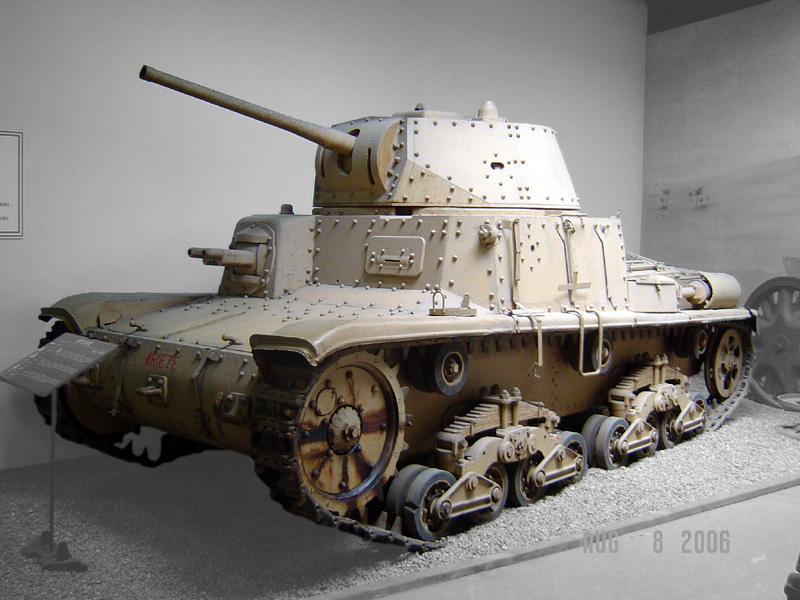
M15/42 on display at the Musée des Blindés in Saumur

The M15/42 was a medium tank whose production began on 1 January 1943. 90 had been built before the Armistice of 8 September 1943. Having occupied most of the Italian territory, Germany confiscated all remaining M15/42s and produced 28 incomplete M15/42s. The M15/42 was developed from the M13/40 and the M14/41. It had a more powerful engine and air filters to cope with the harsh conditions of the desert. Basic armament was one 47 mm / L40 main gun and four 8 mm Breda 38 machine guns.

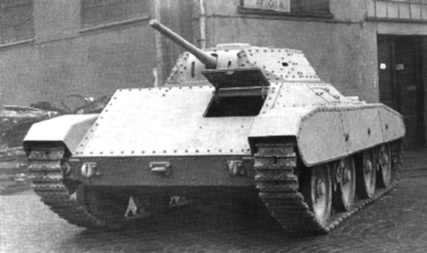
M16/43 Celere Sahariano

By 1942 the Italian army tried to develop a true "cruiser tank". This could only be achieved with a Christie style suspensions system. This led to the M16/43, better known as the Carro Celere Sahariano, which bears some resemblance to the British Crusader. It had a low profile, long hull, and the same armament as the M15/42, and a powerful FIAT SPA (275 hp). It was capable of a sustained speed of 71 km/h (44 mph) but came too late. Production was cancelled when the Axis forces were driven out of Tunisia.

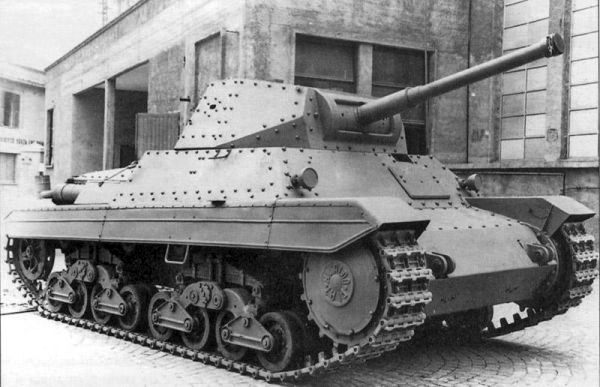
P26/40 medium tank in Fiat-Ansaldo factory

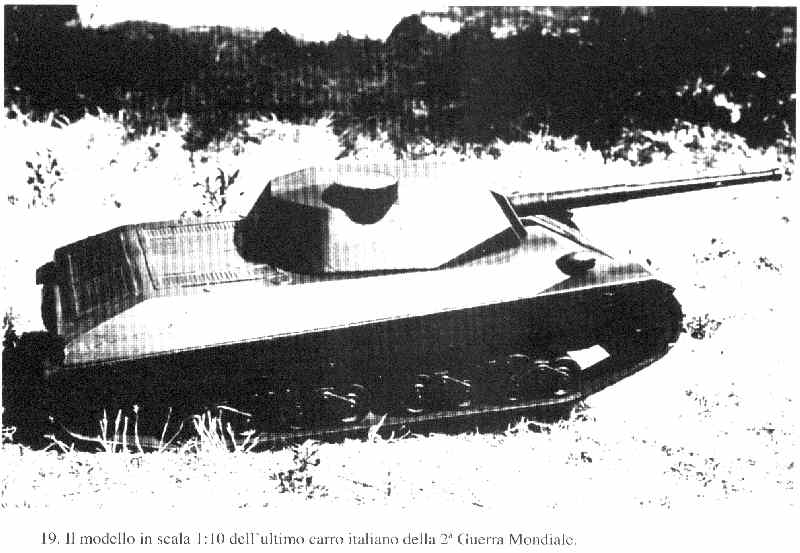
Model of P43 bis

The first real tank to be able to take on the allies modern tanks was the P26/40 armed with a 75 mm gun and an 8 mm Breda machine gun. The design of the P26/40 "heavy" tank had started in 1940 but very few had been built by the time Italy signed the armistice with the Allies in September 1943 and the few produced afterwards were used by the Germans. The turret was operated by two crew members and this was a significant drawback as it put excessive workload on the tank's commander as most new tanks were designed with three-man turrets, following the successful example of the German Panzer III. The main weapon was the 75/34 cannon, a development of the Model 37 divisional gun (34 calibres long), retaining the same dimensions. This weapon had a muzzle velocity of around 700 m/s (2,300 ft/s). The P26/40 originally fielded three machine guns, but one was removed along with the deletion of the frontal, dual barbette machine gun mount.

The mechanical systems were a development of the "M" series, in particular the suspension which was reliable, but in rough terrain would not allow speeds similar to the more modern Christie suspension or torsion bar suspension. Nevertheless, the good power-to-weight ratio represented a significant improvement in mobility over its predecessors.

The armour was still riveted at a time when most tanks were constructed by welding. The armor was capable of protecting the tank against early anti-tank guns such as the British QF 2-pounder (40 mm, 1.6 in), but was vulnerable to 1943 anti-tank weapons such as the British QF 6-pounder (57 mm, 2.24 in) and QF 17 pounder (76 mm, 3 in). The P40 was designated as a heavy tank in Italy, not because of its weight, but because of the intended role: it was to accompany and support the widely used medium ("M") tanks on the battlefields.

There was a P26/43 being developed with a 420 hp engine called the 'P43 bis', with a gun was the same as the P.26, the 75/34 mm cannon, but never got past the first models.

The Semovente line of self-propelled gun was developed with the Semovente da 47/32 using a 47 mm gun and a Semovente da 75/18 with a 75 mm Obice da 75/18 modello 34 mountain gun on the chassis of older tanks such as the M13/40 and M14/41 chassis from 1941 to 1943, later using the M15/42 chassis. The Semovente da 75/18 was one of the first of the self-propelled tanks and was used in North Africa in many actions and in later in Italy.

== World War I ==
During World War I, Italy did not field armoured units for the most part until near the end of the war, due to a lack of tanks. Over 100 of the FT-17 tanks and 20 of the Schneider CA tanks were sent by France to Italy in 1918. The only other solution at the time was to begin production of original designs.

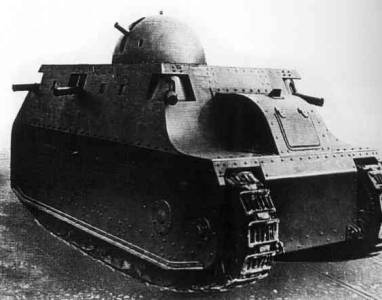
Fiat 2000; it was one of the largest designs of its time

The order to design and produce the first Italian tanks was accepted by the FIAT automobile company in 1916. The Fiat 2000 - Model 17 was conceived by Fiat as a private venture in October 1916 and some feel the finest heavy tank built in WW1. The first prototype was ready in June 1917. Fiat donated 2 tanks to the Italian Army in February 1918 but the Fiat 2000 never saw combat. Total production until the end of 1919 encompassed 6 vehicles. The prototype of the new tank was displayed to a military commission on 21 June 1917; its mechanical systems were complete but its superstructure was added later, being represented on the prototype by a wooden mockup with a conical open turret and dummy gun. The final configuration of the superstructure was not completed until 1918. The Fiat 2000 was a substantial vehicle, of comparable dimensions to the British Mark V tanks, and weighing 40 tons as compared to the Mark V's 28 tons.

After the war the Fiat 2000 was displayed as one of the weapons used 'to defeat the enemy' and the two prototypes completed were sent to Libya to fight guerrilla forces, together with other tanks bought from France, in a special unit, the Tank battery (1° Batteria autonoma carri d'assalto).

In Libya, the Fiat 2000 tank was deployed to Pacification of Libya against Omar Mukhtar's Senussi resistance; it proved capable of an average speed of 4 km/h, and so, after two months its career ended, being unable to keep up with rapid movement of the enemy. One remained in Tripoli and the other was sent to Italy in the spring of 1919, where it performed before the King at Rome Stadium. The tank put on a convincing display: it climbed a 1.1 m wall, then faced another 3.5 m wall, which it knocked down with its weight. Then a trench of 3 m width was successfully crossed and several trees were knocked down. This impressive performance failed to revive interest in the heavy tank and so it was abandoned.

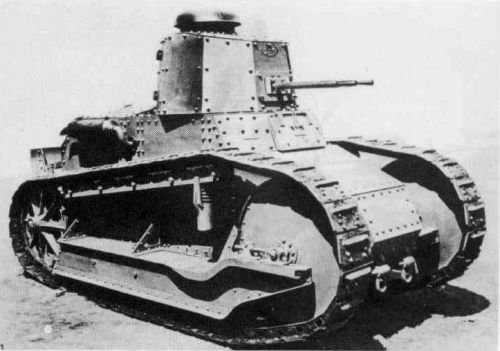
The carro d'assalto Fiat 3000, Mod. 21

The Fiat 3000, whose design was based on that of the French Renault FT-17, was the first tank to be produced in series in Italy. It was to be the standard tank of the emerging Italian armored units in World War 1. Although 1400 units were ordered, with deliveries to begin in May 1919, the end of the war caused the original order to be cancelled, only 100 were delivered. The first Fiat 3000s entered service in 1921 and were officially designated as the carro d'assalto Fiat 3000, Mod. 21.

== Interwar period ==
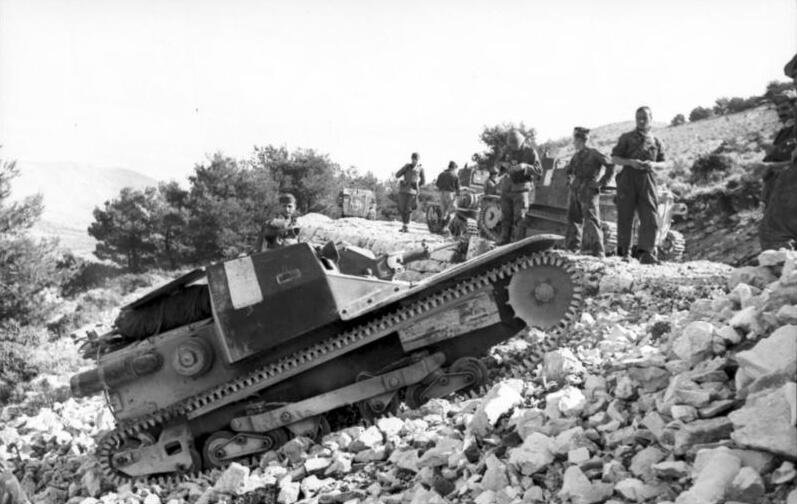
L3/33 tank in Greece

After World War I, Italy began to develop its own tanks from imported ones and of its own designs. So the Italian army was mainly equipped with tankettes of the L3 series in the 1930s, and these, armed with machine guns, formed the main armor strength of Italy as late as 1940. Italy began fielding heavier tanks beginning with the Fiat M11/39 with a 37 mm main gun in 1940. This tank and its derivatives, the M13/40, M14/41 and the M15/42 (all with 47 mm main guns) were closely comparable in combat power to light tanks such as the Soviet T-26.

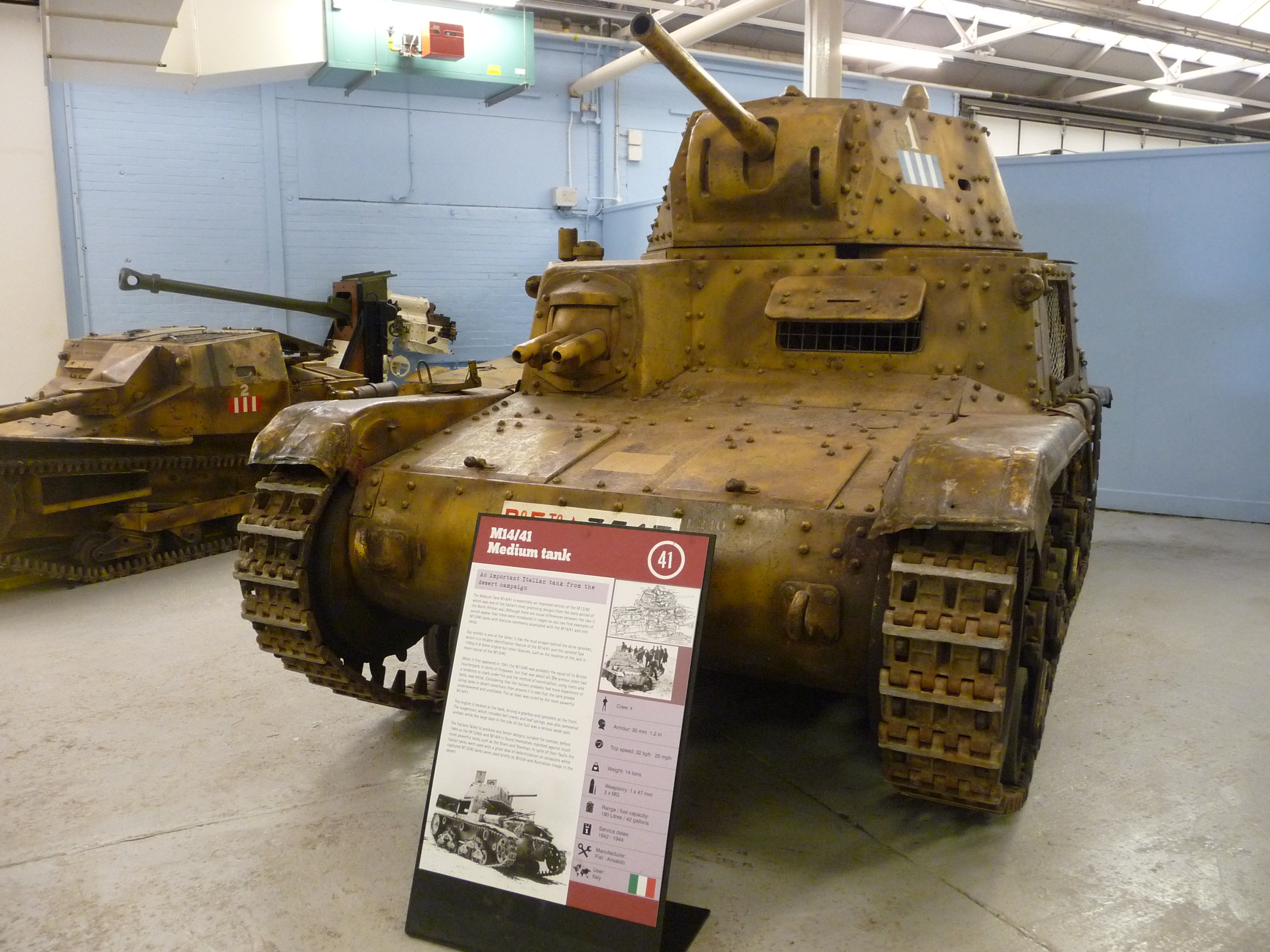
Fiat M14/41 tank

The Carro Armato M13/40 was the successor of the M11/39 (only 100 built). Ordered for the Italian army in January 1940, it was in service from September 1940 in North Africa.

The M13/40 had a similar chassis like the M11/39 but a redesigned hull of riveted construction varying in thickness. The driver was seated at the front of the hull on the left with the machine-gunner to his right; the latter operated the twin Modello 38 8-mm (0.315-in) machine-guns and the two-man turret with the 47-mm 32-calibre gun was in the center of the hull, with the commander/gunner and the loader operating it. A Modello 38 8-mm (0.315-in) machine-gun was mounted co-axial with the main armament and a similar weapon was mounted on the turret roof for anti-aircraft defense.

The Carro Armato M14/41 was essentially the M13/40 fitted with a more powerful diesel engine which was equipped with air filters designed to cope with the harsh conditions of the desert. Production amounted to 1,103 of these vehicles, which had a similar specification to the M13/40 except for an increase in speed to 33 km/h (20 mph) and in weight to 14.5 tonnes.

The M14/41 was a slightly improved version of the earlier Fiat M13/40 with a more powerful diesel engine. It was produced in limited numbers as it was considered already obsolete by the time of its introduction. The M14/41 used the same chassis as the M13/40 but with a redesigned hull with better armor. The M14/41 was manufactured in 1941 and 1942. Nearly 800 were produced by the time production ended.

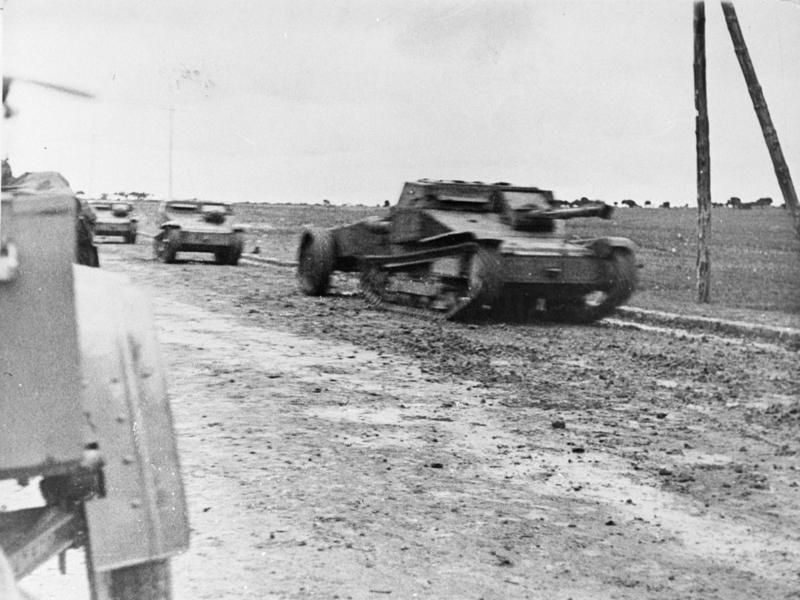
Italian tankettes advancing with a flame thrower tank in the lead at the Battle of Guadalajara, in the Spanish Civil War

A heavier design, the Carro Armato P40 with a 75 mm main gun, was designed, but saw no service with Italian forces as it became ready at the time of the Italian Armistice with the Allies, after which the Germans took them over. The few produced after the Italian surrender were used by the Germans. The P40 design had firepower comparable to Allied and German medium tanks but was far lighter and thus less well armored. The Fiat 3000 (Model 21) was first used in action in February 1926 in Libya, and subsequently also saw action against the Ethiopians in the Second Italo-Abyssinian War in 1935. The Italians did not employ any of these tanks in Spain during the Spanish Civil War, however.

The combat history of the L3s tankettes during the interwar period was not good. On at least two occasions during the Italian invasion in Ethiopia, Ethiopian Christmas Offensive, L3s were put out of action by massed infantry attacks. In Spain, L3s of the Corps of Volunteer Troops (Corpo Truppe Volontarie, or CTV) were totally out-classed by the T-26 and BT-5 tanks provided to the Republican forces by the Soviet Union. Benito Mussolini decided that Fascist Italian forces should lead a fourth offensive on Madrid. This Italian offensive resulted in the Battle of Guadalajara. The battle ended as a decisive victory for the Republican forces. In contrast, the Italian forces suffered heavy losses. The Italian armor, consisting for the most part of L3/35 tankettes, proved to be no match for the tanks provided to the Republicans by the Soviet Union.

The L3s were not a factor in the brief war between Hungary and Slovakia, which fielded some of them.

== World War II ==
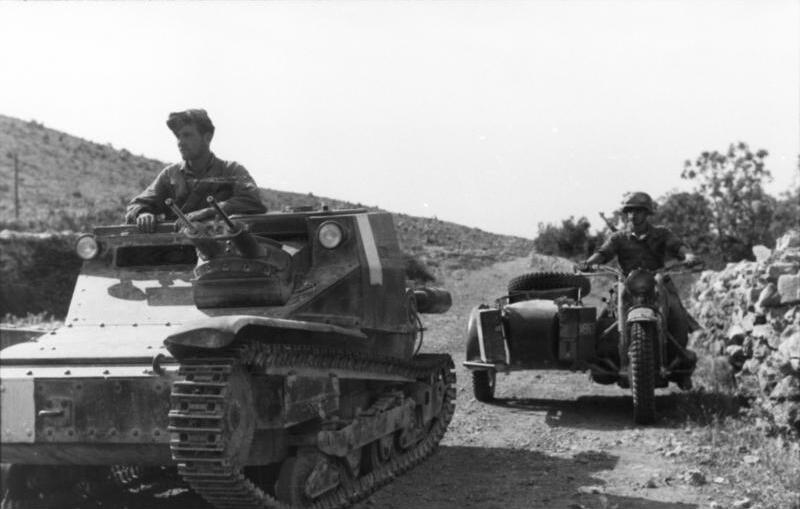
Italian L3/35 in the Balkans, August 1943

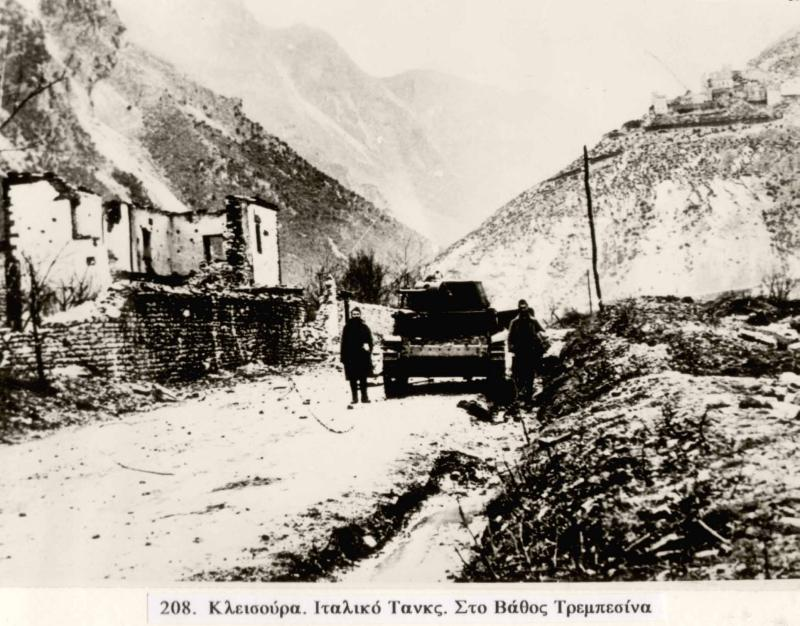
Italian tank captured by Greek soldiers in the Balkans

The Fiat 3000s that were first upgraded and officially designated as the carro d'assalto Fiat 3000 Mod.21, or Carro Armato L5/21 and the later upgrade the up-gunned version of the 3000, armed with a 37/40 gun, was tested in 1929 and was officially adopted in 1930 with the designation of carro d'assalto Fiat 3000, Mod. 30 or L5/30 light tank still were in use when World War II started. With Italy's entry into World War II in June 1940, a limited number of Fiat 3000s still in service with the Italian Army were employed operationally on the Greek-Albanian front. They were also among the last Italian tanks to oppose the Allies, as in July 1943, when the Allies landed in Sicily, two Italian tank companies on the island were still equipped with the 3000. One company was dug in and their vehicles were used as fixed fortifications, while the other company was used in a mobile role at the Amphibious Battle of Gela, with few of the tanks surviving the Allied drive.

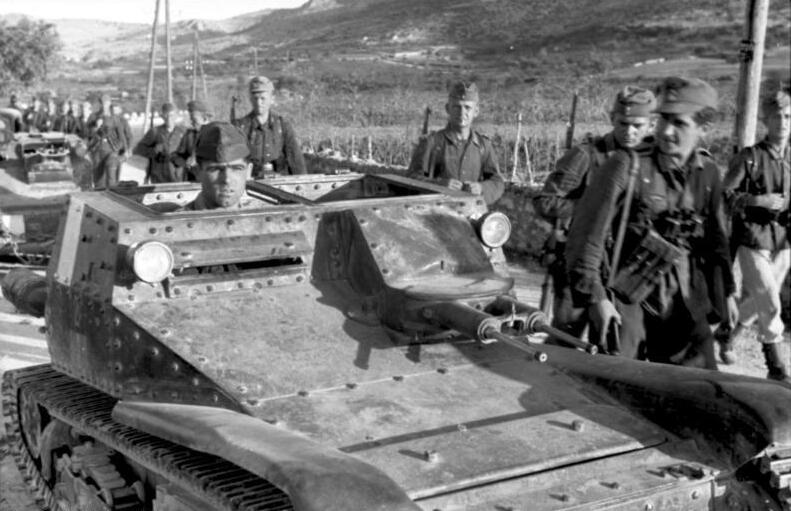
Close-up of Italian L3/35 in the Balkans, August 1943

In addition to seeing action in the Second Italo-Abyssinian War, the Second Sino-Japanese War, the Spanish Civil War, the Slovak-Hungarian War, and the Anglo-Iraqi War, the L3 tank was used almost everywhere that Italian troops fought during World War II. L3s were found on the Italian/French border, North Africa, Italian East Africa, the Balkans, USSR, Sicily, and Italy.

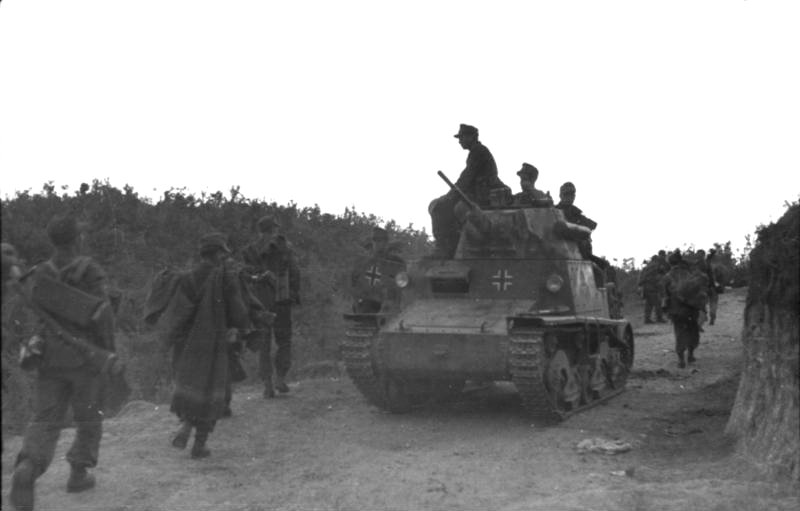
An L6/40 tank with German markings passes German infantrymen in occupied Albania, September 1943

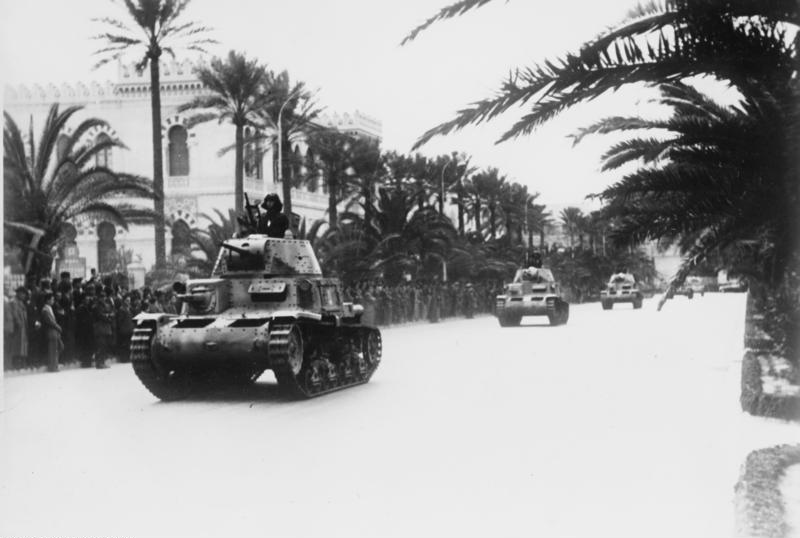
Italian M13/40 tanks on the streets of Tripoli, March 1941

A further development of the Fiat L3 light tank, the Fiat L6/40 went through a number of prototypes during the late 1930s and used the Italian army from 1940 and on through World War II. The L6/40 light tanks were used by the Italians in the Balkans Campaign, in the war against the Soviet Union, in the latter stages of the North African campaign, and in the defense of Sicily and Italy. The L6/40 was the main tank employed by the Italian forces fighting on the Eastern Front. The L6 fought alongside the L6/40-based Semovente 47/32 self-propelled gun. Although a good light tank for its size and an improvement over the tankettes that were common within the Italian army, it was already obsolete by the time of its introduction.

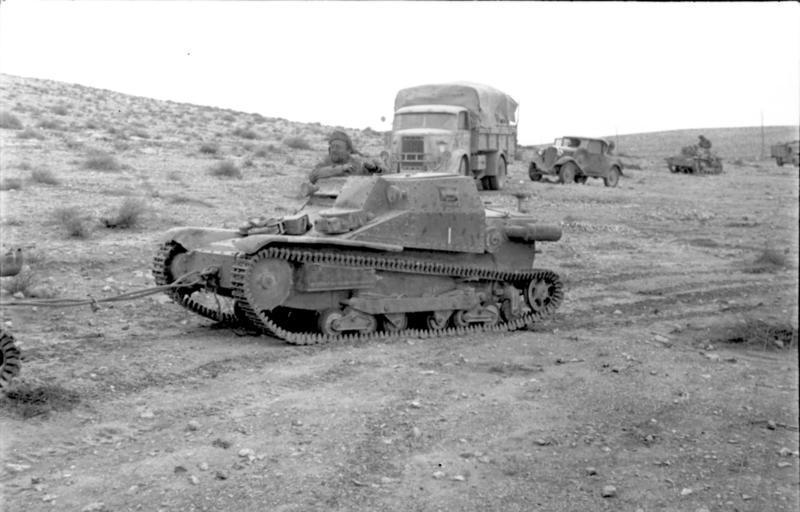
Italian L3/33 tankettes

On paper, the Royal Italian Army was one of the largest ground forces in World War II, though in reality it could not field the numbers claimed. Italian 'medium' M11, M13, M14 and M15 tanks were at a marked disadvantage against the comparatively heavily armed American Sherman tanks, for example. More crucially, Italy lacked suitable quantities of equipment of all kinds and the Italian high command did not take necessary steps to plan for possible setbacks on the battlefield, or for proper logistical support to its field armies. There were too few anti-aircraft weapons, obsolete anti-tank guns, and too few trucks.

When Italy entered World War II, the Royal Italian Army (Regio Esercito) possessed around one-hundred M11/39 medium tanks in two tank battalions. L3 tankettes still equipped all three Italian armored divisions, they equipped the tank battalions in the motorized divisions, the light tank squadron group in each "Fast" (Celere) division, and numerous independent tank battalions.

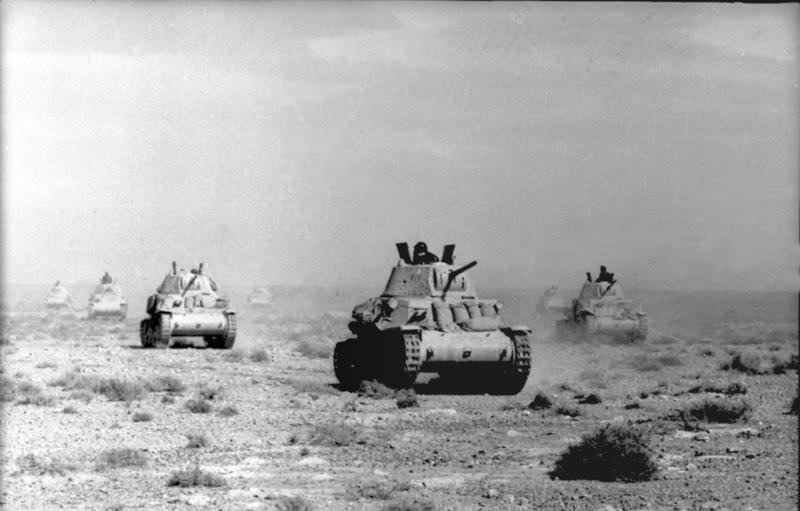
M13/40 tanks in the desert, April 1941

The Fiat-Ansaldo M11/39 medium tank was used from 1940 through the early period of World War II. The M11/39 was developed as a "breakthrough tank" (Carro di Rottura). It was replaced by the Fiat-Ansaldo M13/40 medium tank which was used in the Greek campaign and in the North African Campaign. The first of over 700 M13/40s were delivered following a rate of production of about 60-70 a month, before the fall of 1940. They were sent to North Africa to fight the British. Its baptism of fire came with a special unit, the Babini Brigade. Arriving too late to fight in the September offensive, this unit was ready the next December, for a major British offensive operation. Further action took place in Derna, where the V battalion had just arrived. Tanks of III battalion were also present near this position, at the battle of Bardia. In two days of fighting (January 3–4, 1941), the Australians suffered 456 casualties while the Italians lost 45,000 men captured or killed. On February 6–7, the British offensive penetrated so far that the Babini Brigade sought to open a breach in the British lines at Beda Fomm in an effort to allow cut-off Italian troops to retreat along the Libyan coast. The brigade's action was unsuccessful and all 20 of their tanks were lost. The last six surviving tanks entered a field near the local British command post. They were destroyed one after another by a single 2-pdr (40 mm) anti-tank gun. Many tanks were lost in this campaign to artillery fire rather than other tanks. Subsequently, in April 1941, M13s of the Ariete division took part in the Siege of Tobruk, with little success against British Matildas. The first successful action for the M13 was the Battle of Bir-el-Gubi. The tank was widely used in North Africa by the Italian army and some that were captured by the British army were subsequently issued to the British 6th Royal Tank Regiment (RTR) and the Australian 6th Cavalry Regiment early in 1941 when tanks were in a very short supply on the Allied side. The Australian regiment had three squadrons of captured vehicles which they called Dingo, Rabbit, and Wombat. So that they were not engaged by Allied units, white kangaroos were painted on the sides, glacis and turret rear.

The M13/40 was not used on the Eastern Front; Italian forces there were equipped only with Fiat L6/40s and Semovente 47/32 tank destroyers. Armament was sufficient for 1940–41, but did not keep up with the increased armor and firepower on Allied or German tanks and anti-tank guns. Beginning in 1942, the Italian Army recognized the firepower weakness of the M13/40 series and employed the Semovente 75/18 self-propelled gun alongside the tanks in their armored units.

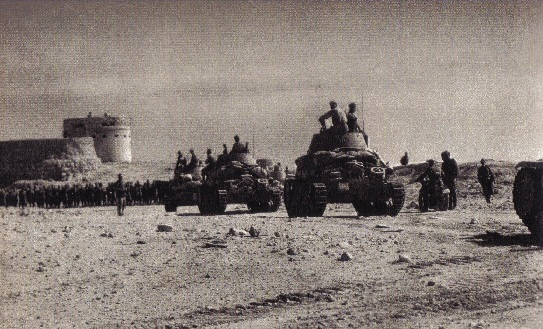
Italian tanks in action in Libya

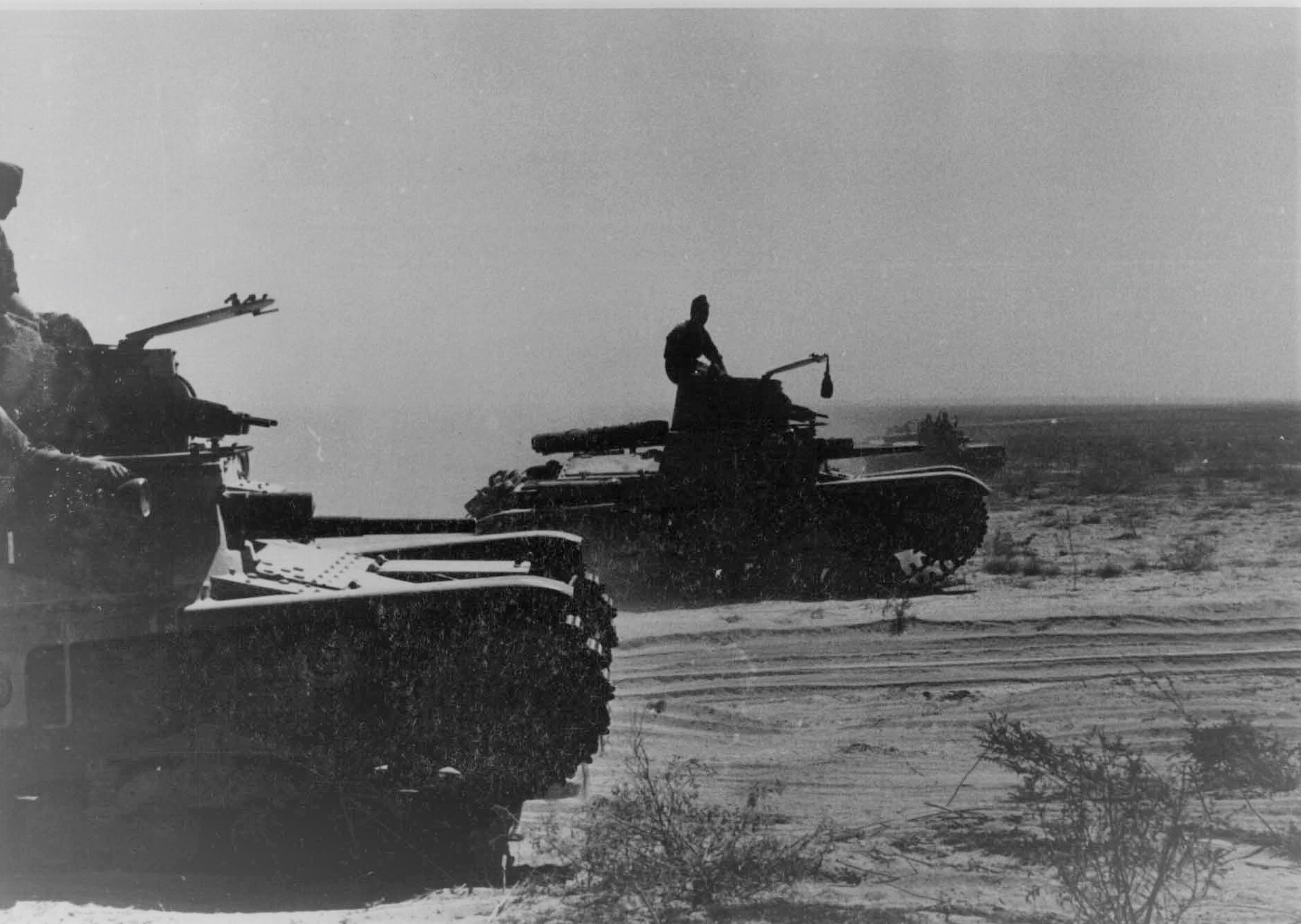
Italian armor in the Battle of Sidi Barrani

In April 1941, at the time of the arrival of the Afrika Korps, the Italians had around 240 M13 and M14 tanks in first-line service. In 1942, as the Allies began deploying Grants and Crusader IIIs, along with towed 6-pounder anti-tank guns in their infantry units, the weaknesses of the M13 were exposed. In an attempt to improve protection, many crews piled sandbags or extra track links on the outside of their tanks, but this made the already-underpowered vehicles even slower and increased maintenance requirements. The Italians equipped at least one company in each tank battalion with more heavily armed Semovente 75/18 assault guns.

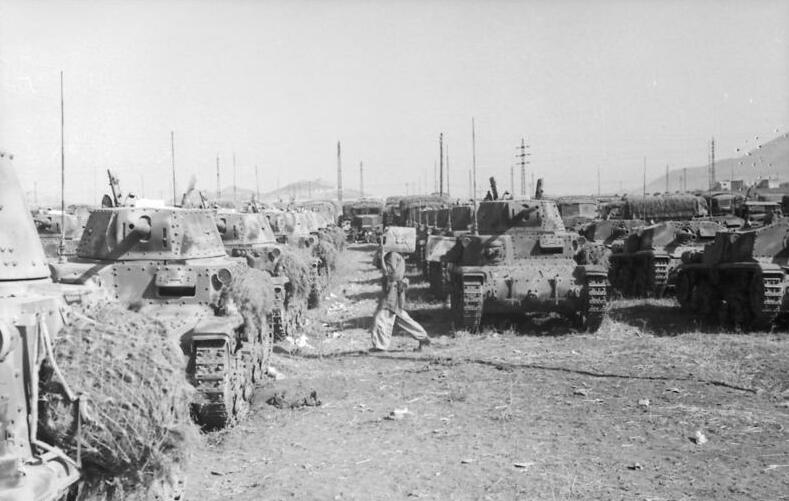
Italian M14/41 tanks in depot, September 1943

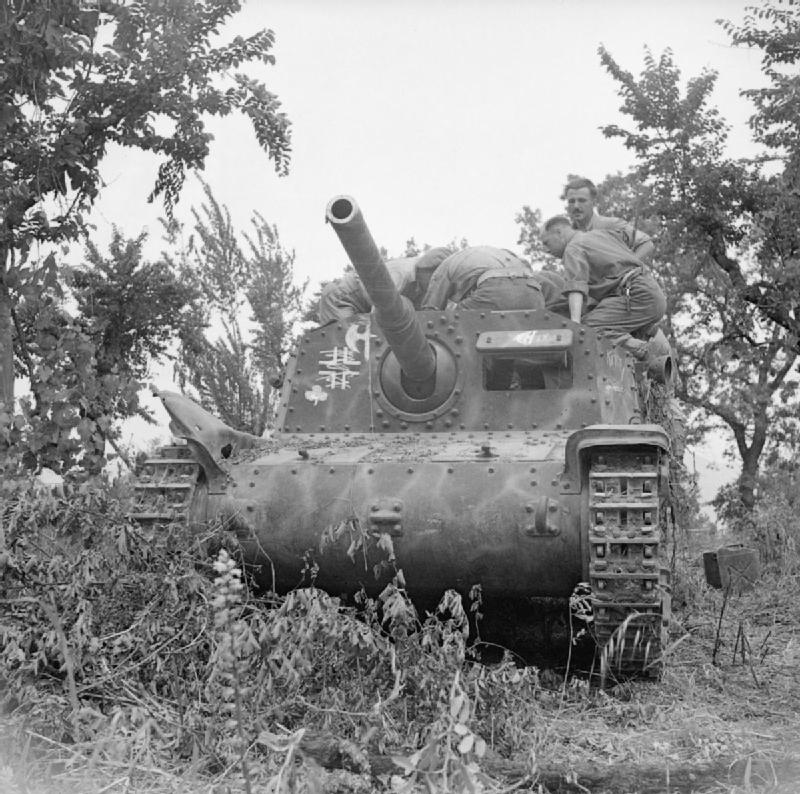
British troops with a captured Semovente self-propelled gun in German service, 19 May 1944

The Second Battle of El Alamein saw the first appearance of the M4 Sherman, while some 230 M13s were still in front line service. In several days of battle, the Ariete and Littorio divisions were used to cover the Axis retreat. The 131st Armored Division "Centauro" was virtually destroyed fighting in Tunisia.

The next tank in the series was the M14/41, a slightly improved version of the M13/40 with a more powerful diesel engine. The tank was also employed in the North African Campaign. The M14/41 was a four-person medium tank and served starting in 1941 in the Royal Italian Army. The official Italian designation was Carro Armato M 14/41 and the tank was first employed in the North African Campaign where its shortcomings quickly became apparent. The vehicle was unreliable, cramped, and caught fire easily when hit. Following the withdrawal of Italian forces from North Africa the M14/41 was rarely encountered. A few captured M11, M13 and M14s were pressed into service by British and Australian forces to fill the serious shortage of allied tanks in 1941.

The next in the series was the M15/42, a 15 tonne tank first built in January 1943. The M15/42 was developed from the M13/40 and the M14/41. It had a more powerful engine and air filters to cope with the harsh conditions of the desert. The M.15/42 was armed with a 47mm main gun and up to four Modello type 8mm machine guns in various places throughout the design with 6 road wheels fitted to either track side. Power was derived from a single SPA 15 TB M42 8-cylinder gasoline engine - developing some 192 hp - and mounted to the rear of the hull. Some 90 vehicles were built before the Italian armistice in September 1943 and in connection to that event they were used in battle against the Germans by the 132nd Armoured Division Ariete in Rome. After that point they were confiscated and used by the Germans, along with 28 incomplete M15/42s. The Germans ordered the completion of the remaining 28, but incorporated a slightly improved version of the 47 mm gun.

The Carro Armato M16/43 was cancelled before the single prototype was completed after Axis were expelled from North Africa so never was used in the war.

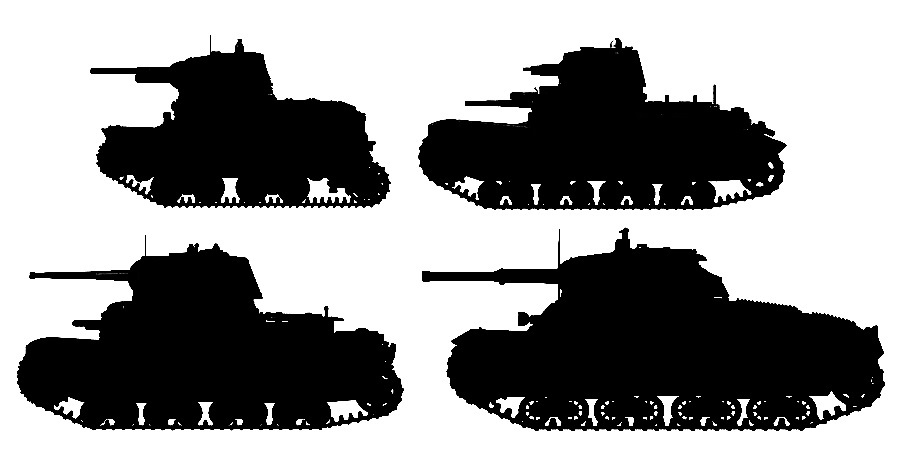
Tanks operated by Italy during WW2

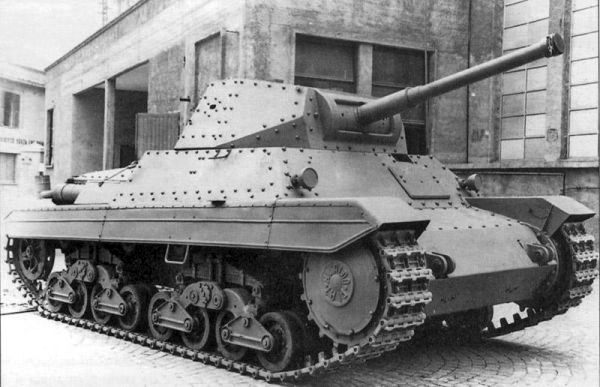
Italian Carro Armato P 26/40 tank

In September 1943, Italy made an armistice with the Allies and split into the Italian Social Republic - effectively a puppet state of Germany - in the north and that of the Badoglio government in the south. The Italian Co-Belligerent Army (Esercito Cobelligerante Italiano) was the army of the Italian royalist forces fighting on the side of the Allies in southern Italy after the Allied armistice with Italy in September 1943. The Carro Armato P40 came late in the war and was armed with a 75 mm gun and an 8 mm Breda machine gun, plus another optional machine gun in an anti-aircraft mount. Of the 1,200 tanks ordered, only a few (between one and five depending on the source) pre-production models were completed before the Italian Armistice in September 1943, at which point they were taken over by the German Wehrmacht. About a hundred P40s were built by Ansaldo from then until the end of the war, although most were not entirely completed because of a lack of engines. A few were used in combat, under the German designation of Panzerkampfwagen P40 737(i), for example at Anzio. Some, without engines, were used as static strongpoints.

There were at least two planned variants of the P40. One was named P43, a tank with a weight over 30 tonnes, which would have had about 100mm of frontal armour and a main armament of either a longer-barrelled 75 mm gun or the same 90 mm piece mounted on the Semovente M41 90/53. However of this variant only a couple wooden scale models were ever produced. There was also a further upgraded variant called the P43 bis which was planned to have a 480 hp gasoline engine.

== Cold War ==
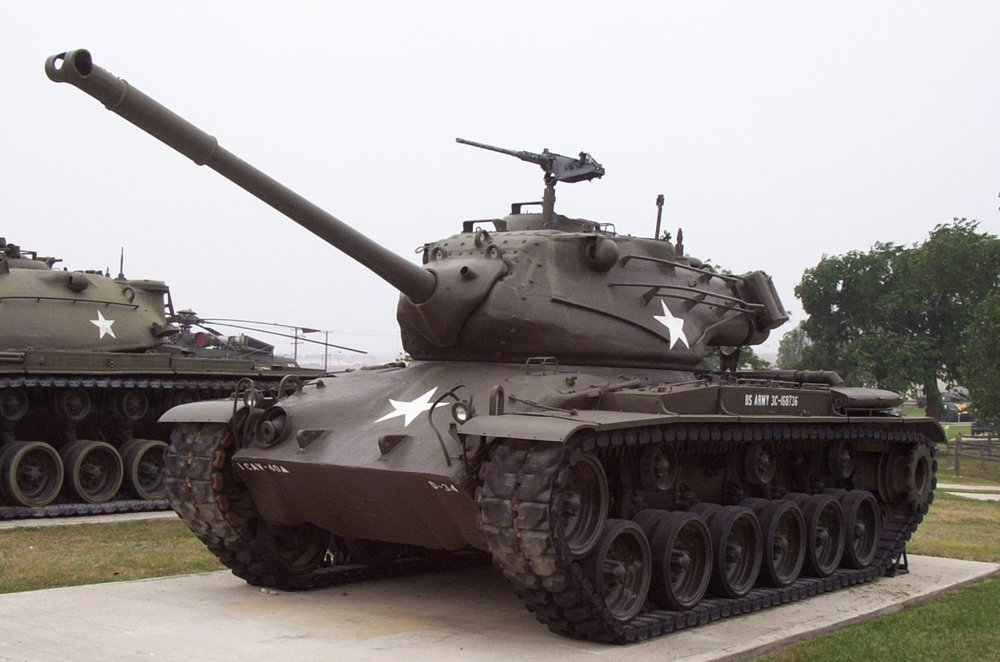
M-47 Patton II

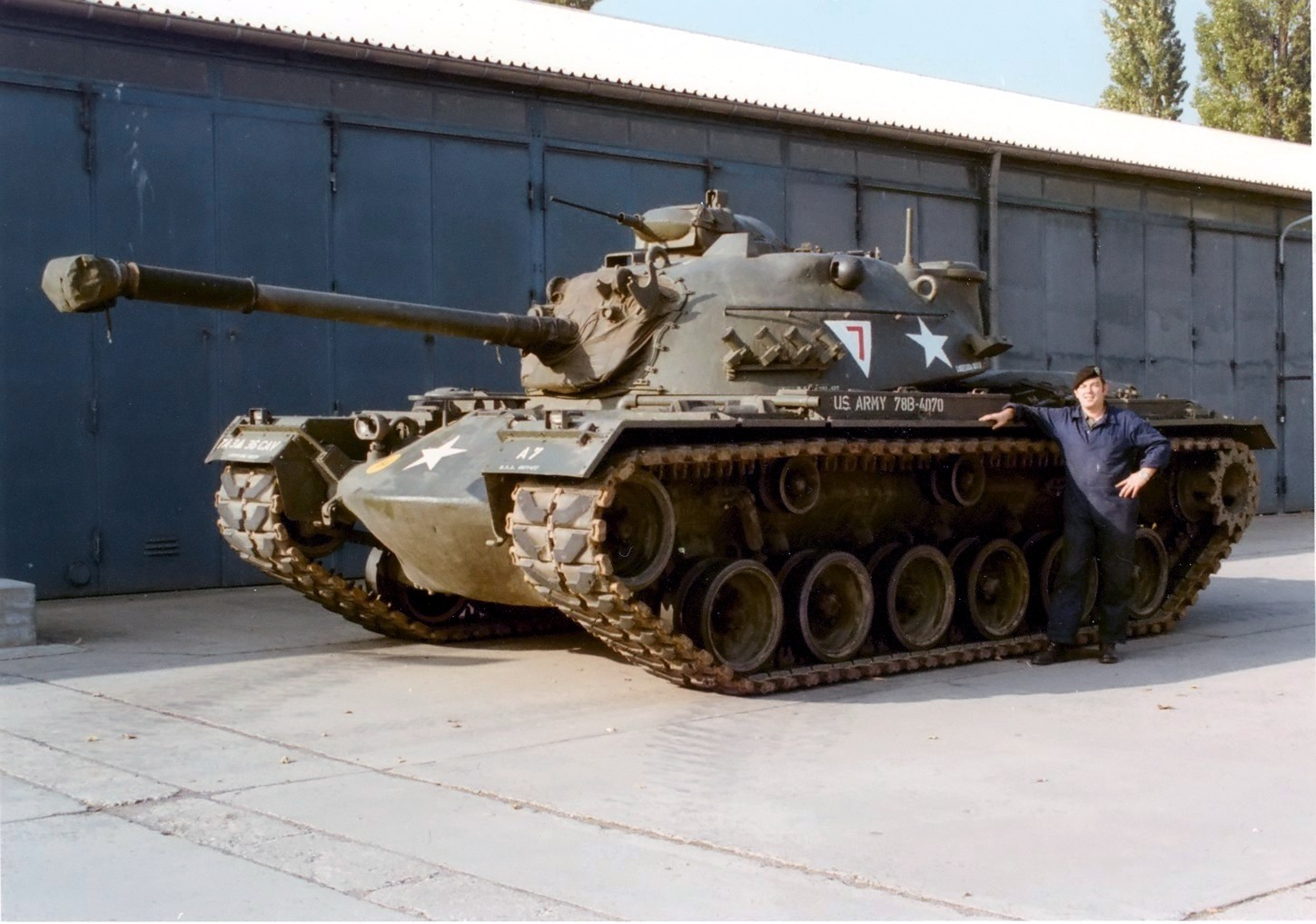
M48 A2C

The kingdom was replaced by a Republic in 1946. The Royal Army changed its name to Italian Army (Esercito Italiano), using tanks from the countries of the Allies from World War II. Following the creation of NATO, the Italian Army was integrated into NATO's Allied Forces Southern Europe and prepared for a feared invasion from the east, possibly via Yugoslavia.

Allied Land Forces Southern Europe (LANDSOUTH), was activated on 10 July 1951 to defend northeastern Italy. Some three infantry divisions, the Mantova Infantry Division in Udine, the Folgore Motorized Infantry Division in Treviso, the Trieste Motorized Infantry Division in Bologna, as well as three brigades, were the only forces initially available to this command to defend northeastern Italy.

Two of the three brigades were Alpini mountain infantry brigades - the Julia Alpine Brigade in Cividale del Friuli and Tridentina Alpine Brigade in Brixen; the third was the Ariete Armoured Brigade in Pordenone. Exercise "Italic Weld", a combined air-naval-ground exercise in northern Italy involving the United States, Italy, Turkey, and Greece, appears to have been one of the first exercises in which the new Italian Army orientation was tested.

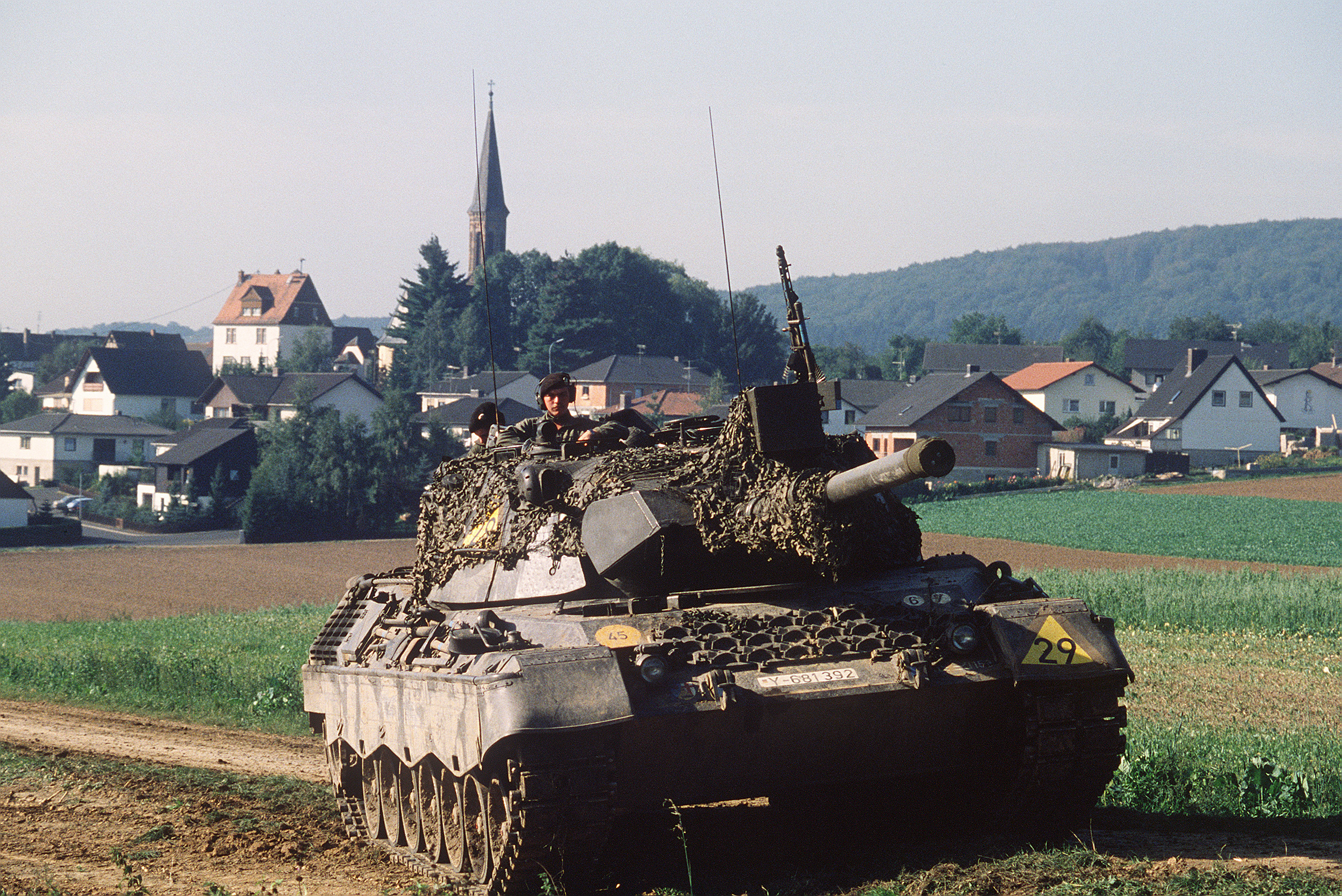
The main battle tank Leopard 1A1

In June 1957, West Germany and France signed an agreement to develop a common tank, designated in German Europa-Panzer. Three German (Arbeitsgruppe A, B and C) and one French design team would be included in a competition, with each team producing two prototypes each. In September, 1958 Italy joined the development program. In 1963 France and Germany had decided to each build their own tank; Germany continued with the Leopard, while France built the similar AMX-30.

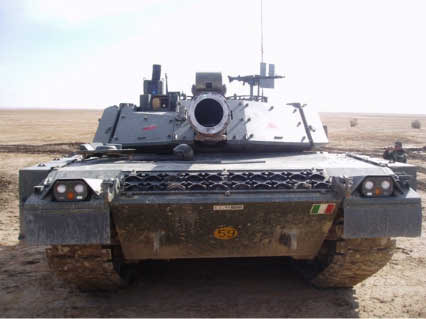
C1 Ariete front view

The Leopard 1 main battle tank was produced in West Germany and came out in 1965 and quickly became a standard of European forces, entering service with the Italian Army in 1971. Since 1990, the Leopard 1 were gradually relegated to secondary roles: Italy had 720 Leopard 1 (600 A2s, 120 A5s) that were retired by the end of 2008 (replaced by Ariete main battle tank); the AEVs, ARVs and ABLVs remain in service and 120 Leopard were kept in reserve.

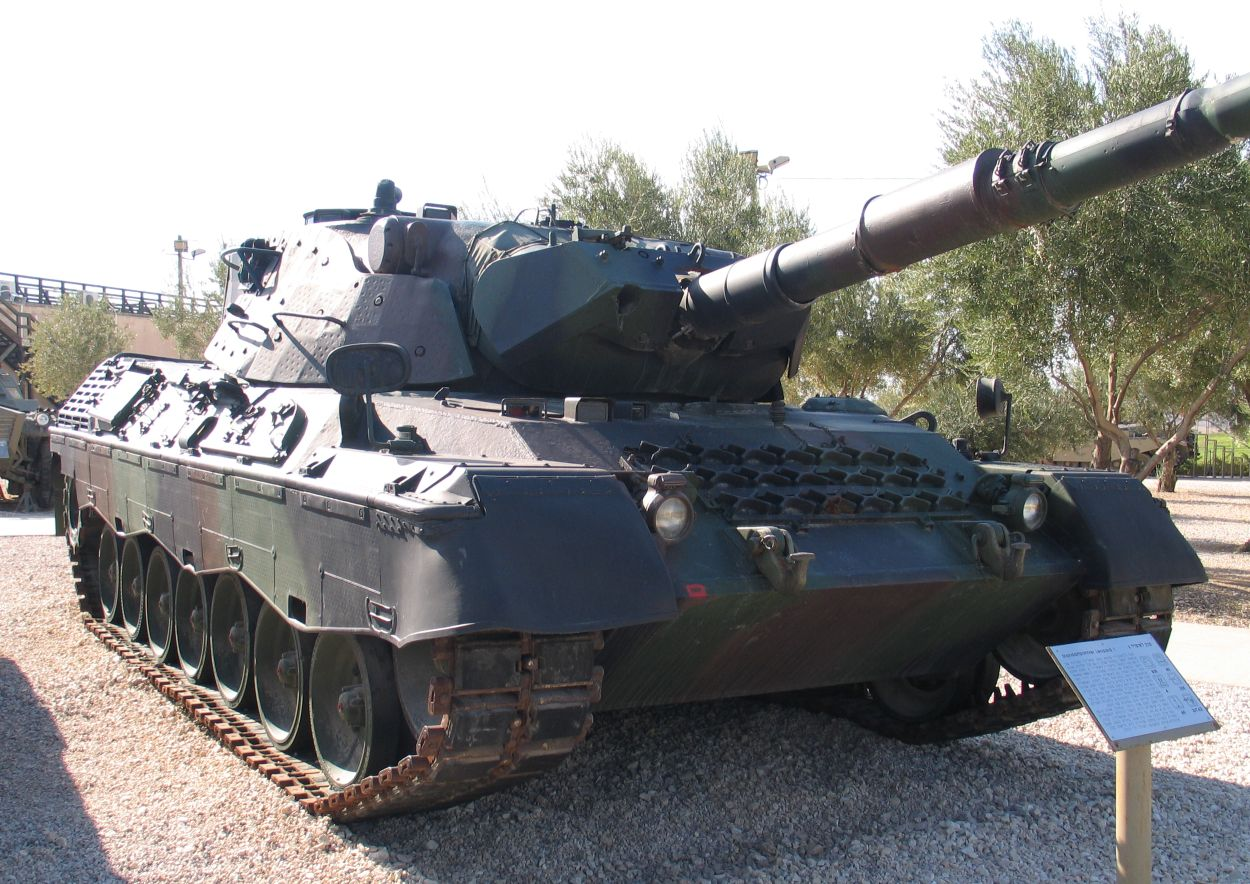
Leopard 1

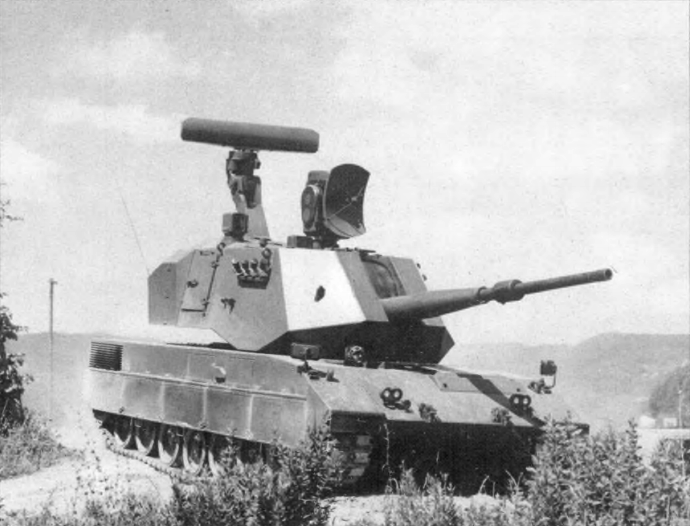
76-mm Super Rapid Gun System on OF-40 tank chassis

In 1977, design work was started by OTO Melara on the OF-40 main battle tank, developed as a joint venture between OTO Melara and FIAT and intended primarily for export sales. OTO Melara would develop and produce the hulls, and automotive components would be provided by FIAT. The OF-40 was very similar to versions of the German Leopard 1 with welded turrets (Leopard 1A3 & 1A4), which had also been produced under license by OTO Melara since 1974. The only orders for the vehicles ultimately came from the United Arab Emirates.

== Current ==
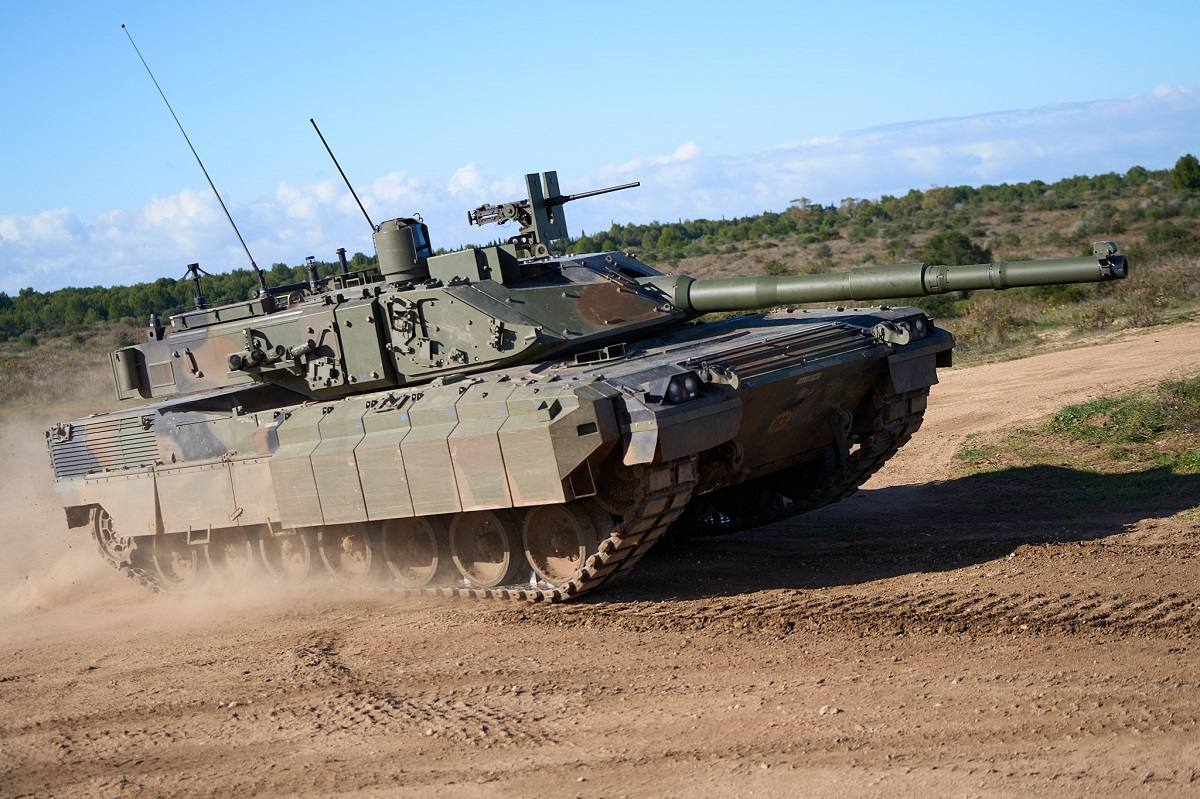
Italian Army Cavalry School Ariete C2 main battle tank during an exercise

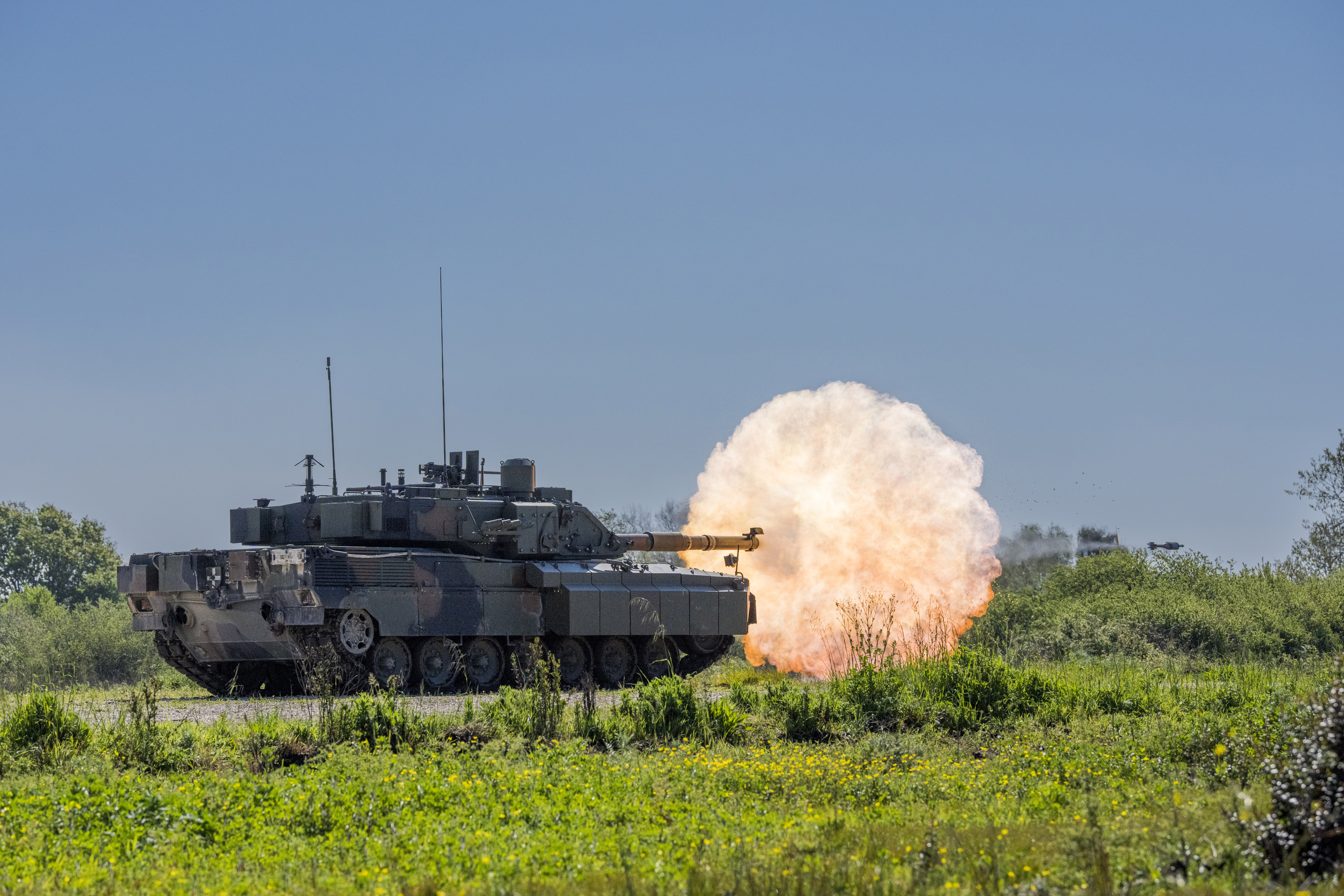
Italian Army - Ariete C2 main battle tank during acceptance trials

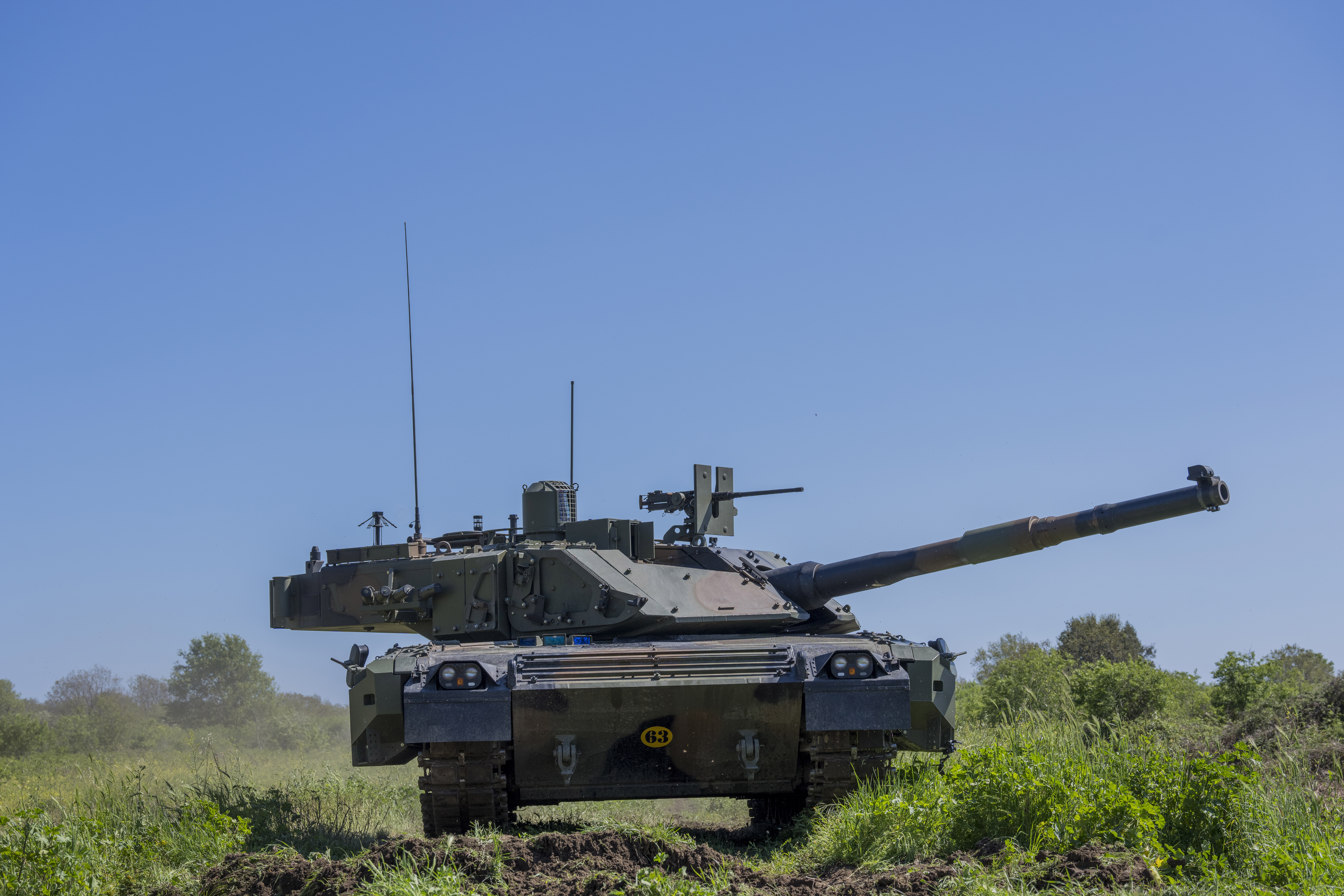
Italian Army - Ariete C2 main battle tank

The Ariete is the current main battle tank of the Italian Army, developed by a consortium formed by Iveco-Fiat and OTO Melara (also known as CIO, Consorzio Iveco OTO Melara). The chassis and engine were produced by Iveco, while the turret and fire-control system were produced by Oto Melara. The vehicle carries the latest optical and digital-imaging and fire-control systems, enabling it to fight day and night and to fire on the move. The first deliveries were in 1995, and the last occurred 8 years later in August 2002.

In 2013 the Army began a major reform. The three corps level commands COMFOD 1, COMFOD 2 and COMALP were disbanded and the Mantova Division Command moved from Vittorio Veneto to Florence, where it was renamed as Friuli Division Command, taking the name and traditions of the "Friuli" Air Assault Brigade. Together with the other two division commands Acqui and Tridentina it took command of the operational brigades of the Italian Army. At the same time two brigades - Cavalry Brigade "Pozzuolo del Friuli" and Mechanized Brigade "Granatieri di Sardegna" were disbanded, leaving the Army with nine operational combat brigades. The Pozzuolo del Friuli name and traditions will given to the "Friuli" Air Assault Brigade in January 2014.

Also in 2013 the Artillery Command and Engineer Command merged to create the Operational Support Command, while the Logistic Projection Command was disbanded and its units transferred to the brigades. As part of the reform the Army created the new Army Special Forces Command (COMFOSE) in Pisa, which took command of all Special Operations Forces of the Army.

Furthermore, the Operational Terrestrial Forces Command (COMFOTER) in Verona will disband by 2015 and the three divisions come under the newly raised Army Operational Center (Centro Operativo dell’Esercito or COE) in Rome.

At the end of the reform the armor in the Army will consist be in the following:

- 2x heavy brigades (Ariete, Garibaldi) armed with Centauro tank destroyers, Ariete tanks, Dardo infantry fighting vehicles and PzH2000 self propelled artillery;
- 2x medium brigades (Aosta, Pinerolo) armed with Centauros, Freccia infantry fighting vehicles;
- 4x light brigades (Folgore, Julia, Taurinense, Sassari) armed with Centauros, Puma armoured personnel carriers and FH70 towed artillery;

Name	Origin	Type	Number	Photo	Notes
Italian armoured vehicles
Ariete	Italy	Main battle tank	200		160 in service, 40 in reserve/schools
Centauro	Italy	Tank destroyer	400		300 in service (to be reduced to 136), 100 in reserve.
Centauro 2	Italy	Tank destroyer	150		In production
Dardo	Italy	Infantry fighting vehicle	200		
Freccia	Italy	Infantry fighting vehicle	250		+ other 381 exemplars to be financed
M113/M113A1/M106	United States	Armoured personnel carrier	3,000+		Few in service as TOW or mortar carrier; 1,300 as VCC-1/VCC-2, 700 in service, being phased out; 30+ Arisgator variants, Amphibious assault vehicles
Bandvagn 206S	Sweden	Armoured personnel carrier	189		
Puma 6x6	Italy	Armoured personnel carrier	250		
Puma 4x4	Italy	Armoured reconnaissance vehicle	310		
VAB NBC	France	Armoured reconnaissance-patrol vehicle	15		

== Overview per tank ==
(Only tanks and tankettes that were built in significant numbers are listed.)

The Italian designation system for tanks consisted of a letter (L, M or P; designating light, medium and heavy tanks respectively) followed by two numbers: one giving the approximate weight in tons, the other giving the year it was accepted for service. Thus "M11/39" means the 11 ton medium tank of 1939. The Italian definitions of light, medium and heavy tank differ from other nations at the time. For instance the Italian "medium" tanks are often described as "light" in other sources.

=== Tankettes ===
- L2/29 (imported Carden Loyd tankettes)
- L3/33
- L3/35
- L3/38 (L3/35 variant)

=== Light tanks ===
- L6/40
- L5/21
- L5/30 (L5/21 variant)

=== Medium tanks ===
- M11/39
- M13/40
- M14/41
- M15/42
- Fiat M16/43

=== Heavy tanks ===
- P40
- P43 tank

=== Main battle tanks ===
- C1 Ariete main battle tank
- OF-40 main battle tank

=== Self-propelled guns ===
- Semovente 47/32
- Semovente 75/18
- Semovente 75/34
- Semovente 75/46
- Semovente 90/53
- Semovente 105/25
- Semovente 149/40 (one prototype only)

== See also ==
- History of the tank
- List of interwar armoured fighting vehicles
- Tanks in World War II
- Tank classification
- List of military vehicles
