= L6/40 tank =

Carro Armato L6/40
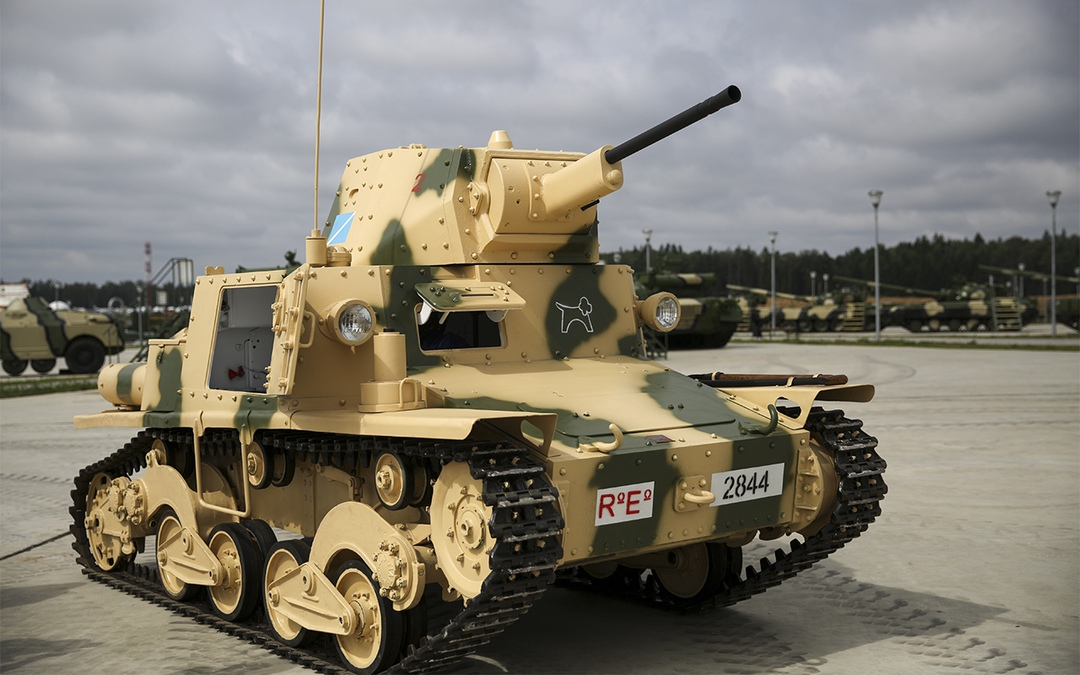
- Restored L6/40 of Kubinka Tank Museum
- Type: Light tank
- Place of origin: Italy

Service history
- In service: 1940–1944, postwar to the early 1950s
- Used by: Italy; Nazi Germany; Italian Social Republic; Independent State of Croatia
- Wars: World War II

Production history
- Designer: Ansaldo
- Designed: 1939
- Manufacturer: Fiat
- Produced: 1939–1944?
- No. built: 419 (402 before the armistice and 17 afterwards)
- Variants: Command tank, flame tank, ammunition carrier, Semovente 47/32

Specifications
- Mass: 6.8 tonnes (7.5 short tons; 6.7 long tons)
- Length: 3.78 m (12 ft 5 in)
- Width: 1.92 m (6 ft 4 in)
- Height: 2.03 m (6 ft 8 in)
- Crew: Two (commander/gunner and driver)
- Armour: 6–40 mm (0.24–1.57 in)
- Main armament: 20 mm Breda 35 with 296 rounds
- Secondary armament: 8 mm Breda 38 machine gun with 1,560 rounds
- Engine: SPA 180 4,053 cc four-cylinder 70 hp (52 kW)
- Suspension: Bogie
- Operational range: 200 km (120 mi)
- Maximum speed: 42 km/h (26 mph) road

The L6/40 was a light tank used by the Italian army from 1940 through World War II. It was designed by Ansaldo as an export product, and was adopted by the Italian Army when officials learned of the design and expressed interest. It was the main tank employed by the Italian forces fighting on the Eastern Front alongside the L6/40-based Semovente 47/32 self-propelled gun. L6/40s were also used in the North African campaign.

The official Italian designation was Carro Armato ("armored vehicle", i.e. "tank") L6/40. This designation means: "L" for Leggero ("light"), followed by the weight in tons (6) and the year of adoption (1940).

== Design and development ==
The L6/40 was a conventional light tank design of riveted construction. A one-man turret in the centre mounted a single Breda Modello 35 20 mm main gun and a Breda 38 8 mm coaxial machine gun. The driver sat in the front right of the hull. The riveted armour was six to 40 mm in thickness, which was roughly equivalent to existing Allied light tanks.

Compared to early 1930s Italian attempts at light tanks, the Carro D'Assalto 1936 and Carro Cannone Modello 1936 which were derived from the L3/33 tankettes, the L6/40 was a completely new design, the L6 went through a number of prototypes during the late 1930s. The first version had only twin 8 mm machine guns. Ultimately, the production configuration, named Carro Armato L6/40, was put into production in 1939, with 419 finally produced.

=== Variants ===
The L6 Lf (Lancia fiamme) flame tank variant was developed in which the main gun was replaced by a flamethrower with 200 litres of fuel. A command-tank variant carried extra radio gear and had an open-topped turret.

The most successful of the L6 variants was the Semovente 47/32, which eliminated the turret and substituted a 47 mm antitank gun in the open-topped hull.

A final version late in the war was an ammunition carrier armed only with a single 8 mm Breda machine gun. It was used alongside the Semovente 90/53, carrying 26 extra 90 mm rounds, as the Semovente 90/53 itself could only carry eight rounds.

== Combat use ==
L6/40 light tanks were used by the Italians in the Balkans Campaign, in the war against the Soviet Union, in the latter stages of the North African campaign, and in the defence of Sicily and Italy.

The L6/40 was the main tank employed by the Italian forces fighting on the Eastern Front. The L6 fought alongside the L6/40-based Semovente 47/32 self-propelled gun.

Although a good light tank for its size and an improvement over the tankettes that were common within the Italian army, it was already obsolete by the time of its introduction. The low silhouette of the vehicle (somewhat taller than the average man) made it useful for reconnaissance, and its armament was effective against any light vehicles it might encounter. However, due to a lack of a suitable medium tank, it was often employed in a combat role for which it was unsuited.

The L6 was also used by the German Army. In 1943, 26 Italian L6s were captured and used by the Hrvatsko domobranstvo of the Independent State of Croatia. The L6/40 was used postwar by the Polizia di Stato until it was phased out during the early 1950s.

== Surviving examples ==
Three L6/40s survive: one is kept in Legnano near the "Cadorna" barracks, one is in the inventory of the Kubinka Tank Museum, and another is preserved in the Arms Museum in the castle of Gjirokastër in Albania.

The hull of an L/40 used in Operation Rösselsprung, is displayed as a war memorial in Drvar Bosnia Herzegovina.

== Extended specification ==
- Water fording: 0.8 m (2 ft 8 in)
- Gradient: 60%
- Vertical obstacle: 0.7 m (2 ft 4 in)
- Trench: 1.7 m (5 ft 7 in)
- Elevation and Traverse: -12° to +20° through 360° of rotation

== Photo Gallery ==
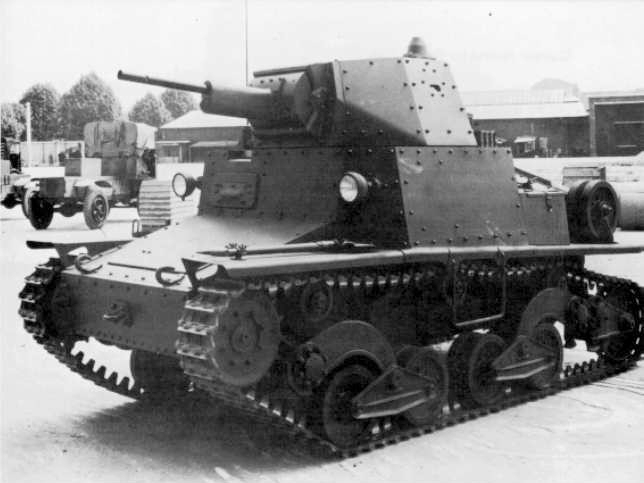
Fiat-Ansaldo L6/40 in 1940

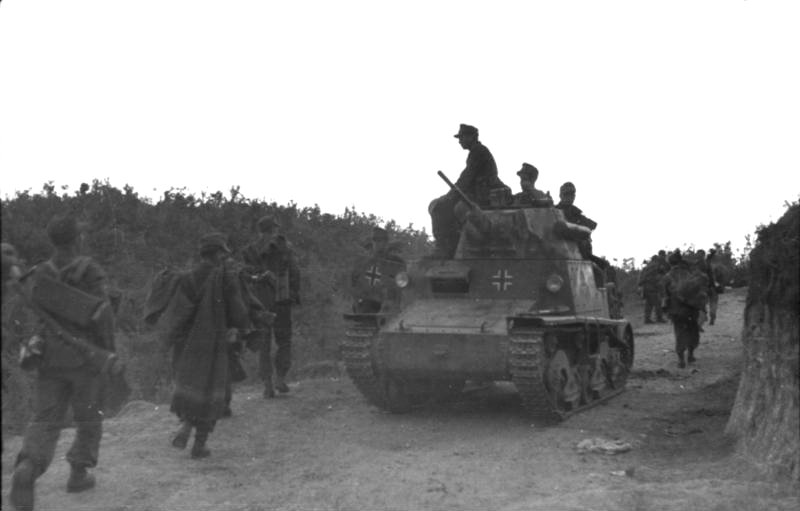
An L6/40 with German markings passes German infantrymen in occupied Albania, September 1943.

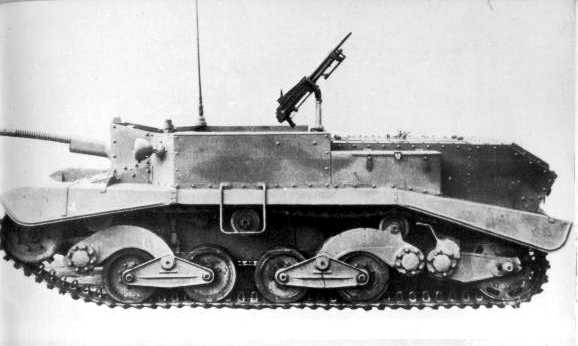
L6/40 ammunition carrier.

== See also ==
- List of armoured fighting vehicles of World War II
- Type 95 Ha-Go
- 7TP
- Stridsvagn L-60
