= Fiat 2000 =

Italian World War I heavy tank

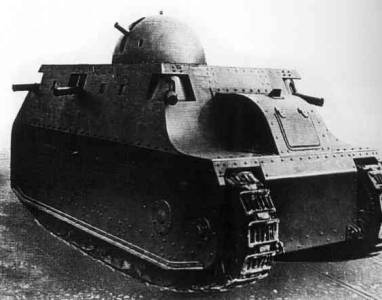
- Type: Heavy tank
- Place of origin: Kingdom of Italy

Service history
- In service: 1918−1934
- Used by: Kingdom of Italy

Production history
- Manufacturer: Fiat
- Produced: 1918
- No. built: 2 prototypes (Note: According to Foss, six were built in total: two prototypes and four pre-production models.)

Specifications
- Mass: 40,000 kg (88,000 lb)
- Length: 7.4 m (24 ft)
- Width: 3.1 m (10 ft)
- Height: 3.81 m (12.5 ft)
- Crew: 10
- Armor: 15–20 mm (0.59–0.79 in)
- Main armament: 1 × Cannone da 65/17 modello 13 65 mm gun
- Secondary armament: 7 × FIAT-Revelli mod. 1914 6.5 mm MG (original configuration); 2 x Vickers-Terni canone da 37/40 37mm gun, 5 x FIAT-Revelli mod. 1914 6.5mm MG (1934 configuration)
- Engine: Fiat A12 Aero, 6 cylinder, gasoline 179 kW (240 hp)
- Suspension: Bogie
- Operational range: 75 km (47 mi)
- Maximum speed: 6 km/h (3.7 mph)

The Fiat 2000 was an Italian heavy tank designed and produced by Fiat during World War I. Only two were built as it never entered serial production. It was heavily armed and armoured, but lacked mobility and after seeing limited service in Libya in 1919, it was largely replaced by french built Renault FT and later on, Fiat 3000 light tank, based on the FT.

== History ==
Italy was a latecomer in the development of tanks due the mountainous terrain in the border with Austria-Hungary and the lack of interest from the industry and the military. In 1916, the Italians ordered a French Schneider tank for evaluation, which was delivered in 1917. In the same year the Italians formed a "tank assault office" to study the Allied first tank forces. Spurred on by these developments, Italy's leading automotive company Fiat began working on a 40 tonne design armed with a 65 mm (2.6 in) main gun and seven machine guns. Only two prototypes were completed before the French Renault FT tank caught the attention of the Italian military.

== Description ==
Similar to in concept to the German A7V tank, the Fiat 2000 was a "mobile fortress" featuring heavy armour 20 mm (0.79 in) thick with the thinner sides having a thickness of 15 mm (0.59 in). The Fiat 2000 carried a 65 mm (2.6 in) gun as its main armament with a battery of seven 6.5 mm machine guns as secondary armament. The main gun was housed in a small spherical cupola on the roof of the tank. The interior was relatively spacious for tanks of the era and had a prominent cab for the driver. An airplane engine by Fiat provided power, while the hull concealed the suspension which had ten road wheels mounted in pairs on bogies. The vehicle was slow, but during tests, its ability to cross obstacles was deemed as adequate.

The sheer size of the vehicle, narrow tracks, excessive weight were criticized. The Italian Army concluded that the Fiat 2000 lacked the mobility necessary for operations in the north-eastern theater, and that the smaller and lighter Renault FT tank was better suited for the task, but by the time Italy finally managed to obtain a licence to build the French tank locally, the war already ended. (Note: The Italian General Staff requests for French-supplied FT tanks and British armored support were rejected, and as result, no tanks were employed at all in the Italian front.)

== Service ==
A single Fiat 2000 and three Renault FTs were sent to Libya in 1919 to fight local tribes, but the slow speed of the heavy tank made it unsuitable against the guerilla tactics used by the enemy. Only two prototypes were completed, while the Renault FT was locally built in Italy until the introduction of the Fiat 3000 in 1921.

According to Foss, the Fiat 2000 remained in service until 1934.

== Replica ==
A project aimed at building a full-sized working replica of the Fiat 2000 has been created as of March 2017. The project was started by volunteers, aiming to raise the necessary funds with crowdfunding. From June 2017 to October 2018 the committee worked on remaking a complete set of blueprints, after which the construction of the replica started on 15 November 2018. The project was declared complete and was painted and running on its own power as of April 2020

== See also ==
- Fiat 3000
