= Fiat 3000 =

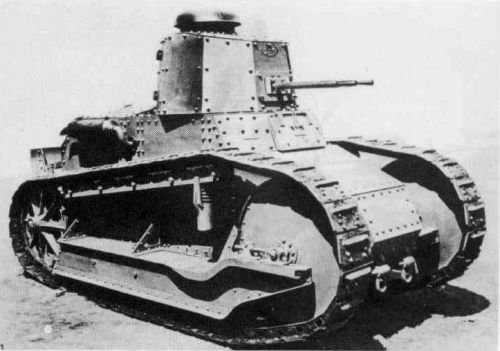
- Fiat 3000 mod.21
- Type: Light tank
- Place of origin: Italy

Service history
- In service: 1921–1945
- Used by: See § Operators
- Wars: Pacification of Libya; Ethiopian coup d'état of 1928; Second Italo–Abyssinian War; Japanese invasion of Manchuria; Second Sino–Japanese War; Slovak-Hungarian War; World War II

Production history
- No. built: 152 (100 mod 21, 52 mod 30)

Specifications
- Mass: 6 tonnes
- Length: 4.29 m (168.9 in)
- Width: 1.65 m (65.0 in)
- Height: 2.20 m (86.6 in)
- Crew: 2
- Armor: 6 mm-16 mm
- Main armament: 2 x FIAT-Revelli mod. 1914 6.5 mm machine guns 3000A; 1x Vickers-Terni canone da 37/40 37 mm cannon 3000B
- Secondary armament: 1 x FIAT-Revelli mod. 1914 6.5 mm machine gun
- Engine: 6.3 litre Fiat straight 4-cylinder 50 hp (37 kW)
- Suspension: vertical springs
- Operational range: 100 km (62 mi)
- Maximum speed: 21 km/h (13 mph)

The Fiat 3000 (also called F-3000) was the first tank to be produced in series in Italy. It became the standard tank of the emerging Italian armored units after World War I. The 3000 was based on the French Renault FT.

== History ==
Although 1,400 units were ordered, with deliveries to begin in May 1919, the end of the war caused the original order to be canceled and only 100 were delivered. The first Fiat 3000s entered service in 1921 and were officially designated as the carro d'assalto Fiat 3000, Mod. 21 (Italian for "Fiat 3000 assault tank, Model 21"). Tests of the Model 21 revealed that the armament, consisting of two 6.5 mm machine guns, was inadequate, and adoption of a 37 mm gun as main armament was urged.

The up-gunned version of the 3000, armed with a 37/40 gun, was tested in 1929 and was officially adopted in 1930 with the designation of carro d'assalto Fiat 3000, Mod. 30. The Model 30, in addition to its improved armament, also differed from the Model 21 in that it had a more powerful engine, improved suspension, different engine compartment silhouette, and the external stores were stowed differently. By turning the engine sideways for the first time (a principle still used on Russian tanks today) after slightly widening the hull, Italian engineers were able to make the fighting compartment much less cramped and the tank shorter and lighter at the same time. Some Model 30s were also produced with two 6.5 mm machine guns as main armament, as on the Model 21, in lieu of the 37 mm gun. A limited number of Model 21 vehicles were exported to Albania, Latvia (6 in 1926), Hungary, and Abyssinia (Ethiopia) prior to 1930.

The designations of these tanks were changed prior to the outbreak of World War II, in accordance with the identification system that was adopted throughout the war by the Italians. The Model 21 was redesignated L5/21, and the Model 30 was redesignated L5/30.

== Battle ==
The Fiat 3000 (Model 21) was first used in action in February 1926 in Libya, and subsequently also saw action against the Ethiopians in the Second Italo-Abyssinian War in 1935. It was not one of the tanks used by the Italians in Spain during the Spanish Civil War, however. With Italy's entry into World War II in June 1940, a limited number of Fiat 3000s still in service with the Italian Army were employed operationally on the Greek-Albanian front. They were also among the last Italian tanks to oppose the Allies, as in July 1943, when the Allies landed in Sicily, two Italian tank companies on the island were still equipped with the 3000. One company was dug in and their vehicles were used as fixed fortifications, while the other company was assigned to Gruppo Mobile H and fought in the defense of San Pietro airfield.

== Operators ==
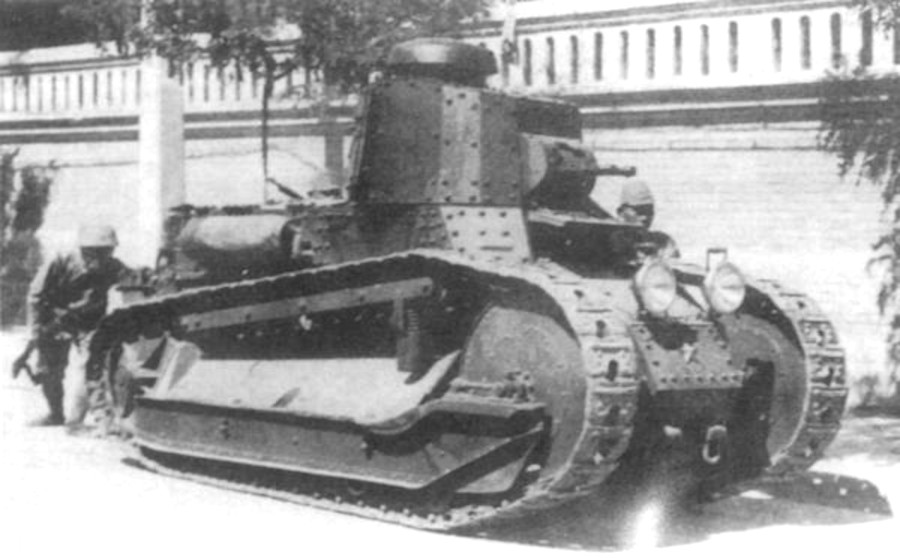
Fiat 3000 tank of the Imperial Japanese Army during the Mukden Incident, 1931

Kingdom of Italy

- Royal Italian Army

Argentina

- Argentine Army purchased one FIAT 3000 Modello 1921.

Kingdom of Albania

- Royal Albanian Army purchased two Fiat 3000 in the late 1920s.

Soviet Union

- Soviet Army purchased three FIAT 3000 in 1927. These arrived in Moscow in March 1928.

Kingdom of Denmark

- Royal Danish Army purchased one Fiat 3000 in June 1928 for evaluation purposes.

Ethiopian Empire

- Army of the Ethiopian Empire purchased one Fiat 3000 in 1925 and three more in 1930.

Latvia

- Latvian Land Forces purchased six Fiat 3000 in 1927. They equipped two platoons of the 1st Tank Company, located in Riga.

Kingdom of Spain

- Spanish Army purchased a single example for testing in October 1924. After the unsuccessful trials and its rejection as the next Spanish light tank, the tank was left at the Escuela Central de Tiro in Carabanchel, Madrid.

Kingdom of Hungary

- Royal Hungarian Army purchased five Fiat 3000 in the 1930s.

Empire of Japan

- Imperial Japanese Army purchased one Fiat 3000 for testing. This tank participated in the Second Sino-Japanese War.

== See also ==
- Fiat 2000
- Pacification of Libya
- Ethiopian coup d'état of 1928
