= Puma (Italian armoured fighting vehicle) =

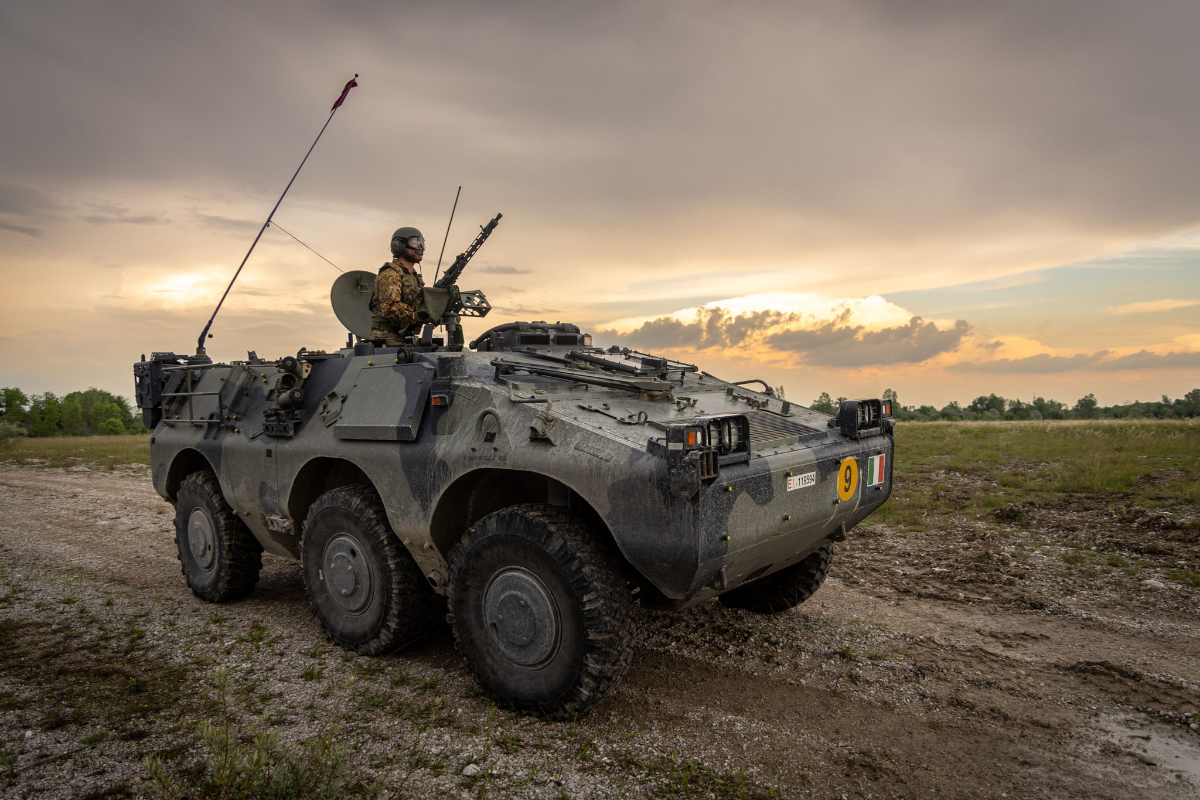
- Puma 6×6 with a MG 42/59 machine gun mount
- Type: Armoured personnel carrier / scout car
- Place of origin: Italy

Service history
- In service: 2001–present
- Used by: Operators

Production history
- Designed: 1988
- Manufacturer: Iveco-Oto Melara
- Produced: 2001–2004
- No. built: 250 6×6 and 330 4×4

Specifications
- Mass: 8.2/7 t
- Length: 5.07/4.76 m
- Width: 2.09 m
- Height: 1.67 m
- Crew: 2+4/2+2 passengers
- Main armament: 7.62mm, 12.7mm MG or Remote Weapon System
- Secondary armament: Smoke-grenade launchers
- Engine: IVECO 4-cylinder turbo-charged diesel 160 hp (118 kW)
- Power/weight: 22.8 (4×4) hp/tonne
- Transmission: 5-speed automatic 6×6/4×4
- Operational range: 700 km (435 mi)
- Maximum speed: 110 km/h

The Puma is an Italian light wheeled armoured fighting vehicle family, consisting of the Puma 6×6 and the Puma 4×4. The vehicles were developed and are produced by the Consorzio Iveco Fiat – Oto Melara for the Italian Army. First prototypes completed in 1988, with a total of five testbed vehicles being completed by 1990.

The 4x4 variant carries 3 troop members plus the driver, the 6×6 variant carries 6 troops plus driver.

== History ==
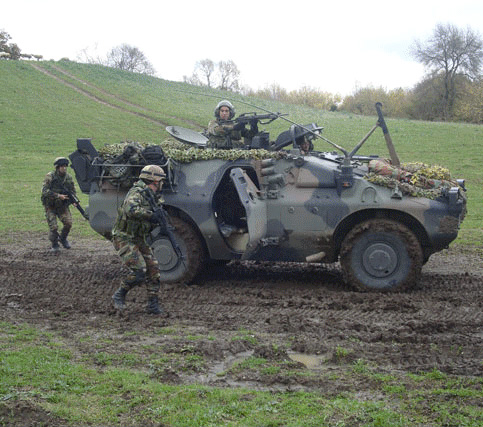
Italian Army Puma 4×4

At first the Puma was intended to complement the B1 Centauro wheeled tank destroyer in service with the Italian Army's Cavalry Regiments, but ultimately most light infantry regiments of the Italian Army also received Pumas. At the end of 1999, the Italian Army ordered 610 Puma vehicles, 360 of the 6×6 configuration, and 250 4×4 vehicles. First vehicles were completed in mid-2003.

The 4×4 variant carries two soldiers in addition to the driver and gunner, and is used in pairs for battlefield reconnaissance. The 6X6 version carries four soldiers plus driver and gunner, and together with another Puma 6×6 can carry an Italian infantry squad of eight men. In 2007 the Italian Army ordered 19 Hitrole 12.7mm machine gun remote controlled turrets from Oto Melara and is planning to add extra armor to the vehicle.

In March 2013, Italy donated 20 of its Puma 4×4 vehicles to the Libyan National Army to face terrorism threats and reaffirm friendly ties with the former colony.

In April 2024, a destroyed Puma was seen in drone footage near Bilohorivka, Luhansk Oblast, suggesting the vehicle was in service with the Armed Forces of Ukraine, although no record of their deliveries was made.

== Operators ==
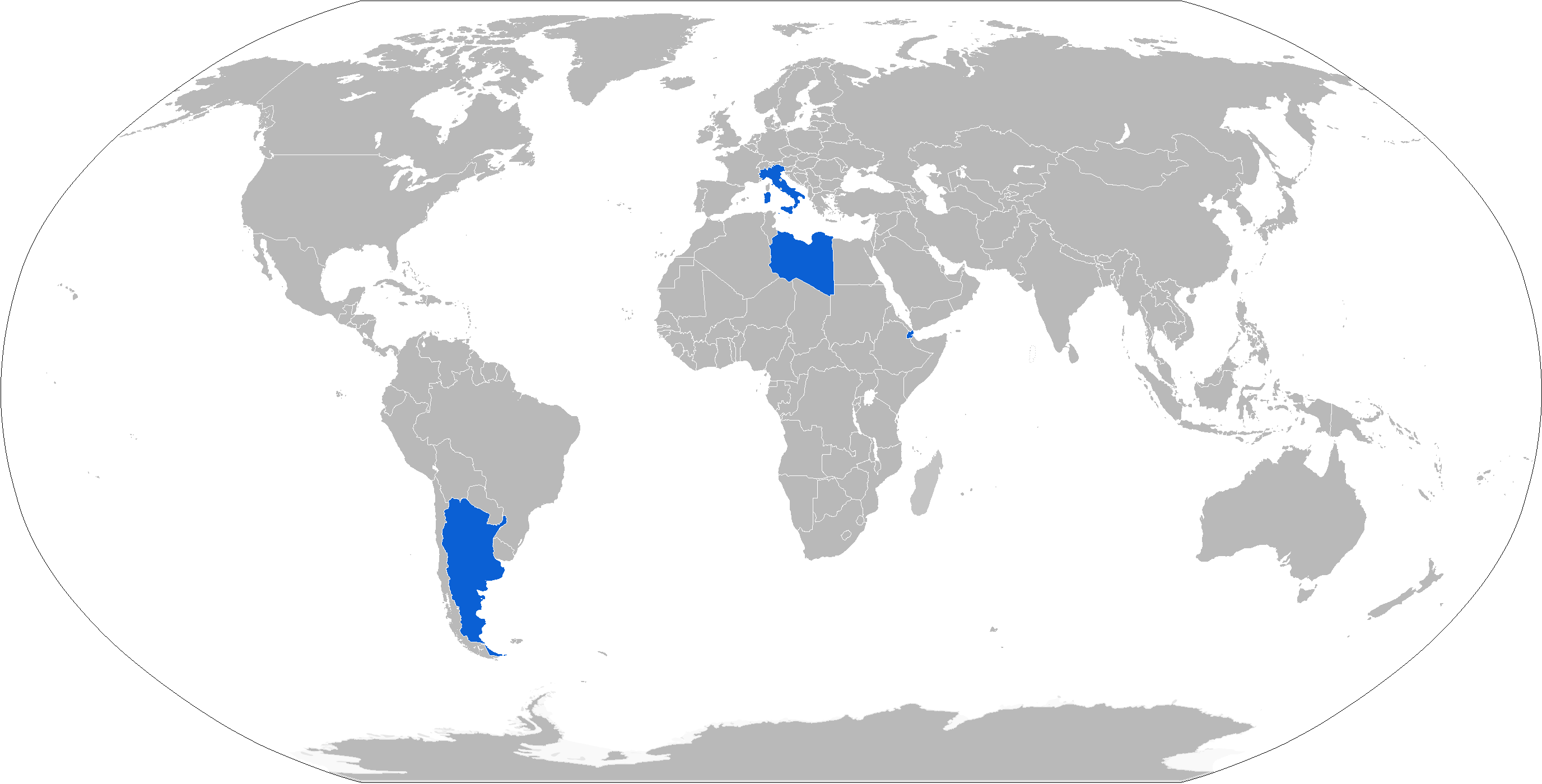
Map of Puma AFV operators in blue

- Argentina: Argentine Army – 2 units to train peacekeepers at Campo de Mayo
- Djibouti: 14 Puma 4x4 donated by Italy
- Libya: 20 Puma 4×4 vehicles donated from the Italian Army to Libyan National Army.
- Pakistan: Pakistani Army – 79 Puma 6x6 sold from Italian stocks
- Ukraine: Armed Forces of Ukraine – Unknown number in service, at least one destroyed

=== Former ===
- Italy: Italian Army: 610 ordered, 360 6x6 and 250 4x4, all decommissioned by 2025

== See also ==
- VBL of France
- Komatsu LAV of Japan
- Otokar Cobra of Turkey
