= Cannone da 65/17 modello 13 =

Italian mountain gun

65 mm mountain gun
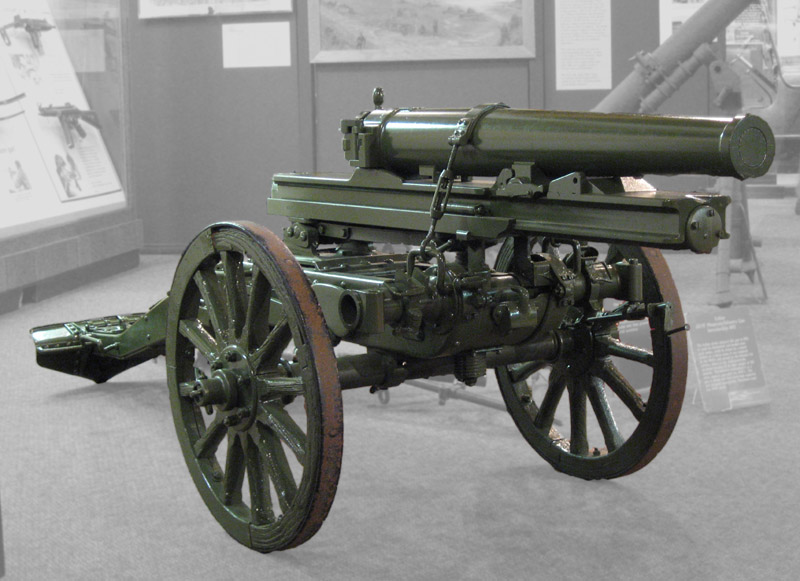
- Type: Mountain artillery
- Place of origin: Kingdom of Italy

Service history
- In service: 1913-1945
- Used by: Kingdom of Italy; Kingdom of Albania; Nazi Germany; Ecuador; Kingdom of Romania
- Wars: World War I Spanish Civil War; World War II; Ecuadorian–Peruvian War; Second Italo-Ethiopian War

Production history
- Produced: 1911–1940
- No. built: unknown, 719 units in service June 1940

Specifications
- Mass: 560 kg (1,225 lb) Combat
- Barrel length: 1.1 m (3 ft 7 in) L/17.7
- Shell: 65 x 172 mm R
- Shell weight: 4.3 kilograms (9.5 lb)
- Caliber: 65 mm (2.55 in)
- Carriage: Horse-drawn, two wheeled, box trail
- Elevation: -10° to +20°
- Traverse: 8°
- Muzzle velocity: 345 m/s (1,130 ft/s)
- Effective firing range: 6.8 km (4.2 mi)

The cannone da 65/17 modello 13 was an artillery piece developed by Italy for use with its mountain and infantry units. The designation means 65 mm calibre gun, barrel length 17 calibres, which entered service in 1913. The designation is often shortened to cannone da 65/17.

== Description ==
A lightweight design, the 65 mm gun was designed for use in difficult terrain and extreme weather conditions. The barrel had a 17 calibre length, and was designed for firing low-trajectory shots. The carriage was likewise simple in nature, consisting of a single trailing arm and solid-rim spoked wheels for horse draft. The weapon could be broken-down into five loads for transport. A simple folding gun shield was also provided in 1935.

== History ==
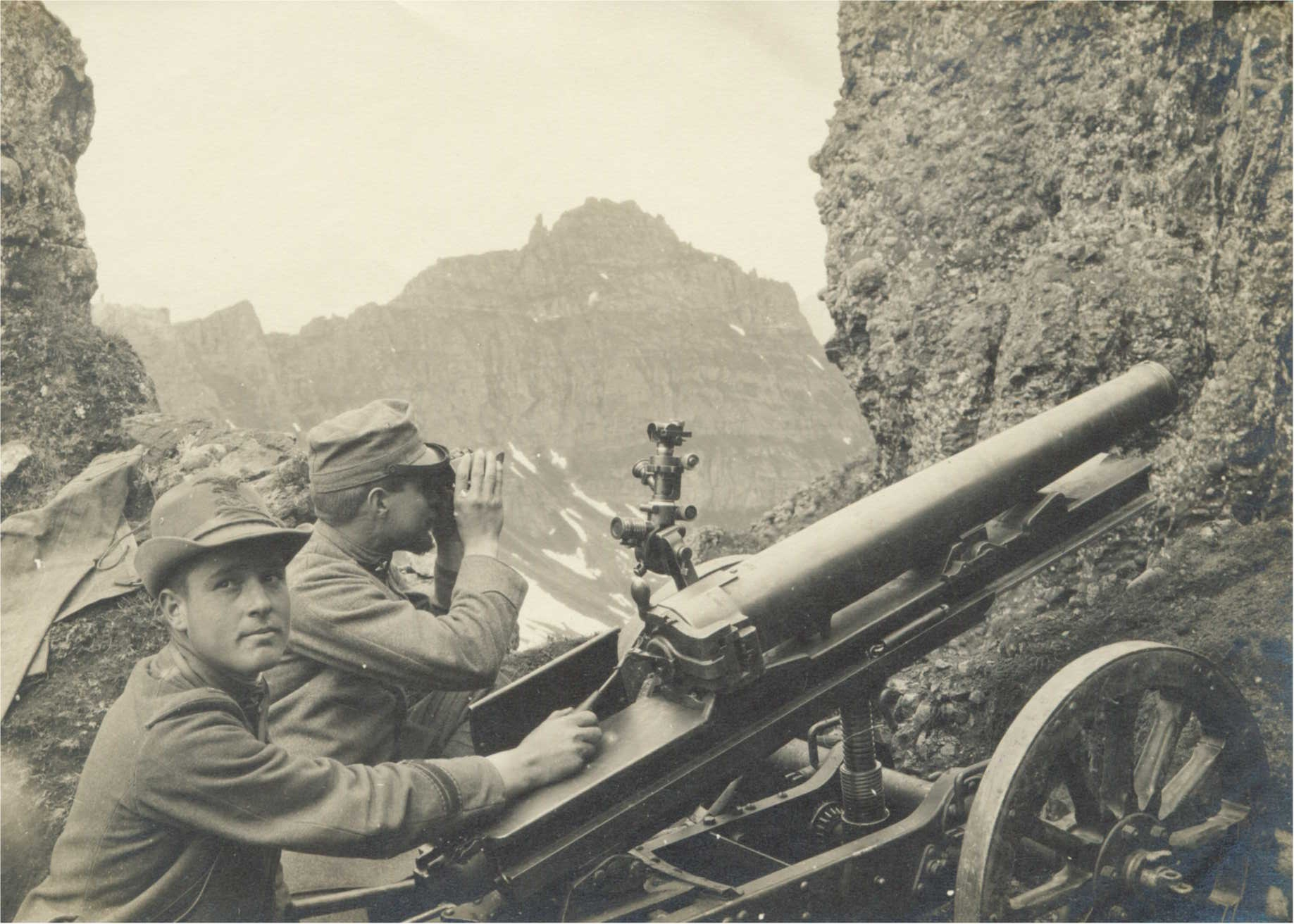
A Mountain artillery unit with a 65/17 modello 13 gun on Monte Padon firing at Austrian positions on the Sass di Mezdi

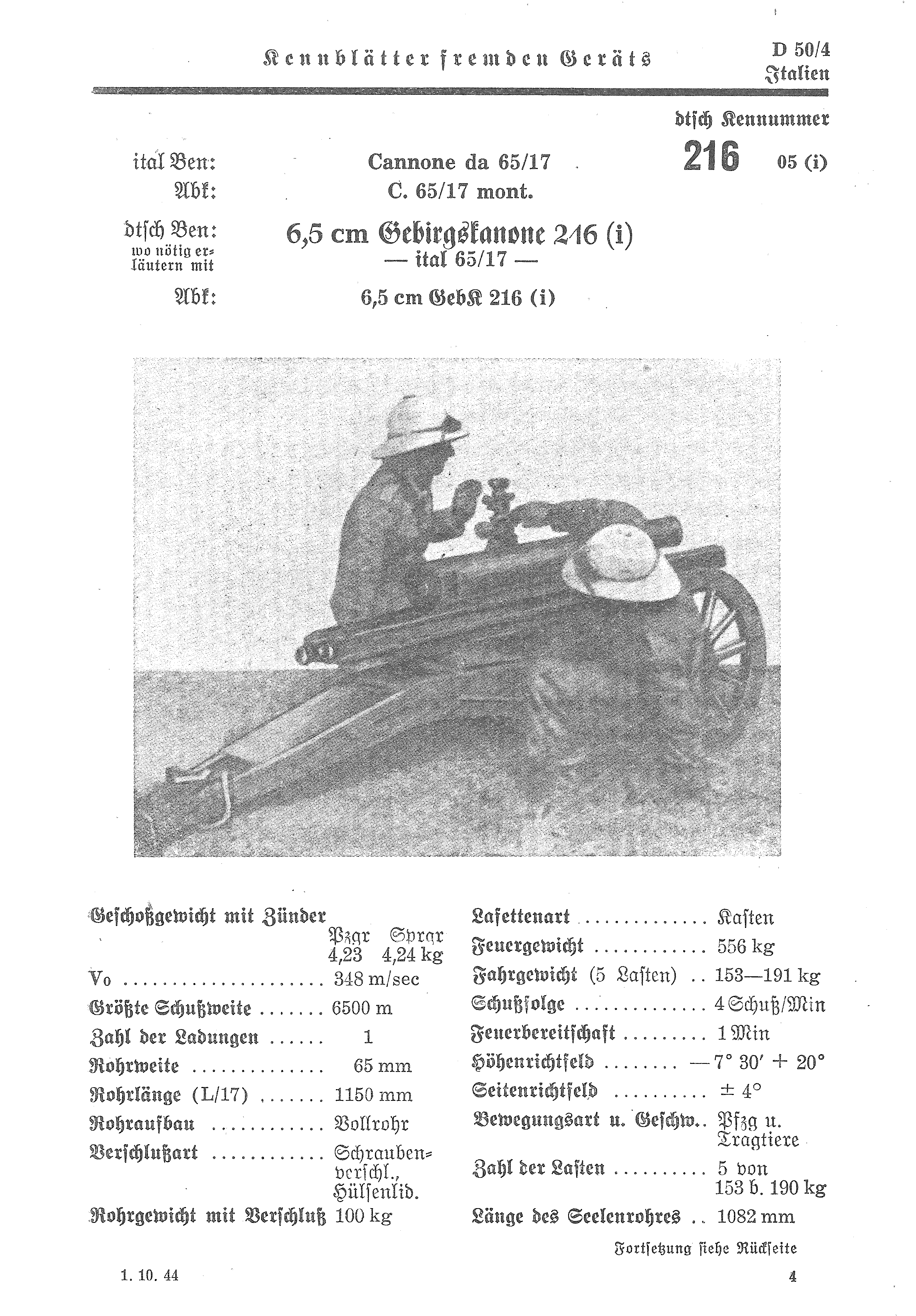
German Datasheet

The 65 mm gun was first accepted into service with Italian mountain troops in 1913, and it served with them throughout World War I. It was used in the Fiat 2000 heavy tank which saw action in Libya. Replacements arrived in the 1920s and the gun was transferred to the regular infantry. It was well liked by the infantry due to its minimal weight and high reliability in adverse conditions. Despite its light calibre, it served through World War II with Italian forces as a close support weapon. It was effective also mounted on truck, particularly on captured Morris CS8 in North Africa, as anti-tank artillery. Guns captured by the Germans after the Italian defeat were given the designation 6.5 cm GebK 246(i).

Some were fielded by the Ecuadorian Army during the Ecuadorian–Peruvian War.

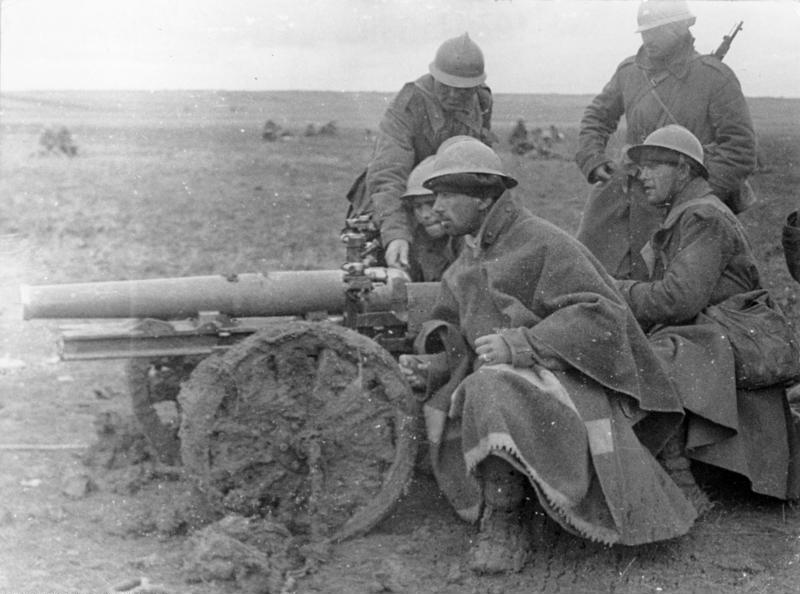
Nationalist forces at the Battle of Guadalajara

== See also ==
- List of mountain artillery
- Canon de 65 M(montagne) modele 1906, a French mountain artillery piece, also used by the Germans under the name "6.5 cm Gebirgskanone 221(f)"
- Fiat 2000

== Sources ==
- Hogg, Ian; 2000; Twentieth Century Artillery; Amber Books, Ltd.; ISBN 1-58663-299-X
