= 5th Tank Battalion "M.O. Chiamenti" =

Inactive Italian Army tank unit

- 5° Battaglione Carri "M.O. Chiamenti"
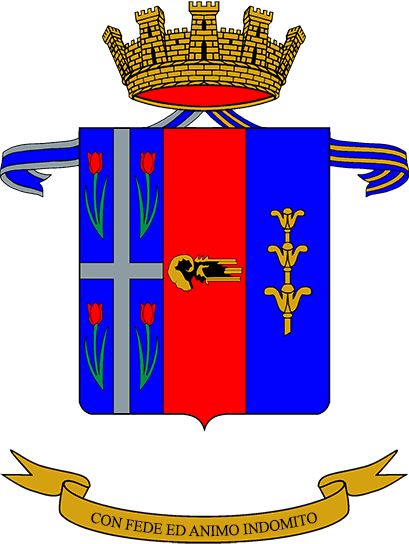
- Battalion coat of arms
- Active: 11 Nov. 1940 — 8 Feb. 1941; 1 July 1964 — 25 Aug. 1992
- Country: Italy
- Branch: Italian Army
- Part of: Armored Brigade "Ariete"
- Garrison/HQ: Tauriano
- Motto: "Con fede ed animo indomito"
- Anniversaries: 8 February 1941
- Decorations: 1x Silver Medal of Military Valor; 1x Silver Medal of Army Valor

Insignia
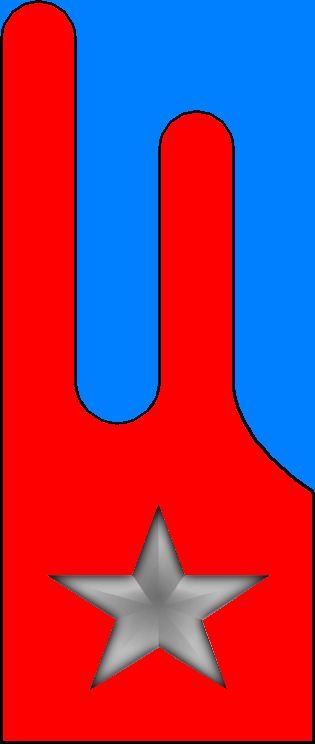
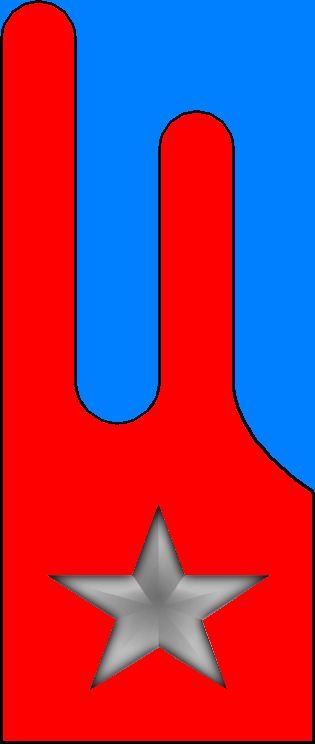
- Tank units gorget patches

The 5th Tank Battalion "M.O. Chiamenti" (Italian: 5° Battaglione Carri "M.O. Chiamenti") is an inactive tank battalion of the Italian Army, which was based in Tauriano in Friuli-Venezia Giulia and last operationally assigned to the 132nd Armored Brigade "Ariete". The unit's lineage traces back to the World War II V Tank Battalion M13/40, which was formed on 11 November 1940 by the depot of the 32nd Tank Infantry Regiment. In January 1941, the battalion arrived in Libya to shore up the crumbling Italian 10th Army, which was disintegrating quickly due to the British Operation Compass. On 10 January 1941, the battalion was assigned to the Special Armored Brigade and in the following 25 days the battalion fought British forces until the battalion was annihilated in the Battle of Beda Fomm. In 1964, the battalion was reformed and assigned to the 32nd Tank Regiment. In 1975, the battalion was renamed 5th Tank Battalion "M.O. Chiamenti" and assigned to the 32nd Armored Brigade "Mameli". In 1991, the battalion was transferred to the 132nd Armored Brigade "Ariete". On 25 August 1992, the battalion was disbanded and its personnel merged into the 3rd Tank Battalion "M.O. Galas", which the next day entered the reformed 32nd Tank Regiment.

Originally the unit, like all Italian tank units, was part of the army's infantry arm, but on 1 June 1999 the tankers specialty was transferred from the infantry arm to the cavalry arm. The battalion's anniversary falls on 8 February, the last day of the Battle of Beda Fomm, during which the remnants of the V Tank Battalion M13/40 continued to fight until the total annihilation of the battalion.

== History ==
=== World War II ===
On 11 November 1940, the depot of the 32nd Tank Infantry Regiment in Verona formed the V Tank Battalion M13/40, which was equipped with M13/40 tanks. On 9 December 1940, the British Western Desert Force commenced Operation Compass, which within weeks destroyed most of the Italian 10th Army in eastern Libya. On 13 December 1940, the V Tank Battalion M13/40 embarked in Naples and after arriving in Libya was assigned, on 10 January 1941, to the Special Armored Brigade. Five days later, on 15 January, the battalion arrived at the front. On 24 January, the Special Armored Brigade battled the British 7th Armoured Division in the Action at Mechili. During the fighting the Mechili the V Tank Battalion M13/40 lost eight M13/40 tanks and suffered nine men killed in action and twelve wounded in action. By nightfall the Special Armored Brigade began its retreat to Antelat with the V Tank Battalion M13/40 as rearguard. Over the next days the retreat continued westward with British tanks in close pursuit. On 6 February, the retreating Italian formations found their escape route blocked by the British Combeforce at Beda Fomm and in the ensuing Battle of Beda Fomm the last remnants of the Italian 10th Army, including the V Tank Battalion M13/40, were annihilated. On 8 February 1941, the V Tank Battalion M13/40 was declared lost due to wartime events.

For its conduct and sacrifice between 15 January and 8 February 1941 the V Tank Battalion M13/40 was awarded a Silver Medal of Military Valor.

=== Cold War ===
On 1 March 1964, the 32nd Tank Regiment was reformed in Cordenons and assigned to the II Armored Brigade "Ariete" of the Armored Division "Ariete". On 1 July 1964, the regiment reformed the III Tank Battalion in Cordenons and the V Tank Battalion in Tauriano and on 20 October of the same year the regiment received the XXIII Bersaglieri Battalion. On 1 October 1968, the brigade headquarters were disbanded and the same year the entire regiment moved to Tauriano.

During the 1975 army reform the army disbanded the regimental level and newly independent battalions were granted for the first time their own flags, respectively in the case of cavalry units, their own standard. On 30 September 1975, the 32nd Tank Regiment was disbanded and the next day the regiment's V Tank Battalion in Tauriano became an autonomous unit and was renamed 5th Tank Battalion "M.O. Chiamenti". As part of the reform tank and armored battalions were named for officers, soldiers and partisans of the tank speciality, who had served in World War II and been awarded Italy's highest military honor the Gold Medal of Military Valor. The 5th Tank Battalion was named for Marshal Carlo Chiamenti, who, while serving as platoon commander in the IV Tank Battalion M13/40, was killed in action on 15 April 1941 during the invasion of Yugoslavia.

On the same date, 1 October 1975, the 32nd Tank Regiment's III Tank Battalion became an autonomous unit and was renamed 3rd Tank Battalion "M.O. Galas", while the XXIII Bersaglieri Battalion became an autonomous unit and was renamed 23rd Bersaglieri Battalion "Castel di Borgo". The three battalions were assigned to the 32nd Armored Brigade "Mameli", which was formed on the same day by reorganizing the command of the 32nd Tank Regiment. Each of the two tank battalions consisted of a command, a command and services company, and three tank companies with M60A1 Patton main battle tanks. Each of the two battalions fielded 434 men (32 officers, 82 non-commissioned officers, and 320 soldiers). On 12 November 1976, the President of the Italian Republic Giovanni Leone assigned with decree 846 the flag and traditions of the 32nd Tank Regiment to the 3rd Tank Battalion "M.O. Galas" and granted the 5th Tank Battalion "M.O. Chiamenti" a new flag. Upon receiving is flag, the 5th Tank Battalion "M.O. Chiamenti" also received the Silver Medal of Military Valor, which had been awarded to the battalion for its conduct and sacrifice during the Western Desert campaign. The medal was then affixed to the battalion's flag and added to the battalion's coat of arms.

For its conduct and work after the 1976 Friuli earthquake the 5th Tank Battalion "M.O. Chiamenti" was awarded a Silver Medal of Army Valor, which was affixed to the battalion's flag and added to the battalion's coat of arms.

=== Recent times ===
After the end of the Cold War Italian Army began to draw down its forces and, on 1 April 1991, the 32nd Armored Brigade "Mameli" was disbanded, while the 3rd Tank Battalion "M.O. Galas", 5th Tank Battalion "M.O. Chiamenti", and 23rd Bersaglieri Battalion "Castel di Borgo" were transferred to the 132nd Armored Brigade "Ariete". On 25 August 1992, the 5th Tank Battalion "M.O. Chiamenti" was disbanded, while the 3rd Tank Battalion "M.O. Galas" lost its autonomy. The next day, on 26 August 1992, the personnel of the disbanded 5th Tank Battalion "M.O. Chiamenti" was merged into the 3rd Tank Battalion "M.O. Galas", which, on the same date, entered the reformed 32nd Tank Regiment. On 24 November 1992, the flag of the 5th Tank Battalion "M.O. Chiamenti" was transferred to the Shrine of the Flags in the Vittoriano in Rome for safekeeping.

== See also ==
- 132nd Armored Brigade "Ariete"
