= 32nd Tank Regiment (Italy) =

Active Italian Army tank unit

- 32° Reggimento Carri
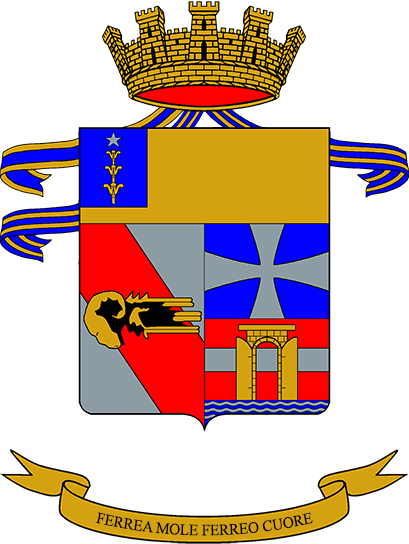
- Regimental coat of arms
- Active: 15 Sept. 1936 — 8 Jan. 1942; 20 Sept. 1942 — 31 Aug. 1944; 1 March 1964 — today
- Country: Italy
- Branch: Italian Army
- Part of: 132nd Armored Brigade "Ariete"
- Garrison/HQ: Tauriano
- Motto: "Ferrea mole ferreo cuore"
- Anniversaries: 8 February 1941
- Decorations: 1x Gold Medal of Military Valor; 1x Silver Medal of Army Valor; 1x Bronze Medal of Army Valor; 1x Italian Red Cross Bronze Medal of Merit

Insignia
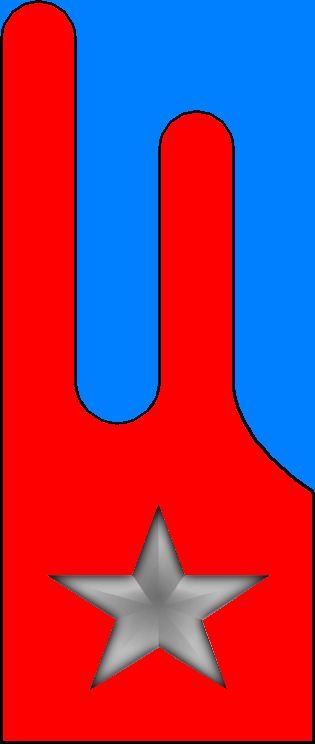
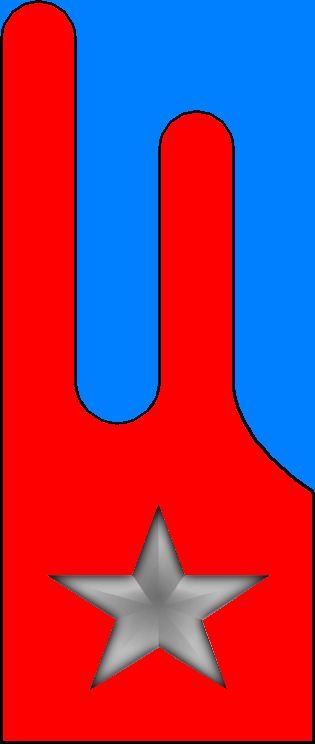
- Tank units gorget patches

The 32nd Tank Regiment (Italian: 32° Reggimento Carri) is a tank regiment of the Italian Army based in Tauriano in Friuli-Venezia Giulia. The regiment is equipped with Ariete C1 main battle tanks and assigned to the 132nd Armored Brigade "Ariete". On 15 September 1936, the Royal Italian Army formed the 2nd Tank Infantry Regiment, which on 1 December 1938, was renamed 32nd Tank Infantry Regiment and assigned to the II Armored Brigade. In January 1941, the regiment deployed to North Africa, where it fought in the Western Desert campaign in Libya and Egypt. In December 1941, the depleted regiment was taken out of the front and its place in the Ariete division taken by the 132nd Tank Infantry Regiment.

In September 1942, the regiment was reformed in mainland Italy and then sent to the island of Sardinia. After the announcement of the Armistice of Cassibile on 8 September 1943, the regiment joined the Italian Co-belligerent Army. In March 1944, the regiment was split to reform the 132nd Tank Infantry Regiment. However, at the end of August 1944 both regiments were disbanded. In 1964, the Italian Army reformed the regiment and assigned it to the Armored Division "Ariete". In 1975, the regiment was disbanded and its flag and traditions were assigned to the 3rd Tank Battalion "M.O. Galas", which had become an autonomous unit on 1 October 1975. In 1992, the 3rd Tank Battalion "M.O. Galas" lost its autonomy and entered the reformed 32nd Tank Regiment.

Originally the unit, like all Italian tank units, was part of the army's infantry arm, but on 1 June 1999 the tankers specialty was transferred from the infantry arm to the cavalry arm. Consequently, on the same date the regiment replaced its flag with a cavalry standard. The regiment's anniversary falls on 8 February, the last day of the Battle of Beda Fomm, during which the remnants of the III Tank Battalion M13/40 fought until the battalion's total annihilation, for which the battalion was awarded Italy's highest military honor the Gold Medal of Military Valor.

== History ==
=== Interwar years ===
On 1 October 1927, the Royal Italian Army reorganized its Armed Tanks Formation Center in Rome and formed the Armed Tanks Regiment (Italian: Reggimento carri armati) as central training unit for the army's tank battalions. On 15 September 1936, the Armed Tanks Regiment was split into four tank infantry regiments, which had training and administrative functions:

- 1st Tank Infantry Regiment, in Vercelli
- 2nd Tank Infantry Regiment, in Verona
- 3rd Tank Infantry Regiment, in Bologna
- 4th Tank Infantry Regiment, in Rome

The 2nd Tank Infantry Regiment received four battalions from the disbanded regiment and formed a depot, which included training and maintenance units. The four battalions, like all tank battalions at the time, were named for infantry officers, who had served in World War I and been awarded posthumously Italy's highest military honor the Gold Medal of Military Valor. The regiment consisted of the following units after its founding:

- 2nd Tank Infantry Regiment, in Verona
  - III Breach Tanks Battalion "Matter", in Verona
  - IV Assault Tanks Battalion "Monti", in Bolzano
  - V Assault Tanks Battalion "Venezian", in Trieste
  - XI Assault Tanks Battalion "Gregorutti", in Udine
  - 2nd Training Center, in Verona
  - 2nd Maintenance Workshop, in Verona

The assault tanks battalions were initially equipped with L3/33 tankettes, which were soon replaced by slightly improved L3/35 tankettes, while the breach tanks battalion fielded Fiat 3000 light tanks. In 1938, the regiment added the XXII Assault Tanks Battalion "Coralli", which was based in Trento. The same year the Assault Tank Battalions were renamed Tank Battalion L (with L standing for Italian: "Leggero" or Light), while Breach Tanks Battalions were renamed Tank Battalion M (with M standing for Italian: "Medio" or Medium).

On 30 November 1938, the 1st Tank Infantry Regiment transferred the IV Tank Battalion M to the 2nd Tank Infantry Regiment, the 3rd Tank Infantry Regiment transferred the XXI Tank Battalion L to the 2nd Tank Infantry Regiment, and the 4th Tank Infantry Regiment transferred the V Tank Battalion M to the 2nd Tank Infantry Regiment. On 1 December 1938, the 2nd Tank Infantry Regiment was reorganized as an operational unit and renamed 32nd Tank Infantry Regiment. The regiment was assigned to the II Armored Brigade. On the same day, the 32nd Tank Infantry Regiment transferred the IV Tank Battalion L and XXII Tank Battalion L to the 1st Tank Infantry Regiment, and the V Tank Battalion L and XI Tank Battalion L to the 3rd Tank Infantry Regiment. Upon entering the 32nd Tank Infantry Regiment the tank battalions M were renumbered and moved to the regiment's expanded base in Montorio Veronese near Verona. Afterwards the regiment consisted of the following units:

- 32nd Tank Infantry Regiment, in Verona
  - XXI Tank Battalion L
  - CCCXXI Tank Battalion M (former III Tank Battalion M)
  - CCCXXII Tank Battalion M (former IV Tank Battalion M)
  - CCCXXIII Tank Battalion M (former V Tank Battalion M)
  - 32nd Training Center
  - 32nd Maintenance Workshop

On 1 February 1939, the II Armored Brigade was disbanded and the 32nd Tank Infantry Regiment, 8th Bersaglieri Regiment and newly formed 132nd Armored Artillery Regiment were assigned to the newly formed 132nd Armored Division "Ariete". On 23 September 1939, the regiment received the III Tank Battalion L from the 1st Tank Infantry Regiment and in turn transferred, on 1 November 1939, the CCCXXIII Tank Battalion M to the 1st Tank Infantry Regiment. At the same time the two remaining tank battalions M replaced their Fiat 3000 light tanks with M11/39 tanks. In April 1940, the CCCXXI and CCCXXII tank battalions were renumbered as I and II tank battalions M11/39, while the XXI Tank Battalion L was renumbered IV Tank Battalion L.

=== World War II ===
On 10 June 1940, the day Italy entered World War II the regiment consisted of the following units:

- 32nd Tank Infantry Regiment, in Verona
  - I Tank Battalion M11/39
  - II Tank Battalion M11/39
  - III Tank Battalion L
  - IV Tank Battalion L

On 1 August 1940, the regiment received the I and II tank battalions L from the 1st Tank Infantry Regiment, while transferring its I and II tank battalion M11/39 to the 4th Tank Infantry Regiment, with which the two battalions deployed to Libya for the Italian invasion of Egypt. As replacement the depot of the regiment in Verona formed the III Tank Battalion M13/40, followed, on 8 October 1940, by the IV Tank Battalion M13/40, and, on 11 November 1940, the V Tank Battalion M13/40. Each of the three battalions fielded 37 M13/40 tanks. At the same time the III and IV tank battalions L were disbanded. In fall 1940, the III Tank Battalion M13/40 was sent to Libya to bolster Italian forces in Egypt.

On 9 December 1940, the British Western Desert Force commenced Operation Compass and the II Tank Battalion M11/39 was destroyed on the same day during the British Attack on Nibeiwa. On 13 December 1940, the V Tank Battalion M13/40 embarked in Naples and sailed for Libya. On 10 January 1941, the battalion was assigned to the Special Armored Brigade and arrived on the front on 15 January. On 21–22 January 1941, the I Tank Battalion M11/39 was destroyed during the British capture of Tobruk. On 24 January 1941, the III, V, VI, and XXI tank battalions M13/40 clashed with the British 7th Armoured Division in the action at Mechili. The end for the remnants of the Italian 10th Army came on 6–7 February 1941, when their retreat was blocked by the 7th Armoured Division at Beda Fomm and the furious attempts of the Italian tank battalions to open a breach in the British line during the Battle of Beda Fomm came to naught. By 7 February 1941 the Italian 10th Army with all its units and all the reinforcements sent to it had been destroyed or captured by the British XIII Corps. On 8 February 1941, the III and V tank battalions M13/40 were declared lost due to wartime events.

For their valor and sacrifice during Operation Compass the III Tank Battalion M13/40 was awarded a Gold Medal of Military Valor, while the V Tank Battalion M13/40 was awarded a Silver Medal of Military Valor. Until 1975 both medals were affixed to the 32nd Tank Regiment's flag. When the V Tank Battalion became an autonomous unit in 1975 the Silver Medal of Valor awarded to the battalion was transferred to the battalion's flag and added to the battalion's coat of arms.

Due to the deteriorating situation on the Greco-Italian front, the 32nd Tank Infantry Regiment's IV Tank Battalion M13/40 was sent in January 1942 to Albania, where the battalion was attached to the 31st Tank Infantry Regiment of the 131st Armored Division "Centauro".

==== Western Desert campaign ====
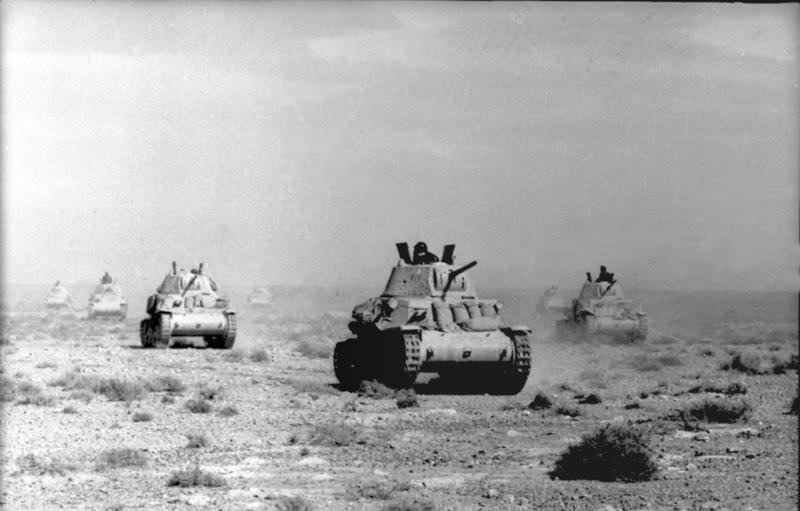
32nd Tank Infantry Regiment M13/40 tanks in May 1941

On 22 January, the day British forces captured of Tobruk, the 32nd Tank Infantry Regiment, together with the entire 132nd Armored Division "Ariete", embarked in Naples and sailed for Tripoli in Libya where the division arrived on 24 January, the day British spearheads engaged the last Italian units in Cyrenaica. After arriving in Libya the 32nd Tank Infantry Regiment was in no shape to contest the British advance as it consisted of the I, II, and III tank battalions L with obsolete L3 tankettes. The first useful M13/40 tanks joined the regiment in late February 1941 with the VII Tank Battalion M13/40, which had been formed on 30 January 1941 by regiment's depot in Verona with the personnel of the disbanded IV Tank Battalion L. The regiment also received an anti-tank company with German 3.7 cm Pak 36 anti-tank cannons. In early April 1941, the VIII Tank Battalion M13/40 formed by the 4th Tank Infantry Regiment arrived in Libya and joined the regiment, which at the time was fighting in Operation Sonnenblume. The battalion joined the regiment on 15–18 May in the area of Sallum, where the regiment was held in reserve during the British Operation Brevity. The regiment then participated in the Axis Siege of Tobruk. On 21 July 1941, the IX Tank Battalion M13/40 formed by the 3rd Tank Infantry Regiment arrived at the front and joined the regiment.

As the regiment's L3/35 tankettes were useless the Ariete division's commander General Ettore Baldassarre demanded repeatedly to be sent M13/40 tanks to re-equip the regiment's three tank battalions L or be sent additional tank battalions M. Ultimately the High Command in Rome settled on a plan to repatriate the men of the three tank battalions L and retrain them at the 32nd Tank Infantry Regiment's depot in Verona. Therefore on 15 June 1941, the depot of the 4th Tank Infantry Regiment formed the regimental command and a command company for the newly formed 132nd Tank Infantry Regiment, which was sent immediately to Libya, where the new regiment joined the 132nd Armored Division "Ariete". On 31 August 1941, the VII, VIII, and IX tank battalions M13/40 left the 32nd Tank Infantry Regiment and the next day, on 1 September 1941, the three battalions joined the 132nd Tank Infantry Regiment. The 32nd Tank Infantry Regiment then continued to fight in North Africa with only its three tank battalions L as the units return to Italy was repeatedly postponed.

On 28 August 1941, the depot of the 32nd Tank Infantry Regiment formed the XIII Tank Battalion M13/40, which was assigned to the 31st Tank Infantry Regiment. In October 1941, the regiment contributed with some of its personnel to the formation of the LII Tank Battalion M13/40, which was formed in Libya and assigned to the Maneuver Army Corps as corps reconnaissance asset. On 18 November 1941, the British Eighth Army commenced Operation Crusader and on 19 November the British 22nd Armoured Brigade attacked Bir el Gubi. The Ariete division repulsed the attack and then moved towards Sidi Rezegh, where on 29 November the Ariete pushed the 2nd New Zealand Division back in the Battle of Point 175. On 6 December 1941, the Ariete division headed back to Bir el Gubi, where a second British attack on Bir el Gubi was repulsed. The same day General Erwin Rommel ordered his forces to retreat to the Gazala line, where in December the Ariete division continued the fight against the British advance. During the night of 15–16 December Axis forces abandoned the Gazala line and retreated to El Agheila. The Ariete division had lost 76% of its personnel during Operation Crusader and the 32nd Tank Infantry Regiment was taken out of the front on 31 December 1941 and sent to the rear.

On 8 January 1942, the 32nd Tank Infantry Regiment ceded part of its remaining personnel to help bring the 132nd Tank Infantry Regiment back up to strength, and, on 16 January 1942, the regiment ceded all of its remaining troops and equipment to the 12th Auto Grouping in Tripoli to form a Tank Training Center. Afterwards the regiment's command and flag left Libya and returned to Verona, where they arrived on 20 February 1942.

==== Sardinia ====
On 20 September 1942, the regiment's command company was reformed and the regiment was then sent to Sanluri on the island of Sardinia, where the regiment was assigned the II Tank Battalion L, which had been part of the 33rd Tank Infantry Regiment and was equipped with L3/35 tankettes, the XIII Tank Battalion L, which had been based in Sardinia since its formation on the island in 1939, and the CC Tank Battalion SOMUA, which had been formed by the 4th Tank Infantry Regiment and was equipped with captured French SOMUA S35 cavalry tanks. The regiment was assigned to the XIII Army Corps, which was tasked with the defence of the Southern part of the island. In October 1942, the XIII Army Corps assigned the 32nd Tank Infantry Regiment to the army corps' Motorized-Armored Grouping and reinforced the regiment with four Motorcycle Machine Gunners companies. In November 1942, the XIII Tank Battalion L participated in the occupation of Corsica, which was part of the German-Italian Operation Anton to occupy Vichy France.

During the year 1943, the regiment was reinforced on 23 March with the DLXI Self-propelled Group, which was equipped with Semovente da 75/18 self-propelled guns, on 6 May with the XVI Tank Battalion M14/41, which had been formed by the regiment's depot in Verona and was equipped with M14/41 tanks, and on 27 June with the XVIII Tank Battalion M15/42, which had been assigned to the 33rd Tank Infantry Regiment and was equipped with M15/42 tanks. The regiment had now the following organization:

- 32nd Tank Infantry Regiment, in Sanluri
  - II Tank Battalion L, with L3/35 tankettes
  - XVI Tank Battalion M14/41, with M14/41 tanks
  - XVIII Tank Battalion M15/42, with M15/42 tanks
  - CC Tank Battalion SOMUA, with SOMUA S35 cavalry tanks
  - DLXI Self-propelled Group, with Semovente da 75/18 self-propelled guns
  - 8th, 9th, 11th, and 13th motorcycle machine gunners companies

In the evening of 8 September 1943, the Armistice of Cassibile, which ended hostilities between the Kingdom of Italy and the Anglo-American Allies, was announced by General Dwight D. Eisenhower on Radio Algiers and by Marshal Pietro Badoglio on Italian radio. Germany reacted by invading Italy and German forces quickly disbanded the regiment's depot in Verona, while the 32nd Tank Infantry Regiment remained passive as the German 90. Panzergrenadier-Division and other German forces evacuated Sardinia. The regiment remained in Sardinia and joined the Italian Co-belligerent Army. As Italian forces had to leave Corsica the regiment added three tank and self-propelled battalions, which had been based on the French island. On 20 March 1944, the regiment was split and the next day, on 21 March 1944, the 132nd Tank Infantry Regiment was reformed in Sanluri. The 32nd Tank Infantry Regiment now consisted of the following units:

- 32nd Tank Infantry Regiment, in Sanluri
  - I Tank Battalion M14/41 (former XVI Tank Battalion M14/41)
  - II Tank Battalion M15/42 (former XVIII Tank Battalion M15/42)
  - III Tank Battalion SOMUA (former CC Tank Battalion SOMUA)
  - IV Motorcycle Machine Gunners Battalion (former 8th and 9th motorcycle machine gunners companies)
  - V Self-propelled Battalion 75/18 (former DLXI Self-propelled Battalion 75/18)

On 15 May 1944, the Italian Co-belligerent Army reformed the Infantry Division "Granatieri di Sardegna" in Sardinia and the 32nd Tank Infantry Regiment and 132nd Tank Infantry Regiment were assigned to the division. On 27 August 1944, the 132nd Tank Infantry Regiment was disbanded, followed on 31 August by the division and 32nd Tank Infantry Regiment. The regiment's personnel was used to form the 514th Guards Battalion, which guarded British Eighth Army installation during the Italian campaign.

=== Cold War ===
On 1 March 1964, the 32nd Tank Regiment was reformed in Cordenons and assigned to the II Armored Brigade "Ariete" of the Armored Division "Ariete". On 1 July of the same year, the regiment formed the III Tank Battalion and the V Tank Battalion. The two battalions were equipped with M47 Patton tanks. On the same day the Gold Medal of Military Valor awarded to the III Tank Battalion M13/40 and the Silver Medal of Military Valor awarded to the V Tank Battalion M13/40 were affixed to the regiment's flag. On 20 October 1964, the regiment added the XXIII Bersaglieri Battalion, which was equipped with M113 armored personnel carriers. In 1968, the regiment moved from Cordenons to Tauriano and, on 1 October of the same year, the headquarter of the II Armored Brigade "Ariete" was disbanded and the regiment came under direct command of the division.

During the 1975 army reform the army disbanded the regimental level and newly independent battalions were granted for the first time their own flags, respectively in the case of cavalry units, their own standard. On 30 September 1975, the 32nd Tank Regiment was disbanded and the next day the regiment's III Tank Battalion became an autonomous unit and was renamed 3rd Tank Battalion "M.O. Galas". As part of the reform tank and armored battalions were named for officers, soldiers and partisans of the tank specialty, who had served in World War II and been awarded Italy's highest military honor the Gold Medal of Military Valor. The 3rd Tank Battalion was named for Sergeant Bruno Galas, who, while serving with the III Tank Battalion M13/40 in North Africa, was gravely injured on 1 January 1941 during the Battle of Bardia and died two days later, on 3 January, in an Italian field hospital.

On the same date, 1 October 1975, the regiment's V Tank Battalion became an autonomous unit and was renamed 5th Tank Battalion "M.O. Chiamenti", while the XXIII Bersaglieri Battalion became an autonomous unit and was renamed 23rd Bersaglieri Battalion "Castel di Borgo". The three battalions were then assigned to the 32nd Armored Brigade "Mameli", which was formed on the same day by reorganizing the command of the 32nd Tank Regiment. Both tank battalions consisted of a command, a command and services company, and three tank companies with M60A1 Patton main battle tanks. Each of the two battalions fielded now 434 men (32 officers, 82 non-commissioned officers, and 320 soldiers). On 12 November 1976, the President of the Italian Republic Giovanni Leone assigned with decree 846 the flag and traditions of the 32nd Tank Regiment to the 3rd Tank Battalion "M.O. Galas" and granted the 5th Tank Battalion "M.O. Chiamenti" a new flag, to which the battalions Silver Medal of Military Valor was affixed.

For its conduct and work after the 1976 Friuli earthquake the 3rd Tank Battalion "M.O. Galas" was awarded a Silver Medal of Army Valor, which was affixed to the battalion's flag and added to the battalion's coat of arms.

=== Recent times ===
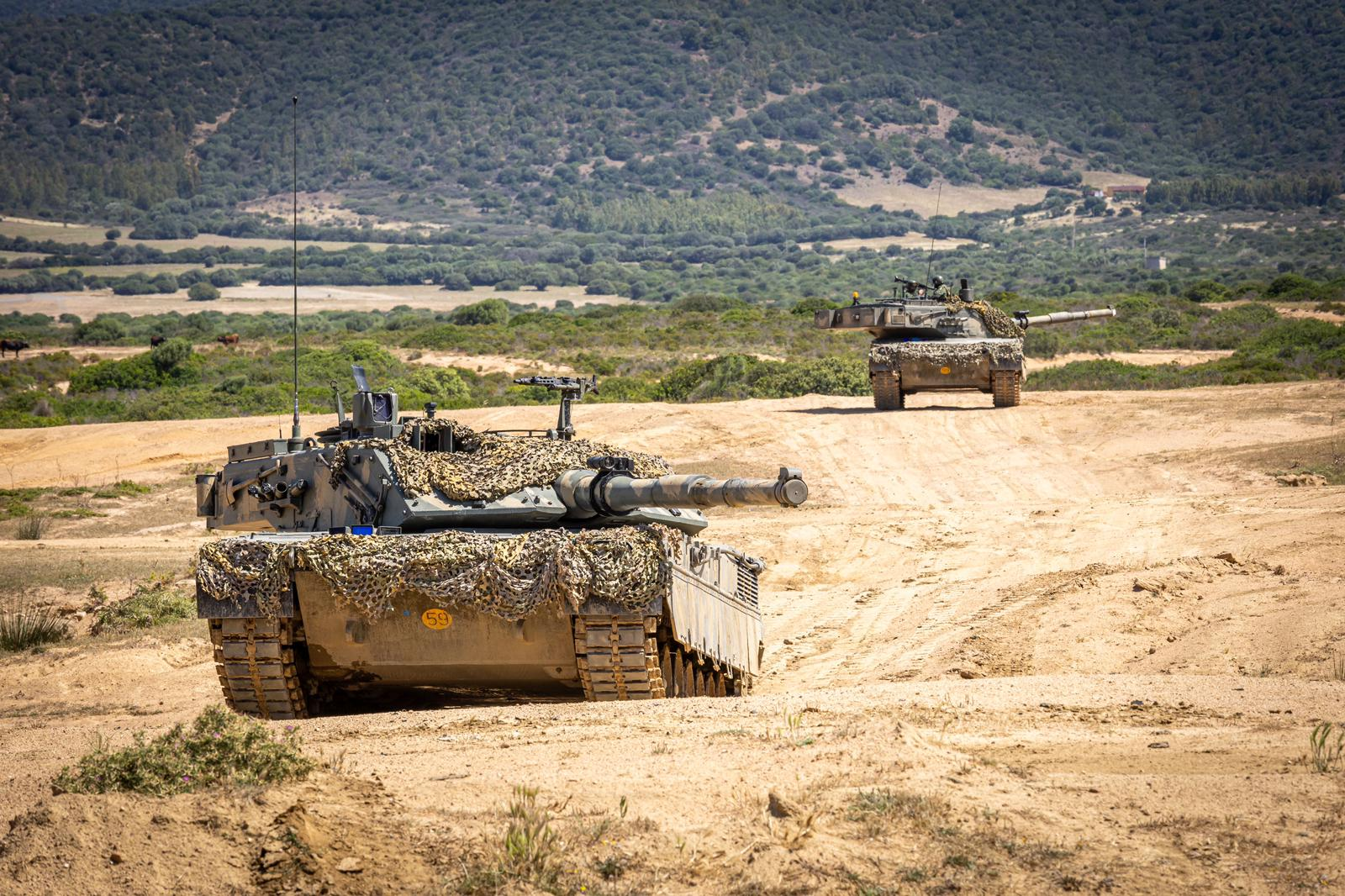
32nd Tank Regiment Ariete C1 main battle tanks during an exercise at Capo Teulada in 2024

After the end of the Cold War Italian Army began to draw down its forces and, on 1 April 1991, the 32nd Armored Brigade "Mameli" was disbanded, while the 3rd Tank Battalion "M.O. Galas", 5th Tank Battalion "M.O. Chiamenti", and 23rd Bersaglieri Battalion "Castel di Borgo" were transferred to the 132nd Armored Brigade "Ariete". On 25 August 1992, the 5th Tank Battalion "M.O. Chiamenti" was disbanded, while the 3rd Tank Battalion "M.O. Galas" lost its autonomy. The next day, on 26 August 1992, the personnel of the disbanded 5th Tank Battalion "M.O. Chiamenti" was merged into the 3rd Tank Battalion "M.O. Galas", which on the same date entered the reformed 32nd Tank Regiment.

On 1 June 1999, the tankers specialty was transferred from the infantry arm to the cavalry arm. Consequently, on the same date the regiment replaced its flag with a cavalry standard. Between 29 December 1992 and 15 March 1994, the 32nd Tank Regiment served with the United Nations Operation in Somalia II, for which the regiment was awarded a Bronze Medal of Army Valor, which was affixed to the regiment's flag and added to the regiment's coat of arms.

== Organization ==
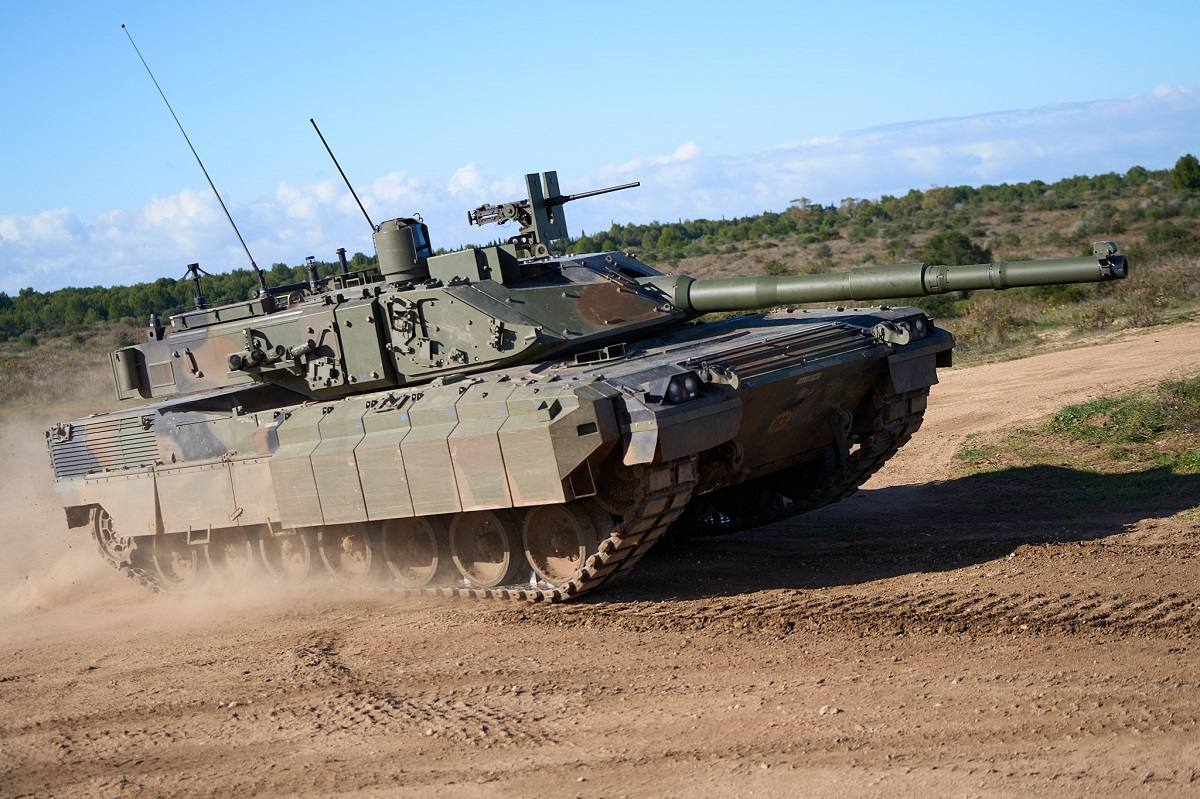
Ariete C2 main battle tank during a crew training exercise

32nd Tank Regiment Ariete main battle tanks during an exercise

As of 2025 the 32nd Tank Regiment is organized as follows:

- 32nd Tank Regiment, in Tauriano
  - Command and Logistic Support Company
  - 3rd Tank Battalion "M.O. Galas"
    - 1st Tank Company
    - 2nd Tank Company
    - 3rd Tank Company
    - 4th Tank Company (Suspended due to a lack of tanks)

The regiment is equipped with Ariete C1 main battle tanks, which are being replaced by Ariete C2 main battle tanks.

== See also ==
- 132nd Armored Brigade "Ariete"

== Sources ==
- Montanari, Mario (1993). Le Operazioni in Africa Settentrionale: Tobruk (Marzo 1941 – Gennaio 1942) Parte Seconda [Operations in North Africa: Tobruk (March 1941 – January 1942) Second Part]. Vol. II (2nd [online scan] ed.). Roma: Esercito Italiano Ufficio Storico. OCLC 885609741 – via issuu.
