= Valentino Babini =

Italian general during World War II

- Born: 5 December 1889; Novi di Modena, Kingdom of Italy
- Died: 29 December 1952 (aged 63)
- Military career
- Allegiance: Kingdom of Italy; Italy
- Branch: Royal Italian Army; Italian Army
- Rank: Lieutenant General
- Commands: 3rd Tank Infantry Regiment; Tank and Specialist Units Group; Flechas Negras Division; Libya Tank Command; Babini Group "Aosta" Infantry Division
- Conflicts: Italo-Turkish War; Battle of Tripoli; Battle of Zanzur; First Italo-Senussi War; World War I; White War; Battle of Caporetto; Pacification of Libya; Spanish Civil War; Aragon Offensive; Battle of the Ebro; World War II; North African campaign; Italian invasion of Egypt; Battle of Mechili; Battle of Beda Fomm
- Awards: Silver Medal of Military Valor (three times); Bronze Medal of Military Valor; Military Order of Italy; Order of the Crown of Italy

Valentino Babini (5 December 1889 – 29 December 1952) was an Italian general during World War II. He was one Italy's foremost pioneers in tank warfare and among the most important tank commanders of the Royal Italian Army during the interwar period and the early stages of World War II; in 1940 he coined the motto of Italy's tank troops, Ferrea mole, ferreo cuore ("Iron hulls, iron hearts").

== Biography ==
He was born in Novi di Modena on 5 December 1889, and enlisted in the Royal Italian Army on 3 November 1907, entering the Royal Military Academy of Infantry and Cavalry of Modena. He graduated in 1909 with the rank of infantry second lieutenant, assigned to 70th Infantry Regiment. In 1911 he was transferred to the 84th Infantry Regiment "Venezia", and with this unit he took part in the initial phases of the Italo-Turkish War, distinguishing himself in October 1911 during the consolidation of the Tripoli bridgehead, and subsequently in Bu Meliana, Zanzur and Sciara Zauri. In 1912 he was promoted to lieutenant, and in March 1913 he was awarded the Bronze Medal of Military Valor. After returning to Italy he participated in a course for airship pilots, but with the entry of the Kingdom of Italy into World War I, on 24 May 1915, he returned to the infantry as company commander.

On 8 August of the same year he was promoted to captain, and on 29 October he distinguished himself in the fighting on the Col di Lana (where he led an assault that resulted in the capture of an Austro-Hungarian position and was wounded in action), earning a Silver Medal of Military Valor. During 1917 he was promoted to major, and on 3 November of the same year, during the retreat that followed the battle of Caporetto, he distinguished himself in the defense of the bridge of Pinzano, on the Tagliamento, halting the Austro-Hungarian advance enough to prevent the encirclement of a retreating infantry brigade and earning a second silver medal for military valor.

On 5 December 1921 he returned to Cyrenaica to take part in the pacification of the colony, returning to Italy in October 1925. On 12 December of the same year he was assigned to the Tank Unit (Reparto Carri Armati) where he spent the next twelve years, continuing his military career with promotions to lieutenant colonel (1926) and colonel (31 December 1936); in 1937 he was appointed commander of the 3rd Tank Infantry Regiment.

On 25 April 1937 he volunteered for the Spanish Civil War as commander of the Tank and Specialist Units Group, distinguishing himself during the battle of Aragon in March 1938. On 2 October 1938 he was awarded a third silver medal for Military Valor, then assuming command of the Flechas Negras Division, and on 16 February 1939 he was promoted to the rank of brigadier general for war merits. He returned to Italy in June of that year, and in September he left for Libya, where he was appointed deputy commander of the 61st Infantry Division Sirte.

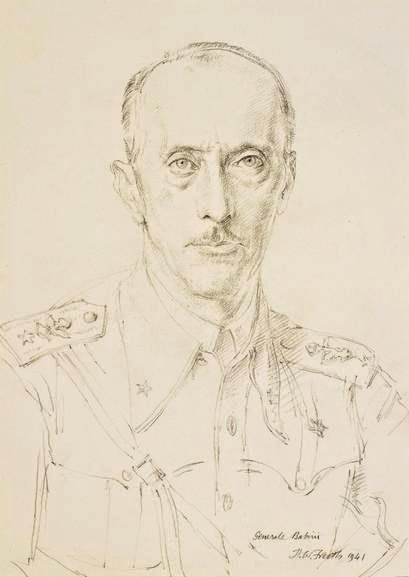
Portrait of Babini in captivity by Andrew Freeth

On 29 August 1940 he assumed command of all Italian armored forces in Libya (Comando carri della Libia, Libya Tank Command), consisting of seven battalions of L3/35 light tanks and two battalions of M11/39 medium tanks. The units under his command supported the advance of the 10th Army of Marshal of Italy Rodolfo Graziani towards Sidi Barrani, and immediately after the end of the offensive they were grouped into a special armored brigade which took the name of its commander. In December 1940, General Wavell launched the British counter-offensive known as Operation Compass, routing the Tenth Army; the Babini brigade covered the retreat of the Army, facing British tank forces in the battle of Mechili, but after an unsuccessful attempt to break through British forces blocking the Via Balbia, was destroyed in the battle of Beda Fomm on 7 February 1941, where Babini was taken prisoner along with the remnants of his brigade and of the Tenth Army.

He remained in British captivity until after the end of the war, returning to Italy in 1946; upon return he was promoted to the rank of Major General, with seniority from 1 July 1942, and then to Lieutenant General in 1947. In the same year he was among the founders of the National Tank Veterans Association, but on 7 July 1947 he was forcibly discharged from the Army for having participated in the Spanish Civil War in the ranks of the Fascist forces. He was however readmitted into service on 14 October 1949, on the decision of Minister of Defense Randolfo Pacciardi (who had fought on the other side during the Spanish Civil War), assuming command of the "Aosta" Infantry Division, and in 1950 the post of Inspector General of the Infantry. In March 1952 he became Vice President of the Army Section of the Superior Council of the Armed Forces, but on December 29 of the same year he was killed in a car crash.
