= 3rd Armored Infantry Regiment (Italy) =

Inactive Italian Army tank unit

- 3° Reggimento Fanteria Corazzato
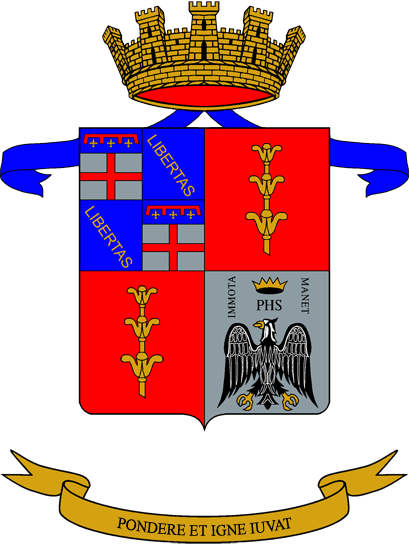
- Regimental coat of arms
- Active: 1 Oct. 1927 — 8 Sept. 1943; 1 Oct. 1964 — 10 Sept. 1991; 13 July 1992 — 29 Sept. 1995
- Country: Italy
- Branch: Italian Army
- Part of: Infantry Division "Granatieri di Sardegna"
- Garrison/HQ: Persano
- Motto: "Pondere et igne iuvat"
- Anniversaries: 5 January 1941
- Decorations: 2x Bronze Medals of Military Valor

Insignia
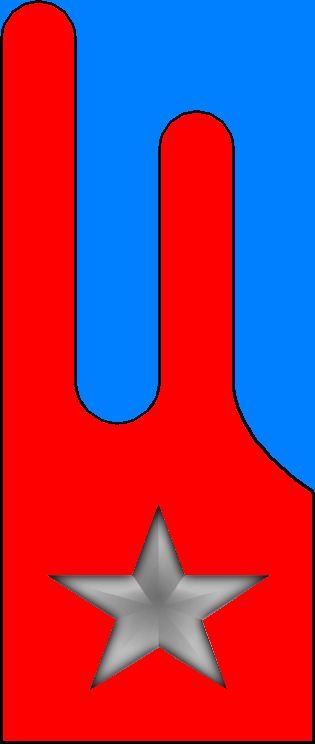
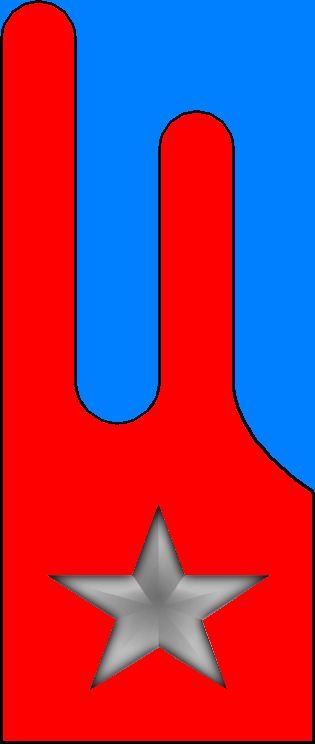
- Tank units gorget patches

The 3rd Armored Infantry Regiment (Italian: 3° Reggimento Fanteria Corazzato) is an inactive armored warfare regiment of the Italian Army, which was based in Persano in Campania and last operationally assigned to the Infantry Division "Granatieri di Sardegna". The regiment was formed in 1927 as Armed Tanks Regiment. In 1936 the regiment was split into four tank infantry regiments and the 3rd Tank Infantry Regiment was assigned the flag and traditions of the Armed Tanks Regiment. During World War II the regiment served as central training command for all Italian tank units. The regiment was disbanded by invading German forces after the announcement of the Armistice of Cassibile on 8 September 1943.

In 1964, the regiment was reformed as 3rd Armored Infantry Regiment and assigned to the Infantry Division "Granatieri di Sardegna". In 1975, the regiment was disbanded and its flag and traditions transferred to the 9th Armored Battalion "M.O. Butera", which was assigned to the Motorized Brigade "Acqui". In 1991, the battalion was disbanded and the flag of the 3rd Armored Infantry Regiment transferred to the Shrine of the Flags in the Vittoriano in Rome for safekeeping. From 1992 to 1995 the 9th Armored Battalion "M.O. Butera" was again active as a training support unit at the Monte Romano training range. Originally the unit, like all Italian tank units, was part of the army's infantry arm, but on 1 June 1999 the tankers specialty was transferred from the infantry arm to the cavalry arm. The regiment's anniversary falls on 5 January 1941, the day the last survivors of the regiment's IX Tank Battalion L surrendered to British forces after having fought to annihilation in the Battle of Bardia, for which the battalion was awarded Bronze Medal of Military Valor.

== History ==
=== Interwar years ===
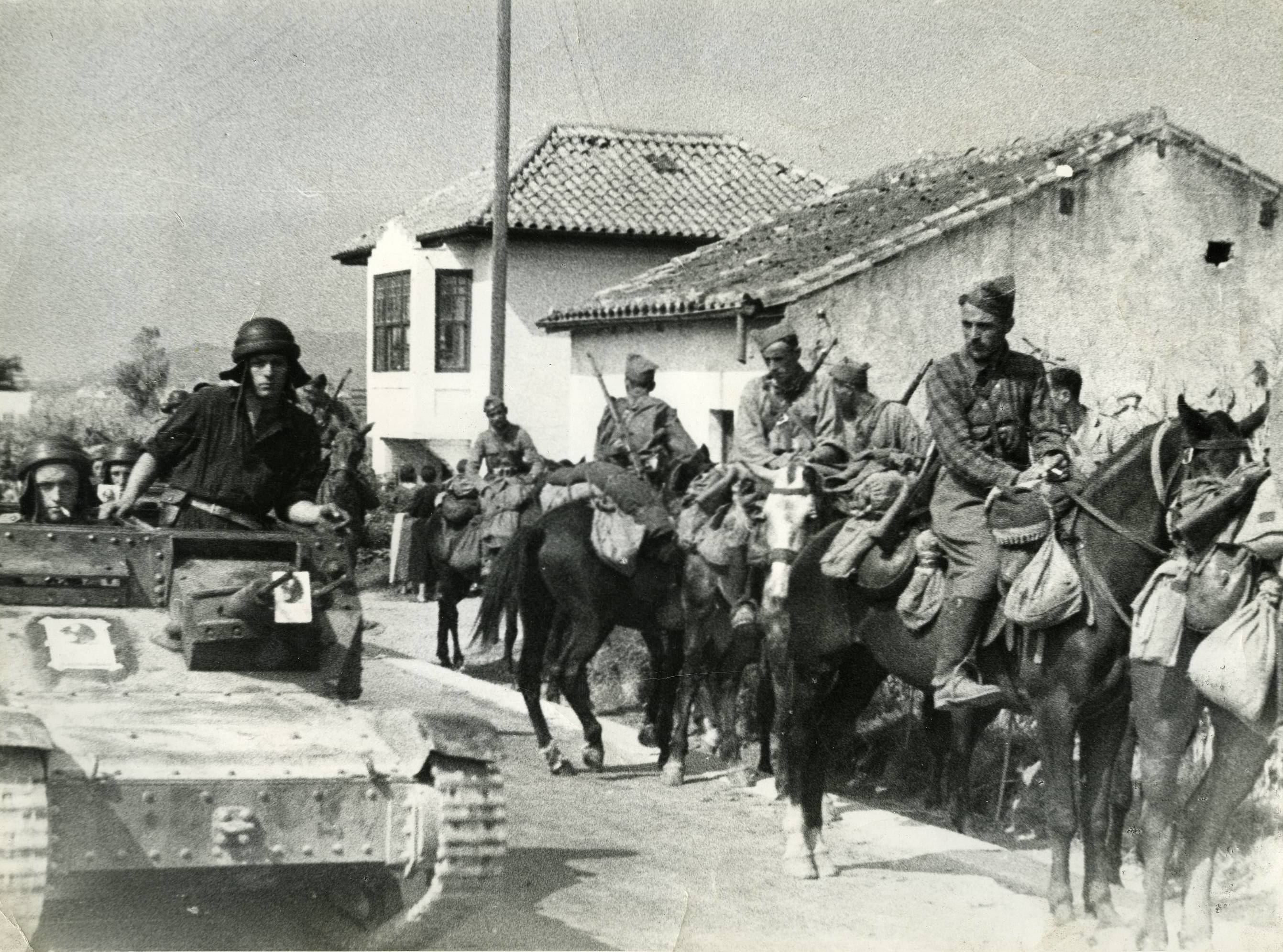
Italian L3/35 tankette during the Spanish Civil War

On 1 October 1927, the Royal Italian Army reorganized its Armed Tanks Formation Center in Rome and formed the Armed Tanks Regiment (Italian: Reggimento carri armati) as central training unit for the army's tank battalions. Initially the regiment, which had training and administrative functions, consisted of five tank battalions and one armored cars machine gun battalion, which was yet to be formed. The tank battalions were equipped with Fiat 3000 mod. 21 light tanks, while the armored cars machine gun battalion was to receive Lancia 1ZM armored cars. On 28 August 1928, the regiment's IV Battalion moved from Rome to Udine, and, on 1 September of the same year, the V Battalion moved from Rome to Codroipo. On 5 January 1931, the V Battalion moved from Codroipo to Bologna, as on 15 January the armored cars machine gun battalion was finally formed in Rome and then transferred to Codroipo. On 1 October of the same year, the regimental command and depot, which included training and maintenance units, moved from Rome to Bologna.

On 20 May 1932, the III Battalion moved from Rome to Bassano del Grappa, which left only the I and II battalions in Rome. On 28 June 1934, the regiment formed with parts ceded by its tank battalions, the Fast Tanks Squadron, which on 1 September of the same year was transferred to Italian Eritrea. On 22 August 1934, the III Battalion left Bassano del Grappa and moved to Mantua and one year later to Brescia. In 1933 the production of the CV33 tankette (with CV standing for Italian: "Carro Veloce" or Fast Tank) commenced and by 1934 full rate production was underway. Consequently the regimental depot in Bologna began to form assault tank battalions, which were intended as support units for the army's corps formations. At the time all tank battalions were named for infantry officers, who had served in World War I and been awarded posthumously Italy's highest military honor the Gold Medal of Military Valor. To distinguish the battalions equipped with CV33 tankettes from the battalions equipped with Fiat 3000 light tanks the latter were redesignated as breach tanks battalions.

In early 1935 the regiment's depot formed the IV Assault Tanks Battalion "Monti", which moved to Bolzano and supported the IV Army Corps, the V Assault Tanks Battalion "Suarez" (later renamed "Venezian"), which moved to Trieste and supported the V Army Corps, the VI Assault Tanks Battalion "Lollini", which moved to Treviso and supported the VI Army Corps, and XI Assault Tanks Battalion "Gregorutti", which moved to Udine and supported the XI Army Corps. In June 1935, the depot formed the XXI Assault Tanks Battalion "Trombi", XXII Assault Tanks Battalion "Coralli", and XXXII Assault Tanks Battalion "Battisti", which were transferred to Italian Libya on garrison duty for the duration of the Second Italo-Ethiopian War. In September of the same year, the depot formed the XX Assault Tanks Battalion "Randaccio", which was transferred to Italian Eritrea, where it fought in the Second Italo-Ethiopian War.

In March 1936, the regiment's depot formed the XXIII Assault Tanks Battalion "Stennio" and the XXXI Assault Tanks Battalion "Cerboni" for service in Libya. On 10 May 1936, the depot formed the IX Assault Tanks Battalion "Guadagni", which moved to Bari and supported the IX Army Corps, and on 13 May the depot formed the Assault Tanks Company Sardinia, which was sent to the island of Sardinia. On 15 June 1936, the depot formed the VII Assault Tanks Battalion "Vezzani", which moved to Florence and supported the VII Army Corps, X Assault Tanks Battalion "Menzinger", which moved to Agnano and supported the X Army Corps and XII Assault Tanks Battalion "Cangialosi", which moved to Palermo and supported the XII Army Corps, and on 25 June the depot formed the School Battalion, which assumed all training functions. At the beginning of September 1936, the XXIII Assault Tanks Battalion "Stennio" was assigned to the 8th Infantry Division "Po", which was deployed to Libya for the duration of the Second Italo-Ethiopian War.

On 15 September 1936, the Armed Tanks Regiment was split into four tank infantry regiments, which had training and administrative functions. The battalions of the Armed Tanks Regiment were divided among the new regiments as follows:

- 1st Tank Infantry Regiment, in Vercelli
  - I Assault Tanks Battalion "Ribet", in Turin
  - II Assault Tanks Battalion "Berardi", in Alessandria
  - III Assault Tanks Battalion "Paselli", in Monza
  - IV Breach Tanks Battalion "Prestinari", in Vercelli
  - 1st Training Center, in Vercelli
  - 1st Maintenance Workshop, in Vercelli
- 2nd Tank Infantry Regiment, in Verona
  - III Breach Tanks Battalion "Matter", in Verona
  - IV Assault Tanks Battalion "Monti", in Bolzano
  - V Assault Tanks Battalion "Venezian", in Trieste (former V Assault Tanks Battalion "Suarez")
  - XI Assault Tanks Battalion "Gregorutti", in Udine
  - 2nd Training Center, in Verona
  - 2nd Maintenance Workshop, in Verona
- 3rd Tank Infantry Regiment, in Bologna
  - I Breach Tanks Battalion "Raggi", in Bologna
  - VI Assault Tanks Battalion "Lollini", in Treviso
  - VII Assault Tanks Battalion "Vezzani", in Florence
  - XXXI Assault Tanks Battalion "Cerboni", in Bologna (transferred on 12 October 1936 to the 5th Bersaglieri Regiment)
  - School Battalion, in Bologna
  - Assault Tanks Company Sardinia, in Cagliari
  - Mechanized Company, in Zadar (with a mix of Lancia 1ZM armored cars and CV33 tankettes)
  - 3rd Maintenance Workshop, in Bologna
- 4th Tank Infantry Regiment, in Rome
  - II Breach Tanks Battalion "Alessi", in Rome
  - V Breach Tanks Battalion "Suarez", in Rome
  - VIII Assault Tanks Battalion "Bettoia", in Rome
  - IX Assault Tanks Battalion "Guadagni", in Bari
  - X Assault Tanks Battalion "Menzinger", in Agnano
  - XII Assault Tanks Battalion "Cangialosi", in Palermo
  - 4th Training Center, in Rome
  - 4th Maintenance Workshop, in Rome

The 3rd Tank Infantry Regiment was assigned the flag and traditions of the Armed Tanks Regiment and remained the central training center for all officers and ranks destined for tank units. Additionally the regiment was administratively and logistically responsible for all tank units deployed in the Italian colonies of Libya, Eritrea, and Somaliland.

In fall 1936, the regiment added the XXI Assault Tanks Battalion "Stennio", and XXXII Assault Tanks Battalion "Battisti" after the two battalions returned from Libya. The same year assault tank battalions began to receive improved L3/35 tankettes and the 3rd Tank Infantry Regiment sent the first Italian tanks and troops to Spain, where they fought on the Nationalist side in the Spanish Civil War. On 25 April 1937, Colonel Valentino Babini, who had been the commander of the 3rd Tank Infantry Regiment, arrived in Spain and took charge of the Specialized Units Grouping of the Italian Corpo Truppe Volontarie. In total Italy sent 149 L3/35 tankettes and eight Lancia 1ZM armored cars to Spain. On 15 July 1937, the regiment transferred the I Breach Tanks Battalion "Raggi" to the newly formed 31st Tank Infantry Regiment. In 1938, all Assault Tank Battalions were renamed Tank Battalion L (with L standing for Italian: "Leggero" or Light), while Breach Tanks Battalions were renamed Tank Battalion M (with M standing for Italian: "Medio" or Medium). On 1 October 1938, the regiment transferred the Mechanized Company in Zadar to the Zara Troops Command. On 30 November 1938, the regiment transferred the VII Tank Battalion L to the 31st Tank Infantry Regiment, and the XXI Tank Battalion L to the 2nd Tank Infantry Regiment, while the Tank Company L Sardinia was transferred to the 4th Tank Infantry Regiment. In turn the 2nd Tank Infantry Regiment transferred the V Tank Battalion L and XI Tank Battalion L to the 3rd Tank Infantry Regiment. On 6 November 1939, the regiment transferred the VI Tank Battalion L and XXXII Tank Battalion L to the newly formed 33rd Tank Infantry Regiment.

=== World War II ===
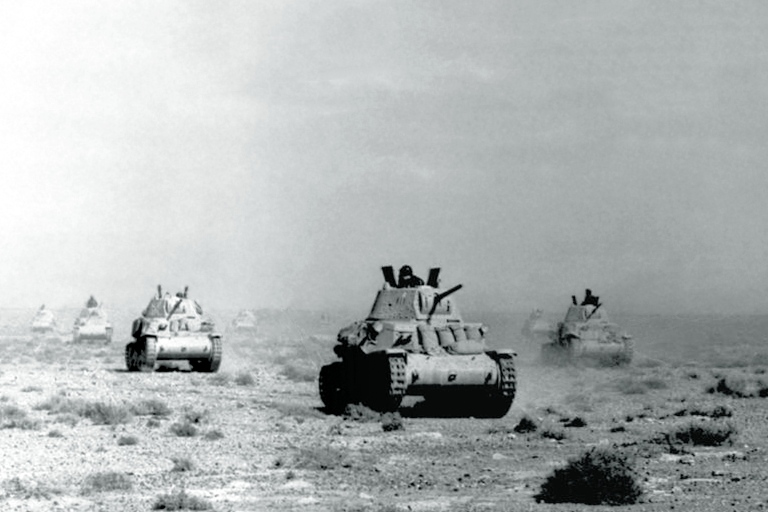
Italian M13/40 tanks in North Africa during World War II

On 10 June 1940, the day Italy entered World War II, the regiment was assigned to the reserve of the Italian 1st Army, which participated in the Italian invasion of France. At the time the 3rd Tank Infantry Regiment consisted of the following units:

- 3rd Tank Infantry Regiment, in Bologna
  - V Tank Battalion L, in Trieste
  - XI Tank Battalion L, in Udine
  - School Battalion, in Bologna
  - 3rd Maintenance Workshop, in Bologna

On 1 October 1940, the V Tank Battalion L was sent to Libya to augment the XX Army Corps, which had been part of the Italian forces that had invaded Egypt in September. Afterwards the regiment called up reservists and formed a Complements Battalion, which on 23 February 1941, was sent to Albania to help bring units fighting in the Greco–Italian War back up to full strength. At the same time the School Battalion was split into the I Complement Officer Cadets and Specialists School Battalion and the II Specialist Worker Cadets School Battalion. For the remainder of the war the regiment provided the training for all personnel destined for tank units and managed the training grounds at Bologna, Porretta, Riolo, Vergato, Asiago, and Futa. The regiment was acted as the central research and test center for the army's armored vehicles.

After its arrival in North Africa, the regiment's V Tank Battalion L was assigned to the 17th Infantry Division "Pavia", with which it fought in the Western Desert campaign. In 1941, the Pavia division was part of the Axis force besieging Tobruk, which was held by the British 70th Infantry Division. On 18 November 1941, the British Eighth Army commenced Operation Crusader, which aimed to break the Siege of Tobruk. On 23 November 1941, the 70th Infantry Division attacked the Axis siege ring and the Pavia division was sent to counterattack the British breakthrough. On 6 December 1941, General Erwin Rommel ordered a retreat to the Gazala Line. For its conduct between 23 November and 5 December 1941 the V Tank Battalion L was awarded a Bronze Medal of Military Valor, which was affixed to the flag of the 3rd Tank Infantry Regiment.

On 21 March 1941, the 3rd Tank Infantry Regiment formed the IX Tank Battalion M13/40, which was equipped with M13/40 tanks. On 21 July 1941, the battalion was transferred to Libya, where it joined the recently formed 132nd Tank Infantry Regiment. On 1 February 1942, the 3rd Tank Infantry Regiment disbanded the XI Tank Battalion L and used the battalion's personnel to form the XVIII Tank Battalion M14/41, which was equipped with M14/41 tanks and assigned on 1 July 1942 to the 33rd Tank Infantry Regiment.

In the evening of 8 September 1943, the Armistice of Cassibile, which ended hostilities between the Kingdom of Italy and the Anglo-American Allies, was announced by General Dwight D. Eisenhower on Radio Algiers and by Marshal Pietro Badoglio on Italian radio. Germany reacted by invading Italy and the 3rd Tank Infantry Regiment was disbanded soon thereafter by German forces.

During the Western Desert campaign the IX Tank Battalion L, which had been formed in 1936 and been assigned to the 4th Tank Infantry Regiment, when the Armed Tanks Regiment was split up, distinguished itself during the British Operation Compass. The battalion fought from the begin of the British offensive on 9 December 1940, until it was annihilated in the Battle of Bardia, with the battalion's survivors surrendering on 5 January 1941. For its conduct and sacrifice between 9 December 1940 and 5 January 1941 the IX Tank Battalion L was awarded Bronze Medal of Military Valor.

=== Cold War ===
On 1 October 1964, the regiment was reformed as 3rd Armored Infantry Regiment in Persano. The regiment was operationally assigned to the Infantry Division "Granatieri di Sardegna", but also provided training support to the Mechanized and Armored Troops School in Caserta. On 25 March 1965, the regiment's IX Tank Battalion in Altamura was redesignated LX Armored Battalion and assigned to the Infantry Brigade "Avellino", while on the same date the LX Armored Battalion in Salerno was transferred from the Infantry Brigade "Avellino" to the 3rd Armored Infantry Regiment and redesignated IX Tank Battalion. By 1966, the regiment consisted of the following units:

- 3rd Armored Infantry Regiment, in Persano
  - Command and Services Company, in Persano (includes an anti-tank guided missile platoon)
  - IV Bersaglieri Battalion, with M113 armored personnel carriers
  - IX Tank Battalion, in Salerno, with M47 Patton tanks
  - Squadron "Cavalleggeri di Alessandria"
  - 7th Self-propelled Battery, with M7 Priest self-propelled guns (detached on 1 January 1966 from the III Self-propelled Group, 13th Field Artillery Regiment)

During the 1975 army reform the army disbanded the regimental level and newly independent battalions were granted for the first time their own flags, respectively in the case of cavalry units, their own standard. On 30 September 1975, the 17th Infantry Regiment "Acqui" was disbanded and the next day the regiment's IV Mechanized Battalion in L'Aquila became an autonomous unit and was renamed 9th Armored Battalion "M.O. Butera". On 31 October 1975, the 3rd Armored Infantry Regiment and the IX Tank Battalion were disbanded and the next day the regiment's IV Bersaglieri Battalion became an autonomous unit and was renamed 67th Bersaglieri Battalion "Fagarè". Afterwards the 9th Armored Battalion "M.O. Butera" received the flag and traditions of the 3rd Armored Infantry Regiment and the traditions of the IX Tank Battalion L, which included the Bronze Medal of Military Valor the battalion had been awarded for its sacrifice during Operation Compass.

As part of the reform tank and armored battalions were named for officers, soldiers and partisans of the tank speciality, who had served in World War II and been awarded Italy's highest military honor the Gold Medal of Military Valor. The 9th Armored Battalion was named for Gaetano Butera, a soldiers of the 4th Tank Infantry Regiment, who had joined the Italian resistance movement after the German occupation of Italy and was murdered by the SS on 24 March 1944 in the Ardeatine massacre.

The battalion was assigned to the Motorized Brigade "Acqui" and consisted of a command, a command and services company, two tank companies with M47 Patton tanks, and a mechanized company with M113 armored personnel carriers. The battalion fielded now 536 men (34 officers, 83 non-commissioned officers, and 419 soldiers). On 12 November 1976, the President of the Italian Republic Giovanni Leone assigned with decree 846 the flag and traditions of the 3rd Armored Infantry Regiment to the 9th Armored Battalion "M.O. Butera".

=== Recent times ===
After the end of the Cold War Italian Army began to draw down its forces and, on 10 September 1991, the 9th Armored Battalion "M.O. Butera" was reduced to a reserve unit and the flag of the 3rd Armored Infantry Regiment transferred to the Shrine of the Flags in the Vittoriano in Rome for safekeeping. On 13 July 1992, the flag and traditions of the 3rd Armored Infantry Regiment were assigned to the command of the training range for armored and mechanized units at Monte Romano, which was renamed on the same day 9th Armored Battalion "M.O. Butera". On 29 September 1995, the 9th Armored Battalion "M.O. Butera" was once more disbanded and the flag of the 3rd Armored Infantry Regiment returned to the Shrine of the Flags in the Vittoriano in Rome.

== See also ==
- Motorized Brigade "Acqui"
