= Pietro Maletti =

Italian General in World War I and World War II

- Born: 24 May 1880; Castiglione delle Stiviere, Kingdom of Italy
- Died: 9 December 1940 (aged 60); Nibeiwa, Egypt
- Military career
- Allegiance: Kingdom of Italy
- Branch: Royal Italian Army
- Service years: 1898–1940
- Rank: Major General
- Commands: 2nd Colonial Brigade; 28th "Aosta" Infantry Division; Maletti Group
- Conflicts: World War I Pacification of Libya; Second Italo-Abyssinian War; World War II: Western Desert Campaign; Invasion of Egypt; Operation Compass †

Pietro Maletti (24 May 1880 – 9 December 1940) was an Italian General who participated in World War I, the Italian colonization of Libya, the Second Italo-Abyssinian War, and World War II. He was killed in action during the early stages of the North Africa Campaign.

== Early life ==
Pietro Maletti was born in Castiglione delle Stiviere, Province of Mantua, Lombardy, Kingdom of Italy.

In 1898, Maletti volunteered for the Italian Royal Army (Regio Esercito). In 1904, he was admitted to the Military Academy of Modena.

In 1909, Maletti was promoted to Lieutenant (Tenente) and, in 1914, he was promoted to Captain (Capitano).

== World War I and Libya ==
Maletti participated in World War I but, in August 1917, he was sent to Libya. With only a few brief postings elsewhere, Maletti remained in Italian North Africa (Africa Settentrionale Italiana, or ASI) until 1934 to quell Libyan resistance there. In 1926, he was promoted to Lieutenant-Colonel (Tenente Colonnello) and, in November of that year, Maletti returned to Italy for a short period of time. In 1931, may be after his participation in the campaign aiming Kufra under Rodolfo Graziani in January that year, he was promoted to Colonel (Colonnello).

== Ethiopia ==
In May 1934, Maletti again returned to Italy. But, in January 1935, he was transferred to Italian Somaliland for the Italian invasion of Ethiopia. He fought throughout the campaign on the "southern front" under the overall command of General Rodolfo Graziani. Maletti earned a promotion to Brigadier-General (Generale di Brigata).

After the fall of Gorrahei, Maletti commanded a flying column which was sent to attack a group of retreating Ethiopians. His pursuit ended when the Ethiopians were joined by a relief column and then turned on Maletti. Both sides claimed victory after some confused fighting.

After Ethiopia was defeated, Maletti stayed in Italian East Africa (Africa Orientale Italiana, or AOI) until April 1937.

Between May 18 and May 22, 1937, Italian troops under the command of Maletti massacred between 1700 and 2100 people at the Debre Libanos Monastery, including all 297 monks and 23 lay people who served the monastery, and the many pilgrims who had come to celebrate the patron saint of the monastery. The soldiers then looted the monastery carrying off crowns and robes of several of Ethiopia's past Emperors, and numerous manuscripts that have never been recovered.

== World War II ==
In June 1938, Maletti was promoted to the rank of Major General (Generale di divisione). In 1939, he was intended to assume command of the 28 Infantry Division Aosta.

On 10 June 1940, Italian dictator Benito Mussolini declared war on Britain and France. On 22 June, France fell and signed an armistice. British-occupied Egypt became the focus of the Italian forces in Libya. Maletti was diverted from his intended command and returned to North Africa (Africa Settentrionale). In Libya, he took command of a special ad hoc grouping of motorized infantry and tanks which was called the "Maletti Group" (Raggruppamento Maletti).

In September 1940, Maletti commanded this ad hoc group during the Italian invasion of Egypt. After initially becoming lost whilst making his way to the staging area, he advanced into Egypt and occupied fortified positions near Sidi Barrani.

On 9 December 1940, Maletti was killed in action at the fortified Nibeiwa Camp when British forces counterattacked during the early stages of Operation Compass. The destruction of the Maletti Group is described by Walker in Iron Hulls, Iron Hearts:

The initial British assault would fall on Nibeiwa Camp, where the only available Italian armoured unit was based, and it achieved complete surprise. Raggruppamento Maletti, or Maletti Group, under General Maletti, was an ad hoc formation consisting of 2,500 Libyan soldiers and 2 Armoured Battalion, with thirty-five M11/39 medium tanks and thirty-five L3/35 light tanks. It was earmarked for early destruction in the assault, which commenced at 05:00hr with what appeared to be no more than another raid on the eastern side of the camp. At 07:00, however, forty-eight Matilda tanks suddenly appeared from the opposite side of the camp. They struck twenty-three unmanned M11/39 tanks of the Maletti Group, which had been deployed to guard the unmined entrance to the camp. The Italians were caught completely off guard and many did not even reach their tanks, including General Maletti, who was killed emerging from his dugout. They were slaughtered and their vehicles destroyed by the British in less than ten minutes. The Italian artillery fought on valiantly, firing on the Matildas and recording many hits, some at point-blank range - but none penetrated their 70 mm of armour. The remaining Italian tanks were captured intact, and the Libyan infantry, left practically defenceless, quickly surrendered. The British had captured Nibeiwa and destroyed the only front-line Italian armoured unit in less than five hours.

Walker's indication that none of the Italian artillery were able to penetrate the armour of the Matilda tanks is confirmed by the war diaries of the British Armoured regiments and the British official histories which show that only a single Matilda was knocked out. Research by Sadkovich erroneously says that the Maletti Group's anti-armour guns were able to destroy 35 out of 57 Matildas prior to their own destruction.

Also Walker's statement that Maletti was caught completely off guard should be revised. On December 8 Maletti had already correctly alerted the nearby 2nd Libyan Division that the unusual low-level flying activity by the RAF was probably intended to mask the movement of armoured units and at 06.30 December 9th (well before the beginning of the actual main assault) he was already in contact with the commanders of both the 1st and 2nd Libyan Divisions reporting the British preparatory movements. In reality Maletti was killed at about 09.00 AM, while directing the fire from a 47/32 anti-tank guns section on the northern sector of the Nibeiwa strongpoint.

He was awarded the Gold Medal of Military Valour.

== See also ==
- Military history of Italy during World War II
- Royal Italian Army (1940–1946)
