= Attack on Nibeiwa =

WWII: British Army raid on Italian fort in Egypt

- Part of Operation Compass, during the Second World War
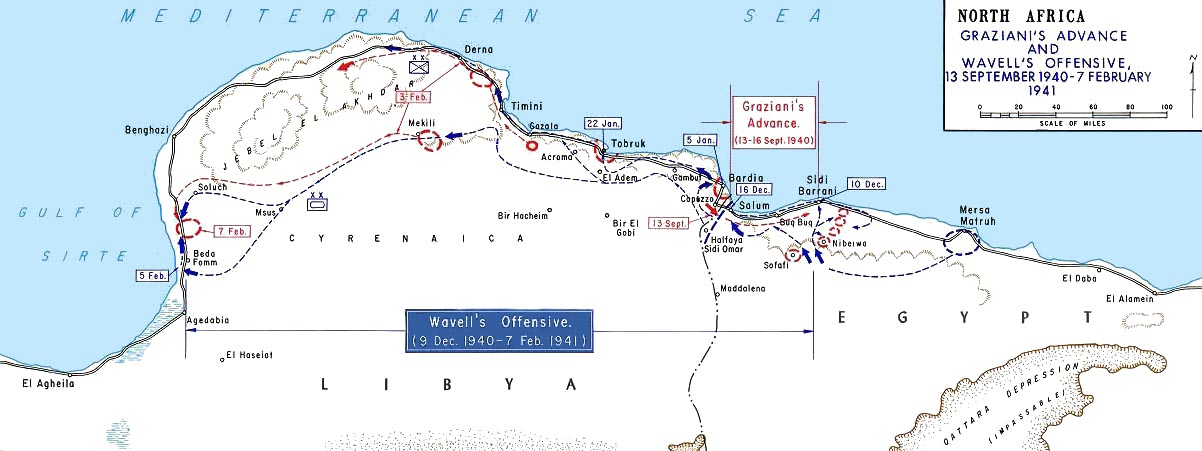
- Map of the Italian invasion of Egypt
Date	9 December 1940
Location	'Alam Nibeiwa (Nibeiwa Hill) 31°23′00″N 25°53′00″E
Result	British victory

Belligerents
United Kingdom: British India	Italy

Commanders and leaders
Richard O'Connor; Reginald Savory	Pietro Maletti †

Units involved
United Kingdom; British Indian Army; 11th Indian Infantry Brigade; British Army; 7th Royal Tank Regiment	Royal Italian Army; Maletti Group

Strength
5,000 soldiers 47 tanks	4,100 soldiers 23 tanks

Casualties and losses
56 killed 27 tanks disabled/broken down	819 killed 1,338 wounded 2,000 prisoners 28 tanks
- Nibeiwa, 12 mi (19 km) south of the port of Sidi Barrani

The Attack on Nibeiwa took place on 9 December 1940 near Nibeiwa, Egypt, when the Italian fortified camp held by the Maletti Group, the armoured force of the 10th Army, was overrun by British and Indian troops. The attack was the opening engagement of Operation Compass, a British raid which, if successful, would be followed up to try to expel the Italians from Egypt. Italy had declared war on France and Britain on 10 June and in the Italian invasion of Egypt (Operazione E) from 9 to 16 September 1940, the Italian 10th Army had reached the port of Sidi Barrani and dug in to await the completion of the Via della Vittoria, an extension of the Via Balbia, being built from the frontier. The Maletti Group garrisoned a camp at Nibeiwa,12 mi (19 km) south of the port of Sidi Barrani.

The British had fought a delaying action during the Italian advance with the 7th Support Group of the 7th Armoured Division and kept their main force at the railhead of Mersa Matruh about 80 mi (130 km) east of Sidi Barrani. The British probed the Italian defences continually and then planned a five-day raid on Italian fortified camps, which had been built in an arc from the coast at Maktila to Sofafi in the south-west on the inland escarpment. The British intended to advance into the Nibeiwa–Rabia gap and attack Nibeiwa from the west. If the attack succeeded, the British would move on to attack the camps at Tummar West and Tummar East. The tanks of the 7th Armoured Division would form a defensive screen to the west, to protect the flank of the 4th Indian Infantry Division as it attacked the camps and be ready to intercept an Italian counter-attack.

The British and Indian infantry rehearsed an attack with the infantry tanks of the 7th Royal Tank Regiment in late November and another rehearsal was announced for early December, which was actually the attack. On the night of 9/10 December the attack began with diversions on the east side as the main force closed up from the west. The real attack took the Italians by surprise, destroyed the 28 tanks before their crews could react and then broke into the camp. The Italian and Libyan garrison resisted the attack with great determination but were systematically overrun by a combination of tanks, artillery firing from point-blank range and infantry. The Italian and Libyan troops suffered 4,157 casualties for a British loss of 56 men killed and 27 tanks disabled or broken down. The success at Nibeiwa began the collapse of the Italian position in Egypt.

== Background ==
=== Italian invasion of Egypt ===
The Italian invasion of Egypt (Operazione E) by the Italian 10th Army began against the Western Desert Force on 13 September 1940, after several days of operations on the Italian side of the border to push back British troops. The original goal of the offensive had been an advance by the 10th Army from Italian Libya along the Egyptian coast to the Suez Canal. After numerous delays, the aim of the offensive was reduced to the capture of the port of Sidi Barrani, an advance of about 65 mi (105 km). Two divisions of the 10th Army advanced and met screening forces of the 7th Support Group (7th Armoured Division) which fell back slowly from Sollum. On 16 September, the 10th Army halted and took up defensive positions around Sidi Barrani, to build fortified camps while the Via Balbia was extended by the Via della Vittoria. Once the road was built and supplies had been accumulated, an advance on Mersa Matruh, about 80 mi (130 km) further east was to begin. Camps were built from Maktila with the 1st Libyan Division, 15 mi (24 km) east of Sidi Barrani, south through Tummars (east and west, 2nd Libyan Division), to Nibeiwa (Maletti Group) thence to four camps at Sofafi to the south-west, on the escarpment above the coastal strip. Blackshirt divisions held Sidi Barrani and Sollum; a metropolitan division garrisoned Buq Buq. Italian engineers worked on a new road from Fort Capuzzo through Sollum to Buq Buq, close to Sidi Barrani and a water pipe from Bardia. In December the 10th Army in Egypt had about 80,000 men, 250 guns and 120 tanks.

=== Western Desert Force ===
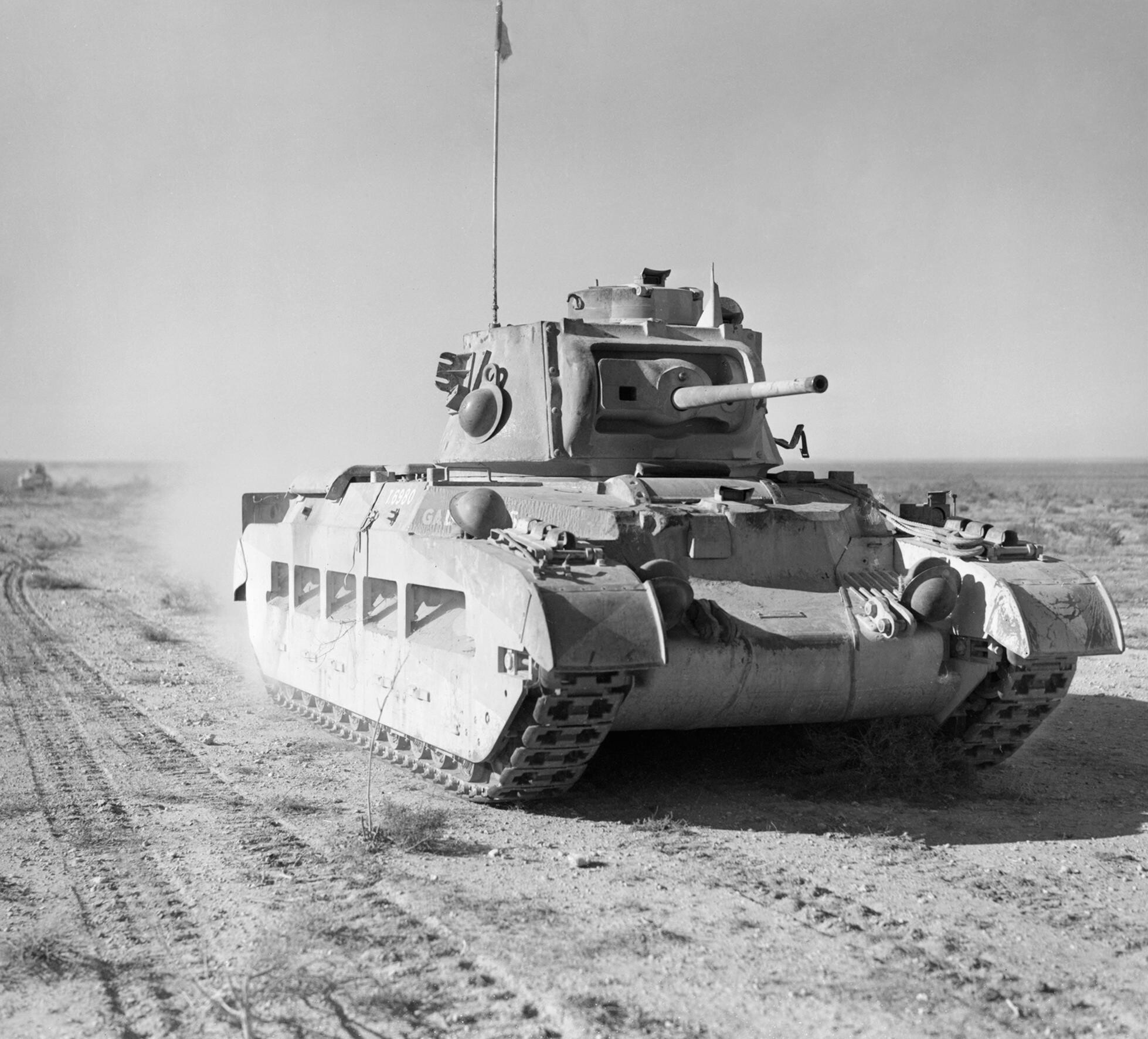
A Matilda tank in the Western Desert, December 1940

The British Middle East Command (General Archibald Wavell) had in Egypt and Palestine about 36,000 British, Commonwealth and Free French soldiers, 120 guns, 275 tanks and 142 aircraft, in two squadrons of Hurricanes, one of Gloster Gladiators, three of Bristol Blenheims, three of Vickers Wellingtons and one of Bristol Bombays, about 46 fighters and 116 bombers. The Western Desert Force (WDF, Lieutenant-General Richard O'Connor) comprised the 4th Indian Infantry Division (Major-General Noel Beresford-Peirse) and the 7th Armoured Division (Major-General Sir Michael O'Moore Creagh). The British had some fast Cruiser Mk I, Cruiser Mk II and Cruiser Mk III tanks with 2-pounder guns, which were superior to Italian M11/39 tanks. The British also had a battalion Matilda II infantry tanks that, while slow, carried the 2-pounder and armour that was impervious to Italian anti-tank guns and field guns.

=== Maletti Group ===
The I Medium Tank Battalion (Major Victor Ceva) and the II Medium Tank Battalion (Major Eugenio Campanile) and their M11/39 tanks of the 32nd Tank Infantry Regiment in Italy had landed in Libya on 8 July 1940 and transferred to the command of the 4th Tank Infantry Regiment. The two battalions had an establishment of 600 men, 72 tanks, 56 vehicles, 37 motorcycles and 76 trailers each. The medium tanks reinforced the 324 L3/35 tankettes already in Libya. The Maletti Group/Raggruppamento Maletti (General Pietro Maletti) was formed at Derna the same day, with seven Libyan motorised infantry battalions, a company of M11/39 tanks, a company of L3/33 tankettes, motorised artillery and supply units as the main motorised unit of the 10th Army and the first combined arms unit in North Africa.

== Prelude ==
=== Nibeiwa ===
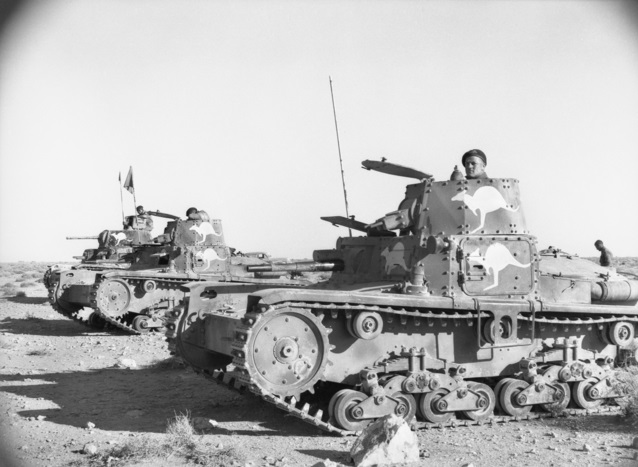
Italian M11/39 tanks (photographed after they had been captured and manned by Australians).

Nibeiwa was about 12 mi (20 km) south of Sidi Barrani; the camp was a double stone walled rectangle about 0.62 by 1.24 mi (1 by 2 km), with shelters every 50 yd (46 m) behind an anti-tank trench and a minefield, which had a gap to the north-west to allow easier access for supply trucks. The 10th Army began to prepare an advance to Mersa Matruh for 16 December. Only the IX Light Tank Battalion with L3/33 tankettes attached to the 2nd Libyan Division "Pescatori", the II Medium Tank Battalion with M11/39s, with the Maletti Group at Nibeiwa camp and the LXIII and XX Light Tank battalions, with the XXI Corps HQ, were still in Egypt. The five fortified camps from the coast to the escarpment were well defended, but too far apart for overlapping fields of fire, and the defenders were reliant on ground and air patrols to link the camps and watch the British. Italian air reconnaissance spotted British vehicle movements in the area, but Maletti was apparently not informed. On 8 December, Maletti alerted the nearby 2nd Libyan Division "Pescatori" that unusual low-level flying by the RAF was probably intended disguise the movement of armoured units. At 6:30 a.m. on 9 December, Maletti contacted the commanders of the 1st Libyan Division and 2nd Libyan Division, reporting British preparatory movements.

=== British plan ===
Training Exercise No.1 was held from 25 to 26 November near Matruh, on a model marked to resemble the Italian camps at Nibeiwa and the Tummars, and the troops were told that another rehearsal would be run in early December. The exercise was useful in providing experience in night moves under moonlight and attack tactics against a defensive position in the desert. A Method of Attack on an entrenched Camp in the Desert was distributed to units ready for Training Exercise No.2.

The 7th Armoured Division and the 4th Indian Division were reinforced with the British 16th Infantry Brigade, the 7th RTR and the Matruh Garrison Force of a Coldstream Guards battalion and a battery of field artillery; the 7th Indian Brigade was to act as a reserve and protect the lines of communication. Guarded by the Support Group, the rest of 7th Armoured Division and the 4th Indian Division were to drive between Nibeiwa and the Sofafi camps and then attack Nibeiwa from the west with the 11th Indian Infantry Brigade (Colonel Reginald Savory) and 47 Matilda II tanks of the 7th RTR. The cruiser tanks of the 7th Armoured Division were to prevent a counter-attack from Sofafi and cover the left flank of the 4th Indian Division. Once Nibewa had been captured, the attackers would move on to the Tummars. Each division was to have a field supply depot about 40 mi (64 km) west of Matruh, which were elaborately camouflaged and filled sufficiently for five days' operations and two days' supply of water. If the attack succeeded, the 7th Armoured Division tanks were to drive north to cut off the Italian line of retreat from Sidi Barrani while the Indians captured the other camps near the port. Maktila was to be cut off by the Matruh Garrison Force, and the tanks were to drive for Buq Buq to cut off the retreat of the garrison to Sollum.

On the night of 6/7 December, the 4th Indian Division left camp for Training Exercise No.2 in a cold wind that raised dust and concealed the lorries of the 4th and 6th New Zealand Reserve Mechanical Transport companies as they drove spread out over the desert, in air formation (no lorry to be within 250 yd (230 m) of another). After driving for 50 mi (80 km) the force rendezvoused at Bir Kenayis, about 30 mi (48 km) south of Matruh and dug slit trenches. The troops rested on 7 December, unseen by Italian air reconnaissance, and were told that the attack was the real one that evening. On 8 December, the advance continued into a bright, cold windless day at about 8 mph (13 km/h) at the front and in 40 mph (64 km/h) bursts at the back, with everyone expecting to be attacked by Italian aircraft that did not appear. By late afternoon, the Indians were 15 mi (24 km) south-east of Nibeiwa, 100 mi (160 km) west of their jumping-off point. At dusk two battalions of the 11th Indian Brigade and the 7th RTR moved off and drove in moonlight to a position 6 mi (9.7 km) south-west of Nibeiwa; before sunrise the units assembled at a jumping-off point 4,000 yd (2.3 mi; 3.7 km) north-west of the camp. The third battalion drove about 3 mi (4.8 km) short of the east side of the camp, which was on a flat plateau with a shallow valley on that side.

== Battle ==
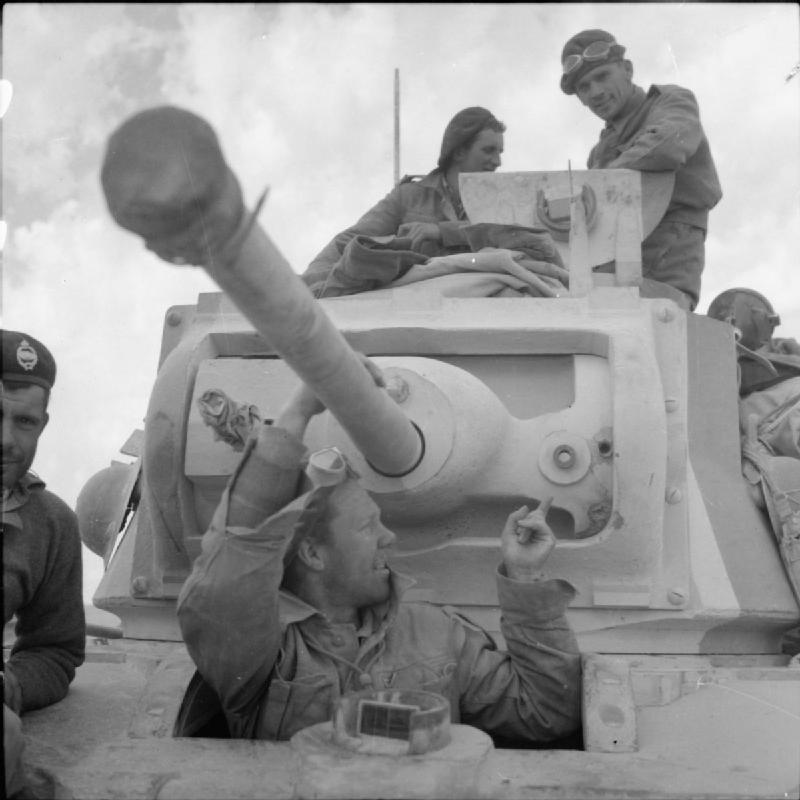
Matilda II Infantry tank and crew, North Africa, 1940 E1498

British aircraft bombed the camps and flew overhead all night, to disguise the sound of the ground force vehicles and to keep Italian aircraft grounded. At 3:00 a.m., after the Indians had advanced on foot to the perimeter, they came upon listening posts and commenced firing, at which the Italian garrison sent up flares and returned fire. When the garrison ceased firing, the Indians shifted position and fired again, Under cover of the noise on the east side of Nibeiwa, the British tanks and lorries drove round the west side of the camp, and at 6:00 a.m. the Indians on the east side retired. A bombardment by British artillery began from the east, to mislead the Italians. At 7:15 a.m. the artillery of the 4th Indian Division fired on Nibewa from the south-east, around 7:00 a.m. and at 7:30 a.m. the tanks began the attack with the 31st Field Battery RA and flanked by the Bren Carrier platoons of the Indian infantry. The Italians had concentrated their 28 M11/39 tanks beyond the perimeter wall, where the tank crews were caught while warming engines.

The Italian tank crews had no time to react before their tanks were knocked out. The British tanks broke down the walls and drove into the camp, where the Italians had just breakfasted; Maletti advanced with a machine-gun and was killed by a gunshot wound. At 7:45 a.m. the British and Indian infantry followed up on board lorries, which stopped 700 yd (640 m) away for the men to disembark and charge into the camp. The Italian and Libyan artillerymen stood by their guns but found that even field artillery shells fired at 30 yd (27 m) range were ineffective against the armour of the Matilda tanks. The Italian and Libyan infantry fought on and isolated parties stalked British tanks with hand grenades but the British methodically occupied the camp, tanks artillery and infantry co-operating to reduce isolated pockets of resistance. By 10:40 a.m. the last Italian resistance was overcome and large amounts of supplies and water were discovered intact.

== Aftermath ==
=== Analysis ===
Australian war correspondent Alan Moorehead visited Nibeiwa after the battle. To reach it, he had to move around destroyed lorries and Bren Carriers that had run onto mines, and past square holes in the ground which had been dug for machine-gun posts. Dead lay around the fort; derelict light tanks were at the west wall, where the Maletti Group had made its last stand. Other tanks were inside the camp facing in all directions. The capture of Nibeiwa camp cleared the way for the next stage of the British attack, when the remaining operational tanks and the 5th Indian Infantry Brigade moved west of the Tummar camps and the 16th Infantry Brigade closed up to the area vacated by the Indian brigade. The Western Desert Force completed the capture of the camps and captured Sidi Barrani, destroying two Italian divisions by 10 December, as two more divisions were caught on the Mersa Matruh–Sidi Barrani road and forced to surrender. By the time that Sidi Barrani was captured on 11 December, the WDF bag had increased to 38,300 prisoners, 73 tanks and 422 guns for a loss of 133 men killed, 387 wounded and eight missing. On 28 December, planning with photographs from reconnaissance aircraft and night patrol reports began for the capture of Bardia, which would not have the benefit of surprise as the attack on Nibeiwa did, as it had far less extensive defences and was too far from neighbouring camps to be supported. The defences of Bardia were reminiscent of the defensive structures used in the First World War, and British artillery would be much more important than it had been at Nibeiwa. The experience of the attack there was important for the plan to use a combination of shock, firepower, tanks and the mobility of the Infantry tanks to break into the port defences.

=== Casualties ===
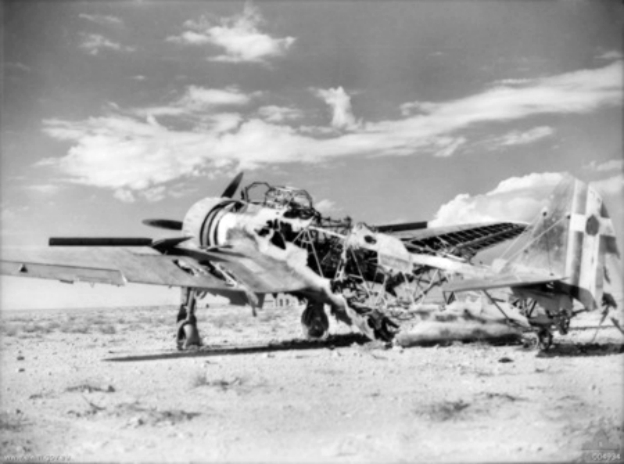
Wrecked Breda Ba.65, 1940

In 1954, the British official historian I. S. O. Playfair wrote that the attackers took 2,000 Italian and Libyan prisoners and a large quantity of supplies and water for a British loss of 56 men. In 1979 the Italian official history gave a total of 819 Italian and Libyan soldiers killed, along with Maletti and 1,338 men wounded.

=== Subsequent operations ===
The attack on Tummar West began at 1:50 p.m., after the 7th RTR had refuelled and artillery had bombarded the defences for an hour. Another approach from the north-west was made, the tanks broke through the perimeter and were followed twenty minutes later by the infantry. The defenders held out for longer than the Nibeiwa garrison but by 4:00 p.m. Tummar West was overrun except for the north-eastern corner. The tanks moved on to Tummar East, the greater part of which was captured by nightfall. The 4th Armoured Brigade had advanced to Azziziya, where the garrison of 400 men surrendered, light patrols of the 7th Hussars pushed forward to cut the road from Sidi Barrani to Buq Buq, while armoured cars of the 11th Hussars ranged further west. The 7th Armoured Brigade were held in reserve ready to intercept an Italian counter-attack. The 2nd Libyan Division lost 26 officers and 1,327 men killed, 32 officers and 804 men wounded, with the survivors being taken prisoner.

== See also ==
- List of British military equipment of World War II
- List of Italian military equipment in World War II

== Bibliography ==
Books

- Henderson, J. H. (2003) [1954]. RMT. Official history of the 4th and 6th Reserve Mechanical Transport Companies, 2 NZEF. Official History of New Zealand in the Second World War, 1939–45 (online, New Zealand Electronic Text Centre ed.). Wellington, NZ: War History Branch, Dept. of Internal Affairs. OCLC 173284169.
- La prima offensiva britannica in Africa settentrionale (ottobre 1940 – febbraio 1941) I. annexe 32 [The First British Offensive in North Africa (October 1940 – February 1941)] (in Italian). Roma: Esercito. Corpo di stato maggiore. Ufficio storico. 1979. OCLC 6863876.
- Mackenzie, Compton (1951). Eastern Epic: September 1939 – March 1943 Defence. Vol. I. London: Chatto & Windus. OCLC 59637091.
- Montanari, Mario (1985). Sidi el Barrani (giugno 1940 – febbraio 1941) [Sidi Barrani (June 1940 – February 1941)]. Le Operazioni in Africa Settentrionale (in Italian). Vol. I. Roma: Ufficio Storico dello Stato Maggiore Esercito. OCLC 868634287.
- Moorehead, A. (2009) [1944]. The Desert War: The Classic Trilogy on the North African campaign 1940–43 (Aurum Press ed.). London: Hamish Hamilton. ISBN 978-1-84513-391-7.
- Parri, M. "Storia del 32° Rgt. Carri dalla Costituzione del Reggimento fino al termine del Secondo Conflitto Mondiale" [History of the 32nd Armoured Regiment from its Establishment until the end of the Second World War]. www.associocarri.it (in Italian). no date.
- Pitt, B. (2001) [1980]. The Crucible of War: Wavell's Command. Vol. I (Cassell ed.). London: Jonathan Cape. ISBN 978-0-304-35950-9 – via Archive Foundation.
- Playfair, I. S. O.; Stitt, G. M. S.; Molony, C. J. C. & Toomer, S. E. (2004) [1954]. Butler, J. R. M. (ed.). The Mediterranean and Middle East: The Early Successes Against Italy (to May 1941). History of the Second World War, United Kingdom Military Series. Vol. I (facs. repr. Naval & Military Press, Ukfield ed.). London: HMSO. ISBN 978-1-84574-065-8.
- Raugh, H. E. (1993). Wavell in the Middle East, 1939–1941: A Study in Generalship. London: Brassey's UK. ISBN 978-0-08-040983-2.
- Walker, Ian W. (2003). Iron Hulls, Iron Hearts; Mussolini's Elite Armoured Divisions in North Africa. Ramsbury: The Crowood Press. ISBN 978-1-86126-646-0.

Theses

- Christie, H. R. (1999). Fallen Eagles: The Italian 10th Army in the Opening Campaign in the Western Desert, June 1940 – December 1940 (MA). Fort Leavenworth, KS: U. S. Army Command and General Staff College. OCLC 465212715. A116763. Archived from the original on 16 February 2015 – via Archive Foundation.
