= Giuseppe De Stefanis =

Italian General during World War II

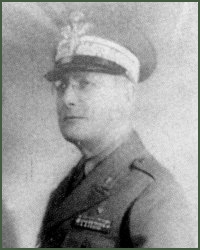

Chief of Staff of the Royal Italian Army
- In office 19 May 1943 – 31 May 1943
- Preceded by: Ezio Rosi
- Succeeded by: Mario Roatta

Personal details
- Born: 20 December 1885 La Spezia, Kingdom of Italy
- Died: 11 December 1965 (aged 79) Rome, Italy
- Awards: Bronze Medal of Military Valour; Military Order of Savoy; Order of Saints Maurice and Lazarus; Order of Merit of the Italian Republic

Military service
- Allegiance: Kingdom of Italy
- Branch/service: Royal Italian Army
- Rank: Lieutenant General
- Commands: 8th Field Artillery Regiment; 24th Infantry Division Pinerolo; 102nd Motorised Division Trento; 132nd Armoured Division Ariete; XX Motorized Corps; Army Chief of Staff; LI Corps
- Battles/wars: World War I; Battles of the Isonzo; World War II; Greco-Italian War; Siege of Tobruk; Operation Crusader; Battle of Gazala; Battle of Bir Hakeim; Axis capture of Tobruk; Battle of Mersa Matruh; First Battle of El Alamein; Battle of Alam Halfa; Second Battle of El Alamein; Battle of El Agheila

Giuseppe De Stefanis (La Spezia, 20 December 1885 – Rome, 11 December 1965) was an Italian general during World War II.

== Biography ==
De Stefanis was born in La Spezia on December 20, 1885. After enlisting in the Royal Italian Army, in November 1903 he enrolled in the Royal Military Academy of Artillery and Engineers in Turin, graduating with the rank of artillery second lieutenant on September 28, 1905. After promotion to lieutenant on August 28, 1908, he became captain on February 1, 1915. In 1915 he married Miss Emanuela dei Visconti di Ozzano.

He participated in the First World War, receiving a Bronze Medal of Military Valour for an action on the Isonzo Front in September 1916 and being promoted to major on June 16, 1917. On 29 October 1922 he became alternate judge at the territorial military court of Rome, and on 20 April 1924 he was transferred to the General Staff. On March 31, 1926 he took up service as section head in the General Staff of the Royal Army, being promoted to lieutenant colonel on June 30 of the same year.

After promotion to colonel on 29 October 1929, on 1 December 1932 he assumed command of the 8th Field Artillery Regiment based in Verona, maintaining it until 1935. On 1 September 1937 he was promoted to brigadier general, and a week later he was appointed commander of the artillery of the VII Army Corps in Florence and head of the training office at the command of the Staff Officer Corps in Rome. On 25 November 1938 he was given command of the artillery of the Armored Army Corps.

After Italy entered World War II on June 10, 1940, he was promoted to major general on January 1, 1941, and given command of the 24th Infantry Division Pinerolo. In that same month the "Pinerolo" was transferred to the Albanian front and, after the surrender of Greece in April, remained as an occupation unit in Thessaly. In August of the same year he was replaced at the command of the "Pinerolo" Division by Major General Licurgo Zannini, and on 14 August 1941 he was transferred to Libya at the High Command of the Armed Forces in North Africa, and on the 25th of the same month he assumed command of the 102nd Motorised Division Trento. With this division he participated in the siege of Tobruk and Operation Crusader, until January 20, 1942, when he was given command of the 132nd Armoured Division Ariete which he led during the battles of Gazala, Tobruk, Bir Hakeim and Mersa Matruh. For his successes he was awarded, on May 26, 1942, the Officer's Cross of the Military Order of Savoy.

On June 26, 1942, De Stefanis replaced General Ettore Baldassarre, killed by an air strike near Mersa Matruh, as the commander of the XX Motorized Corps, of which "Ariete" was part. He left the command of the division Brigadier General Francesco Antonio Arena. De Stefanis led the XX Corps during the first battle of El Alamein, the battle of Alam Halfa and the second battle of El Alamein; on 14 November 1942 he was promoted to lieutenant general. Following the defeat at El Alamein, the XX Corps retreated from Egypt and clashed with the Allies at El Agheila before abandoning Libya and settling on the Mareth line in Tunisia. With the corps reduced to brigade size by the losses suffered at El Alamein, having lost all manoeuvring units, De Stefanis was replaced by General Taddeo Orlando on February 4, 1943 and repatriated.

From 3 May of the same year he assumed the post of Operations Deputy Chief of Staff of the Army, replacing General Carlo Vecchiarelli who had been transferred to Athens in command of the 11th Army. From 19 to 31 May he temporarily served as Army Chief of Staff, after the departure of Ezio Rosi and before the appointment of Mario Roatta.

In the afternoon of 8 September 1943, after the Allies had broadcast the news of the Armistice of Cassibile, De Stefanis, standing in for the absent Roatta, participated in the Council of the Crown held in Rome which decided to confirm and comply with the armistice. On the following night, as German forces implemented Operation Achse, he was among the high-ranking officers who fled Rome for Ortona following Marshal Pietro Badoglio and the royal family, reaching Brindisi with the corvette Baionetta. There, a few weeks later, he assumed command of the newly established LI Corps, a nominal command without any real subordinate troops. In June 1944 De Stefanis became head of Delegation A of the General Staff, supervising the organization of Italian troops that would fight alongside the Allies as the Combat groups. On 5 October 1944 he was made available to the Ministry of War for special assignments.

In 1956 De Stefanis was awarded the title of Grand Officer of the Order of Merit of the Italian Republic. He died in Rome on 11 December 1965.
