= Battle of Mersa Matruh =

Battle of the Western Desert Campaign in World War II

- Part of the Western Desert campaign of the Second World War
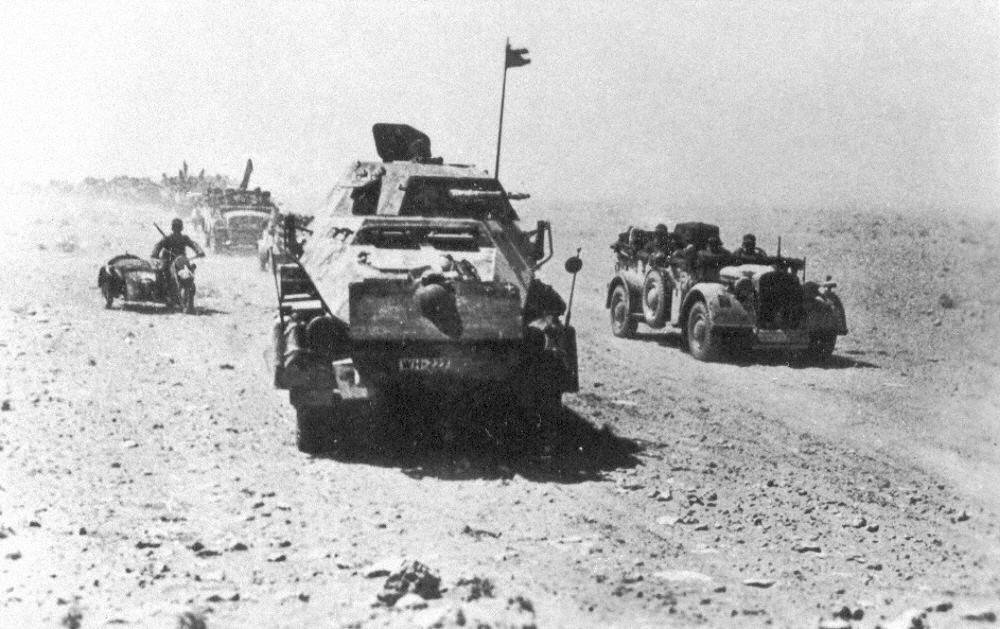
- Kampfgruppe Graf of the 21st Panzer Division.
Date	26–29 June 1942 (3 days)
Location	Mersa Matruh, 120 mi (193 km) east of Egyptian frontier 31°21′00″N 27°14′00″E
Result	German–Italian victory

Belligerents
Italy; Germany	United Kingdom; India; New Zealand

Commanders and leaders
(Kingdom of Italy) Giuseppe De Stefanis; (Kingdom of Italy) Enea Navarini; (Kingdom of Italy) Benvenuto Gioda; (Nazi Germany) Erwin Rommel; (Nazi Germany) Walter Nehring	(United Kingdom) Claude Auchinleck; (United Kingdom) William Gott; (United Kingdom) Brian Horrocks

Strength
German: 60 tanks; Italian: 40 tanks	200 tanks

Casualties and losses
	8,000 killed, wounded or captured; c. 6,000 pow; 40 tanks captured
- Mersa Matruh, Egypt

The Battle of Mersa Matruh was fought from 26 to 29 June 1942, following the defeat of the Eighth Army (General Sir Claude Auchinleck) at the Battle of Gazala and was part of the Western Desert Campaign of the Second World War. The battle was fought with the German–Italian Panzer Army Afrika (Panzerarmee Afrika (Generalfeldmarschall Erwin Rommel). The Eighth Army comprised X Corps and XIII Corps.

The battle was fought during the pursuit by the Panzerarmee of the Eighth Army as it retreated into Egypt. Rommel intended to defeat in detail (one after the other) the British infantry formations, before they had a chance to regroup. The fortress port of Mersa Matruh and 6,000 prisoners were captured, along with a great deal of supplies and equipment. The Axis cut off the line of retreat of X Corps and XIII Corps but was too weak to stop the British from breaking out.

== Background ==
After the defeat of the Eighth Army at the Battle of Gazala, it was compelled to retreat eastwards. The British left a garrison in Tobruk that was expected to be strong enough to hold the port while the Eighth Army regrouped and replaced its losses. The British command had not prepared Tobruk for a lengthy siege and planned to return to relieve the Tobruk garrison within two months. The Axis capture of Tobruk in a day was a great psychological blow to the British and meant that Panzer Army Africa (Panzerarmee Afrika/Armata Corazzata Africa) had a port, ample supplies and did not need to leave a garrison to watch the port.

The Italians and Germans could invade Egypt for the second time. After the victory at Tobruk, Rommel pressed on the heels of the Eighth Army. Rommel intended to bring the Eighth Army to battle and defeat it before the British had the chance to bring up fresh units and reform behind a defensive line. Though his forces were badly weakened by the Battle of Gazala, he had speed, guile and surprise. The 21st Panzer Division was given one day to regroup and then was sent down the coast road to Egypt.

Claude Auchinleck, the Commander-in-Chief Middle East Command, offered his resignation on 22 June, which was declined. To slow the Axis advance into Egypt, the British command intended to form a defensive position at the Cyrenaica–Egypt frontier, along the Frontier Wire ("the wire"). XIII Corps (Lieutenant-General William Gott), was to fight a delaying action; Axis forces reached the wire on 23 June, shortly after XIII Corps. There was no time to mount a defence and the Eighth Army lacked the armour to defend the open southern end of the position. Gott recommended falling back another 120 mi (190 km) to the Mersa Matruh position. British rearguards tried to destroy the fuel and ammunition dumped at the frontier and then Gott withdrew without engaging the Panzerarmee Afrika. The British command ordered the Eighth Army to stop the Panzerarmee Afrika at Mersa Matruh.

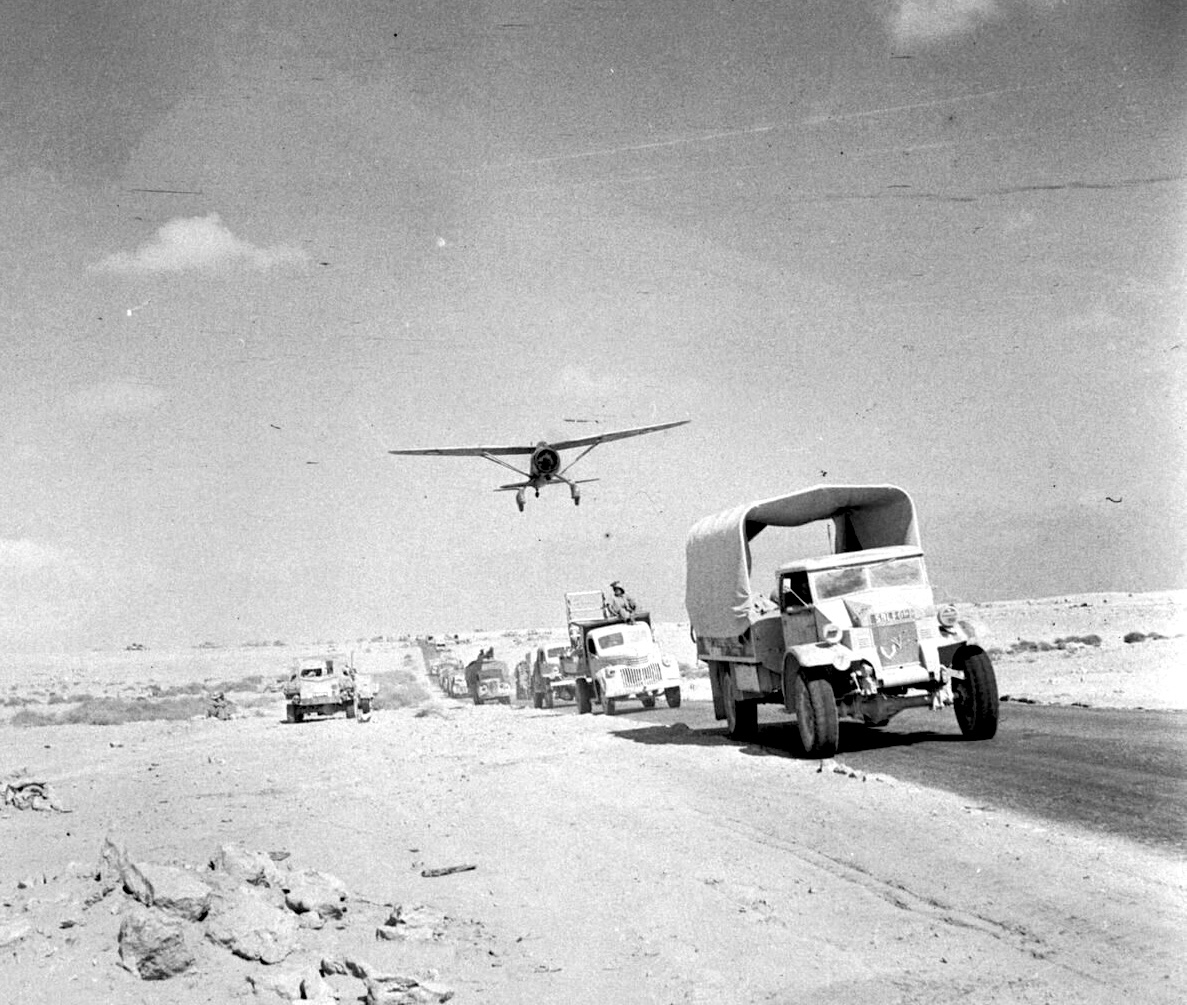
British Army retreating from the Gazala position

Rommel requested freedom of manoeuvre from Mussolini to pursue the Eighth Army into Egypt, which was granted. Fuel, equipment and munitions were salvaged from remaining British stores at the frontier. Rommel pushed on unopposed through the night and the next day, meeting no resistance from the Eighth Army but increasing attack from the air. The Desert Air Force was growing in strength and operating nearer to its bases, while the Luftwaffe and Regia Aeronautica were receding from theirs. (Note: Rommel commented in his papers, "My formations were repeatedly assailed by heavy R.A.F. bomber attacks. Our own Luftwaffe was regrouping at the time and could not put up any fighters".)

After the reverses at Gazala and Tobruk, the Eighth Army was disorganised and shaken in its morale. Auchinleck realised a change in command was necessary and on 25 June he relieved Ritchie and took over the Eighth Army. He issued directives to change the Eighth Army into a force that stressed mobility and made it clear that his priority was to keep it intact. The last defensive position before Alexandria was El Alamein. Auchinleck was preparing defences there but a mobile defensive battle was to be fought from Mersa Matruh to the El Alamein gap. It had become apparent to Auchinleck that non-mobile formations were helpless against mobile forces and he could ill-afford to lose more formations. He shifted transport to enable the infantry formations in XIII Corps to be fully motorised and stressed that the Eighth Army forces fighting at Mersa Matruh must not allow themselves to be cut off.

== Prelude ==
=== Mersa Matruh ===
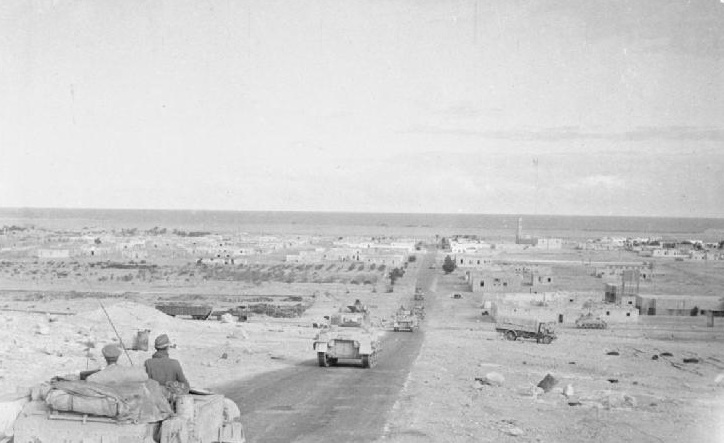
Mersa Matruh, 1942

In 1942, Mersa Matruh (Mersa, anchorage) was a small port 120 mi (190 km) east of the frontier wire, halfway between Cyrenica and El Alamein. A railhead connected the town to Alexandria. The harbour was 1.5 mi (2.4 km) long and enclosed a small, deep-water anchorage. The coastal town was like a small Tobruk. Mersa Matruh had been fortified in 1940 before the Italian invasion of Egypt in 1940, was further strengthened during the build-up for Operation Crusader and was the last coastal fortress in Allied possession.

The town is on a thin coastal plain that extends inland 10 mi (16 km) to an escarpment. Extending further south is a second narrow plain extending 12 mi (19 km) to the Sidi Hamaza escarpment. At the eastern end of this escarpment is the Minqar Qaim track. Beyond the upper escarpment lies the high desert, extending 80 mi (130 km) south to the Qattara Depression. The western approach to the town was mined and the minefields had been extended around the southern approach to the town but the eastern approach to the fortress was still open and an airfield was just inland. The coast road (Via Balbia) was the main avenue of retreat and ran through the town.

=== Axis plans ===
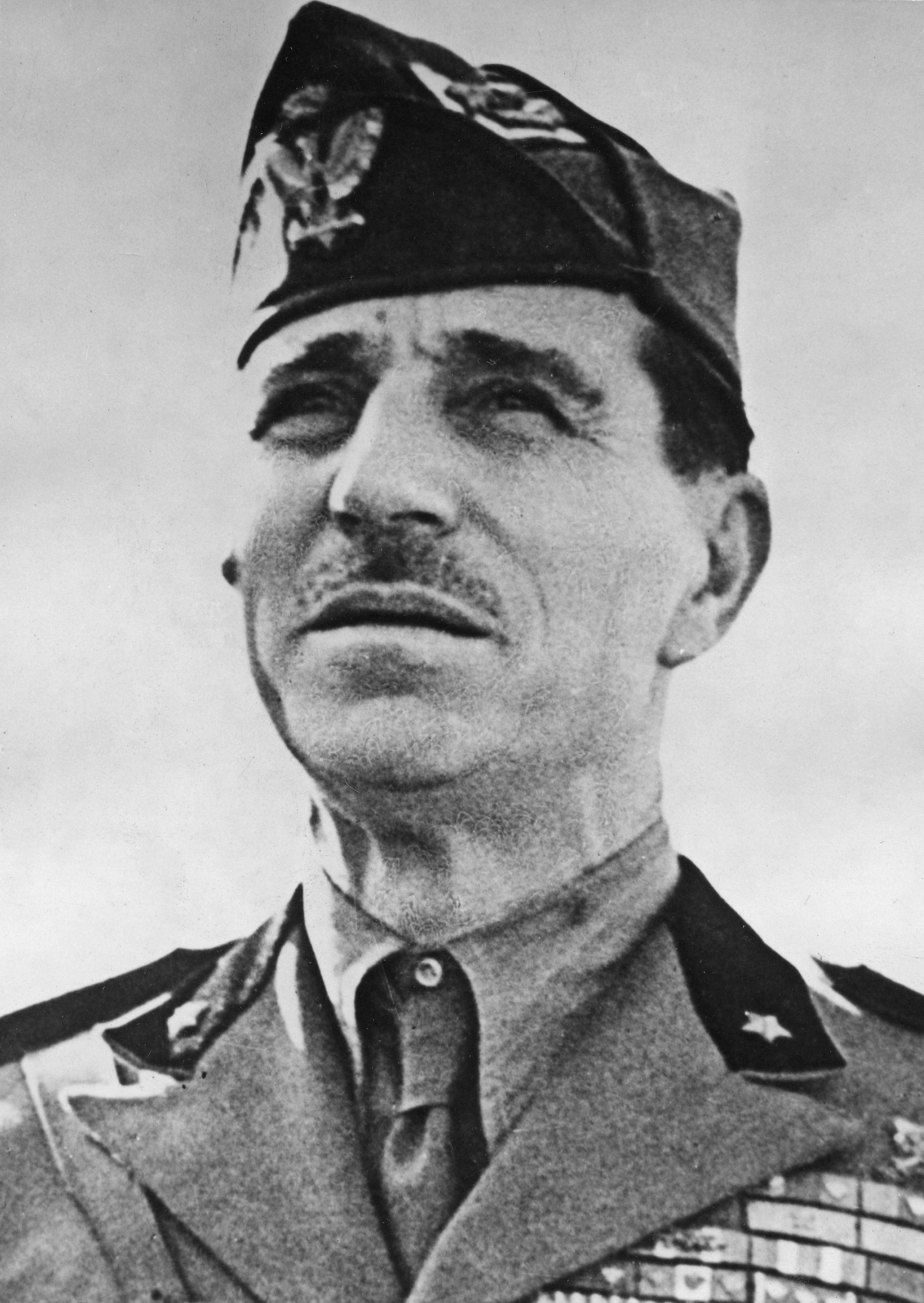
General Ettore Bastico

When Rommel arrived, he planned to defeat the Eighth Army in detail before the British had a chance to regroup behind a defensive line and rebuild their army with fresh formations. Having dealt the British armoured forces a severe blow at Gazala, he looked to destroy much of their infantry by trapping them in Mersa Matruh. Rommel believed that four infantry divisions were in the fortress and the remnants of the British armour was to the south. He planned to use German units to push the British armour aside as the 90th Light Division trapped the infantry at Matruh. The Desert Air Force had attacked a car of the XX Motorised Corps, killing General Guido Piacenza and mortally wounding Colonel Vittorio Raffaelli, the commander of engineers and the corps commander, General Ettore Baldassarre, on 25 June while they were with the lead columns of the attack on the 7th Armoured Division.

German reconnaissance units reached the outskirts of Mersa Matruh on the evening of 25 June. Rommel planned to attack the next day but on the morning of 26 June an Axis supply column was destroyed, causing a fuel shortage and delaying the attack until the afternoon. Rommel's information on British dispositions at Matruh was incomplete, partly due to a lack of air reconnaissance and partly to the loss of his wireless interception unit, the 621st Signals Battalion, which the British had become aware of and made a point of over-running and destroying at the Battle of Gazala.

=== British plans ===
Auchinleck had been preparing defences at Mersa Matruh to be garrisoned by XXX Corps but then moved it back to the Alamein position; the positions at Matruh were taken up by X Corps (Lieutenant-General William Holmes), with two infantry divisions. The 10th Indian Infantry Division was sent to Mersa Matruh proper, while the 50th (Northumbrian) Infantry Division was east of the town protecting the rear. To the south, XIII Corps took up positions on the high ground above the second escarpment. Auchinleck directed the corps commanders to offer the strongest possible resistance; if either corps was attacked the other was to take the opportunity to attack the Axis flank.

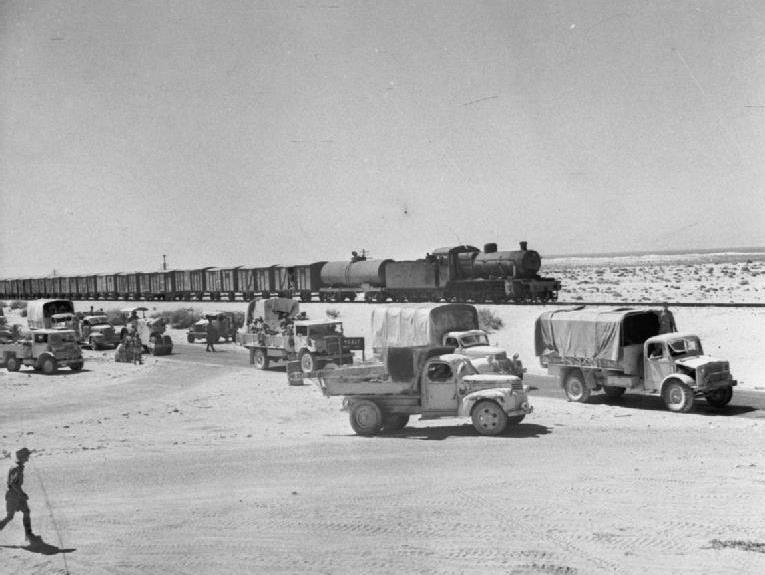
Eighth Army equipment and supplies being removed from Mersa Matruh, 26 June 1942.

XIII Corps comprised the 5th Indian Infantry Division, 2nd New Zealand Division and 1st Armoured Division but the 5th Indian Infantry Division had only the 29th Indian Infantry Brigade. It was south of the town on the Sidi Hamaza escarpment. The 2nd New Zealand Division had recently arrived from Syria and took post at the eastern end of the escarpment, at the Minqar Qaim (Minqar, promontory or cliff) track. The 22nd Armoured Brigade (1st Armoured Division) was in the desert 5 mi (8.0 km) to the south-west. The division had been reinforced by the 7th Motorised Brigade and 4th Armoured Brigade (7th Armoured Division) that protected the Eighth Army against a southern flanking manoeuvre. The armoured units had lost nearly all of their tanks at Gazala but had received replacements, bringing the number up to 159 tanks, including 60 American Grant tanks with 75 mm guns.

Between the corps was a plain bounded by the escarpments, where a thin minefield had been laid, screened by Gleecol and Leathercol from the 29th Indian Infantry Brigade. The columns each had two platoons of infantry and an artillery detachment. Orders and counter-orders resulted in confusion in the minds of the British commanders. The British forces had to engage the Axis and inflict as much attrition as possible but could not risk being enveloped and destroyed. At Matruh the Eighth Army units were far stronger than the German and Italians but their effectiveness was reduced by conflicting objectives. There was little co-ordination between the British forces and communication was poor from the corps level on down.

== Battle ==
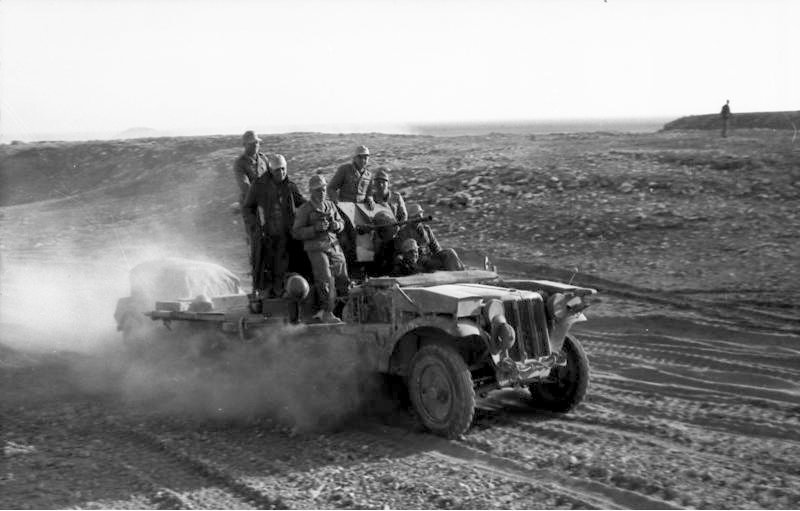
A Sd.Kfz 10 mounted with a 20 mm Flak 30 gun

Delays in getting units in position and refuelled meant the Axis attack of 26 June did not begin until mid-afternoon. The 21st Panzer Division moved across the short plain between the two escarpments above Matruh, with the 90th Light Division on its left flank, while the 15th Panzer Division moved across the plain above the second escarpment with the XX Motorized Corps following. The 90th Light and 21st Panzer divisions made a path through the minefield and brushed aside Gleecol and Leathercol. On the high desert plain the 15th Panzer Division ran into the 22nd Armoured Brigade and its drive forward was checked.

At dawn on 27 June, the 90th Light Division resumed its advance and destroyed the 9th Battalion, Durham Light Infantry (9th DLI), 17 mi (27 km) south of Matruh. As it moved east, the 90th Light Division came under the fire of the 50th (Northumbrian) Infantry Division artillery and was forced to take cover. To the south Rommel advanced with the 21st Panzer Division and under the cover of an artillery duel the 21st Panzer Division made a flanking movement across the front of the 2nd New Zealand Division to the eastern approach at Minqar Qaim. The division ran into the 2nd New Zealand divisional transport at Minquar Qaim, scattering it. Though the New Zealanders were easily holding against the 21st Panzer Division, their path of retreat had been cut off. At midday on 27 June, Auchinleck sent a message to his two corps commanders indicating that they were to retire rather than risk encirclement and destruction. Rommel moved north and joined the 90th Light Division and got them to resume their advance to cut the coast road. After dark, the 90th Light Division reached the coast road, blocking the retreat of X Corps.

With the line of retreat of the 2nd New Zealand Division cut, Gott decided to withdraw that night and notified the Eighth Army. It was the Panzerarmee that was in a perilous position. The 90th Light Division occupied a narrow salient, isolated on the coast road. The 21st Panzer Division was 15 mi (24 km) away, hard pressed by the New Zealanders and the 15th Panzer Division and XX Motorised Corps were blocked by the 1st Armoured Division. Gott did not see the opportunity as he was preoccupied with getting his forces out intact. Gott relayed his intention to the Eighth Army, planning to take up a second delaying position at Fuka, about 30 mi (48 km) east of Matruh.

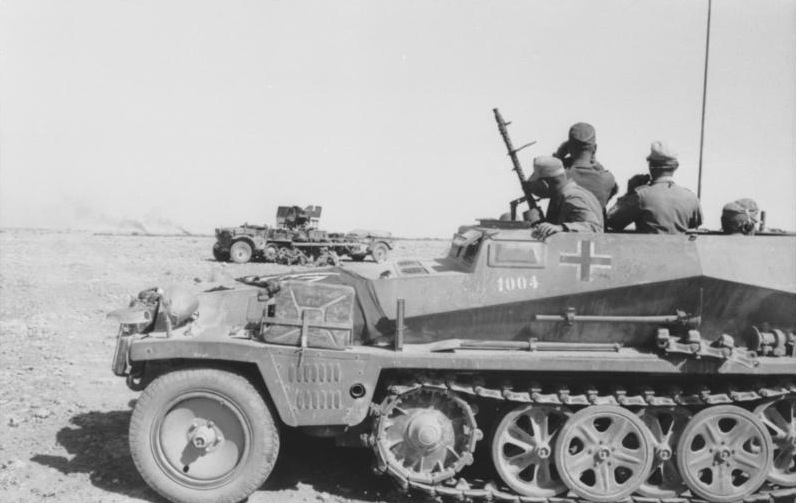
A Sd.Kfz. 250 in the open desert

At 21:20 hours on 27 June, Auchinleck ordered the Eighth Army to fall back to Fuka. By this point, the 2nd New Zealand Division commander, General Bernard Freyberg, had been wounded in the neck from shrapnel. He passed command to Brigadier Lindsay Inglis the commander of the 4th NZ Brigade. Inglis chose to use his brigade to fight its way through to the east, to be followed by the divisional headquarters and the 5th NZ Brigade. There was to be no preliminary bombardment to surprise the Germans. The start of the attack was delayed until 02:00 by the late arrival of the Maori battalion. Once formed up the three battalions set off down the escarpment. With fixed bayonets, the 4th NZ Brigade drove down the Minqar Qaim track directly upon the positions of a Panzergrenadier battalion of the 21st Panzer Division. The German defenders were unaware of the New Zealand advance until they were nearly upon them and the New Zealanders drove their way through their positions.

The fighting was fierce, confused, at times hand to hand and some German wounded were bayoneted by the New Zealanders as they worked their way through, for which the Germans issued a formal complaint. Reaching the other side of the position, the 4th NZ Brigade regrouped and made good its escape to the east. While this attack was underway Inglis grew concerned over the delay and the approaching dawn, deciding to take the rest of the division by a different route. Overloading what transport was available he led the divisional headquarters, the Reserve Group and the 5th NZ Brigade away to the south and ran into the positions of a panzer battalion of the 21st Panzer Division. In the confused firing that followed a number of trucks and ambulance vehicles were set on fire but the bulk of the force managed to scramble away. Orders had been issued for a withdrawal of XIII Corps to Fuka but it is unclear if the 2nd New Zealand Division received them. The elements of the division continued east to El Alamein. Over the three days of fighting the New Zealanders had suffered some 800 casualties, including their commanding officer but almost 10,000 men got away.

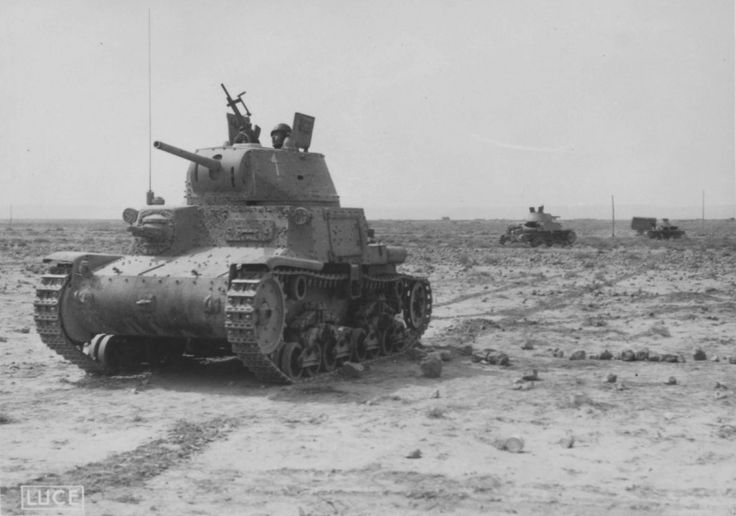
Italian M14/41 tank

Due to a communication error, Auchinleck's order to withdraw did not reach Holmes until early in the morning of 28 June. Through the night, X Corps counter-attacked to the south to take the pressure off Gott, not realising that XIII Corps had already gone. A short discussion was held between Holmes and Auchinleck, in which Holmes decided that he could remain and hold on to the fortress as long as possible, attack eastwards on the coast road and fight through the 90th Light Division or break out in the night to the south. Auchinleck made it clear that X Corps was not to attempt to hold out in its defensive positions and he thought there was no point to try to fight east along the coast road. He ordered Holmes to divide his force into columns and break out to the south. They were to continue on for a few miles before turning east to make their way to El Alamein.

That night, X Corps assembled in small columns and broke out to the south. The Afrika Korps had moved on, leaving only the Italians and the 90th Light Division to invest Matruh. Fierce engagements, primarily with Italian forces, occurred as they drove through. One of the columns picked a path that approached the Afrika Korps command section. Rommel's Kampfstaffel was engaged and the staff officers had to defend themselves. (Note: Kampfstaffel Kiehl was a light Kampfgruppe (battle group) under the command of Colonel Kiehl that was attached to the Afrika Korps headquarters. Due to the fluid nature of operations in the desert, combat forces often passed close to headquarters of the opposite side. Several commanding officers of both armies were captured in the desert war.) After a time Rommel moved his headquarters southwards and away from the fighting.

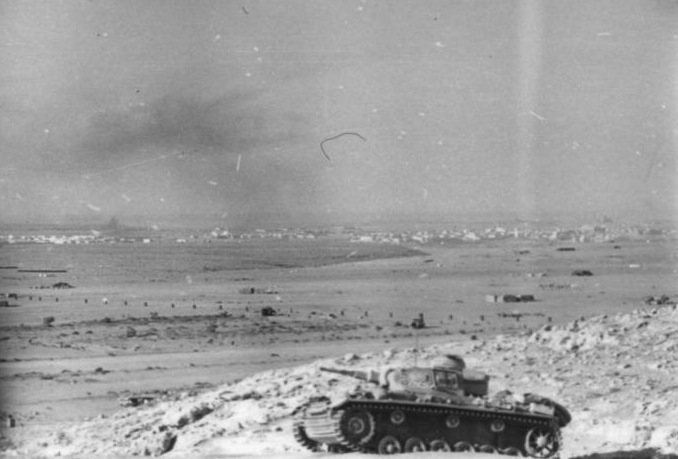
A Pz Mk III at the first escarpment, with Mersa Matruh in the distance

The 29th Indian Infantry Brigade arrived at the regrouping point at Fuka late in the afternoon of 28 June, followed by the 21st Panzer Division. The commander of the brigade had assembled transport in case a quick withdrawal was necessary but the assault of 21st Panzer was too quick and the brigade was overrun and destroyed. Early on the morning of 29 June, the 90th Light Division and the Italian 133rd Armoured Division "Littorio" encircled Mersa Matruh. The 10th Indian Division tried to break out on the night of 28 June but was repulsed by "Littorio". The Mersa Matruh positions had been bombarded by the artillery of the 27th Infantry Division "Brescia" and 102nd Motorised Division "Trento", which along with the 90th Light Division represented the main force investing the stronghold and after infantry fighting and failed break-out attempts, the stronghold sought to capitulate. On June 29, the 7th Bersaglieri Regiment entered the stronghold and accepted the surrender of 6,000 British troops and captured a mass of supplies and equipment.

The 90th Light Division was allowed no time to rest and quickly sent down the coast road after the retreating Eighth Army. An entry in the 90th Light War Diary rued "After all our days of hard fighting, we did not get a chance to rest or bathe in the ocean". The 21st Panzer Division intercepted some British columns near Fuka and took another 1,600 prisoners. Rommel diverted the Afrika Korps inland some 15 mi (24 km) to try to cut off more of the Eighth Army. Small columns from both sides raced across the broken ground towards El Alamein. Units became intermingled and disorganised and opposing columns ran parallel to each other, with German columns sometimes running in front of the retreating British. The columns sometimes exchanged fire and as most of the Panzerarmee transport was captured British or American equipment, it was often difficult to distinguish friend from foe.

== Aftermath ==
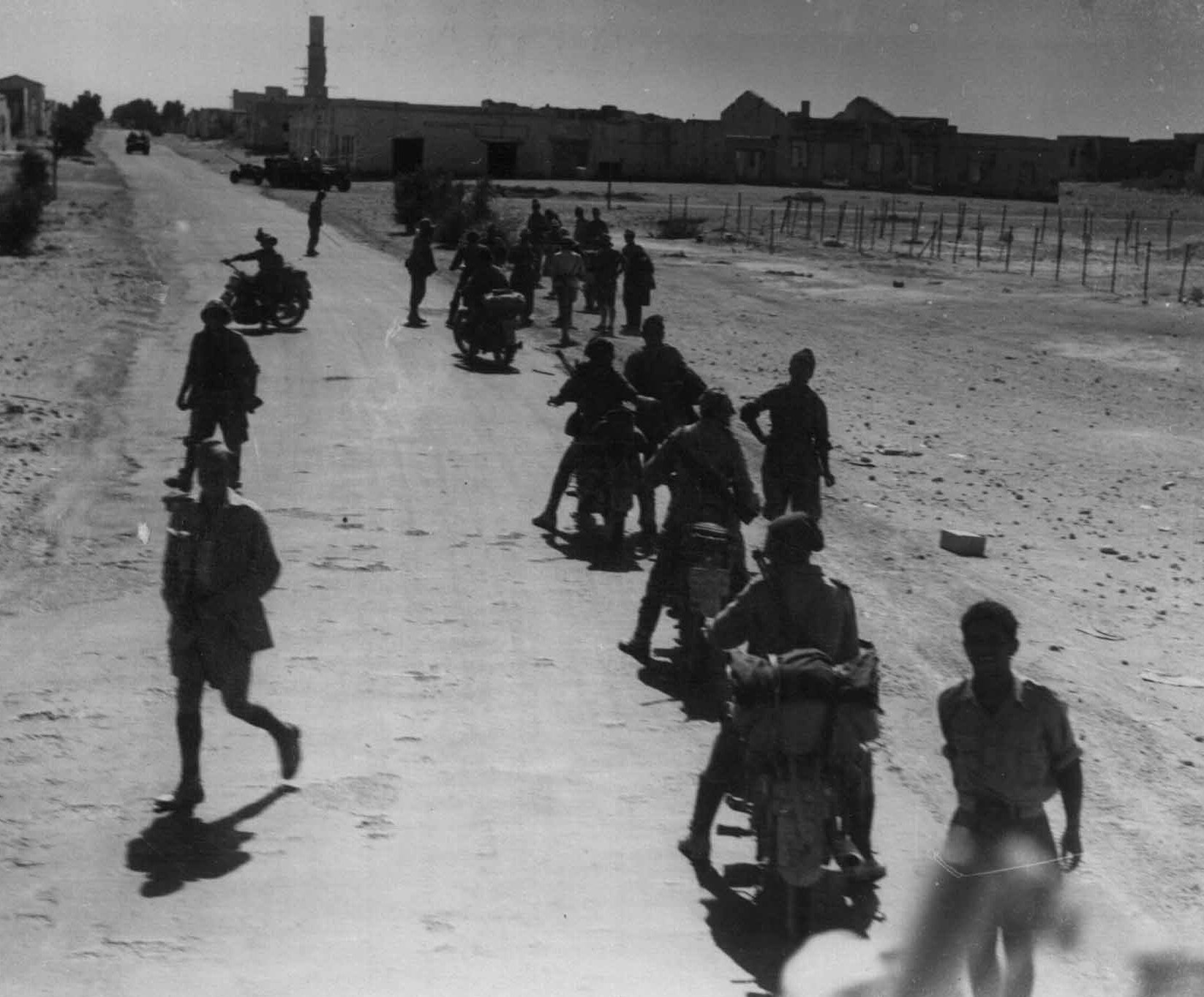
The 7th Bersaglieri Regiment enters Mersa Matruh.

The fight at Matruh took its character from the disposition of the Eighth Army forces, Rommel's misunderstanding of them and the chronic lack of co-ordination between British infantry and armoured units. After the war Field Marshal Henry Maitland Wilson said "The XIII Corps just disappeared and left X Corps up the pole". Holmes estimated that only 60 per cent of X Corps got back to El Alamein. Friedrich von Mellenthin, Rommel's intelligence officer during the battle, commented "As a result of Auchinleck’s hesitation, the British not only lost a great opportunity of destroying the Panzerarmee but suffered a serious defeat, which might easily have turned into an irretrievable disaster. I stress this point, for to the student of generalship there are few battles so instructive as Mersa Matruh".

Following its escape from Matruh, X Corps was scattered, badly disorganised and withdrawn to the Nile as "Delta Force", unable to participate in the early part of the First Battle of El Alamein. The 2nd New Zealand Division did not regroup at Fuka but continued to El Alamein and went into the line. About 8,000 Allied prisoners were taken during the battle, 6,000 at Matruh, where forty British tanks were also lost. Large supply dumps were captured by the Axis and enough equipment for a division.

Axis aircraft operating from the Matruh airfields were 160 mi (260 km) from the naval base at Alexandria and the Mediterranean Fleet was dispersed to eastern Mediterranean ports. The head of the US Army Intelligence Division predicted the British position in Egypt would collapse in less than a week. Civilians fled east to Palestine and the air of Cairo was thick with the smoke of burning official and secret documents ("Ash Wednesday"). The British consulate was swamped with people requesting visas. The British army flooded sections of the Nile Delta, prepared to demolish infrastructure and built up defensive positions at Alexandria and the Suez canal. A scorched earth policy was discussed but decided against.

Mellenthin wrote,

Rommel may have been lucky, but Mersa Matruh was certainly a brilliant German victory and gave us great hopes of 'bouncing' the Eighth Army out of the Alamein line.

Auchinleck rallied the Eighth Army and in a month of battle checked the German advance at the First Battle of El Alamein. Both sides were exhausted but the British still held their positions.

The fighting lasted on and off the whole month. When it died down both sides were exhausted, but the British were still in possession of the vital ground.

— Playfair

The Allied crisis passed and the Eighth Army began to build up its strength to resume offensive operations. The battle also functioned as a large morale-booster for Rommel's Italian troops, as it had been predominantly executed by them, albeit under German command.

== See also ==
- List of British military equipment of World War II
- List of German military equipment of World War II
- List of Italian military equipment in World War II

== Bibliography ==
- Bierman, John; Smith, Colin (2002). Alamein: War Without Hate. London: Viking. ISBN 978-0-670-91109-7.
- Buckingham, W. F. (2010). Tobruk: The Great Siege, 1941–42. New York: Random House.
- Butler, Daniel Allen (2015). Field Marshal: The Life and Death of Erwin Rommel. Havertown, PA; Oxford: Casemate. ISBN 978-1-61200-297-2.
- Jackson, Sir William G. F. (1975). The Battle for North Africa, 1940–43. New York: Mason/Charter. ISBN 0-88405-131-5 – via Archive Foundation.
- Kay, Robin (1958). 27 (Machine Gun) Battalion. The Official History of New Zealand in the Second World War 1939–1945 (New Zealand Electronic Text Collection ed.). Wellington, N.Z.: War History Branch, Dept. of Internal Affairs. OCLC 566216361.
- Lewin, Ronald (1998) [1968]. Rommel As Military Commander. New York: B&N Books. ISBN 978-0-7607-0861-3 – via Archive Foundation.
- Liddell Hart, B. H. (1970). History of the Second World War. New York: Putnam. OCLC 878163245 – via Archive Foundation.
- Mellenthin, F. W. von (1971) [1956]. Panzer Battles: A Study of the Employment of Armour in the Second World War (pbk. repr. ed.). New York: Ballantine Books. ISBN 0-345-24440-0.
- Neillands, Robin (2005). The Desert Rats: 7th Armoured Division 1940–45. London: Aurum. ISBN 1-84513-115-0.
- Playfair, I. S. O.; with Flynn, F. C.; Molony, C. J. C.; Gleave, T. P. (2004) [1960]. Butler, Sir James (ed.). The Mediterranean and Middle East: British Fortunes reach their Lowest Ebb (September 1941 to September 1942). History of the Second World War, United Kingdom Military Series. Vol. III (pbk. facs. repr. Naval & Military Press, Uckfield ed.). London: HMSO. ISBN 1-845740-67-X.
- Rommel, Erwin (1982) [1953]. Liddell Hart, B. H. (ed.). The Rommel Papers. New York: Da Capo Press. ISBN 978-0-306-80157-0.
- Walker, Ian (2004). Iron Hulls, Iron Hearts: Mussolini's Elite Armoured Divisions in North Africa. Ramsbury: Crowood. ISBN 1-86126-646-4.
- Young, Desmond (1950). Rommel The Desert Fox. New York: Harper & Row. OCLC 48067797.
- Zabecki, D. T. (1999). World War II in Europe: An Encyclopedia. Garland Reference Library of the Humanities (vol: 1,254). Vol. I. New York: Garland (Taylor & Francis). ISBN 978-0-8240-7029-8.
