= Francesco Antonio Arena =

Italian general (1889–1945)

- Born: 27 March 1889; Pizzoni, Kingdom of Italy
- Died: 28 January 1945 (aged 55); Wieleń, Poland
- Military career
- Allegiance: Kingdom of Italy
- Branch: Royal Italian Army
- Rank: Brigadier General
- Commands: 51st Infantry Regiment "Alpi"; 132nd Armoured Division Ariete; 36th Infantry Division Forlì
- Conflicts: Italo-Turkish War; Battle of the Two Palms; World War I; Battles of the Isonzo; Battle of Vittorio Veneto; Italian invasion of Albania; World War II; Battle of Gazala; Battle of Tobruk; First battle of El Alamein; Battle of Alam Halfa; Second battle of El Alamein
- Awards: Silver Medal of Military Valour (four times); Bronze Medal of Military Valour; Order of the Crown of Italy; Colonial Order of the Star of Italy

Francesco Antonio Arena (27 March 1889 – 28 January 1945) was an Italian general during World War II, most notable for having commanded the 132nd Armoured Division Ariete during the second battle of El Alamein.

== Biography ==
He was born in Pizzoni, Calabria, on 27 March 1889, the son of Vincenzo Arena and Clementina Scandale. In 1909 he enlisted in the Royal Italian Army as a volunteer officer cadet in the 20th Infantry Regiment "Brescia", and in 1910 he was commissioned as infantry second lieutenant. In 1911 he fought in Cyrenaica with the 79th Infantry Regiment during the Italo-Turkish War, earning a Silver Medal of Military Valour for his behaviour during the Battle of the Two Palms in March 1912. In 1914, after promotion to lieutenant, he was stationed in Somalia, assigned to the Royal Corps of Colonial Troops, and in 1915 he was promoted to captain.

In April 1916 he was repatriated and assigned to the 2nd Infantry Regiment, fighting on the Italian Front during World War I. On 24 May 1917 he was wounded on Mount San Marco, near Gorizia, during the Tenth Battle of the Isonzo, and awarded another Silver Medal for Military Valor. He was later promoted to major and in late October 1918 participated in the battle of Vittorio Veneto; for the taking of the heavily defended village of Alano di Piave he was awarded the Bronze Medal of Military Valour.

After attending a two-year course at the Turin Army School of War between 1920 and 1921, Arena was assigned to the command of the Staff Officer Corps; in 1926 he was promoted to lieutenant colonel. In January 1933 he was appointed Deputy Chief of Staff of the Military Command of Sicily. The following year he was transferred to the Army Command of Naples, where he remained until 1935; after promotion to colonel in 1936, he assumed command of the 51st Infantry Regiment "Alpi".

At the end of 1937 he was assigned to the Ministry of War, and in April 1939 he was appointed commander of the base set up in Bari, in preparation of the invasion of Albania. In June 1939 he assumed command of the services of the Armed Forces Command in Tirana till October, when he returned to Bari as Chief of Staff of the IX Army Corps, a post he was still holding when Italy entered World War II on 10 June 1940. On 1 January 1942 he was promoted to brigadier general and the next month he became deputy commander of the 132nd Armoured Division Ariete (General Giuseppe De Stefanis), fighting in North Africa. In June 1942 he was awarded another Silver Medal of Military Valour for his role in the battle of Gazala. On 28 June 1942 Arena replaced De Stefanis (who had been promoted to the commando of the XX Corps following the death of General Ettore Baldassarre) at the command of the "Ariete" until 25 July, when General Adolfo Infante was given command of the division. After Infante left command of the division, on 17 September 1942, Arena assumed command once again and was thus its commander during the second battle of El Alamein, in which the division was annihilated.

In early 1943 he was repatriated and placed at the disposal of the Ministry of War until, in March of the same year, he became commander of the 36th Infantry Division Forlì stationed near Athens. After the Armistice of Cassibile, in September 1943, he was captured by the Germans and, having refused to collaborate, was imprisoned in Oflag 64/Z in Schokken, Poland.

In late January 1945, in the face of the advancing Red Army, the prisoners were evacuated westwards with a forced march through the snow. During the march Arena, along with Air Force General Alberto Briganti and Colonel Carlo Unia, managed to escape and was hidden by a Polish farmer near Wieleń. On the following day, while Unia and the farmer were away, two Soviet soldiers entered the house and mistook Arena and Briganti for Fascist collaborators of the Germans; the two generals were lined up against a wall and shot. Briganti miraculously survived with non-fatal wounds, but Arena was killed. His remains were returned to Italy in 1960, and buried in the Verano Cemetery in Rome.
