= 102nd Motorized Division "Trento" =

Motorized infantry division of the Royal Italian Army during World War II

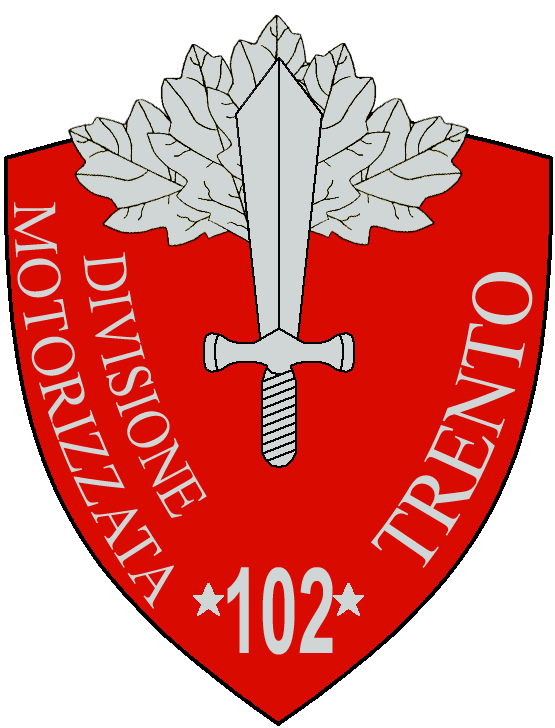
- 102nd Motorized Division "Trento" insignia
- Active: 1935–1942
- Country: Kingdom of Italy
- Branch: Royal Italian Army
- Type: Motorized infantry
- Size: Division
- Part of: XXI Army Corps
- Garrison/HQ: Trento
- Engagements: Western Desert Campaign

Insignia
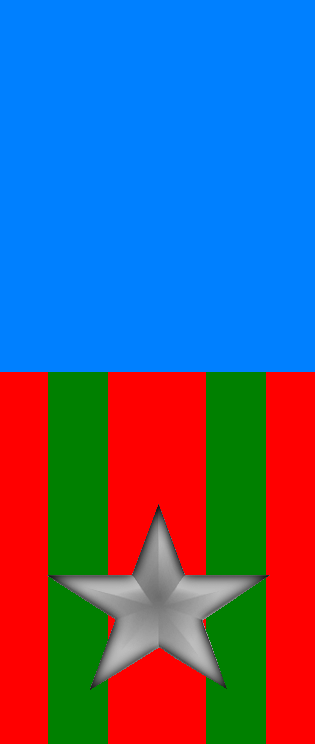
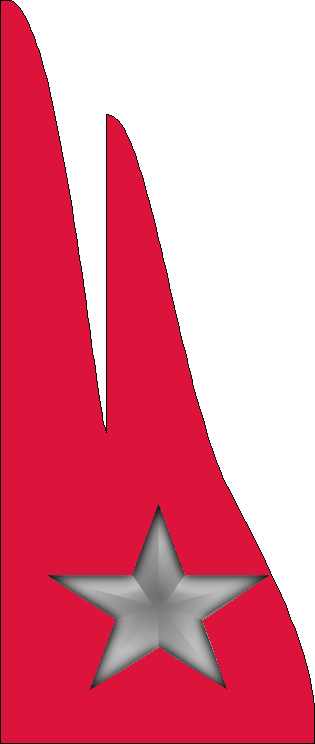
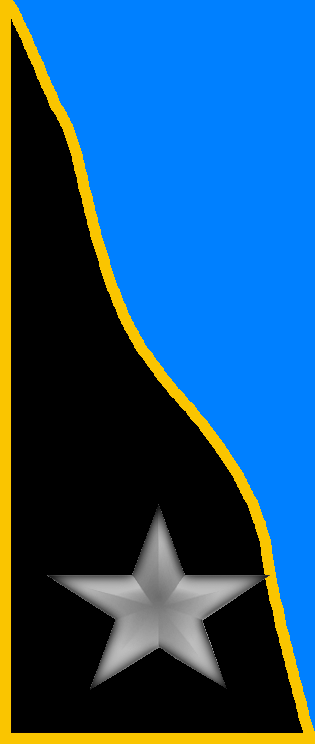
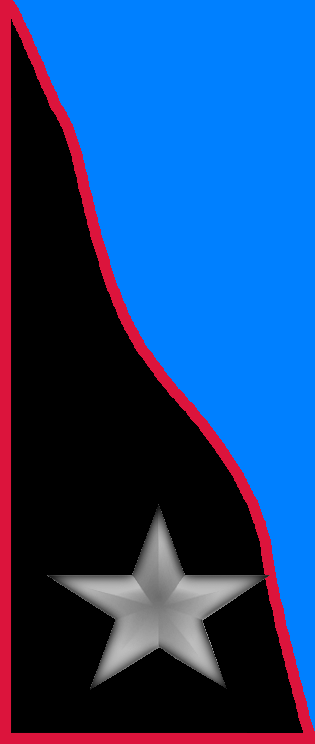
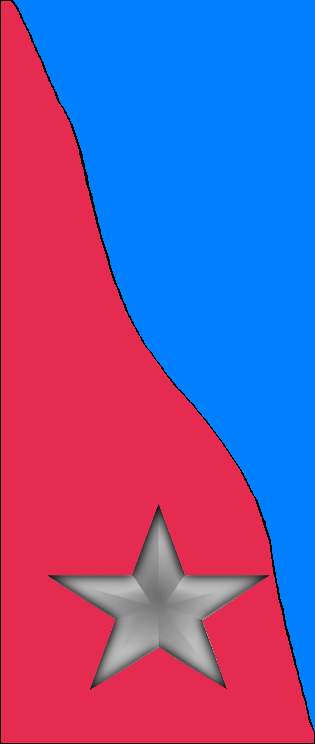
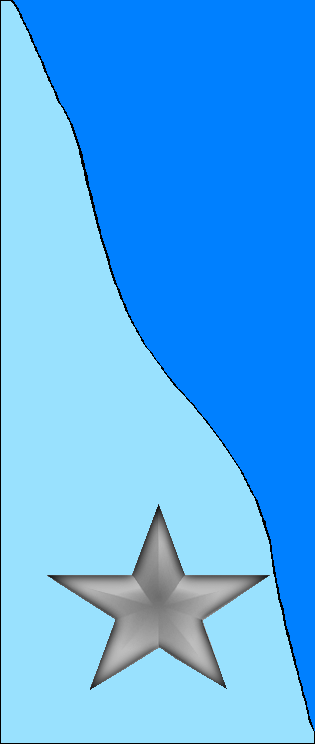
- Identification symbol: Trento Division gorget patches

The 102nd Motorized Division "Trento" (Italian: 102ª Divisione motorizzata "Trento") was a motorized infantry division of the Royal Italian Army during World War II. The division was formed in 1935 and named for the city of Trento, where its infantry and artillery regiments were based. The Trento served in the Western Desert Campaign and was destroyed in the Second Battle of El Alamein in November 1942.

== History ==
The division's lineage begins with the Brigade "Sicilia" established in Naples on 16 April 1861 with the 61st and 62nd infantry regiments.

=== World War I ===
The brigade fought on the Italian front in World War I and was disbanded after the war in October 1920. On 15 October 1926 the brigade was disbanded and its two regiments assigned to the VIII Infantry Brigade, which already included the 65th Infantry Regiment "Valtellina". The brigade was the infantry component of the 8th Territorial Division of Piacenza, which also included the 21st Field Artillery Regiment.

=== Formation ===
The division was raised as 1st Motorized Division "Trento" on 15 July 1935 in the city of Trento and consisted initially of the 115th Infantry Regiment "Treviso", 116th Infantry Regiment "Treviso", and the reformed 46th Artillery Regiment, which had served in World War I. The division soon changed its number from 1st to 32nd, and in December 1935 deployed to Libya to replace units deployed for the Second Italo-Ethiopian War. In August 1936 it returned to Trento and on 1 November of the same year the 116th Infantry Regiment "Treviso" was disbanded and replaced by the 62nd Infantry Regiment "Sicilia" from the 8th Infantry Division "Po". On 15 May 1937 the division transferred the 115th Infantry Regiment "Treviso" to the 62nd Infantry Division "Marmarica" and received the 61st Infantry Regiment "Sicilia" from the 8th Infantry Division "Po". On 2 January 1939 the division changed its name to 102nd Motorized Division "Trento" and on the same date the 61st and 62nd infantry regiments, and the 46th Artillery Regiment changed their names to "Trento". On 22 January 1939 the division added the 7th Bersaglieri Regiment based in Bolzano.

=== World War II ===
On 10 June 1940 Italy entered World War II and invaded France. The Trento was assigned to the Army of the Po as reserve. In March 1941 the division disembarked in Libya for the Western Desert Campaign. While the division was in Libya its regimental depots raised the infantry and artillery units of the 103rd Infantry Division "Piacenza", which was activated on 15 March 1942.

==== Western Desert Campaign ====
In December 1940 the British Western Desert Force commenced the Operation Compass to expel the Italian 10th Army from Egypt. The British offensive resulted in the destruction of the Italian 10th Army and the conquest of Cyrenaica. Beginning in January 1941 Italy and Germany sent reinforcement to Italian Libya to reinforce the Italian 5th Army and stop the British offensive. The Trento was ordered to North Africa in March 1941 and gathered in Misrata.

In April 1941 the Trento participated in the Axis counterattack, which forced the British and Commonwealth forces into retreat. On 10 April the Trento reached Marsa al-Brega, on 12 April Derna and on the 13th the division arrived in Ain el Gazala. On 15 April the division defeated British forces at Acroma.

While the Australian 9th Infantry Division fell back to the fortified port of Tobruk, British and other Commonwealth forces withdrew a further 100 miles (160 km) east to Sollum, on the Libyan–Egyptian border. These moves initiated the 240-day-long Siege of Tobruk. On 20 April 1941 the Trento assembled at Bu Amud to the East of Tobruk for the siege. On 30 April the 62nd Infantry Regiment "Trento" was detached from the division and sent to the Bardia-Sollum sector further east, while the rest of the Trento remained at Tobruk.

===== Operation Brevity and Battleaxe =====
On 15 May 1941 the British XIII Corps launched Operation Brevity. The objective of the operation was to clear the Halfaya Pass and secure several footholds to create advantageous conditions from which to launch Operation Battleaxe. The principal Axis opposition was Kampfgruppe von Herff, which included a battalion of the 62nd Infantry Regiment "Trento". After a day of inconclusive fighting British forces took control of the pass. Total Italian casualties during the operation are unknown, though at least 347 men were taken prisoner during the operation. German forces retook the pass on 27 May 1941 during Operation Skorpion.

On 15 June 1941 the 62nd Infantry Regiment "Trento" was attacked by British forces during Operation Battleaxe. The regiment had to abandon its positions at Halfaya Pass and Fort Capuzzo, but German-Italian forces retook the lost positions in fierce counterattacks on 17 and 18 June 1941. In September 1941 the Trento was reorganized as an Tipo AS 1942 division.

===== Operation Crusader =====
On 18 November 1941 the British Eighth Army launched Operation Crusader to relieve the siege of Tobruk. The Trento, which together with the 17th Infantry Division "Pavia", the 25th Infantry Division "Bologna", and the 27th Infantry Division "Brescia" formed the Italian XXI Army Corps, came under attack from the defenders of Tobruk and British spearheads arriving from Egypt. On 7 December forces British pressed their offensive and by 9 December the Trento had to fall back towards Ain el Gazala. On 10 December 1941 the British lifted the siege of Tobruk. On 14 December the Trento began to retreat, reaching Ajdabiya on 23 December. On 29 December 1941 the division's 7th Bersaglieri Regiment left the division and became a corps asset of the Italian XXI Army Corps.

After reorganizing at El Agheila the German-Italian Panzer Group Africa counterattacked on 21 January 1942 and drove British forces back to Ain el Gazala.

===== Battle of Gazala =====
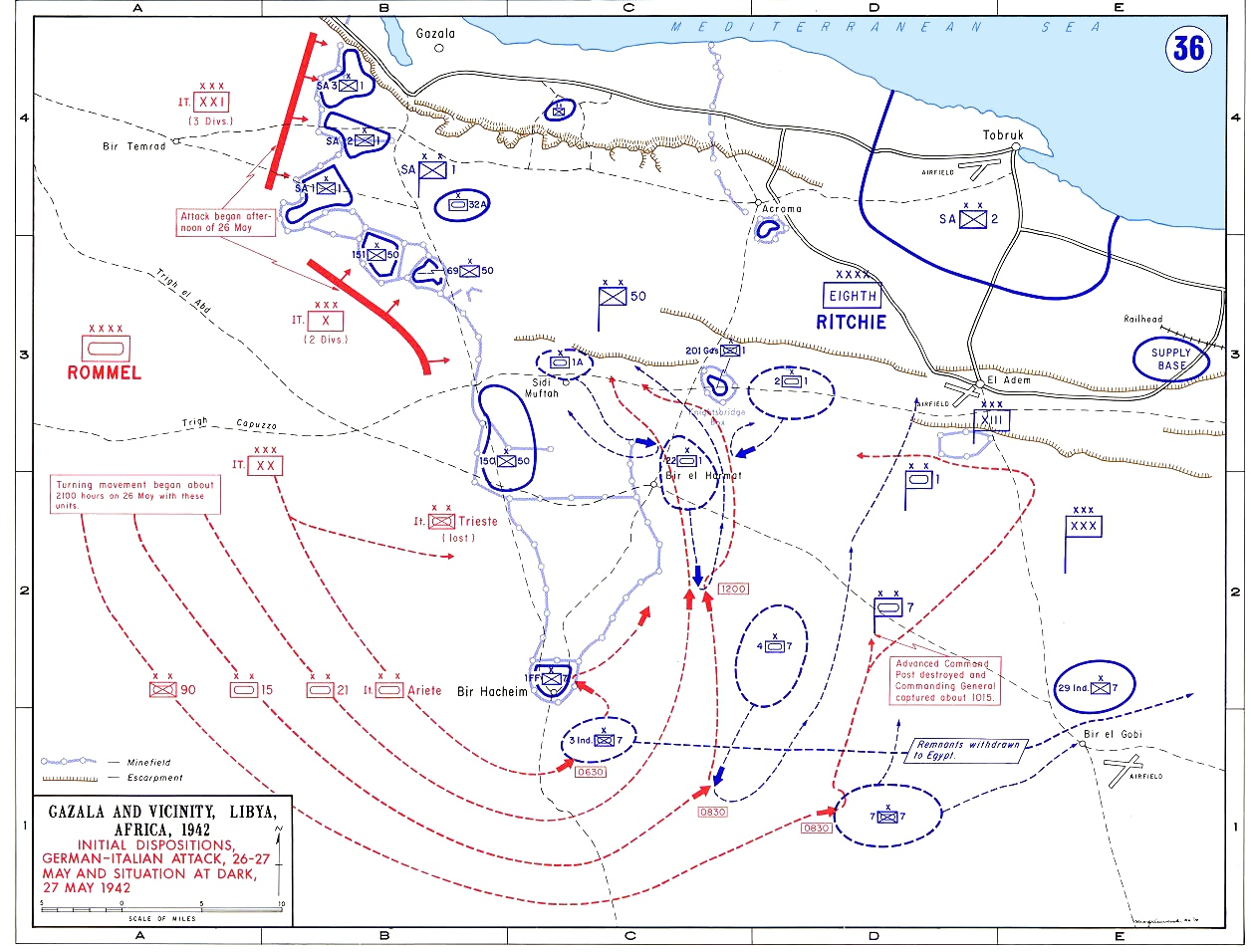
Battle of Gazala lines of attack

On 26 May 1942 Axis forces commenced the Battle of Gazala. The plan was for the armored and motorized divisions to perform a right flanking attack, while the Italian XXI Army Corps and X Army Corps, which included the Trento, would advance parallel to the coast road. On the first day of the battle the Trento attacked the 1st South African Infantry Division at Bir Belabat and took the position the next day. On 15 June British forces abandoned the Gazala Line and the Trento pursued the retreating Commonwealth forces, capturing 6,000 prisoners on June 16.

On 20 June 1942 the Trento reached Acroma on the outskirts of the Tobruk perimeter. The division swung around the British defenders at Tobruk and pursued the British forces retreating towards Egypt. On 25 June the Trento arrived in Bardia, Sollum and Sidi Barrani.

===== El Alamein battles =====
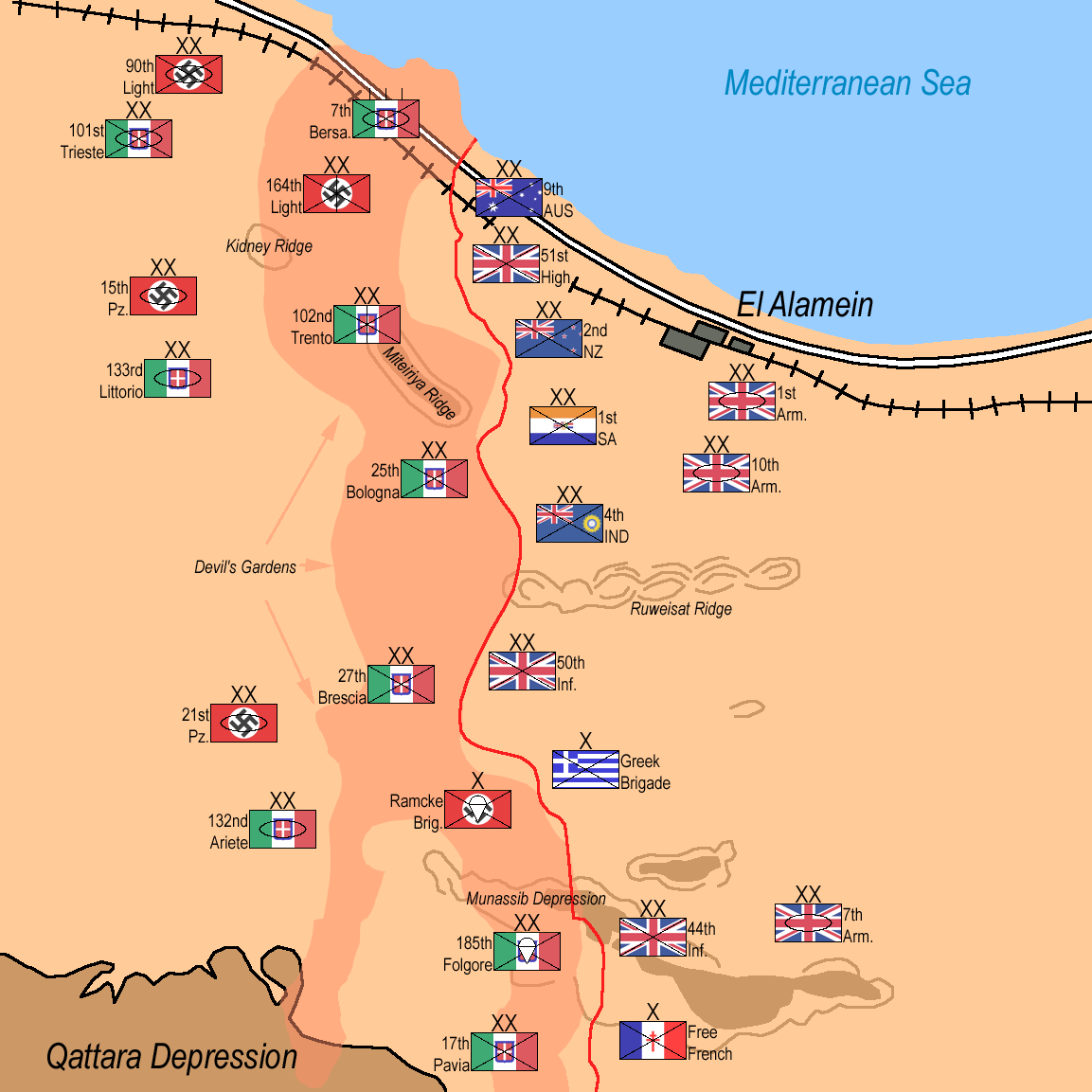
Second Battle of El Alamein: Division locations before the battle

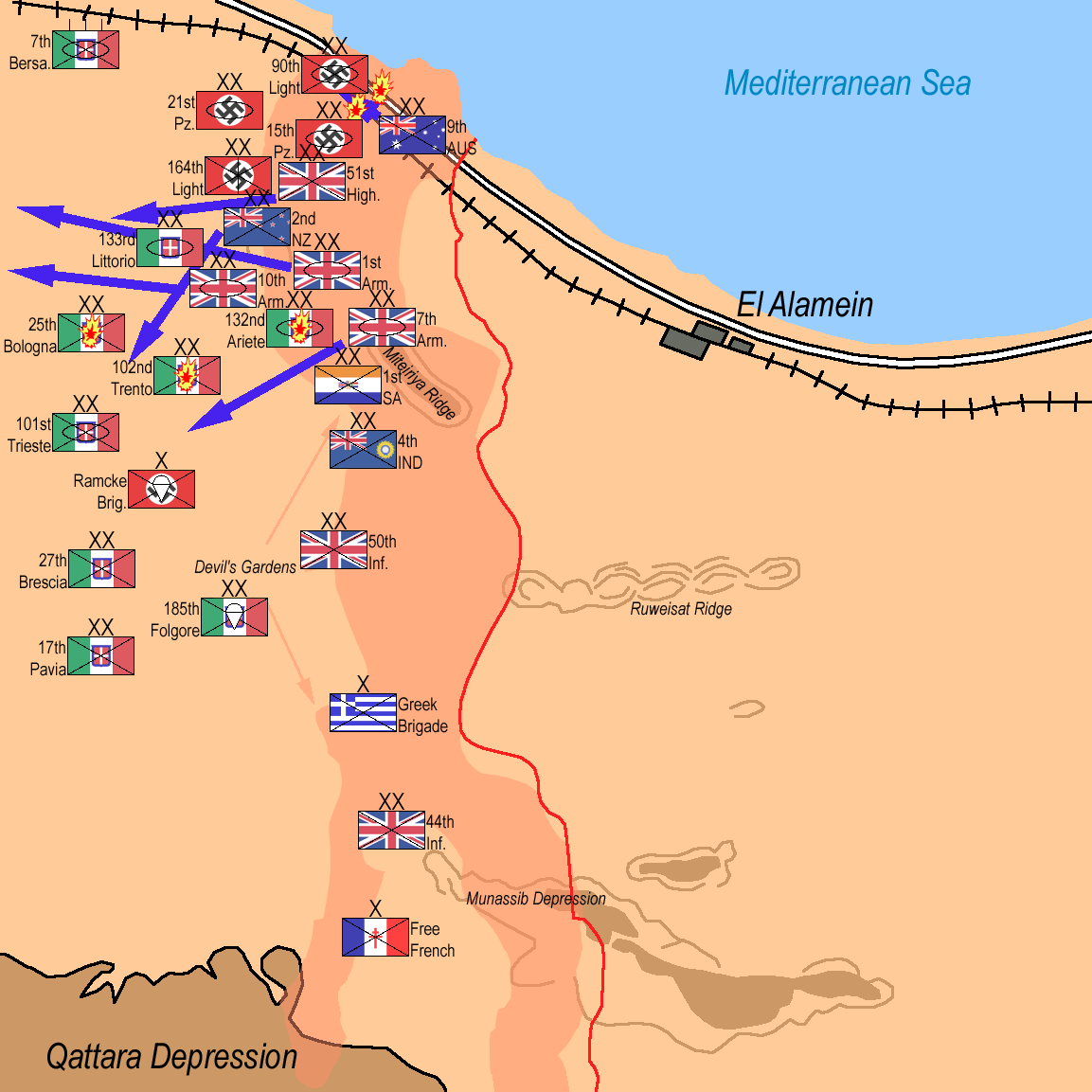
Second Battle of El Alamein: Allied forces break through at 7am on 4 November; Trento, Bologna, and Ariete divisions destroyed

From 26 June 1942 the Trento was engaged in the Battle of Mersa Matruh. On 27 June the division began its attack on Mersa Matruh, which fell on 29 June. On 1 July 1942 the Trento reached the area of El Alamein and the next day joined in the First Battle of El Alamein. On 2 July the Trento deployed on Miteirya Ridge, where it was surprised by a British attack. The Trento put up a tenacious defense on Miteirya, delaying the Allied advance for several hours and allowing an Italian armored reconnaissance force to launch a devastating counterattack. Despite fresh British attacks after 10 July the Trento managed to hold its positions on Miteirya until the end of the battle on 27 July.

On 30 August 1942 Axis forces launched the Battle of Alam el Halfa with the aim to outflank the British position at El Alamein. The Trento attacked the positions of the 9th Australian Division and 1st South African Infantry Division to fix the divisions in place, while the Axis' main force attacked further South. By 5 September 1942 the Axis forces had fallen back to their starting positions and began to dig in for the expected British counterattack.

The British began the Second Battle of El Alamein on 23 October 1942 and the Trento, which was positioned on Miteirya Ridge came under attack from the 2nd New Zealand Division and 10th Armoured Division on 24 October. By 25 October the Allies had broken through the minefields and were fought the Trento on top of Miteiriya Ridge. By then the Trento had lost half its infantry and most of its artillery to incessant British artillery and air attacks. The intense combat continued until 4 November when General Erwin Rommel ordered his divisions to retreat. However the Trento and the 132nd Armored Division "Ariete" were surrounded by British forces at Bir el Abd and destroyed. The Trento was declared lost due to wartime events on 25 November 1942.

== Organization ==
=== 1940-41 ===
102nd Motorized Division "Trento" organization in 1940

102nd Motorized Division "Trento" organization in 1941

- 102nd Motorized Division "Trento", in Trento
  - Headquarters
    - Command Company
    - 160th Carabinieri Section
    - 161st Carabinieri Section
    - 109th Field Post Office
    - 102nd Motorized Division Command Transport Squad
  - 61st Motorized Infantry Regiment "Trento", (Note: Named 61st Infantry Regiment "Sicilia" until 1939 when the army reorganized its divisions as binary divisions and divisional infantry regiments took the name of the division.) in Trento
    - Command Company
    - 3 × Fusilier battalions
      - Command Company, 3 × Fusilier companies, 1 × Weapons Company (Breda M37 heavy machine guns and 45mm mod. 35 mortars)
    - Support Weapons Battery (65/17 mod. 13 infantry support guns)
    - Mortar Company (81mm mod. 35 mortars)
  - 62nd Motorized Infantry Regiment "Trento", (Note: Named 62nd Infantry Regiment "Sicilia" until 1939 when the army reorganized its divisions as binary divisions and divisional infantry regiments took the name of the division.) in Trento
    - Command Company
    - 3 × Fusilier battalions
      - Command Company, 3 × Fusilier companies, 1 × Weapons Company (Breda M37 heavy machine guns and 45mm mod. 35 mortars)
    - Support Weapons Battery (65/17 mod. 13 infantry support guns)
    - Mortar Company (81mm mod. 35 mortars)
  - 7th Bersaglieri Regiment, in Bolzano (transferred on 29 December 1941 to the XXI Army Corps)
    - Command Company
    - VIII Motorcyclists Battalion (reorganized as VIII Support Weapons Battalion in September 1941)
      - Command Company, 3 × Motorcyclists companies
    - VIII Support Weapons Battalion (formed in September 1941)
      - Command Platoon, 1 × Machine Gun Company (Breda M37 heavy machine guns), 1 × Mortar Company (81mm mod. 35 mortars), 1 × Anti-aircraft Company (20/65 mod. 35 anti-aircraft guns)
    - X Auto-transported Battalion
      - Command Company, 2 × Bersaglieri companies, 1 × Anti-tank Company (47/32 mod. 35 anti-tank guns; formed in North Africa)
    - XI Auto-transported Battalion
      - Command Company, 2 × Bersaglieri companies, 1 × Anti-tank Company (47/32 mod. 35 anti-tank guns; formed in North Africa)
    - 106th Cannons Company (47/32 mod. 35 anti-tank guns; disbanded in September 1941)
    - 156th Bersaglieri Motorcyclists Company (formed in October 1941 and remained with the division when the regiment exited the division)
    - Transport Unit
  - 46th Artillery Regiment "Trento", in Trento
    - Command Unit
    - I Group (100/17 mod. 14 howitzers)
    - II Group (75/27 mod. 06 field guns)
    - III Group (75/27 mod. 06 field guns)
    - 7th Anti-aircraft Battery (20/65 mod. 35 anti-aircraft guns)
    - 8th Anti-aircraft Battery (20/65 mod. 35 anti-aircraft guns)
    - 302nd Anti-tank Battery (47/32 mod. 35 anti-tank guns; joined the regiment in August 1941)
    - Ammunition and Supply Unit
  - DLI Machine Gun Battalion (reorganized as a DLI Anti-tank Battalion in September 1941)
  - CII Replacements Battalion (joined the division in October 1941)
  - LI Mixed Engineer Battalion
  - 51st Medical Section
    - 57th Field Hospital
    - 897th Field Hospital
    - 2 × Field hospitals
    - 1 × Surgical unit
  - 51st Supply Section
  - 9th Mixed Transport Unit
  - 204th Transport Section (4th CC.NN. Division "3 Gennaio" unit, joined the Trento in North Africa)

Attached to the division from January 1941:

- 102nd Anti-tank Company (47/32 mod. 35 anti-tank guns; entered the DLI Anti-tank Battalion in September 1941)
- 104th Anti-tank Company (47/32 mod. 35 anti-tank guns; entered the DLI Anti-tank Battalion in September 1941)
- 106th Anti-tank Company (47/32 mod. 35 anti-tank guns; entered the DLI Anti-tank Battalion in September 1941)

Assigned to the division from September 1941:

- LXI Machine Gun Battalion (from the destroyed 61st Infantry Division "Sirte")

Attached to the division from March 1941:

- XLIII Anti-aircraft Group (7.5cm PL vz.37 anti-aircraft guns; attached to the 46th Artillery Regiment "Trento")

=== 1942 ===
On 2 January 1942, after the Italian divisions had suffered heavy losses of personnel and equipment during the British Operation Crusader, General Ettore Bastico, the commander of Axis forces in North Africa, ordered that frontline infantry divisions in North Africa, including the 102nd Motorized Division "Trento", but not the 101st Motorized Division "Trieste", should be reorganized according to the new Auto-transportable North-African-type 42 table of organization and equipment. To reduce the logistic requirements the divisions were reduced to 7,000 men and all their support and transport units were transferred to the direct control to the Italian North African Armed Forces Command. The divisions' infantry regiments were cut down to two battalions of four fusilier companies each and the regiment's heavy weapons, along with the heavy weapons of the divisions' Support Weapons Battalion, were distributed equally among the companies. Each fusilier company then consisted of a command, a fusilier platoon, a machine gun platoon with three Breda M37 heavy machine guns, an anti-tank platoon with three S-18/1000 anti-tank rifles, and an anti-tank platoon with three 47/32 mod. 35 anti-tank guns. Bastico also ordered that, if men and materiel should become available, each regiment was to form a third battalion. Additionally it was planned to strengthen the divisions' artillery regiments by adding a fourth artillery group equipped with 100/17 mod. 16 howitzers and an anti-aircraft/anti-tank group with either German 8.8 cm Flak cannons or Italian 90/53 cannons. However, due to the difficulty of shipping the required materiel across the Mediterranean most infantry and artillery regiments never received the full complement of men and material. With the same order Bastico confirmed the transfer of the Trento division's 7th Bersaglieri Regiment to the XXI Army Corps. Afterwards the 102nd Motorized Division "Trento" consisted of the following units:

102nd Motorized Division "Trento" organization in 1942

- 102nd Motorized Division "Trento"
  - Headquarters
    - Command Company
    - 160th Carabinieri Section
    - 161st Carabinieri Section
    - 109th Field Post Office
    - 102nd Motorized Division Command Transport Squad
  - 61st Motorized Infantry Regiment "Trento"
    - Command Company
    - 3 × Fusilier battalions (initially 2 × Fusilier battalions, but by October 1942 the regiment's III Fusilier Battalion had been reformed)
      - Command Company, 4 × Fusilier companies, each consisting of a command, and 1 × Fusilier Platoon, 1 × Machine Gun Platoon (Breda M37 heavy machine guns), 1 × Anti-tank Platoon (S-18/1000 anti-tank rifles), 1 × Anti-tank Platoon (47/32 mod. 35 anti-tank guns)
    - Mortar Company (81mm mod. 35 mortars)
  - 62nd Motorized Infantry Regiment "Trento"
    - Command Company
    - 3 × Fusilier battalions (initially 2 × Fusilier battalions, but by October 1942 the regiment's III Fusilier Battalion had been reformed)
      - Command Company, 4 × Fusilier companies, each consisting of a command, and 1 × Fusilier Platoon, 1 × Machine Gun Platoon (Breda M37 heavy machine guns), 1 × Anti-tank Platoon (S-18/1000 anti-tank rifles), 1 × Anti-tank Platoon (47/32 mod. 35 anti-tank guns)
    - Mortar Company (81mm mod. 35 mortars)
  - 46th Artillery Regiment "Trento"
    - Command Unit
    - I Group (100/17 mod. 14 howitzers)
    - II Group (100/17 mod. 14 howitzers)
    - III Group (75/27 mod. 06 field guns)
    - IV Group (75/27 mod. 06 field guns)
    - 412th Anti-aircraft Battery (20/65 mod. 35 anti-aircraft guns)
    - 414th Anti-aircraft Battery (20/65 mod. 35 anti-aircraft guns)
    - Ammunition and Supply Unit
  - LI Mixed Engineer Battalion
  - 51st Medical Section
    - 57th Field Hospital
    - 897th Field Hospital
    - 2 × Field hospitals
    - 1 × Surgical unit
  - 51st Supply Section

Attached to the division from October 1942 and during the Second Battle of El Alamein:

- IV Anti-tank Battalion "Granatieri di Sardegna" (47/32 mod. 35 anti-tank guns)
- CCLIV Guardia alla Frontiera Artillery Group (77/28 field guns)
- CCCLV Guardia alla Frontiera Artillery Group (77/28 field guns)

== Military honors ==
For its conduct during the Western Desert campaign the President of Italy awarded on 7 April 1949 to the 7th Bersaglieri Regiment Italy's highest military honor, the Gold Medal of Military Valor.

- 7th Bersaglieri Regiment on 7 April 1949

== Commanding officers ==
The division's commanding officers were:

- Generale di Divisione Luigi Nuvoloni (1939 - 25 August 1941)
- Generale di Divisione Giuseppe De Stefanis (26 August 1941 - 25 December 1941)
- Generale di Brigata Giacomo Lombardi (acting, 26–31 December 1941)
- Generale di Divisione Giuseppe De Stefanis (1-19 January 1942)
- Generale di Brigata Carlo Gotti (20 January 1942 - 17 February 1942)
- Generale di Brigata Francesco Scotti (18 February 1942 - August 1942)
- Generale di Brigata Giorgio Masina (August 1942 - 25 November 1942, POW)

== Bibliography ==
- Paoletti, Ciro (2008). A Military History of Italy. Greenwood Publishing Group. ISBN 978-0-275-98505-9.
- Bauer, Eddy (2000) [1979]. Young, Peter (ed.). The History of World War II (Revised ed.). London, UK: Orbis Publishing. ISBN 1-85605-552-3.
- Chant, Christopher (1986). The Encyclopedia of Code Names of World War II. London: Routledge & Kegan Paul. ISBN 0-7102-0718-2.
- Erskine, David (2001) [1956]. The Scots Guards 1919–1955. Naval & Military Press. ISBN 1-84342-061-9.
- Hastings, R.H.W.S. (1950). The Rifle Brigade in the Second World War 1939–1945. Aldershot, UK: Gale & Polden. OCLC 6190324.
- Jentz, Thomas L. (1998). Tank Combat in North Africa: The Opening Rounds, Operations Sonnenblume, Brevity, Skorpion and Battleaxe, February 1941 – June 1941. Schiffer Publishing. ISBN 0-7643-0226-4.
- Mackenzie, Compton (1951). Eastern Epic: September 1939 – March 1943 Defence. Vol. I. London: Chatto & Windus. OCLC 59637091.
- Playfair, Major-General I.S.O.; with Flynn R.N., Captain F.C.; Molony, Brigadier C.J.C. & Toomer, Air Vice-Marshal S.E. (2004) [1st. pub. HMSO 1956]. Butler, J.R.M (ed.). The Mediterranean and Middle East, Volume II The Germans come to the help of their Ally (1941). History of the Second World War, United Kingdom Military Series. Naval & Military Press. ISBN 1-84574-066-1.
- Playfair, Major-General I.S.O.; with Flynn R.N., Captain F.C.; Molony, Brigadier C.J.C. & Gleave, Group Captain T.P. (2004) [1st. pub. HMSO 1960]. Butler, J.R.M (ed.). The Mediterranean and Middle East, Volume III: British Fortunes reach their Lowest Ebb (September 1941 to September 1942). History of the Second World War United Kingdom Military Series. Naval & Military Press. ISBN 1-84574-067-X.
- Playfair, Major-General I.S.O.; Molony, Brigadier C.J.C.; with Flynn R.N., Captain F.C. & Gleave, Group Captain T.P. (2004) [1st. pub. HMSO 1966]. Butler, J.R.M (ed.). The Mediterranean and Middle East, Volume IV: The Destruction of the Axis Forces in Africa. History of the Second World War United Kingdom Military Series. Uckfield, UK: Naval & Military Press. ISBN 1-84574-068-8.
