= 132nd Armored Division "Ariete" =

Armored division of the Royal Italian Army during World War II

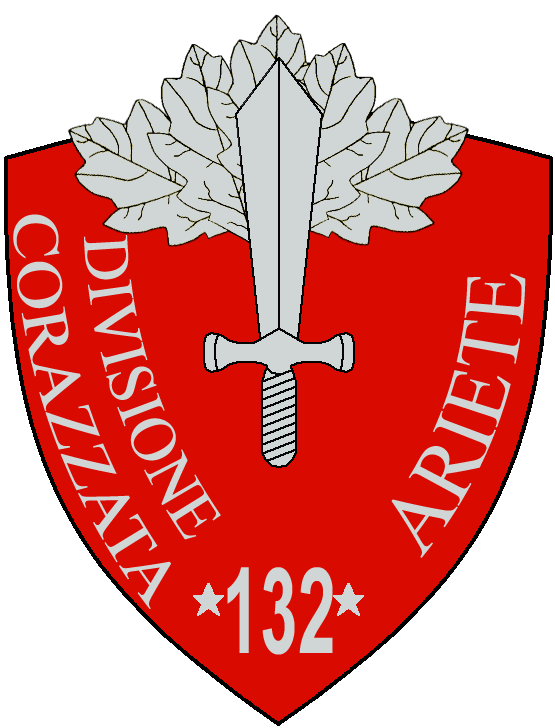
- 132nd Armored Division "Ariete" insignia
- Active: 1 February 1939 – 8 December 1942
- Country: Kingdom of Italy
- Branch: Royal Italian Army
- Type: Armored
- Size: Division
- Garrison/HQ: Milan
- Mottos: "Ferrea mole, Ferreo cuore"
- Colors: blue and red
- Mascot: Ram Head
- Engagements: Siege of Tobruk; Operation Crusader; Battle of Gazala; First Battle of El Alamein; Second Battle of El Alamein

Insignia
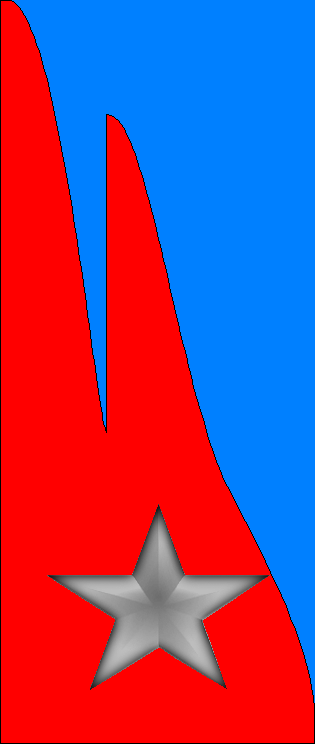
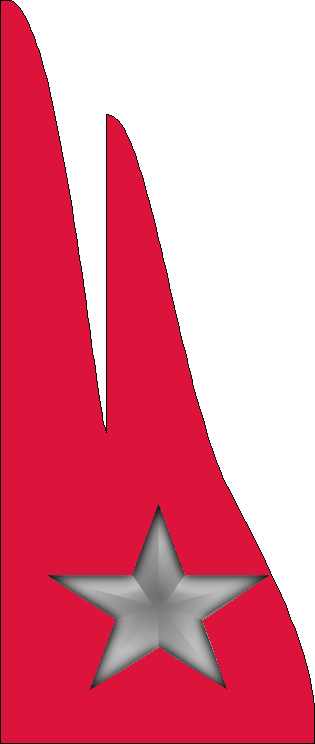
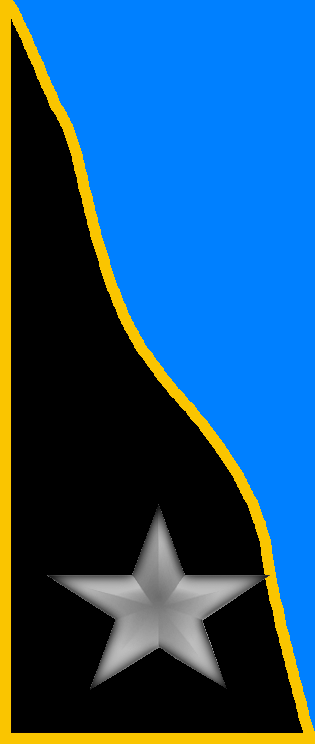
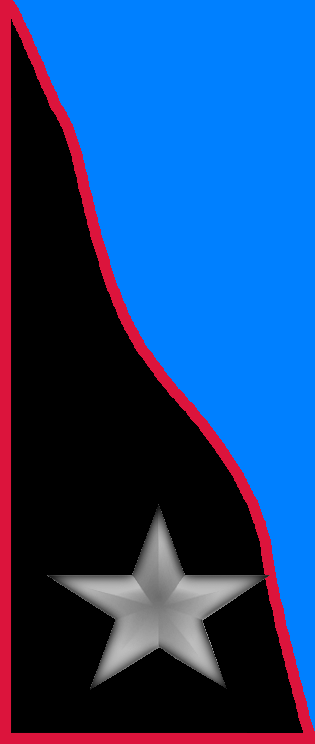
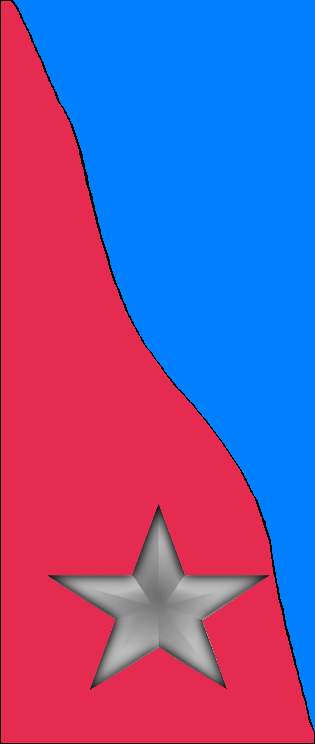
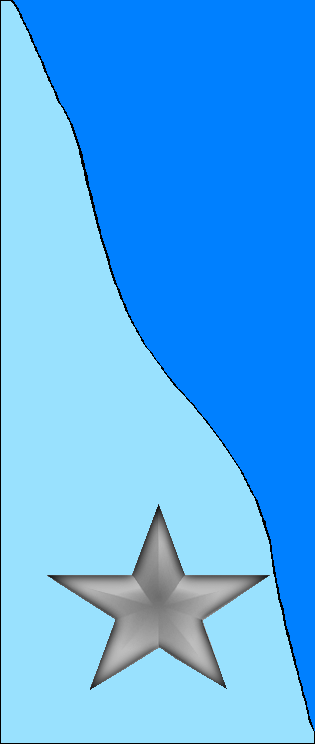
- Identification symbol: WWII Ariete gorget patches

The 132nd Armored Division "Ariete" (Italian: 132ª Divisione corazzata "Ariete") was an armored division of the Royal Italian Army during World War II. It was formed in 1939 as the second armored division after the 131st Armored Division "Centauro". The division fought in the Western Desert Campaign until being destroyed during the Second Battle of El Alamein and declared lost due to wartime events on 8 December 1942.

== History ==
On 15 July 1937, the II Motor-mechanized Brigade was formed in Milan, which consisted of the 3rd Bersaglieri Regiment and other minor units. On 1 December 1938 the 32nd Tank Infantry Regiment joined the brigade and the 3rd Bersaglieri Regiment was replaced by the 8th Bersaglieri Regiment. On the same date the brigade was renamed II Armored Brigade. On 1 February 1939 the 132nd Motorized Artillery Regiment was formed in Rovereto and assigned to the brigade, which on that date was renamed 132nd Armored Division "Ariete" (the Italian word ariete means ram).

During the invasion of France in June 1940, the division was kept in reserve. By that time the 32nd Tank Infantry Regiment had grown to eight battalions: three equipped with L3/35 tankettes, two equipped with M11/39 tanks, and three equipped with M13/40 tanks. Four of the latter battalions were transferred in the second half of 1940 to Libya: the I and II tank battalions M equipped with M11/39 tanks were transferred on 11 June 1940 to the 4th Tank Infantry Regiment and shipped to Libya, where the two battalions joined the Maletti Group. The III and V tank battalions M equipped with M13/40 tanks shipped to Libya in October respectively November and joined the Special Armored Brigade, which was also known as Babini Group. Both, the Maletti Group and the Special Armored Brigade, were part of the Italian 10th Army, which had invaded Egypt on 9 September 1940.

In December 1940 the British Western Desert Force annihilated the Italian 10th Army during Operation Compass: the I Tank Battalion M was destroyed in Egypt during the Attack on Nibeiwa, while the II Tank Battalion M was lost in the fall of Tobruk. The III Tank Battalion M and V Tank Battalion M were destroyed during the failed breakout attempt at the Battle of Beda Fomm on 6–7 February 1941.

=== Western Desert Campaign ===
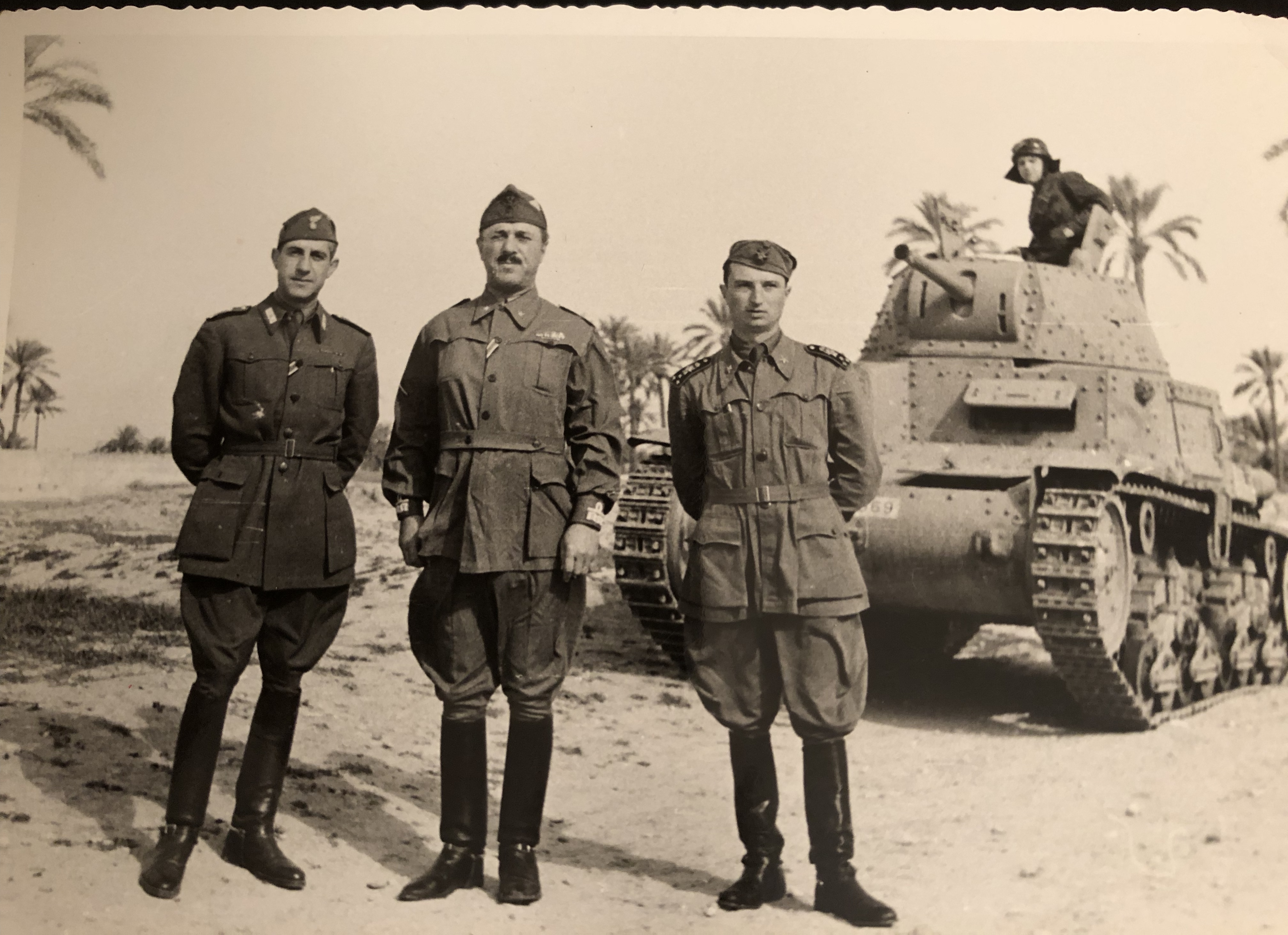
Mario Balotta (centre) with two officers of the Ariete Division in North Africa

After the rout of Italian forces during Operation Compass the Italians and Germans transferred reinforcements to Libya. The Ariete's first units disembarked Tripoli on 24 January 1941. From February 1941 to November 1942, the Ariete fought alongside the German Afrika Korps in the Western Desert Campaign. The Ariete was assigned on 15 August 1941 to the Italian Maneuver Army Corps, which on 10 March 1942 was renamed XX Army Corps.

The Ariete participated in the Axis counter-offensive to retake the Cyrenaica and the following Siege of Tobruk. On 1 May 1941, the Germans and Italians attacked Tobruk in strength. Their attack pierced the Australian defences: the Ariete captured the R3, R4, R5, R6 and R7 strongpoints, On 3 May the Australians launched a counter-attack with the 18th Brigade. The counter-attack only recaptured one strong point from what Australian historian Mark Johnston reported to be Italian defenders. This action was later known as the Battle of the Salient. On 1 September the division activated the 132nd Tank Infantry Regiment and split the 32nd Tank Infantry Regiment.

On 18 November 1941, the British launched Operation Crusader to relieve Tobruk. On 19 November 1941, the Ariete clashed at Bir el Gubi with the British 22nd Armoured Brigade and inflicted heavy losses on the inexperienced British forces. On 23 November, the 15th Panzer Division attacked the 5th South African Brigade defending Sidi Rezegh and that evening, the Ariete came up in support and the ridge was taken along with 3,400 prisoners. On 29 November the Ariete engaged the New Zealand 2nd Division at the Battle of Point 175.

On 7 December 1941, Axis forces withdrew to the Gazala position and on 15 December they continued their withdrawal to El Agheila. The Ariete retreated through the Djebel Mountain towards El Agheila; by this time the division had lost almost all its tanks. On 8 January 1942, the 32nd Tank Infantry Regiment was disbanded and in February 1942 the Ariete was reorganized and reinforced.

==== Battle of Gazala ====
On 26 May 1942 Axis forces went on the offensive again in the Battle of Gazala and on 27 May the Ariete overran the 3rd Indian Motor Brigade at Rugbet Al Atasc and captured 1,000 troops. On 29 May and 5 June 1942 the Ariete repelled British armored counterattacks. Axis forces then surged forward, took Tobruk, invaded Egypt and were stopped by British forces at El Alamein.

==== El Alamein ====
Only part of the Ariete had reached El Alamein on 3 July 1942 during the initial stage of the First Battle of El Alamein. The division's artillery was caught on the move by British forces engaged in a flanking attack and suffered heavy casualties in the ensuing clash. On 30 August 1942 the Ariete participated in the Battle of Alam el Halfa, but the Axis plan to outflank and encircle the British forces at El Alamein failed.

On 4 November 1942 during the Second Battle of El Alamein the Ariete was surrounded by advancing enemy forces and the division's commander General Francesco Antonio Arena broadcast the division's last message:

"Enemy tanks broke through south of Ariete Division. Thus, Ariete surrounded, located 5 kilometers north-west of Bir-el-Abd. Ariete tanks are fighting."

— Ariete Division's last radio message

Of the division's units only the XIII Tank Battalion M and about 200 Bersaglieri with six Semovente da 75/18 self-propelled guns escaped, but were overtaken and destroyed by British forces on the coastal road near Fuka on 5–6 November 1942. Rommel mourned the loss of the division, writing that its final action had been conducted with exemplary courage and that "in the Ariete we lost our oldest Italian comrades, from whom we had probably always demanded more than they, with their poor armament, had been capable of performing". The 132nd Armored Division "Ariete" was declared lost due to wartime events on 8 December 1942.

==== Tactical Group "Ariete" ====
On 21 November 1942, the Ariete's remaining personnel and the remnants of the 101st Motorized Division "Trieste" and 133rd Armored Division "Littorio" were organized as Tactical Group "Ariete", which kept fighting throughout the retreat, including a successful rearguard action at the Battle of El Agheila.

- Tactical Group "Ariete" (formed from the Division Command "Ariete")
  - 66th Infantry Regiment "Trieste" (from the 101st Motorized Division "Trieste")
    - 2x Fusilier battalions
  - 12th Bersaglieri Regiment (from the 133rd Armored Division "Littorio")
    - 2x Bersaglieri companies
  - Reconnaissance Group (remnants of the III Tank Group "Nizza Cavalleria")
  - CXXXII Armored Artillery Group (remnants of the Ariete's artillery units)
  - CXXXIII Armored Artillery Group (remnants of the Littorio's artillery units)

During the Tunisian Campaign the Tactical Group "Ariete" was reorganized as the 132nd Anti-tank Regiment, which joined the 131st Armored Division "Centauro". The last survivors of the Ariete surrendered with the rest of the Axis forces in North Africa on 13 May 1943.

=== 135th Armored Cavalry Division "Ariete" ===
On 1 April 1943, the Royal Italian Army activated the 135th Armored Cavalry Division "Ariete" in Ferrara, which continued the tradition of the 132nd Armored Division "Ariete". After the announcement of the Armistice of Cassibile on 8 September 1943 the division fought the invading German forces South of Rome. After two days the division was forced to surrender and was disbanded by the Germans on 12 September 1943.

=== Post War ===
On 23 May 1948 the Italian Army raised the Armored Brigade "Ariete" in Rome, which on 1 October 1952 was expanded to Armored Division "Ariete".

== Organization ==
=== Organization in Italy ===
132nd Armored Division "Ariete" organization in 1940.png

- 132nd Armored Division "Ariete", in Verona
  - Headquarters
    - Command Company
    - 70th Carabinieri Section
    - 132nd Field Post Office
    - 132nd Armored Division Command Transport Squad
  - 8th Bersaglieri Regiment, in Verona
    - Command Company
    - III Motorcyclists Battalion (reorganized as III Support Weapons Battalion in September 1941)
      - Command Company, 3 × Motorcyclists companies
    - V Auto-transported Battalion
      - Command Company, 2 × Bersaglieri companies
    - XII Auto-transported Battalion
      - Command Company, 2 × Bersaglieri companies
    - 8th Cannons Company (47/32 mod. 35 anti-tank guns)
    - Transport Unit
  - 32nd Tank Infantry Regiment, in Verona
    - Command Company
    - I Tank Battalion M (M11/39 tanks; transferred to the 4th Tank Infantry Regiment on 11 June 1940 )
    - II Tank Battalion M (M11/39 tanks; transferred to the 4th Tank Infantry Regiment on 11 June 1940 )
    - III Tank Battalion L (L3/35 tankettes)
    - IV Tank Battalion L (L3/35 tankettes)
    - I Tank Battalion L (L3/35 tankettes; transferred from the 1st Tank Infantry Regiment on 1 August 1940)
    - II Tank Battalion L (L3/35 tankettes; transferred from the 1st Tank Infantry Regiment on 1 August 1940)
    - III Tank Battalion M (M13/40 tanks; formed in September 1940; transferred the same month to Libya for the invasion of Egypt)
    - IV Tank Battalion M (M13/40 tanks; formed on 8 October 1940; transferred to the 31st Tank Infantry Regiment in January 1941)
    - V Tank Battalion M (M13/40 tanks; formed on 11 November 1940; transferred the same month to Libya for the invasion of Egypt)
  - 132nd Artillery Regiment "Ariete", in Rovereto
    - Command Unit
    - I Group (75/27 mod. 11 field guns)
    - II Group (75/27 mod. 11 field guns)
    - 2 × Anti-aircraft batteries (20/65 mod. 35 anti-aircraft guns)
    - Ammunition and Supply Unit
  - 132nd Anti-tank Company (47/32 mod. 35 anti-tank guns)
  - 142nd Anti-tank Company (47/32 mod. 35 anti-tank guns)
  - 132nd Mixed Engineer Company
  - 132nd Medical Section
  - 132nd Supply Section
  - 132nd Mixed Transport Unit

=== Organization in North Africa ===
132nd Armored Division "Ariete" organization in 1942

- 132nd Armored Division "Ariete"
  - Headquarters
    - Command Company
    - 70th Carabinieri Section
    - 132nd Field Post Office
    - 132nd Armored Division Command Transport Squad
  - 8th Bersaglieri Regiment
    - Command Company
    - III Support Weapons Battalion
      - Command Platoon, 1 × Machine Gun Company (Breda M37 heavy machine guns), 1 × Mortar Company (81mm mod. 35 mortars), 1 × Anti-aircraft Company (20/65 mod. 35 anti-aircraft guns)
    - V Auto-transported Battalion
      - Command Company, 2 × Bersaglieri companies, 1 × Anti-tank Company (47/32 mod. 35 anti-tank guns)
    - XII Auto-transported Battalion
      - Command Company, 2 × Bersaglieri companies, 1 × Anti-tank Company (47/32 mod. 35 anti-tank guns)
    - 8th Anti-tank Company (47/32 mod. 35 anti-tank guns; disbanded in September 1941)
    - 8th Motorcyclists Company (formed in September 1941)
    - Transport Unit
  - 32nd Tank Infantry Regiment (repatriated in January 1942)
    - Command Company
    - I Tank Battalion L (L3/35 tankettes; disbanded on 8 January 1942 and personnel transferred to the 132nd Tank Infantry Regiment)
    - II Tank Battalion L (L3/35 tankettes; arrived on 30 June 1941, disbanded on 8 January 1942 and personnel transferred to the 132nd Tank Infantry Regiment)
    - III Tank Battalion L (L3/35 tankettes; arrived on 30 June 1941, disbanded on 8 January 1942 and personnel transferred to the 132nd Tank Infantry Regiment)
    - VII Tank Battalion M (M13/40 tanks; arrived 4 March 1941, transferred on 1 September 1941 to the 132nd Tank Infantry Regiment)
    - VIII Tank Battalion M (M13/40 tanks; arrived on 22 June 1941 from the 4th Tank Infantry Regiment, transferred on 1 September 1941 to the 132nd Tank Infantry Regiment)
    - IX Tank Battalion M (M13/40 tanks; arrived on 21 July 1941 from the 3rd Tank Infantry Regiment, transferred on 1 September 1941 to the 132nd Tank Infantry Regiment)
    - Anti-aircraft Company (truck mounted 20/65 mod. 35 anti-aircraft guns)
  - 132nd Tank Infantry Regiment (activated on 1 September 1941)
    - Command Company
    - VII Tank Battalion M (M13/40 tanks; disbanded on 8 January 1942 and personnel transferred to VIII and IX tank battalions)
    - VIII Tank Battalion M (M13/40 tanks; disbanded in July 1942 and personnel transferred to IX Tank Battalion)
    - IX Tank Battalion M (M13/40 tanks)
    - X Tank Battalion M (M14/41 tanks; arrived on 27 January 1942 from the 133rd Tank Infantry Regiment)
    - XIII Tank Battalion M (M14/41 tanks; arrived in August 1942 from the 31st Tank Infantry Regiment)
    - Anti-aircraft Company (truck mounted 20/65 mod. 35 anti-aircraft guns)
  - 132nd Artillery Regiment "Ariete"
    - Command Unit
    - I Group (75/27 mod. 06 field guns)
    - II Group (75/27 mod. 06 field guns)
    - III Group (105/28 cannons)
    - IV Mixed Anti-aircraft Group (formed in February 1942; later renumbered DI Anti-aircraft Group)
      - 2 × Anti-aircraft/Anti-tank batteries (90/53 anti-aircraft guns mounted on Lancia 3Ro trucks)
      - 2 × Anti-aircraft batteries (20/65 mod. 35 anti-aircraft guns)
    - V Self-propelled Group (Semovente da 75/18 self-propelled guns; joined the regiment in February 1942; later renumbered DLI Self-propelled Group)
    - VI Self-propelled Group (Semovente da 75/18 self-propelled guns; joined the regiment in February 1942; later renumbered DLII Self-propelled Group)
    - XXXI Anti-aircraft Group (8.8 cm Flak anti-aircraft guns; attached to the regiment from February 1942)
    - CCCXXXII Group (100/17 mod. 14 howitzers; attached to the regiment from February 1942)
  - II Anti-tank Battalion (formed in September 1941 and disbanded in February 1942)
    - 132nd Anti-tank Company (47/32 mod. 35 anti-tank guns; autonomous unit until September 1941)
    - 142nd Anti-tank Company (47/32 mod. 35 anti-tank guns; autonomous unit until September 1941)
  - III Tank Group "Nizza Cavalleria" (L6/40 tanks light tanks, armored reconnaissance, arrived in September 1941)
  - XXXII Mixed Engineer Battalion (formed on 11 August 1941)
    - 132nd Engineer Company
    - 232nd Connections Company
  - 132nd Medical Section
  - 132nd Supply Section
  - 132nd Mixed Transport Unit (replaced by the 42nd Mixed Transport Unit in September 1941; which in turn was replaced by the 82nd Mixed Transport Unit in February 1942)

Attached to the division from February to July 1942:

- IV Anti-tank Battalion "Granatieri di Sardegna" (47/32 mod. 35 anti-tank guns)

== Military honours ==
For their conduct during the Western Desert campaign the President of Italy awarded the units of the 132nd Armored Division "Ariete" Italy's highest military honour, the Gold Medal of Military Valor. The 8th Bersaglieri Regiment, which was the only remaining unit of the division after the Second Battle of El Alamein was awarded a second Gold Medal of Military Valour for its service during the Tunisian campaign.

For the units' conduct during the Western Desert campaign:

- 8th Bersaglieri Regiment on 31 December 1947
- III Tank Battalion "M/13"/ 32nd Tank Infantry Regiment on 12 October 1953
- 132nd Tank Infantry Regiment on 31 December 1947
- 132nd Artillery Regiment on 15 March 1950

For the regiment's conduct during the Tunisian campaign:

- 8th Bersaglieri Regiment on 28 July 1950

== Commanding officers ==
The division's commanding officers were:

- Generale di Divisione Carlo Vecchiarelli (1 February 1939 - 14 November 1939)
- Generale di Divisione Ettore Baldassarre (15 November 1939 - 10 July 1940)
- Generale di Brigata Ismaele di Nisio (acting, 11–21 July 1941)
- Generale di Divisione Mario Balotta (22 July 1941 - 19 January 1942)
- Generale di Divisione Giuseppe De Stefanis (20 January 1942 - 27 June 1942)
- Generale di Brigata Francesco Antonio Arena (acting, 28 June - 25 July 1942)
- Generale di Divisione Adolfo Infante (26 July 1942 - 16 September 1942)
- Generale di Divisione Francesco Antonio Arena (17 September 1942 - 8 December 1942)

== Bibliography ==
- Walker, Ian W. (2006). Iron Hulls, Iron Hearts; Mussolini's Elite Armored Divisions in North Africa. Crowood. ISBN 1-86126-646-4.
- Paoletti, Ciro (2008). A Military History of Italy. Greenwood Publishing Group. ISBN 978-0-275-98505-9.
