= Carlo Vecchiarelli =

Italian general

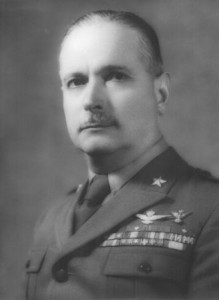
A portrait of Carlo Vecchiarelli

Carlo Vecchiarelli (10 January 1884 – 13 December 1948) was an Italian general. He was a veteran combatant of the First World War. Between the two world wars he held the positions of Military Attaché at the Italian Embassy in Prague, Honorary Field Assistant to King Vittorio Emanuele III, Military Attaché at the Italian Embassy in Vienna, commander of the 7th Alpini Regiment, of the I Alpini Brigade, of the 47th Infantry Division "Bari", of the 132nd Armored Division "Ariete", and of the V Army Corps of Trieste. During the Second World War he was commander of the I and XX Army Corps, and of the 11th Army stationed in Greece, with headquarters in Athens. After the proclamation of the Armistice of Cassibile of 8 September 1943, after receiving ambiguous instructions from the Supreme Command, on the morning of 9 September 1943 he gave the order to surrender all heavy weapons to the Germans, in exchange for the latter's commitment to repatriate the Army. The Germans, however, soon betrayed the agreement and had the troops of the Eleventh Army sent to Germany as Italian military internees. Vecchiarelli himself was arrested and imprisoned in Poland before being handed over to the Italian Social Republic, which sentenced him to ten years' imprisonment for "anti-German behaviour in Greece". He was released by the partisans at the end of the war.

== Sources ==
- Bregantin, Lisa (2010). L'occupazione dimenticata. Gli italiani in Grecia 1941-1943 [The Forgotten Occupation. The Italians in Greece 1941–1943] (PhD thesis) (in Italian). Università Ca’ Foscari di Venezia. Archived from the original on 2019-01-17.
