= XX Army Corps (Italy) =

Corps of the Royal Italian Army during World War II

The XX Army Corps was a corps of the Royal Italian Army during World War II. The XX Corps took part in the Western Desert Campaign from summer 1941 to 1943.
Between 10 September 1941 and 10 March 1942 the unit was named Maneuver Army Corps (Italian: Corpo d'Armata di Manovra).

Western Desert campaign, 1940–1943

== Order of Battle at El Alamein ==
- Commander Lieutenant General Giuseppe De Stefanis
  - VIII Army Artillery Group (part)
  - 90th Engineer Company
  - 132nd Armored Division "Ariete", Major General Francesco Antonio Arena
    - 132nd Tank Infantry Regiment
    - 8th Bersaglieri Regiment (motorized)
    - 132nd Artillery Regiment (motorized)
    - Squadrons Group/ Regiment "Nizza Cavalleria" (1st)
    - XXXII Mixed Engineer Battalion (motorized)
  - 133rd Armored Division "Littorio", Major General Gervasio Bitossi
    - 133rd Tank Infantry Regiment
    - 12th Bersaglieri Regiment (motorized)
    - 3rd Artillery Regiment
    - 133rd Artillery Regiment (part)
    - III Squadrons Group/ Regiment "Lancieri di Novara" (5th)
  - 101st Motorized Division "Trieste", Brigadier General Francesco La Ferla
    - 65th Infantry Regiment
    - 66th Infantry Regiment
    - 21st Artillery Regiment
    - VIII Armored Bersaglieri Battalion
    - XI Tank Battalion
    - LII Mixed Artillery Group

== Commanders ==
- Generale di CA spe Ferdinando Cona (22 January 1939 – 6 February 1941)
- Generale di D fuori quadro Enrico Armando (Commander of Fortress Tripoli)
- Generale di D spe Carlo Spatocco (16 March – 15 August 1941)
  - Generale di CA spe Carlo Vecchiarelli (15 August 1941 – 19 January 1942) : Commander of Fortress Tripoli
  - Generale di CA spe Gastone Gambara (15 August – 31 December 1941) : Corpo d'Armata di Manovra
- Generale di CA spe Francesco Zingales (19 January – 20 March 1942)
- Generale di D spe Ettore Baldassarre (21 March – 26 June 1942) (KIA)
- Generale di D spe Giuseppe De Stefanis (27 June – 29 November 1942)
- Generale di D spe Gervasio Bitossi (29 November 1942 – 18 February 1943)
- Generale di CA spe Taddeo Orlando (18 February – 13 May 1943) (POW)
