= Ettore Baldassarre =

Italian general during World War II

Ettore Baldassarse
- Born: 27 April 1883; Trani, Kingdom of Italy
- Died: 26 June 1942 (aged 59); Mersa Matruh, Kingdom of Egypt
- Military career
- Allegiance: Kingdom of Italy
- Branch: Royal Italian Army
- Rank: Lieutenant general
- Commands: Artillery Balloon Service; 6th Field Artillery; 58th Infantry Division Legnano; 132nd Armoured Division Ariete; XX Motorized Corps
- Conflicts: Italo-Turkish War; World War I; Battles of the Isonzo; Battle of Asiago; Battle of the Piave; Battle of Vittorio Veneto; World War II; Operation Sonnenblume; Battle of Gazala; Battle of Bir Hakeim; Axis capture of Tobruk; Battle of Mersa Matruh †
- Awards: Gold Medal of Military Valour (posthumous); Bronze Medal of Military Valour; Military Order of Savoy

Ettore Baldassarre (27 April 1883 – 26 June 1942) was an Italian general during World War II.

== Biography ==
Baldassarre was born in Trani, Apulia, on April 27, 1883, the son of Michele Baldassarre and Amalia Manganaro. In his youth he moved with his family to Messina, where he obtained his high school license. After enlisting in the Royal Italian Army, he enrolled in the Royal Military Academy of Artillery and Engineers in Turin, graduating as an artillery second lieutenant in 1903. After promotion to lieutenant in 1905, he was assigned to the 3rd Fortress Artillery Regiment, subsequently attending the Application School in Turin, obtaining the highest score achieved until then in the final exam. From October 1911 he served in Libya during the Italo-Turkish War, returning to Italy in October 1912, having been promoted to captain and decorated with a Bronze Medal of Military Valour.

In November 1914 he was placed in command of the balloon service of the artillery branch, distinguishing himself during the First World War during the battles on the Isonzo, on the Karst Plateau and on the Asiago plateau. After promotion to major he became commander of a group of heavy field artillery, and at the end of the war he was artillery commander of the Third Army, promoted to lieutenant colonel for exceptional merits.

In 1920 he was assigned to the Artillery Inspectorate, carrying out numerous studies on the firing of artillery pieces, which converged in the compilation of the Artillery Instructions, for which he was promoted to colonel for exceptional merits. Between 1931 and 1933 he was commander of the 6th Field Artillery Regiment, and then General Commissioner for War Productions. On January 1, 1935, he was promoted to brigadier general and given command of the artillery of the Milan Army Corps. On 30 June 1938 he was promoted to major general, becoming commander of the 58th Infantry Division Legnano in place of the Duke of Bergamo.

In November 1939 Baldassarre was given command of the 132nd Armoured Division Ariete, which he still held at the time of Italy's entrance into World War II, on June 10, 1940. In the spring of 1941, following the destruction of the Tenth Army in Operation Compass, the division was transferred to North Africa and participated in the reconquest of Cyrenaica alongside the Afrika Korps, for which Baldassarre was awarded the Officer's Cross of the Military Order of Savoy. He returned to Italy in July 1941 to become Senior Director of the Army Technical Service, a position he left in March 1942, when he returned to North Africa and was appointed commander of the XX Motorized Corps, replacing General Francesco Zingales. He led the Corps during the battles of Gazala and Bir Hakeim.

On 26 June 1942, during an inspection of the frontline near Mersa Matruh, the staff car in which he was travelling along with General Guido Piacenza, artillery commander of the XX Corps, Colonel Vittorio Raffaelli, engineer commander of the XX Corps, and Major Aldo Erculiani, was bombed and strafed by Hawker Hurricane fighter planes. Piacenza, Raffaelli and Erculiani were killed in the attack, and the mortally wounded Baldassarre was carried to the nearby field hospital of the "Ariete" Division. After summoning General Giuseppe De Stefanis to his bedside and handing him over the command of the XX Corps, Baldassarre died of his wounds at 14:00 on 26 June. According to historian Ian Walker, "the loss of these three important officers" [Baldassarre, Piacenza and Raffaelli] was a major blow to the Italians, particularly that of Baldassarre, who had led them successfully through the battles of May and June"; according to Samuel Mitcham, Baldassarre "was one of the few Italian generals whom Rommel truly respected. He called him a 'brave and efficient commander', and genuinely mourned his death".
