= 3rd Targeting Support Regiment "Bondone" =

Active Italian Army unmanned aerial vehicles unit

- 3° Reggimento Supporto Targeting "Bondone"
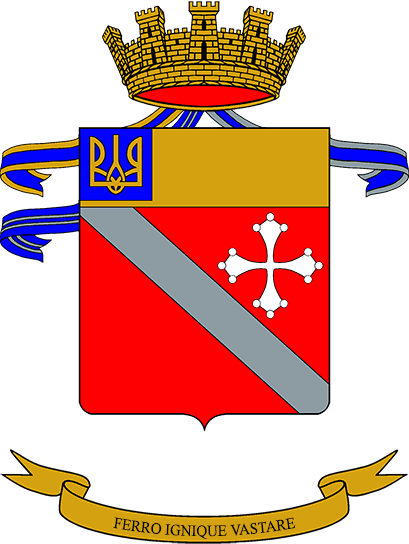
- Regimental coat of arms
- Active: 1 Aug. 1920 – 8 Sept. 1943; 15 Aug. 1949 – 1 Nov. 1955; 31 July 1961 – 4 Sept. 1992; 13 Nov. 2023 – today
- Country: Italy
- Branch: Italian Army
- Part of: Artillery Command
- Garrison/HQ: Cassino
- Motto: "Ferro ignique vastare"
- Anniversaries: 15 June 1918 – Second Battle of the Piave River
- Decorations: 1× Gold Medal of Military Valor; 1× Silver Medal of Military Valor; 1× War Cross of Military Valor

Insignia
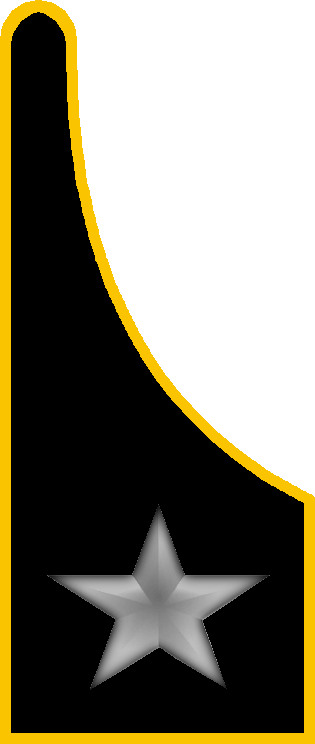
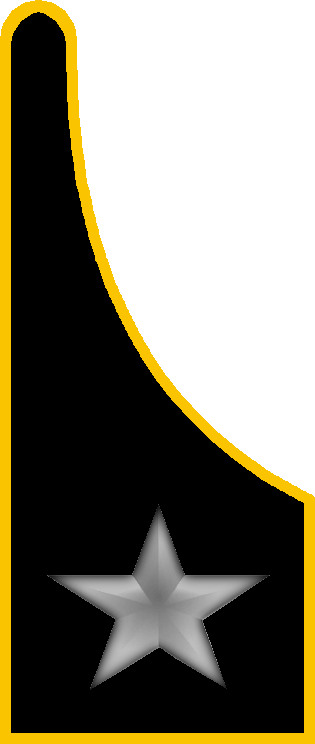
- Regimental gorget patches

The 3rd Targeting Support Regiment "Bondone" (Italian: 3° Reggimento Supporto Targeting "Bondone") is an artillery regiment of the Italian Army, which is equipped with unmanned aerial vehicles. The regiment is based in Cassino in Lazio and assigned to the army's Artillery Command. The regiment was formed in 1920 by the Royal Italian Army with pre-existing groups, that had fought in World War I on the Italian front and Western front. In World War II the regiment formed two artillery groupings, one of which was assigned to the Italian Expeditionary Corps in Russia and distinguished itself on the Eastern front. The regiment and its groupings were disbanded by invading German forces after the announcement of the Armistice of Cassibile on 8 September 1943.

The regiment was reformed in 1949 as 3rd Heavy Field Artillery Regiment and served as a support unit for the V Territorial Military Command. In 1955 the regiment was transformed into the 3rd Heavy Artillery Regiment and the flag of the 3rd Heavy Field Artillery Regiment was transferred to the Shrine of the Flags in the Vittoriano in Rome. In 1961 the 3rd Heavy Field Artillery Regiment was reformed again with the personnel and materiel of the 3rd Anti-aircraft Artillery Regiment. The regiment was disbanded in 1975 and its flag and traditions were transferred to the 4th Artillery Specialists Group "Bondone", which in 1986 was renumbered 3rd Artillery Specialists Group "Bondone". In 1992 the group was disbanded and the flag of the 3rd Heavy Field Artillery Regiment was once more transferred to the Shrine of the Flags in the Vittoriano. On 13 November 2023 the regiment was reformed as 3rd Targeting Support Regiment "Bondone" in Cassino with the personnel of the 80th Regiment "Roma".

The regimental anniversary falls, as for all Italian Army artillery regiments, on June 15, the beginning of the Second Battle of the Piave River in 1918. This article is about the Royal Italian Army's 3rd Heavy Field Artillery Regiment, which was a support unit assigned to a corps-level command. This regiment is unrelated to the 3rd Heavy Artillery Regiment, which was a support unit assigned to an army-level command, and unrelated to the 3rd Field Artillery Regiment, which was a support unit assigned to a division-level command.

== History ==
On 1 August 1920 the 4th Heavy Field Artillery Regiment was formed in Cremona. The regiment consisted of four groups, which had fought in World War I on the Italian front and then on the Western front. The regiment's command, I Cannons Group, and II Cannons Group, were formed by the command, and the II and III groups of the disbanded 4th Field Artillery Regiment. The new regiment's III Cannons Group was the former XLIV Cannons Group, which had been formed by the depot of the 3rd Field Artillery Regiment, while the new regiment's IV Howitzers Group was the former XXXIII Howitzers Group, which had been formed by the depot of the 6th Field Artillery Regiment. The latter two groups had been assigned during the war to the 9th Heavy Field Artillery Grouping. The new regiment's I, II, and III Group were equipped with 105/28 cannons, while the IV Group was equipped with 149/12 howitzers.

=== World War I ===
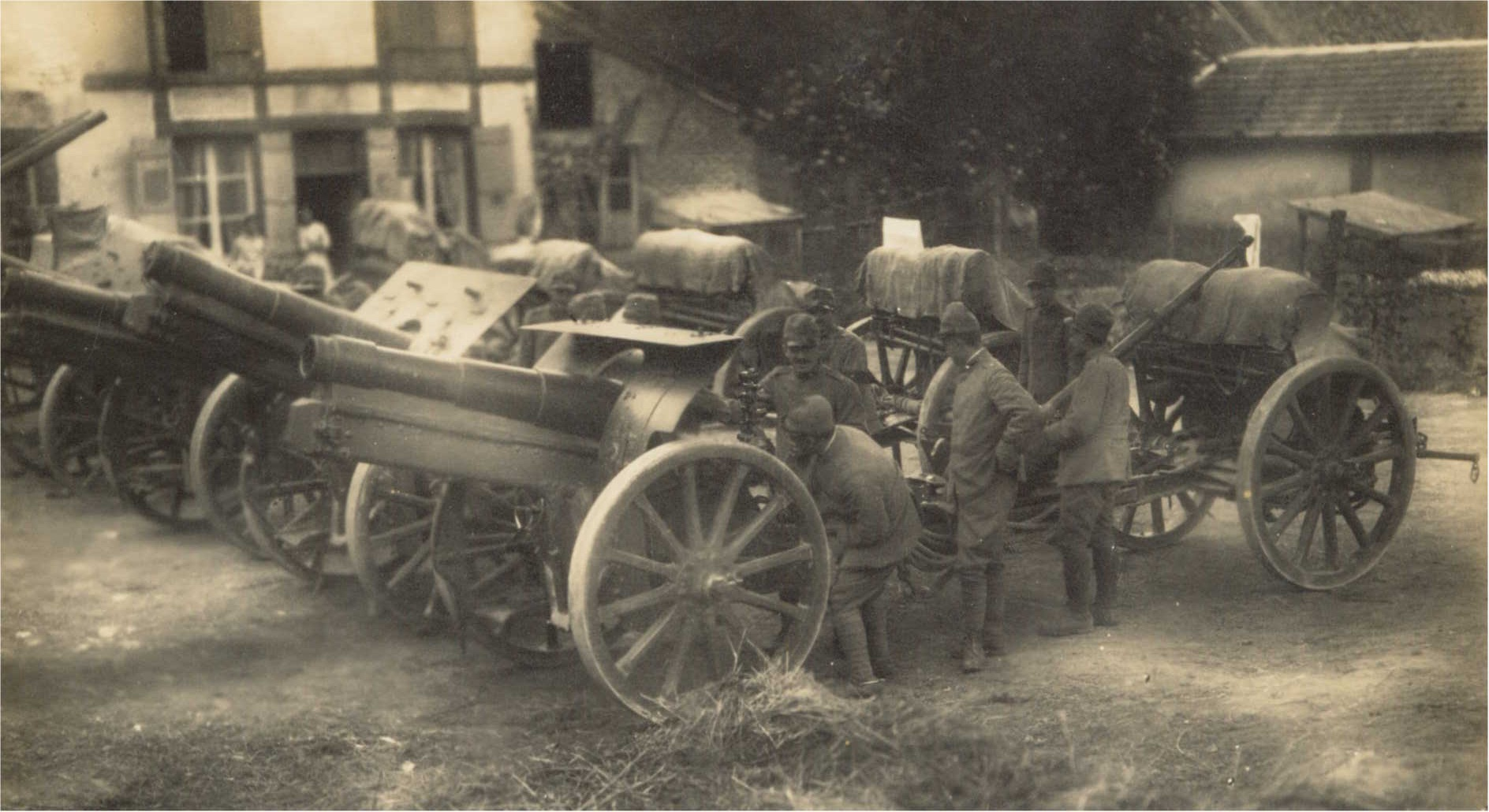
XVIII Heavy Field Howitzers Group with 149/12 howitzers in France 1918

The 4th Field Artillery Regiment had fought in 1915 at Tolmin for control of the hills of Bučenica and Mengore. Later in 1915 the regiment fought on the flanks of Veliki Vrh, on Monte Jelenik, at Bovec, on Mrzli Vrh, on Mount Krn, and on Monte Vodil. In 1916 the regiment was once more in the area of Santa Maria and Santa Lucia, before moving to Monte Kukla and returning to Veliki Vrh. In 1917 the regiment was deployed on the Monte Vodil until the Battle of Caporetto, after which the regiment retreated to the Piave river. In 1918 the regiment was assigned, together with the Brigade "Brescia" and the Brigade "Alpi" to the 8th Division, which was sent in April 1918 to the Western front. There the division fought in the Third Battle of the Aisne, Second Battle of the Marne, Battle of Saint-Thierry, and the Hundred Days Offensive.

=== Interwar years ===
On 1 November 1926 the 4th Heavy Field Artillery Regiment and 3rd Heavy Field Artillery Regiment switched numbers. The new 3rd Heavy Field Artillery Regiment consisted a command, a command unit, the I and II groups with 105/28 cannons, and the III and IV groups was equipped with 149/13 heavy howitzers. On 1 October 1934 the regiment was renamed 3rd Army Corps Artillery Regiment. On 1 March 1935 the regiment transferred its II Group with 105/28 cannons to the 3rd Fast Artillery Regiment "Principe Amedeo Duca d'Aosta" and subsequently formed a new II Group with 105/28 cannons on 6 June of the same year. A month later the regiment formed the V Group with 105/28 cannons and the VI Group with 149/13 heavy howitzers. In 1936 the regiment disbanded the II, V, and VI groups. In 1937 the regiment disbanded the IV Group and in August of the same year the II Group, which had been transferred in 1935 to the 3rd Fast Artillery Regiment "Principe Amedeo Duca d'Aosta", returned to the regiment. On 20 April 1939 the regiment's depot in Cremona formed the 131st Armored Artillery Regiment for the 131st Armored Division "Centauro" and on 18 September of the same year the depot formed the 133rd Armored Artillery Regiment for the 133rd Armored Division "Littorio".

=== World War II ===
At the outbreak of World War II the regiment consisted of a command and four groups. During the war the regiment's depot in Cremona formed and mobilized the following unit commands:

- 3rd Army Corps Artillery Grouping
- 30th Army Corps Artillery Grouping
- 42nd Army Corps Artillery Grouping, transferred in July 1942 to the 2nd Army Corps Artillery Regiment
- VII Cannons Group with 105/28 cannons
- VIII Cannons Group with 105/28 cannons
- XXIX Cannons Group with 105/28 cannons
- XLIII Cannons Group with 105/28 cannons
- LX Cannons Group with 105/32 heavy field guns
- CVII Howitzers Group with 149/13 heavy howitzers
- CVIII Howitzers Group with 149/13 heavy howitzers
- CXLIII Howitzers Group with 149/12 howitzers
- XIII Replacements Group with 149/13 heavy howitzers
- 3rd Army Corps Specialists Unit

The regiment's depot also formed and mobilized the batteries for the group commands. The groups operated either under command of army corps artillery groupings or as autonomous units. The depot was disbanded by invading German forces after the announcement of the Armistice of Cassibile on 8 September 1943.

- 3rd Army Corps Artillery Grouping: the grouping was mobilized at the beginning of World War II and by 10 June 1940, the day Italy entered the war, it consisted of a command, a command unit, the VII and VIII cannons groups with 105/28 cannons, the CVII and CVIII howitzers groups with 149/13 heavy howitzers, and the 3rd Army Corps Specialists Unit. The grouping participated in June 1940 in the invasion of France and from October 1940 to April 1941 the grouping fought in the Greco-Italian War. After the Battle of Greece the grouping was stationed in occupied Greece until it was disbanded by German forces after the announcement of the Armistice of Cassibile on 8 September 1943. At the time of the armistice announcement the grouping's VII Cannons Group was attached to the 33rd Infantry Division "Acqui" on Cephalonia and suffered the same fate as the division, which was massacred by German troops after having surrendered. After the war the commanding officer of the VII Cannons Group, Major Armando Pica, and the commanding officer of the group's Ammunition and Supply Unit, Captain Antonio Valgoi, were awarded in memoriam Italy's highest military honor, the Gold Medal of Military Valor, for their, ultimately futile, attempts to trade their lives for the lives of their men.
- 30th Army Corps Artillery Grouping: the grouping was formed on 10 May 1940 and consisted of a command, a command unit, the LX Cannons Group with 105/32 heavy field guns, the LXI Cannons Group with 105/32 heavy field guns, which had been mobilized by the 4th Army Corps Artillery Regiment, and the LXII Cannons Group with 105/32 heavy field guns, which had been mobilized by the 6th Army Corps Artillery Regiment. In this configuration the grouping participated in the invasion of France. In July 1941 the grouping was assigned to the Italian Expeditionary Corps in Russia, which by 10 August was in combat against Soviet forces in Ukraine. In September 1941 the corps participated in the Battle of Kyiv, capturing and holding a bridgehead on the eastern side of the Dnipro river. In October 1941 the corps played a significant role in the capture of Stalino and in November the division captured Horlivka. In winter 1941 the corps was engaged in defensive operations. In spring 1942 the Italian Expeditionary Corps was redesignated as XXXV Army Corps and assigned to the Italian 8th Army. At the time the grouping received the CXXIV Howitzers Group with 149/13 heavy howitzers, which had been mobilized by the 2nd Army Corps Artillery Regiment, as reinforcements. In summer 1942 the 8th Army participated in Case Blue — the German offensive towards Stalingrad and the Caucasus. At the time the 30th Army Corps Artillery Grouping consisted of the following units:

- 30th Army Corps Artillery Grouping
  - LX Group
    - 3× Batteries — 4× 105/32 heavy field guns per battery
  - LXI Group
    - 3× Batteries — 4× 105/32 heavy field guns per battery
  - LXII Group
    - 3× Batteries — 4× 105/32 heavy field guns per battery
  - CXXIV Group
    - 3× Batteries — 4× 149/13 heavy howitzers per battery
  - 30th Army Corps Specialists Unit
  - 95th Anti-aircraft Battery — 8× 20/65 mod. 35 anti-aircraft guns
  - 97th Anti-aircraft Battery — 8× 20/65 mod. 35 anti-aircraft guns

In August 1942 the XXXV Army Corps reached the Don river, where it remained until 11 December 1942, when the Soviets commenced Operation Little Saturn. By 16 December 1942 the collapse of the entire Italian front-line was underway and the heavily decimated Italian units began their retreat. On 3 January 1943 the remnants of the grouping reached Axis lines. Only two officers and 50 soldiers of the grouping had survived the retreat. In March 1943 the few survivors were repatriated.

For its conduct and bravery during the summer campaign 1941 the 30th Army Corps Artillery Grouping was awarded a War Cross of Military Valor and for its conduct and bravery during the summer campaign 1942 the 30th Army Corps Artillery Grouping was awarded a Silver Medal of Military Valor. For its bravery and sacrifice during Operation Little Saturn the grouping was awarded Italy's highest military honor, a Gold Medal of Military Valor. After the war the traditions of the grouping were assigned to the 3rd Heavy Field Artillery Regiment, which received the two medals and the cross and affixed them to the regiment's flag. The three decorations are also depicted on the regiment's coat of arms.

=== Cold War ===
On 15 August 1949 the 3rd Heavy Field Artillery Regiment was reformed in Padua. The regiment was assigned to the V Territorial Military Command and consisted of a command, a command unit, the XI Group with 149/19 heavy howitzers, and the XXI Group with 140/30 guns. Both groups had been formed in 1948 by the Artillery Recruits Advanced Training Center in Civitavecchia. Upon entering the regiment the XI Group was renumbered I Group, while the XXI Group was renumbered II Group. In 1952 the regiment moved from Padua to Vicenza. On 1 March 1953 the regiment formed the III Group with 140/30 guns. On 1 November 1955 the regiment was transformed into the 3rd Heavy Artillery Regiment and the flag of the 3rd Heavy Field Artillery Regiment was transferred to the Shrine of the Flags in the Vittoriano in Rome.

On 1 September 1961 the 3rd Heavy Anti-aircraft Artillery Regiment in Pisa was transformed into the 3rd Heavy Field Artillery Regiment. The regiment was assigned to the VII Territorial Military Command in Florence and consisted of a command, a command unit, the I Group with M114 155mm howitzers, the II Group with QF 25-pounder field guns, and the III Group with 90/50 M1 anti-aircraft guns. On 29 November 1963 the regiment transferred the II Group with QF 25-pounder field guns to the 14th Field Artillery Regiment. During the same year the regiment disbanded its III Group 90/50 M1 anti-aircraft guns. By the end of 1963 the regiment consisted of the following units:

- 3rd Heavy Field Artillery Regiment, in Pisa
  - Command Unit, in Pisa
  - I Group with M114 155mm howitzers, in Lucca
  - II Group with M114 155mm howitzers, in Pisa
  - III Group with M114 155mm howitzers, in Lucca
  - IV Group with M114 155mm howitzers, in Pisa

In 1973 the III Group was put in reserve status, followed by the IV Group in 1974. On 30 September 1975 the 3rd Heavy Field Artillery Regiment was disbanded and the regiment's flag and traditions were assigned the next day to the 4th Artillery Specialists Group "Bondone" in Trento.

The group was formed in Trento on 1 March 1956 by the 9th Heavy Artillery Regiment as IV Army Corps Artillery Specialists Unit. On 1 March 1958 the unit became autonomous and was assigned as IV Army Corps Artillery Specialists Group to the IV Army Corps. On 1 June of the same year the group consisted of a command, a command unit, and three target acquisition batteries.

During the 1975 army reform the army disbanded the regimental level and newly independent battalions and groups were granted for the first time their own flags. On 30 September 1975 the IV Army Corps Artillery Specialists Group was renamed 4th Artillery Specialists Group "Bondone". The group was named for the Monte Bondone, which towers over the city of Trento. The group consisted of a command, a command and services battery, and a specialists battery, which provided weather-ballistic data to the mountain artillery groups of the alpine brigades "Cadore", "Julia", "Orobica", "Taurinense", and "Tridentina", and to the groups of the 4th Heavy Field Artillery Regiment. At the time the group fielded 290 men (15 officers, 36 non-commissioned officers, and 239 soldiers).

With the reform the 4th Artillery Specialists Group "Bondone" became an alpine troops unit and the group's troops replaced their artillery berets with the alpine troops' Cappello Alpino, and their artillery gorget patches with mountain artillery gorget patches. On 12 November 1976 the President of the Italian Republic Giovanni Leone issued decree 846, which assigned the flag and traditions of the 3rd Heavy Field Artillery Regiment to the 4th Artillery Specialists Group "Bondone".

On 1 November 1986 the group was renumbered 3rd Artillery Specialists Group "Bondone". On 4 September 1992 the group was disbanded and on 30 September of the same year the flag of the 3rd Heavy Field Artillery Regiment was transferred to the Shrine of the Flags in the Vittoriano in Rome.

== Recent times ==
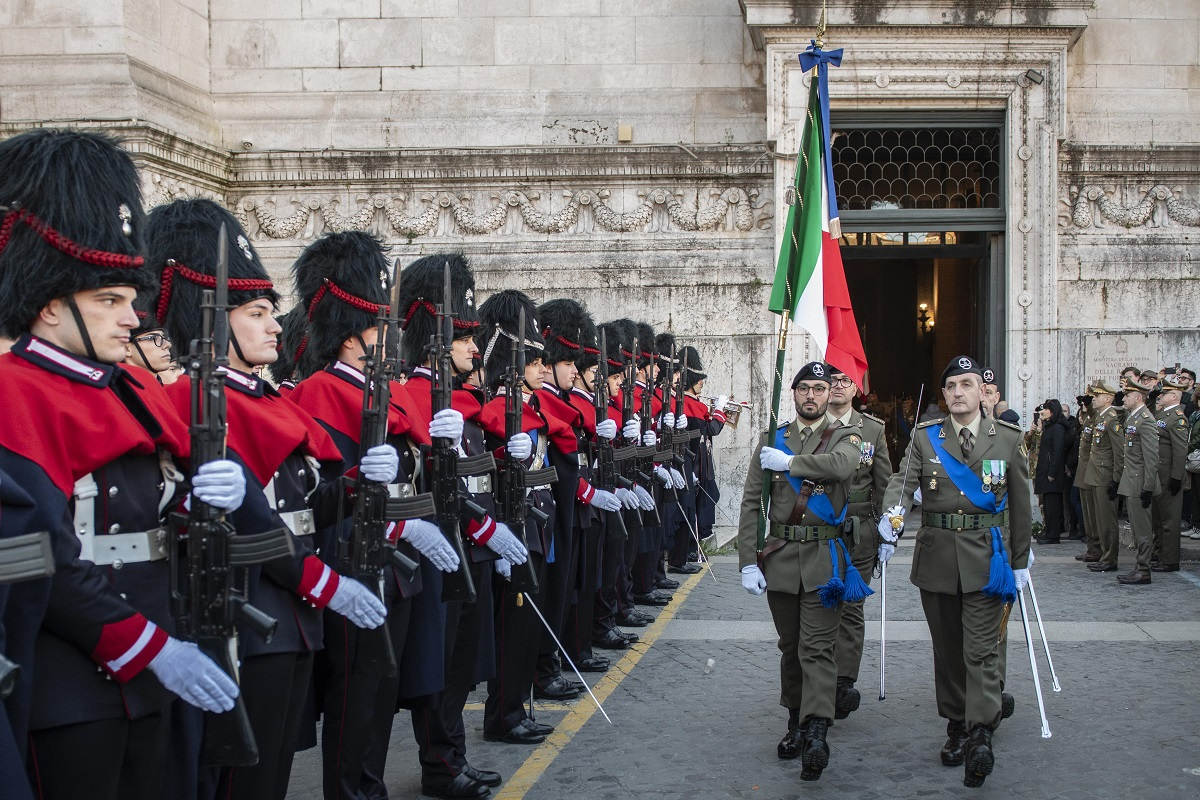
The flag of the 3rd Targeting Support Regiment "Bondone" is retrieved from the Shrine of the Flags in the Vittoriano in Rome

On 13 November 2023 the regiment was reformed as 3rd Targeting Support Regiment "Bondone" in Cassino with the personnel of the 80th Regiment "Roma". The regiment was assigned to the army's Artillery Command and is equipped with unmanned aerial vehicles.

== Organization ==
As of January 2024 the 3rd Targeting Support Regiment "Bondone" is still forming and is organized therefore currently as follows:

- 3rd Targeting Support Regiment "Bondone", in Cassino
  - Multisensor Company
