= 2nd Heavy Field Artillery Regiment (Italy) =

Inactive Italian Army artillery unit

- 2° Reggimento Artiglieria Pesante Campale
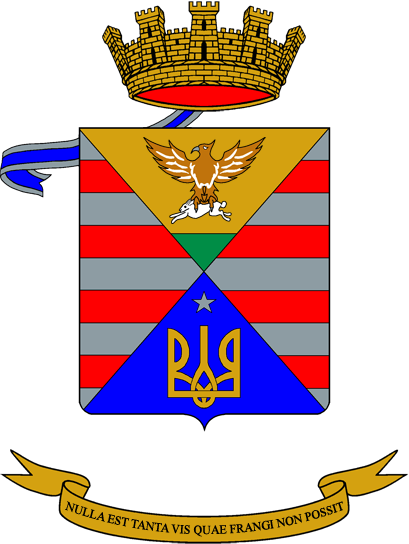
- Regimental coat of arms
- Active: 7 July 1920 — 8 Sept. 1943; 1 Oct. 1976 — 6 Dec. 1981; 1 March 1986 — 10 Oct. 1995
- Country: Italy
- Branch: Italian Army
- Part of: Mechanized Brigade "Pinerolo"
- Garrison/HQ: Barletta
- Motto(s): "Nulla est tanta vis quae frangi non possit"
- Anniversaries: 15 June 1918 - Second Battle of the Piave River
- Decorations: 1x Silver Medal of Military Valor

Insignia
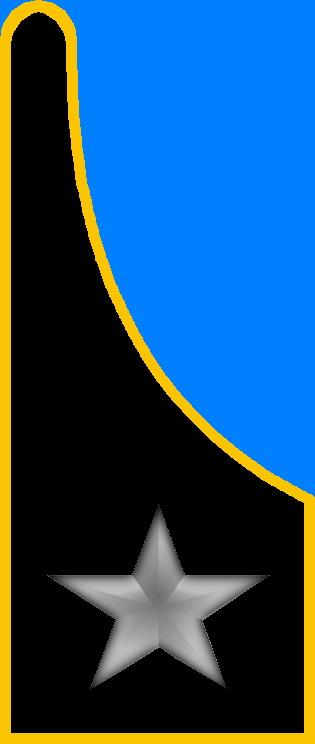
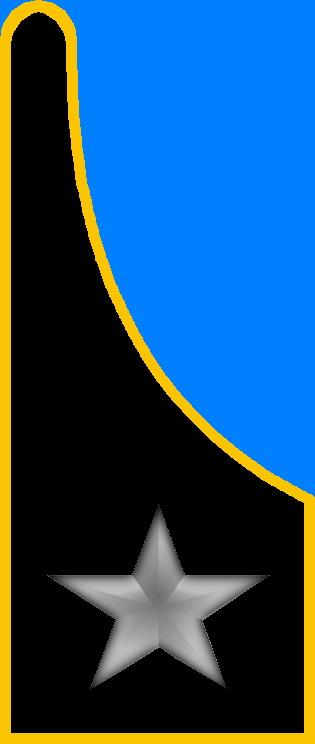
- Regimental gorget patches

The 2nd Heavy Field Artillery Regiment (Italian: 2° Reggimento Artiglieria Pesante Campale) is an inactive artillery regiment of the Italian Army, which was based in Barletta in Apulia and assigned to the Mechanized Brigade "Pinerolo". Originally an artillery regiment of the Royal Italian Army, the regiment was formed in 1920 with pre-existing groups, which had fought during World War I on the Italian front. During World War II the regiment formed two army corps artillery groupings, one of which participated in 1940 in the invasion of France and in 1942-43 served with the Italian 8th Army on the Eastern Front. The other grouping fought in 1941 in the Greco-Italian War and served in 1942 in the occupation of Vichy France. The regiment and its groupings were disbanded by invading German forces after the announcement of the Armistice of Cassibile on 8 September 1943.

In 1976 the 2nd Heavy Field Artillery Group "Potenza" was formed and assigned the flag and traditions of the 2nd Heavy Field Artillery Regiment. The group was assigned to the Artillery Command of the Southern Military Region until 1981, when it was incorporated by the 9th Heavy Field Artillery Regiment as 2nd Group. When that regiment was disbanded in 1986 the group became autonomous again as 2nd Heavy Field Artillery Group "Potenza". In 1991 the group was assigned to the Mechanized Brigade "Pinerolo" and renamed 2nd Field Artillery Group "Potenza". In 1993 the group entered the reformed 2nd Self-propelled Field Artillery Regiment "Potenza". In 1995 the regiment was disbanded and its flag transferred to the Shrine of the Flags in the Vittoriano in Rome. The regiment's personnel, materiel, and base in Barletta, were taken over by the 131st Self-propelled Field Artillery Regiment "Centauro".

The regimental anniversary falls, as for all Italian Army artillery regiments, on June 15, the beginning of the Second Battle of the Piave River in 1918. This article is about the Royal Italian Army's 2nd Heavy Field Artillery Regiment, which was a support unit assigned to a corps-level command. This regiment is unrelated to the 2nd Heavy Artillery Regiment, which was a support unit assigned to an army-level command, and unrelated to the 2nd Field Artillery Regiment, which was a support unit assigned to a division-level command.

== History ==
On 7 July 1920 the 6th Heavy Field Artillery Regiment was formed in Vicenza. The new regiment's command was formed with the personnel of the disbanded 39th Heavy Field Artillery Regiment, which had been formed on 2 February 1920, and the personnel of the 8th Heavy Field Artillery Grouping, which had been formed for service World War I. The regiment consisted of four groups, which had fought in World War I on the Italian front: the I and II cannons groups were the former XXVI and XXVII cannons groups, which had both been formed during the war by the depot of the 2nd Heavy Field Artillery Regiment. The new regiment's III and IV howitzers groups were the former XIV Howitzers Group, which had been formed by the depot of the 1st Field Artillery Regiment, and the former XX Howitzers Group, which had been formed by the depot of the 5th Field Artillery Regiment. The new regiment's I and II groups were equipped with 105/28 cannons, while the III and IV groups were equipped with 149/12 howitzers. On 1 September 1920 the regiment moved from Vicenza to Genoa. On 1 November 1926 the 6th Heavy Field Artillery Regiment and 2nd Heavy Field Artillery Regiment switched numbers.

In 1930 the regiment moved from Genoa to Acqui. On 1 October 1934 the regiment was renamed 2nd Army Corps Artillery Regiment. In 1935 the regiment provided four officers and 117 enlisted to augment units deployed for the Second Italo-Ethiopian War.

=== World War II ===
At the outbreak of World War II the regiment consisted of a command and four groups. During the war the regiment's depot in Acqui formed and mobilized the following unit commands:

- 2nd Army Corps Artillery Grouping
- 42nd Army Corps Artillery Grouping
- III Cannons Group with 105/28 cannons
- XXIII Cannons Group with 105/28 cannons
- L Howitzers Group with 105/28 cannons, which were replaced by 149/28 heavy field howitzers in 1941
- CIII Howitzers Group with 149/13 heavy howitzers
- CXXIII Howitzers Group with 149/13 heavy howitzers
- CXXIV Howitzers Group with 149/13 heavy howitzers
- CL Howitzers Group with 149/13 heavy howitzers
- CLXXI Howitzers Group with 149/19 heavy howitzers
- CLXXII Howitzers Group with 149/19 heavy howitzers
- CLXXIII Howitzers Group Group with 149/19 heavy howitzers
- CCCLXI Howitzers Group with 149/19 heavy howitzers
- CCCLXIII Howitzers Group with 149/19 heavy howitzers
- CCCLXVIII Howitzers Group with 149/19 heavy howitzers
- CLXII Self-propelled Group with 90/53 heavy self-propelled guns
- 2nd Army Corps Specialists Unit

The regiment's depot also formed and mobilized the batteries for the group commands. The groups operated either under command of army corps artillery groupings or as autonomous units. The depot was disbanded by invading German forces after the announcement of the Armistice of Cassibile on 8 September 1943.

- 2nd Army Corps Artillery Grouping: the grouping was mobilized on 20 August 1939 and consisted of a command, a command unit, the III, XXII, and L cannons groups with 105/28 cannons, the CIII, CXXIII, and CXXIV howitzers groups with 149/13 heavy howitzers, and the 2nd Army Corps Specialists Unit. In June 1940 the grouping participated in the invasion of France in the area of the Colle dell'Argentera. In spring 1942 the grouping was assigned to the Italian 8th Army, which was deployed in summer 1942 to the Eastern Front. The grouping was assigned to the II Army Corps and participated in Case Blue — the German offensive towards Stalingrad and the Caucasus. At the time the 2nd Army Corps Artillery Grouping consisted of the following units:

- 11th Army Corps Artillery Grouping
  - III Group
    - 3× Batteries — 4× 105/28 cannons per battery
  - XXIII Group
    - 3× Batteries — 4× 105/28 cannons per battery
  - CIII Group
    - 3× Batteries — 4× 149/13 heavy howitzers per battery
  - CXXIII Group
    - 3× Batteries — 4× 149/13 heavy howitzers per battery
  - 2nd Army Corps Specialists Unit
  - 52nd Anti-aircraft Battery — 8× 20/65 mod. 35 anti-aircraft guns
  - 54th Anti-aircraft Battery — 8× 20/65 mod. 35 anti-aircraft guns

In August 1942 the II Army Corps reached the Don river, where it remained until 11 December 1942, when the Soviets commenced Operation Little Saturn. By 16 December 1942 the collapse of the entire Italian front-line was underway and the heavily decimated Italian units began their retreat. On 3 January 1943 the remnants of the grouping reached Axis lines. In March 1943 the few survivors of the 2nd Army Corps Artillery Grouping were repatriated. In June 1943 the process to reform the grouping began and the III and XXII cannons groups with 105/28 cannons were reformed. The grouping also received the newly formed CLXXI, CLXXII, and CLXXIII howitzers groups with 149/19 heavy howitzers. The grouping was still in the process of being reformed when German forces disbanded it after the announcement of the Armistice of Cassibile on 8 September 1943.

- 42nd Army Corps Artillery Grouping: the grouping was formed on 27 February 1941 by the depot of the 3rd Army Corps Artillery Regiment. The grouping was sent as reinforcement to Albania for the Greco-Italian War. In Albania the grouping took command of the VII Cannons Group with 105/28 cannons and CVIII Howitzers Group with 149/13 heavy howitzers, which had both been formed by the 3rd Army Corps Artillery Regiment. The grouping also received the XXXII Cannons Group with 105/28 cannons and CXIX Howitzers Group with 149/13 heavy howitzers from the 26th Army Corps Artillery Grouping, which had been formed by the 26th Army Corps Artillery Regiment, and the V bombards Group with 240/12 L trench mortars, which had been formed by the 1st Army Artillery Regiment. The grouping also included three anti-aircraft batteries with 20/65 mod. 35 anti-aircraft guns. After returning to Italy the 42nd Army Corps Artillery Grouping was transferred from the 3rd Army Corps Artillery Regiment to the 2nd Army Corps Artillery Regiment, which became responsible for the mobilization of the grouping. In November 1942 the grouping participated in the occupation of Vichy France. Afterwards the grouping was assigned to the 4th Army and remained on occupation and coastal defense duty in the Italian occupied part of France. At the time the grouping consisted of the CCCLXI, CCCLXII, CCCLXIII, and CCCLXVIII howitzers groups with 149/19 heavy howitzers. The CCCLXII Howitzers Group had been mobilized by 1st Army Artillery Regiment. In early September 1943 the grouping was repatriated and disbanded by German forces after the announcement of the Armistice of Cassibile on 8 September 1943.

In November 1940 the regiment's CL Howitzers Group was transferred to Libya, where it was assigned to the 25th Army Corps Artillery Grouping, which had been formed by 10th Army Corps Artillery Regiment. The grouping was destroyed in January 1941 during the British Operation Compass, when British forces captured Tobruk.

On 21 April 1942 the regiment's depot formed the CLXII Self-propelled Group with 90/53 heavy self-propelled guns, which was assigned on 7 May 1942 to the 10th Self-propelled Artillery Grouping. The grouping had been formed as reinforcement for the Italian 8th Army, which fought on the Eastern Front, but in November 1942 it was assigned to the 6th Army and transferred to Sicily. There the grouping changed its name to 10th Anti-tank Artillery Grouping. In July 1943 the grouping fought against allied forces during the Allied invasion of Sicily. The grouping was heavily attrited in the fighting and the survivors were evacuated to mainland Italy, and sent to the depot of the 2nd Army Corps Artillery Regiment to help form the 236th Self-propelled Anti-tank Regiment for the 136th Armored Legionary Division "Centauro". On 31 August 1943 the 10th Anti-tank Artillery Grouping was declared lost due to wartime events and the next day process began to form the 236th Self-propelled Anti-tank Regiment.

For its conduct and bravery in June 1940 at the Colle dell'Argentera, and the conduct and sacrifice of the CL Howitzers Group at Tobruk in January 1941, and the 2nd Army Corps Artillery Grouping conduct and sacrifice in the Soviet Union the regiment was awarded a Silver Medal of Military Valor. The medal was affixed to the regiment's flag and is depicted on the regiment's coat of arms.

=== Cold War ===
During the 1975 army reform the army disbanded the regimental level and newly independent battalions and groups were granted for the first time their own flags. On 30 September 1976 the 9th Heavy Field Artillery Regiment in Foggia was disbanded and the next day, on 1 October 1976, the regiment's II Group in Barletta became an autonomous unit and was renamed 2nd Heavy Field Artillery Group "Potenza". The group was named for the city of Potenza in southern Italy and assigned the flag and traditions of the 2nd Heavy Field Artillery Regiment. The group consisted of a command, a command and services battery, and three batteries with M114 155 mm howitzers and was assigned to the Artillery Command of the Southern Military Region.

On 12 November 1976 the President of the Italian Republic Giovanni Leone assigned with decree 846 the flag and traditions of the 2nd Heavy Field Artillery Regiment to the group. At the time the group fielded 433 men (31 officers, 53 non-commissioned officers, and 349 soldiers).

On 6 December 1981 the 2nd Heavy Field Artillery Group "Potenza" lost its autonomy and entered the reformed 9th Heavy Field Artillery Regiment as the regiment's 2nd Group. Consequently the flag of the 2nd Heavy Field Artillery Regiment was returned to the Shrine of the Flags in the Vittoriano in Rome. On 1 March the 9th Heavy Field Artillery Regiment was disbanded again and the regiment's 2nd Group became once more autonomous as 2nd Heavy Field Artillery Group "Potenza". The group was again assigned to the Artillery Command of the Southern Military Region and the flag of the 2nd Heavy Field Artillery Regiment returned to Barletta.

=== Recent times ===
On 1 July 1991 the 11th Field Artillery Group "Teramo" was transferred from the Mechanized Brigade "Pinerolo" to the 8th Bersaglieri Brigade "Garibaldi". On the same date the 2nd Heavy Field Artillery Group "Potenza" was transferred from the Southern Military Region's Artillery Command to the Mechanized Brigade "Pinerolo" and renamed 2nd Field Artillery Group "Potenza". After the end of the Cold War, the Italian Army disbanded many of its artillery units in the country's Northeast and transferred their equipment to the remaining artillery units. In 1993 the 2nd Field Artillery Group "Potenza" received M109G 155 mm self-propelled howitzers and on 14 October of that year the group lost its autonomy and entered the next day the 2nd Self-propelled Field Artillery Regiment "Potenza".

On 10 October 1995 the batteries of the 52nd Self-propelled Field Artillery Regiment "Torino" in Brescia were disbanded and the flag of that regiment was transferred to Vercelli, where it supplanted the flag of the 131st Self-propelled Field Artillery Regiment "Centauro", which departed Vercelli and the next day, on 11 October 1995, supplanted the flag of the 2nd Self-propelled Field Artillery Regiment "Potenza" in Barletta. On 26 October of the same year the flag of the 2nd Self-propelled Field Artillery Regiment "Potenza" was transferred to the Shrine of the Flags in the Vittoriano in Rome.
