= 5th Heavy Field Artillery Regiment (Italy) =

Inactive Italian Army artillery unit

- 5° Reggimento Artiglieria Pesante Campale
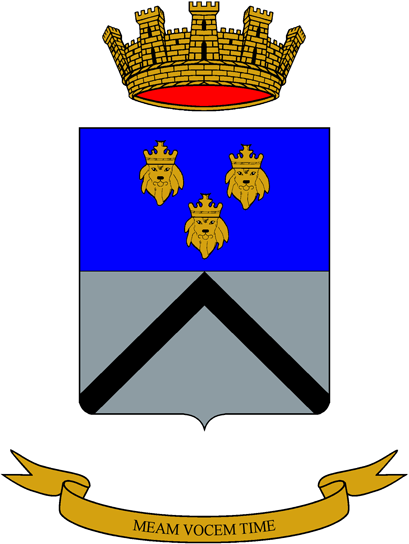
- Regimental coat of arms
- Active: 1 March 1928 — 8 Sept. 1943; 1 Oct. 1986 — 31 March 1991
- Country: Italy
- Branch: Italian Army
- Part of: 5th Army Corps
- Garrison/HQ: Udine
- Motto(s): "Meam vocem time"
- Anniversaries: 15 June 1918 - Second Battle of the Piave River

Insignia
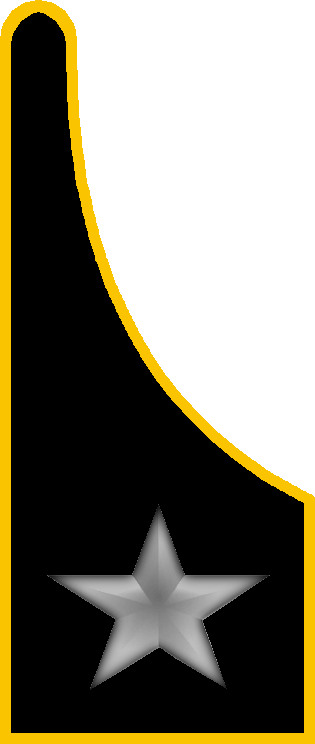
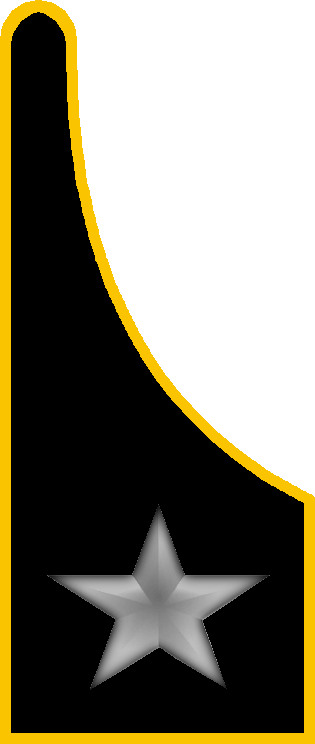
- Regimental gorget patches

The 5th Heavy Field Artillery Regiment (Italian: 5° Reggimento Artiglieria Pesante Campale) is an inactive artillery regiment of the Italian Army, which was based in Udine in Friuli-Venezia Giulia and assigned to the 5th Army Corps. Originally an artillery regiment of the Royal Italian Army, the regiment was formed in 1928 with pre-existing groups. During World War II the regiment formed two army corps artillery groupings, one of which participated in 1941 in the invasion of Yugoslavia and then remained there on occupation duty. The other grouping was sent in December 1942 to North Africa, where it participated in the Tunisian campaign and surrendered to allied troops in May 1943. The regiment and its remaining grouping were disbanded by invading German forces after the announcement of the Armistice of Cassibile on 8 September 1943.

In 1976 the Artillery Specialists Group "Mantova" was formed and assigned to the Mechanized Division "Mantova". In 1986 the division was disbanded, the group was transferred to the Artillery Command of the 5th Army Corps. At the same time the group was renamed 5th Artillery Specialists Group "Medea" and assigned the flag and traditions of the 5th Heavy Field Artillery Regiment. In 1991 the group was disbanded and the flag of the 5th Heavy Field Artillery Regiment was transferred to the Shrine of the Flags in the Vittoriano in Rome.

The regimental anniversary falls, as for all Italian Army artillery regiments, on June 15, the beginning of the Second Battle of the Piave River in 1918. This article is about the Royal Italian Army's 5th Heavy Field Artillery Regiment, which was a support unit assigned to a corps-level command. This regiment is unrelated to the 5th Heavy Artillery Regiment, which was a support unit assigned to an army-level command, and unrelated to the 5th Field Artillery Regiment, which was a support unit assigned to a division-level command.

== History ==
On 1 March 1928 the 5th Heavy Field Artillery Regiment was formed in Pula, as replacement for the 5th Heavy Field Artillery Regiment, which had been formed in 1920 and been renamed on 5 August 1927 as 11th Heavy Field Artillery Regiment. On 1 May 1939 the 11th Heavy Field Artillery Regiment, was renamed 14th Heavy Field Artillery Regiment and a new 11th Heavy Field Artillery Regiment was formed on 10 November 1939. The 5th Heavy Field Artillery Regiment in Pula consisted of a command, a command unit, the I Cannons Group, which had been the II Cannons Group of the preceding 5th Heavy Field Artillery Regiment, the II Cannons Group, which had been the I Cannons Group of the 7th Heavy Field Artillery Regiment, and the III Howitzers Group, which had been the IV Howitzers Group of the 9th Heavy Field Artillery Regiment. The new regiment's I and II groups were equipped with 105/28 cannons, while the III Howitzers Group was equipped with 149/12 howitzers. On 10 March 1932 the regiment formed the IV Howitzers Group with 149/13 heavy howitzers.

On 1 October 1934 the regiment was renamed 5th Army Corps Artillery Regiment. On 24 January 1935 the regiment incorporated the V Motorized Group with 75/27 mod. 11 field guns, which had been transferred from the 4th Artillery Regiment "Carnaro" of the 15th Infantry Division "Carnaro". In 1935-36 the regiment provided seven officers and 200 enlisted to augment units deployed for the Second Italo-Ethiopian War.

On 12 May 1939 the V Motorized Group was transferred to the 132nd Armored Artillery Regiment, which was assigned to the 132nd Armored Division "Ariete"

=== World War II ===
At the outbreak of World War II the regiment consisted of a command and four groups. During the war the regiment's depot in Pula formed and mobilized the following unit commands:

- 5th Army Corps Artillery Grouping
- 29th Army Corps Artillery Grouping
- XII Cannons Group with 105/28 cannons
- XIX Cannons Group with 105/28 cannons
- XX Cannons Group with 105/28 cannons
- LVII Cannons Group with 105/32 heavy field guns
- CXII Howitzers Group with 149/13 heavy howitzers
- CXX Howitzers Group with 149/13 heavy howitzers
- 5th Army Corps Specialists Unit

The regiment's depot also formed and mobilized the batteries for the group commands. The groups operated either under command of army corps artillery groupings or as autonomous units. The depot was disbanded by invading German forces after the announcement of the Armistice of Cassibile on 8 September 1943.

- 5th Army Corps Artillery Grouping: the grouping was mobilized at the outbreak of World War II. On 10 June 1940, the day Italy entered the war, the grouping consisted of a command, a command unit, the XII and XX cannons groups with 105/28 cannons, the CXII and CXX howitzers groups with 149/13 heavy howitzers, and the 5th Army Corps Specialists Unit. In this configuration the grouping participated in April 1941 in the invasion of Yugoslavia, after which the grouping remained on occupation duty in Yugoslavia. The grouping was in the area of Rijeka, when the Armistice of Cassibile was announced on 8 September 1943 and shortly thereafter German forces disbanded the grouping.
- 29th Army Corps Artillery Grouping: the grouping was formed at the outbreak of World War II as support unit of the Armored Army Corps. On 10 June 1940, the day Italy entered the war, the grouping consisted of a command, a command unit, the LVII Cannons Group with 105/32 heavy field guns, the LVIII Cannons Group with 105/32 heavy field guns, which had been formed by the 11th Army Corps Artillery Regiment, and the LIX Cannons Group with 105/32 heavy field guns, which had been formed by the 14th Army Corps Artillery Regiment. The grouping was transferred to Sicily and assigned XVI Army Corps. There the grouping received the 33rd and 35th anti-aircraft batteries with 20/65 mod. 35 anti-aircraft guns. In December 1942 the grouping was sent to North Africa, where it participated in the Tunisian campaign. The grouping surrendered to allied forces on 13 May 1943.

=== Cold War ===
During the 1975 army reform the army disbanded the regimental level and newly independent battalions and groups were granted for the first time their own flags. On 31 December 1975 the 5th Field Artillery Regiment in Udine was disbanded and the next day the regiment's Command and Services Battery and the regiment's Specialists Battery formed the Artillery Specialists Group "Mantova", which was assigned to the Artillery Command of the Mechanized Division "Mantova". The group consisted of a command, a command and services battery, and a specialists battery, which provided weather-ballistic data to the division's two heavy self-propelled field artillery groups and to the artillery groups of the division's Mechanized Brigade "Brescia", Mechanized Brigade "Isonzo", and Armored Brigade "Pozzuolo del Friuli". At the time the group fielded 290 men (15 officers, 36 non-commissioned officers, and 239 soldiers).

In 1986 the Italian Army abolished the divisional level and consequently the Mechanized Division "Mantova" was disbanded on 30 September 1986. The next day, 1 October 1986, the Artillery Specialists Group "Mantova" was renamed 5th Artillery Specialists Group "Medea" and assigned the flag and traditions of the 5th Heavy Field Artillery Regiment. The group was named for the hill of Medea, which had been a key observation post for Royal Italian Army artillery observers during the Battles of the Isonzo in World War I. On the same date the group joined the Artillery Command of the 5th Army Corps. On 13 July 1987 the President of the Italian Republic Francesco Cossiga confirmed the assignment of the flag of the 5th Heavy Field Artillery Regiment to the group.

=== Recent times ===
On 31 March 1991 the 5th Artillery Specialists Group "Medea" was placed into reserve status and on 8 May the flag of the 5th Heavy Field Artillery Regiment was returned to the Shrine of the Flags in the Vittoriano in Rome. On 30 June of the same year the group was officially disbanded.
