= 47th Artillery Regiment "Bari" =

Inactive Italian Army artillery unit

- 47° Reggimento Artiglieria "Bari"
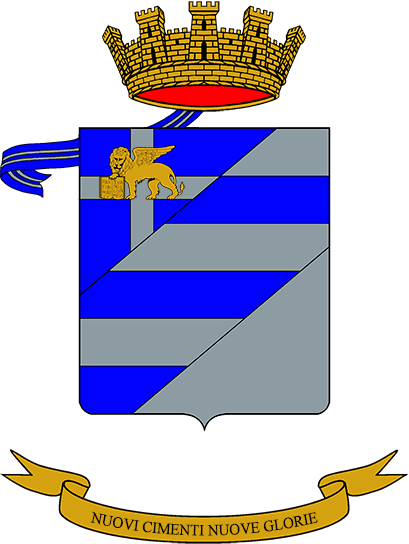
- Regimental coat of arms
- Active: May 1915 — Feb. 1919; 15 Sept. 1939 — 21 Sept. 1944; 1 March 1951 — 15 Nov. 1960; 1 Nov. 1975 — 5 Dec. 1981; 1 March 1986 — 31 March 1991
- Country: Italy
- Branch: Italian Army
- Part of: Southern Military Region
- Garrison/HQ: Bari
- Mottos: "Nuovi cimenti, nuove glorie"
- Anniversaries: 15 June 1918 - Second Battle of the Piave River
- Decorations: 1x War Cross of Military Valor

Insignia
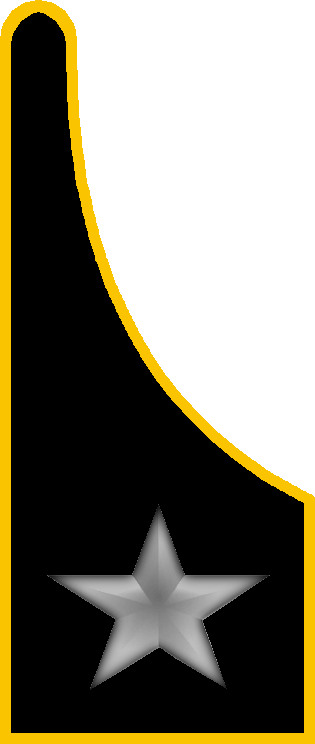
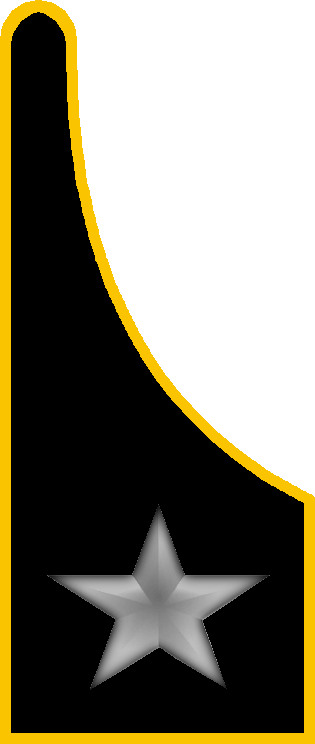
- Regimental gorget patches

The 47th Artillery Regiment "Bari" (Italian: 47° Reggimento Artiglieria "Bari") is an inactive field artillery regiment of the Italian Army, which was based in Bari in Apulia. Originally an artillery regiment of the Royal Italian Army, the regiment was formed days before Italy's entry into World War I and disbanded after the war. The regiment was reformed in 1939 and assigned in World War II to the 47th Infantry Division "Bari", with which the regiment fought in the Greco-Italian War. The division and regiment were located in Sardinia when the Armistice of Cassibile was announced on 8 September 1943. The division clashed with retreating German forces and then joined the Italian Co-belligerent Army. On 21 September the division and its units were disbanded and the personnel used to form the Internal Security Division "Aosta".

The regiment was reformed in 1951 and assigned to the Infantry Division "Avellino". In 1960 the division was reduced to brigade and the regiment was disbanded. In 1975 unit was once more reformed as 47th Field Artillery Group "Gargano" and assigned to the Motorized Brigade "Pinerolo". In 1981 the group was transferred to the Southern Military Region and ten years later, in 1991, it was disbanded. The regimental anniversary falls, as for all Italian Army artillery regiments, on June 15, the beginning of the Second Battle of the Piave River in 1918.

== History ==
=== World War I ===
In May 1915, just days before Italy's entry into World War I, the 47th Field Artillery Regiment was formed in Caserta by the depot of the 10th Field Artillery Regiment. The new regiment was assigned to the newly formed XIV Army Corps as the corps' artillery regiment and consisted of a command and two groups with initially five batteries equipped with 75/27 mod. 06 field guns. The regiment's 3rd Battery was only formed later and finally joined the regiment at the front on 15 October 1915.

During the war the regiment served on the Italian front, where it fought in summer 1915 on Monte San Michele and in November of the same year at San Martino del Carso. In 1916 the regiment was again on Monte San Michele and then on Nad Logen and the Pečinka. The first half of 1917 the regiment was deployed on Fajti Hrib and on the Volkowniak. At the start of the Battle of Caporetto the regiment was at Cotiči. After retreating with the army to the Tagliamento river the regiment participated in delaying actions along the river before falling back to the Piave, where the regiment fought in the First Battle of the Piave River. In the Second Battle of the Piave River in June 1918 the regiment was positioned near Candelù. During the decisive Battle of Vittorio Veneto the regiment was initially at Fossalta before advancing to Livenza, where the news of the Armistice of Villa Giusti reached the regiment.

After the war the regiment was disbanded in February 1919.

=== World War II ===
On 15 September 1939 the depot of the 14th Artillery Regiment "Ferrara" in Bari reformed the 47th Artillery Regiment "Bari". The regiment was based in Bari and assigned to the 47th Infantry Division "Bari", which also included the 139th Infantry Regiment "Bari" and 140th Infantry Regiment "Bari". The regiment consisted of a command, a command unit, the II Group with 75/27 mod. 11 field guns, the III Group with 75/13 mod. 15 mountain guns, and the 347th Anti-aircraft Battery with 20/65 mod. 35 anti-aircraft guns. On 18 June 1940 the depot of the 14th Artillery Regiment "Ferrara" formed the I Group with 100/17 mod. 14 howitzers for the regiment and in September of the same year the II Group switched to 75/13 mod. 15 mountain guns.

In October 1940 the division was sent to Albania to reinforce Italian units engaged in the Greco-Italian War. For the next three months the division was in heavy combat against Greek forces, until the division was sent to the rear at the end of January 1941. On the 14th of that month the artillery regiment received the IV Group with 75/27 mod. 11 field guns. The division returned to the front in April 1941 and participated the Battle of Greece. In June 1941, the division was repatriated to Apulia.

For its conduct in Albania and Greece the 47th Artillery Regiment "Bari" was awarded a War Cross of Military Valor, which was affixed on the regiment's flag and is depicted on the regiment's coat of arms.

In April 1943 the regiment ceded its first three groups to other regiments (including the 152nd Artillery Regiment "Piceno") and was sent to the North of Sardinia, where the division was tasked with coastal defense duties. In Sardinian the regiment received new groups and on 1 May 1943 consisted of a command, a command unit, the newly assigned I Group with 100/17 mod. 14 howitzers, its own IV Group with 75/27 mod. 11 field guns, which was renumbered II Group, the III Group with 7.5cm Pak 40 anti-tank guns, and the LXXIX Group with 75/46 C.A. mod. 34 anti-aircraft guns.

After the Armistice of Cassibile was announced on 8 September 1943 the division participated in the pursuit of German units evacuating Sardinia. The division then joined the Italian Co-Belligerent Army and shipped to Sicily. On 16 June 1944 the regiment consisted of the following units:

- 47th Artillery Regiment "Bari"
  - Command Unit
  - I Group with 149/13 mod. 14 (A) heavy howitzers (Former CXXIX Group ceded by the 13th Artillery Grouping of the XIII Army Corps)
  - II Group with 100/17 mod. 14 howitzers
  - III Group with 75/27 mod. 11 field guns
  - IV III Group with 7.5cm Pak 40 anti-tank guns
  - 347th Anti-aircraft Battery with 20/65 mod. 35 anti-aircraft guns

On 10 August the units of the division started the process of being reorganized into Security and Guard Groups, to free up the groups of the 104th Infantry Division "Mantova" and 152nd Infantry Division "Piceno", which were destined to form the Combat Group "Mantova" respectively the Combat Group "Piceno". On 21 September 1944 the regiment was disbanded and the regiment's command formed the 6th Guards Regiment, which was assigned to the 210th Auxiliary Division on 14 October 1944.

=== Cold War ===
On 1 March 1951 the 47th Field Artillery Regiment was reformed in Santa Maria Capua Vetere and assigned to the Infantry Division "Avellino". Initially the regiment consisted of a command and the I Group with M101 105 mm towed howitzers. On 11 March 1951 the regiment formed its command unit, and on 1 May of the same year the II Group with M101 105 mm towed howitzers. On 1 January 1953 the regiment formed the III Group with QF 25-pounder field guns, the IV Group with towed M114 155 mm howitzers, and the V Light Anti-aircraft Group with 40/56 autocannons. In August 1954 the I and II groups switched to QF 25-pounder field guns. On 30 November the I, II, IV and V groups were disbanded and the next day the III Group was renumbered as I Group, and a new II Mixed Group was formed, which consisted of one battery with M114 155 mm howitzers, one light anti-aircraft battery with 40/56 autocannons, an artillery specialists section, and a Light Aircraft Section with L-21B artillery observation planes.

In 1960 the Infantry Division "Avellino" was reduced to Infantry Brigade "Avellino" and consequently on 15 November 1960 the regiment was disbanded and the next day the personnel and materiel of the disbanded regiment were used to form the Field Artillery Group "Avellino". The group inherited the traditions of the 47th Artillery Regiment "Bari", but not the regiment's flag, which was transferred to the Shrine of the Flags in the Vittoriano in Rome. The group consisted of a command, a command and services battery, three batteries with 105/14 mod. 56 pack howitzers, and one light anti-aircraft battery with 40/56 autocannons, which was disbanded on 30 October 1962. In August 1964 the three batteries replaced their 105/14 mod. 56 pack howitzers with towed 105/22 mod. 14/61 howitzers. On 1 October 1965 the Infantry Brigade "Avellino" was disbanded, as was the Field Artillery Group "Avellino" on 20 October of the same year.

During the 1975 army reform the army disbanded the regimental level and newly independent battalions and groups were granted for the first time their own flags. On 1 November 1975 the Field Artillery Group "Pinerolo" of the Infantry Brigade "Pinerolo" was renamed 47th Field Artillery Group "Gargano". To avoid confusion with the 9th Motorized Infantry Battalion "Bari" the group was named for the Gargano peninsula to the north of the group's base in Bari. The group was assigned to the Motorized Brigade "Pinerolo" and consisted of a command, a command and services battery, and three batteries with towed M114 155 mm howitzers.

On 12 November 1976 the President of the Italian Republic Giovanni Leone assigned with decree 846 the flag and traditions of the 47th Artillery Regiment "Bari" to the group. At the time the group fielded 485 men (37 officers, 58 non-commissioned officers, and 390 soldiers).

On 5 December 1981 the group lost its autonomy and the next day the group entered the reformed 9th Heavy Field Artillery Regiment as 3rd Group. Consequently the flag of the 47th Artillery Regiment "Bari" was returned to the Shrine of the Flags in the Vittoriano in Rome.

On 28 February 1986 the 9th Heavy Field Artillery Regiment was disbanded and the next day the 3rd Group became autonomous again as 47th Heavy Field Artillery Group "Gargano". The group was assigned, together with the 2nd Heavy Field Artillery Group "Potenza" and 9th Heavy Field Artillery Group "Foggia" to the Artillery Command of the Southern Military Region. In following weeks the group retrieved the flag of the 47th Artillery Regiment "Bari" from the Shrine of the Flags in the Vittoriano.

=== Recent times ===
On 15 March 1991 the 9th Heavy Field Artillery Group "Foggia" and the 47th Heavy Field Artillery Group "Gargano" returned the flag of the 9th Heavy Field Artillery Regiment, respectively the 47th Artillery Regiment "Bari", to the Shrine of the Flags in the Vittoriano in Rome and on the 31st of the same month the two groups were disbanded.
