= 9th Heavy Field Artillery Regiment (Italy) =

Inactive Italian Army artillery unit

- 9° Reggimento Artiglieria Pesante Campale
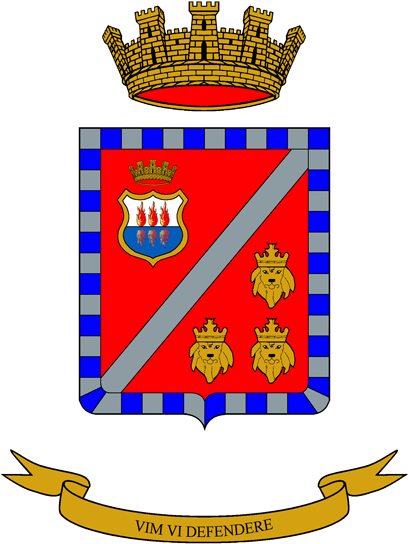
- Regimental coat of arms
- Active: 1 Aug. 1920 — 25 Sept. 1944; 1 June 1963 — 31 March 1991
- Country: Italy
- Branch: Italian Army
- Part of: Southern Military Region
- Garrison/HQ: Foggia
- Motto: "Vim vi defendere"
- Anniversaries: 15 June 1918 - Second Battle of the Piave River

Insignia
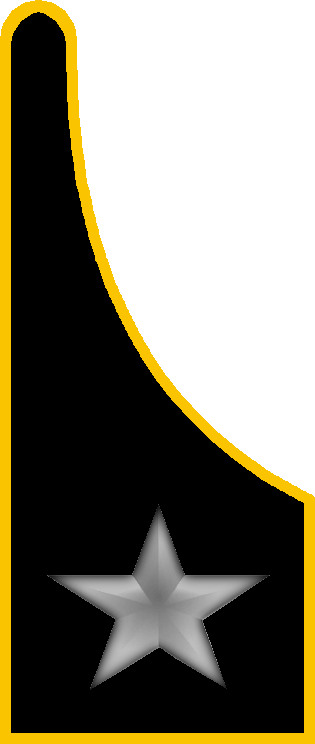
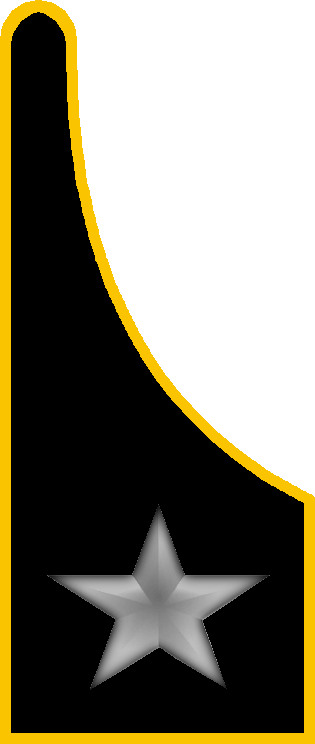
- Regimental gorget patches

The 9th Heavy Field Artillery Regiment (Italian: 9° Reggimento Artiglieria Pesante Campale) is an inactive artillery regiment of the Italian Army, which was based in Foggia in Apulia and assigned to the Artillery Command of the Southern Military Region. Originally an artillery regiment of the Royal Italian Army, the regiment was formed in 1920 with pre-existing groups, which had fought during World War I on the Italian front. During World War II the regiment formed the 9th and 41st army corps artillery groupings. The 9th Army Corps Artillery Grouping was tasked with coastal defense in Southern Italy until September 1942, when it was transferred to Athens in occupied Greece on occupation and coastal defense duties. The 41st Army Corps Artillery Grouping was tasked with coastal defense in Southern Apulia and in 1943 joined the Italian Co-belligerent Army on the allied side. The regiment and 9th Army Corps Artillery Grouping were disbanded by invading German forces after the announcement of the Armistice of Cassibile on 8 September 1943, while the 41st Army Corps Artillery Grouping remained active until September 1944.

The regiment was reformed in 1963 as 9th Heavy Field Artillery Regiment and assigned to the Artillery Command of the Southern Military Region. In 1976 the regiment was split into three autonomous groups and the regiment's flag and traditions were assigned to the 9th Heavy Field Artillery Group "Foggia". In 1981 the group was incorporated as 1st Group into the reformed 9th Heavy Field Artillery Regiment. The regiment was once more split into three autonomous groups in 1986 and the 9th Heavy Field Artillery Group "Foggia" once more inherited the regiment's flag and traditions. In 1991 the group was disbanded and its flag transferred to the Shrine of the Flags in the Vittoriano in Rome.

The regimental anniversary falls, as for all Italian Army artillery regiments, on June 15, the beginning of the Second Battle of the Piave River in 1918. This article is about the Royal Italian Army's 9th Heavy Field Artillery Regiment, which was a support unit assigned to a corps-level command. This regiment is unrelated to the 9th Heavy Artillery Regiment, which was a support unit assigned to an army-level command, and unrelated to the 9th Field Artillery Regiment, which was a support unit assigned to a division-level command.

== History ==
On 1 August 1920 the 9th Heavy Field Artillery Regiment was formed in Ancona by reorganizing and renaming the 31st Field Artillery Regiment, which consisted of the I and II groups with 105/28 cannons and the III Group with 149/12 howitzers. The new regiment also incorporated the IV Group with 149/12 howitzers, which had been the V Group of the 1st Heavy Field Artillery Regiment. In 1921 the regiment moved from Ancona to Senigallia and in December 1926 from Senigallia to Foggia.

On 24 May 1928 the regiment ceded its IV Group with 149/12 howitzers to help reform the 5th Heavy Field Artillery Regiment. On 1 October 1931 the regiment reformed the IV Group, which was now equipped with 149/13 heavy howitzers. In 1933 the regiment moved from Foggia to Teramo.

On 31 August 1934 the regiment's III Group was disbanded and on 30 September the Complement Officer Cadets School in Potenza was assigned to the regiment and redesignated as III School Group. The next day, on 1 October 1934, the regiment was renamed 9th Army Corps Artillery Regiment. On 10 April 1935 the regiment's II Group was mobilized as XIX Cannons Group with 105/28 cannons for the Second Italo-Ethiopian War and on 1 May the regiment formed a new II Group. In September of the same year the XIX Cannons Group received new equipment and was renamed CXIX Cannons Group with 149/13 heavy howitzers. The group was assigned to the 7th Army Corps Artillery Grouping, which had been formed the 7th Army Corps Artillery Regiment. After the end of the Second Italo-Ethiopian War the CXIX Cannons Group was disbanded.

On 1 October 1937 the regiment's depot formed the command of the 21st Army Corps Artillery Regiment, which was transferred to Libya and assigned to the XXI Army Corps. One month later, on 1 November 1937, the Complement Officer Cadets School in Potenza became an autonomous unit again and left the regiment.

In January 1939 the regiment's III Group with 149/13 heavy howitzers was mobilized and the personnel, dressed in civilian clothes, embarked for Spain. There the Italian "volunteers" joined the Corpo Truppe Volontarie, which fought on the Nationalist side in the Spanish Civil War. Back in Italy the regiment formed a new III Group with 149/13 heavy howitzers. On 25 March 1939 the regiment's II Group was mobilized as XVIII Cannons Group with 105/28 cannons, while the IV Group was mobilized as CXIX Cannons Group with 149/13 heavy howitzers. Both groups were readied for the Italian invasion of Albania, which commenced on 7 April. Both groups were shipped to Albania with the second wave of Italian units. On 1 September 1939 the regiment also mobilized its I Group as XLVI Cannons Group with 105/28 cannons and formed two anti-aircraft batteries with 20/65 mod. 35 anti-aircraft guns for the occupation of Albania.

=== World War II ===
At the outbreak of World War II the regiment consisted of a command and four groups. During the war the regiment's depot in Teramo formed and mobilized the following unit commands:

- 9th Army Corps Artillery Grouping
- 41st Coastal Artillery Grouping, which was assigned to the 209th Coastal Division
- 45th Coastal Artillery Grouping, which was assigned to the 212th Coastal Division
- IV Cannons Group with 100/17 mod. 14 howitzers
- XVIII Cannons Group with 105/28 cannons
- XXVII Cannons Group with 105/28 cannons
- XXXIII Cannons Group with 105/28 cannons
- XLVI Cannons Group with 105/28 cannons
- CXVIII Howitzers Group with 149/13 heavy howitzers
- CXIX Howitzers Group with 149/13 heavy howitzers
- CXLVI Howitzers Group with 149/12 howitzers
- CXXXI Howitzers Group with 149/28 heavy field howitzers
- 9th Army Corps Specialists Unit

The regiment's depot also formed and mobilized the batteries for the group commands. The groups operated either under command of army corps artillery groupings or as autonomous units. The depot was disbanded by invading German forces after the announcement of the Armistice of Cassibile on 8 September 1943.

- 9th Army Corps Artillery Grouping: the grouping was mobilized on 12 June 1940 and consisted of a command, a command unit, the XXVII, XXXIII, and XLVI cannons groups with 105/28 cannons, the CXVIII Howitzers Group with 149/13 heavy howitzers, the 9th Army Corps Specialists Unit, and the 73rd and 75th anti-aircraft batteries with 20/65 mod. 35 anti-aircraft guns. In October 1940 the XVIII Cannons Group with 105/28 cannons was reorganized as coastal artillery unit and transferred to Albania and in January 1941 the grouping received the CXXXI Howitzers Group Group with 149/28 heavy field howitzers, which had been formed by the Artillery School in Nettunia. In May 1941 the grouping was assigned to the 101st Motorized Division "Trieste" and intended to deploy to Libya for the Western Desert campaign, but ultimately the division departed for North Africa without the grouping. In July 1942 the grouping was assigned to the 11th Motorized Division "Brennero" and consisted of the following units:

- 9th Army Corps Artillery Grouping
  - Command Unit
  - XXXIII Cannons Group with 105/28 cannons
  - XLVI Cannons Group with 105/28 cannons
  - XLVII Anti-aircraft Group with 75/46 C.A. mod. 34 anti-aircraft guns (transferred from the 2nd Anti-aircraft Artillery Regiment)
  - DLVIII Self-propelled Group with Semovente da 75/18 (on M14/41 chassis) self-propelled guns
  - 311th Anti-aircraft Battery with 20/65 mod. 35 anti-aircraft guns
  - 348th Anti-aircraft Battery with 20/65 mod. 35 anti-aircraft guns

On 3 September 1942 the grouping arrived in Athens in occupied Greece, where it remained on occupation and coastal defense duties until German forces disbanded it after the announcement of the Armistice of Cassibile on 8 September 1943.

- 41st Army Corps Artillery Grouping: the command of the grouping was formed on 27 February 1941 and in March the command was sent to Albania as reinforcements for the Greco-Italian War. After the end of operations in Greece the grouping returned to Italy. In May 1943 the grouping was sent to Bari in Southern Apulia and assigned to the IX Army Corps. The grouping was tasked with coastal defense and consisted of the LXXXIV Group with batteries of various caliber, the CXLIX Howitzers Group with 149/12 howitzers, which had been mobilized by the 10th Army Corps Artillery Regiment, the CXCVI Group with 149/35 heavy guns, and the CXCVII Group with 152/37 heavy field guns. After the announcement of the Armistice of Cassibile on 8 September 1943 the grouping sided with the King of Italy Victor Emmanuel II and joined the Italian Co-belligerent Army on the allied side. The grouping's personnel and materiel are used to form new units and replenish existing ones. The grouping was disbanded in September 1944.

=== Cold War ===
On 1 June 1963 the 9th Heavy Field Artillery Regiment was reformed in Foggia. The regiment was assigned to the Artillery Command of the Southern Military Region and consisted of a command, a command unit, and the I, II, and III groups with M114 155mm howitzers. In 1974 the regiment's III Group was placed in reserve status, and reformed as an active unit in 1975 in Persano. At the end of 1975 the regiment consisted of the following units:

- 9th Heavy Field Artillery Regiment, in Foggia
  - Command and Services Battery, in Foggia
  - I Group with M114 155mm howitzers, in Foggia
  - II Group with M114 155mm howitzers, in Barletta
  - III Group with M114 155mm howitzers, in Persano
  - 9th Artillery Specialists Battery, in Foggia

During the 1975 army reform the army disbanded the regimental level and newly independent battalions and groups were granted for the first time their own flags. On 30 September 1976 the 9th Heavy Field Artillery Regiment in Foggia was disbanded and the next day, on 1 October 1976, the regiment's I Group in Foggia became an autonomous unit and was renamed 9th Heavy Field Artillery Group "Foggia". The group was assigned the flag and traditions of the 9th Heavy Field Artillery Regiment. On the same day the regiment's II Group in Barletta became an autonomous unit as 2nd Heavy Field Artillery Group "Potenza", while the regiment's III Group in Persano became an autonomous unit as 11th Heavy Field Artillery Group "Teramo". All three groups were assigned to the Artillery Command of the Southern Military Region and consisted of a command, a command and services battery, and three batteries with M114 155mm howitzers and was assigned to the Artillery Command of the Southern Military Region.

On 12 November 1976 the President of the Italian Republic Giovanni Leone assigned with decree 846 the flag and traditions of the 9th Heavy Field Artillery Regiment to the group. At the time the group fielded 433 men (31 officers, 53 non-commissioned officers, and 349 soldiers).

On 6 December 1981 the 9th Heavy Field Artillery Regiment was reformed in Foggia and incorporated the 9th Heavy Field Artillery Group "Foggia" as 1st Group, the 2nd Heavy Field Artillery Group "Potenza" as 2nd Group, and the 47th Field Artillery Group "Gargano" as 3rd Group. On the same date the flag of the 9th Heavy Field Artillery Regiment passed from the 9th Heavy Field Artillery Group "Foggia" to the regiment, while the flags of the other two groups were transferred to the Shrine of the Flags in the Vittoriano in Rome. The reformed regiment was assigned to the Southern Military Region's Artillery Command and consisted of the following units:

- 9th Heavy Field Artillery Regiment, in Foggia
  - Command and Services Battery, in Foggia
  - 1st Group with M114 155mm howitzers, in Foggia
  - 2nd Group with M114 155mm howitzers, in Barletta
  - 3rd Group with M114 155mm howitzers, in Bari

On 1 March 1986 the regiment was once more disbanded and its three groups became autonomous under their previous names again. The three groups received the regimental flags again and were once more assigned to the Southern Military Region's Artillery Command:

- 2nd Heavy Field Artillery Group "Potenza", in Barletta
- 9th Heavy Field Artillery Group "Foggia", in Foggia
- 47th Heavy Field Artillery Group "Gargano", in Bari

=== Recent times ===
On 15 March 1991 the 9th Heavy Field Artillery Group "Foggia" and the 47th Heavy Field Artillery Group "Gargano" returned the flag of the 9th Heavy Field Artillery Regiment, respectively the 47th Artillery Regiment "Bari", to the Shrine of the Flags in the Vittoriano in Rome and on the 31st of the same month the two groups were disbanded.
