= 47th Infantry Division "Bari" =

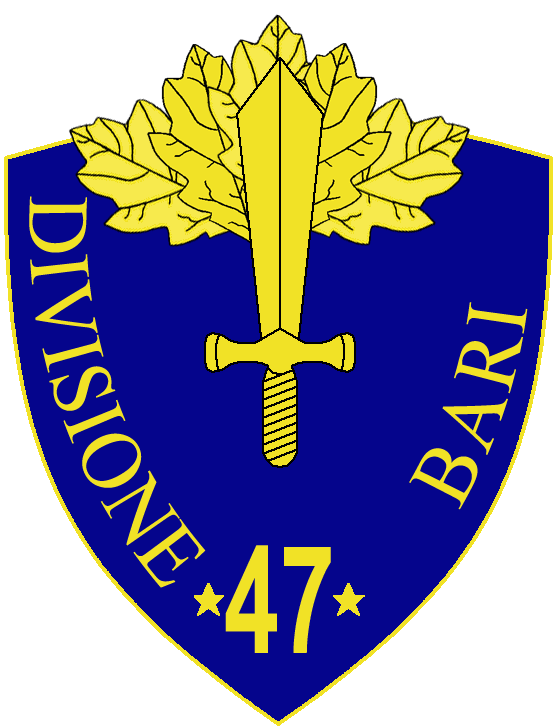
- 47th Infantry Division "Bari" insignia
- Active: 1939 – 1944
- Country: Kingdom of Italy
- Branch: Royal Italian Army
- Type: Infantry
- Size: Division
- Garrison/HQ: Bari
- Engagements: World War II

Commanders
- Notable commanders: General Ernesto Zaccone

Insignia
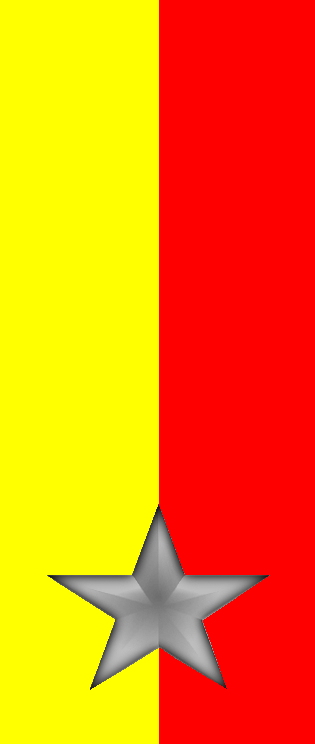
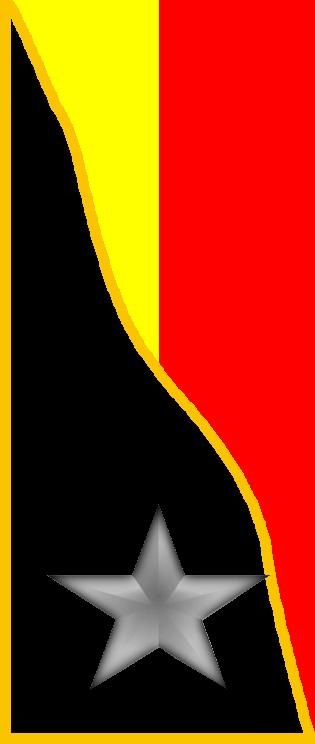
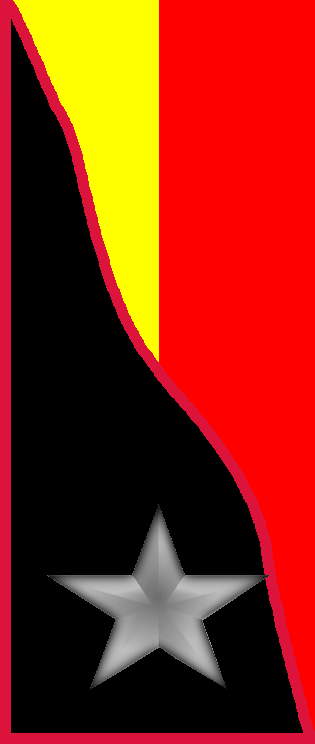
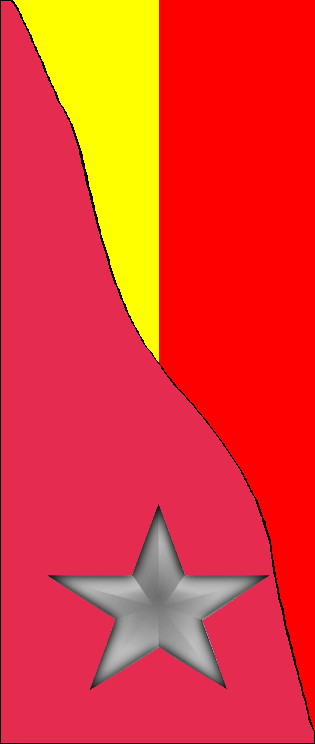
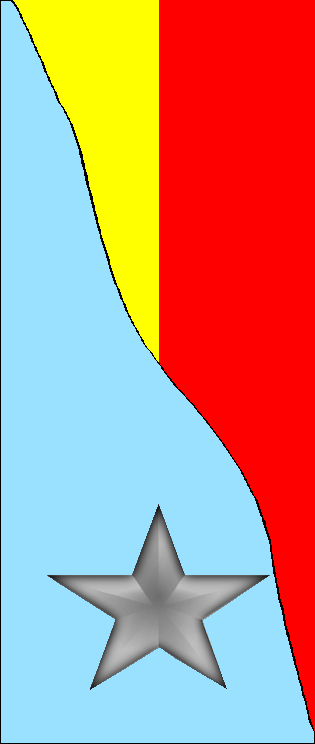
- Identification symbol: Bari gorget patches

The 47th Infantry Division "Bari" (Italian: 47ª Divisione di fanteria "Bari") was an infantry division of the Royal Italian Army during World War II. The Bari was formed on 15 September 1939 in the city of Bari. After the announcement of the Armistice of Cassibile on 8 September 1943 the division became part of the Italian Co-belligerent Army. On 21 September 1944 the division was reorganized as Internal Security Division "Aosta". The Bari drafted its men in Bari and the surrounding Salento region.

== History ==
=== World War I ===
The division's lineage begins with the Brigade "Bari" established in Bari in March 1915 in preparation for Italy's entry in World War I. The brigade consisted of the 139th and 140th infantry regiments and fought on the Italian front. After the war the brigade was disbanded in July 1920.

On 15 September 1939 the 47th Infantry Division "Bari" was activated Bari and received its two reactivated namesake infantry regiments and the reformed 47th Artillery Regiment "Bari". The division's units were raised by the regimental depots of the 23rd Infantry Division "Ferrara", which had been transferred to Albania in spring 1939.

=== World War II ===
On 28 October 1940 the Bari embarked for Vlorë in Albania to reinforce the Italian units engaged in the Battle of Pindus of the Greco-Italian War. All units of the division were en route by 31 October 1940 and were separately sent to the front immediately after disembarking. The 140th Infantry Regiment "Bari" reached border positions at Leskovik on 2 November 1940, while the 139th Infantry Regiment "Bari" was sent to Konitsa in Greek territory, where the regiment was attached to the 3rd Alpine Division "Julia" and engaged immediately in heavy fighting. Greek forces tried to capture the key road junction of Perati Bridge to the rear of the 139th Infantry Regiment. Although holding its positions and successfully counter-attacking from 4–7 November 1940, the defeat of the 3rd Alpine Division "Julia" on 8 November 1940 resulted in the positions of the 139th Infantry Regiment being extended along the Sarantaporos river to cover the Julia's retreat. The positions from Konitsa to the Sarantaporos river were held on 11–14 November 1940, but by 15 November 1940 the Bari was forced to abandon Greek territory and concentrate on the defence of the Perati Bridge. Heavy Greek attacks were repulsed 17–18 November 1940, but on 20 November 1940 Greek breakthroughs nearby resulted in a chain reaction Italian defensive positions being overrun. The defence of Perati Bridge then degenerated into bloody rout, with few Italian survivors fleeing to Leskovik and Cerckë, where they joined the 140th Infantry Regiment. The events of that day served as the inspiration for the Alpini song "Sul Ponte Di Perati".

On 21 November 1940 the re-united Bari blocked the Perati-Përmet road in the Aoös valley. After severe fighting the remnants of the Bari were relieved from front line duties in the Këlcyrë area on 29 November 1940. The division's new orders were to build a fortified line between Bodar and Mount Dhëmbel. As Italian forces continued to retreat, the new line came under Greek attack from 16 December 1940. On 23 December 1940 the Bari's reserve units were sent forward to stop the Greek breakthrough south of Qarrisht' e Fratarit. At the beginning of January 1941 the Bari was concentrated along a line from the western outskirts of Këlcyrë to Mal Trebeshinë. On 2 January 1941 the Greeks started a new offensive and quickly captured Qafa e Kiçokut. By 8 January 1941 the positions of Bari were severely outflanked, forcing the division to retreat from Këlcyrë, which resulted in the Capture of Klisura Pass on 10 January 1941 and set the stage for the Battle of Trebeshina. Consequently, the Bari retreated north to the Ball - Panarit line. The Greek ski-equipped light forces continued to try to envelop the Bari positions from the north in order to open the way to Berat, which resulted in a particularly violent clash on 15 January 1941, but the Italian front line was stabilized nonetheless. After repulsing another Greek assault around Vinokash and Kajcë 29 January 1941, the Bari was replaced by 51st Infantry Division "Siena" and sent to the rear at Roskovec for reorganization.

On 5 March 1941 the Bari moved from the reserve to the second echelon, north of Qafa e Kiçokut. On 9 March 1941 the division moved to Mali i Shëndëllisë mountain, between the 38th Infantry Division "Puglie" on the right and the 59th Infantry Division "Cagliari" on the left, as part of the Italian Spring Offensive. On 13–14 March 1941 the Bari participated in the "Battle of Hill 731" - a failed assault on Monastery Hill near Komarak, resulting in thousands of Italian soldiers killed. On 19 March 1941 the Bari, together with the 51st Infantry Division "Siena" and 131st Armored Division "Centauro", renewed the attacks on Monastery Hill (18 attempts in a row). The attacks resulted in all Italian tanks destroyed or disabled and the Italian infantry being killed, wounded or captured. Due to the heavy losses suffered the Bari was sent to the rear on 23 March 1941.

The Bari returned to the front on 14 April 1941 near Qafa e Kiçokut, as the Battle of Greece started. On 16 April 1941 the Bari reached Këlcyrë (captured 2 days before by the Siena) and on 17 April 1941 the division reached Përoi i Lemnicës. The Bari then advanced to Përmet and later Perati, where contact with Greek forces was re-established. The clean-up of the Perati area was conducted through 20–23 April 1941. After the end of active fighting, the Bari stayed at Konitsa on the Sarantaporos river. Later in May 1941 the Bari undertook mopping-up operations in the Aoös valley. After the end of the war in Greece the Bari was one of the divisions earmarked for the proposed invasion of Malta, which was ultimately cancelled. In June 1941, the division was repatriated to Apulia, where it performed coastal defence duties from Brindisi to Taranto.

In September 1942 the division was transferred to Tuscany, where it was stationed in the area of Livorno and Pisa, and on Elba island. On 5 December 1942 the division moved to Rome and was garrisoned in Cesano, Cecchignola and Centocelle. In April 1943 the division shipped to Oristano in the North of Sardinia, where it was tasked with coastal defense duties, as part of the XXX Corps. After the Armistice of Cassibile was announced on 8 September 1943 the Bari participated in the pursuit of German units evacuating Sardinia, with minor clashes occurring on 17 September 1943. The Bari was dissolved on 21 September 1944, and its personnel was used to form the Internal Security Division "Aosta" on 14 October 1944.

== Organization ==
47th Infantry Division "Bari" organization in 1940

- 47th Infantry Division "Bari", in Bari
  - Headquarters
    - Command Company
    - 739th Carabinieri Section
    - 740th Carabinieri Section
    - 72nd Field Post Office
    - 47th Infantry Division Command Transport Squad
  - 139th Infantry Regiment "Bari", in Bari
    - Command Company
    - 3 × Fusilier battalions
    - Support Weapons Battery (65/17 mod. 13 infantry support guns)
    - Mortar Company (81mm mod. 35 mortars)
  - 140th Infantry Regiment "Bari", in Lecce
    - Command Company
    - 3 × Fusilier battalions
    - Support Weapons Battery (65/17 mod. 13 infantry support guns)
    - Mortar Company (81mm mod. 35 mortars)
  - 47th Artillery Regiment "Bari", in Bari
    - Command Unit
    - I Group (100/17 mod. 14 howitzers; formed on 8 June 1940 by the depot of the 14th Artillery Regiment "Ferrara")
    - II Group (75/27 mod. 11 field guns; re-equipped with in September 1940 with 75/13 mod. 15 mountain guns)
    - III Group (75/13 mod. 15 mountain guns)
    - IV Group (75/27 mod. 11 field guns; joined the regiment on 14 January 1941)
    - 347th Anti-aircraft battery (20/65 mod. 35 anti-aircraft guns)
  - 47th Artillery Regiment "Bari" (after being transferred to Sardinia)
    - Command Unit
    - I Group (100/17 mod. 14 howitzers; joined the regiment in April 1943)
    - II Group (75/27 mod. 11 field guns; former IV Group and renumbered II Group in April 1943)
    - III Group (7.5cm Pak 40 anti-tank guns; joined the regiment in April 1943)
    - LXXIX Group (75/46 C.A. mod. 34 anti-aircraft guns; joined the regiment in April 1943)
    - Ammunition and Supply Unit
  - XLVII Mortar Battalion (81mm mod. 35 mortars)
  - CXXXIX Replacements Battalion (joined the division in Sardinia)
  - CXL Replacements Battalion (joined the division in Sardinia)
  - 47th Anti-tank Company (47/32 mod. 35 anti-tank guns)
  - 55th Engineer Company
  - 47th Telegraph and Radio Operators Company
  - 33rd Medical Section
    - 427th Field Hospital
    - 428th Field Hospital
    - 1 × Surgical unit
  - 33rd Supply Section
  - 47th Autocarrette Section
  - 183rd Transport Section (joined the division in Sardinia)
  - 847th Transport Section

Attached to the division from 1941:

- 152nd CC.NN. Legion "Salentina" (renamed on 1 November 1943: 139th Infantry Regiment bis; renamed on 1 December 1943: 340th Infantry Regiment "Bari")
  - CLII CC.NN. Battalion
  - CLV CC.NN. Battalion
  - 152nd CC.NN. Machine Gun Company

Attached to the division from 22 March 1943:

- 13th Army Corps Artillery Grouping
  - XL Group (105/28 cannons)
  - LXIII Group (149/13 heavy howitzers)
  - CCCXVI Group
- III Squadrons Group "Cavalleggeri di Sardegna"

== Commanding officers ==
The division's commanding officers were:

- Generale di Divisione Ernesto Zaccone (15 September 1939 - 16 November 1940)
- Generale di Brigata Achille d'Havet (17 November 1940 - 16 February 1941)
- Generale di Divisione Matteo Negro (17 February 1941 - 30 November 1941)
- Generale di Brigata Ernesto Ferone (1 December 1941 - 1 March 1943)
- Generale di Divisione Ismaele Di Nisio (2 March 1943 - November 1943)
- Generale di Brigata Enrico Bianco di San Secondo (November 1943 - 21 September 1944)
