= 10th Self-propelled Field Artillery Group "Avisio" =

Inactive Italian Army artillery unit

- 10° Gruppo Artiglieria da Campagna Semovente "Avisio"
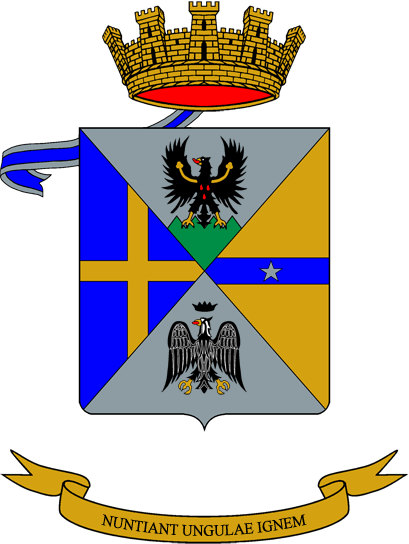
- Group coat of arms
- Active: 9 Sept. 1939 — 31 Aug. 1943; 20 Dec. 1975 — 31 Oct. 1986
- Country: Italy
- Branch: Italian Army
- Type: Artillery
- Role: Field artillery
- Part of: 4th Alpine Army Corps
- Garrison/HQ: Trento
- Motto: "Nuntiant ungulae ignem"
- Anniversaries: 15 June 1918 - Second Battle of the Piave River
- Decorations: 1x Silver Medal of Military Valor

Insignia
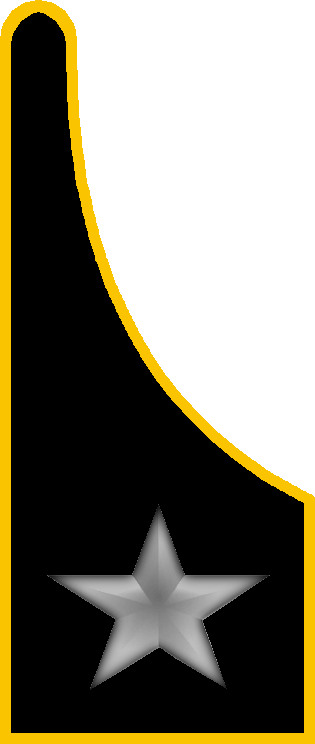
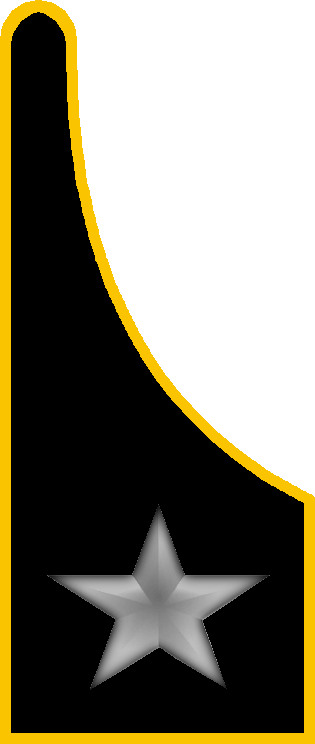
- Regimental gorget patches

The 10th Self-propelled Field Artillery Group "Avisio" (Italian: 10° Gruppo Artiglieria da Campagna Semovente "Avisio") is an inactive field artillery regiment of the Italian Army, which was based in Trento in Trentino. Originally an artillery grouping of the Royal Italian Army, the unit was last active from 1957 to 1986. The regimental anniversary falls, as for all Italian Army artillery units, on June 15, the beginning of the Second Battle of the Piave River in 1918.

== History ==
=== World War II ===
On 9 September 1939 the command and command unit of the 10th Army Artillery Grouping were formed 5th Army Artillery Regiment's depot in Verona. Initially the grouping consisted of the a command, a command unit, the XXIII and XXIV groups with 149/35 heavy guns, and the LVÍI Group with 152/13 howitzers, but when the grouping was assigned to the II Army Corps for the invasion of France in June 1940 it fielded the XIII, XLV, and XXIII groups with 105/28 cannons. From July to October 1940 the grouping was assigned to the V Army Corps.

On 2 April 1941 the grouping was again assigned to the V Army Corps for the Invasion of Yugoslavia. The grouping now consisted of the XVIII and XXIV with 49/35 A heavy guns and the LXVII Group with 152/13 howitzers. On 7 May 1942 the grouping ceded all its groups and received the following self-propelled anti-tank groups, which were equipped with 90/53 self-propelled guns:

- CLXI Self-propelled Anti-tank Group with 90/53 self-propelled guns — formed on 15 April 1942 by the depot of the 1st Army Corps Artillery Regiment
- CLXII Self-propelled Anti-tank Group with 90/53 self-propelled guns — formed on 21 April 1942 by the depot of the 2nd Army Corps Artillery Regiment
- CLXIII Self-propelled Anti-tank Group with 90/53 self-propelled guns — formed on 26 April 1942 by the depot of the 15th Army Corps Artillery Regiment

On the same date the grouping was rename to 10th Self-propelled Artillery Grouping. The grouping had been formed as reinforcement for the Italian 8th Army, which fought on the Eastern Front, but in November 1942 it was assigned to the 6th Army and transferred to Sicily. There the grouping changed its name to 10th Anti-tank Artillery Grouping.

In July 1943 the grouping fought against allied forces during the Allied invasion of Sicily. The grouping was heavily attrited in the fighting and the survivors were evacuated to mainland Italy, and sent to the depot of the 2nd Army Corps Artillery Regiment in Acqui to help form the 236th Self-propelled Anti-tank Regiment for the 136th Armored Legionary Division "Centauro". On 31 August 1943 the 10th Anti-tank Artillery Grouping was declared lost due to wartime events and the next day process began to form the 236th Self-propelled Anti-tank Regiment.

For its conduct in Sicily the grouping was awarded a Silver Medal of Military Valor, which was affixed to the grouping's flag and is depicted on the unit's coat of arms. The 236th Self-propelled Anti-tank Regiment was still in the process of being formed when it was disbanded by invading German forces after the announcement of the Armistice of Cassibile on 8 September 1943.

=== Cold War ===
On 1 November 1957 the III Self-propelled Group of the Self-propelled Anti-tank Horse Artillery Regiment moved from Milan to Bolzano, where it became an autonomous unit and was renamed III Self-propelled Field Artillery Group. The group was assigned to the IV Army Corps and consisted of a command, a command unit, and two batteries with self-propelled Sexton howitzers. On 10 February 1960 the group formed a third battery.

On 1 January 1964 the group absorbed the personnel of the CIII Self-propelled Anti-tank Group. The same year the group replaced its Sextons with self-propelled M7 Priest self-propelled guns. In 1973 the group moved from Bolzano to Trento.

As part of the 1975 army reform the III Self-propelled Group was renamed 10th Self-propelled Field Artillery Group "Avisio" on 20 December 1975. The group was named for the Avisio river, which flows into the Adige river near Trento, where the group was based. The group was assigned to the Artillery Command of the 4th Alpine Army Corps and consisted of a command, a command and services battery, and three batteries, which received M44 155 mm self-propelled howitzers to replace their M7 Priest self-propelled guns.

On 12 November 1976 the group was assigned the flag and traditions of the 10th Anti-tank Artillery Grouping by decree 846 of the President of the Italian Republic Giovanni Leone. At the time the group fielded 477 men (38 officers, 62 non-commissioned officers, and 377 soldiers).

In 1981 the group replaced it M44 self-propelled howitzers with M109G 155 mm self-propelled howitzers. On 10 October 1986 the flag of the 10th Anti-tank Artillery Grouping was returned to the Shrine of the Flags in the Vittoriano in Rom and on 31 October the 10th Self-propelled Field Artillery Group "Avisio" was disbanded.
