= Achille d'Havet =

Italian general (1888–1966)

- Born: 24 March 1888; Bologna, Kingdom of Italy
- Died: 21 April 1966 (aged 78); Rome, Italy
- Military career
- Allegiance: Kingdom of Italy
- Branch: Royal Italian Army
- Service years: 1908–1945
- Rank: Lieutenant General
- Commands: "Morbegno" Alpini Battalion; 152nd Infantry Regiment; 4th Alpine Division Cuneense; 47th Infantry Division Bari; 206th Coastal Division
- Conflicts: Italo-Turkish War; World War I; Battles of the Isonzo; Battle of Caporetto; Battle of the Piave river; World War II; Greco-Italian War; Allied invasion of Sicily
- Awards: Silver Medal of Military Valor (twice); Bronze Medal of Military Valor; War Merit Cross

Marquess Achille D'Havet (24 March 1888 in Bologna – 21 April 1966 in Rome) was an Italian general during World War II.

== Biography ==
=== Early life and World War I ===
Achille d'Havet was born on 24 March 1888 in Bologna, to Maria Baistrocchi and Marquis Giuseppe d'Havet, lieutenant of the Engineering Corps of the Royal Italian Army, at the time in service in the Artillery and Engineers Command of Bologna. Following in his father's footsteps, he entered the Military Academy of Modena on November 15, 1906, graduating as second lieutenant on September 4, 1908, and being assigned to the 3rd Alpini Regiment. On 7 September 1911 he became a lieutenant and shortly thereafter was reassigned to the "Fenestrelle" Alpini Battalion, which was then sent to Tripolitania shortly after the outbreak of the Italo-Turkish War. He distinguished himself during the war and in October 1912 he was awarded a Bronze Medal of Military Valor; He returned to Italy two months later and on 13 May 1914, on the eve of the First World War, he was promoted to captain and transferred to the "Susa" Alpini Battalion, receiving command of the 102nd Company, which he led in the occupation of Mount Stol and Kobarid respectively on 24 and 26 May 1915. On May 31 he distinguished himself in the assault on the Ursic ridge, which led to its capture from the Austro-Hungarians, and was therefore awarded a Silver Medal of Military Valor. On June 16 d'Havet participated in the bloody attack on Mount Krn, which involved the entire "Susa" Battalion; its conquest earned him a second silver medal. On 1 December 1915 he was recalled from the front and assigned to a staff officer training course; on 15 March 1916 he completed the course and returned to the front as Alpini staff officer attached to the headquarters of the Third Army. In August 1917 he was promoted to major and later that year he distinguished himself in the reorganization of the front on the Piave river after the crisis that followed the battle of Caporetto; in July 1918, he was awarded the War Merit Cross.

=== Interwar years ===
After the end of the war d'Havet left the Alpini corps, and on 10 April 1919 he was assigned to the command of the military division of Bologna; on 18 January 1920 he entered the Army War School in Turin, graduating on 13 November 1921 and being assigned to the command of the military division of Florence in December. On 7 December 1924 he returned to the Alpini corps and on 20 January 1925 he assumed command of the "Morbegno" Battalion, part of the 6th Alpini Regiment; from 1 November 1926 the battalion was transferred to the 5th Alpini Regiment. On 4 June 1926 he became a lieutenant colonel, and on 15 July 1927 he was appointed chief of staff of the command of the military division of Ravenna.

From March 16, 1931, he was chief of staff of the military division of Bari and on November 28, 1932, he was promoted to colonel and given command of the 152nd Infantry Regiment, "Sassari" Infantry Brigade, a post he held until September 16, 1935, when he was given command of the Army Corps of Milan. Meanwhile, on March 8, 1934, he had inherited his father's title of Marquis. At the end of the 1930s he was promoted to brigadier general and on 9 September 1939, eight days after the start of the Second World War, he assumed command of the 4th Alpine Division Cuneense.

=== World War II and later years ===
On 10 June 1940 the Kingdom of Italy entered the war alongside Nazi Germany and on that date General d'Havet left the command of the division and was placed at the disposal of the Army Chief of Staff, Marshal of Italy Pietro Badoglio. On 15 November he was chosen as the new commander of the 47th Infantry Division Bari, fighting on the Albanian front during the Greco-Italian War. The division fought fiercely in the Pindus region, in unfavorable environmental conditions and lacking vehicles, barely managing to stop the Greek advance. On February 18, 1941, d'Havet was recalled to his homeland and served for several months in the command of the territorial defense of Milan; on 15 November 1941 he was given command of the 206th Coastal Division, stationed in Sicily. He placed his headquarters in Ragusa and was responsible for the defense of the Pozzallo-Pachino-Noto-Cassibile-Syracuse line in case of enemy landing. On January 1, 1942, he was promoted to the rank of major general and was placed in the officers' reserve, but retained his post as commander of the 206th Coastal Division.

In the night between 9 and 10 July 1943, after heavy preparatory air raids, Allied troops landed on the south-eastern coast of Sicily; d'Havet attempted to oppose a coordinated resistance and locally managed to slow down the Allied advance towards the interior, but on 12 July he was captured by Canadian troops in Modica, along with his entire command. He was then taken, along with Major Stefano Argenziano and the mayor of Modica, Emanuele Giardina, to the headquarters of the 1st Canadian Division, where he met General Guy Simonds. D'Havet was the first general captured during the invasion of Sicily and the first general captured by Canadian troops during the war; General Oliver Leese, the commander of the British XXX Corps, wanted to celebrate this first and had him as a dinner guest before he was embarked on a ship bound for Algeria.

D'Havet was released from captivity at the end of 1944 and returned to Italy on 26 December of the same year, leaving active service in the Army from March 1, 1945; he then settled in Rome. On 1 July 1947 he received honorary promotion to Lieutenant General, and in 1954 he published an essay about mountain artillery and Alpine engineers. He died in his home on April 21, 1966, at the age of 78.
