= 10.4 cm Feldkanone M. 15 =

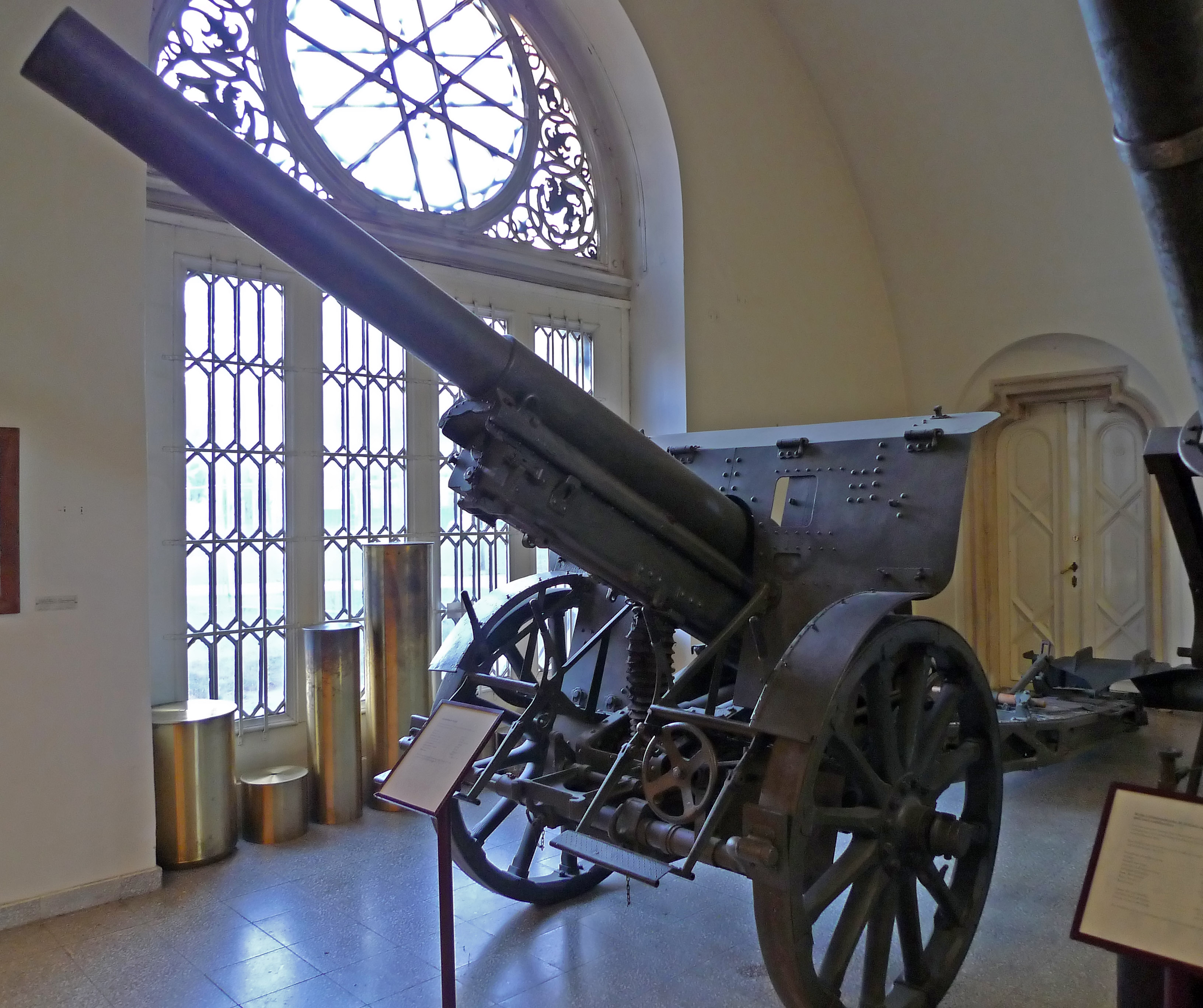
- 10.4 cm Feldkanone M. 15 at the Heeresgeschichtliches Museum Wien.
- Type: Field gun
- Place of origin: Austria-Hungary

Service history
- In service: 1916–1945
- Used by: Austria-Hungary; Nazi Germany; Kingdom of Italy; Second Polish Republic
- Wars: World War I World War II

Production history
- Designer: Škoda Works
- Designed: 1909-1914
- Manufacturer: Škoda Works
- Produced: 1914–1918
- No. built: 577?
- Variants: Cannone da 105/32

Specifications
- Mass: 3,030 kg (6,680 lb)
- Barrel length: 3.64 m (11 ft 11 in) L/35
- Shell: Separate loading, cased charge and projectile 104 x 580mm R 16.1 kilograms (35 lb 8 oz)
- Caliber: Italian variant: 105 mm (4.13 in)
- Carriage: box trail
- Elevation: -10° to +30°
- Traverse: 6°
- Rate of fire: 3-4 rpm
- Muzzle velocity: 668 m/s (2,191 ft/s)
- Maximum firing range: 12,700 m (13,900 yd)

The 10.4 cm Feldkanone M. 15 was a heavy field gun used by Austria-Hungary in World War I. It was derived from the successful 15 cm schwere Feldhaubitze M 14 modified to fire high-velocity 104-mm projectiles.

The 10.4 cm Feldkanone M.15 served the same role for the Austro-Hungarian Army as the 10 cm K 14 gun did for the Germans, but was 3 tons heavier and the barrel had to be removed in order to be transported by horse and wagon. Approximately 577 were produced by Škoda and MAVAG. These guns were deployed at all fronts, including Palestine. The M.15 was considered a good artillery piece, but the weight prohibited rapid deployment. The breech used a sliding wedge and they were equipped with spring reuperators and hydraulic recoil.

Because the gun was too heavy to be drawn by the usual field artillery team of six horses, for transport it broke down into the two loads, with the barrel being carried on a separate carriage.

An example of one of the transport wagons is preserved at Brisbane Grammar School in Queensland, Australia, which had been taken from the Ottoman Army at the Capture of Jenin in 1918 and was donated to the school in 1921 by Brigadier General Lachlan Chisholm Wilson, a former pupil. The barrel is mounted on its Rohrwagen or transport carriage rather than the gun carriage it would have been fired from. It was restored in 1996 by the South Queensland Logistics Group.

Four guns were used by Poland during the Polish-Soviet war.

Guns captured or turned over to Italy as reparations after World War I were taken into Italian service as the Cannone da 105/32 and were bored out to 105 mm to fit Italian ammunition. 260 M.14 and M.15 guns were recovered by the Italians after the Battle of Vittorio Veneto, of which 70 were scrapped. It was one of the principal Italian long-range guns in World War II and saw service in North Africa, Russia, and Sicily. It also saw use during the Second Italo-Ethiopian War. The Italians found that it did not compare favorably to the Canone de 105/28 due to the heavier weight, especially in Ukraine. Four guns were used by the Italian Social Republic in 1943. The German army gave captured weapons the designation 10.5cm K 320(i).

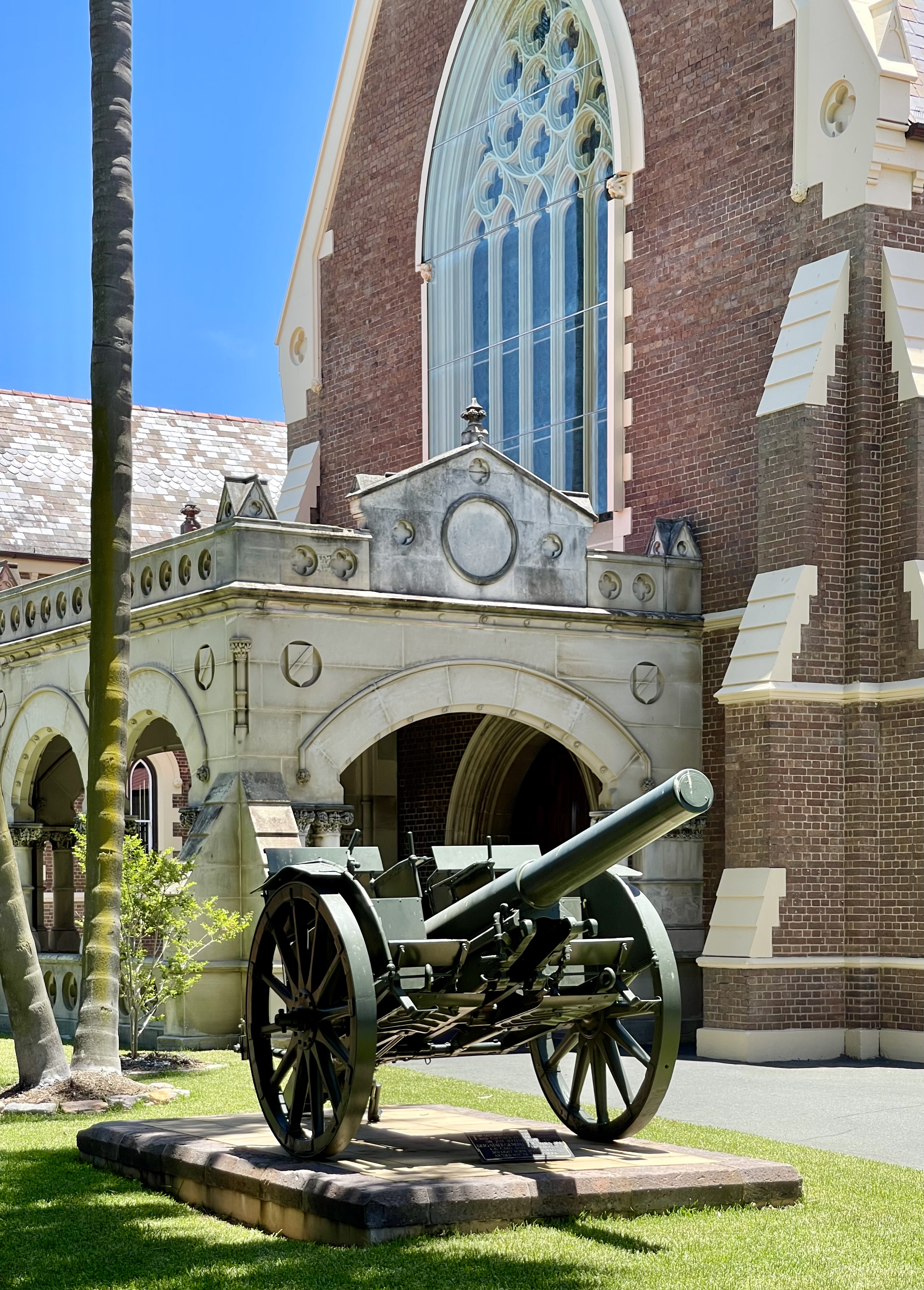
The ex-Ottoman M.15 barrel on its transport vehicle preserved at Brisbane Grammar School as a war memorial.

A rusting 10.4 cm Škoda was found in the Presanella mountains in the year 2000, where it supposed it was dueling an Italian 149/23 during the First World War. Found at 3171 meters altitude, the gun came completely out of the glacier in the very warm summer of 2003. Because it was located on a 45 degree slope, the risk of it sliding down was considered too great, so the gun was relocated by lifting it with a Superpuma helicopter.

== Bibliography ==
- Gander, Terry and Chamberlain, Peter. Weapons of the Third Reich: An Encyclopedic Survey of All Small Arms, Artillery and Special Weapons of the German Land Forces 1939-1945. New York: Doubleday, 1979 ISBN 0-385-15090-3
- Ortner, M. Christian. The Austro-Hungarian Artillery From 1867 to 1918: Technology, Organization, and Tactics. Vienna, Verlag Militaria, 2007 ISBN 978-3-902526-13-7
- Regio Esercito - Materiale bellico - Cannone da 104/32
