= Semovente da 90/53 =

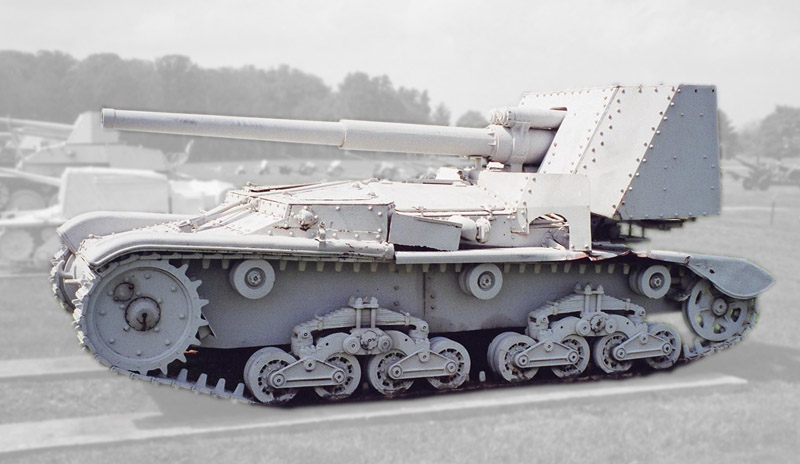
- Type: Self-propelled gun
- Place of origin: Italy

Service history
- In service: 1942–1943
- Used by: Italy; Nazi Germany
- Wars: World War II

Production history
- Manufacturer: Ansaldo
- Produced: 1942
- No. built: 30

Specifications
- Mass: 17 tonnes (37,500 lb)
- Length: 5.205 m (17 ft 1 in)
- Width: 2.20 m (7 ft 3 in)
- Height: 2.15 m (7 ft 1 in)
- Crew: 4 (commander, driver, two gun crew)
- Armour: 30 mm (1.57 in)
- Main armament: 90 mm (3.5 in) Cannone da 90/53; 8 rounds
- Engine: SPA 15-TM-41 eight-cylinder gasoline engine 145 hp (115 kW)
- Power/weight: 8.5 hp/t
- Suspension: leaf spring bogies
- Operational range: 200 km (124 mi)
- Maximum speed: 25 km/h (15.5 mph)

The Semovente da 90/53 was an Italian self-propelled gun and tank destroyer, used by the Italian and German Armies during World War II.

== Development ==
The Semovente da 90/53 was created by mounting a 90 mm Cannone da 90/53 anti-aircraft gun on top of an enlarged chassis of a M14/41 tank. Only 30 of these vehicles were produced, all in 1942.

The Semovente da 90/53 was primarily developed in response to demands by Italian forces on the Eastern Front for a vehicle-mounted anti-tank weapon that could take on Soviet T-34 and KV tanks. Italian armoured forces on the Eastern Front were equipped only with the L6/40 tank and Semovente 47/32 self-propelled gun; neither of these had the firepower to cope with the Soviet medium and heavy tanks. However, no Semovente da 90/53 were ever sent to the Eastern Front.

The major drawback of the Semovente da 90/53, as with many self-propelled gun types of World War II, was the open top and rear of the gun compartment, which left the gun crew exposed to shrapnel. The small ammunition capacity of the vehicle—eight rounds—was also a problem, necessitating the creation of special ammunition carriers out of Fiat L6/40 tanks, one accompanying each Semovente da 90/53 in the field. The L6 ammunition carrier carried 26 rounds, plus an additional 40 rounds in a towed trailer. Beside the standard Armour Penetrating rounds, it could fire Effetto Pronto, or HEAT rounds, which shaped charge could pierce 200mm armour plating at any range.

== Combat use ==
None were ever sent to the Eastern Front. In the North African Campaign, the Semovente da 90/53 proved to be an effective weapon and its long range was well suited to the flat and open desert terrain. 24 Semovente 90/53s saw service with the 10th Self-propelled Anti-tank Grouping against the Allies in Sicily during the Allied invasion in 1943.

== Surviving vehicle ==
Only one Semovente da 90/53 survived the war. Originally displayed at Aberdeen Proving Grounds (APG), as shown in the sidebar photo above, it was transferred the Fort Sill Field Artillery Museum in Fort Sill, Oklahoma in 2012. It has since been restored by the Fort Sill Directorate of Logistics (DoL) paint shop and is awaiting display. This surviving example has, "A fairly good history. It was assigned to the 163rd Support Artillery Group, was captured in Sicily in 1943 and shipped back to Aberdeen for evaluation."

== Sources ==
- Pejcoch, Ivo (2009). Obrněná technika 9 – Itálie, Španělsko 1919–1945. Prague: Ares. pp. 146–149. ISBN 978-80-86158-55-6.
