= Obice da 149/19 modello 37 =

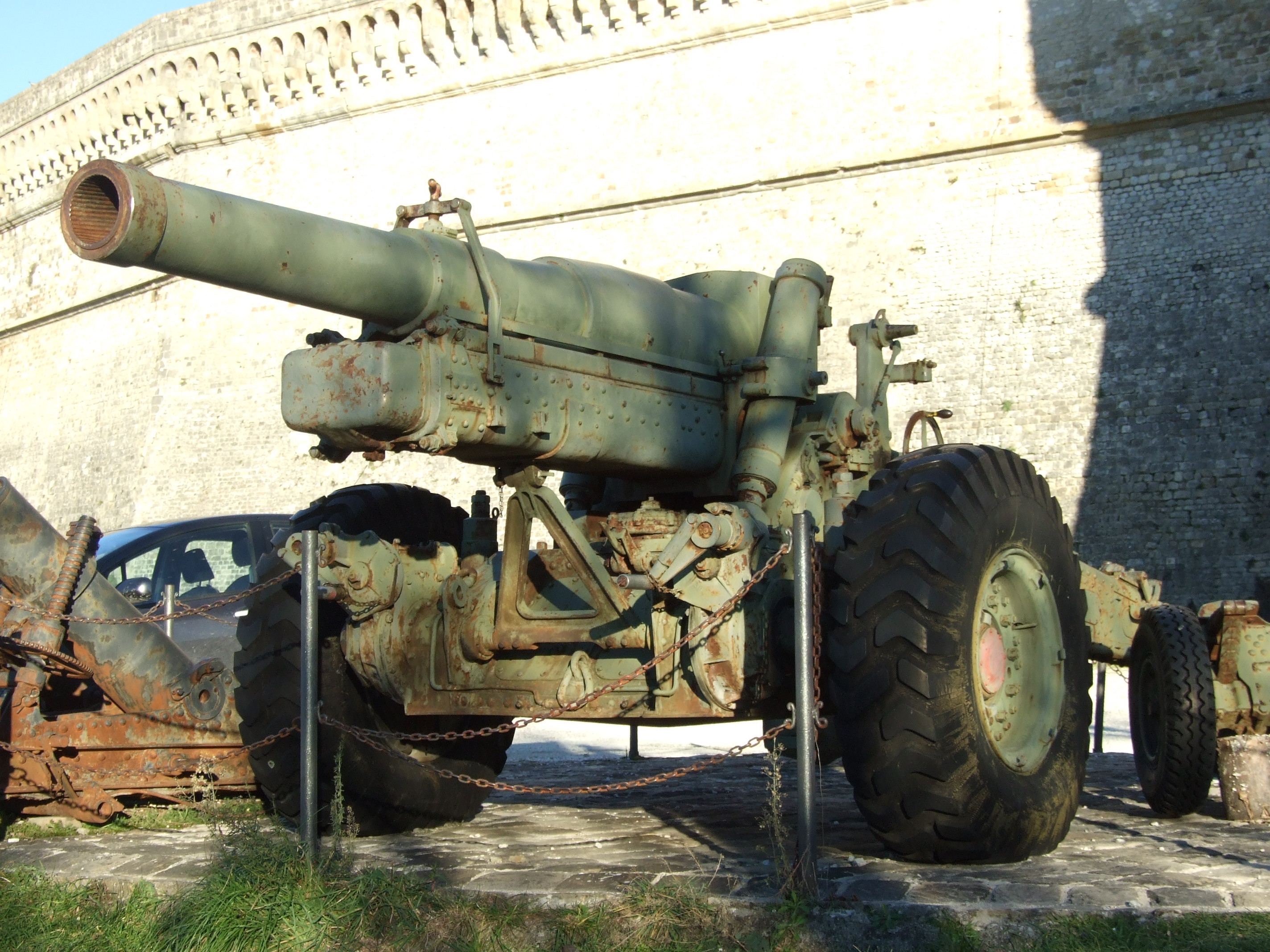
- An Obice da 149/19 modello 37, taken outside Forte di San Leo
- Type: Heavy howitzer
- Place of origin: Italy

Service history
- In service: 1939–1951
- Wars: World War II

Production history
- Designed: 1930–1939
- Manufacturer: Oto, Ansaldo
- Produced: c. 1939 – 1945

Specifications
- Mass: 5,500 kg (12,100 lb)
- Barrel length: 3.034 m (9 ft 11 in) L/20.4
- Shell: 42.55 kg (93 lb 13 oz)
- Caliber: 149.1 mm (5.87 in)
- Carriage: Split trail
- Elevation: +5° to +60°
- Traverse: 50°
- Muzzle velocity: 597 m/s (1,959 ft/s)
- Maximum firing range: 14,250 m (15,580 yd)

The Obice da 149/19 modello 37 was a heavy howitzer used by Italy during World War II. It was intended to replace Italy's assortment of World War I-era heavy howitzers, but its prolonged development and slow production hindered this plan. Despite orders for 1,392 weapons, only 147 had been built by September 1942. There were three models—the 37, 41, and 42—differing only in minor details. The standard tractor was the Trattore SPA TM 40. After the Italian surrender in 1943, the Germans continued its production with the designation 15 cm sFH 404(i). Despite having the same weight as the German 15 cm sFH 18, it had a superior range. The Italian army used it until 1974.

== Users ==
- Italy
- Germany
