= Obice da 149/12 =

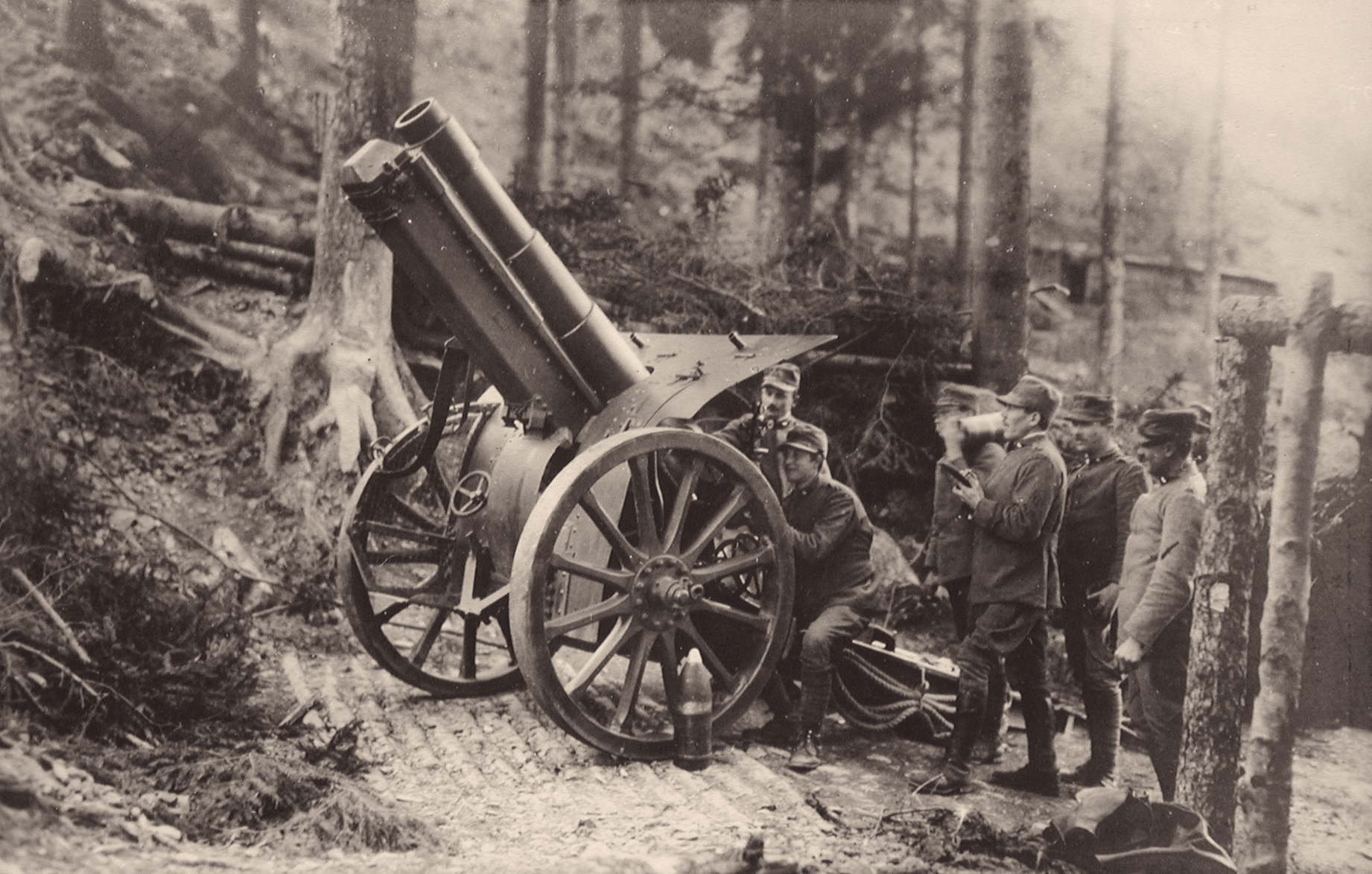
- A Modello 1914 in action during WWI.
- Type: Howitzer
- Place of origin: German Empire

Service history
- In service: 1914–1945
- Used by: Kingdom of Italy; Albania; Bulgaria
- Wars: World War I Second Italo-Ethiopian War; Spanish Civil War; World War II

Production history
- Designer: Krupp
- Designed: 1913
- Manufacturer: Ansaldo; Vickers-Terni
- Produced: 1914–1918
- No. built: 1,500
- Variants: 149/12 Modello 1916; 149/12 Modello 1918

Specifications
- Mass: 2,344 kg (5,168 lb)
- Length: 5.6 m (18 ft 4 in)
- Barrel length: 2.090 m (6 ft 10 in) L/12
- Width: Modello 1914: 1.48 m (4 ft 10 in); Modello 1916: 1.23 m (4 ft); Modello 1918: 1.5 m (4 ft 11 in)
- Shell: 149.1 x 112. 5 mmR Separate-loading, cased charge (7 charges)
- Shell weight: 38.9–42.34 kg (86–93 lb)
- Caliber: 149.1 mm (5.89 in)
- Breech: Horizontal sliding-block
- Recoil: Hydro-spring variable recoil
- Carriage: Box trail
- Elevation: Modello 1914-1916: −5° to +45° Modello 1918: −5° to +65°
- Traverse: 5°
- Rate of fire: 3 rpm
- Muzzle velocity: 300 m/s (980 ft/s)
- Effective firing range: 6.9 km (4.3 mi)
- Maximum firing range: 8.8 km (5.5 mi)

The Obice da 149/12 was an Italian howitzer produced under license in Italy by Ansaldo and Vickers-Terni which was used during World War I and World War II.

== History ==
After the independence and unification of Italy, the Italians were not self-sufficient in arms design and production. Foreign firms such as Armstrong, Krupp, Schneider, and Vickers all provided arms and helped establish local production of their designs under license.

One of the models that the Italian Army bought was the Krupp 15 cm sFH 13. With Italy's entry into the First World War in 1915 on the side of the Entente Powers Krupp only produced 112 pieces for the Italians. However, before the start of the war, Ansaldo and Vickers-Terni had acquired a production license for the 15 cm sFH 13 which was given Italian classification Obice da 149/12. Although the overall length of the barrel is 14 calibers in length the Italians classified it as 12 calibers because the Italian system does not count the gun's breech.

== Design ==
The 149/12 was a conventional artillery piece of the era with spoked wooden wheels with steel rims, a steel box trail carriage, a horizontal sliding-block breech, hydro-spring recoil system, a gun shield and used cased separate-loading charges and projectiles. The carriage had an open space behind the breech to accommodate high angles of elevation while the separate-loading system could accept up to 7 bags of propellant to vary velocity and range. The main difference between the models is their carriages and shields. Otherwise, their barrels remained the same. 1,500 guns of all three variants were produced.

=== Variants ===
- Obice da 149/12 Modello 1914 - This was the main production variant by Vickers-Terni and is nearly identical to the 15 cm sFH 13.
- Obice da 149/12 Modello 1916 - This version was produced by Ansaldo and used a narrower carriage 1.23 m (4 ft) and 1 m (3 ft 3 in) diameter wheels.
- Obice da 149/12 Modello 1918 - This version's carriage was modified to allow the wheels to extend to allow extra clearance for the breech to recoil. This combined with a modified recoil mechanism and elevation mechanism allowed up to 65° of elevation. This model can be identified by the two seats for the gun crew on the tail of the carriage and the new curved gun shield.

== Organization ==
A 149/12 battery consists of 4 howitzers, 4 Pavesi P4 tractors, 2 machine guns for close defense and 7 trucks. A 149/12 could be towed at 12–20 km/h (7.5–12.4 mph) and setup only took a few minutes.

== World War I ==
All three models of the 149/12 were widely used by the Italians during the First World War and a number survived to be used in the Spanish Civil War and Second World War.

== World War II ==
In addition to being used by Italy, the 149/12 was also exported to Albania and Bulgaria. It may have also been exported to Austria, Poland, and Spain. When Italy joined the Second World War in 1940, they had 580 Modello 1914 and 116 Modello 1918's in service, not having completed the replacement of this piece with the 149/13.

== Ammunition ==
- High-Explosive - Loaded with TNT or pentrite or picricum-tritol acid mixture (MAT) or binitrophenol-tritol mixture (MBT), 41.45 kg (91 lb 6 oz)
- Shrapnel - This is the same shell from the earlier 149/35, 42.34 kg (93 lb 5 oz)
- Common - This is the same shell from the earlier 149/35, cast iron and black powder.

== Photo Gallery ==
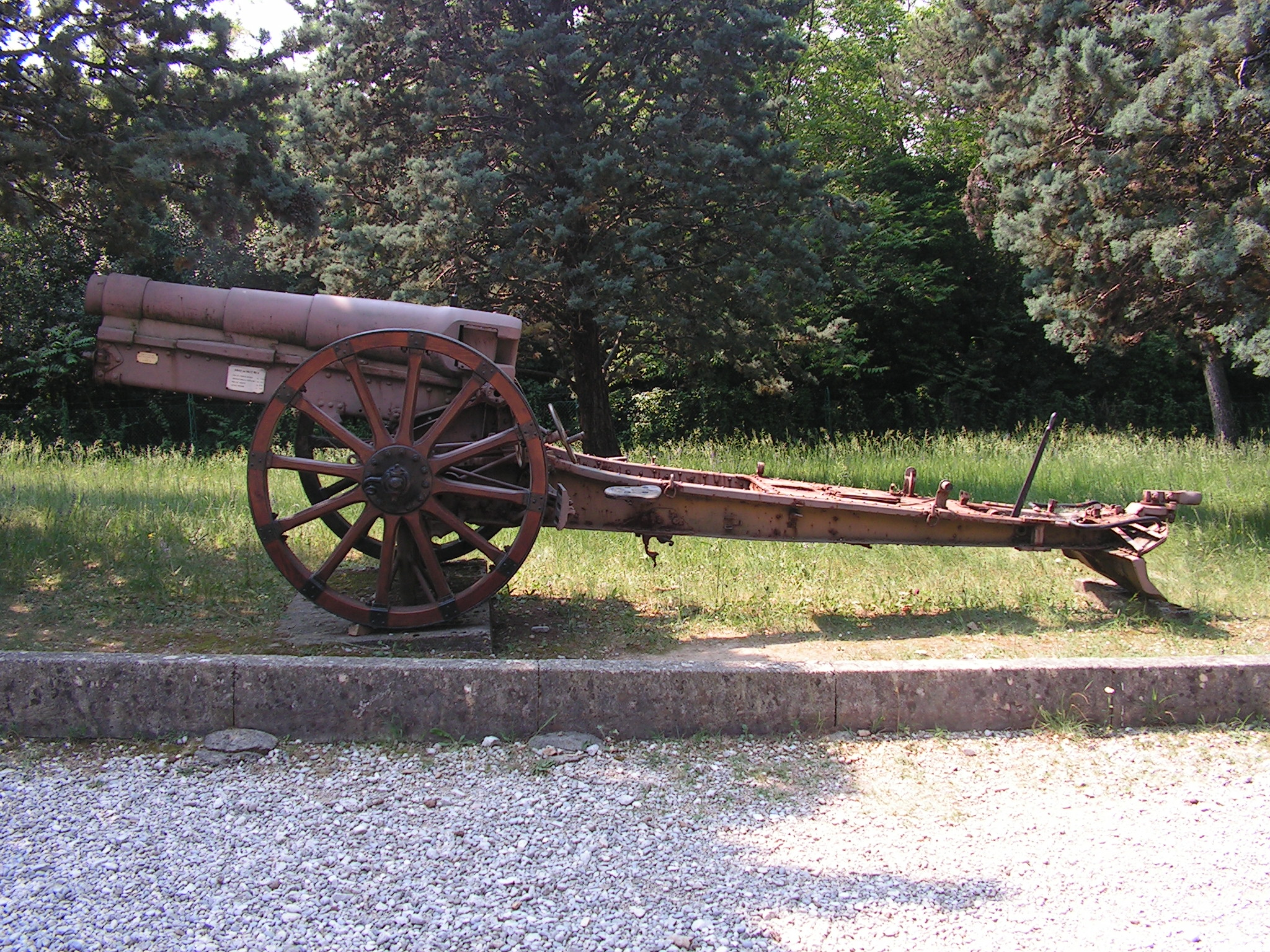
A surviving Modello 1914 without its gun shield.

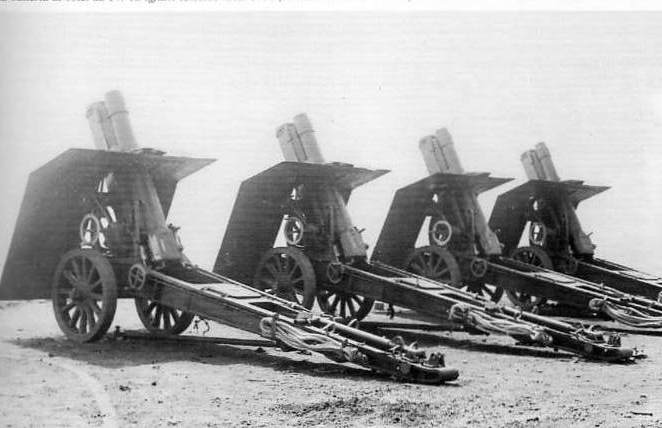
A battery of Modello 1916's.

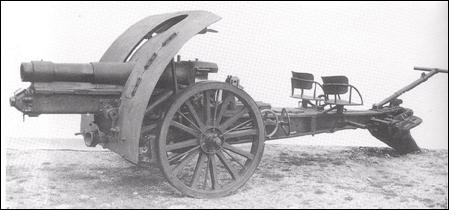
A Modello 1918.
