= 15 cm schwere Feldhaubitze M 14 =

Austria-Hungarian heavy howitzer used in World War I and World War II

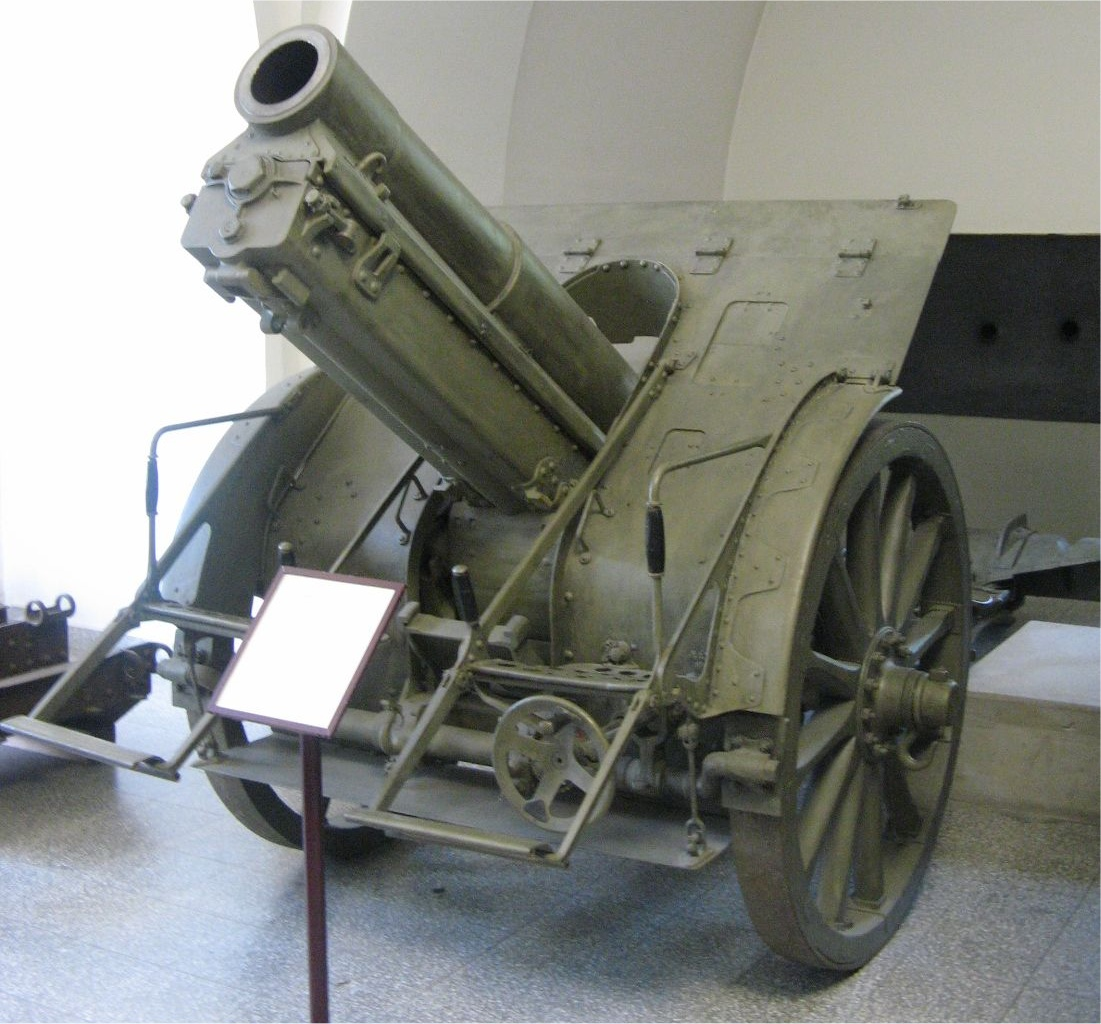
- An M.14 in the Heergeschichtlicheses Museum, Vienna
- Type: Heavy howitzer
- Place of origin: Austria-Hungary

Service history
- In service: 1914–1945
- Used by: Austria-Hungary; Austria; Czechoslovakia; Nazi Germany; Hungary; Italy; Romania; Slovakia
- Wars: World War I, World War II

Production history
- Designer: Škoda Works
- Designed: 1912–14
- Manufacturer: Škoda Works
- Produced: 1914–1918
- Variants: 15 cm schwere Feldhaubitze M 14/16

Specifications
- Mass: 2,765 kilograms (6,096 lb) (M 14/16)
- Barrel length: 2.09 m (6 ft 10 in) L/14 (M 14); 2.12 m (6 ft 11 in) L/14.1 (M 14/16)
- Shell: 41 kilograms (90 lb)
- Caliber: 149.1 mm (5.87 in)
- Breech: horizontal sliding-wedge
- Recoil: hydro-pneumatic variable recoil
- Carriage: box trail
- Elevation: -5° to +70° (M 14/16)
- Traverse: 6° (M 14/16)
- Rate of fire: 1-2 rpm
- Muzzle velocity: 336 m/s (1,102 ft/s) (M 14/16)
- Maximum firing range: 8,760 metres (9,580 yd) (M 14/16)

The 15 cm schwere Feldhaubitze M 14 was a heavy howitzer which served with Austria-Hungary during World War I.

== Design ==
The Škoda 15 cm M 14 was developed and built at the Škoda Works in Pilsen. Like other guns of the time it had two crew seats mounted on the Gun shield. It broke down into two loads for transport. The M 14 was modified to improve elevation and range as well as to strengthen the carriage as the M 14/16.

== Users ==
The successor states to the Austro-Hungarian Empire continued to use the M 14 and M 14/16 after the First World War. Postwar modifications were common to make it suitable for motor traction and to address other issues. Former enemies such as Romania and Italy also operated this series of guns whether they were captured, bought or received as war reparations after the Treaty of Versailles.

=== Austria ===
The M 14 and M 14/16 were kept in service by Austria. Those captured by Germany after the Anschluss were given the designation 15 cm sFH M.14(ö).

=== Czechoslovakia ===
The M 14 and M 14/16 were kept in service by Czechoslovakia. Czechoslovak weapons were known as the 15 cm hrubá houfnice vz. 14 and 15 cm hrubá houfnice vz. 14/16. The German designation for captured Czech guns was 15 cm sFH M.14(t).

=== Hungary ===
The M 14 and M 14/16 was kept in service by Hungary. Hungarian weapons were upgraded in 1935 by MAVAG and designated as M.14/35. Later in 1939 another batch of guns were updated and designated as M.14/39.

=== Italy ===
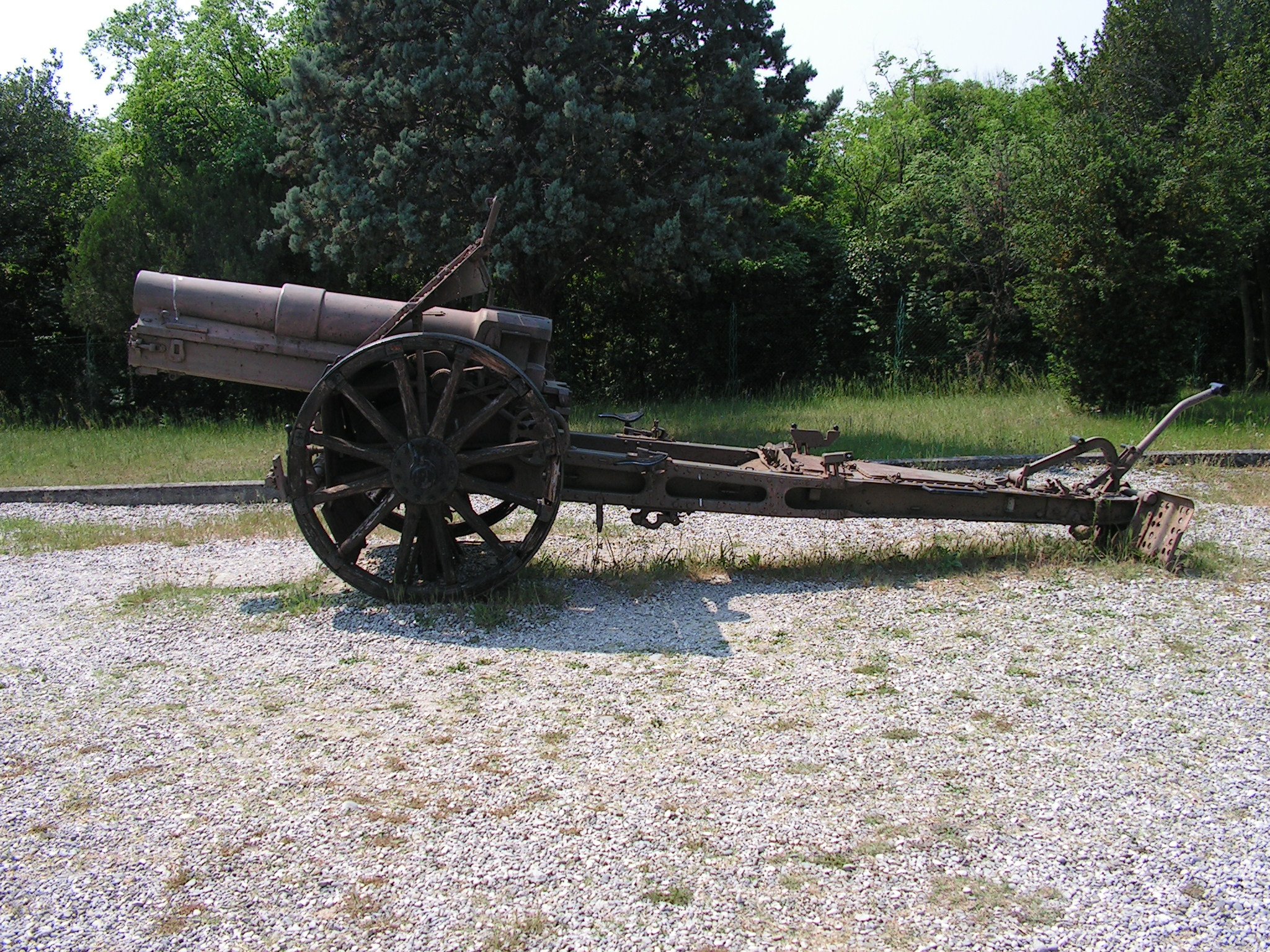
An Italian Obice 149/13

M 14 and M 14/16 howitzers captured by Italy during the war or received as reparations, were put into service with the designation Obice da 149/13. Some 490 were on hand in 1939 and weapons captured by the Germans after the Italians changed sides in 1943 were used as the 15 cm sFH 400(i) and 15 cm sFH 401(i).

== Bibliography ==
- Chamberlain, Peter & Gander, Terry. Heavy Artillery. New York: Arco, 1975 ISBN 0-668-03898-5
- Gander, Terry and Chamberlain, Peter. Weapons of the Third Reich: An Encyclopedic Survey of All Small Arms, Artillery and Special Weapons of the German Land Forces 1939-1945. New York: Doubleday, 1979 ISBN 0-385-15090-3
- Ortner, M. Christian. The Austro-Hungarian Artillery From 1867 to 1918: Technology, Organization, and Tactics. Vienna, Verlag Militaria, 2007 ISBN 978-3-902526-13-7
