= Field Artillery Regiment "a Cavallo" =

Active Italian Army horse artillery unit

- Reggimento Artiglieria Terrestre "a Cavallo"
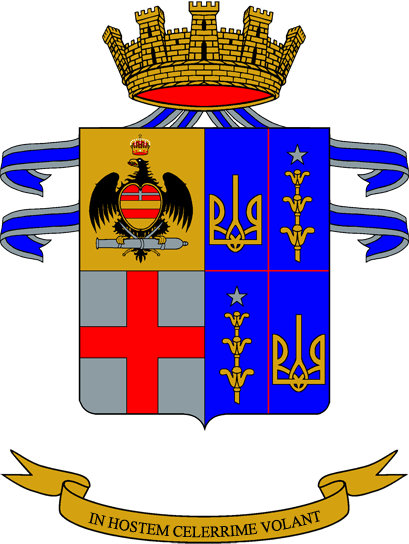
- Regimental coat of arms
- Active: 1 November 1887 – 8 Sept. 1943; 20 Nov. 1946 – today
- Country: Italy
- Branch: Italian Army
- Part of: Cavalry Brigade "Pozzuolo del Friuli"
- Garrison/HQ: Vercelli
- Motto: "In hostem celerrime volant"
- Anniversaries: 15 June 1918 – Second Battle of the Piave River
- Decorations: 4× Silver Medals of Military Valor; 1× Gold Medal of Public Health Merit; Temporarily assigned: 1× Gold Medal of Military Valor; 1× Silver Medal of Military Valor; 1× Bronze Medal of Military Valor

Insignia
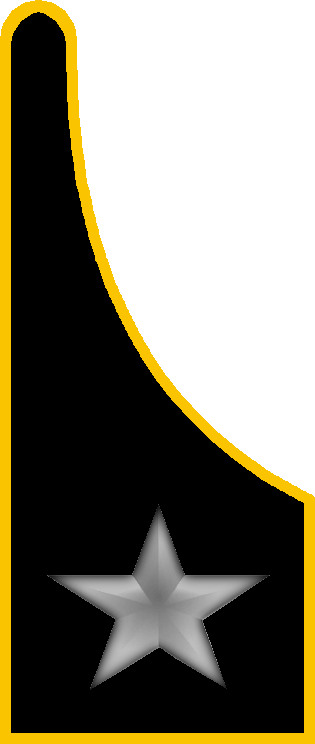
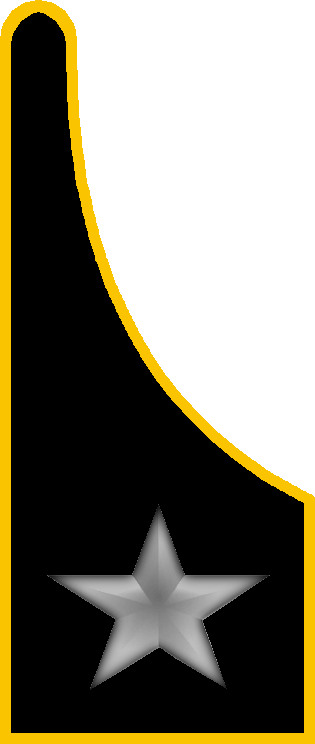
- Regimental gorget patches

The Field Artillery Regiment "a Cavallo" (Italian: Reggimento Artiglieria Terrestre "a Cavallo") is a field artillery regiment of the Italian Army. The regiment carries and maintains the traditions of all Royal Sardinian Army, Royal Italian Army and Italian Army horse artillery units and includes a historic section with horse-drawn guns. The Royal Sardinian Army formed the first horse batteries in 1831, which in 1887 were merged to create the Horse Artillery Regiment. In World War I the regiment's batteries were assigned to the Royal Italian Army's four cavalry divisions, which fought on the Italian front.

In 1934 the regiment helped form the fast artillery regiments for the army's 1st and 2nd cavalry divisions, while the regiment itself was assigned to the 3rd Cavalry Division "Principe Amedeo Duca d'Aosta". In 1941 the three fast artillery regiment were sent to Libya to fight in the Western Desert campaign, during which all three were destroyed. Back in Italy the horse artillery groups were used to form the 3rd Horse Artillery Regiment, which was assigned to the 3rd Cavalry Division "Principe Amedeo Duca d'Aosta". The division was assigned to the Italian Expeditionary Corps in Russia and departed for the Eastern front in July 1942. The division and regiment were destroyed during the Red Army's Operation Little Saturn. The regiment was reformed after World War II in Milan and during the Cold War it was assigned to the 3rd Army Corps.

Today the regiment is based in Vercelli in Piedmont and Milan in Lombardy and assigned to the Cavalry Brigade "Pozzuolo del Friuli". The regiment provides two batteries to the Italian Armed Forces' National Sea Projection Capability. The regimental anniversary falls, as for all Italian Army artillery regiments, on June 15, the beginning of the Second Battle of the Piave River in 1918.

== History ==
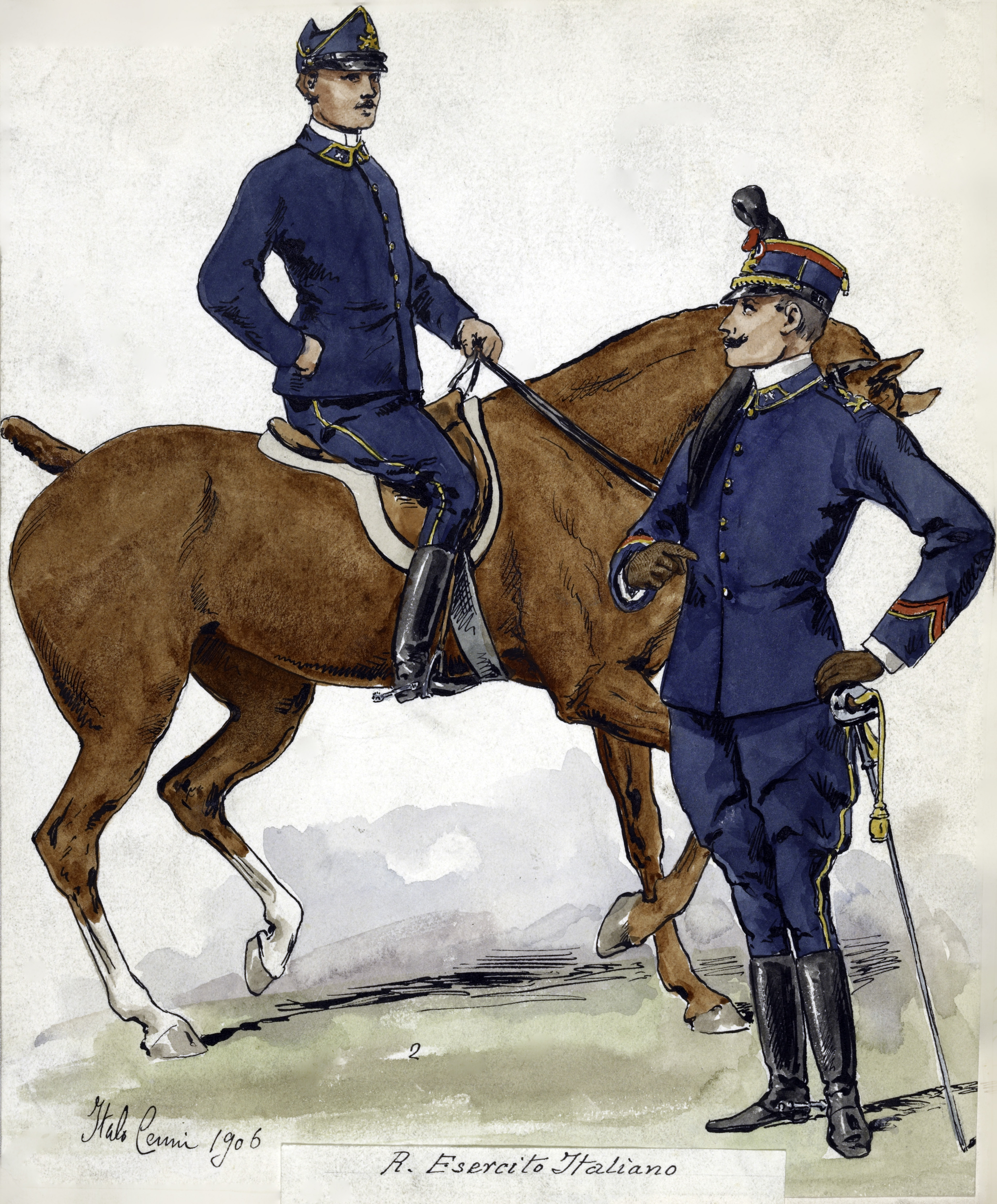
Horse Artillery Regiment non-commissioned officer on foot & soldier on horse in the regiment's uniform

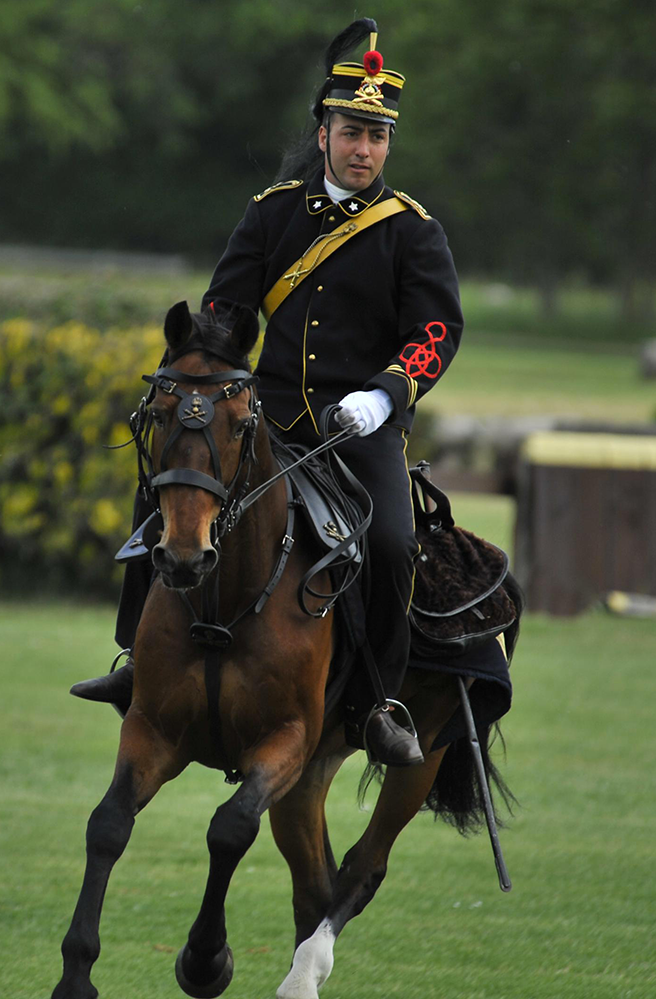
Field Artillery Regiment "a Cavallo" officer in the regiment's ceremonial uniform 2017

On 8 April 1831, the Royal Sardinian Army formed the 1st and 2nd horse batteries in Venaria Reale to support the army's cavalry regiments. Each battery consisted of four officers, seven non-commissioned officers, eleven corporals, 178 enlisted men and 210 horses. On 23 August of the same year, the two batteries were assigned to a newly formed Horse Artillery Brigade. In 1848, during the First Italian War of Independence, the 3rd Horse Battery was formed, which, like the two others, participated in the war. In 1850 the horse batteries were assigned to the 1st Field Regiment and the 3rd Horse Battery was reorganized as a field battery. The remaining two batteries participated in the Second and Third Italian War of Independence, before being reorganized as field artillery batteries in October 1871.

On 1 January 1884, the 8th Field Artillery Regiment in Verona formed two horse artillery brigades with two batteries each. On 1 November 1887, the 8th Field Artillery Regiment ceded the two horse artillery batteries to help from the Horse Artillery Regiment in Milan. The new regiment consisted of a staff, three horse artillery brigades of two batteries each, and a train brigade of four train companies and a depot.

In 1895–96 the regiment provided 3 officers and 101 enlisted men for units deployed to Eritrea for the First Italo-Ethiopian War. In 1910 the brigades were renamed groups and a fourth horse artillery group was formed. In 1911–12 the regiment provided 11 officers and 377 enlisted for units deployed to Libya for the Italo-Turkish War.

=== World War I ===
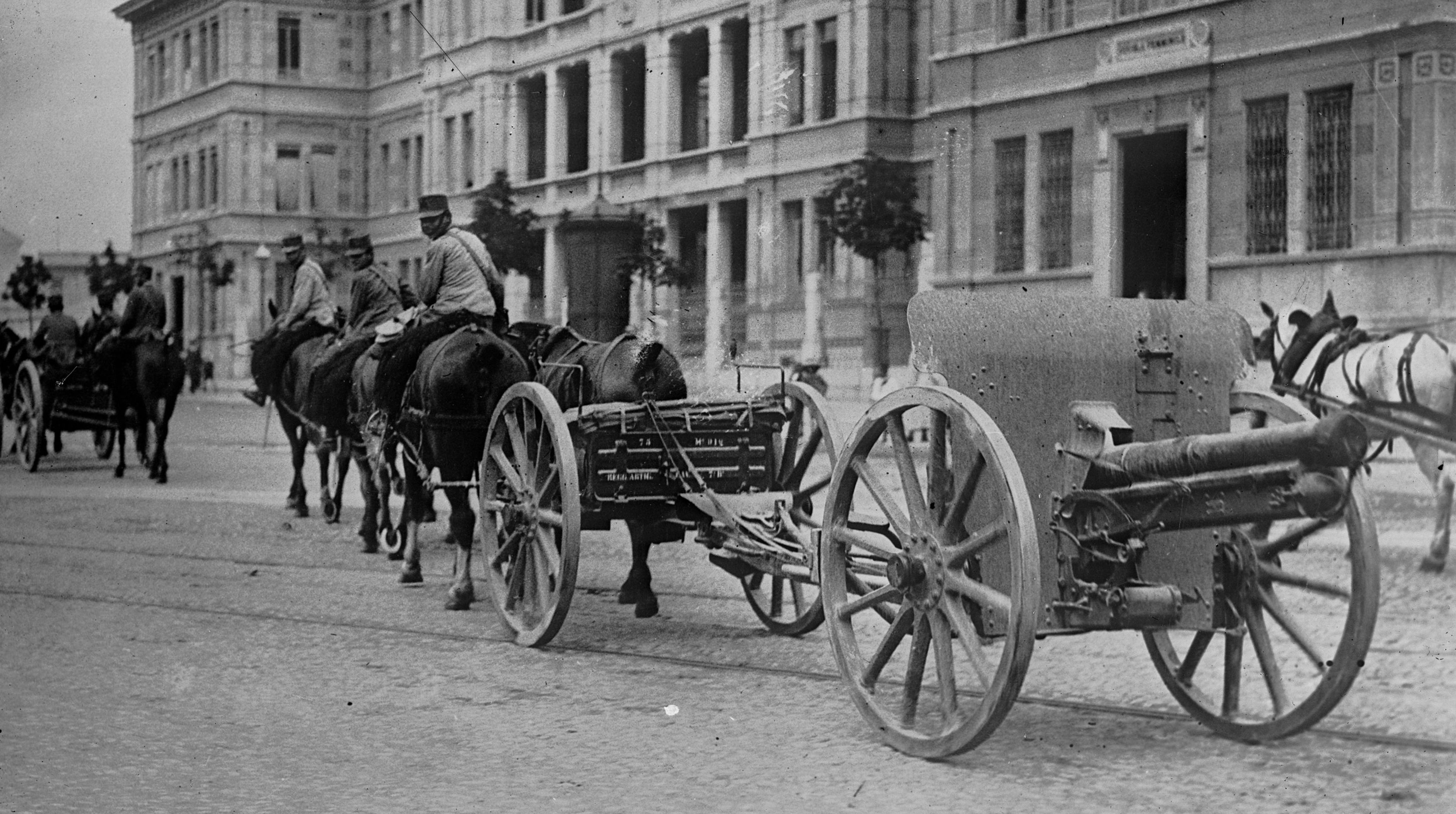
Horse Artillery Regiment 75/27 mod. 12 gun in May 1915

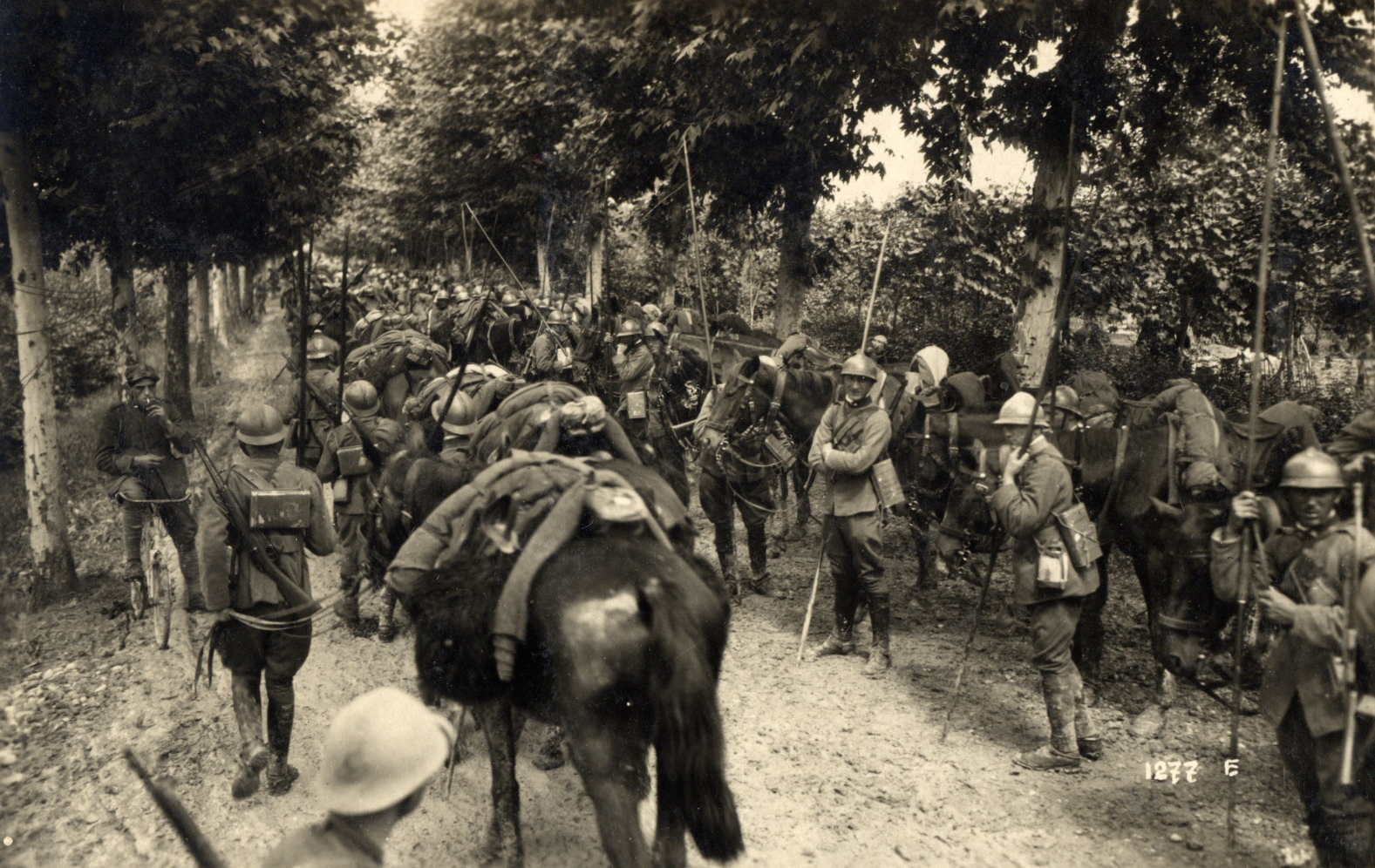
Italian cavalry troops during the retreat to the Piave river

At the outbreak of World War I the regiment consisted of a command, four horse artillery groups of two batteries each, two train companies, and two artillery motorists companies. On 24 May 1915, the day Italy declared war on Austria-Hungary, the four horse artillery groups were assigned to the army's four cavalry divisions.

In May and June 1915 the groups fought on Monte Sei Busi and in Monfalcone. Afterwards the batteries were used for coastal and anti-aircraft defence near Aquileia, San Giorgio di Nogaro and on the lower Tagliamento river. In 1916 the groups fought on Mount Košnik and then in the Seventh, Eighth, and Ninth Battle of the Isonzo. In 1917 the I Horse Artillery Group was deployed on Črni hrib. The II Horse Artillery Group was Opatje Selo and from May to August the group was in training with the 2nd Cavalry Division. Afterwards the group was deployed in Gorizia and at Tolmin. The III Horse Artillery Group held position on Nad Bregom, at Nova Vas and Opatje Selo. The IV Horse Artillery Group was in Opatje Selo, in Monfalcone and Gorizia. In May and June the groups fought in the Tenth Battle of the Isonzo at Kostanjevica na Krasu and at Hudi Log and in August in the Eleventh Battle of the Isonzo at Korita na Krasu.

In October 1917 at the outset of the Battle of Caporetto the regimental command, together with the I and III groups, was on the Karst plateau. The II Group in Tolmin and the IV Group was in Solkan. On 24 October the II Group was surrounded by Austrian forces and forced to surrender. The regimental command and the remaining groups retreated to the Tagliamento river, where they fought a delaying action at San Vito al Tagliamento.

Between the Tagliamento and the Piave river, the I and III groups supported the cavalry divisions, which covered the retreat of the Italian armies. Once the Piave was reached and the First Battle of the Piave commenced, the batteries were deployed to the fought on the Montello hill.

Afterwards the II Group was reformed and in June 1918 the group fought against Austro-Hungarian forces, which had crossed the Piave at Monastier di Treviso during the Second Battle of the Piave River. After that battle the groups were deployed on the Asiago plateau. In October 1918 the groups participated in the Battle of Vittorio Veneto and on 29 October the cavalry divisions forded the Piave started the pursuit of the retreating enemy.

=== Interwar years ===
In July 1920 the regiment was reorganized as a motorized regiment and renamed Auto-carried Artillery Regiment. The regiment consisted of one horse artillery group and five auto-carried artillery groups. In 1923 the regiment was again reorganized and renamed Horse Artillery Regiment. It consisted now of two horse artillery groups and two auto-carried artillery groups. In 1926 the I and II horse artillery groups were equipped with 75/27 mod. 12 guns, and the III and IV auto-carried artillery groups with 75/27 mod. 11 field guns. On 14 February 1928 the regiment formed two new horse artillery groups and transferred its two auto-carried artillery groups to the 1st Heavy Field Artillery Regiment and the 4th Heavy Field Artillery Regiment.

In June 1934 the regiment disbanded its IV Horse Artillery Group and on 1 October of the same year the regiment transferred its III Horse Artillery Group to the Light Artillery Regiment and its II Horse Artillery Group to the newly formed 2nd Artillery Regiment for Cavalry Division. On the same day the Light Artillery Regiment transferred two of its motorized groups with 75/27 mod. 11 field guns to the Horse Artillery Regiment respectively the 2nd Artillery Regiment for Cavalry Division. On the same date, 1 October 1934, the Light Artillery Regiment was renamed 1st Artillery Regiment for Cavalry Division and the Horse Artillery Regiment was renamed 3rd Artillery Regiment for Cavalry Division. Each of the three artillery regiments consisted of a command, a command unit, a horse artillery group with 75/27 mod. 12 guns, and a motorized group with 75/27 mod. 11 field guns. The three regiments were assigned to the army's three cavalry divisions, which on 1 January 1935 received new names and consequently also the three artillery regiments were renamed:

- 1st Fast Artillery Regiment "Eugenio di Savoia", assigned to the 1st Cavalry Division "Eugenio di Savoia"
- 2nd Fast Artillery Regiment "Emanuele Filiberto Testa di Ferro", assigned to the 2nd Cavalry Division "Emanuele Filiberto Testa di Ferro"
- 3rd Fast Artillery Regiment "Principe Amedeo Duca d'Aosta", assigned to the 3rd Cavalry Division "Principe Amedeo Duca d'Aosta"

To complete their new organization each of the three regiments received on 1 March 1935 a motorized group with 105/28 cannons: the 1st Fast Artillery Regiment "Eugenio di Savoia" received the II Group with 105/28 cannons from the 11th Heavy Field Artillery Regiment, the 2nd Fast Artillery Regiment "Emanuele Filiberto Testa di Ferro" received the II Group with 105/28 cannons from the 6th Heavy Field Artillery Regiment, and the 3rd Fast Artillery Regiment "Principe Amedeo Duca d'Aosta" received the II Group with 105/28 cannons from the 3rd Heavy Field Artillery Regiment. In June 1937 the regiment formed an anti-aircraft battery with 20/65 mod. 35 anti-aircraft guns and in August of the same year the regiment returned the III Motorized Group with 105/28 cannons to the 3rd Heavy Field Artillery Regiment, and replaced it on 1 December with a newly formed III Motorized Group with 75/27 mod. 11 field guns.

=== World War II ===
==== Western Desert ====
On 10 June 1940, the day Italy entered World War II, the three cavalry division were in Italy. On 9 December 1940 the British Western Desert Force commenced Operation Compass, which led to the collapse of the Italian 10th Army in Eastern Libya. To reinforce the Italian units in Libya the three fast artillery regiments with their motorized groups were sent to Libya:

- the 1st Fast Regiment arrived in Libya in February 1941 and was attached to the 27th Infantry Division "Brescia"
- the 2nd Fast Regiment arrived in Libya in January 1941 and was attached from August of the same year to the German 90th Light Infantry Division
- the 3rd Fast Regiment arrived in Libya in February 1941 and was attached until May 1941 to the 17th Infantry Division "Pavia", then from May 1941 to March 1942 to the 133rd Armored Division "Littorio", and then from March 1942 to the 60th Infantry Division "Sabratha"

All three regiments were destroyed in Africa during the Western Desert campaign: the 2nd Fast Regiment was declared lost due to war time events on 17 January 1942 after having covered the Axis retreat at Halfaya and Bardia during the British Operation Crusader. The 1st Fast Regiment and 3rd Fast Regiment, together with their divisions, were destroyed during the Second Battle of El Alamein and declared lost due to war time events on 25 November 1942.

For its conduct and sacrifice in North Africa the 3rd Fast Regiment "Principe Amedeo Duca d'Aosta" was awarded a Silver Medal of Military Valor, which was affixed on the regiment's flag and is depicted on the regiment's coat of arms. The 1st Fast Regiment "Eugenio di Savoia" was awarded a Gold Medal of Military Valor and a Bronze Medal of Military Valor for its conduct and sacrifice in North Africa, which are both assigned temporarily to the Field Artillery Regiment "a Cavallo" and affixed on the regiment's flag.

==== Eastern front ====
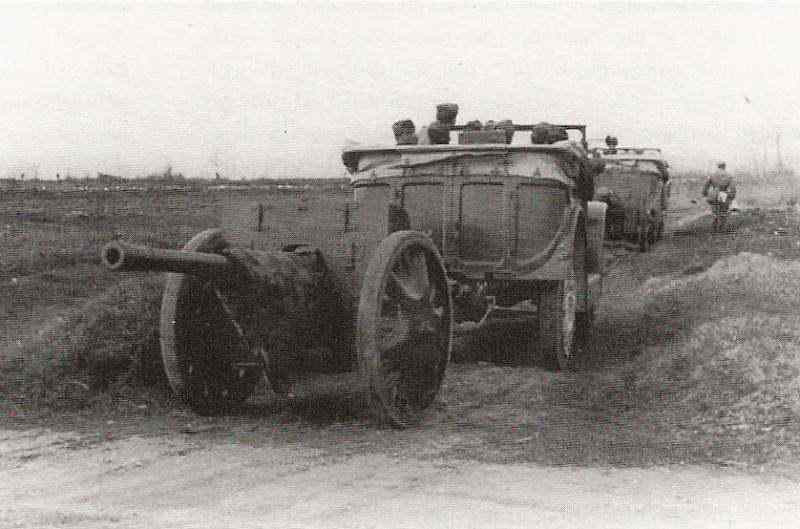
201st Motorized Artillery Regiment 75/32 mod. 37 field gun in the Soviet Union 1942

On 1 July 1941 the three horse artillery groups of the three fast artillery regiments were used to form the 3rd Horse Artillery Regiment, which was again assigned to the 3rd Cavalry Division "Principe Amedeo Duca d'Aosta". The division was assigned to the Italian Expeditionary Corps in Russia, which departed Italy the for Ukraine in July 1941. In Ukraine the corps fought in the battles of Stalino and Horlivka in the Donbas. On 29 October 1941 the regiment was renamed Horse Artillery Regiment.

On 1 January 1942 the depot of the 1st Fast Artillery Regiment "Eugenio di Savoia" in Udine began with the formation of the 201st Motorized Artillery Regiment, which consisted of a command, a command unit, and three motorized groups with 75/32 mod. 37 field guns. In July 1942 regiment was sent to the Soviet Union when the Italian Expeditionary Corps in Russia was expanded to 8th Army.

On 16 December 1942 the Red Army commenced Operation Little Saturn, which destroyed most of the Italian 8th Army. The remnants of the 8th Army were repatriated in April 1943.

In spring 1943 the depot of the regiment in Gallarate began to rebuild the Horse Artillery Regiment. By August the regiment joined the 3rd Cavalry Division "Principe Amedeo Duca d'Aosta", which was garrisoned in the Emilia-Romagna. The regiment was disbanded by invading German forces after the announcement of the Armistice of Cassibile on 8 September 1943.

For its conduct and sacrifice on the Eastern front the Horse Artillery Regiment was awarded three Silver Medals of Military Valor, which were affixed to the regiment's flag and are depicted on the regiment's coat of arms. The 201st Motorized Artillery Regiment was awarded a Silver Medal of Military Valor for its conduct and sacrifice on the Eastern front, which is assigned temporarily to the Field Artillery Regiment "a Cavallo" and affixed on the regiment's flag.

=== Cold War ===
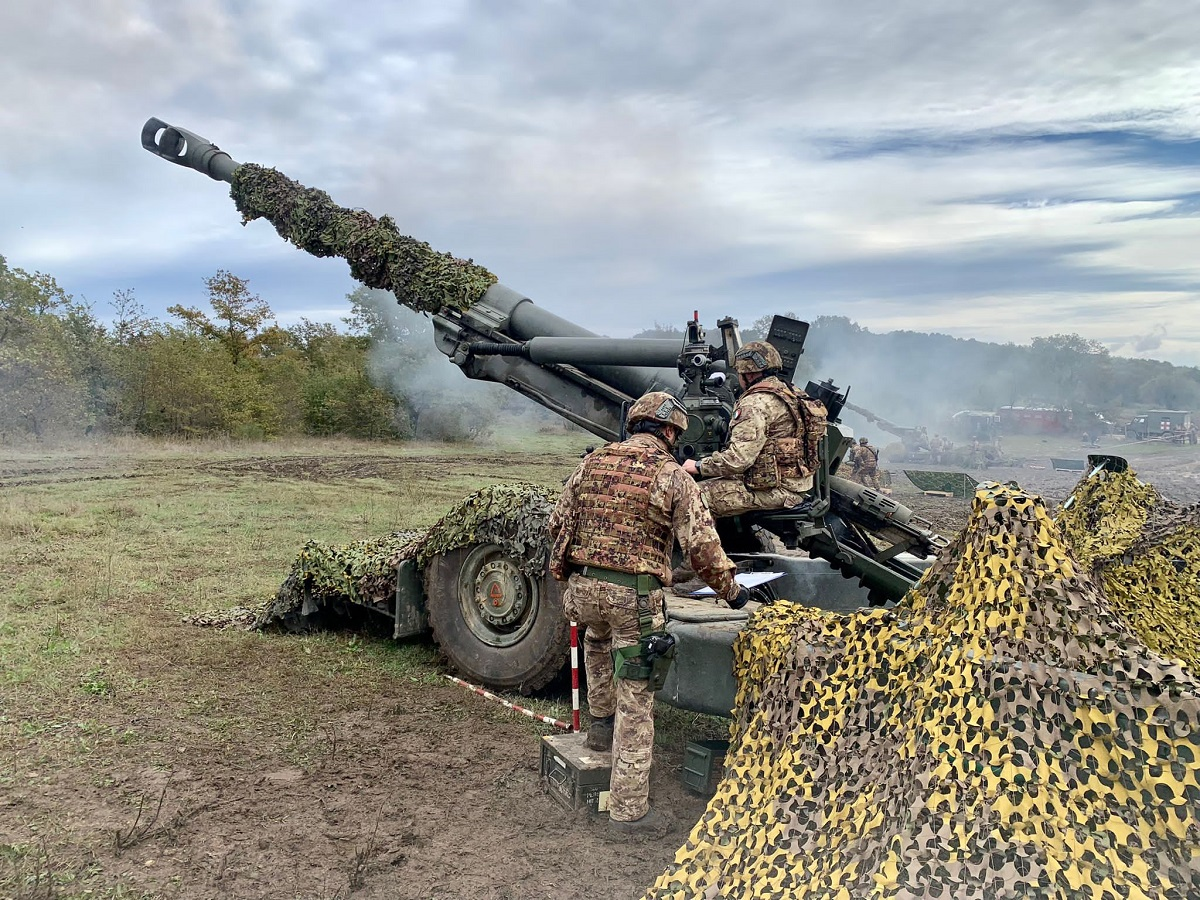
Field Artillery Regiment "a Cavallo" FH-70 towed howitzer

The Horse Artillery Regiment was reformed on 20 November 1946 in Milan with the II and III with QF 25-pounder field guns transferred from the 11th Field Artillery Regiment. The regiment then proceeded to form the I Group, which was initially a reserve formation. The regiment was assigned to the Infantry Division "Legnano". On 1 January 1951 the Infantry Division "Legnano" included the following artillery regiments:

- Infantry Division "Legnano", in Bergamo
  - Horse Artillery Regiment, in Milan
  - 11th Field Artillery Regiment, in Cremona
  - 27th Anti-tank Field Artillery Regiment, in Milan
  - 2nd Light Anti-aircraft Artillery Regiment, in Mantua

On 28 March 1951 the regiment consisted of command, a command unit, and the I and II groups with QF 25-pounder field guns. On 30 June 1951 the regiment received the I Light Anti-aircraft Group with 40/56 autocannons from the 2nd Light Anti-aircraft Artillery Regiment, which on 1 July was reorganized as 2nd Heavy Anti-Aircraft Artillery Regiment. Upon entering the regiment the anti-aircraft group was renumbered as III Group.

On 1 April 1952 the regiment received the IV and V motorized anti-tank groups with QF 17-pounder anti-tank guns from the 27th Army Corps Anti-tank Artillery Regiment. On 1 August 1953 the two anti-tank groups received new equipment and were grouped together in the Self-propelled Anti-tank Sub-grouping, with the new designations CVII Anti-tank Group with M10 tank destroyers and CVIII Anti-tank Group with M18 Hellcat tank destroyers. On 1 January 1954 the regiment disbanded the I and II groups and the III Group received with Sexton self-propelled howitzers. On the same date the regiment left the Infantry Division "Legnano" and was assigned to the III Territorial Military Command and renamed Army Corps Self-propelled Horse Artillery Regiment.

In May 1955 the Self-propelled Anti-tank Sub-grouping was placed in reserve status. On 1 April 1957 the regiment changed its name to Self-propelled Anti-tank Horse Artillery Regiment and on 30 October of the same year the regiment transferred its III Self-propelled Group with Sexton self-propelled howitzers from Milan to Bolzano, where the group joined the IV Army Corps the next day. As replacement the regiment received the XXI Self-propelled Anti-tank Artillery Group with M36 tank destroyers from the IV Army Corps. In 1958 the regiment formed the XXII Self-propelled Anti-tank Group with M36 tank destroyers, which remained a reserve formation for all of its existence. On 15 December 1960 the regiment inaugurated the Military Equestrian Center.

On 1 September 1961 the regiment disbanded its anti-tank groups and formed three self-propelled artillery groups with M7 Priest self-propelled guns. Consequently the regiment was renamed Self-propelled Horse Field Artillery Regiment. Already on 20 April 1964 the regiment was reorganized again: that day the 27th Heavy Self-propelled Field Artillery Regiment moved its flag from Milan to Udine, where the flag supplanted the flag of the 155th Self-propelled Anti-tank Artillery Regiment, whose flag was transferred to the Shrine of the Flags in the Vittoriano in Rome. The same day the 27th Heavy Self-propelled Field Artillery Regiment's three groups with M44 self-propelled howitzers joined the Horse Artillery Regiment, which disbanded its own groups and changed its name to Heavy Self-propelled Horse Field Artillery Regiment. On 1 August of the same year then name of the regiment was shortened to Horse Artillery Regiment.

On 31 January 1966 the regiment was allowed to form a horse-drawn battery with two 75/27 mod. 12 guns for representative and historic purposes.

As part of the 1975 army reform the 52nd Heavy Artillery Regiment was disbanded on 30 September 1975 and the next day the II Group with M59 155 mm field guns and IV Group with M115 203 mm howitzers of the disbanded regiment joined the Horse Artillery Regiment. At the same time the Horse Artillery Regiment's III Group replaced its M44 self-propelled howitzers with M59 155mm field guns. After the reform the regiment consisted of the following units:

- Horse Artillery Regiment, in Milan
  - Command and Services Battery
  - 1st Group with M44 self-propelled howitzers
  - 2nd Group with M44 self-propelled howitzers
  - 3rd Group with M59 155 mm field guns
  - 4th Group (Reserve) with M59 155mm field guns, in Cremona
  - 5th Group with M115 203 mm howitzers, in Cremona
  - Horse Battery with 75/27 mod. 12 guns

In 1980 the 3rd and 4th groups were disbanded and the 5th renumbered as 3rd. In October of the same year the regiment began to receive M109G self-propelled howitzers and by spring 1981 the regiment consisted of the I, II, and III groups with M109G self-propelled howitzers. In 1986 the III Group was placed in reserve status.

On 16 February 1991 the 131st Heavy Field Artillery Group "Vercelli" with FH70 towed howitzers and the 12th Artillery Specialists Group "Biella" entered the regiment. On 28th February of the same year the III Group, which had been a reserve formation since 1986, was disbanded, and on 2 May the regiment's 1st and 2nd groups replaced their M109G self-propelled howitzers with FH70 towed howitzers, while on the same date the 131st Heavy Field Artillery Group "Vercelli" exchanged its FH70 with M109G.

On 29 July 1992 the 9th Self-propelled Field Artillery Group "Brennero" of the Armored Brigade "Centauro" was disbanded and the next day the 131st Self-propelled Field Artillery Group "Vercelli" exited the Horse Artillery Regiment and entered the reformed 131st Self-propelled Field Artillery Regiment "Centauro". The reformed regiment incorporated the personnel and M109L self-propelled howitzers of the disbanded Brennero group. On 29 September of the same year the 12th Artillery Specialists Group "Biella" was disbanded and the next day the 1st and 2nd groups of the Horse Artillery Regiment were merged. On the same day, 30 September 1992, the regiment formed an anti-aircraft battery. The regiment now consisted of a command, a command and services battery, the 1st Group with FH70 towed howitzers, an anti-aircraft battery, and the Horse Battery with 75/27 mod. 12 guns.

=== Recent times ===
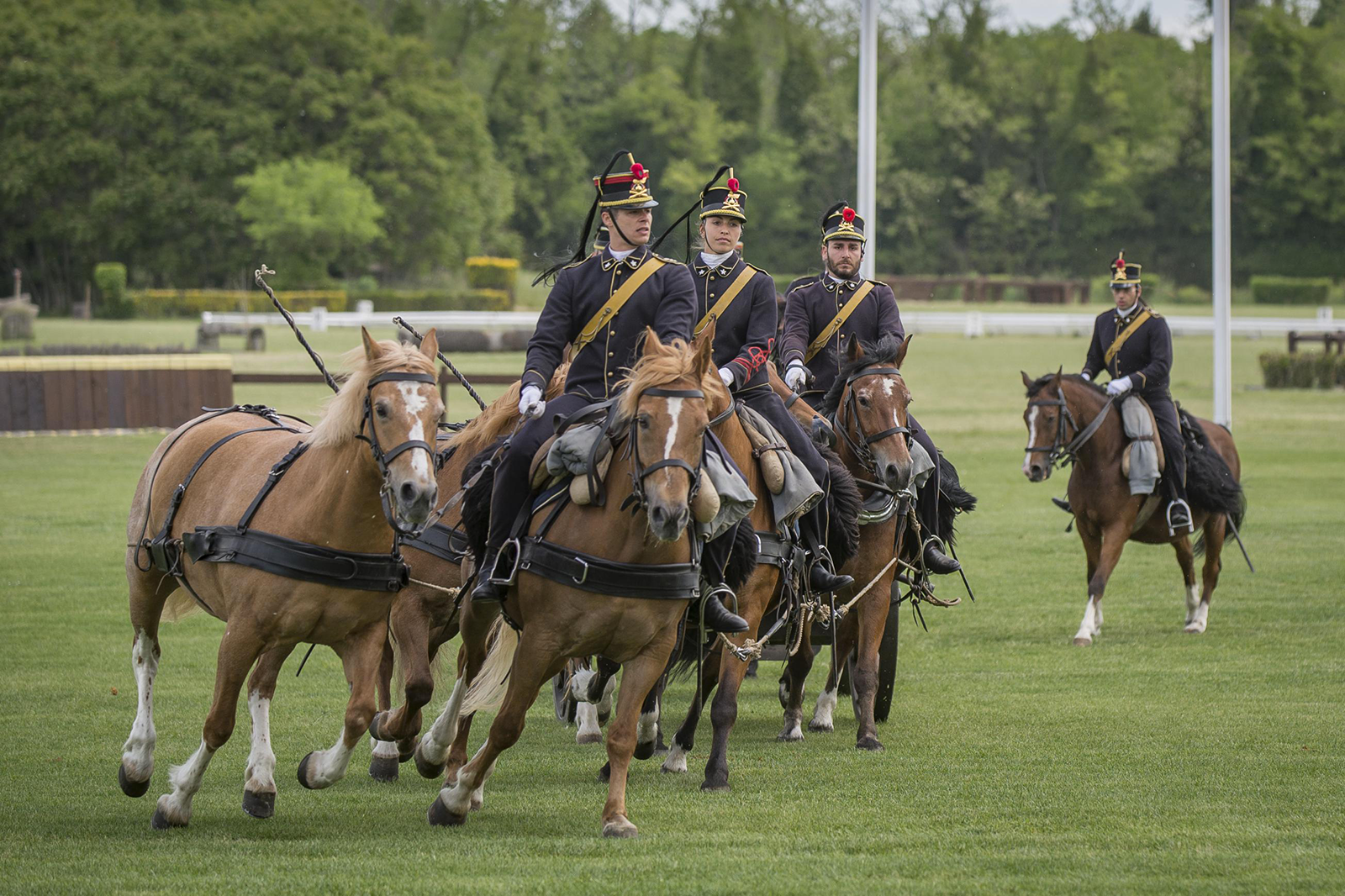
Field Artillery Regiment "a Cavallo" troops positioning a 75–27 mod. 12 gun

On 16 September 1996, the regiment was transferred from the 3rd Army Corps to the Support Units Command "Legnano". On 1 December 1997, the regiment was transferred from the Support Units Command "Legnano" to the army's Artillery Grouping. In 2000 the regiment was renamed Field Artillery Regiment "a Cavallo". On 1 January 2005 the regiment was transferred from the Artillery Brigade, which had been formed on 1 January 2002, to the Cavalry Brigade "Pozzuolo del Friuli". On 8 August 2016 the regimental command and 1st Howitzer Group moved from Milan to Vercelli, while the 2nd Horse Group remained in Milan.

== Organization ==
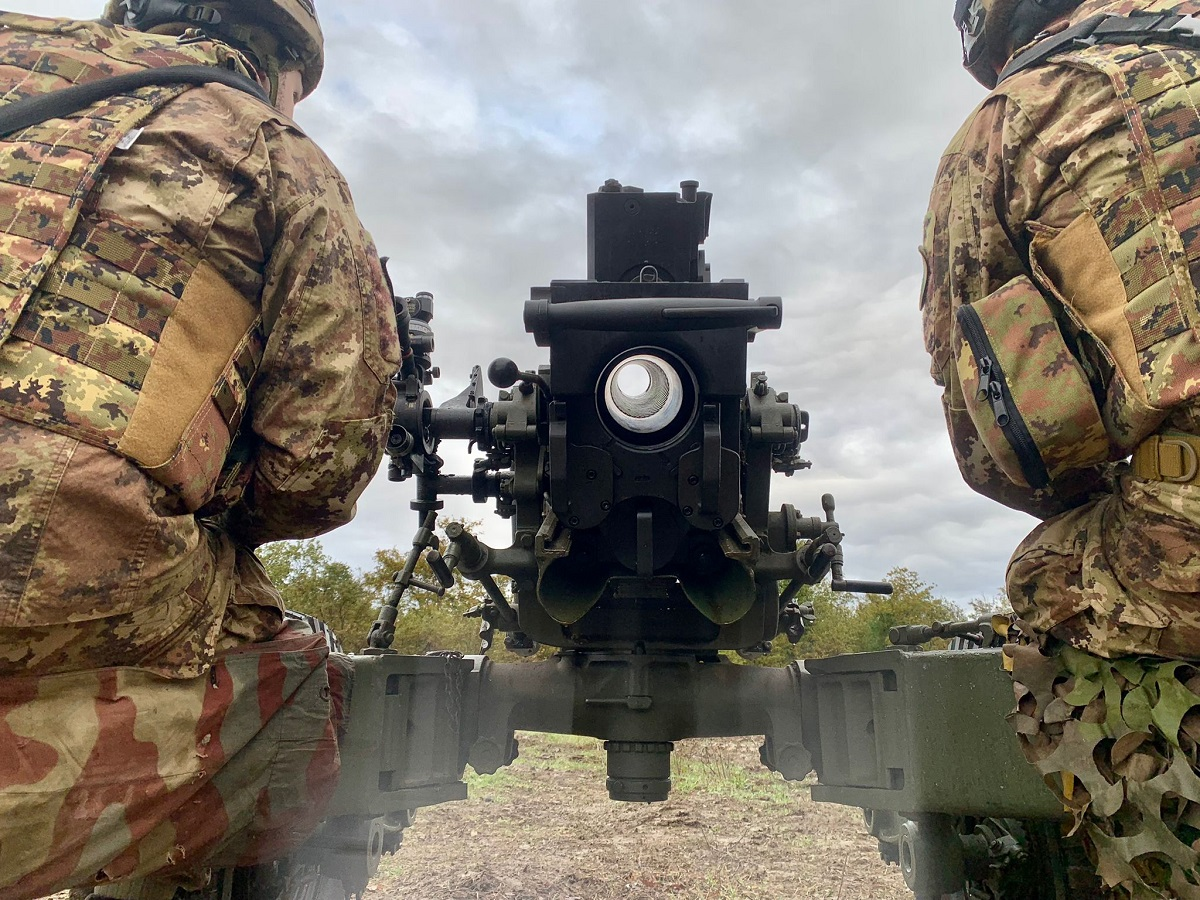
Field Artillery Regiment "a Cavallo" M56 105 mm pack howitzer

As of 2025 the Field Artillery Regiment "a Cavallo" is organized as follows:

- Field Artillery Regiment "a Cavallo", in Vercelli
  - Command and Logistic Support Battery, in Vercelli
  - Surveillance, Target Acquisition and Tactical Liaison Battery, in Vercelli
  - 1st Howitzer Group, in Vercelli
    - 1st Battery
    - 2nd Battery
    - 3rd Battery
    - Fire and Technical Support Battery
  - 2nd Horse Group, in Milan
    - Historic Section
    - Horse Batteries Military Equestrian Center
    - Horse Batteries Museum

The regiment is equipped with FH-70 towed howitzers and M56 105 mm pack howitzers.

== Historic Section ==
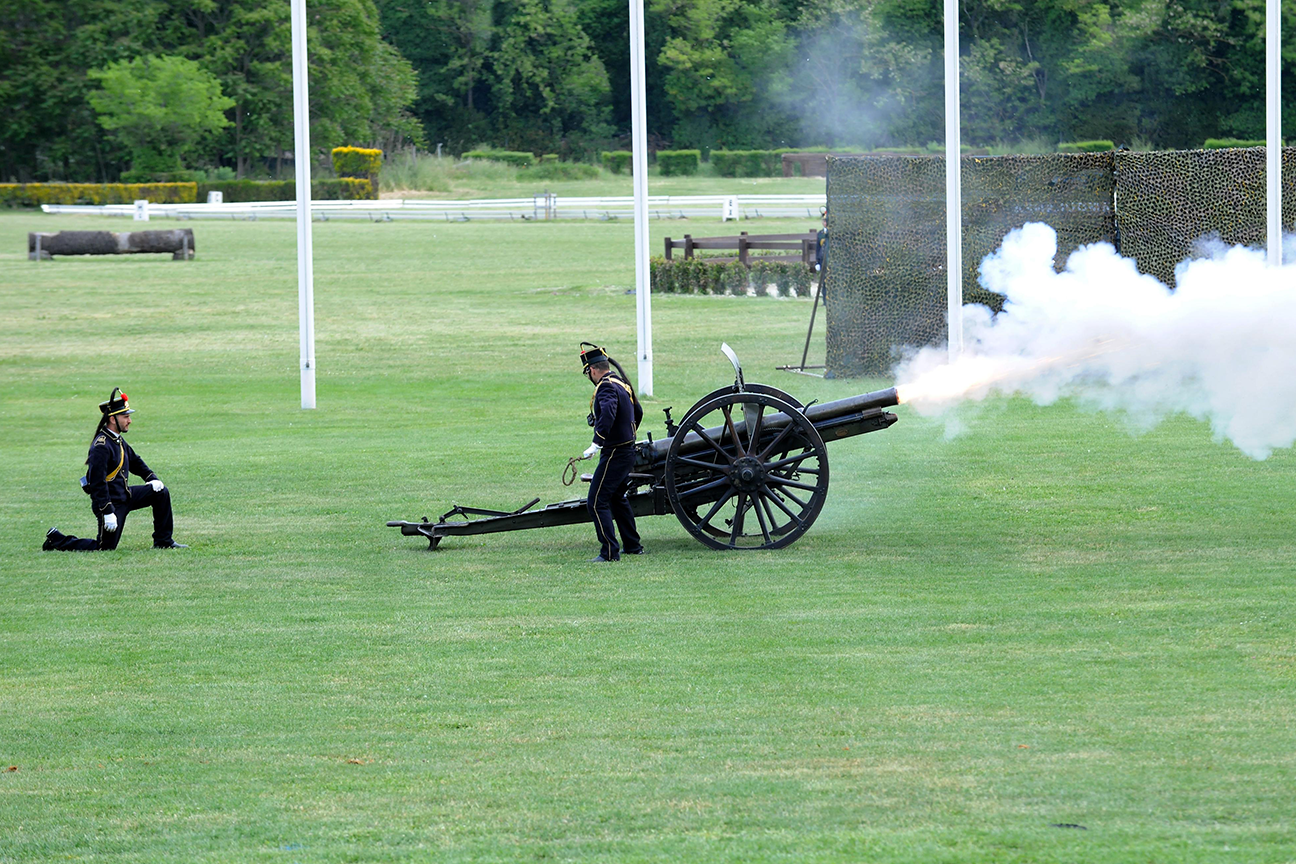
Field Artillery Regiment "a Cavallo" troops firing a 75/27 mod. 12 gun

The Historic Section in Milan was formed in 1966 and is equipped with two 75/27 mod. 12 guns. Each gun is attached up to a limber that is towed by a team of six Freiberger horses. Three gunners ride the three horses to the left, while the piece is preceded by the gun chief and followed by four gunners, all on horseback, for a total of eleven horses and eight gunners. The Historic Section uniform's are the same model as worn by the regiment's troops in 1887, the year the regiment was founded.

== Unit decorations ==
The three Silver Medals of Military Valor awarded to the 3rd Horse Artillery Regiment for its conduct and sacrifice on the Eastern front and the Silver Medal of Military Valor awarded to the 3rd Fast Artillery Regiment "Principe Amedeo Duca d'Aosta" for its conduct and sacrifice in the Western Desert Campaign are affixed to the flag of the Field Artillery Regiment "a Cavallo" and depicted on the regiment's coat of arms. The Field Artillery Regiment "a Cavallo" also was assigned temporarily the Gold Medal of Military Valor and the Bronze Medal of Military Valor awarded to 1st Fast Artillery Regiment "Eugenio di Savoia" for that regiment's conduct and sacrifice in the Western Desert Campaign, as well as the Silver Medal of Military Valor awarded to the 201st Motorized Artillery Regiment for its conduct and sacrifice on the Eastern front. The latter three medals are affixed to the flag of the Field Artillery Regiment "a Cavallo", but not depicted on the regiment's coat of arms.

== See also ==
- Cavalry Brigade "Pozzuolo del Friuli"
