= Municipality of Miren-Kostanjevica =

Municipality of Slovenia

Municipality of Miren-Kostanjevica Občina Miren - Kostanjevica
- Municipality
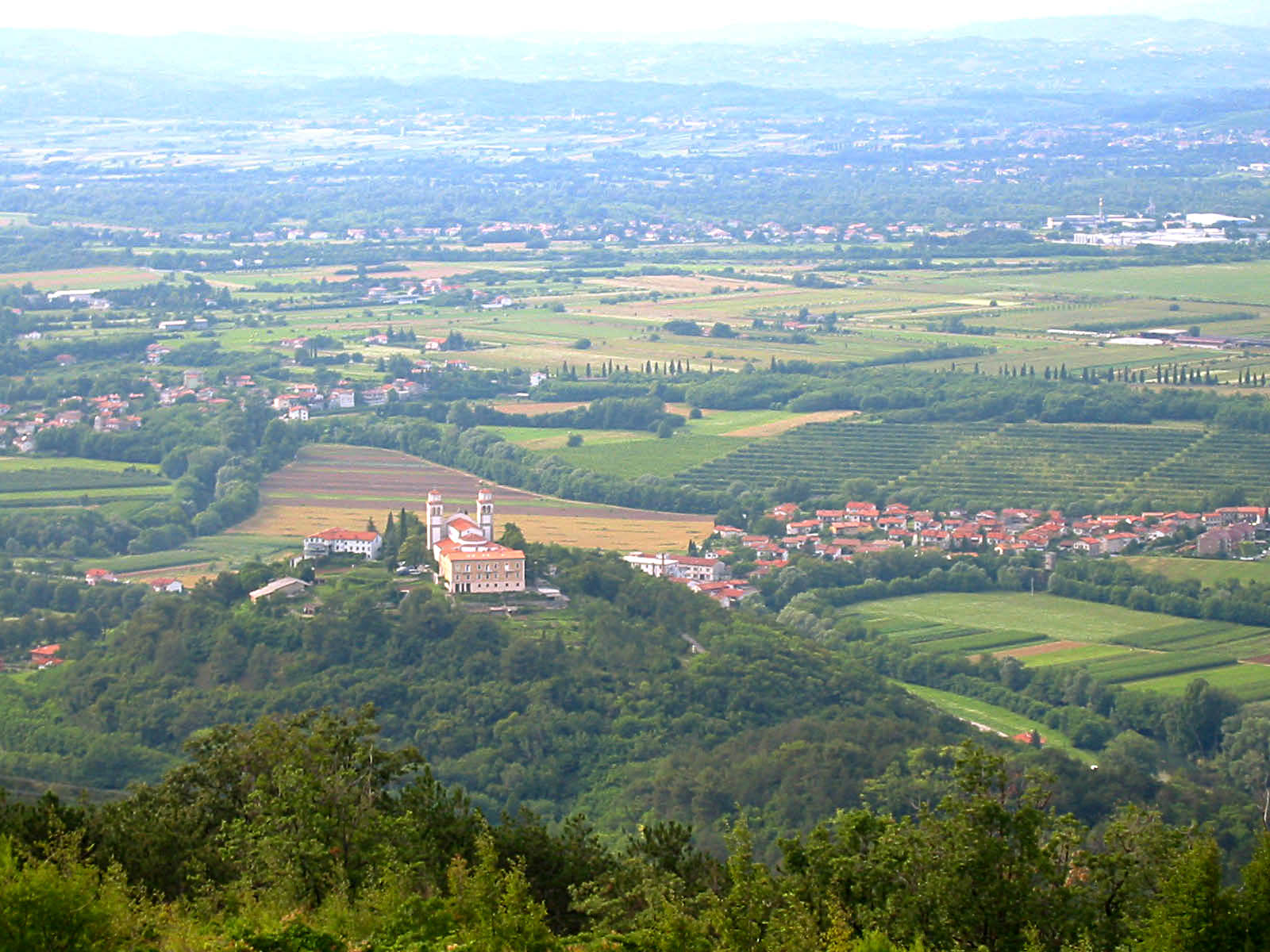

- Location of the Municipality of Miren-Kostanjevica in Slovenia
- Coordinates: 45°51′N 13°38′E
- Country: Slovenia

Government
  - Mayor: Mauricij Humar (Independent)

Area
  - Total: 62.8 km^{2} (24.2 sq mi)

Population (2002)
  - Total: 4,741
  - Density: 75.5/km^{2} (196/sq mi)
- Time zone: UTC+01 (CET)
  - Summer (DST): UTC+02 (CEST)
- Website: www.miren-kostanjevica.si

The Municipality of Miren-Kostanjevica (pronounced [ˈmiːɾən kɔˈstaːnjɛʋitsa]; Slovene: Občina Miren - Kostanjevica, Italian: Comune di Merna Castagnevizza) is a municipality in western Slovenia, on the border with Italy.

Miren-Kostanjevica is part of the Goriška region of the Slovene Littoral, and its main settlements are Miren (the seat of the municipality) and Kostanjevica na Krasu. Miren is located in the lowest part of the Vipava Valley.

Historically, the area was connected with the neighbouring village of Savogna d'Isonzo (Slovenian: Sovodnje ob Soči), which was left in Italy after the Paris Peace Treaty of February 1947. Since the second half of the 19th century, Miren has been a commercial center and a center of light industry, strongly linked to the Gorizia and Monfalcone (Slovenian: Tržič) urban areas. Kostanjevica na Krasu, on the other hand, is a center of a larger underpopulated rural area located on the high Karst Plateau. In the local self-government reform of 1994, the two centers united to form a single municipality. Since 1947, both localities have gravitated towards the Nova Gorica–Šempeter conurbation, where many locals commute daily.

Miren has a border crossing into Italy.

== Settlements ==
In addition to the municipal seat of Miren, the municipality also includes the following settlements:

- Bilje
- Hudi Log
- Korita na Krasu
- Kostanjevica na Krasu
- Lipa
- Lokvica
- Nova Vas
- Novelo
- Opatje Selo
- Orehovlje
- Sela na Krasu
- Temnica
- Vojščica
- Vrtoče

== Notable natives and residents ==
- Oskar Kogoj, designer
- Dean Komel, philosopher
- Drago Marušič, politician, governor of the Drava Banovina (1931–34)
- Negovan Nemec, sculptor
- Igor Torkar, writer and political activist
- Stanko Vuk, poet and anti-fascist activist
