= 46th Artillery Regiment "Trento" =

Inactive Italian Army artillery unit

- 46° Reggimento Artiglieria "Trento"
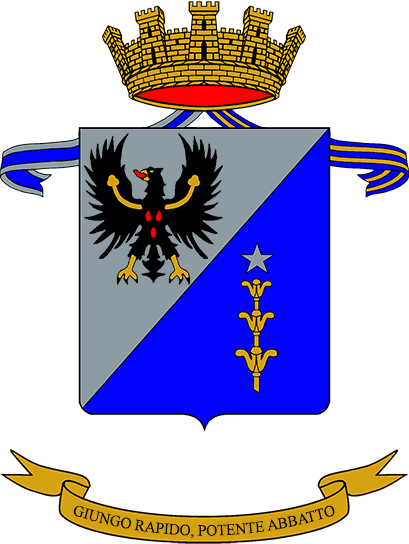
- Regimental coat of arms
- Active: May 1915 — Feb. 1919; 15 July 1935 — 25 Nov. 1942; 20 Oct. 1975 — 9 April 1991
- Country: Italy
- Branch: Italian Army
- Part of: Mechanized Brigade "Gorizia"
- Garrison/HQ: Gradisca d'Isonzo
- Mottos: "Giungo rapido, potente abbatto"
- Anniversaries: 15 June 1918 - Second Battle of the Piave River
- Decorations: 1× Silver Medal of Military Valor; 1× Bronze Medal of Army Valor

Insignia
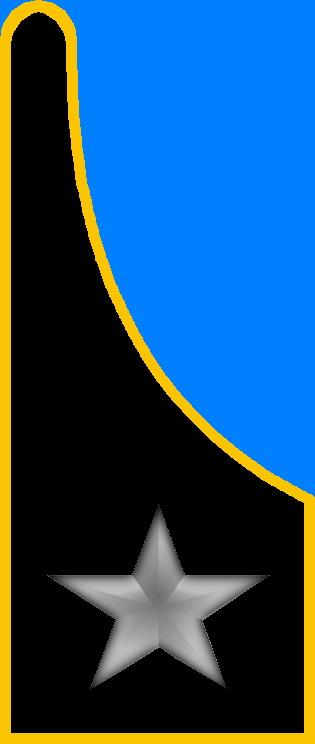
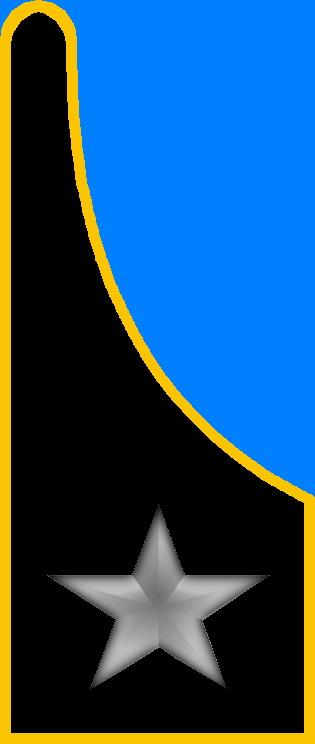
- Regimental gorget patches

The 46th Artillery Regiment "Trento" (Italian: 46° Reggimento Artiglieria "Trento") is an inactive field artillery regiment of the Italian Army, which was based in Gradisca d'Isonzo in Friuli-Venezia Giulia. Originally an artillery regiment of the Royal Italian Army, the regiment was formed days before Italy's entry into World War I and disbanded after the war. Reformed in 1935 for the Second Italo-Ethiopian War the regiment was assigned to the 102nd Motorized Division "Trento", with which the regiment served in World War II. In March 1941 the division and regiment were sent to Libya for the Western Desert campaign, during which both were destroyed in the Second Battle of El Alamein in November 1942.

In 1975 the unit was reformed as 46th Field Artillery Group "Trento" and assigned to the Mechanized Brigade "Gorizia". In 1991 the group was disbanded and its personnel, materiel, and base were assigned to the 184th Self-propelled Field Artillery Group "Filottrano". The regimental anniversary falls, as for all Italian Army artillery regiments, on June 15, the beginning of the Second Battle of the Piave River in 1918.

== History ==
=== World War I ===
In May 1915, just days before Italy's entry into World War I, the 46th Field Artillery Regiment was formed in Pavia by the depot of the 9th Field Artillery Regiment. The new regiment was assigned, together with the Brigade "Macerata" and Brigade "Sassari", to the 25th Division and consisted of a command, three groups with a combined eight batteries equipped with 75/27 mod. 06 field guns, and a pack battery with 70/15 mountain guns.

During the war the regiment served on the Italian front, where it fought in summer 1915 on Monte Sei Busi, at San Martino del Carso, and at Sdraussina. In May 1916 the regiment was again at San Martino del Carso and Sdraussina, before moving to Opatje Selo for the Sixth Battle of the Isonzo. During the Eighth Battle of the Isonzo the regiment was deployed at Nova Vas and Hudi Log. From May to August 1917 the regiment was deployed on Monte Vodice, Monte Kuk and Monte Jelenik. During the Second Battle of the Piave River in June 1918 the regiment was positioned near Fornaci and Case Ninni. In July 1918 the regiment was transferred to the Tonale Pass. During the decisive Battle of Vittorio Veneto the regiment was deployed on the Monte Pertica in the Monte Grappa massif and advanced to the Monte Prassolan from there to Fonzaso, where the news of the Armistice of Villa Giusti reached the regiment.

After the war the regiment was disbanded in February 1919.

=== Interwar years ===
On 15 July 1935 the regiment was reformed in Trento as 46th Artillery Regiment and was assigned to the 1st Motorized Division "Trento". The regiment consisted of a command, a command unit, the I Group with 100/17 mod. 14 howitzers, and the II Group with 75/27 mod. 11 field guns. The I Group had been formed by the depot of the 1st Army Corps Artillery Regiment in Casale Monferrato, while the II Group had been formed by the depot of the 23rd Artillery Regiment "Timavo" in Trieste, and been assigned to the 4th Heavy Field Artillery Regiment from 23 January to 15 August 1935. On 1 December 1935 the division was mobilized for service in the Second Italo-Ethiopian War. Before departing Italy the I Group exchanged its 100/17 mod. 14 howitzers for 75/27 mod. 11 field guns. The division was sent to Marj in Libya to replace units deployed to East Africa. In August 1936 the division returned to Trento, where the regiment received on 20 August a newly formed I Group with 100/17 mod. 14 howitzers, which joined the II and III groups with 75/27 mod. 11 field guns. On 2 January 1939 the division changed its name to 102nd Motorized Division "Trento" and on the same date the 46th Artillery Regiment changed its names to 46th Artillery Regiment "Trento".

=== World War II ===
On 10 June 1940, the day Italy entered World War II, the regiment consisted of a command, a command unit, the I Group with 100/17 mod. 14 howitzers, the II and III groups with 75/27 mod. 06 field guns, the 7th and 8th anti-aircraft batteries with 20/65 mod. 35 anti-aircraft guns, and a depot. On 9 December 1940 the British Western Desert Force commenced Operation Compass, which led to the collapse of the Italian 10th Army in Eastern Libya. In March 1941 the 102nd Motorized Division "Trento", which also included the 7th Bersaglieri Regiment, 61st Motorized Infantry Regiment "Trento", and 62nd Motorized Infantry Regiment "Trento", disembarked in Libya. The division and its regiments fought in the Western Desert Campaign and participated in the initial Axis counterattack that led to the Siege of Tobruk. In June 1941 the regiment defended Halfaya Pass and Fort Capuzzo against British forces during Operation Battleaxe. In August of the same year the regiment was reinforced with the 302nd Anti-tank Battery with 47/32 anti-tank guns.

In December 1941 the British Eighth Army initiated Operation Crusader, which forced the Axis forces to fall back to El Agheila. Due to the losses in men and materiel suffered during the battle and retreat the 46th Artillery Regiment "Trento" merged January 1942 its two groups with 75/27 mod. 06 field guns into one. Over the next months the regiment was reinforced with two newly formed groups with 75/27 mod. 06 field guns and one newly formed group with 100/17 mod. 14 howitzers.

At the end of March 1942 the regiment consisted of a command, a command unit, the I and II groups with 100/17 mod. 14 howitzers, the III and IV groups with 75/27 mod. 06 field guns, and the 412th and 414th anti-aircraft batteries with 20/65 mod. 35 anti-aircraft guns. In May 1942 the regiment fought in the Battle of Gazala, which resulted in the Axis capture of Tobruk. The regiment then participated in the First Battle of El Alamein, Battle of Alam el Halfa, and Second Battle of El Alamein, during which the 102nd Motorized Division "Trento" and its regiment's were destroyed. The division and its regiments were declared lost due to wartime events on 25 November 1942.

For its conduct and sacrifice in the Second Battle of El Alamein the 46th Artillery Regiment "Trento" was awarded a Silver Medal of Military Valor, which was affixed on the regiment's flag and is depicted on the regiment's coat of arms.

=== Cold War ===
During the 1975 army reform the army disbanded the regimental level and newly independent battalions and groups were granted for the first time their own flags. On 19 October 1975 the I Group of the 33rd Field Artillery Regiment became an autonomous unit and the next day the group was renamed 46th Field Artillery Group "Trento". The group was based in Gradisca d'Isonzo and assigned to the Mechanized Brigade "Gorizia". It consisted of a command, a command and services battery, and three batteries with towed M114 155 mm howitzers.

On 12 November 1976 the President of the Italian Republic Giovanni Leone assigned with decree 846 the flag and traditions of the 46th Artillery Regiment "Trento" to the group. At the time the group fielded 485 men (37 officers, 58 non-commissioned officers, and 390 soldiers).

For its conduct and work after the 1976 Friuli earthquake the group was awarded a Bronze Medal of Army Valor, which was affixed to the group's flag and added to the group's coat of arms. In July 1981 the group was equipped with M109G 155 mm self-propelled howitzers and changed its name to 46th Self-propelled Field Artillery Group "Trento".

=== Recent times ===
On 9 April 1991 the 46th Self-propelled Field Artillery Group "Trento" was disbanded and the next day the disbanded group's personnel, materiel, and base were used to form 184th Self-propelled Field Artillery Group "Filottrano", which took the Trento's place in the Mechanized Brigade "Gorizia". On 5 June of the same year the flag of the 46th Artillery Regiment "Trento" was returned to the Shrine of the Flags in the Vittoriano in Rome.
