= Vojščica =

- Location in Slovenia
- Coordinates: 45°49′30.09″N 13°39′47.39″E
- Country: Slovenia
- Traditional region: Littoral
- Statistical region: Gorizia
- Municipality: Miren-Kostanjevica

Area
  - Total: 6.96 km^{2} (2.69 sq mi)
- Elevation: 302.6 m (993 ft)

Population (2002)
  - Total: 222

Vojščica (pronounced [ʋɔi̯ˈʃtʃiːtsa]; Italian: Voissizza) is a village southeast of Kostanjevica in the Municipality of Miren-Kostanjevica in the Littoral region of Slovenia close to the border with Italy.

The parish church in the settlement is dedicated to Saint Vitus and belongs to the Diocese of Koper.
