= Orehovlje =

Orehovlje may refer to two places in Slovenia:

- Orehovlje, Kranj, a settlement in the City Municipality of Kranj
- Orehovlje, Miren-Kostanjevica, a settlement in the Municipality of Miren-Kostanjevica
