= Korita na Krasu =

- Location in Slovenia
- Coordinates: 45°50′2.78″N 13°37′4.37″E
- Country: Slovenia
- Traditional region: Littoral
- Statistical region: Gorizia
- Municipality: Miren-Kostanjevica

Area
  - Total: 1.04 km^{2} (0.40 sq mi)
- Elevation: 225.3 m (739 ft)

Population (2002)
  - Total: 46

Korita na Krasu (pronounced [kɔˈɾiːta na ˈkɾaːsu]) is a settlement west of Kostanjevica na Krasu in the Municipality of Miren-Kostanjevica in the Littoral region of Slovenia, close to the border with Italy.

== Name ==
The name of the settlement was changed from Korita to Korita na Krasu in 1955.

== Mass grave ==
Korita na Krasu is the site of a mass grave possibly associated with the Second World War. The Korita Cavern Mass Grave (Slovene: Grobišče Kaverna v Koritah) is located on the slope of a shallow valley in the hills about 270 meters (890 ft) south of the crossroads in the settlement and 80 meters (260 ft) east of the road to Sela na Krasu. Although the grave contains human remains, the configuration of the shaft casts doubt on whether it is a concealed grave from the war.
