= Bilje =

Bilje may refer to:

- Bilje, Croatia, a village in the Osijek-Baranja County
- Bilje, Slovenia, a village in the Municipality of Miren-Kostanjevica
