= Vrtoče =

Vrtoče may refer to:

- Vrtoče, Bosanski Petrovac, a village in Bosnia and Herzegovina
- Vrtoče, Drvar, a village in Bosnia and Herzegovina
- Vrtoče, Milići, a village in Milići, Republika Srpska, Bosnia and Herzegovina
- Vrtoče, Miren-Kostanjevica, a village in Slovenia
