= Novelo =

- Location in Slovenia
- Coordinates: 45°50′42.33″N 13°39′50.26″E
- Country: Slovenia
- Traditional region: Littoral
- Statistical region: Gorizia
- Municipality: Miren-Kostanjevica

Area
  - Total: 1.83 km^{2} (0.71 sq mi)
- Elevation: 351.9 m (1,155 ft)

Population (2002)
  - Total: 54
- Postal Code: 5296

Novelo (pronounced [nɔˈʋeːlɔ]) is a small settlement east of Kostanjevica na Krasu in the Municipality of Miren-Kostanjevica in the Littoral region of Slovenia.
