= Lipa, Miren-Kostanjevica =

Lipa
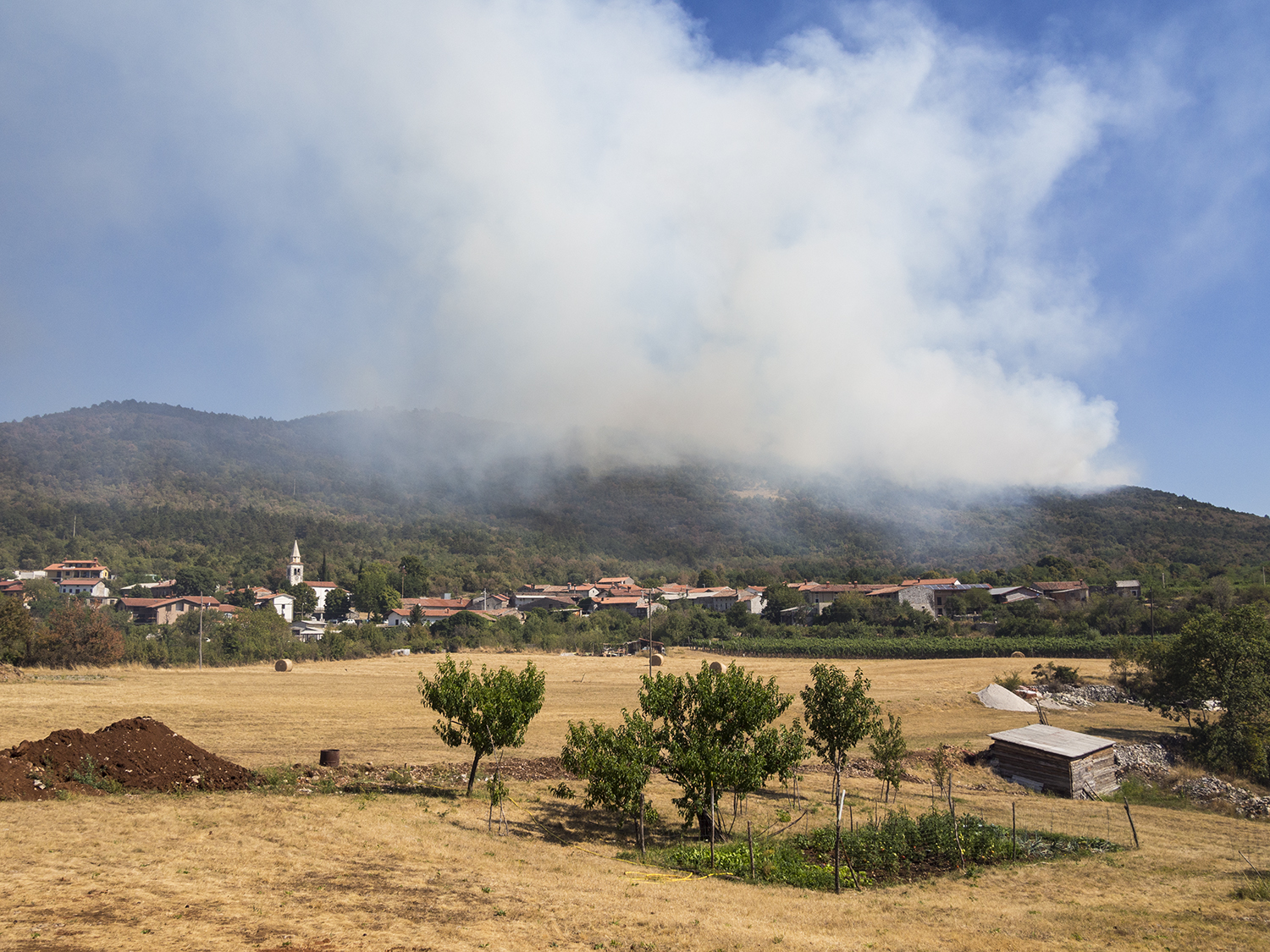
- Fire on Trstelj Hill (2013). In the foreground, the village of Lipa.

- Location in Slovenia
- Coordinates: 45°50′55.02″N 13°42′15.96″E
- Country: Slovenia
- Traditional region: Littoral
- Statistical region: Gorizia
- Municipality: Miren-Kostanjevica

Area
  - Total: 6.28 km^{2} (2.42 sq mi)
- Elevation: 377 m (1,237 ft)

Population (2002)
  - Total: 92

Lipa (pronounced [ˈliːpa]) is a village in the Municipality of Miren-Kostanjevica in the Littoral region of Slovenia.

== History ==
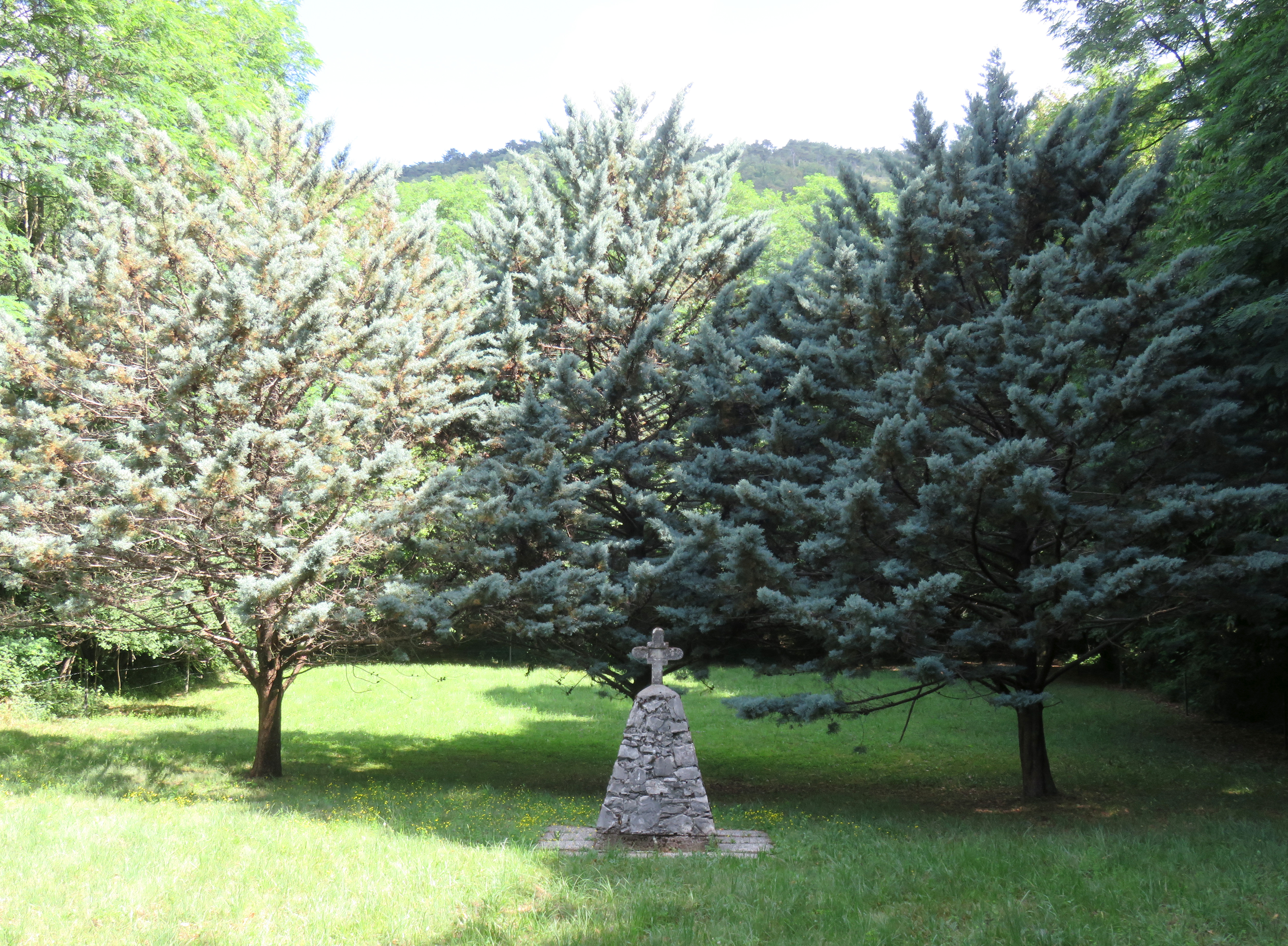
Cemetery no. 1

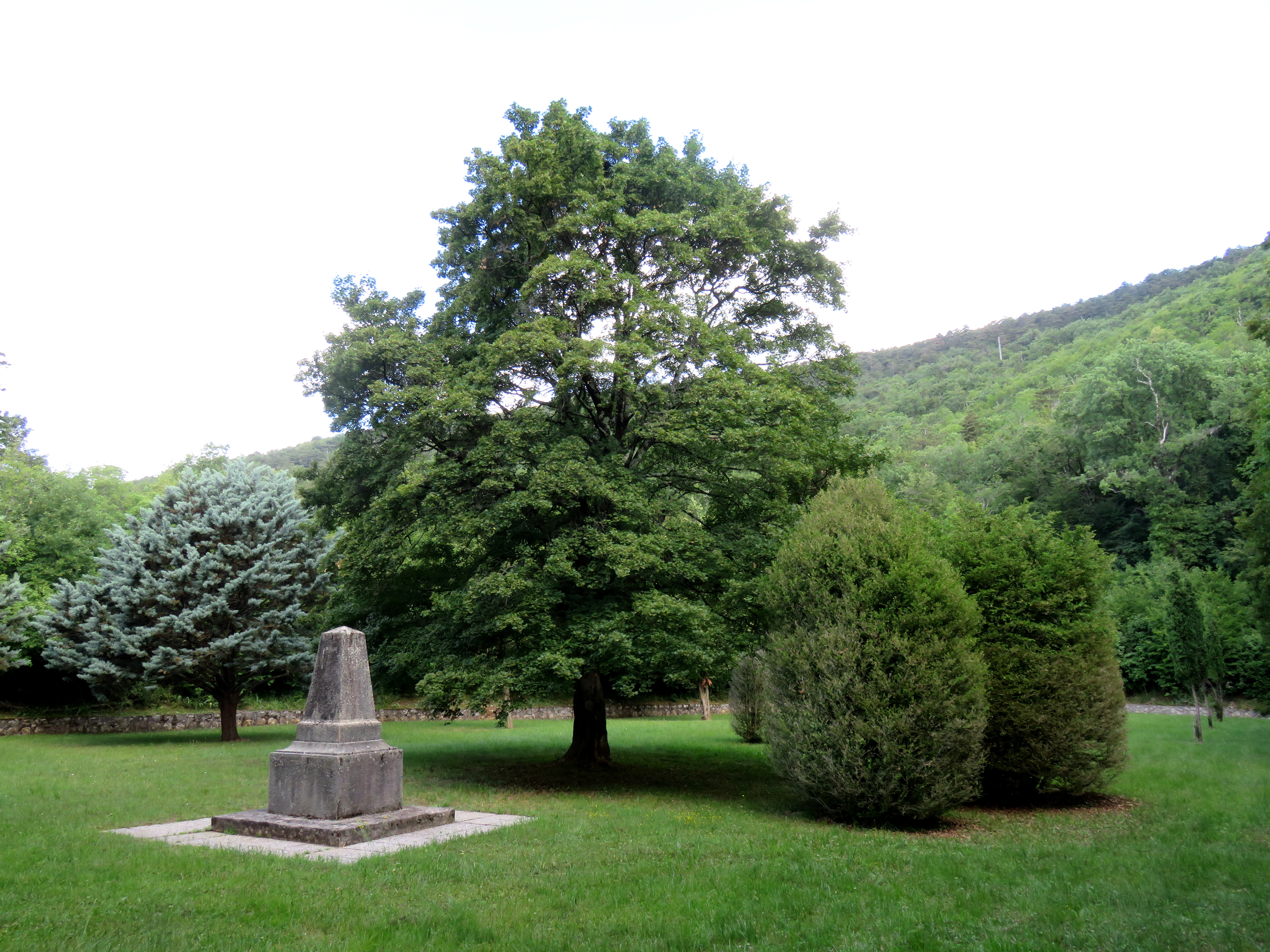
Cemetery no. 2

Austro-Hungarian First World War cemeteries

During the First World War, Lipa was directly to the rear of the Austro-Hungarian front line. A military hospital was set up in the village, and many of the village's houses were destroyed during the war. There are two Austro-Hungarian military cemeteries directly northeast of Lipa; their central monuments are preserved, but the individual grave markers no longer remain.

== Church ==
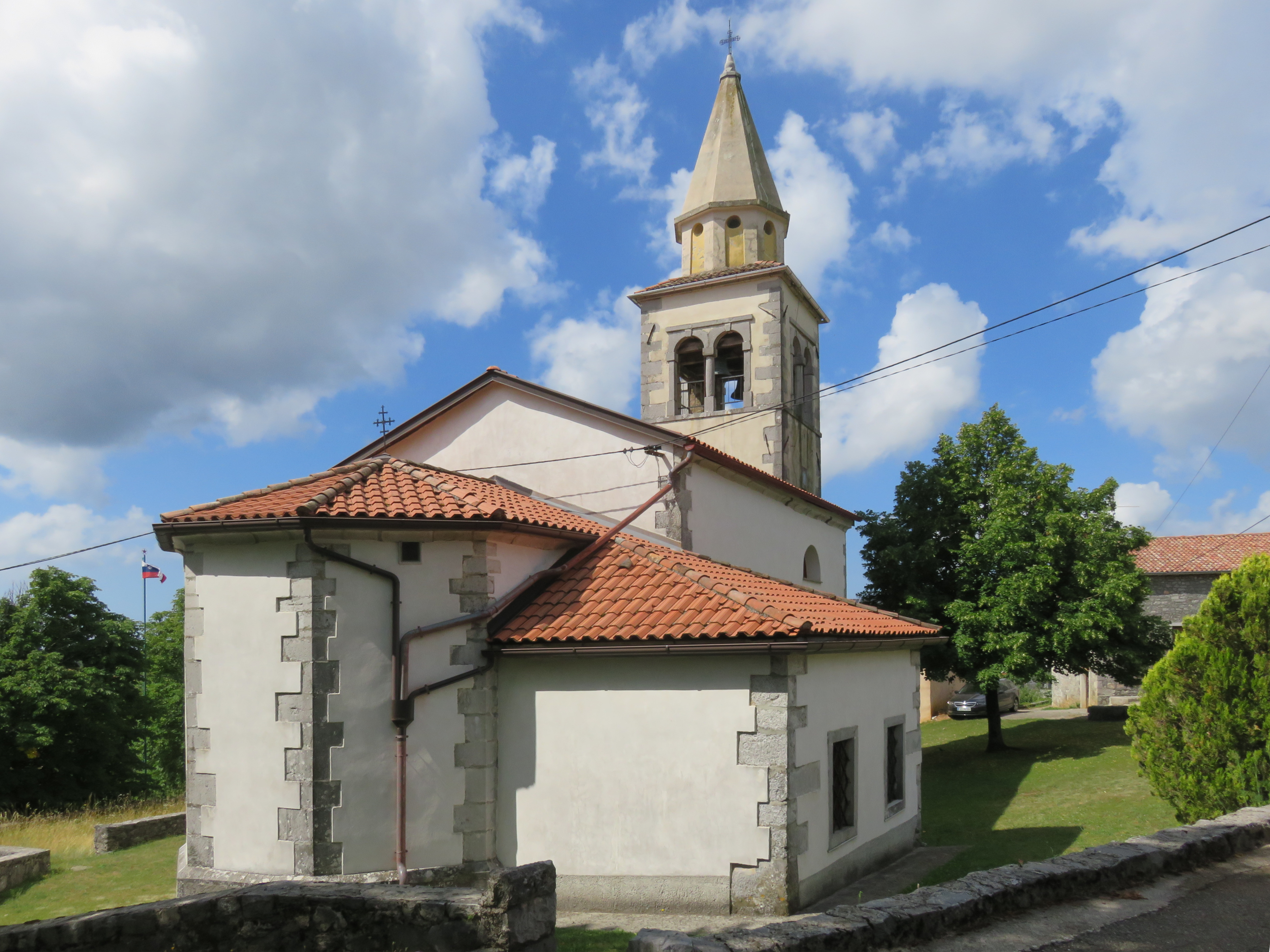
Archangel Michael Church

The local church is dedicated to the Archangel Michael and belongs to the Parish of Temnica.
