= Cannone da 75/27 modello 12 =

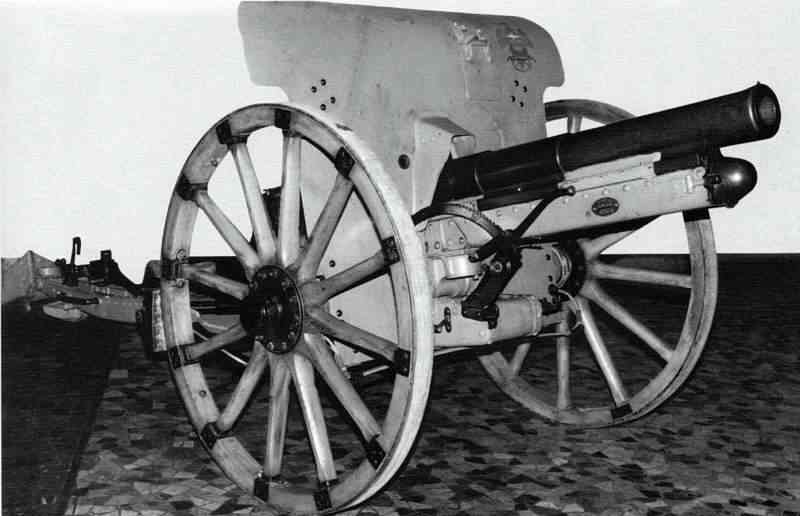
- Type: Horse artillery
- Place of origin: German Empire

Service history
- In service: 1912–1945
- Used by: Kingdom of Italy; Nazi Germany
- Wars: World War I World War II

Production history
- Designer: Krupp
- Produced: 1912

Specifications
- Mass: Travel: 1,700 kg (3,700 lb); Firing: 900 kg (2,000 lb)
- Barrel length: 2.25 m (7 ft 5 in) L/30
- Height: .99 m (3 ft 3 in)
- Crew: 8
- Shell: Semifixed 75 x 185mm R
- Shell weight: 6.3 kg (14 lb)
- Caliber: 75 mm (3 in)
- Breech: Horizontal sliding-block
- Recoil: Hydro-spring
- Carriage: Box trail
- Elevation: -12° to +18°
- Traverse: 7°
- Rate of fire: 4-6 rpm
- Muzzle velocity: 502 m/s (1,650 ft/s)
- Maximum firing range: 6.8 km (4.2 mi)

The Cannone da 75/27 modello 1912 cannon was a piece of horse artillery used by the Royal Italian Army during the First and Second World Wars. It was an improved version of the Cannone da 75/27 modello 06. The Germans designated captured guns as the 7.5 cm Feldkanone 245(i).

== History ==
In 1906 the Royal Italian Army ordered the Cannone da 75/27 modello 06 from Krupp to replace its obsolete Cannone da 75A. Later in 1912, a new version of the mod. 06 modified for use as horse artillery was ordered. These pieces would equipped the Royal Italian Army's Horse Artillery Regiment during World War I and World War II.

In 1939, 51 mod. 12s were still in use by the Royal Italian Army and during the Second World War, they equipped one group in each of the three cavalry artillery regiments. In June 1941 the three groups were consolidated to form the 3rd Cavalry Artillery Regiment of the 3rd Cavalry Division "Principe Amedeo Duca d'Aosta" that participated in the Italian expeditionary force during the invasion of the Soviet Union. In response to the heavy losses experienced by Axis forces on the Eastern Front and North Africa, Italian mobile artillery regiments were reorganized, reequipped and motorized during 1942 with two groups of Cannone da 75/27 modello 11s and one group of Obice da 100/17s.

== Design ==
The mod 1912 was a breech-loaded gun with a Horizontal sliding-block breech, a box trail carriage, gun shield, hydro-spring recoil mechanism, and two wooden-spoked steel-rimmed wheels. The mod 12s carriage was designed to be towed at higher speed than the mod 06.

The barrel and the breech are the same as the mod 06, except the breech incorporates a counterweight to shift the center of gravity of the barrel rearward. The mod 12 uses a one-piece shield instead of a two-piece shield and it lacks the seats on the front of the shield of the mod 06. The mod 12 used the same fixed quickfire ammunition as the mod 06.

For transport, the mod 12 was attached to a limber that carried 28 rounds of ammunition and was towed by a six-horse team. Three gunners rode the three horses to the left, while the piece was preceded by the crew chief and followed by four gunners, all on horseback, for a total of 11 animals per gun.

== Gallery ==
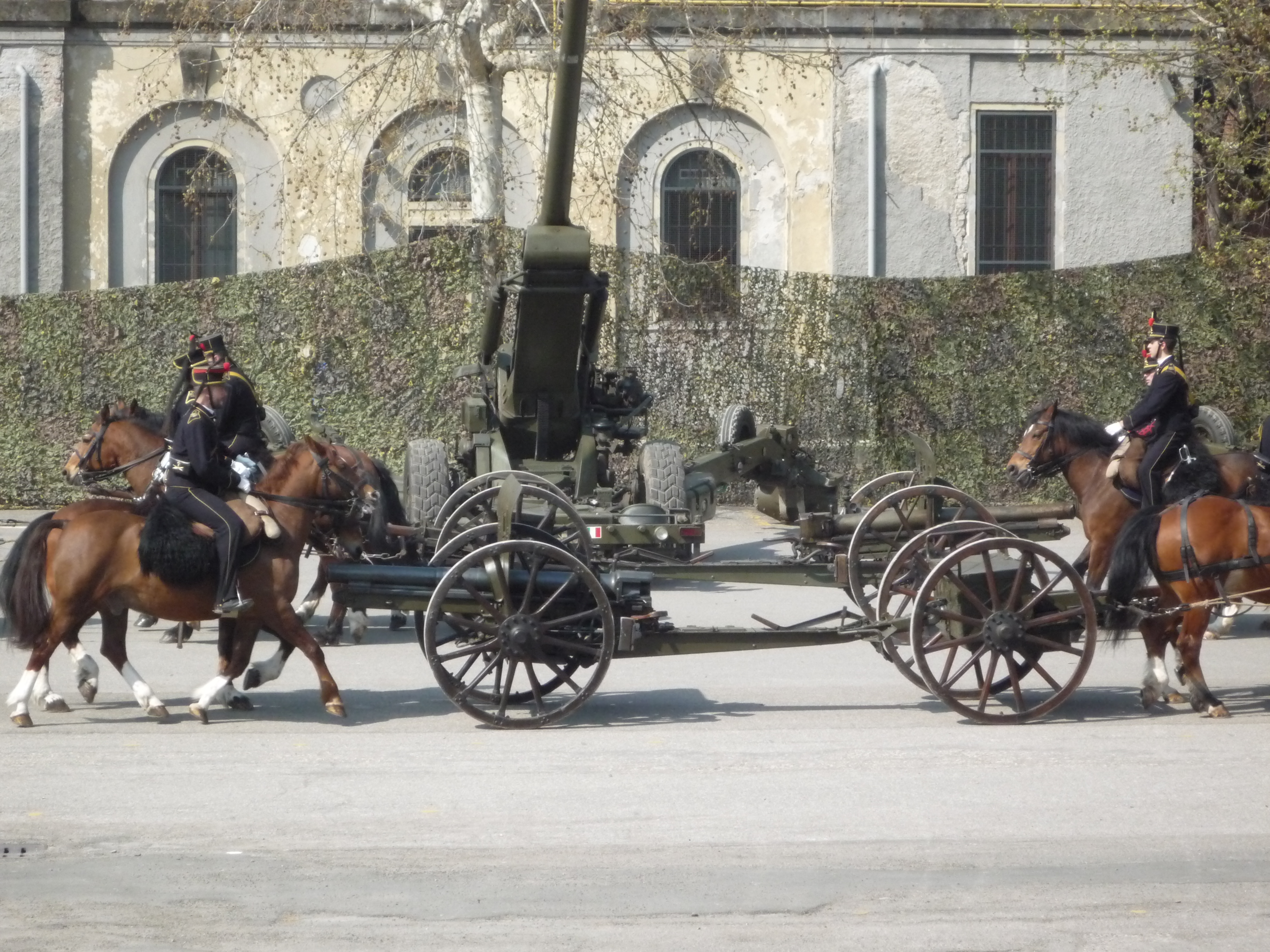
Italian Army Field Artillery Regiment "a Cavallo" Historic Section Cannone da 75/27 mod. 12

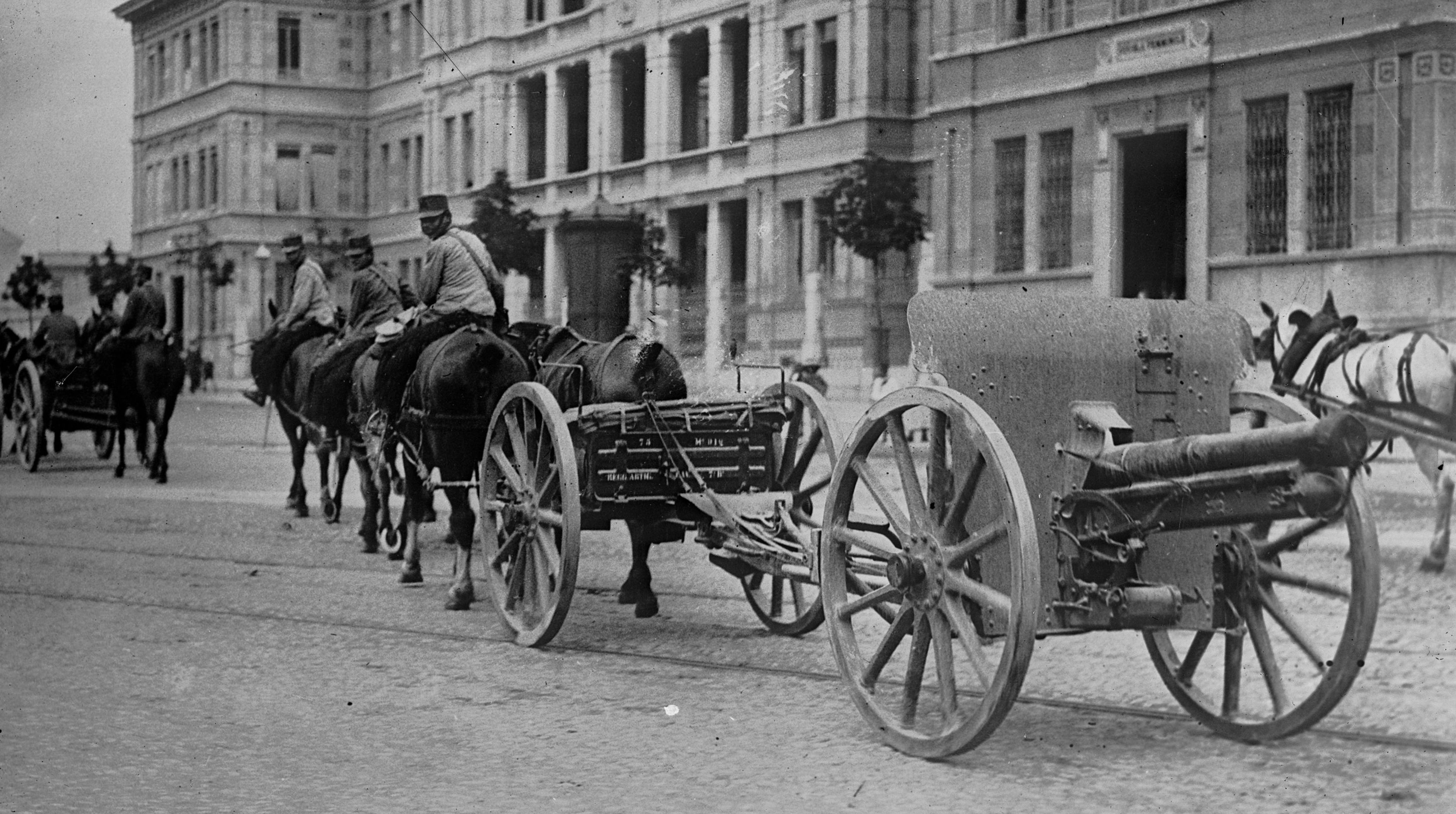
A photo showing the transport of a Cannone da 75/27 mod. 12

== Related guns ==
- Krupp 7.5 cm Model 1903 - Krupp progenitor of the modello 1906 and modello 1912.
- Canon de 75 mle TR - Belgian field gun based on the M1903.
- Canon de 75 mle GP II - Belgian upgrade of the TR.
- Type 38 75 mm field gun - Japanese field gun based on the M1903.
- Siderius 7-veld - Dutch field gun based on the M1903.
