= Temnica =

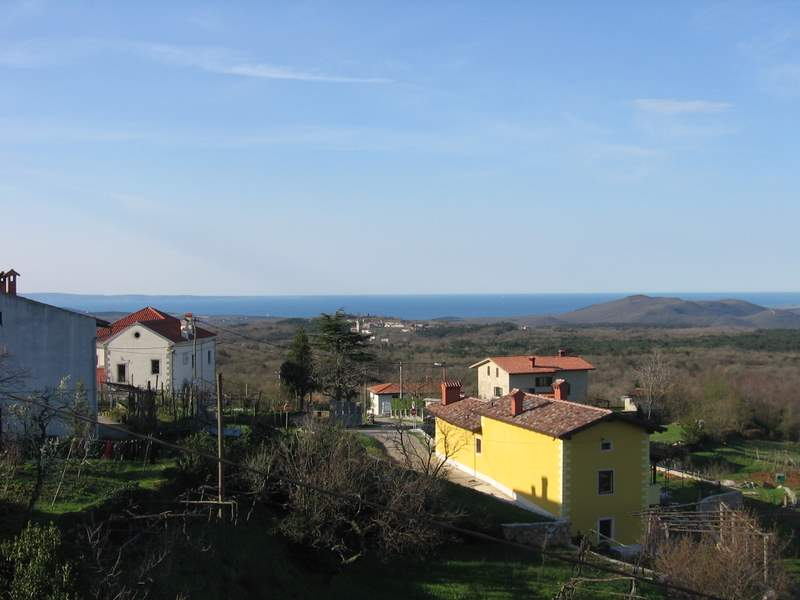

- Location in Slovenia
- Coordinates: 45°50′47.12″N 13°40′39.74″E
- Country: Slovenia
- Traditional region: Littoral
- Statistical region: Gorizia
- Municipality: Miren-Kostanjevica

Area
  - Total: 5.4 km^{2} (2.1 sq mi)
- Elevation: 402 m (1,319 ft)

Population (2002)
  - Total: 151

Temnica (pronounced [tɛˈmniːtsa]) is a village east of Kostanjevica in the Municipality of Miren-Kostanjevica in the Littoral region of Slovenia.

The parish church in the settlement is dedicated to Saint Peter and belongs to the Diocese of Koper.
