= Lokvica, Slovenia =

Lokvica
- Location in Slovenia
- Coordinates: 45°51′40″N 13°36′14.21″E
- Country: Slovenia
- Traditional region: Littoral
- Statistical region: Gorizia
- Municipality: Miren-Kostanjevica

Area
  - Total: 6.03 km^{2} (2.33 sq mi)
- Elevation: 217.8 m (715 ft)

Population (2002)
  - Total: 82

Lokvica (pronounced [ˈloːkʋitsa]) is a settlement in the Municipality of Miren-Kostanjevica in the Littoral region of Slovenia next to the border with Italy.
