= Vrtoče, Miren-Kostanjevica =

Vrtoče
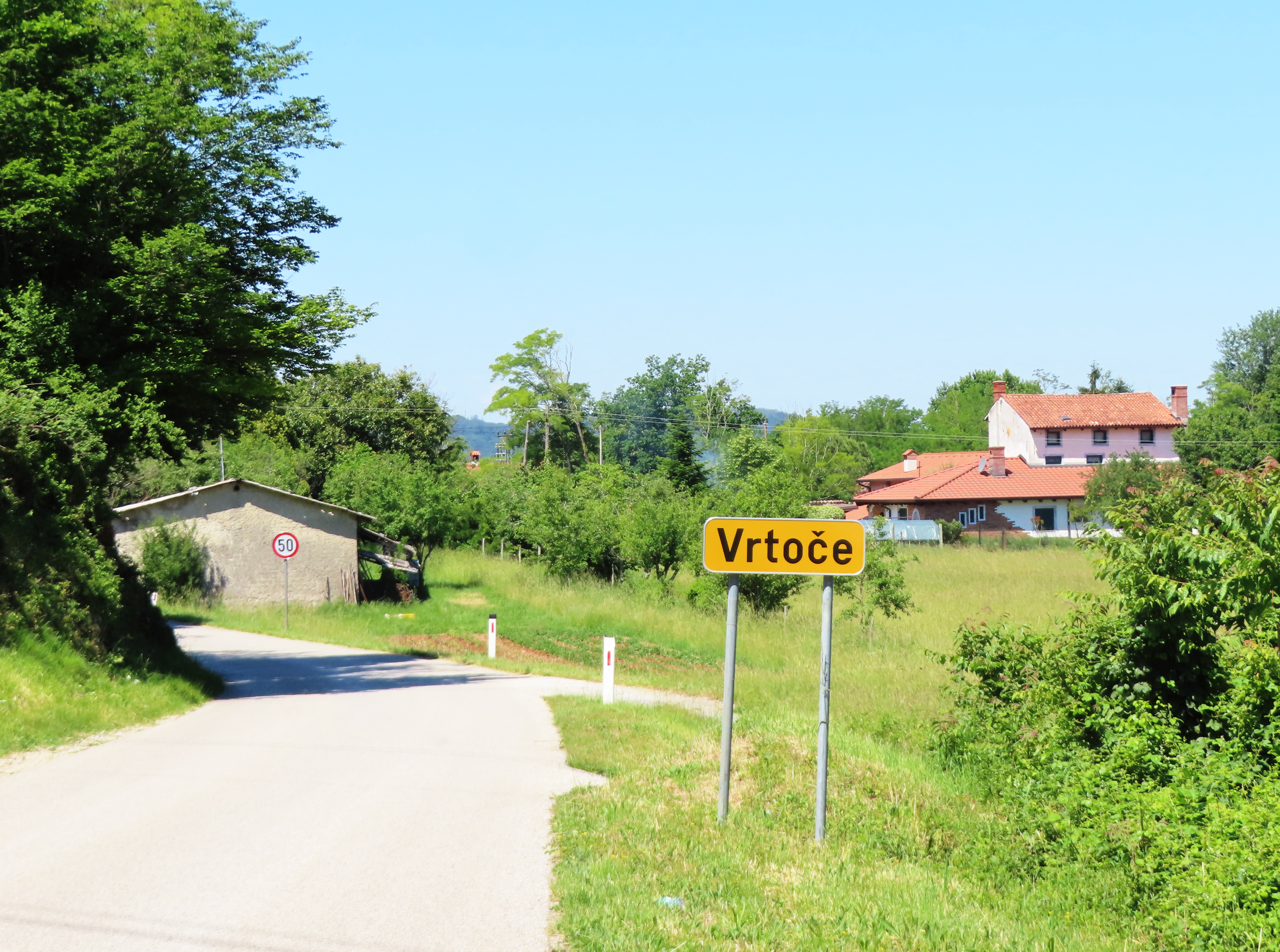

- Location in Slovenia
- Coordinates: 45°52′57.35″N 13°37′1.44″E
- Country: Slovenia
- Traditional region: Littoral
- Statistical region: Gorizia
- Municipality: Miren-Kostanjevica

Area
  - Total: 2.77 km^{2} (1.07 sq mi)
- Elevation: 48.3 m (158 ft)

Population (2002)
  - Total: 51

Vrtoče (pronounced [ˈʋəɾtɔtʃɛ]) is a dispersed settlement south of Bilje in the Municipality of Miren-Kostanjevica in the Littoral region of Slovenia.
