= Nova Vas, Miren-Kostanjevica =

Village in the Littoral region of Slovenia

Nova Vas
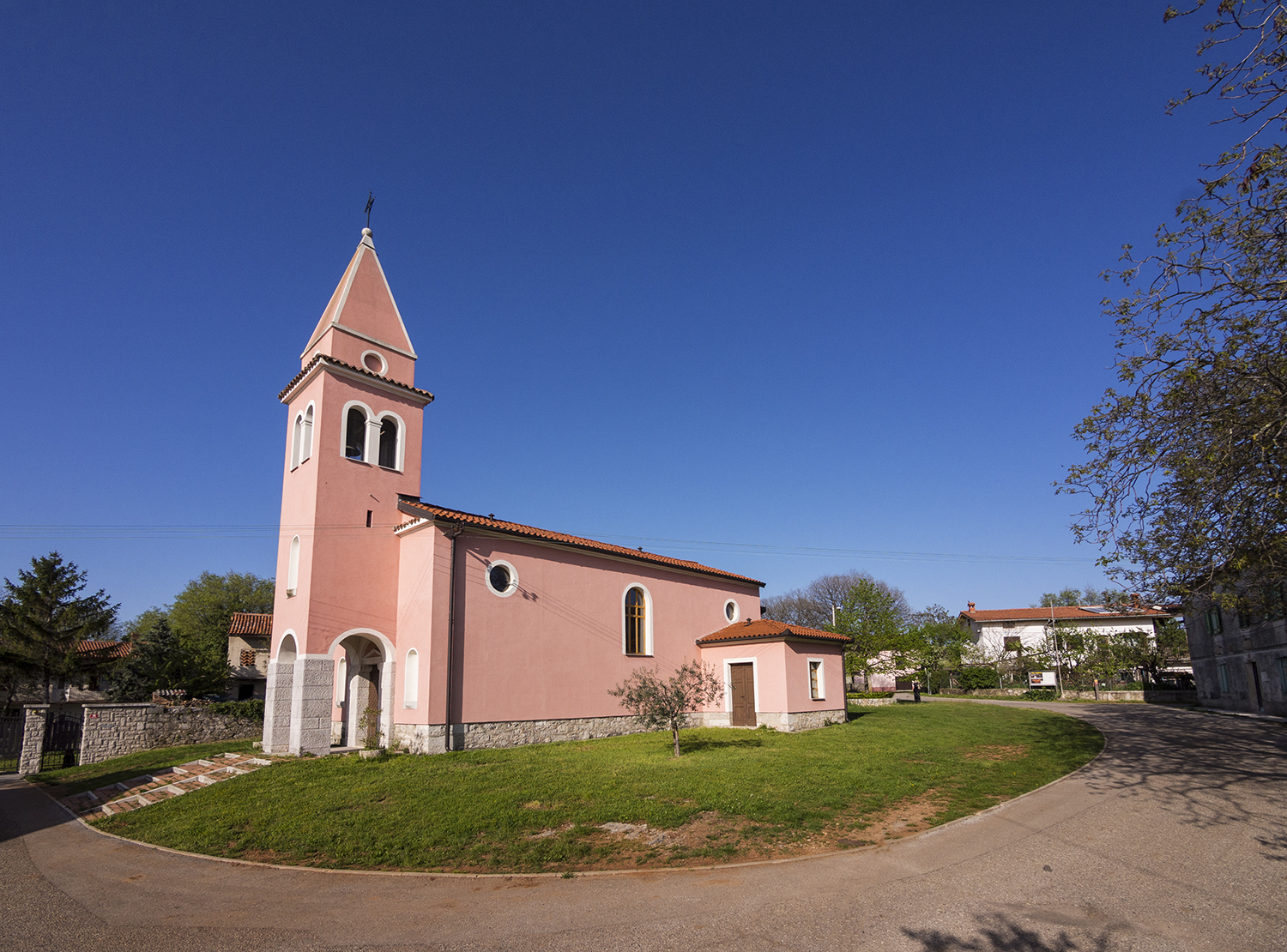

- Location in Slovenia
- Coordinates: 45°50′34.31″N 13°35′0.77″E
- Country: Slovenia
- Traditional region: Littoral
- Statistical region: Gorizia
- Municipality: Miren-Kostanjevica

Area
  - Total: 3.01 km^{2} (1.16 sq mi)
- Elevation: 205.4 m (674 ft)

Population (2002)
  - Total: 57

Nova Vas (pronounced [ˈnɔːʋa ˈʋaːs]; Slovene: Nova vas) is a small village in the Municipality of Miren-Kostanjevica in the Littoral region of Slovenia next to the border with Italy.

The local church is dedicated to Saint Sylvester and belongs to the Parish of Opatje Selo.
