= Drago Marušič =

Slovenian and Yugoslav politician and jurist

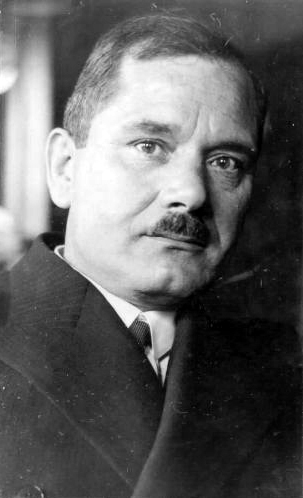

Minister of Health and Social Affairs
- In office 22 December 1934 – 24 June 1935
- Prime Minister: Bogoljub Jevtić
- Preceded by: Ivan Puceli

Minister of Justice
- In office 8 July 1944 – 7 March 1945
- Prime Minister: Ivan Šubašić (1944); Josip Broz Tito (1944–45)
- Preceded by: Vladeta Milićević
- Succeeded by: Frane Frol

Minister of Post and Telegraph
- In office 7 March 1945 – 1 January 1948
- Prime Minister: Josip Broz Tito
- Preceded by: Post created
- Succeeded by: Zajm Sarac

Personal details
- Born: 10 December 1884 Opatje selo, Gorizia and Gradisca, Austria-Hungary
- Died: 30 September 1964 (aged 79) Ljubljana, SR Slovenia, Yugoslavia

Drago Marušič (10 December 1884 – 30 September 1964) was a Slovenian and Yugoslav politician and jurist.

Born in Opatje Selo in present-day western Slovenia, Marušič studied law at Universities of Graz and Prague, where he graduated in 1911. During World War I he escaped to the Russian side and joined a volunteer legion in Serbia. Then, as a member of the Yugoslav Committee he worked in Rome, in the United States, and finally in Paris, where he attended the 1919 Peace Conference along with Ante Trumbić. He was a member of the Independent Agrarian Party (SKS), and later a member of the Yugoslav National Party (JNS).

After the January 6th Dictatorship was established by King Alexander in 1929, first he was appointed to the Supreme Legislative Council, and in December 1930 Marušič was made Ban of the Drava Banovina province. In December 1934 he became a minister in the government cabinet of Bogoljub Jevtić. In the 1935 general election he was elected to the post of Senator, after which he became a member of the National Assembly.

Following the April 1941 Invasion of Yugoslavia he became a high-ranking member of the Liberation Front of the Slovene Nation (OF), and from 1942 he was interred in Italy. After the capitulation of Italy in 1943, he was released and became a member of the regional branches of OF and the Slovene National Liberation Committee (SNOS) in the Slovenian Littoral region. From 1944 to 1945 he was justice minister in the Yugoslav government-in-exile of Ivan Šubašić, and later served in the unified government of the Democratic Federal Yugoslavia led by Josip Broz Tito until January 1948.

After the Second World War, he held the post of president of the Slovenian Red Cross.
