= Dean Komel =

Slovenian philosopher (born 1960)

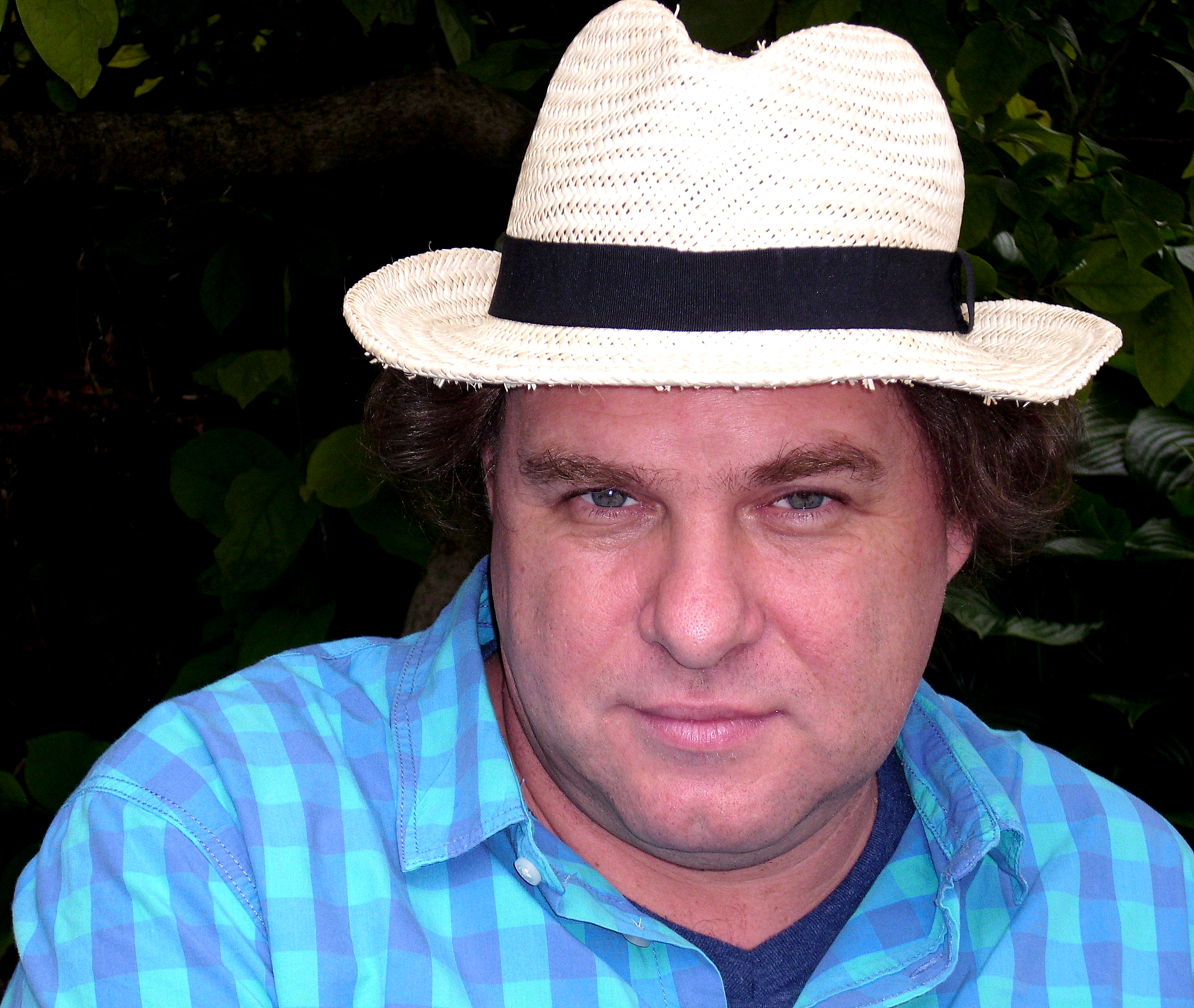
Dean Komel

Dean Komel (born 7 June 1960) is a Slovenian philosopher.

He was born in the small village of Bilje in the Goriška region of Slovenia, then part of the Socialist Federal Republic of Yugoslavia.

After finishing the Nova Gorica Grammar School, he studied philosophy and comparative literature at the University of Ljubljana. After further studies with Bernhard Waldenfels and Klaus Held in Germany, he obtained his PhD in 1995 on the theme of a hermeneutic critique of the anthropological orientation in contemporary philosophy. He is the professor of contemporary philosophy and the philosophy of culture at the Department of Philosophy at the Faculty of Arts of the University of Ljubljana. He is additionally president of the Phenomenological Society in Ljubljana and is on the editorial board of a number of journals for philosophy and culture, including Phainomena, Nova revija, Orbis Phaenomenologicus. Since 2005 he has also headed research activities at the Humanistic institute of Nova revija. He has lectured at numerous universities and international symposia. Hermeneutic questions of contemporary philosophy stand out in his philosophical works. Within this context he develops philosophical reflection on language, historicity, art, interculturality and humanistics.

Komel is considered one of the major exponents of the phenomenological current in Slovene philosophy, continuating the tradition of France Veber, Dušan Pirjevec Ahac, Ivan Urbančič and Tine Hribar. In 2003 he received the Zois Award of the Republic of Slovenia for top scientific achievements in the field of philosophy.

== Major works ==
- Fenomenologija in vprašanje biti ("Phenomenology and the Question of Being"), Obzorja, Maribor 1993.
- Razprtost prebivanja ("The Disclosure of Being"), Ljubljana 1996.
- Diagrami bivanja ("Diagrammes of Existence"), Ljubljana 1998.
- Annäherungen: Zur hermeneutischen Phänomenologie von »Sein und Zeit«, ed., Nova Revija, Ljubljana 1999
- Osnutja ("Outlines"); Ljubljana 2001
- Uvod v filozofsko in kulturno hermenevtiko ("Introduction to Philosophical and Cultural Hermeneutics"), Filozofska fakulteta, Ljubljana 2003
- Identità e mediazione. Per un'ermeneutica dell' interculturalità, Edizioni Università, Trieste 2003
- Medpotja filozofije in kulture (" Paths between Philosophy and Culture"), Obzorja, Maribor 2004.
- Kunst und Sein. Phänomenologische Ästhetik und Aletheiologie, ed., K&N, Würzburg 2004.
- Tradition und Vermittlung. Der interkulturelle Sinn Europas, K&N, Würzburg 2005.
- Humanistični pogovori ("Humanistic Dialogues"), Miš, Dob 2007.
- Resnica in resničnost sodobnosti ("The Truth and Reality of Contemporaneity"), ZIFF, Ljubljana 2007.
- Smisao posredovanja ("The Sense of Mediation"), Demetra, Zagreb 2008.
- Dean Komel / Mira Miladinović Zalaznik (Eds.), The Faces of Europe, Phainomena, Nova revija, Ljubljana 2009
- Intermundus.Hermeneutisch-phänomenologische Entwürfe, K&N, Würzburg 2009
- Potikanja ("Ramblings"), KUD Apokalipsa, Ljubljana 2010
- Sodobnosti ("Conteporarities"), Nova revija, Ljubljana 2011
- Bivanja ("Existences"), Miš, Dob 2011
- Den Nihilismus verwinden, Traugott Bautz, Nordhausen 2012
- Kontemplationen. Entwürfe zur phänomenologischen Hermeneutik, Traugott Bautz, Nordhausen 2014
- Obeležja smisla (Features of Sense), FORHUM, Institute Nova revija, Ljubljana 2016
- Razotkrivenost prebivanja, Lara, Zagreb 2018 (trad.)
- Mira Miladinović Zalaznik / Dean Komel (Eds.), Freiheit und Gerechtigkeit als Herausforderung der Humanwissenschaften / Freedom and Justice as a Challenge of Humanities, Peter Lang, Bern - Berlin - New York - Oxford - Warszawa - Wien 2018
- Suvremenosti, Lara, Zagreb 2018 (trad.)
- Totalitarium, INR, Ljubljana 2019.
- Mira Miladinović Zalaznik / Dean Komel (Eds.), Europe at the Crossroads of Contemporary World : 100 Years after the Great War. Europa an den Scheidewegen der gegenwärtigen Welt : 100 Jahre nach dem Großen Krieg. Forhum, INR, Ljubljana 2020.
- Horizonti kontemporalnosti, INR, Ljubljana 2021.
- Cathrin Nielsen / Hans Rainer Sepp / Dean Komel (Hrsg. | Eds. | Dirs.), Eugen Fink : Annäherungen / Approaches / Rapprochements . Phainomena 31 | 122-123 | November 2022. Institute Nova revija in Zusammenarbeit mit: | in collaboration with: | en collaboration avec : Eugen-Fink-Zentrum Wuppertal * SIF Praha, Central-European Institute of Philosophy; https://www.phainomena.com/wp-content/uploads/2022/12/E-PHI_31_122-123_2022.pdf
- V paralaleh smisla, Inštitut Nove revije, Ljubljana 2023.
- Human Existence and Coexistence in the Epoch of Nihilism - Menschliche Existenz und Koexistenz in der Epoche des Nihilismus. Edited by Dean Komel, Alfredo Rocha de la Torre and Adriano Fabris.Phainomena 33 | 130-131, 2024. https://www.phainomena.com/aktualna-stevilka
