= Sela na Krasu =

- Location in Slovenia
- Coordinates: 45°49′21.3″N 13°37′2.16″E
- Country: Slovenia
- Traditional region: Littoral
- Statistical region: Gorizia
- Municipality: Miren-Kostanjevica

Area
  - Total: 4.13 km^{2} (1.59 sq mi)
- Elevation: 230.9 m (758 ft)

Population (2002)
  - Total: 156

Sela na Krasu (pronounced [ˈseːla na ˈkɾaːsu]; Italian: Sella delle Trincee) is a village in the Municipality of Miren-Kostanjevica in the Littoral region of Slovenia close to the border with Italy.

== Name ==
The name of the settlement was changed from Sela to Sela na Krasu in 1952.

== Church ==
The local church is dedicated to the Assumption of Mary and belongs to the Parish of Brestovica.
