= Orehovlje, Miren-Kostanjevica =

Orehovlje

- Location in Slovenia
- Coordinates: 45°53′13.91″N 13°36′37.84″E
- Country: Slovenia
- Traditional region: Littoral
- Statistical region: Gorizia
- Municipality: Miren-Kostanjevica

Area
  - Total: 1.35 km^{2} (0.52 sq mi)
- Elevation: 48.1 m (158 ft)

Population (2002)
  - Total: 494

Orehovlje (pronounced [ɔˈɾeːxɔu̯ljɛ]; Italian: Raccogliano) is a settlement next to Miren in the Municipality of Miren-Kostanjevica in the Littoral region of Slovenia.

== Church ==
Saint Augustine's Church

The local church is dedicated to Saint Augustine and belongs to the Parish of Miren.
