= Igor Torkar =

Slovenian writer and poet (1913–2004)

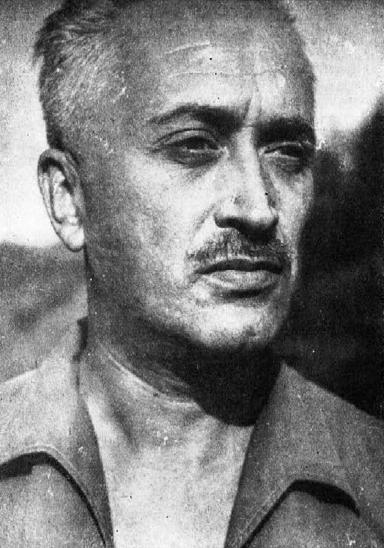
- Igor Torkar in 1962
- Born: Boris Fakin; 13 October 1913; Kostanjevica na Krasu, Gorizia and Gradisca, Austria-Hungary (now Slovenia)
- Died: 1 January 2004 (aged 90); Ljubljana, Slovenia
- Occupations: Writer; playwright; poet

Igor Torkar was the pen name of Boris Fakin (13 October 1913 – 1 January 2004), a Slovenian writer, playwright, and poet best known for his literary descriptions of Communist repression in Yugoslavia after World War II.

== Life ==
Torkar was born in a Slovene family in the village of Kostanjevica na Krasu, then part of the Austro-Hungarian County of Gorizia and Gradisca, now in Slovenia. He attended the Poljane Grammar School in Ljubljana. His teachers included the literary historian France Koblar, the writer Juš Kozak, and the painter Božidar Jakac.

In 1932, he enrolled in the University of Ljubljana, where he studied law for one year. Then he studied chemistry and graduated as chemistry engineer in 1942. He was a member of several left-wing student groups that advocated the autonomy of Slovenia within the Kingdom of Yugoslavia, and the democratization of the country. Among other things, he led a student association that successfully advocated the construction of a new university library building in Ljubljana.

During this time, he published his first short stories and essays under the pseudonym Igor Torkar in the literary journal Sodobnost. He also wrote political satires in the satirical magazine Pavliha, some of which were censored by the authorities of the Drava Banovina.

After the Axis invasion of Yugoslavia in April 1941, he became an activist of the Liberation Front of the Slovenian People. He never joined the partisan resistance, but organized the collection of supplies for the fighting units of the Communist resistance. In 1942, he was arrested by the Italian occupation authorities, but was released after two months in prison. In 1943, he was arrested by the Nazi German occupation forces and sent to Dachau concentration camp, where he remained until the end of World War II.

After the war, Torkar returned to Yugoslavia, where he worked as a technical manager in a chemical industry complex in Slovenia. In April 1948, he was arrested by the Yugoslav Communist authorities on false charges of pro-Nazi activity during World War II. He was put on trial at the Dachau trials together with another 33 survivors from Dachau and Buchenwald concentration camps who were accused of collaboration with the German Gestapo because, according to the prosecution, only collaboration could explain their survival. In 1949, he was sentenced to six years in prison, which was increased to 12 after the appeal. Torkar spent four years in prison (Goli Otok), including two years in solitary confinement. He was released in 1952, and was prohibited from publishing for two more years.

After two years of unemployment, Torkar became a lecturer at the Academy of Fine Arts in Ljubljana. In 1976, he rose to the position of professor of graphic technology. In 1971, the High Court of the Socialist Republic of Slovenia nullified the sentence from 1949, and Torkar was acquitted of all charges.

From the 1990s onward, Torkar became a critical commentator and observer of the democratization of Slovenia, with regular columns in the newspapers Delo and Dnevnik.

In October 2003, on the occasion of the author's 90th birthday, Slovenian National Television broadcast a documentary with the title 'Dying in Installments,' dedicated to Torkar's life story. He died on 1 January 2004, in Ljubljana.

== Work ==
Torkar's literary opus is framed by poetry. He published his first volume of poetry, Mad Chronos (Blazni Kronos) in 1940, with his last collection of poems, Songs of Solitude (Pesmi osekle samosti), written in the last years of his life and published in 2003. He has written over 10 collections of poetry, over 20 plays which were played on renewed theatre stages in Slovenia and also in former Yugoslavia, numerous TV and radio scenarios and novels. Between his most prominent works are also the poetry collection Sonnets from Jail (Jetniški soneti, 1974), stage plays Colorful ball (Pisana žoga, 1955) and Golden youth (Zlata mladina, 1970) and the novel Tenth brothers (Deseti bratje, 1979). His best-known work, in which he publicly revealed the taboo theme of the Dachau trails under the communist regime in the former Yugoslavia, is the novel Dying in Installments (Umiranje na obroke), published in 1984. The work was recognized as very courageous political act and triggered an extraordinary public response and awareness of the communist repression. In a deeply moving novel we meet with memory material, documents and literary fiction. More than 30,000 copies were published; the novel is translated into Serbo-Croatian (Umiranje na rate, published at Globus, Zagreb, 1984) and German (Sterben auf Raten, published at Drava, Klagenfurt, 1991).

In all his texts, Torkar expressed an outward humanistic vision of the world. Together with his lifelong friend, the poet Matej Bor, Torkar was the foremost representative of the neo-humanist trend in Slovenian literature.
