= Hudi Log =

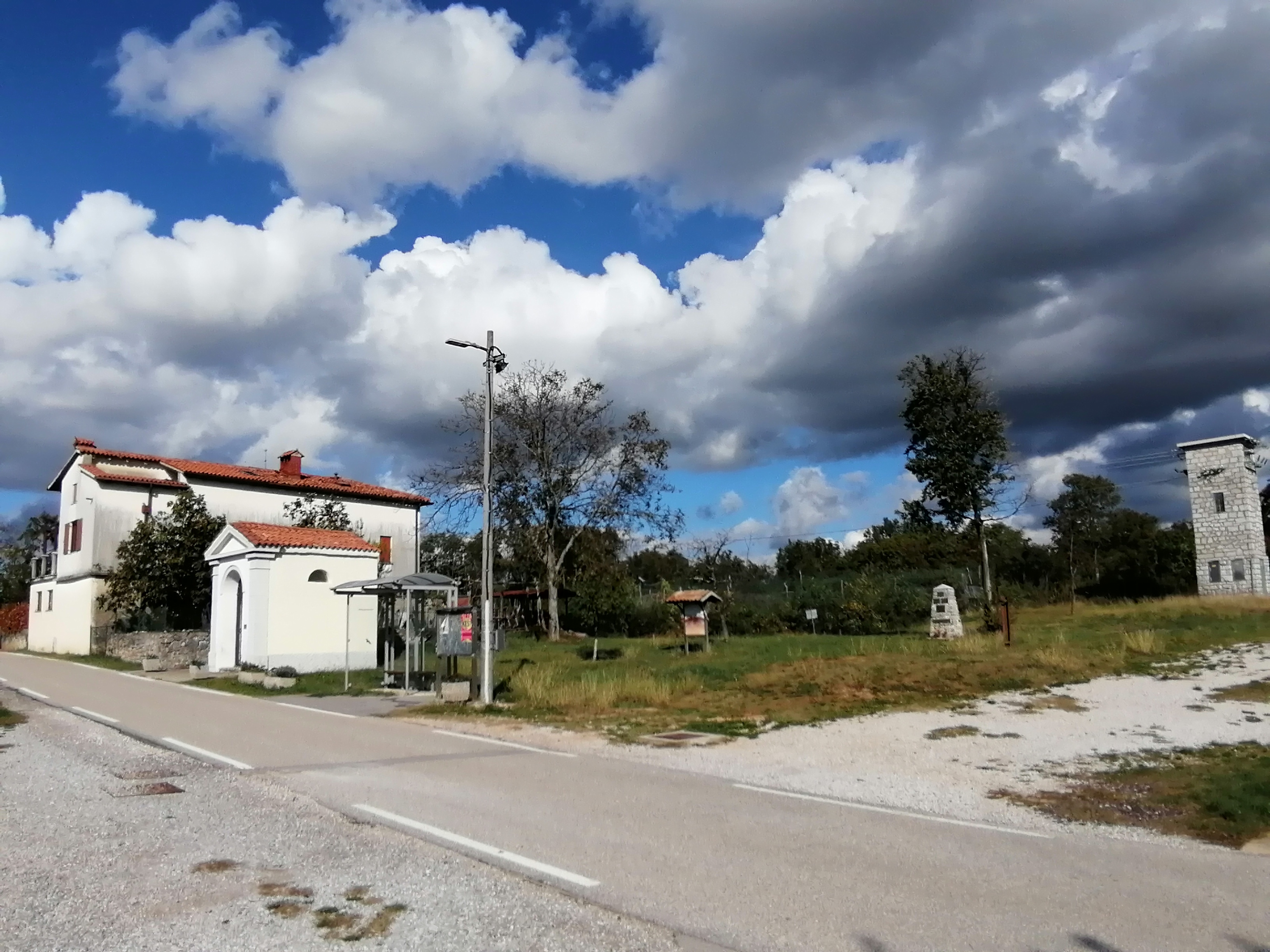

- Location in Slovenia
- Coordinates: 45°50′27.98″N 13°36′31.77″E
- Country: Slovenia
- Traditional region: Littoral
- Statistical region: Gorizia
- Municipality: Miren-Kostanjevica

Area
  - Total: 1.18 km^{2} (0.46 sq mi)
- Elevation: 210 m (690 ft)

Population (2002)
  - Total: 23

Hudi Log (pronounced [ˈxuːdi ˈloːk]) is a small settlement in the Municipality of Miren-Kostanjevica in the Littoral region of Slovenia, close to the border with Italy.
