= Bilje, Miren-Kostanjevica =

Bilje

- Location in Slovenia
- Coordinates: 45°53′47.55″N 13°38′49.22″E
- Country: Slovenia
- Traditional region: Littoral
- Statistical region: Gorizia
- Municipality: Miren-Kostanjevica

Area
  - Total: 2.18 km^{2} (0.84 sq mi)
- Elevation: 51.7 m (170 ft)

Population (2021)
  - Total: 1,271

Bilje (pronounced [ˈbiːljɛ]; Italian: Biglia) is a settlement east of Miren in the Municipality of Miren-Kostanjevica in the Littoral region of Slovenia. The hill known as Miren Castle (Slovene: Mirenski grad) rises above the settlement to the south.

== Church ==
Saint Anthony the Hermit Church

The parish church in the settlement is dedicated to Saint Anthony the Hermit and belongs to the Diocese of Capodistria.

== Notable people ==
Notable people that were born or lived in Bilje include the following:

- Damjana Bratuž (1927–2025), pianist, music educator, and professor
- Dean Komel (born 1960), philosopher
- Negovan Nemec (1947–1987), sculptor
