= Opatje Selo =

- Village
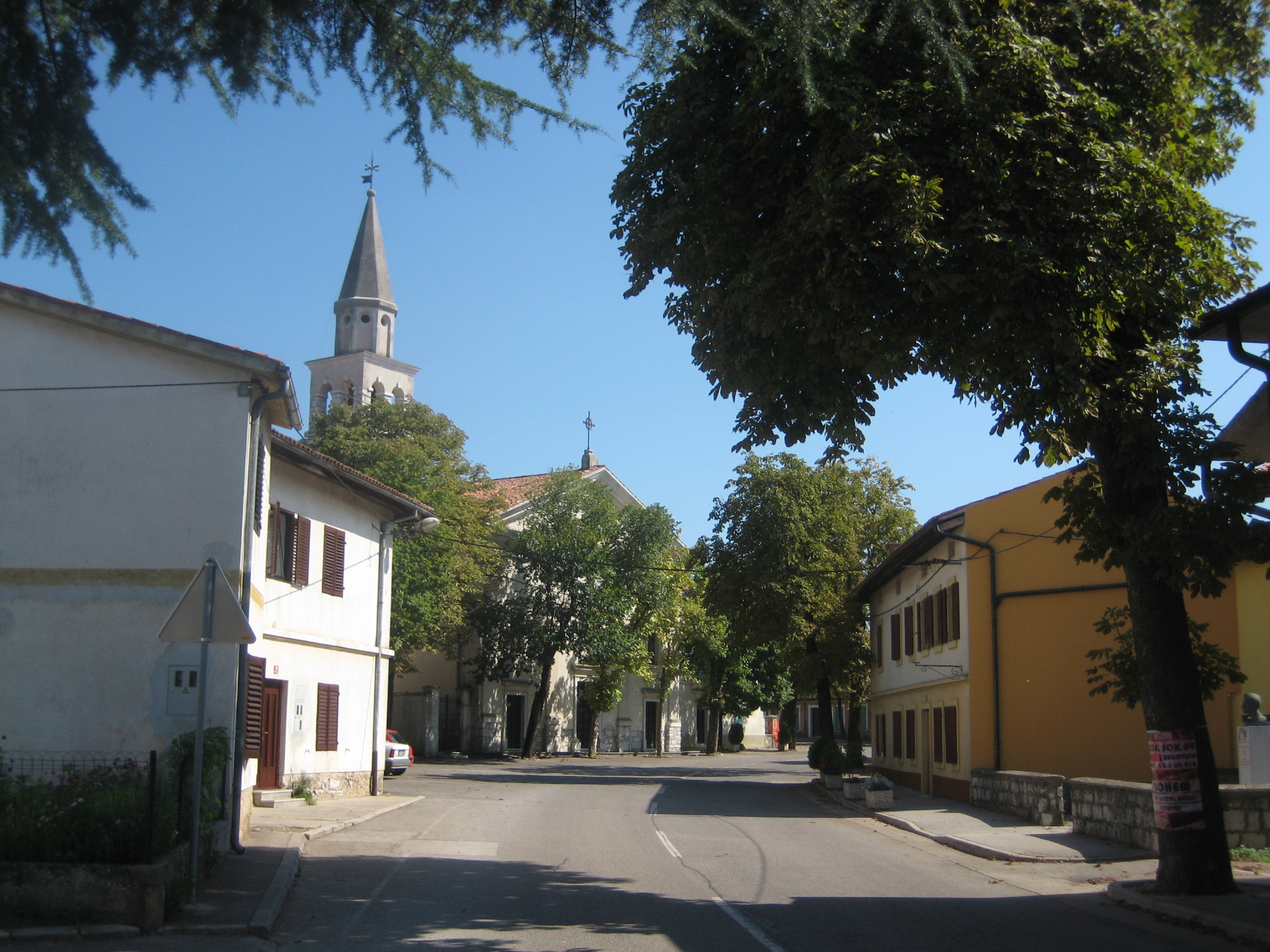

- Location in Slovenia
- Coordinates: 45°51′4.73″N 13°34′57.68″E
- Country: Slovenia
- Traditional region: Littoral
- Statistical region: Gorizia
- Municipality: Miren-Kostanjevica

Area
  - Total: 3.79 km^{2} (1.46 sq mi)
- Elevation: 170.4 m (559 ft)

Population (2002)
  - Total: 377

Opatje Selo (pronounced [ɔˈpaːtjɛ ˈsɛːlɔ]; Slovene: Opatje selo, Italian: Opacchiasella) is a village in the Municipality of Miren-Kostanjevica in the Littoral region of Slovenia, right on the border with Italy. It is located on the Karst Plateau, along an old road leading from Komen to Gorizia. It includes the former hamlet of Mačeče.

== Name ==
Opatje Selo was attested in written sources in 1180 as Sella, 1252 as Sedla, 1275 as Otaeasela, and 1494 as Appatzell. The name Opatje Selo means 'abbot's village' in Slovene. The name derives from ownership of the village by the Benedictine Abbey of Rosazzo.

Locally, the village is known as Opačja sela or Opatsela. Because of the frequency of two surnames, the northern half of the village is known as Marušičev konec 'the Marušič part' and the southern half as Pahorjev konec 'the Pahor part'.

== History ==
During World War I, the Battles of the Isonzo between Austria-Hungary and Italy took place here. The houses were rebuilt after the war, and water mains were installed in 1921.

== Church ==
The parish church in the settlement is dedicated to Saint Andrew and belongs to the Diocese of Koper.

== Notable people ==
Notable people that were born or lived in Opatje Selo include:

- Darko Marušič (a.k.a. Blaž, 1919–1943), communist activist and People's Hero of Yugoslavia
- Drago Marušič (1884–1964), Slovene and Yugoslav politician
