= Kostanjevica na Krasu =

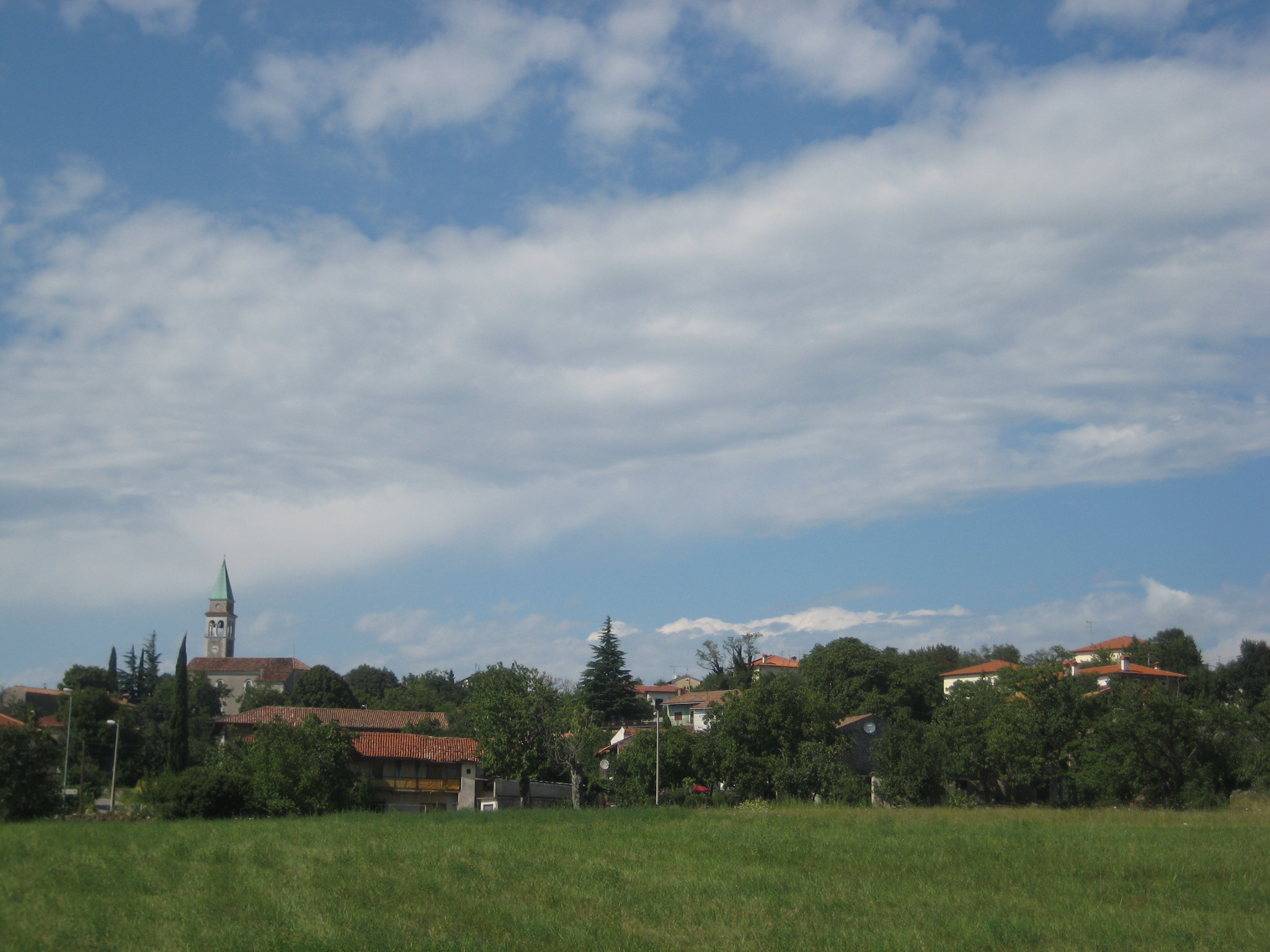

- Location in Slovenia
- Coordinates: 45°50′33.7″N 13°38′37.23″E
- Country: Slovenia
- Traditional region: Littoral
- Statistical region: Gorizia
- Municipality: Miren-Kostanjevica

Area
  - Total: 14.34 km^{2} (5.54 sq mi)
- Elevation: 269.7 m (885 ft)

Population (2002)
  - Total: 317

Kostanjevica na Krasu (pronounced [kɔˈstaːnjɛʋitsa na ˈkɾaːsu]; Italian: Castagnevizza) is one of the main settlements and the administrative centre of the Municipality of Miren-Kostanjevica in the Littoral region of Slovenia. It is located in the northwestern part of the Karst Plateau, not far from Nova Gorica and the border with Italy.

== Name ==
Kostanjevica was attested in written records in 1350 as Costangnawicz. Like other settlements that share the name (e.g., Kostanjevica, Kostanjevica na Krki), it is derived from the Slovene common noun kostanj 'chestnut', referring to the local vegetation. The name was changed to Kostanjevica na Krasu (literally, 'Kostanjevica on the Karst Plateau') in 1952. During the interwar period it was known as Castagnevizza del Carso in Italian.

== History ==
Belonging to Austrian Littoral, it was part of County of Gorizia and Gradisca. During First World War, it was destroyed and its settlers were forced to leave it, sharing the destiny of many Slovene refugees affected by the Battles of the Isonzo. Italy annexed it after the dissolution of Austria-Hungary and during forced Italianization renamed it Castagnevizza. During the Second World War it was burned by the German Army on 29 September 1944. After the Second World War a new village, very different from the former one, was built on the site according to the plans of the architect Max Fabiani.

== Church ==
The parish church in the settlement is dedicated to Saint Martin and belongs to the Diocese of Koper.

== Notable people ==
Notable people that were born or lived in Kostanjevica na Krasu include:

- Igor Torkar (pen name of Boris Fakin, 1913–2004), writer and poet
