= 8th Field Artillery Regiment "Pasubio" =

Active Italian Army self-propelled artillery unit

- 8° Reggimento Artiglieria Terrestre "Pasubio"
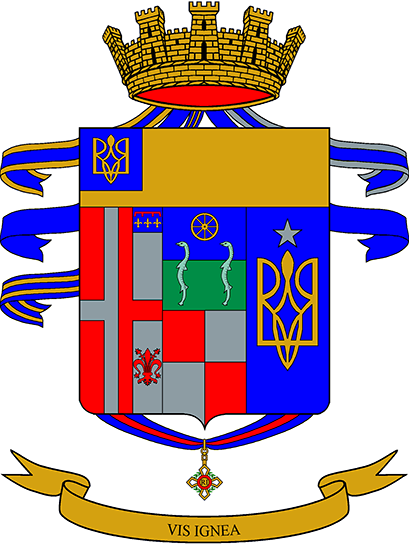
- Regimental coat of arms
- Active: 1 July 1860 – 8 Sept. 1943; 1 Jan. 1947 – today
- Country: Italy
- Branch: Italian Army
- Part of: Bersaglieri Brigade "Garibaldi"
- Garrison/HQ: Persano
- Motto: "Vis ignea"
- Anniversaries: 15 June 1918 – Second Battle of the Piave River
- Decorations: 1× Military Order of Italy; 1× Gold Medal of Military Valor; 1× Silver Medal of Military Valor; 2× Bronze Medals of Military Valor; 1× Bronze Medal of Army Valor; 1× Italian Red Cross Bronze Medal of Merit

Insignia
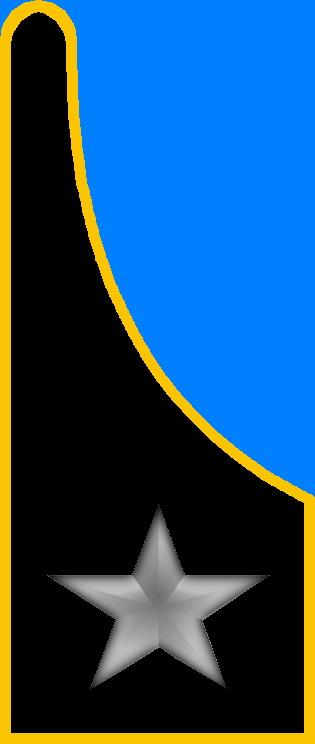
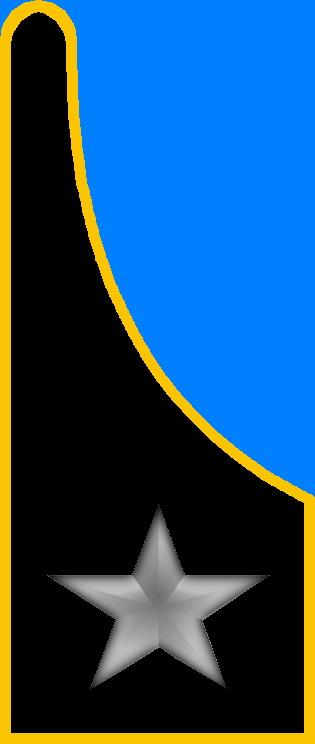
- Regimental gorget patches

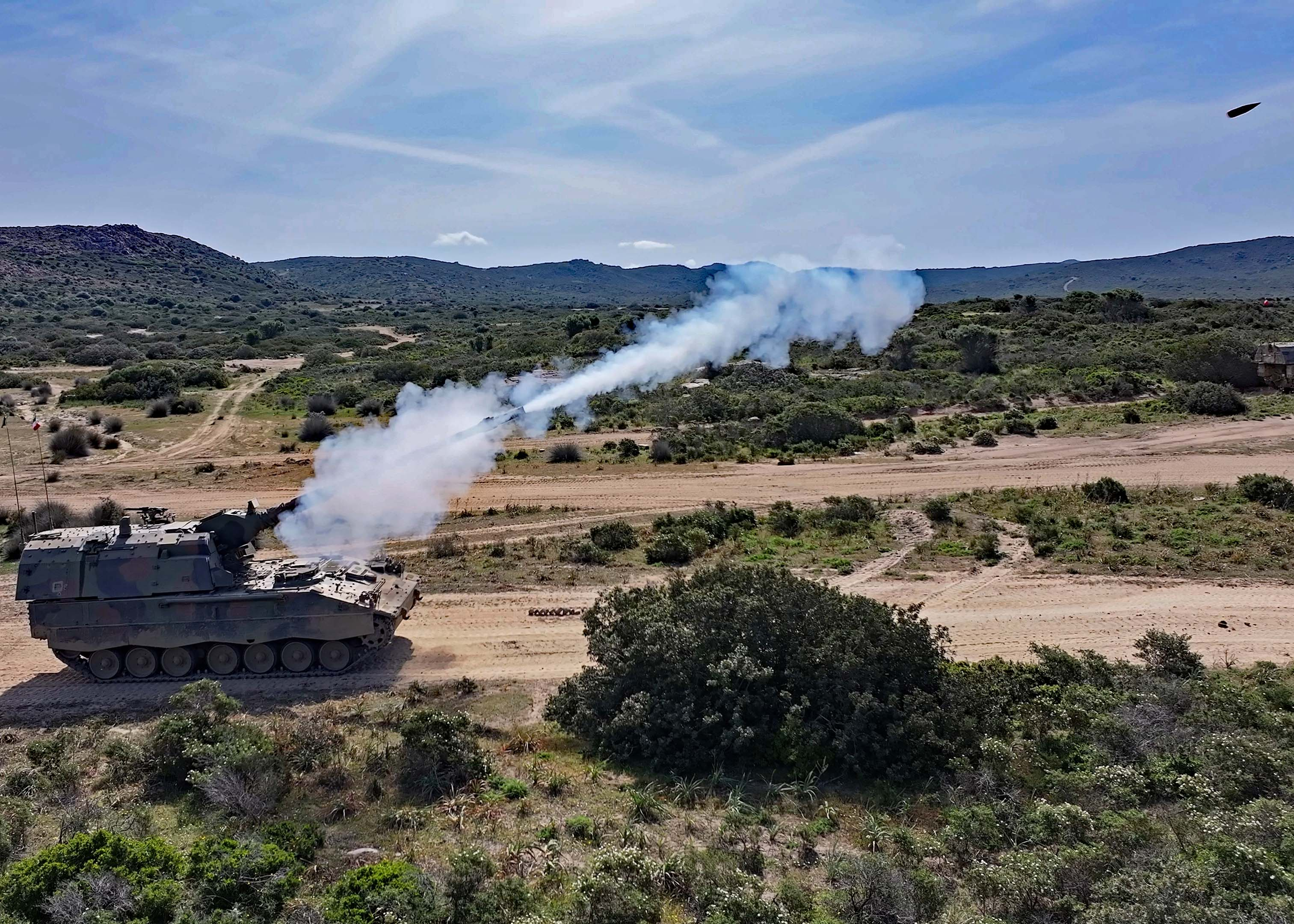
8th Field Artillery Regiment "Pasubio" PzH 2000 howitzer during exercise "Alfiere d’Acciaio" 2025

The 8th Field Artillery Regiment "Pasubio" (Italian: 8° Reggimento Artiglieria Terrestre "Pasubio") is a field artillery regiment of the Italian Army. Today the regiment is based in Persano in Campania and assigned to the Bersaglieri Brigade "Garibaldi". The regiment was formed in 1860 by the Royal Sardinian Army and participated the same year in the Sardinian campaign in Central and Southern Italy. In 1861 the regiment joined the Royal Italian Army and in 1866 it fought in the Third Italian War of Independence. During World War I the regiment served on the Italian front. In 1935 the regiment was assigned to the 9th Infantry Division "Pasubio", which in July 1941 was assigned to the Italian Expeditionary Corps in Russia, which was deployed to the Eastern Front of World War II. In 1942 the division and regiment were destroyed during the Soviet Operation Little Saturn and the survivors of the division were dispersed by invading German forces after the announcement of the Armistice of Cassibile on 8 September 1943.

The regiment was reformed in 1947 and assigned to the Infantry Division "Friuli". In 1960 the regiment was transferred to the V Army Corps and in 1964 to the Cavalry Brigade "Pozzuolo del Friuli". In 1975 the regiment was reduced to 8th Self-propelled Field Artillery Group "Pasubio" and assigned to the Armored Brigade "Vittorio Veneto". After the end of the Cold War the group returned to the Cavalry Brigade "Pozzuolo del Friuli" and reorganized as a regiment. In 2001 the regiment took over the personnel, materiel, and base of the 11th Self-propelled Field Artillery Regiment "Teramo" in Persano and joined the Bersaglieri Brigade "Garibaldi". The regimental anniversary falls, as for all Italian Army artillery regiments, on June 15, the beginning of the Second Battle of the Piave River in 1918.

This article is about the Royal Italian Army's 8th Field Artillery Regiment, which was a support unit assigned to a division-level command. This regiment is unrelated to the 8th Heavy Field Artillery Regiment, which was a support unit assigned to a corps-level command, and unrelated to the 8th Heavy Artillery Regiment, which was a support unit assigned to an army-level command.

== History ==
=== Italian Wars of Independence ===
After the Second Italian War of Independence the Kingdom of Sardinia annexed on 22 March 1860 the Royal Provinces of Emilia and the Grand Duchy of Tuscany. Consequently, on 25 March 1860, the artillery units of the annexed territories were integrated into the Royal Sardinian Army: six field batteries, six fortress companies, and one workers company from the Tuscan Army, and nine field batteries, six fortress companies, and one workers company from the Emilian Army. The influx of artillery units and the growth of units in the runup to and during the war necessitated a new organization of the Piedmontese artillery, which at the time consisted of the Workers Regiment, the Fortress Artillery Regiment, the 1st Field Artillery Regiment, and the 2nd Field Artillery Regiment.

On 17 June 1860, which today is celebrated as the founding date of the Italian Army's Artillery Arm, four new regiments were ordered to be formed on 1 July 1860: the 3rd Regiment — Fortress Regiment, the 4th Regiment — Fortress Regiment, the 7th Regiment — Field Regiment, and the 8th Regiment — Field Regiment; while on the same day the Workers Regiment was to be renamed 1st Regiment — Workers Regiment, with the Fortress Artillery Regiment destined to become the 2nd Regiment — Fortress Regiment, and the 1st Field Artillery Regiment and 2nd Field Artillery Regiment, slated to be renamed 5th Regiment — Field Regiment and 6th Regiment — Field Regiment.

On 1 July 1860 the 8th Regiment — Field Regiment was formed in Florence and received seven field batteries from the former Piedmontese 2nd Field Artillery Regiment, as well as one Tuscan field battery and three Emilian field batteries. One of the Piedmontese companies had participated in 1848 in the First Italian War of Independence and fought in the Siege of Peschiera, where it earned a Bronze Medal of Military Valor, which was affixed to the regiment's flag and is depicted on the regiment's coat of arms. The battery then fought in the Battle of Pastrengo and the Battle of Santa Lucia. In 1849 the battery fought in the Siege of Mantova and the Battle of Novara. The battery had also participated in the Second Italian War of Independence.

Immediately after its formation the regiment's batteries participated in the Sardinian campaign in Central and Southern Italy, where they fought in the Battle of Castelfidardo, the Siege of Ancona, the Battle of Mola, and the Siege of Gaeta. In the Battle of Mola the regiment's 6th Battery earned a Bronze Medal of Military Valor, which was affixed to the regiment's flag and is depicted on the regiment's coat of arms. After the Kingdom of the Two Sicilies was annexed to the Kingdom of Italy in March 1861 the regiment moved from Florence to Naples. By then the regiment consisted of 16 field batteries.

On 8 March September 1863 the regiment ceded four batteries to help form the 10th Artillery Regiment — Field Regiment. In 1866 the regiment participated in the Third Italian War of Independence and after the annexation of the remaining parts of the Kingdom of Lombardy–Venetia the regiment moved in 1867 from Naples to Padua and one year later to Verona. In September 1870 the regiment's 1st, 2nd and 11th batteries participated in the capture of Rome and on 13 November of the same year the regiment was renamed 8th Artillery Regiment and fielded now a mix of fortress companies and field batteries. On 1 January 1871 the regiment ceded three field batteries to help form the 11th Artillery Regiment. On 30 September 1873 the regiment ceded its remaining four fortress companies to help form the 13th Fortress Artillery Regiment. On 29 June 1882 the regiment was renamed 8th Field Artillery Regiment.

On 1 January 1884 the regiment formed two horse artillery brigades, with each brigade consisting of two batteries and on 1 November of the same year the regiment ceded two of its field batteries to help from the 11th Field Artillery Regiment. On 1 November 1887 the two horse artillery brigades were used form the Horse Artillery Regiment in Milan. On 1 November 1888 the regiment ceded eight batteries and one train company to help form the 20th Field Artillery Regiment. On 1 October 1891 the regiment reorganized two of its field batteries as mountain batteries, which the regiment exchanged on 31 December 1893 with the 5th Field Artillery Regiment for two field batteries. In 1895–96 the regiment provided three officers and 79 troops to augment units deployed to Eritrea for the First Italo-Ethiopian War. During the Italo-Turkish War in 1911–12 the regiment provided 11 officers and 566 troops to augment units deployed for the war. On 1 January 1915 the regiment ceded its II Group to help form the 29th Field Artillery Regiment.

=== World War I ===
At the outbreak of World War I the regiment was assigned to the I Army Corps as the corps' artillery regiment. At the time the regiment consisted of a command, three groups with a combined eight batteries equipped with 75/27 mod. 06 field guns, and a depot. During the war the regiment's depot in Verona formed the command of the 44th Field Artillery Regiment and the LXI Heavy Field Howitzer Group. During the war the regiment was initially deployed in the Cadore region, where it fought in the Misurina sector, before moving in fall 1915 to the Falzarego sector, where the regiment participated in attempts to conquer the Sass de Stria. In 1916 the regiment moved to the Col di Lana and from there to Colbricon. By summer the regiment was deployed on Monte Piana and then on Monte Forame. In 1917 the regiment moved to the Isonzo front and was deployed on the Fajtji hrib. Afterwards the regiment moved to the area of Opatje Selo, and was deployed in the Val Natisone. After the Battle of Caporetto the regiment's I Group was annihilated by the advancing Austro-Hungarian armies at San Daniele del Friuli. The rest of the regiment retreated to the Piave river and was then transferred to the Monte Grappa massif, where it fought on Monfenera during the Battle of Monte Grappa. In June 1918 the regiment was at Monastir during the Second Battle of the Piave River. In fall 1918 the regiment fought in the Battle of Vittorio Veneto, during which the regiment crossed the Piave river and advanced to the Tagliamento river.

In 1926 the regiment was assigned to the 9th Territorial Division of Verona and consisted of a command, one group with 100/17 mod. 14 howitzers, two groups with 75/27 mod. 06 field guns, one group with mule-carried 75/13 mod. 15 mountain guns, and a depot. In January 1935 the 9th Territorial Division of Verona was renamed 9th Infantry Division "Pasubio" and consequently the regiment was renamed 8th Artillery Regiment "Pasubio". In 1935 the regiment provided 21 officers and 593 enlisted to augment units deployed for the Second Italo-Ethiopian War. On 4 September 1939 the regiment ceded a group with 75/13 mod. 15 mountain guns to help reform the 33rd Artillery Regiment "Acqui".

=== World War II ===
On 10 June 1940, the day Italy entered World War II, the regiment consisted of a command, command unit, one group with 100/17 mod. 14 howitzers, two groups with 75/27 mod. 06 field guns, and an anti-aircraft battery with 20/65 mod. 35 anti-aircraft guns. The regiment was assigned to the 9th Infantry Division "Pasubio", which also included the 79th Infantry Regiment "Pasubio" and 80th Infantry Regiment "Pasubio". In April 1941 the division took part in the Invasion of Yugoslavia. In July 1941 the division was assigned to the Italian Expeditionary Corps in Russia and by 10 August the division was in combat against Soviet forces. In September 1941 the division participated in the Battle of Kyiv, capturing and holding a bridgehead on the eastern side of the Dnipro river. In October 1941 the division played a significant role in the capture of Stalino and in November the division captured Horlivka.

On 1 September 1941 the regiment's depot in Verona formed the 108th Motorized Artillery Regiment. In winter 1941 the division was engaged in defensive operations and in summer 1942 it participated in Case Blue — the German offensive towards Stalingrad and the Caucasus. In August the division reached the Don river, where it remained until 11 December 1942, when the Soviets commenced Operation Little Saturn. By 16 December 1942 the collapse of the entire Italian front-line was underway and the heavily decimated Italian units began their retreat. At first the retreating units tried to avoid, and then had to break a Soviet encirclement. On 15 January 1943 the fight to break through the Soviet lines started and two days later the last 2,000 men of the once 15,000 troops of the division escaped the encirclement. On 20 January 1943 a count of the survivors showed that of the 86 officers, 110 non-commissioned officers and 1,678 soldiers the 8th Artillery Regiment "Pasubio" counted before Operation Little Saturn only 15 officers, 34 non-commissioned officers and 395 soldiers had survived the battle. The division's remnants were repatriated and assembled at the end of June 1943 in Grazzanise in Campania, where the process of rebuilding the division and its regiments began. After the announcement of the Armistice of Cassibile on 8 September 1943 the division and its regiments were disbanded by invading German forces.

For its conduct and bravery in the campaign in the Soviet Union in summer and fall 1941 the regiment was awarded a Silver Medal of Military Valor, which was affixed to the regiment's flag and is depicted on the regiment's coat of arms. For its bravery and sacrifice during Operation Little Saturn the regiment was awarded Italy's highest military honor, a Gold Medal of Military Valor, which was affixed to the regiment's flag and is depicted on the regiment's coat of arms.

=== Cold War ===
On 1 January 1947 the 8th Field Artillery Regiment was reformed in Vicenza. The regiment was assigned to the Infantry Division "Friuli" and consisted of a command, a command unit, and two groups with QF 25-pounder field guns, which had both been ceded by the 35th Field Artillery Regiment. A few months later a third group with QF 25-pounder field guns was formed and in 1948 the regiment moved from Vicenza to Livorno. On 1 January 1951 the Infantry Division "Friuli" included the following artillery regiments:

- Infantry Division "Friuli", in Florence
  - 8th Field Artillery Regiment, in Livorno
  - 9th Anti-tank Field Artillery Regiment, in Lucca
  - 35th Field Artillery Regiment, in Rimini
  - 3rd Light Anti-aircraft Artillery Regiment, in Pisa

In 1952 and 1953 the regiment replaced its British equipment with American equipment and by 1 December 1953 the regiment consisted of the following units:

- 8th Field Artillery Regiment, in Livorno
  - Command Unit
  - I Group with M101 105 mm howitzers
  - II Group with M101 105 mm howitzers
  - III Group with M101 105 mm howitzers
  - IV Group with M114 155 mm howitzers
  - V Light Anti-aircraft Group with 40/56 anti-aircraft autocannons

On 1 July 1955 the regiment formed a Light Aircraft Section with L-21B artillery observation planes, which in 1957 was expanded to Light Aircraft Unit. In 1956 the Infantry Division "Friuli" transferred its Artillery Specialists Unit to the regiment, which was expanded on 1 January 1958 to Artillery Specialists Battery. One month later, in February 1958, the regiment underwent a radical transformation and consisted afterwards of a command, a command unit, the I Mixed Group, which fielded two batteries with M101 105 mm howitzers and one light anti-aircraft battery with 40/56 autocannons, the II Mixed Group, which fielded one battery with M101 105 mm howitzers and one battery with M114 155 mm howitzers, the Light Aircraft Unit, and the Artillery Specialists Battery, which was disbanded in 1959. On 16 April 1960 the I Mixed Group was disbanded, while the II Mixed Group was reorganized and renamed Field Artillery Group "Friuli".

On 1 August 1960 the regiment's command and command unit moved from Livorno to Palmanova, where the regiment was reformed as 8th Self-propelled Field Artillery Regiment. The regiment was assigned to the V Army Corps, which transferred two previously autonomous groups to the regiment: the II Self-propelled Field Artillery Group with Sexton self-propelled howitzers in Banne and the IV Self-propelled Field Artillery Group with Sexton self-propelled howitzers in Palmanova. On 1 July 1962 the IV Group was renumbered as I Group. In 1963 the regiment replaced its Sexton self-propelled howitzers with M7 Priest self-propelled guns. In 1964 the regiment was transferred from the V Army Corps to the Cavalry Brigade "Pozzuolo del Friuli". On 1 September 1965 the regiment received the VI Self-propelled Field Artillery Group, which had been based in Modena and had been assigned to the VI Army Corps. Upon entering the regiment the group was renumbered as III Group and moved at Banne. In 1972 the regiment replaced its M7 Priest self-propelled guns with M109G self-propelled howitzers.

During the 1975 army reform the army disbanded the regimental level and newly independent battalions and groups were granted for the first time their own flags. On 30 September 1975 the regiment's was disbanded and the next day the regiment's I Group in Visco was renamed 120th Self-propelled Field Artillery Group "Po" and assigned to the Armored Brigade "Pozzuolo del Friuli". On the same day the regiment's II Group and III Group in Banne were merged and formed the 8th Self-propelled Field Artillery Group "Pasubio", which was assigned to the Armored Brigade "Vittorio Veneto". The group consisted of a command, a command and services battery, and three batteries with M109G self-propelled howitzers.

On 12 November 1976 the President of the Italian Republic Giovanni Leone assigned with decree 846 the flag and traditions of the 8th Artillery Regiment "Pasubio" to the group. At the time the group fielded 477 men (38 officers, 62 non-commissioned officers, and 377 soldiers).

For its conduct and work after the 1976 Friuli earthquake the group was awarded a Bronze Medal of Army Valor, which was affixed to the group's flag and added to the group's coat of arms.

=== Recent times ===
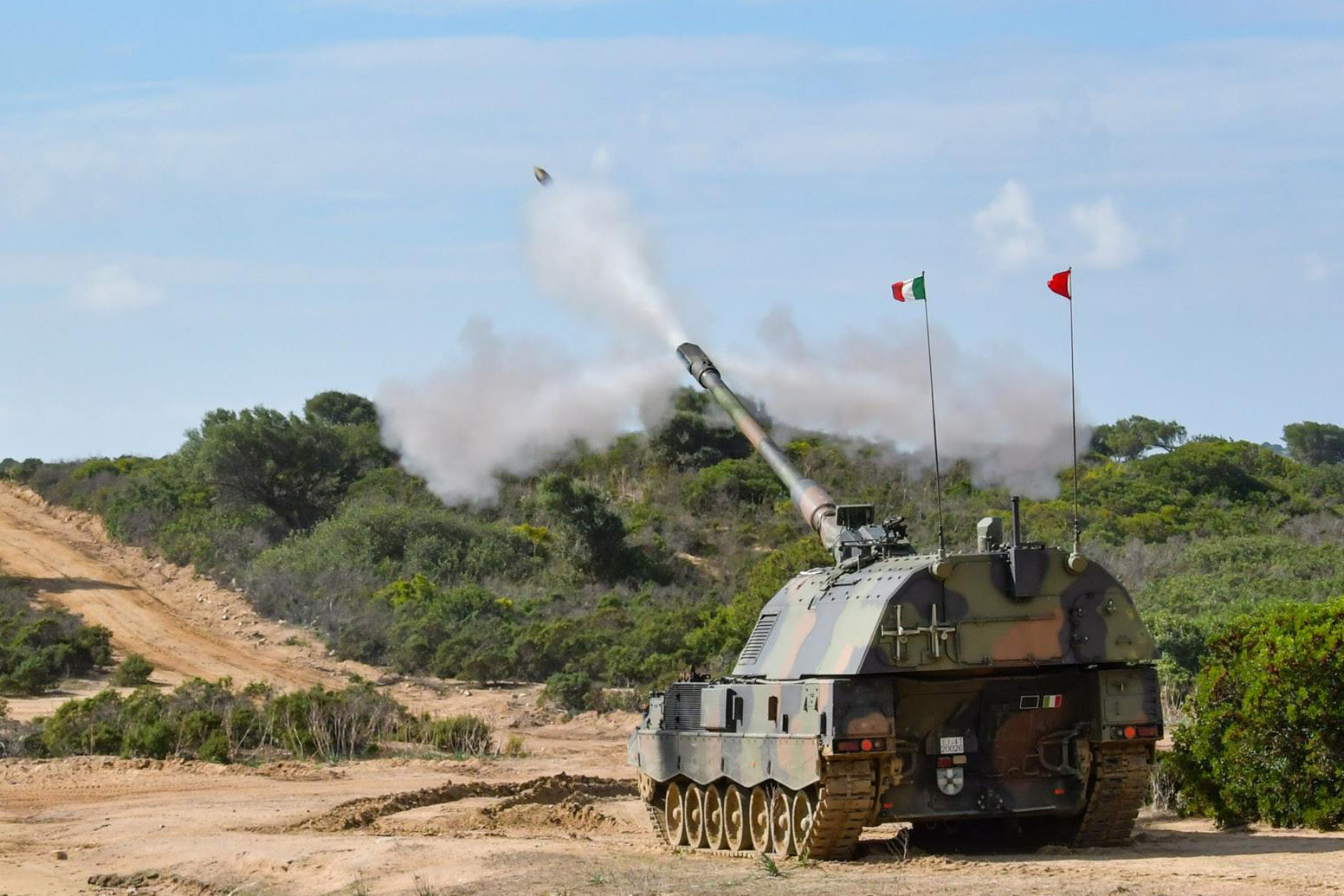
8th Field Artillery Regiment "Pasubio" PzH 2000 self-propelled howitzer during an exercise 2022

After the end of the Cold War the Italian Army began to draw down its forces and on 31 July 1991 the Mechanized Brigade "Vittorio Veneto" was disbanded and the 8th Self-propelled Field Artillery Group "Pasubio" was transferred to the Cavalry Brigade "Pozzuolo del Friuli". On 17 September 1992 the group lost its autonomy and the next day entered the reformed 8th Self-propelled Field Artillery Regiment "Pasubio". In October 1993 the regiment moved from Banne to Sgonico and in 1996 it moved to Udine. The same year the regiment received FH-70 155 mm howitzers and was renamed 8th Field Artillery Regiment "Pasubio".

On 30 September 2001 the batteries of the 8th Field Artillery Regiment "Pasubio" in Udine were disbanded and the flag of the regiment was transferred to Persano, where the next day, on 1 October 2001, it supplanted the flag of the 11th Self-propelled Field Artillery Regiment "Teramo". The 8th Field Artillery Regiment "Pasubio was now assigned to the Bersaglieri Brigade "Garibaldi" and equipped with M109L self-propelled howitzers. In October 2008 the regiment replaced its M109L self-propelled howitzers with modern PzH 2000 self-propelled howitzers.

== Organization ==
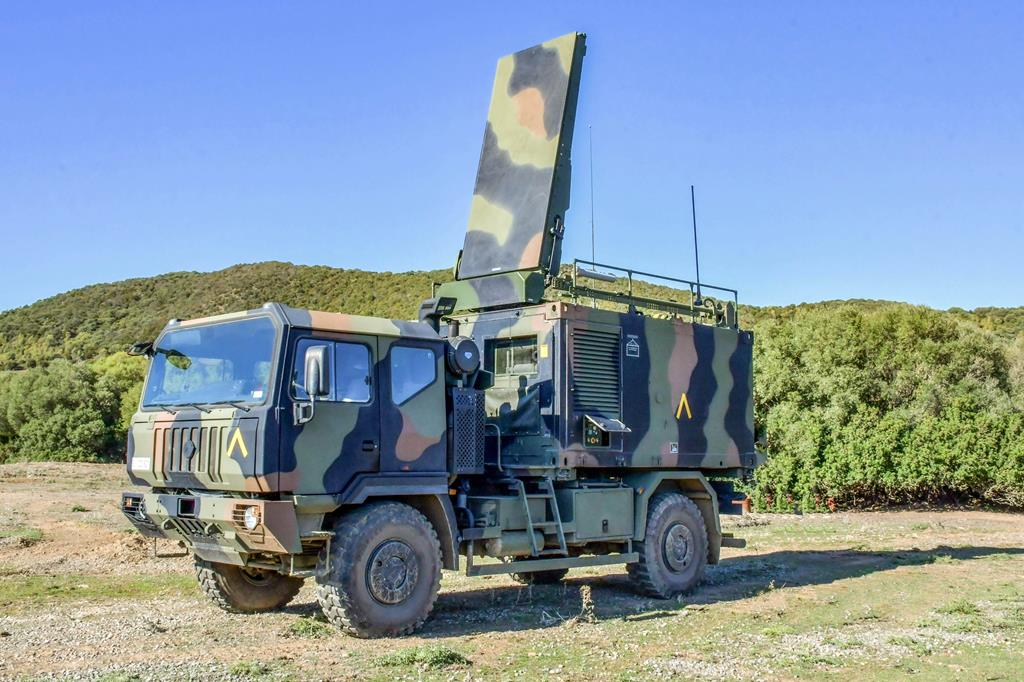
8th Field Artillery Regiment "Pasubio" ARTHUR radar during an exercise in 2022

As of 2023 the 8th Field Artillery Regiment "Pasubio" is organized as follows:

- 8th Field Artillery Regiment "Pasubio", in Persano
  - Command and Logistic Support Battery
  - Surveillance, Target Acquisition and Tactical Liaison Battery
  - 1st Self-propelled Group
    - 1st Howitzer Battery
    - 2nd Howitzer Battery
    - 3rd Howitzer Battery
    - Fire and Technical Support Battery

The regiment is equipped with PzH 2000 self-propelled howitzers. The Surveillance, Target Acquisition and Tactical Liaison Battery is equipped with RQ-11B Raven unmanned aerial vehicles and ARTHUR counter-battery radars.

== See also ==
- Bersaglieri Brigade "Garibaldi"
