= 11th Heavy Field Artillery Regiment (Italy) =

Inactive Italian Army artillery unit

- 11° Reggimento Artiglieria Pesante Campale
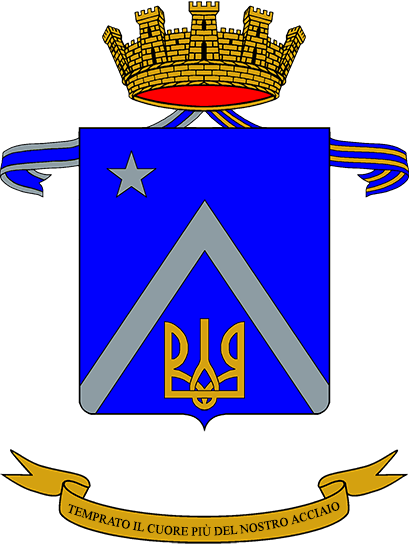
- Regimental coat of arms
- Active: 1 Aug. 1920 — 30. Nov. 1926; 10 Nov. 1939 — 8 Sept. 1943; 1 Oct. 1976 — 30 Sept. 2001
- Country: Italy
- Branch: Italian Army
- Part of: Bersaglieri Brigade "Garibaldi"
- Garrison/HQ: Persano
- Motto(s): "Temprato il cuore più del nostro acciaio"
- Anniversaries: 15 June 1918 - Second Battle of the Piave River
- Decorations: 1x Silver Medal of Military Valor; 1x Bronze Medal of Army Valor

Insignia
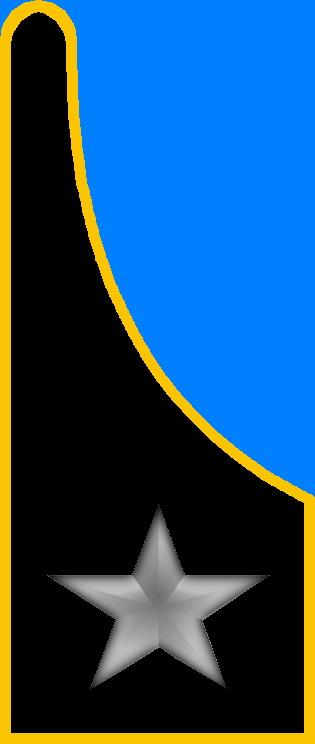
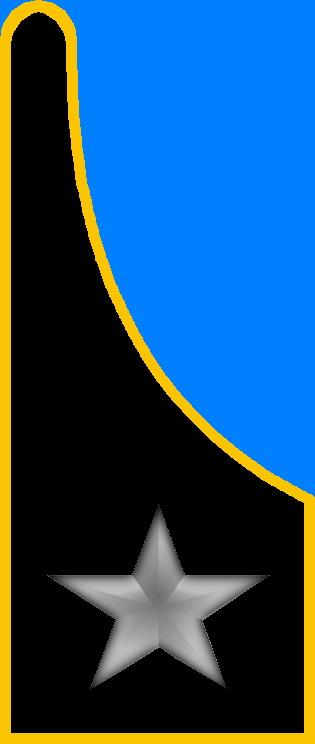
- Regimental gorget patches

The 11th Heavy Field Artillery Regiment (Italian: 11° Reggimento Artiglieria Pesante Campale) is an inactive artillery regiment of the Italian Army, which was based in Persano in Campania and assigned to the Bersaglieri Brigade "Garibaldi". Originally an artillery regiment of the Royal Italian Army, the regiment was formed in 1920 with pre-existing groups, which had fought during World War I on the Italian front. The regiment was disbanded in 1926 and reformed in 1939. During World War II the regiment formed an army corps artillery grouping, which served in 1942-43 with the Italian 8th Army on the Eastern Front. The regiment and its grouping were disbanded by invading German forces after the announcement of the Armistice of Cassibile on 8 September 1943.

In 1976 the 11th Heavy Field Artillery Group "Teramo" was formed and assigned the flag and traditions of the 11th Heavy Field Artillery Regiment. The group was assigned to the Artillery Command of the Southern Military Region until it was transferred to the Mechanized Brigade "Pinerolo" in 1981 and renamed 11th Field Artillery Group "Teramo". In 1991 the group was transferred to the 8th Bersaglieri Brigade "Garibaldi" and one year later, in 1992, the group entered the reformed 11th Self-propelled Field Artillery Regiment "Teramo". In 2001 the regiment was disbanded and its flag transferred to the Shrine of the Flags in the Vittoriano in Rome. The regiment's personnel, materiel, and base in Persano, were taken over by the 8th Self-propelled Field Artillery Regiment "Pasubio".

The regimental anniversary falls, as for all Italian Army artillery regiments, on June 15, the beginning of the Second Battle of the Piave River in 1918. This article is about the Royal Italian Army's 11th Heavy Field Artillery Regiment, which was a support unit assigned to a corps-level command. This regiment is unrelated to the 11th Field Artillery Regiment, which was a support unit assigned to a division-level command.

== History ==
On 1 August 1920 the 11th Heavy Field Artillery Regiment was formed in Acqui. The new regiment was formed with the personnel of the disbanded 23rd Field Artillery Regiment. The regiment consisted of a depot and four groups, which had fought in World War I on the Italian front. On 30 November 1926 the 11th Heavy Field Artillery Regiment was disbanded and its groups assigned to other units: the regimental command was used to reform the 29th Field Artillery Regiment, while three of the regiment's groups were transferred to the 2nd Anti-aircraft Artillery Center. The regiment's mixed group, which was based in Civitavecchia, was transferred to the 8th Heavy Field Artillery Regiment.

=== World War II ===
On 10 November 1939 the regiment was reformed as 11th Army Corps Artillery Regiment in Cormons. The regiment consisted of a command, a command unit, three groups with 105/32 heavy field guns, and a depot. The regiment was assigned to the XI Army Corps in Udine. On 10 February 1940 the 17th Army Corps Artillery Grouping, which had been formed on 10 September 1939 by the 6th Army Corps Artillery Regiment, was merged into the 11th Army Corps Artillery Regiment. During the war the regiment's depot in Cormons formed and mobilized the following unit commands:

- 11th Army Corps Artillery Grouping
- LI Cannons Group with 105/32 heavy field guns
- LII Cannons Group with 105/32 heavy field guns
- LIII Cannons Group with 105/32 heavy field guns
- LVIII Cannons Group with 105/32 heavy field guns
- CXII Howitzers Group with 149/13 heavy howitzers
- CXVII Howitzers Group with 149/13 heavy howitzers
- CLIX Howitzers Group with 149/19 heavy howitzers
- CLX Howitzers Group with 149/19 heavy howitzers
- CLXV Howitzers Group with 149/19 heavy howitzers
- 11th Army Corps Specialists Unit

The regiment's depot also formed and mobilized the batteries for the group commands. The groups operated either under command of army corps artillery groupings or as autonomous units. The depot was disbanded by invading German forces after the announcement of the Armistice of Cassibile on 8 September 1943.

- 11th Army Corps Artillery Grouping: the grouping was mobilized on 1 February 1940 and consisted of a command, a command unit, the LI, LII, and LIII cannons groups with 105/32 heavy field guns, CXVII Howitzers Group with 149/13 heavy howitzers, the CXLVII Howitzers Group with 149/28 heavy field howitzers, and the 11th Army Corps Specialists Unit. In this configuration the grouping participated in April 1941 in the invasion of Yugoslavia. In spring 1942 the grouping was assigned to the Italian 8th Army, which was deployed in summer 1942 to the Eastern Front. The grouping was assigned to the Alpine Army Corps and participated in Case Blue — the German offensive towards Stalingrad and the Caucasus. At the time the 11th Army Corps Artillery Grouping consisted of the following units:

- 11th Army Corps Artillery Grouping
  - LI Group
    - 3× Batteries — 4× 105/32 heavy field guns per battery
  - LII Group
    - 3× Batteries — 4× 105/32 heavy field guns per battery
  - LIII Group
    - 3× Batteries — 4× 105/32 heavy field guns per battery
  - CXVII Group
    - 3× Batteries — 4× 149/13 heavy howitzers per battery
  - 11th Army Corps Specialists Unit
  - 39th Anti-aircraft Battery — 8× 20/65 mod. 35 anti-aircraft guns
  - 41st Anti-aircraft Battery — 8× 20/65 mod. 35 anti-aircraft guns

In August the Alpine Army Corps reached the Don river, where it remained until 13 January 1943, when the Soviets began the second stage of Operation Little Saturn and launched the four armies of General Filipp Golikov's Voronezh Front against the Hungarian Second Army on the left flank of the Alpine Army Corps. Within three days the corps found itself flanked on both sides by Soviet armoured and mechanized units and 200 km away from the new Axis lines. On 17 January the commanding general of the corps Lieutenant General Gabriele Nasci ordered a full retreat. About 40,000 men formed two columns, which followed the 2nd Alpine Division "Tridentina" which, supported by a handful of German armored vehicles, led the way westwards to the new Axis front. The Soviets had already occupied every village and bitter battles were fought by the soldiers of the Tridentina to clear the way. On 26 January 1943 the corps' remnants finally broke free from the Soviet encirclement at the Battle of Nikolayevka and reached Axis lines on 1 February 1943. In March 1943 the few survivors of the 11th Army Corps Artillery Grouping were repatriated. The grouping was still in the process of being reformed when German forces disbanded it after the announcement of the Armistice of Cassibile on 8 September 1943.

For its bravery and sacrifice during Operation Little Saturn the 11th Army Corps Artillery Grouping was awarded Italy's second highest military honor, a Silver Medal of Military Valor, which was affixed to the regiment's flag and is depicted on the regiment's coat of arms.

=== Cold War ===
During the 1975 army reform the army disbanded the regimental level and newly independent battalions and groups were granted for the first time their own flags. On 30 September 1976 the 9th Heavy Field Artillery Regiment in Foggia was disbanded and the next day, on 1 October 1976, the regiment's III Group in Persano became an autonomous unit and was renamed 11th Heavy Field Artillery Group "Teramo". The group was named for the city of Teramo in southern Italy and assigned the flag and traditions of the 11th Heavy Field Artillery Regiment. The group consisted of a command, a command and services battery, and three batteries with M114 155 mm howitzers and was assigned to the Artillery Command of the Southern Military Region.

On 12 November 1976 the President of the Italian Republic Giovanni Leone assigned with decree 846 the flag and traditions of the 11th Heavy Field Artillery Regiment to the group. At the time the group fielded 433 men (31 officers, 53 non-commissioned officers, and 349 soldiers).

For its conduct and work after the 1980 Irpinia earthquake the group was awarded a Bronze Medal of Army Valor, which was affixed to the group's flag and is depicted on the group's coats of arms.

On 6 December 1981 the 9th Heavy Field Artillery Regiment was reformed and the 47th Field Artillery Group "Gargano", which had been the artillery group of the Mechanized Brigade "Pinerolo", became the reformed regiment's 3rd Group. On the same date the 11th Heavy Field Artillery Group "Teramo" was transferred from the Southern Military Region's Artillery Command to the Mechanized Brigade "Pinerolo" and renamed 11th Field Artillery Group "Teramo".

=== Recent times ===
On 1 July 1991 the 11th Field Artillery Group "Teramo" was transferred from the Mechanized Brigade "Pinerolo" to the 8th Bersaglieri Brigade "Garibaldi". After the end of the Cold War, the Italian Army disbanded many of its artillery units in the country's Northeast and transferred their equipment to the remaining artillery units. In 1992 the 11th Field Artillery Group "Teramo" received M109G 155 mm self-propelled howitzers and on 10 September of that year the group lost its autonomy and entered the next day the 11th Self-propelled Field Artillery Regiment "Teramo".

On 30 September 2001 the batteries of the 8th Field Artillery Regiment "Pasubio" in Udine were disbanded and the flag of the regiment was transferred to Persano, where the next day, on 1 October 2001, it supplanted the flag of the 11th Self-propelled Field Artillery Regiment "Teramo". Subsequently the flag of the 11th Self-propelled Field Artillery Regiment "Teramo" was transferred to the Shrine of the Flags in the Vittoriano in Rome.
