= Logistic Regiment "Garibaldi" =

Active Italian Army brigade logistics unit

- Reggimento Logistico "Garibaldi"
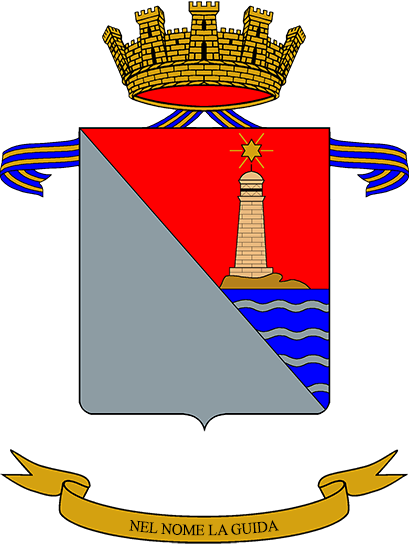
- Regimental coat of arms
- Active: 1 Nov. 1975 — 30 June 1991; 1 July 1991 — today
- Country: Italy
- Branch: Italian Army
- Role: Military logistics
- Part of: Bersaglieri Brigade "Garibaldi"
- Garrison/HQ: Persano
- Motto: "Nel nome la guida"
- Anniversaries: 22 May 1916 - Battle of Asiago
- Decorations: 1× Silver Medal of Army Valor; 1× Bronze Medal of Army Valor; 2× Silver Crosses of Army Merit; 2× Bronze Crosses of Army Merit

Insignia
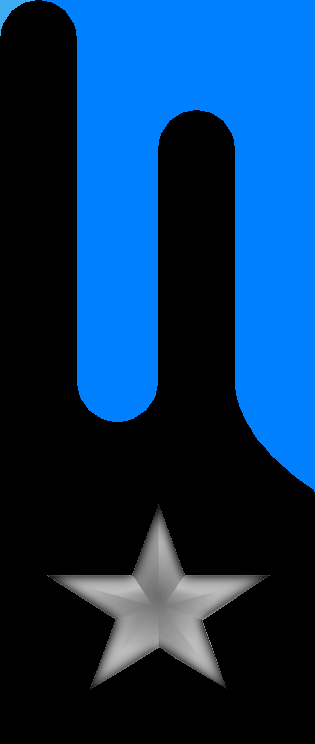
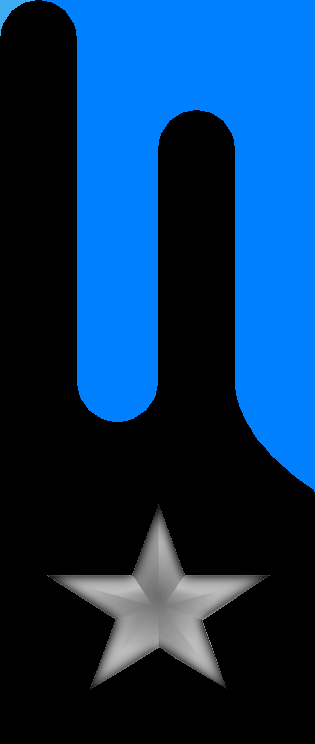
- Unit gorget patches

The Logistic Regiment "Garibaldi" (Italian: Reggimento Logistico "Garibaldi") is a military logistics regiment of the Italian Army based in Persano in Campania. The regiment is the most decorated logistic unit of the Italian Army and assigned to the Bersaglieri Brigade "Garibaldi". The regiment's anniversary falls, as for all units of the Italian Army's Transport and Materiel Corps, on 22 May, the anniversary of the Royal Italian Army's first major use of automobiles to transport reinforcements to the Asiago plateau to counter the Austro-Hungarian Asiago Offensive in May 1916.

== History ==
=== Cold War ===
In 1963, the Italian Army reorganized its armored divisions along NATO standards and added a brigade level to the divisions' organization. As part of the reorganization the Armored Division "Ariete" formed a services battalion for each of its three brigades. On 1 June 1963, the command of the I Services Battalion "Ariete" was formed in Pordenone and assigned to the I Mechanized Brigade "Ariete".

Initially the battalion consisted of a command, a command platoon, an auto unit, a mobile workshop, a mixed services platoon, and provisions team. On 1 January 1966, the battalion was reorganized and consisted afterwards of a command, a command and services company, an auto unit, a medical company, and a Resupply, Repairs, Recovery Unit. On 30 September 1968, the division's three brigade headquarters were disbanded and the next day, on 1 October 1968, the I Services Battalion "Ariete" was assigned to the division's Services Grouping Command "Ariete".

As part of the 1975 army reform the Armored Division "Ariete" was reorganized and three new brigades were formed with the division's units: on 1 October 1975, the 32nd Armored Brigade "Mameli" and on 1 November 1975, the 8th Mechanized Brigade "Garibaldi" and 132nd Armored Brigade "Manin". On 1 November 1975, the I Services Battalion "Ariete" was renamed Logistic Battalion "Garibaldi" and assigned to the 8th Mechanized Brigade "Garibaldi". Initially the battalion consisted of a command, a command platoon, and a supply and transport company, a medium workshop, and a vehicle park. At the time the battalion fielded 692 men (38 officers, 85 non-commissioned officers, and 569 soldiers).

On 12 November 1976, the President of the Italian Republic Giovanni Leone granted with decree 846 the battalion a flag.

For its conduct and work after the 1976 Friuli earthquake the battalion was awarded a Silver Medal of Army Valor, which was affixed to the battalion's flag and added to the battalion's coat of arms.

On 1 December 1981, the battalion was reorganized and consisted afterwards of the following units:

- Logistic Battalion "Garibaldi", in Pordenone
  - Command and Services Company
  - Supply Company
  - Maintenance Company
  - Medium Transport Company
  - Medical Unit (Reserve)

=== Recent times ===
After the end of the Cold War the Italian Army began a drawdown of its forces and relocated units from the country's Northeast to the country's South. On 30 April 1989, most of the personnel of the Logistic Battalion "Garibaldi" left Pordenone in the Friuli-Venezia Giulia region in the North of Italy and moved to Persano in the Campania region in the South of Italy. On the same date, the 5th Maneuver Logistic Battalion in Pordenone was disbanded. The next day, on 1 May 1989, the personnel of the "Garibaldi" battalion formed the Logistic Battalion "Persano" in Persano, while the personnel of the disbanded 5th Maneuver Logistic Battalion entered the Logistic Battalion "Garibaldi" in Pordenone. Afterwards the flag of the 5th Maneuver Logistic Battalion was transferred to the Shrine of the Flags in the Vittoriano in Rome for safekeeping.

The Logistic Battalion "Persano" was assigned to the 21st Military Zone and consisted of a command, a command and services unit, a supply company, a maintenance company, and a medium transport company. On 2 February 1990, the flag and traditions of the disbanded 5th Maneuver Logistic Battalion were assigned to the Logistic Battalion "Persano". On 4 April 1990, the flag of the 5th Maneuver Logistic Battalion arrived in Persano.

On 26 June 1991, the flag of the 5th Maneuver Logistic Battalion returned to the Shrine of the Flags in the Vittoriano. On 30 June 1991, the Logistic Battalion "Garibaldi" in Pordenone was disbanded and its personnel and materiel distributed to other logistic units in area, while the battalion's flag was transferred to Persano. The next day, on 1 July 1991, the 8th Bersaglieri Brigade "Garibaldi" became operational and the Logistic Battalion "Persano" was renamed Logistic Battalion "Garibaldi" and received its flag.

From 11 January 1996 to 2 July 1996, the battalion deployed as part of the NATO-led Implementation Force to Sarajevo in Bosnia and Herzegovina to support peacekeeping and reconstruction efforts after the Bosnian War. For its conduct and work in Bosnia and Herzegovina the battalion was awarded a Silver Cross of Army Merit, which was affixed to the battalion's flag.

From 25 March 1997 to 14 October 1997, the battalion deployed once more to Sarajevo as part of the NATO-led Stabilisation Force in Bosnia and Herzegovina. For its conduct and work in Sarajevo the battalion was awarded a Bronze Cross of Army Merit, which was affixed to the battalion's flag.

On 1 February 2001, the Logistic Battalion "Garibaldi" and the Medical Battalion "Garibaldi" merged and formed the 10th Maneuver Logistic Regiment, which, on the same date, was transferred from the Bersaglieri Brigade "Garibaldi" to the Logistic Projection Brigade. On 15 June 2001, the regiment was renamed 10th Maneuver Regiment and consisted of a command, a command and logistic support company, a supply battalion, a maintenance battalion, and a medical unit.

In May 2004, the regiment deployed to Iraq as part of the Italian contribution to the Multi-National Force – Iraq. On 5 and 6 August 2004, the Italian contingent fought a battle against the insurgent Mahdi Army for control of the three bridges in Nasiriyah. For its participation in that battle the regiment was awarded a Bronze Medal of Army Valor, which was affixed to the regiment's flag and added to the regiment's coat of arms.

From 22 October 2006 to 13 April 2007, the regiment deployed as part of the United Nations Interim Force in Lebanon to Chamaa in Lebanon to support peacekeeping and reconstruction efforts after the 2006 Lebanon War. For its conduct and work in Lebanon the regiment was awarded a Bronze Cross of Army Merit, which was affixed to the battalion's flag.

On 12 September 2013, the Logistic Projection Command was disbanded and the 10th Maneuver Regiment returned to the "Garibaldi" brigade. On 1 January 2015, the regiment was renamed Logistic Regiment "Garibaldi" and reorganized as a brigade logistic regiment. For its conduct and work during the COVID-19 pandemic the regiment was awarded in 2022 a Silver Cross of Army Merit, which was affixed to the regiment's flag.

== Organization ==
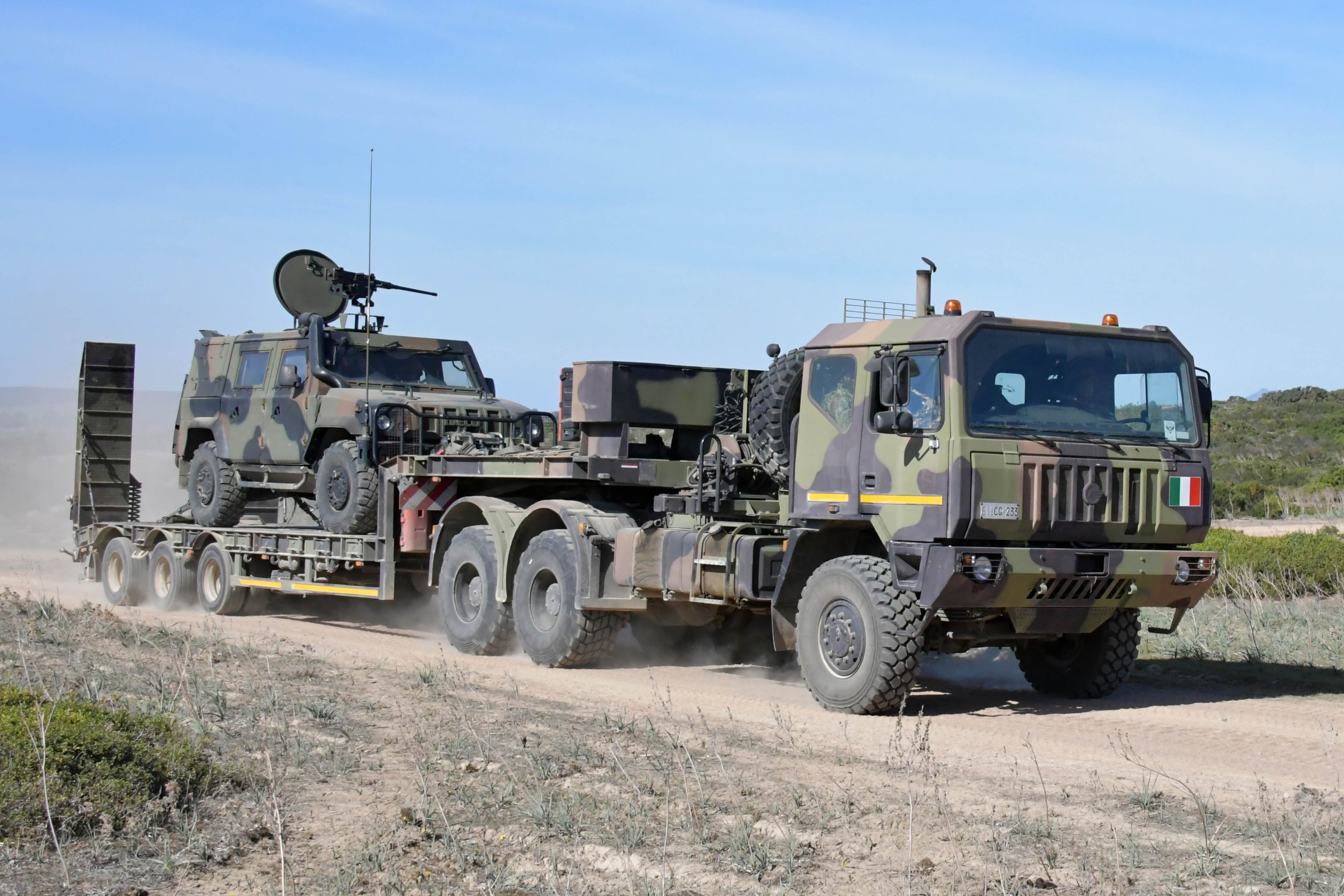
Logistic Regiment "Garibaldi" ACTL truck recovering a VTLM Lince during an exercise

As of 2024 the Logistic Regiment "Garibaldi" is organized as follows:

- Logistic Regiment "Garibaldi", in Persano
  - Command and Logistic Support Company
  - Logistic Battalion
    - Transport Company
    - Maintenance Company
    - Supply Company

== See also ==
- Military logistics
