= Bersaglieri Brigade "Garibaldi" =

- Brigata Bersaglieri "Garibaldi"
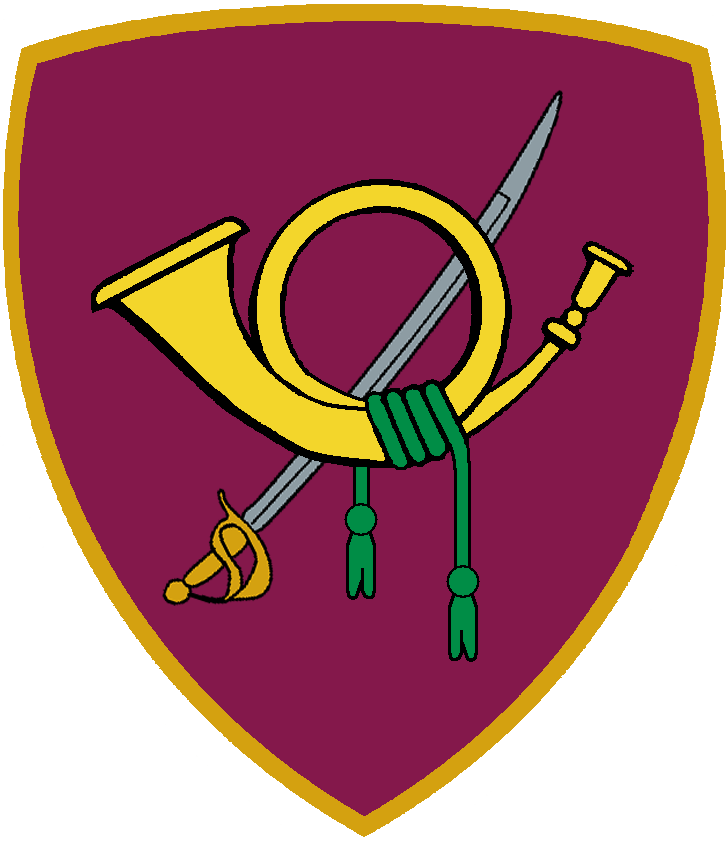
- Coat of Arms of the Bersaglieri Brigade "Garibaldi" since 1986
- Active: 1 November 1975 - 1 July 1991; 8th Mechanized Brigade "Garibaldi"; 1 July 1991 - 1 September 1994; 8th Bersaglieri Brigade "Garibaldi"; 1 September 1994 - today Bersaglieri Brigade "Garibaldi"
- Country: Italy
- Branch: Italian Army
- Role: Bersaglieri
- Size: Brigade
- Part of: Division "Acqui"
- Garrison/HQ: Caserta
- Nicknames: Garibaldi; Brigata Uànema
- Colors: dark red
- Engagements: Bosnia SFOR; Kosovo KFOR; Afghanistan ISAF; Iraq Multinational force in Iraq; Lebanon UNIFIL

Commanders
- Current commander: Brigadier Luigi Scollo

The Bersaglieri Brigade "Garibaldi" is a mechanized infantry brigade of the Italian Army, based in the south of the country. Its core units are Bersaglieri, an elite infantry corps of the Italian Army. The brigade is named after Giuseppe Garibaldi, a hero of the Italian wars of unification. The brigade is part of the Division "Acqui".

== History ==
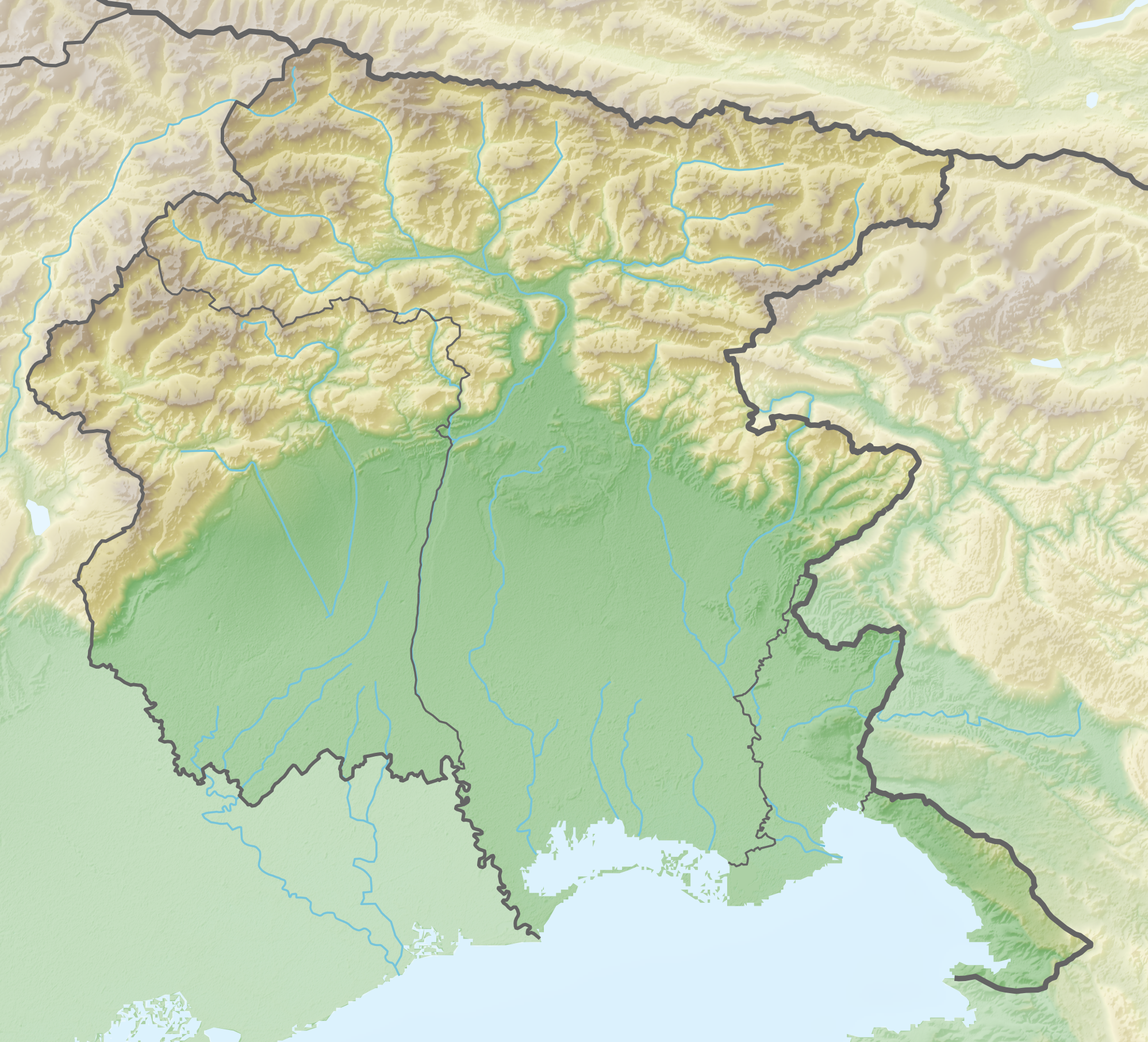
Garibaldi units in 1989

The brigade was activated during the 1975 army reform: in 1975 the regiment level was abolished and battalions came under direct command of newly formed multi-arms brigades. On 1 November 1975 the 8th Mechanized Brigade "Garibaldi" was activated one month after its sister brigades the 32nd Armored Brigade "Mameli" and the 132nd Armored Brigade "Manin" had been activated by reforming the three regiments of the 132nd Armored Division "Ariete".

The brigade's headquarters was in the city of Pordenone and most of its units came from the disbanded 8th Bersaglieri Regiment. Besides the traditions of the 8th Bersaglieri Regiment, the brigade also received the traditions and name of the 182nd Armored Infantry Regiment "Garibaldi". The name "Garibaldi" honored the Italian general and Italian unification hero Giuseppe Garibaldi and commemorated various Italian partisan units of World War II. The brigade's sister brigades, the "Manin" and "Mameli", were named to honor Daniele Manin and Goffredo Mameli, both also heroes of the Italian unification. The "Ariete" division was part of the 5th Army Corps based in North-Eastern Italy. The 5th Army Corps was tasked with defending the Yugoslav-Italian border against possible attacks by either the Warsaw Pact, or Yugoslavia or both. The Ariete was the corps' armored reserve. The Garibaldi's authorized strength was 4,733 men (272 officers, 637 non-commissioned officers and 3,824 soldiers) and it consisted of the following units:

- 8th Mechanized Brigade "Garibaldi", in Pordenone (former 8th Bersaglieri Regiment)
  - Command and Signal Unit "Garibaldi", in Pordenone
  - 7th Tank Battalion "M.O. Di Dio", in Vivaro (M60A1 main battle tanks)
  - 3rd Bersaglieri Battalion "Cernaia", in Pordenone (VCC-1 armored personnel carriers)
  - 11th Bersaglieri Battalion "Caprera", in Orcenico Superiore (VCC-1 armored personnel carriers; battalion was transferred on 1 July 1976 from the disbanded 182nd Armored Infantry Regiment "Garibaldi", of the Mechanized Division "Folgore")
  - 26th Bersaglieri Battalion "Castelfidardo" (VCC-1 armored personnel carriers), in Pordenone
  - 19th Self-propelled Field Artillery Group "Rialto", in Sequals (M109G 155 mm self-propelled howitzers; former II Self-propelled Field Artillery Group, 132nd Armored Artillery Regiment)
  - Logistic Battalion "Garibaldi", in Pordenone (former I Services Battalion, Services Grouping "Ariete")
  - Anti-tank Company "Garibaldi", in Vivaro (BGM-71 TOW anti-tank guided missiles)
  - Engineer Company "Garibaldi", in Orcenico Superiore

With the abolition of the divisional level in the Italian Army on 1 October 1986 the "Garibaldi" came under direct command of the 5th Army Corps and received a new coat of arms.

=== Recent history ===
With the end of the Cold War and the following massive reorganization of the Italian Army the brigade was transferred to the South of Italy to the city of Caserta, where it became operational on 1 July 1991. Along with the move the brigade changed its name to 8th Bersaglieri Brigade "Garibaldi" to reflect the changed composition of its subordinated units:

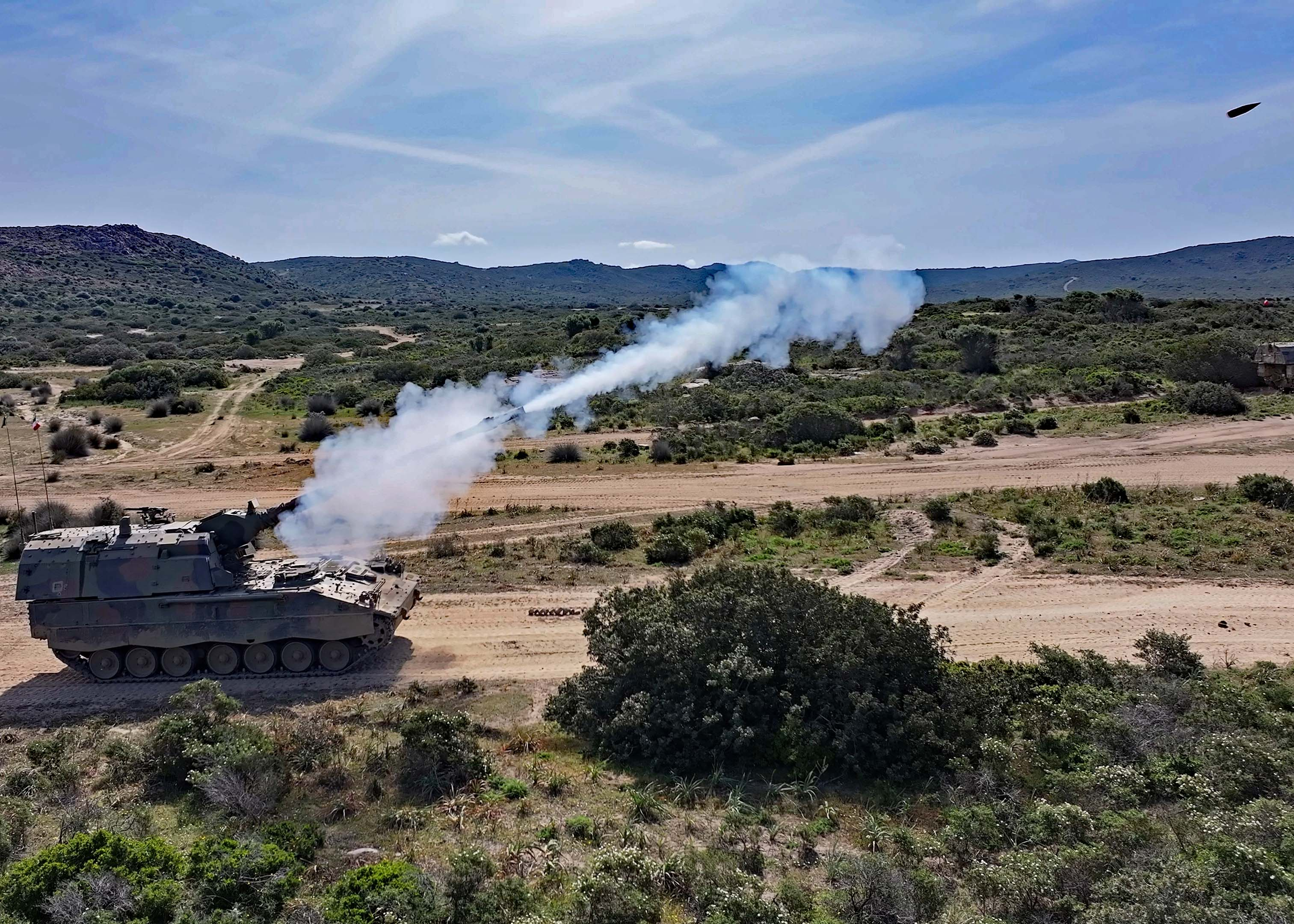
8th Field Artillery Regiment "Pasubio" PzH 2000 howitzer during exercise "Alfiere d’Acciaio" 2025, 24 April 2025.

- 8th Bersaglieri Brigade "Garibaldi", in Caserta
  - Command and Signal Unit "Garibaldi", in Caserta
  - 31st Tank Battalion "M.O. Andreani", in Persano
  - 19th Squadrons Group "Cavalleggeri Guide", in Salerno
  - 3rd Bersaglieri Battalion "Cernaia", in Caserta
  - 67th Bersaglieri Battalion "Fagarè", in Persano
  - 91st Infantry Battalion "Lucania" (Recruits Training), in Potenza
  - 11th Field Artillery Group "Teramo", in Persano
  - Logistic Battalion "Garibaldi", in Caserta
  - Medical Battalion "Garibaldi", in Caserta

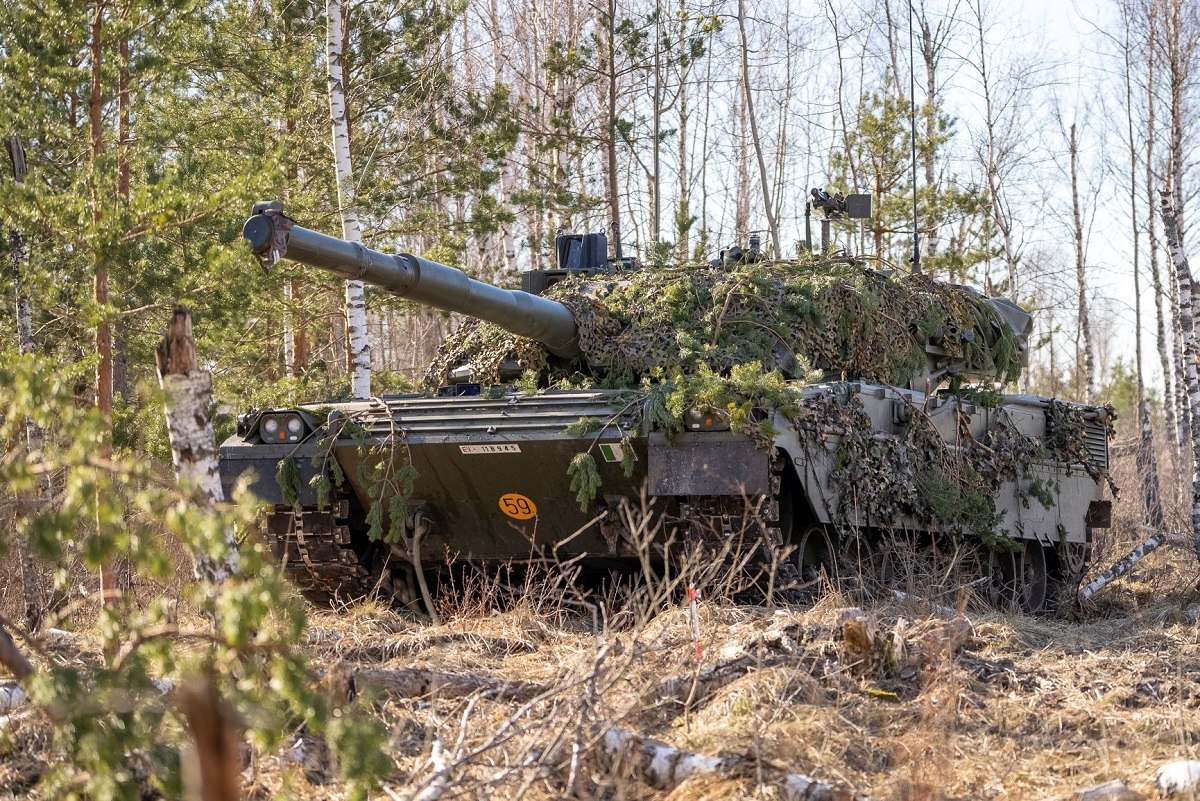
4th Tank Regiment Ariete main battle tank

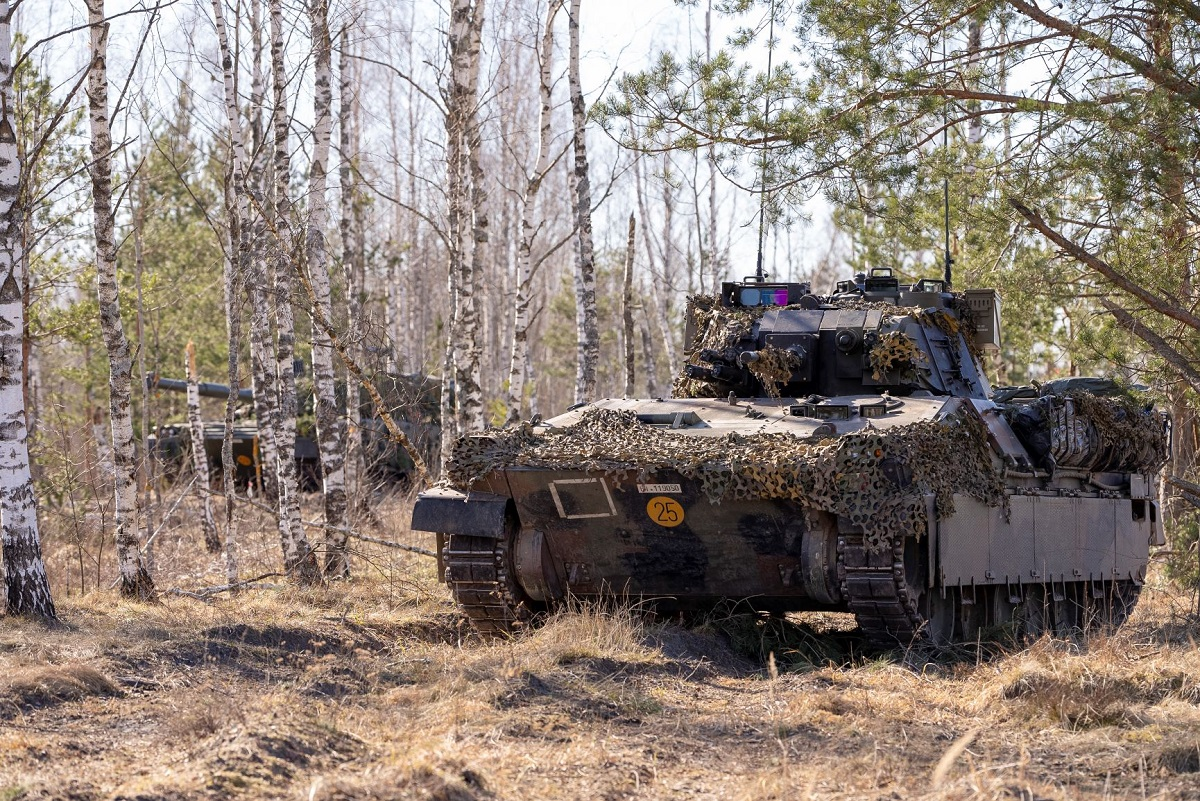
1st Bersaglieri Regiment Dardo IFV

Following the move the brigade became the first Italian brigade to fully professionalize. From 1992 onwards all soldiers of the brigade were professional soldiers or long term volunteers. During the later 1990s the brigades composition changed slightly as a result of the massive reduction of forces after the Cold War and the army's desire to preserve the names of the most decorated units of the Army. Therefore, units changed names, although garrison and composition of the units did not change. The brigade itself shed the number from its name 1 in September 1994. The changes to the brigades units over the coming years follow below:

- 5 August 1991: 19th Squadrons Group "Cavalleggeri Guide" becomes: Regiment "Cavalleggeri Guide" (19th)
- 10 September 1992: 11th Self-propelled Field Artillery Group "Teramo" becomes: 11th Self-propelled Field Artillery Regiment "Teramo"
- 26 June 1993: 3rd Bersaglieri Battalion "Cernaia" becomes: 8th Bersaglieri Regiment
- 1 September 1993: 31st Armored Battalion "M.O. Andreani" becomes: 131st Tank Regiment
- 10 September 1993: 67th Bersaglieri Battalion "Fagarè" becomes: 18th Bersaglieri Regiment and moves from Perano to Cosenza
- 1 September 1994: 8th Bersaglieri Brigade "Garibaldi" is renamed Bersaglieri Brigade "Garibaldi"
- 1 October 1997: 91st Battalion "Lucania" is transferred to the Southern Military Region
- 1 December 2000: 21st Engineer Regiment in Caserta joins the brigade
- 1 February 2001: Logistic Battalion "Garibaldi" and Medical Battalion "Garibaldi" merge as: 10th Logistic Maneuver Regiment, which is transferred to the army's Logistic Brigade
- 1 October 2001: 11th Self-propelled Field Artillery Regiment "Teramo" becomes: 8th Self-propelled Artillery Regiment "Pasubio"
- 1 January 2005: 18th Bersaglieri Regiment becomes: 1st Bersaglieri Regiment
- 11 July 2013: 4th Tank Regiment in Bellinzago Novarese disbands and its name and war flag are assigned to the 131st Tank Regiment

== Organization ==
"Garibaldi" units 2022
(the 1st Bersaglieri Regiment is based in Cosenza to the South)

Today the Bersaglieri Brigade "Garibaldi" is one of two Italian Army brigades equipped with tracked vehicles. It has been employed, in Karbala Iraq during the Iraq War and in Herat in Afghanistan as part of the International Security Assistance Force. As of 4 October 2022 the brigade is organized as follows:

- Bersaglieri Brigade "Garibaldi", in Caserta
  - 4th Bersaglieri Command and Tactical Supports Unit, in Caserta
  - Regiment "Cavalleggeri Guide" (19th), in Salerno (Centauro tank destroyers)
  - 4th Tank Regiment, in Persano (Ariete main battle tanks)
  - 1st Bersaglieri Regiment, in Cosenza (Dardo infantry fighting vehicles)
  - 8th Bersaglieri Regiment, in Caserta (Dardo, infantry fighting vehicles)
  - 8th Field Artillery Regiment "Pasubio", in Persano (PzH 2000 self-propelled howitzers)
  - 21st Engineer Regiment, in Caserta
  - Logistic Regiment "Garibaldi", in Persano

All regiments are battalion sized.

== Equipment ==
The tank regiment is equipped with Ariete main battle tanks, the cavalry regiment with Centauro tank destroyers and VTLM Lince vehicles. The Bersaglieri regiments field Dardo infantry fighting vehicles. The artillery regiment is equipped with PzH 2000 self-propelled howitzers.

== Gorget patches ==
The personnel of the brigade's units wears the following gorget patches:

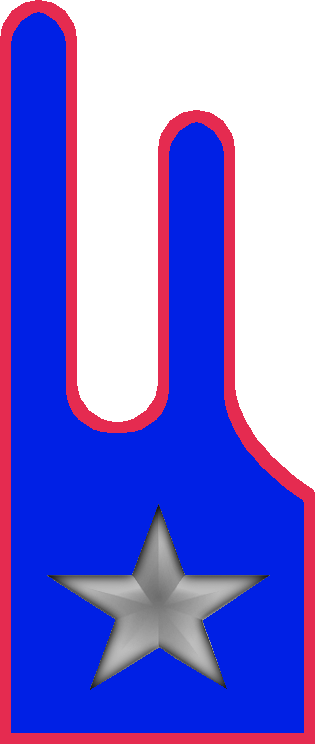
4th Bersaglieri Command and Tactical Supports Unit

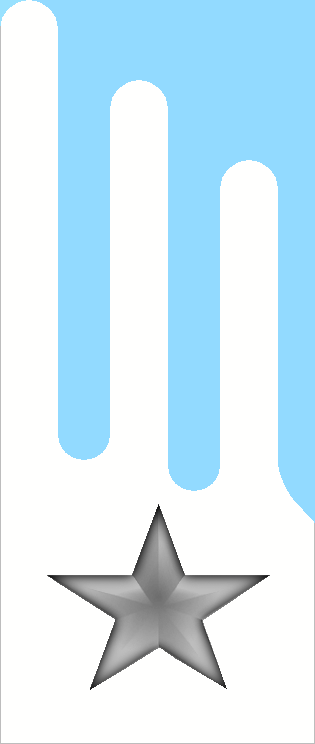
Regiment "Cavalleggeri Guide" (19th)

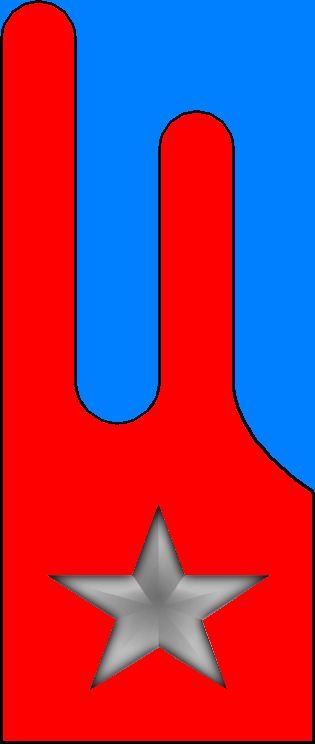
4th Tank Regiment

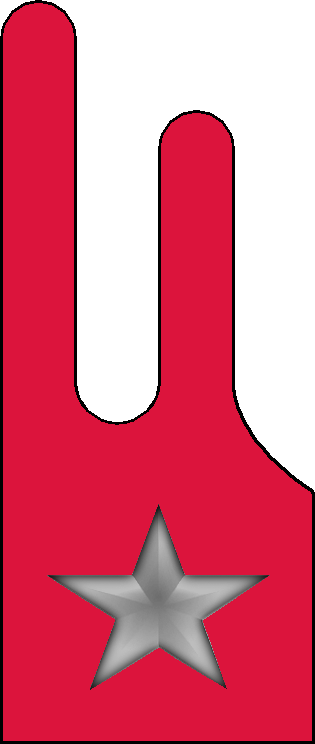
1st Bersaglieri Regiment

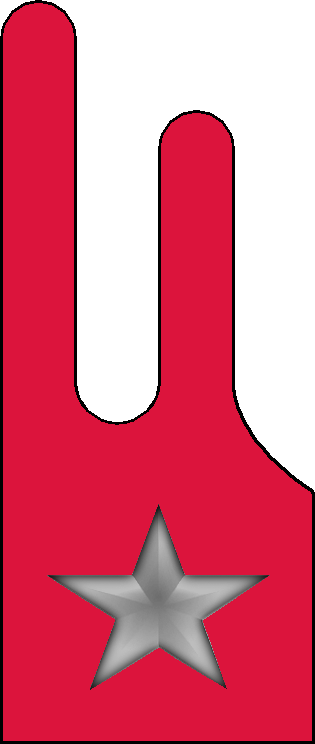
8th Bersaglieri Regiment

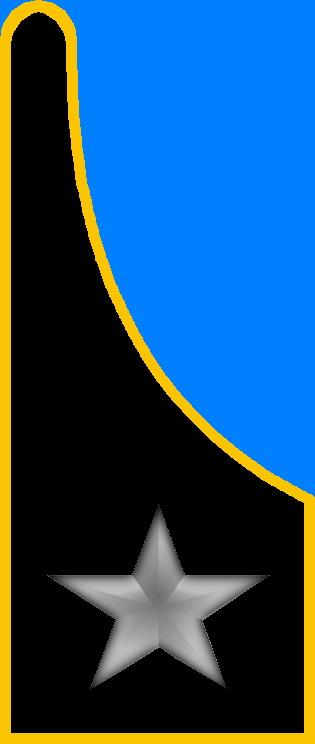
8th Field Artillery Regiment "Pasubio"

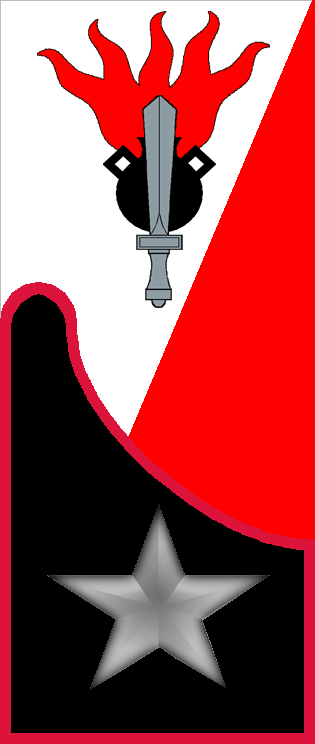
21st Engineer Regiment

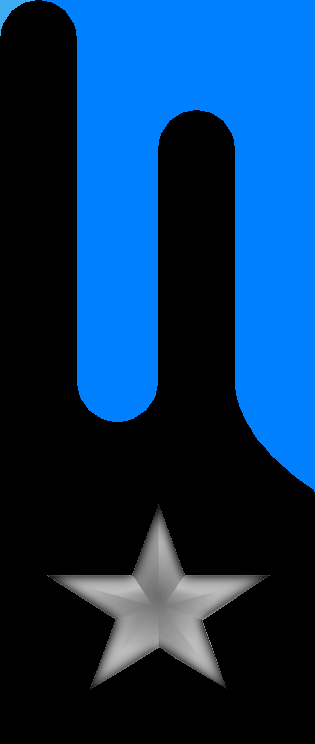
Logistic Regiment "Garibaldi"
