= 8th Heavy Field Artillery Regiment (Italy) =

Inactive Italian Army artillery unit

- 8° Reggimento Artiglieria Pesante Campale
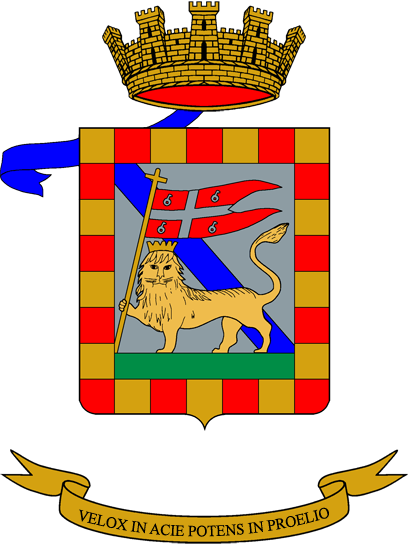
- Regimental coat of arms
- Active: 1 Aug. 1920 — 12 Sept. 1943; 11 Feb. 1951 — 13 Oct. 1995
- Country: Italy
- Branch: Italian Army
- Part of: 3rd Army Corps
- Garrison/HQ: Modena
- Motto: "Velox in acie potens in proelio"
- Anniversaries: 15 June 1918 - Second Battle of the Piave River
- Decorations: 1x Bronze Medal of Military Valor

Insignia
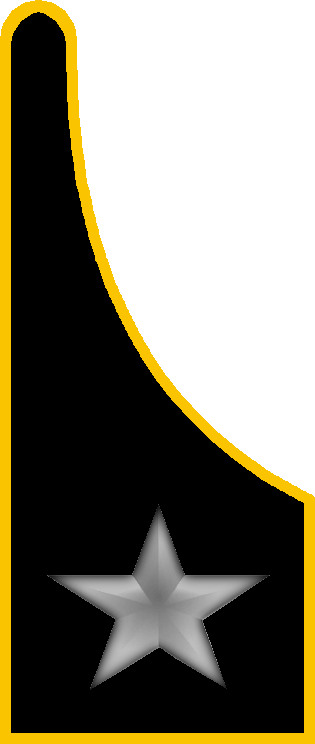
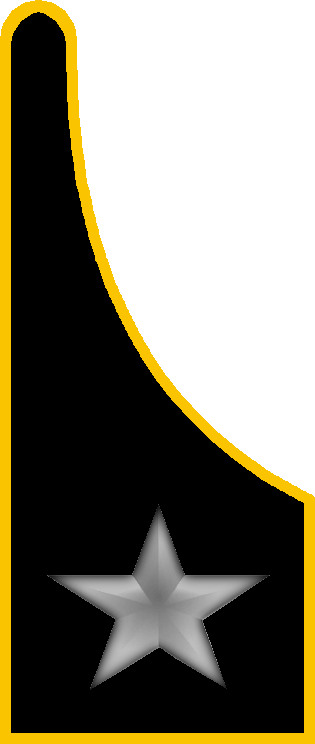
- Regimental gorget patches

The 8th Heavy Field Artillery Regiment (Italian: 8° Reggimento Artiglieria Pesante Campale) is an inactive artillery regiment of the Italian Army, which was based in Modena in the Emilia-Romagna and assigned to the 3rd Army Corps. Originally an artillery regiment of the Royal Italian Army, the regiment was formed in 1920 with pre-existing groups, which had fought during World War I on the Italian front. During World War II the regiment formed two army corps artillery groupings, one of which participated in 1940 in the Italian invasion of France and fought in 1941 in the Greco-Italian War. After the end of operations in Greece the grouping returned to Italy, where it was tasked with coastal defense duties until November 1942, when the grouping returned to occupied Greece on occupation and coastal defense duties in the area of Corinth. The other grouping was transferred to Libya and participated in September 1940 in the Italian Italian invasion of Egypt. The grouping was destroyed during the British Operation Compass, when British forces captured Tobruk. The regiment and the grouping in Corinth were disbanded by invading German forces after the announcement of the Armistice of Cassibile on 8 September 1943.

In 1951, the Italian Army reformed the regiment as 8th Heavy Field Artillery Regiment and the following year it was assigned to the VI Army Corps. In 1972, the regiment was transferred to the Tuscan-Emilian Military Region. In 1986, the regiment was reduced to 8th Artillery Unit, which consisted of a Command and Services Battery, the 8th Heavy Field Artillery Group "Marmore", and a reserve group. In 1991, the reserve group was disbanded and the unit was renamed 8th Heavy Field Artillery Regiment. In 1992, the regiment was reorganized as 8th Anti-aircraft Artillery Regiment and two years later, in 1994, the regiment was transferred to the 3rd Army Corps. In 1995, the regiment was disbanded and its flag transferred to the Shrine of the Flags in the Vittoriano in Rome for safekeeping.

The regiment's anniversary falls, as for all Italian Army artillery regiments, on June 15, the beginning of the Second Battle of the Piave River in 1918. This article is about the Royal Italian Army's 8th Heavy Field Artillery Regiment, which was a support unit assigned to a corps-level command. This regiment is unrelated to the 8th Heavy Artillery Regiment, which was a support unit assigned to an army-level command, and unrelated to the 8th Field Artillery Regiment, which was a support unit assigned to a division-level command.

== History ==
=== Interwar years ===
On 1 August 1920, the 7th Heavy Field Artillery Regiment was formed in Terni. The new regiment's command was formed with the personnel of the disbanded 37th Heavy Field Artillery Regiment, which had been formed one month earlier with four artillery groups, that had fought on the Italian front during World War I. The four groups were the former II Group of the 33rd Field Artillery Regiment, the VIII and XXII groups, which had been formed during the war by the depot of the 2nd Heavy Field Artillery Regiment, and the XXXII Group, which had been formed during the war by the depot of the 23rd Field Artillery Regiment. Upon entering the new regiment, the II and XXII were used to form the I and II cannons groups with 105/28 cannons, while the VIII and XXXII groups were used to form the III and IV howitzers groups with 149/12 howitzers.

On 31 October 1926, the 7th Heavy Field Artillery Regiment moved from Terni to Rome and the next day, on 1 November 1926, the regiment was renumbered as 8th Heavy Field Artillery Regiment. On 30 November of the same year, the regiment incorporated the V Mixed Group, which was arrived from the disbanded 11th Heavy Field Artillery Regiment. The V Mixed Group was based in Civitavecchia and fielded one battery with 105/28 cannons and one battery with 149/12 howitzers. On 31 December 1929, the V Mixed Group was transferred to the 16th Field Artillery Regiment.

In July 1934, the regiment's III Group was assigned to the Central Artillery School and, on 1 October of the same year, the regiment was renamed 8th Army Corps Artillery Regiment. In 1935, the regiment mobilized the 310th Refrigerators Tractor Auto Unit and the III Bombards Group with 81 mm mod. 35 mortars for the Second Italo-Ethiopian War. As the artillery regiment based in Italy's capital the 8th Army Corps Artillery Regiment became on 12 January 1936 the custodian of the flag of the Artillery Arm, which until then had been in the custody of the 13th Artillery Regiment "Granatieri di Sardegna". From 10 to 19 February 1936, the III Bombards Group fought in the Battle of Amba Aradam and, on 31 March 1936, the group fought on Mekan Pass in the Battle of Maychew. During these battles the group's 8th Battery distinguished itself and was awarded a Bronze Medal of Military Valor, which was affixed to the 8th Army Corps Artillery Regiment's flag.

=== World War II ===
At the outbreak of World War II the regiment consisted of a command and four groups. During the war the regiment's depot in Rome mobilized the following unit commands:

- 8th Army Corps Artillery Grouping
- 22nd Army Corps Artillery Grouping
- I Cannons Group with 100/17 mod. 14 howitzers
- XIII Cannons Group with 105/28 cannons
- XIV Cannons Group with 105/28 cannons
- XLIV Cannons Group with 105/28 cannons
- CXIII Howitzers Group with 149/13 heavy howitzers
- CXIV Howitzers Group with 149/13 heavy howitzers
- CLXI Howitzers Group with 149/19 heavy howitzers
- CLXII Howitzers Group with 149/19 heavy howitzers
- CLXIII Howitzers Group with 149/19 heavy howitzers
- CLXVI Howitzers Group with 149/19 heavy howitzers
- 8th Army Corps Specialists Unit

The regiment's depot also formed and mobilized the batteries for the group commands. The groups operated either under the command of an army corps artillery grouping or as autonomous units. In the evening of 8 September 1943, the Armistice of Cassibile, which ended hostilities between the Kingdom of Italy and the Anglo-American Allies, was announced by General Dwight D. Eisenhower on Radio Algiers and by Marshal Pietro Badoglio on Italian radio. Germany reacted by invading Italy and the 8th Army Corps Artillery Regiment and its depot were disbanded soon thereafter by German forces.

- 8th Army Corps Artillery Grouping: the grouping was mobilized at the outbreak of World War II and, on 10 June 1940, the day Italy entered the war, the grouping consisted of a command, a command unit, the XIII Cannons Group with 105/28 cannons, the CXIII and CXIV howitzers groups with 149/13 heavy howitzers, and the 8th Army Corps Specialists Unit. In this configuration the grouping participated in June 1940 in the Italian invasion of France. In fall 1941, the grouping and XIV Cannons Group with 105/28 cannons were sent to Albania as reinforcements for the Italian units fighting in the Greco-Italian War. After the end of operations in Greece the grouping returned to Italy, where it was tasked with coastal defense duties until November 1942, when the grouping returned to occupied Greece on occupation and coastal defense duties in the area of Corinth. The grouping was disbanded by German forces after the announcement of the Armistice of Cassibile on 8 September 1943.
- 22nd Army Corps Artillery Grouping: the grouping was formed on 23 May 1940 in Rome and consisted of a command, a command unit, and the I Cannons Group with 100/17 mod. 14 howitzers. At the end of the month the grouping was shipped to Libya, where it disembarked in Derna on 1 June 1940. In Libya the grouping was reinforced with the XLII Cannons Group with 105/28 cannons, which had been mobilized by 6th Army Corps Artillery Regiment, and the XLIII Cannons Group with 105/28 cannons, which had been mobilized by 3rd Army Corps Artillery Regiment. In July 1940, the grouping deployed to Tobruk and, in September 1940, it participated in the Italian invasion of Egypt. The grouping was destroyed during the British Operation Compass, when British forces captured Tobruk.

=== Cold War ===
On 11 February 1951, the Italian Army reformed the regiment as the 8th Heavy Field Artillery Regiment in Viterbo. The regiment was assigned to the Artillery Command of the VIII Territorial Military Command and consisted of a command, a command unit, the I Group with 149/19 heavy howitzers, the II Group with British 140/30 guns, and a depot. In April 1953, the regiment received a Light Aircraft Section with L-21B artillery observation planes. In 1955, the regiment moved from Viterbo to Modena and was transferred from the VIII Territorial Military Command to the VII Territorial Military Command. Around this time the regiment formed the III Group with 140/30 guns.

Inn 1959, the I Group replaced its 149/19 heavy howitzers with American M59 155 mm field guns and in autumn 1960 the II and III groups were equipped with American M114 155 mm howitzers. On 31 January 1963, the Light Aircraft Section was disbanded. In 1973, the regiment's III Group was placed in reserve status. On 15 September 1974, the regiment received the I and II groups with M114 155mm howitzers in Piacenza from the disbanded 6th Heavy Field Artillery Regiment, which were incorporated into the regiment as IV Group and V Group, with the latter being a reserve formation. On 1 October 1975, the regiment renumbered its groups and afterwards consisted of the following units:

- 8th Heavy Field Artillery Regiment, in Modena
  - Command and Services Battery, in Modena
  - 1st Group with M114 155 mm howitzers, in Piacenza
  - 2nd Group with M114 155mm howitzers, in Modena
  - 3rd Group with M114 155mm howitzers, in Modena (Reserve)
  - 4th Group with M59 155 mm field guns, in Modena
  - 5th Group with M59 155mm field guns, in Piacenza (Reserve)

On 11 August 1981, the two groups in Piacenza were disbanded and the remaining three groups were renumbered as 1st, 2nd, and 3rd groups. The 3rd Group remained a reserve formation and was equipped with M101 105 mm howitzers.

On 31 May 1986, the 2nd Group was disbanded and the next day, on 1 June 1986, the regiment was renamed 8th Artillery Unit. On the same date the regiment's 1st Group was renamed 8th Heavy Field Artillery Group "Marmore" and assigned the regiment's flag and traditions. The reasons to name the group after the Marmore man-made waterfalls in Terni, which were created by the Romans in 271BC, are unknown. The unit was assigned to the Artillery Command of the Tuscan-Emilian Military Region and had an experimental organization:

- 8th Artillery Unit, in Modena
  - Command and Services Battery
  - 8th Heavy Field Artillery Group "Marmore"
    - 3 × batteries with M114 155 mm howitzers
  - 3rd Group (mobilization unit)
    - 3 × batteries with M101 105 mm howitzers

=== Recent times ===
On 22 June 1991, the 8th Heavy Field Artillery Regiment was reformed and on the same day, the flag and traditions of the regiment were transferred from the 8th Heavy Field Artillery Group "Marmore" back to the 8th Heavy Field Artillery Regiment. The reformed regiment consisted of a command, a command and services battery, and the 8th Heavy Field Artillery Group "Marmore".

On 20 August 1992, the regiment began the process of replacing its M114 155mm howitzers with 40 mm L/70 autocannons and, on 31 December of the same year, the regiment was renamed 8th Anti-aircraft Artillery Regiment. On 1 January 1994, the regiment was transferred from the Tuscan-Emilian Military Region's Artillery Command to the 3rd Army Corps' Artillery Command.

On 13 October 1995, the 8th Anti-aircraft Artillery Regiment was disbanded and, on 16 November of the same year, the regiment's flag was transferred to the Shrine of the Flags in the Vittoriano in Rome for safekeeping.
