= 6th Heavy Field Artillery Regiment (Italy) =

Inactive Italian Army artillery unit

- 6° Reggimento Artiglieria Pesante Campale
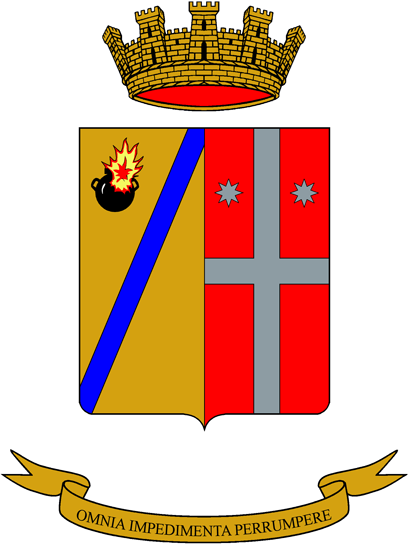
- Regimental coat of arms
- Active: 1 April 1912 — 8 Sept. 1943; 15 Feb. 1951 — 15 Sept. 1974; 1 Nov. 1986 — 30 June 1991
- Country: Italy
- Branch: Italian Army
- Part of: 5th Army Corps
- Garrison/HQ: Treviso
- Motto: "Omnia impedimenta perrumpere"
- Anniversaries: 15 June 1918 - Second Battle of the Piave River

Insignia
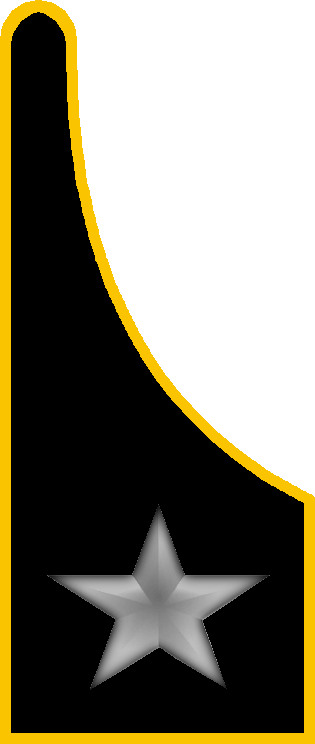
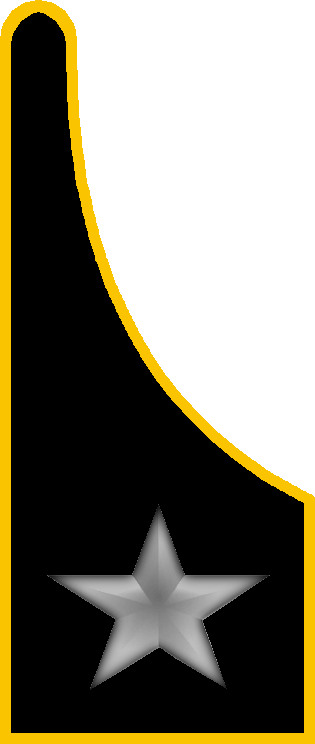
- Regimental gorget patches

The 6th Heavy Field Artillery Regiment (Italian: 6° Reggimento Artiglieria Pesante Campale) is an inactive artillery regiment of the Italian Army, which was last based in Treviso in Veneto and assigned to the 5th Army Corps. In 1912, the Royal Italian Army formed two heavy field artillery regiments, among them the 2nd Heavy Field Artillery Regiment in Modena. At the outbreak of World War I the regiment consisted of six groups with a combined 14 batteries. During the war the regiment acted as training unit and mobilized seven artillery grouping commands, 18 cannon group commands, one howitzers group command, and 59 batteries of various types for the aforementioned group commands. The regiment's groups served on the Italian front, and in 1917 two of the regiment's groups fought on the Montello hill during the Second Battle of the Piave River. In 1926, the regiment was renumbered as 6th Heavy Field Artillery Regiment. During World War II the regiment formed two army corps artillery grouping commands, one of which was transferred to the 11th Army Corps Artillery Regiment, while the other grouping participated in 1941 in the invasion of Yugoslavia. The grouping then remained in Yugoslavia on occupation duty. The regiment and its grouping were disbanded by invading German forces after the announcement of the Armistice of Cassibile on 8 September 1943.

In 1951, the Italian Army reformed the regiment in Piacenza. The regiment was assigned to the VII Territorial Military Command and equipped with British and Italian materiel. In 1974, the regiment was disbanded and its flag transferred to the Shrine of the Flags in the Vittoriano in Rome for safekeeping. In 1976, the 33rd Field Artillery Regiment was disbanded and two of the disbanded regiment's batteries were used to form the Artillery Specialists Group "Folgore", which was assigned to the Mechanized Division "Folgore". In 1986, the division was disbanded and the Artillery Specialists Group "Folgore" was renamed 6th Artillery Specialists Group "Montello" and transferred to the 5th Army Corps' Artillery Command. The group was assigned the flag and traditions of the 6th Heavy Field Artillery Regiment. In 1991, the group was disbanded and the flag of the 6th Heavy Field Artillery Regiment returned to the Shrine of the Flags in the Vittoriano in Rome.

The regimental anniversary falls, as for all Italian Army artillery regiments, on June 15 1918, the beginning of the Second Battle of the Piave River. This article is about the Royal Italian Army's 6th Heavy Field Artillery Regiment, which was a support unit assigned to a corps-level command. This regiment is unrelated to the 6th Heavy Artillery Regiment, which was a support unit assigned to an army-level command, and unrelated to the 6th Field Artillery Regiment, which was a support unit assigned to a division-level command.

== History ==
=== Formation ===
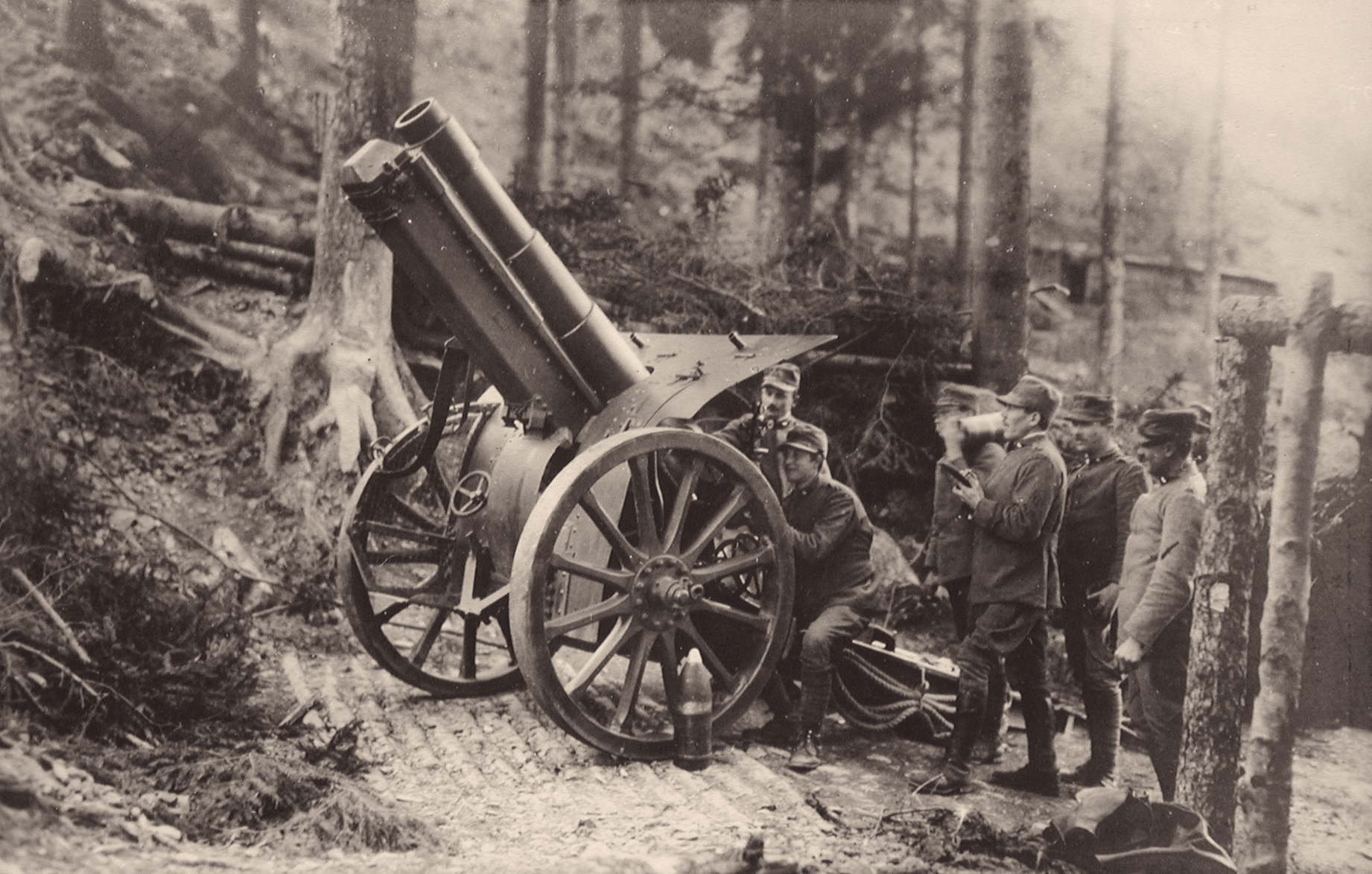
A 149/12 mod. 14 howitzer during the Third Battle of the Isonzo

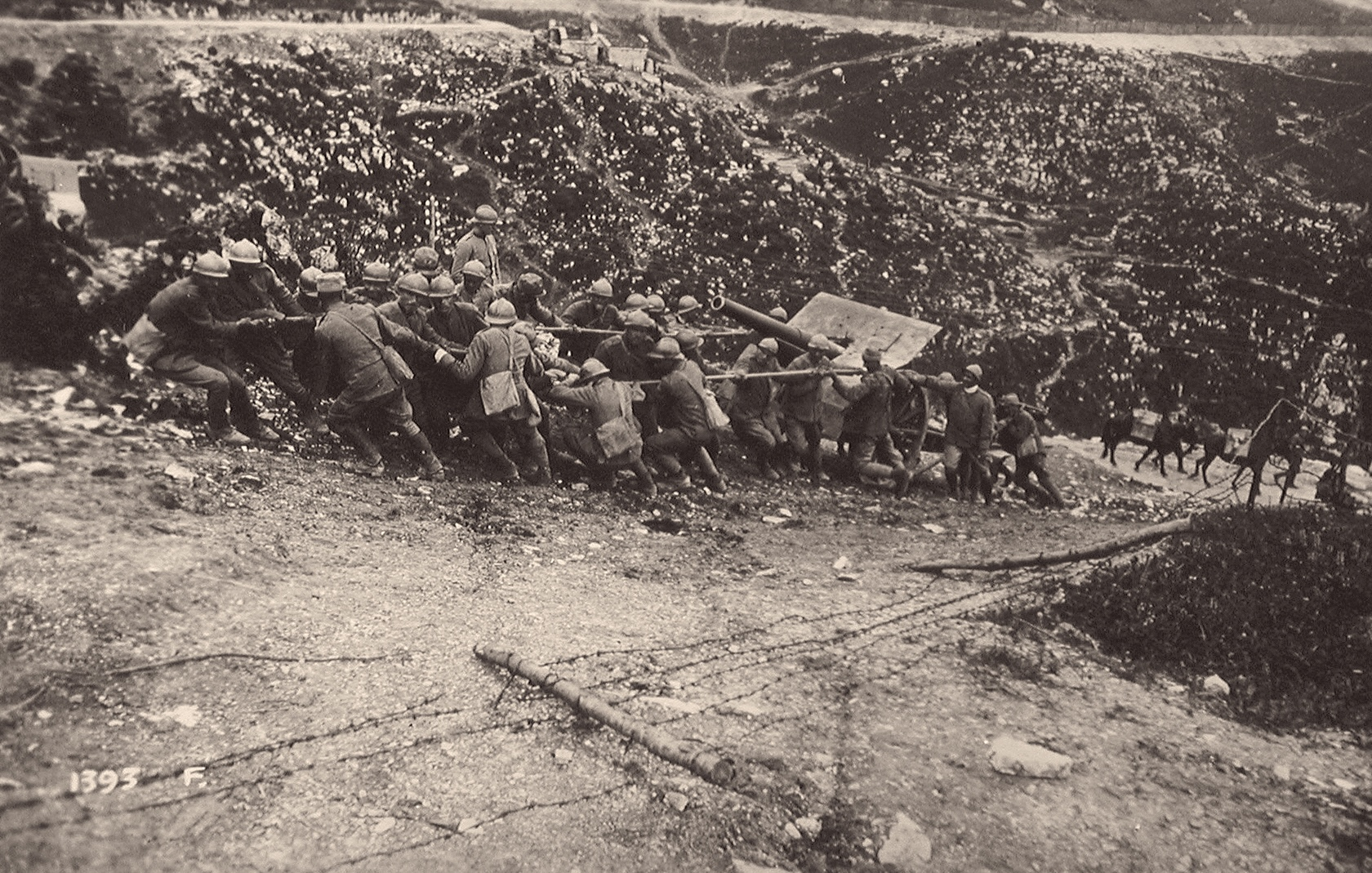
A 105/28 cannon is moved into position

In 1910, the Royal Italian Army decided to form a new artillery speciality, which would be equipped with heavier howitzers than the field artillery's 75/27 mod. 06 field guns and with more mobile howitzers than the fortress artillery's siege mortars and siege howitzers. In 1911, the army ordered 112 15 cm sFH 13 heavy field howitzers from the German arms manufacturer Krupp and acquired a license to produce the gun in Italy. In March 1912, Krupp delivered last of the 112 ordered howitzers and, on 1 April 1912, the Royal Italian Army formed two heavy field artillery regiments: the 1st Heavy Field Artillery Regiment in Casale Monferrato and the 2nd Heavy Field Artillery Regiment in Modena. Both regiments consisted of a command, a depot, the I Howitzers Group, and the II Howitzers Group. Each group fielded two batteries, with four 15 cm sFH 13 howitzers per battery. Upon entering Italian service the howitzers received the designation 149/12 heavy field howitzer.

The personnel for the 2nd Heavy Field Artillery Regiment's command, two groups, and depot was drawn from the 3rd Field Artillery Regiment and 15th Field Artillery Regiment, while the army's 149/12 howitzers training battery at San Maurizio Canavese was divided between the two regiments. On 1 November 1912, both regiments added the III Howitzers Group with three batteries and two years later, on 15 November 1914, both regiments added the IV Howitzers Group with three batteries. Between 5 and 20 January 1915, both regiments added the V and VI groups with two batteries per group. Afterwards each regiment fielded six groups with a combined 14 batteries and 56 howitzers.

=== World War I ===
On 24 May 1915, the day Italy entered World War I, the regiment's six groups were assigned to the following units:

- I Group (1st, 2nd, and 3rd Battery) — 3rd Army
- II Group (4th and 5th Battery) — VI Army Corps
- III Group (6th and 7th Battery) — 2nd Cavalry Division "Veneto", XI Army Corps
- IV Group (8th, 9th, and 10th Battery) — XII Army Corps
- V Group (11th and 12th Battery) — 4th Army
- VI Group (13th and 14th Battery) — 4th Army

During the war the 2nd Heavy Field Artillery Regiment acted as a training unit, while its groups fought as autonomous units on the Italian front. As the production of 149/12 mod. 14 howitzers turned out to be difficult and slow, the army decided to from cannon groups equipped with towed 105/28 cannons, respectively cannon groups equipped with 102/35 mod. 14 naval guns mounted on SPA 9000 trucks instead. In March 1916, the depots of field artillery regiments began with the formation of the first two howitzer groups equipped with 149/12 mod. 14 howitzers produced in Italy by Vickers-Terni and Ansaldo. However due to the complexity of the Krupp gun carriage and the need to replace more than 40 damaged gun carriages of units at the front, the 149/12 mod. 14 howitzers were delivered with a siege carriage, that lacked the desired mobility. In April 1916, the 2nd Heavy Field Artillery Regiment's six groups were renumbered as VII to XII group and the regiment's batteries were similarly renumbered as 15th to 28th battery. Consequently, the regiment's two new howitzer groups were numbered XIII and XIV, while the next two groups formed by the regiment in May 1916 were numbered XV and XVI. Afterwards the two heavy field artillery regiment's 16 howitzer groups fielded 40 batteries with a total of 160 149/12 howitzers. During the year 1916, the heavy field artillery's number of groups equipped with cannons grew to 20 cannon groups: 14 of which fielded 42 batteries with 105/28 cannons, while the remaining six groups fielded 16 batteries with 102/35 mod. 14 naval guns on SPA 9000 trucks.

By summer 1916, Ansaldo began production of a simpler gun carriage for the 149/12 howitzer. This new variant was designated 149/12 mod. 16. Consequently, the Italian War Ministry's Undersecretary for Arms and Ammunition ordered an additional 92 149/12 mod. 14 and 149/12 mod. 16 batteries, 84 of which would be assigned to 28 newly formed howitzer groups, while the remaining eight batteries would be used to bring the two heavy field artillery regiment's eight groups, which fielded just two batteries, to full strength. At the same time, the army decided to renumber the howitzer groups: groups equipped with German made 149/12 howitzers and 149/12 mod. 14 howitzers, would be numbered I to XXII, while the groups equipped with 149/12 mod. 16 would be numbered XXIII to XLIV. Likewise 149/12 and 149/12 mod. 14 batteries would be numbered 1st to 66th, while 149/12 mod. 16 batteries would be numbered 67th to 132nd. As the four groups formed in spring 1916 (XIII, XIV, XV, and XVI) were scheduled to replace the siege carriages of their 149/12 mod. 14 howitzers with the new Ansaldo gun carriage, they were renumbered as XXIII, XXIV, XXV, and XXVI groups.

Between November 1916 and February 1917, Vickers-Terni delivered enough 149/12 mod. 14 howitzers to form 18 batteries (37th to 54th), with which six new groups were formed (XIII to XVIII). In the same timeframe Ansaldo delivered enough 149/12 mod. 16 howitzers to form 24 batteries (79th to 102nd), with which eight new groups were formed (XXVII to XXXIV). Most of these howitzer groups were formed by the depots of field artillery regiments, while the two heavy field artillery regiments focused on forming cannon groups: the 2nd Heavy Field Artillery Regiment's depot formed only the command of the XXVIII Howitzer Group and four batteries with 149/12 mod. 16 howitzers. By the end of 1916, the number of cannon groups equipped with 105/28 cannons reached 22 groups with 66 batteries, while the number of groups with 102/35 mod. 14 naval guns on SPA 9000 trucks was capped at six. To command the heavy field artillery's groups at the front, the 2nd Heavy Field Artillery Regiment, together with the 1st Heavy Field Artillery Regiment and various field artillery regiments, formed the commands of 25 heavy field artillery groupings. Specifically, over the course of the war, the 2nd Heavy Field Artillery Regiment's depot in Modena formed the commands of the 2nd, 12th, 22nd, 23rd, 24th, and 25th heavy field artillery groupings, as well as the command of the 2nd Mixed Artillery Grouping. Of the various cannon groups, the regiment's depot formed the commands of the III, IV, VII, X, XII, XV, XVII, XX, XXII, XXIV, XXVI, XXVIII, XXXII, XXXIV, XXXIX, XL, XLI, and XLIII cannon groups, as well as 54 cannon batteries for these groups. The regiment's depot also formed the 500th Siege Battery for the army's heavy artillery.

In November 1917, after the Italian 2nd Army had been defeated in the Battle of Caporetto, the remnants of the 2nd Army, as well as the Italian 3rd Army retreated to the Piave river. In the battle and the following retreat the Italian artillery lost 3,152 artillery pieces — 44,6% of all available guns. The heavy field artillery lost entire groups to the advancing Austro-Hungarian and Imperial German armies. Over the course of the next months the heavy field artillery was rebuilt. In June 1918, the Austro-Hungarian forces attempted to cross the Piave river in the Second Battle of the Piave River. During the battle the 2nd Heavy Field Artillery Regiment's VII Group and IX Group fought on the Montello hill, while the regiment's X Group fought on Monte Grappa.

=== Interwar years ===
After the end of the war the Royal Italian Army began the process of downsizing its heavy field artillery. However, in November 1919, the army decided to assign a heavy field artillery regiment to each of its 14 army corps. Consequently, in summer 1920, the army formed an additional twelve heavy field artillery regiments, each of which consisted of two cannon groups and two howitzer groups. As part of this reorganization, the 2nd Heavy Field Artillery Regiment was assigned four groups, which had been formed by other regiments: the VIII Cannons Group, which had been formed by the depot of the 1st Heavy Field Artillery Regiment, the IX Cannons Group, which had been formed by the depot of the 3rd Field Artillery Regiment, the XLIV Howitzers Group, which had been formed by the depot of the 28th Field Artillery Regiment, and the XXVI Howitzers Group, which had been formed by the depot of the 11th Field Artillery Regiment. Upon entering the 2nd Heavy Field Artillery Regiment, the VIII and IX cannon groups were redesignated I and II cannon groups with 105/28 cannons, while the XLIV and XXVI groups were redesignated III and IV howitzers groups with 149/12 howitzers. The regiment was assigned to the VI Army Corps in Bologna, which during the same year was renumbered IV Army Corps.

In 1926, the IV Army Corps was renumbered VI Army Corps, while the II Army Corps in Alessandria was reformed. Consequently, on 1 November 1926, the VI Army Corps's 2nd Heavy Field Artillery Regiment in Modena and II Army Corps' 6th Heavy Field Artillery Regiment in Genova switched numbers to better align the two regiments with their respective army corps. On 1 October 1934, all heavy field artillery regiments were renamed army corps artillery regiment. Consequently, the 6th Heavy Field Artillery Regiment was renamed 6th Army Corps Artillery Regiment (Italian: 6° Reggimento Artiglieria di Corpo d'Armata). On 1 March 1935, the regiment ceded its II Group with 105/28 cannons to help form the 2nd Fast Artillery Regiment. On 2 May of the same year, the regiment's I Group was mobilized and sent to East Africa for the Second Italo-Ethiopian War. As replacement for the two groups the regiment's depot formed, on 25 July of the same year, the V Group with 105/28 cannons and the VI Group with 149/13 heavy howitzers. After the conclusion of the Second Italo-Ethiopian War the two groups were disbanded on 10 February 1936. In August 1937, the II Group with 105/28 cannons returned from the 2nd Fast Artillery Regiment.

=== World War II ===
At the outbreak of World War II the regiment consisted of a command and four groups. On 15 February 1940, the regiment, which at the time was deployed in the area of Pietra Ligure, was renamed 15th Army Corps Artillery Regiment and assigned to the XV Army Corps. On the same date the regiment's depot in Modena formed a new 6th Army Corps Artillery Regiment, which received the flag and traditions of the old 6th Army Corps Artillery Regiment. During the war the regiment's depot in Modena formed and mobilized the following commands and units:

- Command of the 6th Army Corps Artillery Grouping, which during operations represented the regiment
- Command of the 17th Army Corps Artillery Grouping
- XLII Cannons Group with 105/28 cannons
- LIV Cannons Group with 105/32 heavy field guns
- LV Cannons Group with 105/32 heavy field guns
- LVI Cannons Group with 105/32 heavy field guns
- LXII Cannons Group with 105/32 heavy field guns
- CXXVII Howitzers Group with 149/13 heavy howitzers
- CLXII Howitzers Group with 149/13 heavy howitzers
- 6th Army Corps Specialists Unit

The groups operated either under command of army corps artillery groupings or as autonomous units. In the evening of 8 September 1943, the Armistice of Cassibile, which ended hostilities between the Kingdom of Italy and the Anglo-American Allies, was announced by General Dwight D. Eisenhower on Radio Algiers and by Marshal Pietro Badoglio on Italian radio. Germany reacted by invading Italy and the 6th Army Corps Artillery Regiment and its depot were disbanded soon thereafter by German forces.

- 6th Army Corps Artillery Grouping: the grouping was mobilized on 6 December 1940 and consisted of a command, a command unit, the LIV, LV, and LVI cannons groups with 105/32 heavy field guns, the CXXVII Howitzers Group with 149/13 heavy howitzers, and the 6th Army Corps Specialists Unit. In this configuration the grouping participated in April 1941 in the invasion of Yugoslavia. Afterwards the grouping remained in occupied Yugoslavia on garrison duty. In December 1942, the grouping received the CXXXVI Group with 105/15 howitzers. In March 1943, the LV and LVI cannons groups left the grouping and were transferred to Sicily, where they reinforced the 202nd Coastal Division. In July and August 1943, the two groups fought against allied forces during the Allied invasion of Sicily and were heavily attrited. The survivors of the two groups were evacuated to Calabria in mainland Italy. The 6th Army Corps Artillery Grouping was in the area of Dubrovnik, when the Armistice of Cassibile was announced on 8 September 1943, and German forces disbanded the grouping shortly thereafter.
- 17th Army Corps Artillery Grouping: the grouping was formed on 10 September 1939 and sent to Cormons. On 10 February 1940, the grouping was transferred to the 11th Army Corps Artillery Regiment, which had been reformed on 10 November 1939.

=== Cold War ===
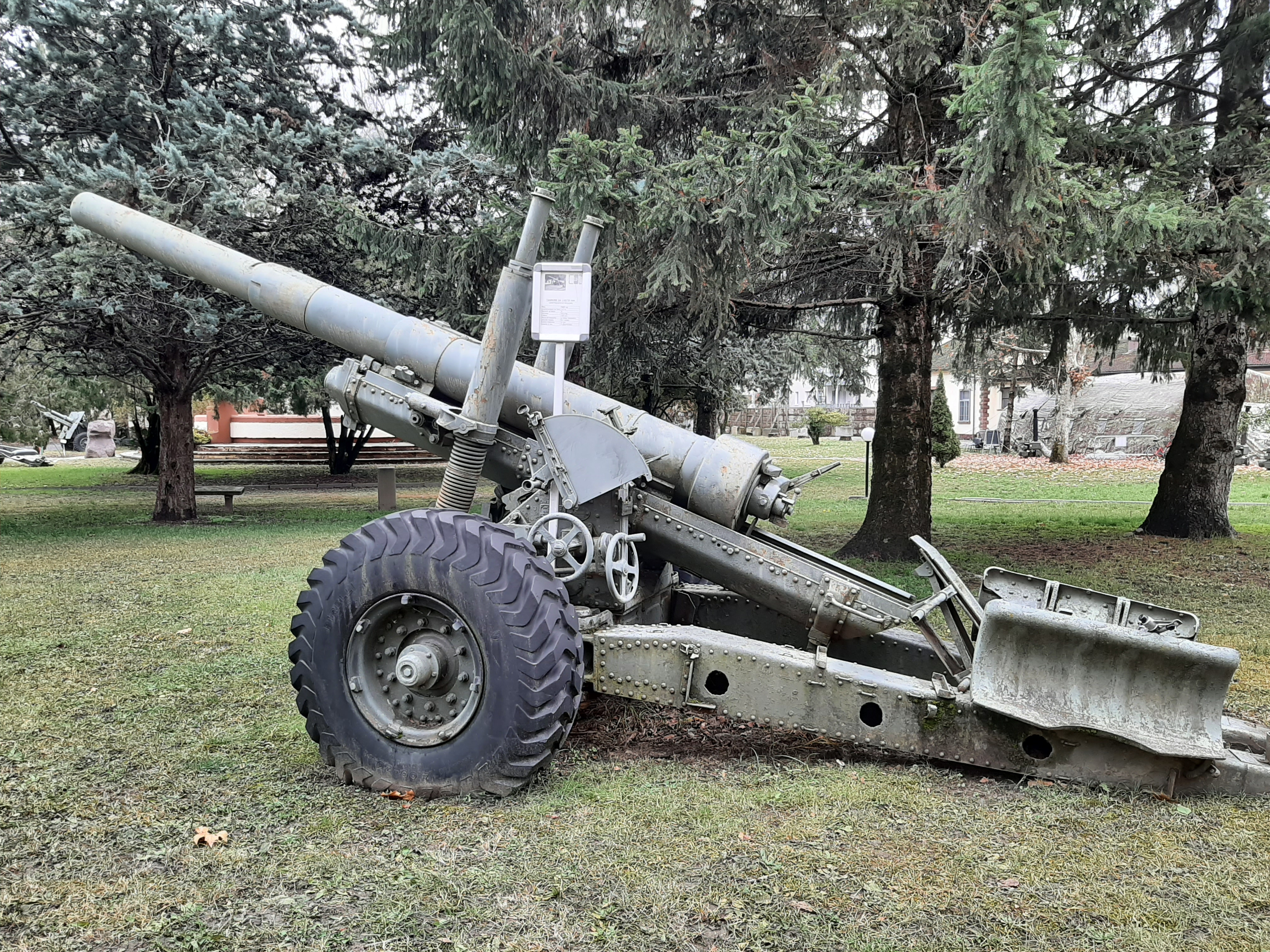
A British BL 5.5-inch medium gun used by the Italian Army after World War II

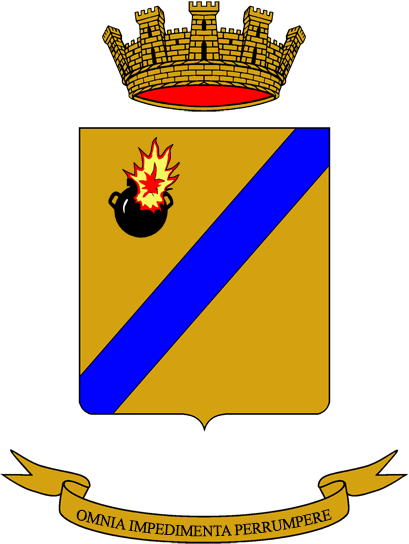
6th Heavy Field Artillery Regiment coat of arms 1951-74

On 15 February 1951, the Italian Army reformed the 6th Heavy Field Artillery Regiment in Piacenza. The regiment was assigned to the VII Territorial Military Command (Italian: VII Comando Militare Territoriale — VII C.M.T.) and consisted of a command, a command unit, the I Group with 149/19 heavy howitzers, and the II Group with British 140/30 guns. In 1953, the regiment formed the III Group with 149/19 heavy howitzers, which was disbanded on 1 April 1955. On 1 July 1957, the VII Territorial Military Command was renamed Tuscan-Emilian Military Region — VII C.M.T. On 31 December 1958, the II Group replaced its 140/30 guns with 149/19 heavy howitzers. On 23 March 1959, the regiment formed a new I Group with American M59 155mm field guns 155/45. By February 1961, the regiment's three groups were all equipped with American M114 155mm howitzers.

On 1 September 1973, the regiment's III Group was placed in reserve status. On 1 May 1974, the I Group was placed in reserve status and, on 15 September of the same year, the regiment was disbanded. Subsequently, the regiment's I and II groups were transferred to the 8th Heavy Field Artillery Regiment, while the III Group was transferred to the 41st Heavy Field Artillery Regiment. Subsequently, the flag of the 6th Heavy Field Artillery Regiment was transferred to the Shrine of the Flags in the Vittoriano in Rome for safekeeping

During the 1975 army reform the army disbanded the regimental level and newly independent battalions were granted for the first time their own flags, respectively in the case of cavalry units, their own standard. On 31 December 1975, the 33rd Field Artillery Regiment in Treviso was disbanded and the next day, on 1 January 1976, the disbanded regiment's Command and Services Battery and Specialists Battery were used to form the Artillery Specialists Group "Folgore". The new group was assigned to the Artillery Command of the Mechanized Division "Folgore" and consisted of a command, a command and services battery, and a specialists battery, which provided weather-ballistic data to the division's two heavy self-propelled field artillery groups and the artillery groups of the division's Mechanized Brigade "Gorizia", Mechanized Brigade "Trieste", and Armored Brigade "Vittorio Veneto". At the time the group fielded 290 men (15 officers, 36 non-commissioned officers, and 239 soldiers).

In 1986, the Italian Army abolished the divisional level and brigades, which until then had been under one of the Army's four divisions, came under direct command of the army's 3rd Army Corps or 5th Army Corps. Consequently, on 31 October 1986, the Mechanized Division "Folgore" was disbanded and the next day, on 1 November 1986, the Artillery Specialists Group "Folgore" was renamed 6th Artillery Specialists Group "Montello". The group was named for Montello hill, which had been a key Royal Italian Army artillery observation post during the First Battle of the Piave River in November 1917 and, which saw some of the fiercest fighting during the Second Battle of the Piave River in June 1918. On the same date the group joined the 5th Army Corps' Artillery Command and was assigned the flag and traditions of the 6th Heavy Field Artillery Regiment. On 13 July 1987, the President of the Italian Republic Francesco Cossiga issued a decree to confirm the assignment of the flag and traditions of the 6th Heavy Field Artillery Regiment to the group.

=== Recent times ===
On 31 March 1991, the 6th Artillery Specialists Group "Montello" was reduced to a reserve unit and the following 8 May the flag of the 6th Heavy Field Artillery Regiment was returned to the Shrine of the Flags in the Vittoriano in Rome for safekeeping. On 30 June of the same year, the group was officially disbanded.
