= Serre, Campania =

Serre
- Comune
- Comune di Serre
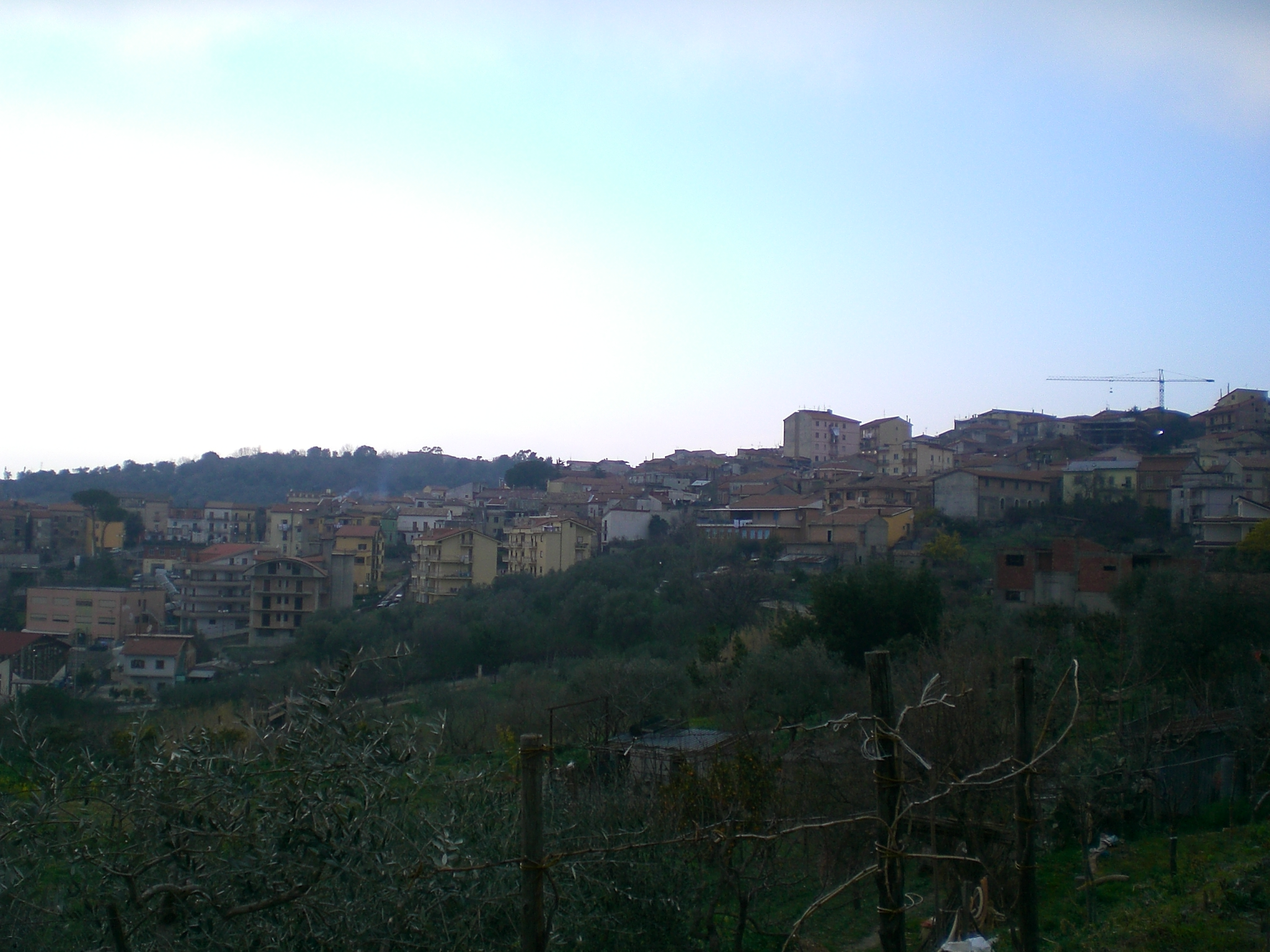

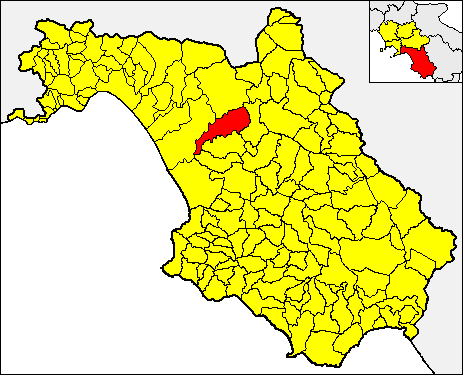
- Serre within the Province of Salerno

- Location within Italy Location within Campania
- Coordinates: 40°34′56.0″N 15°11′05.1″E
- Country: Italy
- Region: Campania
- Province: Salerno (SA)
- Frazioni: Borgo San Lazzaro, Persano

Government
  - Mayor: Franco Mennella

Area
  - Total: 67.03 km^{2} (25.88 sq mi)
- Elevation: 200 m (660 ft)

Population (28 February 2017)
  - Total: 3,955
  - Density: 59.00/km^{2} (152.8/sq mi)
- Demonym: Serresi
- Time zone: UTC+1 (CET)
  - Summer (DST): UTC+2 (CEST)
- Postal code: 84028
- Dialing code: 0828
- Patron saint: St. Martin
- Saint day: 11 November
- Website: Official website

Serre is a town and comune in the province of Salerno in the Campania region of south-western Italy.

== History ==
The town is medieval and was founded at the end of the 10th century.

== Geography ==
Serre is a hilltown located in northern Cilento. Its municipal territory, crossed by the rivers Sele and Calore Lucano, borders Albanella, Altavilla Silentina, Campagna, Eboli and Postiglione. The municipality includes the hamlets of Borgo San Lazzaro and Persano.

== See also ==
- Cilentan dialect
- Cilento National Park
