= Pelligra =

Pelligra is an Italian surname. Notable people with the surname include:

- Biagio Pelligra (born 1937), Italian actor
- Raffaele Pelligra (1888–1971), Italian general
- Raffaele Pelligra (diver) (born 2008), Italian diver
- Salvatore Pelligra (1891–1943), Italian general
