= Alfonso Cigala Fulgosi =

Italian general (1884–1943)

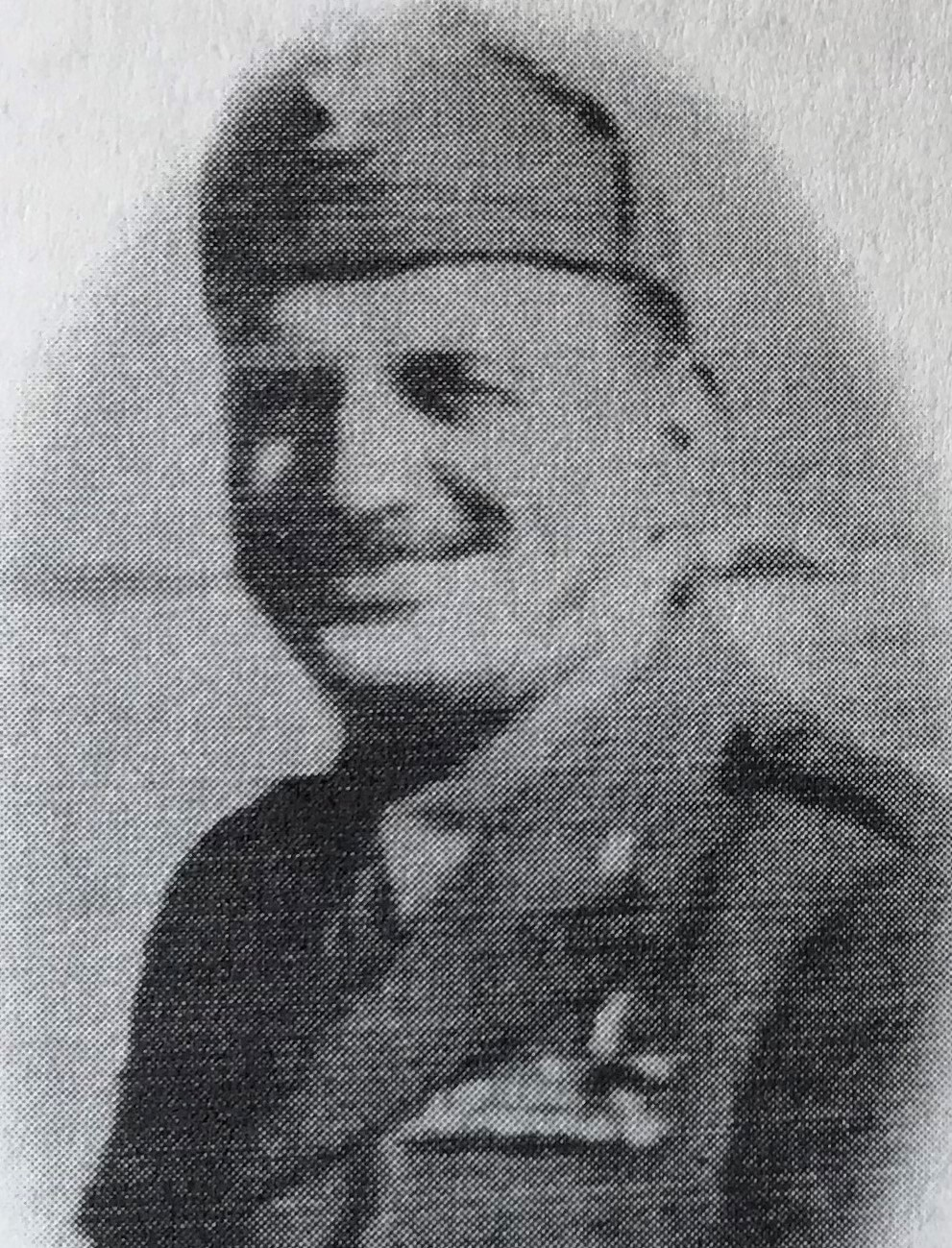
- Born: 16 October 1884; Agazzano, Kingdom of Italy
- Died: 1 October 1943 (aged 58); Sinj, Croatia
- Military career
- Allegiance: Kingdom of Italy
- Branch: Royal Italian Army
- Service years: 1906–1943
- Rank: Major General
- Commands: XVII Coastal Brigade; Split Fortress Area
- Conflicts: World War I; Italian Front; Battles of the Isonzo; Western Front; Second Battle of the Marne; World War II
- Awards: Gold Medal of Military Valor (posthumous); Silver Medal of Military Valor; Order of the Crown of Italy

Alfonso Cigala Fulgosi (16 October 1884 – 1 October 1943) was an Italian general during World War II.

== Biography ==
He was born in Agazzano, province of Piacenza, on October 16, 1884, into a family of the ancient Ligurian nobility (several of his ancestors had been Doges and Captains of the Republic of Genoa). After attending a boarding school run by the Barnabites in Lodi, where he obtained his high school diploma, he entered as a student at the Royal Military Academy of Infantry and Cavalry of Modena in November 1904. He graduated as cavalry second lieutenant in 1906, he was destined to serve at the 8th Regiment "Lancers of Montebello". After promotion to lieutenant in September 1909, he became captain in 1915 while serving in the 3rd "Savoia Cavalleria" Regiment.

After the Kingdom of Italy entered the First World War, on May 24, 1915, Cigala Fulgosi became adjutant of the commander of the 1st Army, General Roberto Brusati. He took part in war operations as commander of a squadron of the 9th Regiment "Lancers of Florence", and was later attached to the 8th Infantry Division. In August 1917 he was seriously wounded on Sveta Gora during the Eleventh Battle of the Isonzo, in an action for which he was awarded the Silver Medal of Military Valor, and in 1918 he followed his division in France, where he participated in the second battle of the Marne.

In 1924 he was promoted to major and held the position of teacher at the Officer Cadet School in Milan, later becoming alternate judge at the Territorial Military Court of Milan until 1927, when he was promoted to the rank of lieutenant colonel and transferred to the Special Center of Cavalry of Sardinia. Later he served at the command of the Udine Army Corps, at the War Ministry and finally at the command of the Milan Army Corps. On December 31, 1936, he was promoted to colonel and in 1940 he was transferred at his request to the reserve, with the rank of brigadier general. In the same year he was appointed President of the Italian Federation of Equestrian Sports (F.I.S.E.).

Alfonso Cigala Fulgosi

On 7 September 1942, again at his request, he was recalled into service as a brigadier general of the reserve, becoming commander of the 17th Coastal Brigade in Dalmatia. After being promoted to the major general of the reserve, he assumed command of the Split Fortress Area. In June 1943 his eldest son, Giuseppe Cigala Fulgosi, an officer in the Royal Italian Navy, was awarded a Gold Medal of Military Valor, Italy's highest military decoration; but on the following day his youngest son, fighter pilot Agostino Giorgio Cigala Fulgosi, was killed in action in the skies of Sardinia.

At the proclamation of the Armistice of Cassibile, on 8 September 1943, Cigala Fulgosi was still in command of the Split Fortress Area, subordinated to General Umberto Spigo's XVIII Army Corps. The area of Split was garrisoned by the 15th Infantry Division Bergamo, under the command of General Emilio Becuzzi, who initially decided to resist the Germans by joining forces with the Yugoslav partisans, but at the same time informed them he would not fight against the former allies. On 11 September Becuzzi held a war council with his officers, suggesting to hand over all weapons to the Yugoslav partisans, abstain from fighting the Germans, and dissolve all Italian units in the area. Both Cigala Fulgosi and General Salvatore Pelligra, commander of the artillery of the XVIII Army Corps, firmly refused to give up their arms, expressing their desire to fight the Germans. The High Command was asked for reinforcements, but instead it sent ships to pick up some 3,000 soldiers on 23 September. General Becuzzi left with them, leaving Pelligra in command; Cigala Fulgosi remained in Split, refusing to leave until all of his men had been evacuated. On the following day the 7th SS Volunteer Mountain Division Prinz Eugen, supported by some squadrons of Junkers Ju 87 dive bombers, captured Split. Obergruppenführer Karl Reichsritter von Oberkamp, commander of the "Prinz Eugen" Division, ordered that all Italian officers who had made common cause with the Yugoslav partisans were to be executed.

Sentenced to death by a drumhead court-martial presided by von Oberkamp, on 1 October 1943 General Cigala Fulgosi was executed by firing squad near Sinj, along with General Pelligra and Brigadier General Angelo Policardi, commander of the Engineers of the XVIII Army Corps. On the following day, another forty-six officers (five colonels, one lieutenant colonel, two majors, twenty-three captains, ten lieutenants and five second lieutenants) were shot near Trilj. According to one account about Cigala Fulgosi's execution,

Facing the firing squad, he asked for one minute, pulled out his gloves and carefully put them on. Then he gave the order: "Fire!"

He was posthumously awarded the Gold Medal of Military Valor.
