= Artillery Command (Italy) =

- Comando Artiglieria
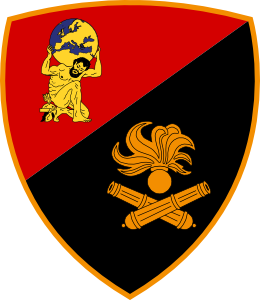
- Coat of arms of the Artillery Command
- Active: 1 October 2010 – present
- Country: Italy
- Branch: Italian Army
- Type: Artillery
- Part of: Operational Land Forces Support Command
- Garrison/HQ: Bracciano
- Patron: Saint Barbara
- Mottos: “Sempre e Dovunque” (“Always and Everywhere”)
- Colours: Red and Black
- Anniversaries: 15 June 1918 (Battle of Solstizio)
- Decorations

Commanders
- Current commander: Gen. B. Fabio Giambartolomei
- Deputy Commander of Field Artillery: Col. Vincenzo Stella

Insignia
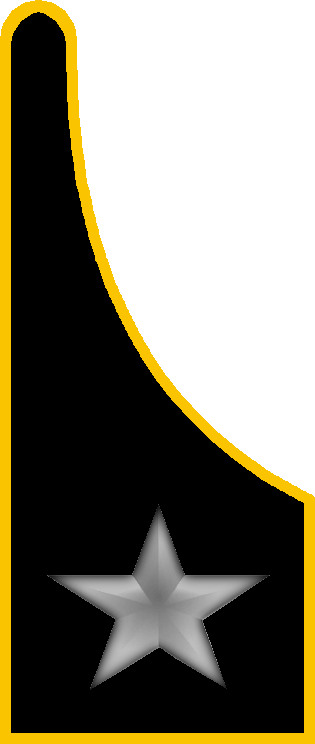
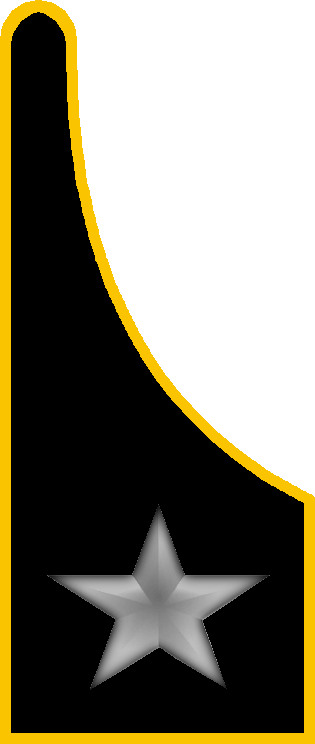
- Artillery arm gorget patches

The Artillery Command (Italian: Comando Artiglieria, COM.ART.) is an Italian Army command, which trains the personnel destined for the army's artillery units, develops the army's artillery doctrine, and supervises the Italian army's artillery units.

The Command keeps the War Flag of the Artillery Arm, which has been decorated with a Military Order of Italy, three Gold Medals of Military Valor, a Silver Medal of Military Valor, and a Bronze Medal of Military Valor.

== History ==
In its current form, the Artillery Command was set up on 1 October 2010 in the Bracciano headquarters, following the suppression of the Artillery Brigade Command, based in Portogruaro, and of the Artillery School, based in Bracciano.

=== Artillery Brigade ===
Roots of the Artillery Brigade date back to 1959 in a series of commands that, over time, have carried out managerial functions for the artillery assigned to the 5th Army Corps.

==== Missile Brigade ====
The first unit to carry out this role was the III Missile Brigade, established on 1 October 1959. In 1977, renamed the 3rd Missile Brigade "Aquileia", the Brigade also assumed the functions of Artillery Command for the 5th Army Corps.

On 1 March 1959 the 3rd Heavy Artillery Regiment activated two missile groups armed with Honest John Missile systems. On 1 October 1959 the regiment's name was changed to 3rd Heavy Artillery Regiment (Missiles) and it became the first unit of the newly raised III Missile Brigade in Vicenza. The regiment added a third missile group on 15 November 1960 and a fourth missile group on 15 November 1962. Each group fielded four Honest John launch systems and were based in Elvas, Oderzo, Codogné and Portogruaro.

In summer 1973 the 3rd Missile Artillery Regiment began the transition to the MGM-52 Lance missile system. On 27 July 1975 the 3rd Missile Group "Volturno" fired the first Lance missiles on Italian soil from the Salto di Quirra military firing range at Perdasdefogu in Sardinia. After the successful launch the group was declared operational. The same year the Italian army abolished the regimental level, moved from Roman numerals to Arabic numerals and awarded new honorific titles to units. Therefore, the brigade became the 3rd Missile Brigade "Aquileia".

With the end of the Cold War the Italian Army began to draw down its forces. One of the seven brigades that were disbanded in 1991 was the 3rd Missile Brigade "Aquileia". On 30 November 1991 the brigade was disbanded, but on 1 December 1991 the 3rd Artillery Regiment "Aquileia" was activated in Portogruaro with brigade's staff and the remaining units of the brigade. The remaining units passed to 5th Army Corps.

==== From the 5th Army Corps to the COM.F.O.TER. ====
On 1 October 1982 the artillery management functions within the 5th Army Corps passed to the 5th Corps Artillery Command based in Vittorio Veneto. The Artillery Command moved to Treviso on 1 November 1986. Following the disestablishment of the Divisions of the Italian Army, the Command obtained the Artillery Groups formerly belonging of the disestablished Divisions:

- 5th Field Artillery Group "Superga" from the Infantry Division "Mantova";
- 14th Field Artillery Group "Murge"
- 155th Heavy Field Artillery Group "Emilia"
- 132nd Heavy Field Artillery Group "Rovereto"
- 33rd Heavy Field Artillery Group "Terni"
- 5th Artillery Specialists Group "Medea"
- 6th Artillery Specialists Group "Montello"
- 7th Artillery Specialists Group "Casarsa"
- 9th Heavy Artillery Group "Rovigo" from the 3rd Missile Brigade "Aquileia"
- 41st Artillery Specialists Group "Cordenons" from the 3rd Missile Brigade "Aquileia"

In 1991 the 14th Field Artillery Group "Murge" and 5th, 6th and 7th artillery specialists groups were disbanded and 5th, 33rd, 41st, 132nd and 155th groups entered the 5th Heavy Field Artillery Regiment.

In 1992 the 155th Heavy Field Artillery Group "Emilia" was disbanded, while the 5th Group being upgraded to Regiment. As of late 1992, the Artillery Command had the 5th Regiment (with 33rd, 41st and 132nd Groups), the 5th Field Artillery Regiment "Superga", the 3rd Heavy Artillery Regiment "Volturno", the 27th Heavy Self-propelled Artillery Regiment "Marche" and the 13th Target Acquisition Group "Aquileia".

The 5th Regiment was disbanded on 31 March 1993. The 33rd Group became the 33rd Artillery Regiment "Acqui", the 41st Group passed directly under the Artillery Command and the 132nd Artillery Group "Rovereto" was disbanded. On 30 September 1993 the 13th Target Acquisition Group was disbanded. In 1995, the 27th Heavy Self-propelled Artillery Regiment "Marche" was disbanded and the Artillery Command moved to Portogruaro. In 1996 the 41st Group was transferred to the C.I.D.E. in Anzio.

The attributions of the 5th Corps Artillery Command passed, on 30 November 1997, to the Artillery Group Command. On 1 December 1997, the Artillery Group Command became the Artillery Group Command of the Land Operational Forces, taking five artillery regiments under it, including the Field Artillery Regiment "a Cavallo".

==== Artillery Brigade: 2002–2010 ====
Following the restructuring measures put in place since the early 2000s, the Artillery Group Command was reorganized into the Artillery Brigade in January 2002, together with the other Combat Support Commands, with four Regiments: three artillery regiments and one NBCR defence regiment. The Artillery Brigade inherited traditions of both Artillery Group Command and 3rd Missile Brigade "Aquileia".

The Artillery Brigade was established consisting of two echelons, one aimed at preparing the dependent units, while the other was intended for the establishment of the Commands in operations or for reinforcement with specialists from other Commands engaged in operations. The reorganization led to the designation of "Brigade" (rather than "Grouping") being adopted, including the Brigade Staff in order to perform all the functions of the Brigade Staff at the Brigade level.

On 30 September 2010 the Artillery Brigade was disestablished and merged into the present-day Artillery Command.

=== Artillery School ===
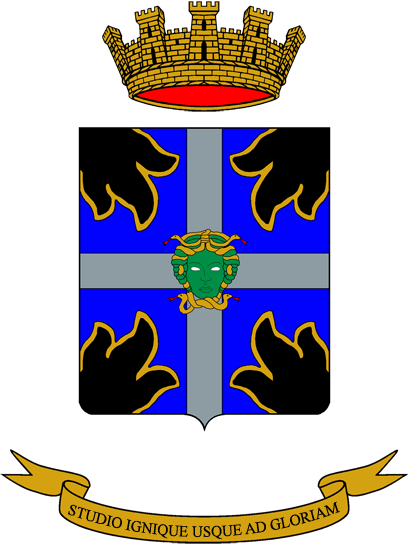
Coat of Arms of the Training Regiment of the Artillery School.

Training establishments related to artillery date back to the 18th century, when King Charles Emmanuel III of Sardinia established the Royal School of Artillery and Fortification. In 1821, it was merged with the existing Royal Military Academy and assumed the name of Application School of Artillery and Engineering.

==== The origins: 1888–1915 ====
The traditions of the School of Artillery draw their origins from the "Central School of Artillery Shooting" (Scuola Centrale di Tiro di Artiglieria), established on 1 July 1888 (Royal Decree No. 131 of 24 June 1888) in Nettuno. The School was established in order to give adequate impetus to the professional education of cadres and to give artillery training a unitary direction, supported by application standards corresponding to the performance of weapons. In 1894, at the Bracciano shooting range, the first training course on firing with fortress and siege artillery was held for Fortress Artillery Officers.

Following the 1910 Spingardi Reform, on 9 August 1910, the school split, giving rise to two distinct schools, the Central School of Field Artillery (including mountain artillery and horse artillery) which remained in Nettuno, and the Central Fortress Artillery School, which was established in Rome with a shooting range in Bracciano.

During the First World War the two schools lost their didactic function. In Bracciano a Training Group was established for the preparation of personnel for the specialist units. In Nettuno a special "Experimental Section" was established at the Central School of Artillery with experimental and testing tasks in order to rapidly upgrade and modernize the artilleries. On the other hand, personnel training took place in the depots located behind the front. Among them, should be remembered that of Spilimbergo, which assumed the name of Shooting School.

==== Between wars: Civitavecchia ====
In 1920, the two schools merged into the Central Artillery School in Bracciano, in the reorganization process which concentrated the combat schools in the area. In 1925 the Artillery Central School was transferred in Civitavecchia, directly under the Army General Staff.

In 1921, the Experimental Section in Nettuno, which had been considerably strengthened during the conflict, became autonomous, first establishing itself in the Directorate of Artillery Experiences and, subsequently, in 1927, in the Artillery Experience Centre.

The courses were held mainly for Officers who were preparing to take up the posts of group or regimental commander. The courses were organized according to a tripartite scheme:

- a first period, common, necessary to give a panoramic and general vision of the use of the units of the various branches according to the dictates of the current doctrine;
- a second period, at the respective branch school, in which Officers deepened the study of the characteristics and technique of the weapon they belong to;
- a third period, again in common, which ensured, through practical exercises and maneuvers with cadres, the acquisition of operational concepts concerning joint cooperation.

The School did not have its own Units. For the exercises it had the regiments of the 52nd Infantry Division "Torino", also based in Civitavecchia, and permanently received in aggregation from other bodies the Groups or Batteries of the non-divisional artillery specialties.

In 1927 the Artillery Shooting School, aimed to troops and enlisted personnel, was reestablished and reactivated in Nettuno. The Artillery Shooting School was directly under the Inspector of Artillery.

==== Second World War ====
During the Second World War the activity of the Shooting School of Neptune had a notable increase, above all to retrain the ranks of reservists called to arms who had to constitute or complete the Artillery units.

In 1944 the Central School of Artillery was hit by the allied landing which destroyed the Artillery Experience Center. At the end of the war, the Experience Center remained in Nettuno and was strengthened, also incorporating the Infantry Experience Center of Santa Severa as the 5th Experience Section.

==== After Second World War: 1946–2010 ====
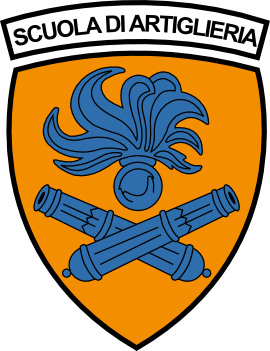
Shoulder patch of the former Artillery School.

After the Second World War, the reconstruction was not long in coming. On 27 January 1945, the 152nd Artillery Regiment "Piceno" moved to Bracciano assuming the following organic constitution:

- Command;
- School and Artillery Complements Group;
- School and Engineer Complements Battalion;
- Mixed complements battalion.

On 10 April 1945, the 152nd Artillery Regiment "Piceno" was renamed "Artillery Training Regiment". On 15 January 1946 the Artillery Training Regiment was renamed Artillery School. Definitively returned to Bracciano, the School was unified into a single institute and placed under the Military Central Schools Command. In 1946 the School of Mechanics of Artillery Workers of Civitavecchia passed under the control of the School of Artillery of Bracciano, of which it became a detachment.

Chief of Army Staff Luigi Efisio Marras in 1947 strengthened the Officers Schools: the Schools of Arms Cooperation (Scuola Cooperazione Varie Armi, S.CO.V.A.), grouping the Schools in Civitavecchia, was established in the same year. On 25 October, the Artillery School was granted the task of keeping the War Flag of the Arm of Artillery.

In 1948, with the establishment of the 1st Battery of reserve officers cadets, the Artillery School also assumed the nature of a training institute for reserve cadres, while it lost the Anti-aircraft detachments of Bracciano, Sabaudia and Civitavecchia. In 1949 the XI Field Artillery Group was moved to the then-V Territorial Military Command in Padua.

In 1951, the Artillery School gave birth to a new specialty with the establishment of an Artillery Light Aviation Unit, which was later renamed Army Light Aviation Unit; in 1958 the Army Light Aviation Unit was transferred to Viterbo, thus giving rise to the Army Aviation.

In 1954 the Reserve Officers and Sub-officers School was established in Foligno, with the exception of the self-propelled speciality and the Artillery specialists who kept their headquarters in Bracciano, both under the VIII Territorial Military Command of Rome.

In 1956 the artillery training sector was reorganized. The command of all the Artillery Schools was entrusted to a General, who was supported by:

- a Colonel, Deputy Commander;
- a Colonel, Course Director
- a Colonel, commander of the Reserve Officers and Sub-officers School in Foligno.

The Deputy Commander oversaw the entire logistical and administrative organization of the School and also performed the functions of Corps Commander in relation to the demonstration Units. The Colonel, Course Director, on the other hand, presided over the didactic organization, making use of the activities of some "units". In 1956 a "Technical Application Course" was launched for the training of Artillery Officers.

In 1964, the School was again reorganized. The Commanding General, in turn dependent on the Inspector of the Arm of Artillery, had under its dependencies a Chief of Staff as coordinator of the activity, both disciplinary and logistic, of the whole school complex. The actual training part was carried out within four "Courses Units":

- The first Course Unit provided for the organization and development of the courses the Captains to be promoted.
- The second Course Unit provided for the development of courses for reserve officers and Subofficers and for student team leaders of the missile and self-propelled specialties.
- The third Course Unit included all the operational units of the School as well as the Light Aircraft Section and some batteries for non-divisional specialties. In addition to the personnel training, it also provided units and means for the training for those attending the Courses, for carrying out demonstration, cooperation and experience exercises; moreover, it organized the Technical-Application Course and refresher courses for the personnel of all ranks recalled from leave.
- The fourth Course Unit, located in Civitavecchia, also included a demonstration specialist Battery and took care of the training at all levels of the personnel assigned to the specialist unit.

In January 1976 the Army established two Artillery Groups, operational and demonstrative pawns of the School: the 1st Self-Propelled Field Artillery Group "Cacciatori delle Alpi", formed from the 8th Army Corps Self-propelled Field Artillery Group, and the 18th Field Artillery Group "Gran Sasso" formed from the 1st Group of the 13th Artillery Regiment. On 2 May 1976 the 1st Group inherited the War Flag, the Red Tie and the Garibaldi traditions of the 1st Artillery Regiment.

These two Artillery Groups were joined by an A.U.C. Group, which took care of the training and training of the Reserve Officer Cadets and the Subfofficers of the self-propelled specialities, the Specialists Group and a Support Unit.

In June 1981, with the dissolution of the School of Artillery Officers and Subfofficers in Foligno which took care of the training of the students of mechanical towing specialities, the 18th Group was suppressed and transformed into the Mechanical Towing A.U.C. Group, while the 1st Artillery Group lost the "Self-propelled" designation and became the demonstrative group of the School. All activities were thus concentrated in Bracciano. On 15 June 1986, the War Flag drape was replaced.

Subsequent reorganizations led to the dissolution of the Specialists Group and of the Support Unit. The latter one was later reconstituted once the two A.U.C. Groups were merged into a single training institution. From 1 October 1997 to September 2009, the School Commander carried out the command activity on the Training and Experimentation Centre for the Anti-Aircraft Artillery of Sabaudia. The Commander also assumed the position of Deputy Inspector of the Arm of Artillery on the same date.

On 12 November 1999, the 1st Artillery Group "Cacciatori delle Alpi" was disestablished and its flag returned to the Shrine of the Flags at the Altare della Patria in Rome. The Artillery School was reorganized into a Training Group and a Support Group.

On 1 February 2006 a new organization was introduced. The General Staff was reorganised and the Training Regiment was established on 1 March 2006; at the same time, the Logistics Support Group and the Training Group were dissolved. The establishment of the Training Regiment was decided in order to optimize the performance of the institutional tasks of the School of Artillery and to develop the training activity. On 30 September 2010 the School was disestablished and merged into the present-day Artillery Command.

=== Artillery Command ===
The Artillery Command was established on 1 October 2010 in Bracciano on the basis of the Artillery School. The Artillery Command was the result of the merger of the Inspectorate of the Arm of Artillery, of the Artillery Brigade and of the Artillery School.

== List of commanders ==
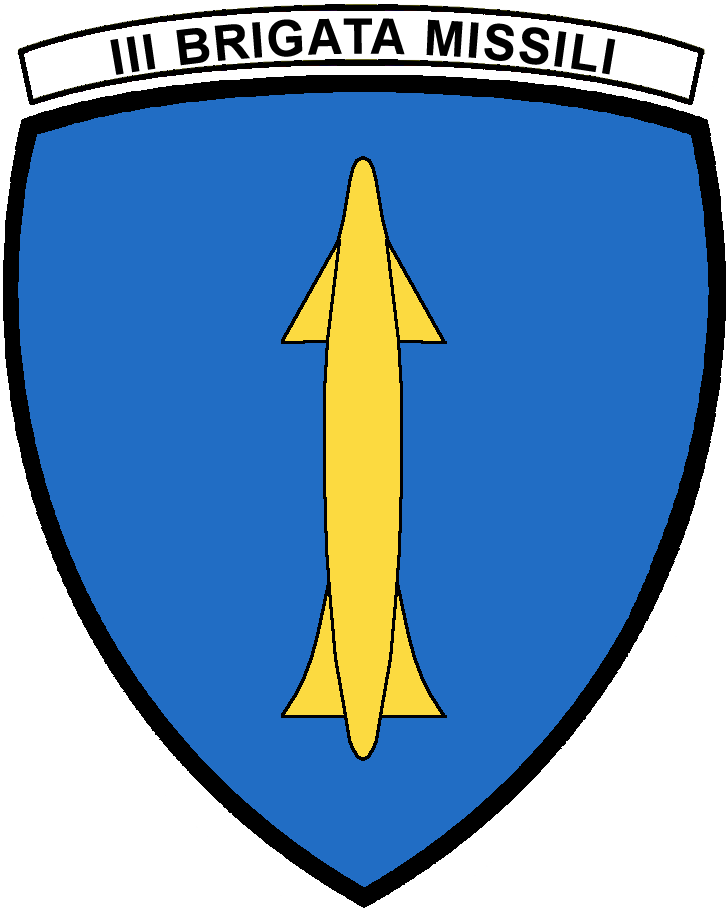
The 3rd Missile Brigade "Aquileia" gave birth to the Army-wide Artillery Command.

The Italian Artillery has had, as of 2020, 73 commanders.

=== Central School of Artillery Shooting (1888–1910) ===
- Ten. Gen. Enrico Giovannetti (1 July 1888 – 29 December 1889);
- Ten. Gen. Orazio Galleani di Sainte Ambroise (19 January 1889 – 31 December 1894);
- Col. Tommaso Schellini (1 January 1895 – 15 February 1895);
- Ten. Col. Aldo Rossi (1 November 1895 – 15 February 1896);
- Col. Emanuele Carrano (12 November 1896 – 3 February 1897);
- Col. Angelo De Luigi (15 October 1897 – 31 May 1898);
- Col. Edoardo De Fabii Pezzani (1 June 1898 – 19 November 1898);
- Col. Giorgio Recli (19 November 1898 – 20 January 1901);
- Ten. Col. Alberto Zola (21 January 1901 – 8 November 1901);
- Col. Giovanni Pila (8 November 1901 – 21 October 1903);
- Col. Felice D'Alessandro (21 October 1903 – 20 January 1907);
- Col. Benedetto Sanfermano (21 January 1907 – 28 November 1909);
- Col. Giulio Strazzeri (28 November 1909 – 30 September 1910).

=== Fortress Artillery School (1910–1919) ===
- Col. Antonio Arnaldi (1910);
- Col. Alfredo Sacchi (1910–1914);
- Col. Giuliano Ricci (15 January 1914 – 10 August 1916).

=== Central School of Field Artillery (1910–1919) ===
- Col. Giulio Strazzeri (1910–1914);
- Col. Pasquale Tozzi (1914–1915);
- Magg. Innocenzo Cipriani (acting);
- Col. Vittorio Buffa di Perrero (1916–1918).

=== Central Artillery School (1920–1943) ===
- Col. Alessandro Del Pozzo (1920–1924);
- Col. Aurelio Ricchetti (20 March 1924 – 22 April 1926);
- Col. Emilio Gamerra (1926–1928);
- Col. Alberto Barbieri (1928–1930);
- Col. Giovanni Zanghieri (1930–1934);
- Col. Pietro Belletti (1934–1937);
- Col. Mario Balotta (1937–1939);
- Col. Umberto Utili (1939–1940);
- Col. Salvatore Pelligra (1940–1942);
- Col. Armando Marasca (1942–1943).

=== Artillery School (1946–2010) ===
- Col. Marcello Palma (1945–1947);
- Col. Mario Brunelli (1947–1951);
- Col. Antonino Duran (1951–1952);
- Col. Alessandro Boselli (1952–1955);
- Col. Michele Giardino (1955–1956);
- Gen. B. Eugenio Coloni (1956–1959);
- Gen. B. Salvatore Pesce (1959–1962);
- Gen. B. Francesco Angioni (1962–1964);
- Gen. B. Mario Palla (1964–1968);
- Gen. B. Aldo Maglietta (1968–1972);
- Gen. B. Natalino Maggiorano (1972–1974);
- Gen. B. Gabriele Starace (1974–1977);
- Gen. B. Pietro F. Muraro (1977–1979);
- Gen. B. Luigi Palmieri (1979–1982);
- Gen. B. Bruno Mori (1982–1985);
- Gen. B. Mario Prato (1985–1989);
- Gen. B. Enzo Conte (1989–1991);
- Gen. B. Giulio Fraticelli (1991–1992);
- Gen. B. Antonino Mozzicato (1992–1994);
- Gen. B. Filippo Salvati (1994–1995);
- Gen. D. Giangiuseppe Santillo (1995–1997);
- Gen. C.A. Giuseppe Morea (2000–2002);
- Gen. D. Carlo Tritonj (2002–2005);
- Col. Alfonso Bonassisa (2005);
- Gen. B. Sergio Fiorentino (2005–2007);
- Gen. D. Paolo Reghenspurger (2007–2008);
- Gen. B. Pippo Filipponi (2008–2010).

=== Artillery Group Command (1997–2002) ===
- Brig. Gen. Antonio Di Gennaro (1 December 1997 – 4 March 1999);
- Brig. Gen. Rocco Pannuzzi (5 March 1999 – 9 August 2000);
- Brig. Gen. Roberto Tuccinardi (10 August 2000 – 20 September 2001).

=== Artillery Brigade (2002–2010) ===
- Brig. Gen. Roberto Bernardini (21 September 2001 – 27 November 2002);
- Brig. Gen. Claudio Tozzi (28 November 2002 – 6 October 2004);
- Gen. B. Pasquale Fierro (7 October 2004 – 25 January 2005);
- Gen. B. Leonardo Di Marco (26 January 2006 – 30 August 2007);
- Gen. B. Amedeo Sperotto (31 August 2007 – 27 October 2008);
- Gen. B. Nicola Gelao (28 October 2008 – 15 September 2009);
- Gen. B. Antonio Romeo (16 September 2009 – 30 September 2010).

=== Artillery Command (2010–onward) ===
- Gen. D. Paolo Ruggiero (1 October 2010 – February 2012);
- Gen. D. Giovanni Domenico Pintus (February 2012 – 27 August 2015);
- Col. Manuel Cecchi (acting, 27 August 2015 – 9 October 2015);
- Gen. B. Fabio Giambartolomei (9 October 2015 - 12 November 2021).
- Gen. B. Francesco Principe (12 November 2021 - 10 September 2021)
- Gen. B. Gianluca Figus (10 September 2024 - present)

== Mission ==
The Artillery Command performs training functions through the training regiment and operational functions through three artillery regiments, a regiment for NBC defense and the regiment for operational communication at its dependencies.

Another task is to provide joint fire support element to guarantee the commander at various levels the correct management of the fire request and interventions.

== Organization ==
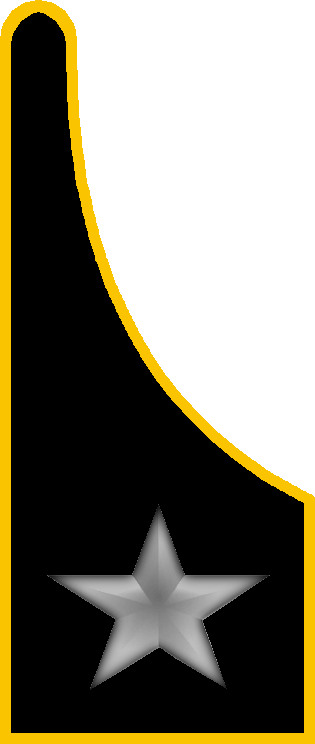
Artillery gorget patch (left).

The Artillery Command (COMART) is placed under the Operational Land Forces Support Command. During operations and exercises, a brigade-level artillery command post is identified under the NATO Rapid Deployable Corps – Italy command in Solbiate Olona.

The organization of the Artillery Command includes four sections:

- Fires Supporting & Targeting;
- INFOOPS;
- FIRES-FAC;
- Systems and Simulation.

The Commander, a brigadier general who also holds the positions of Commander of Artillery and Inspector of Artillery, is supported by several bodies:

- Deputy Commander;
- Chief of Staff;
- Administration Office;
- Personnel Office;
- Doctrine, Studies, Lessons Learned Office;
- Operations, Training and Information Office;
- Logistic Office;
- C4 Office;
- Spiritual Assistance Service;
- Verification and Validation Section;
- Carabinieri Team;
- Headquarters Unit.

=== Subordinate commands ===
The Artillery Command directly controls four Artillery Regiments, including the Training Regiment:

- Artillery Command, in Bracciano (Lazio)
  - 3rd Targeting Support Regiment "Bondone", in Cassino (Lazio) with unmanned aerial vehicles
  - 5th Field Artillery Regiment "Superga", in Portogruaro (Veneto) with M270A1 MLRS-I
  - 7th CBRN Defense Regiment "Cremona", in Civitavecchia (Lazio) with VAB armoured personnel carriers in the CBRN configuration
  - 52nd Field Artillery Regiment "Torino", in Persano (Campania) with PzH 2000 self-propelled howitzers
  - Training Group, in Bracciano (Lazio)
  - Fires & Targeting and Info Ops Centre (Italian: Centro Fires & Targeting e Info Ops), in Bracciano (Lazio)

== See also ==
- Structure of the Italian Army
- Operational Land Forces Support Command
- 3rd Missile Brigade "Aquileia"
- Artillery School (Italy)
