= Artillery Training Regiment (Italy) =

Training Regiment
- Reggimento Addestrativo
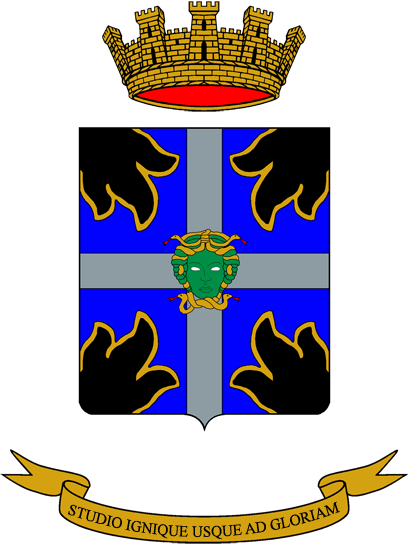
- Coat of Arms of the Training Regiment of the Artillery School.
- Active: 1 March 2006 - Present
- Country: Italy
- Branch: Italian Army
- Type: Artillery
- Role: Artillery training
- Part of: Artillery Command
- Garrison/HQ: Bracciano
- Motto: Latin: Studio ignique usque ad gloriam
- Anniversaries: 15 June 1918 (Battle of Solstizio)

The Training Regiment (Italian: Reggimento Addestrativo) of the Artillery Command is the military unit responsible for providing ground artillery training to the units and personnel of the Italian Army. Made up of professional personnel, the Regiment is stationed in Bracciano (Rome).

The Training Regiment operates the OTO Melara Mod 56 howitzer on the Janiculum Hill in Rome.

== History ==
The Regiment is the heir of the units deployed at the Artillery School. It was established on 1 March 2006 within the now-dissolved Artillery School, by merging and replacing the Training and Support Groups, with Colonel Federico Ralli as its first Commander.

The Training Regiment inherits the traditions of:

- 152nd Artillery Regiment "Piceno";
- 1st Group of the 13th Artillery Regiment;
- 1st Self-Propelled Field Artillery Group "Cacciatori delle Alpi";
- 18th Artillery Group "Gran Sasso";
- Self-propelled A.U.C. Group;
- Mechanical Towing A.U.C. Group;
- Specialists Group;
- Support Unit;
- Training Group;
- Support Group.

Following the 2010 reorganization of the Italian Army, the Training Regiment has been moved under the Artillery Command.

== Organization ==
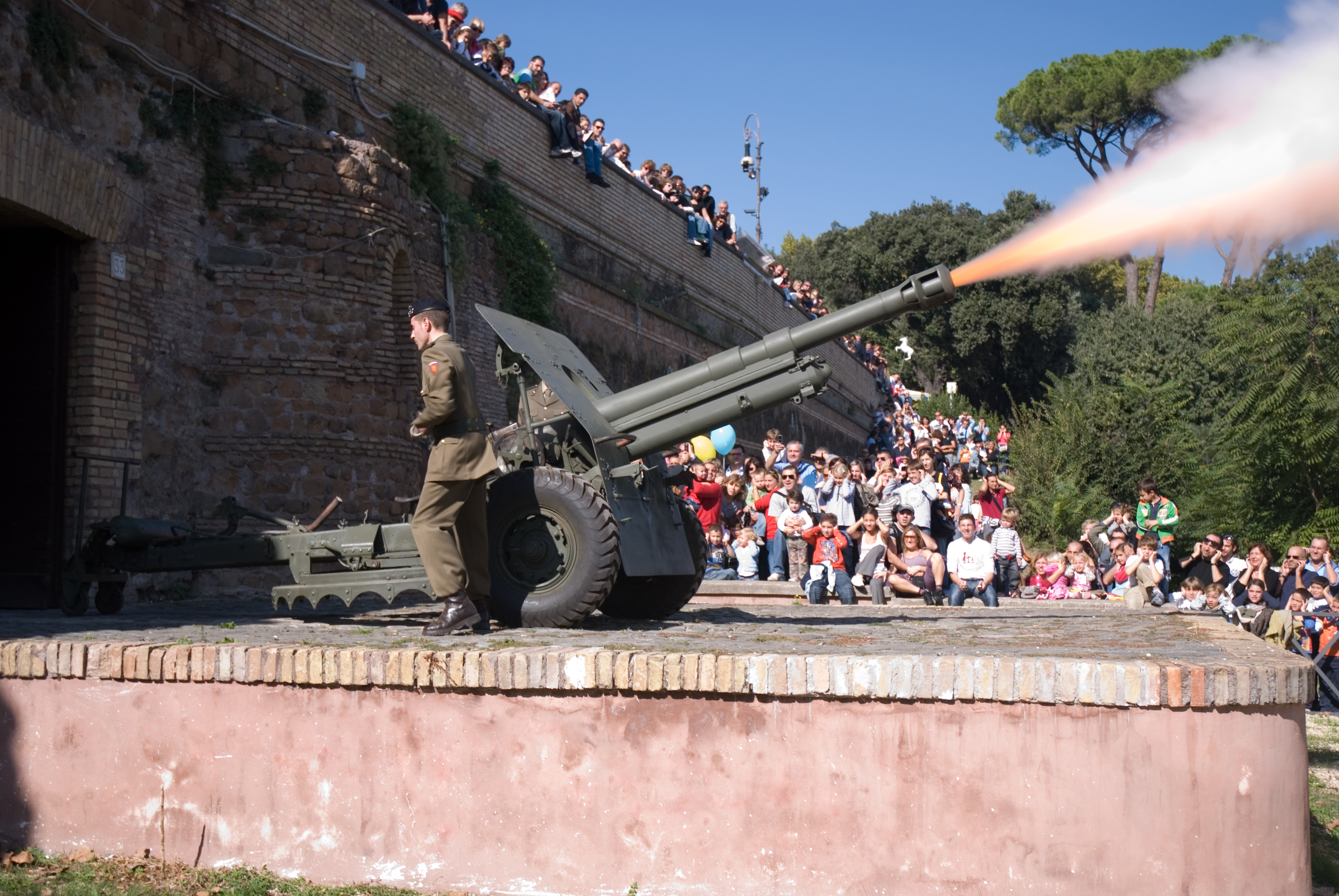
The Training Regiment operates the 105/14 howitzer on Janiculum.

The Training Regiment is currently structured on:

- Regimental Command;
- Operational and support Batteries;
- Training Group, on four Batteries;
- Didactic Department.

=== Regimental Command ===
The Regimental Command, with the Logistics Battery, has the task of enabling the Regiment to operate in the best possible way under the tactical and logistical aspect and in the many activities to which it is called to operate, supporting it and supplying it with everything of which the Regiment may need.

=== Training Group ===
The Training Group is a Battalion-level unit. The Group has the task of conducting the training and specialization of the Pupils Marshals and Sergeants, and the qualification, updating and specialization of Officers, NCOs, Volunteers in fixed position and in permanent service. The Training Group also organizes and conducts shooting schools.

== See also ==
- Artillery Command (Italy)
- Artillery School (Italy)
