= 5th Field Artillery Regiment "Superga" =

Active Italian Army missile artillery unit

- 5° Reggimento Artiglieria Terrestre "Superga"
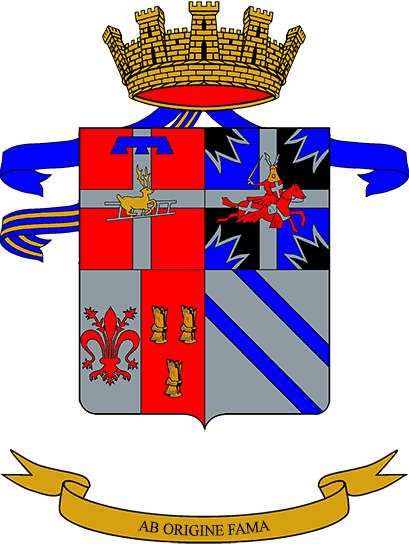
- Regimental coat of arms
- Active: 1 Oct. 1850 – 12 May 1943; 1 Jan. 1947 – today
- Country: Italy
- Branch: Italian Army
- Part of: Artillery Command
- Garrison/HQ: Portogruaro
- Motto: "Ab origine fama"
- Anniversaries: 15 June 1918 – Second Battle of the Piave River
- Decorations: 2× Bronze Medals of Military Valor; 1× Bronze Medal of Army Valor

Insignia
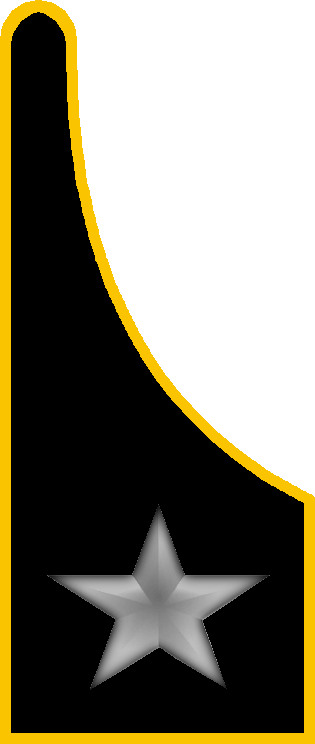
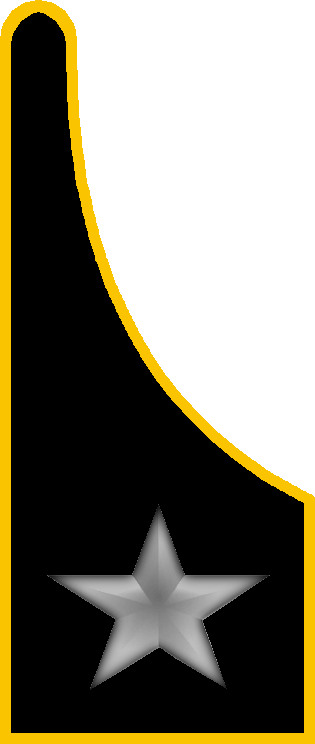
- Regimental gorget patches

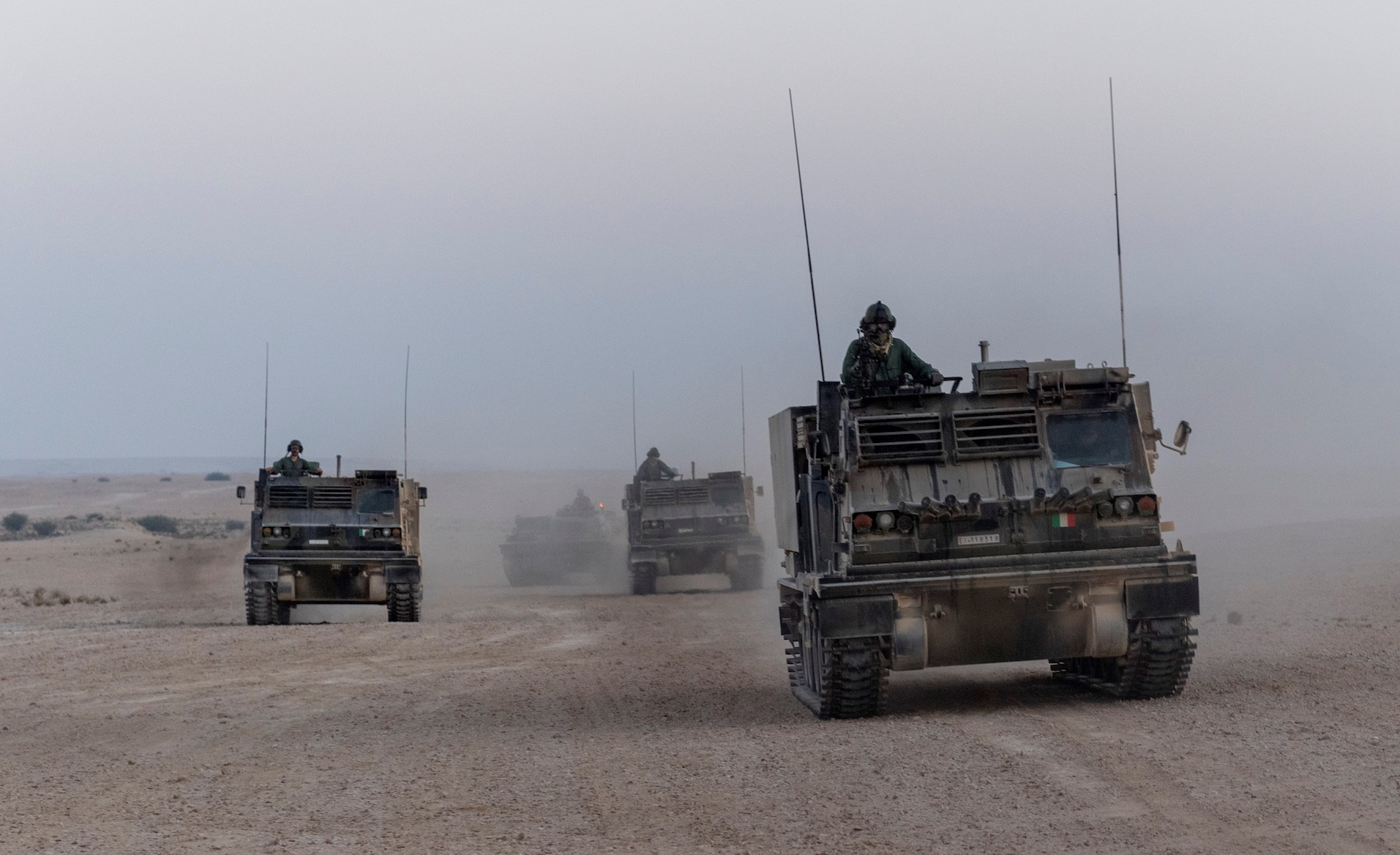
5th Field Artillery Regiment "Superga" M270E1 MLRS-I during an exercise in Qatar

The 5th Field Artillery Regiment "Superga" (Italian: 5° Reggimento Artiglieria Terrestre "Superga") is a field artillery regiment of the Italian Army. The regiment is the army's only multiple rocket launcher unit and equipped with M270A1 MLRS-I launchers. The regiment is based in Portogruaro in Veneto and assigned to the Artillery Command. The regiment is the Italian Army's senior artillery regiment and was formed in 1850 by the Royal Sardinian Army. In 1855–56 the regiment deployed six batteries to Crimea for the Crimean War and in 1859 it fought in the Second Italian War of Independence. In the 1860 it participated in the Sardinian campaign in Central and Southern Italy. In 1861 the regiment joined the Royal Italian Army and in 1866 it fought in the Third Italian War of Independence. During World War I the regiment served on the Italian front. In 1935 the regiment was assigned to the 1st Infantry Division "Superga", which in 1940 participated in the invasion of France. In fall 1942 the division was transferred to Tunisia for the Tunisian campaign. The division and its regiments surrendered there to the British forces on 12 May 1943.

The regiment was reformed in 1947 and assigned to the Infantry Division "Mantova". In 1975 the regiment was reduced to 5th Heavy Self-propelled Field Artillery Group "Superga" and assigned to the Mechanized Division "Mantova". In 1986 group was transferred to the Artillery Command of the 5th Army Corps. In 1992 the group was reorganized as a regiment. In 1997 the regiment was transferred to the army's Artillery Grouping and in 2001 the regiment took over the personnel, materiel, and base of the 3rd Heavy Artillery Regiment "Volturno" in Portogruaro. The regimental anniversary falls, as for all Italian Army artillery regiments, on June 15, the beginning of the Second Battle of the Piave River in 1918.

This article is about the Royal Italian Army's 5th Field Artillery Regiment, which was a support unit assigned to a division-level command. This regiment is unrelated to the 5th Heavy Field Artillery Regiment, which was a support unit assigned to a corps-level command, and unrelated to the 5th Heavy Artillery Regiment, which was a support unit assigned to an army-level command.

== History ==
=== Italian Wars of Independence ===
After the Kingdom of Sardinia lost the First Italian War of Independence the Royal Sardinian Army's artillery was reorganized and on 1 October 1850 three artillery regiments were formed, which united the existing artillery brigades, batteries, and companies by function:

- Fortress Artillery Regiment
  - 2× Fortress brigades, with 6× companies per brigade
- Field Artillery Regiment
  - 6× Field brigades, with 3× batteries per brigade
  - Horse brigade with 2× batteries
- Workers Regiment
  - Workers Brigade, with 2× companies
  - Pontieri Brigade, with 2× companies
  - Gunsmiths Company
  - Gunpowder Workers Company
  - Artificer Company
  - Depot Company

In 1855–56 the regiment's 1st, 4th, 7th, 10th, 13th and 16th batteries were assigned to the Sardinian Expeditionary Corps, which was deployed to Crimea during the Crimean War. In 1859 the regiment participated in the Second Italian War of Independence and fought in the Battle of Palestro, Battle of Magenta, and Battle of Solferino. After the war, on 7 October 1859, the regiment was renamed 1st Field Artillery Regiment and ceded 15 of its batteries to help form the 2nd Field Artillery Regiment. On 22 March 1860 the Kingdom of Sardinia annexed the Royal Provinces of Emilia and the Grand Duchy of Tuscany. Consequently, on 25 March 1860, the artillery units of the annexed territories were integrated into the Royal Sardinian Army: six field batteries, six fortress companies, and one workers company from the Tuscan Army, and nine field batteries, six fortress companies, and one workers company from the Emilian Army. The influx of artillery units and the growth of units in the runup to and during the war necessitated a new organization of the Piedmontese artillery.

On 17 June 1860, which today is celebrated as the founding date of the Italian Army's Artillery Arm, four new regiments were ordered to be formed on 1 July 1860: the 3rd Regiment — Fortress Regiment, the 4th Regiment — Fortress Regiment, the 7th Regiment — Field Regiment, and the 8th Regiment — Field Regiment; while on the same day the Workers Regiment was to be renamed 1st Regiment — Workers Regiment, with the Fortress Artillery Regiment destined to become the 2nd Regiment — Fortress Regiment, and the 1st Field Artillery Regiment and 2nd Field Artillery Regiment, slated to be renamed 5th Regiment — Field Regiment and 6th Regiment — Field Regiment.

On 1 July 1860 the 1st Field Artillery Regiment was renamed 5th Regiment — Field Regiment and ceded nine field batteries to help form the 7th Regiment — Field Regiment. In turn the regiment incorporated four Tuscan and Emilian field batteries as replacement. The regiment also retained the two horse batteries of its predecessor and then consisted of twelve batteries. Immediately afterwards the regiment's batteries participated in the Sardinian campaign in Central and Southern Italy, where they fought in the Battle of Castelfidardo, the Siege of Ancona, and the Siege of Gaeta. In the Battle of Castelfidardo the regiment's 2nd Battery distinguished itself and was awarded a Bronze Medal of Military Valor, which was affixed to the regiment's flag and is depicted on the regiment's coat of arms. By 1861, the regiment consisted of 14 field batteries and two horse batteries.

On 8 March September 1863 the regiment ceded three batteries to help form the 10th Artillery Regiment — Field Regiment. In 1866 the regiment participated in the Third Italian War of Independence and fought in the Battle of Custoza and the Battle of Bezzecca. On 13 November 1870 the regiment was renamed 5th Artillery Regiment and fielded now a mix of fortress companies, field batteries, and horse batteries. On 1 January 1871 the regiment ceded three field batteries to help form the 11th Artillery Regiment and in October of the same year the last two horse batteries were reorganized as field batteries. On 30 September 1873 the regiment ceded its remaining four fortress companies to help form the 11th Fortress Artillery Regiment. On 29 June 1882 the regiment was renamed 8th Field Artillery Regiment.

On 1 November 1884 the regiment ceded two batteries to help from the 11th Field Artillery Regiment and on 1 November 1888 the regiment ceded eight batteries and one train company to help form the 17th Field Artillery Regiment. On 1 October 1891 the regiment reorganized two of its field batteries as mountain batteries. On 31 December 1893 the regiment exchanged four of its field batteries for two mountain batteries from the 8th Field Artillery Regiment and two mountain batteries from the 11th Field Artillery Regiment. On 1 March 1895 the regiment ceded the six mountain batteries to the Mountain Artillery Regiment. In turn the regiment received a field battery from each of the following five field artillery regiment: 2nd, 6th, 9th, 11th, and 12th.

In 1895–96 the regiment's 11th Battery was deployed to Eritrea for the First Italo-Ethiopian War. The regiment also provided personnel and materiel to form the 2nd Battery for the war and provided 13 officers and 293 troops to augment deployed units. During the Italo-Turkish War in 1911–12 the regiment formed the command of a Special Field Artillery Regiment, which was sent with two of the regiment's group commands and the regiment's 2nd and 6th batteries to Libya. On 1 March 1912 the regiment ceded its II Group to help form the 25th Field Artillery Regiment and on 1 April 1912 the regiment ceded some of its personnel to help form the 1st Heavy Field Artillery Regiment.

=== World War I ===
At the outbreak of World War I the regiment was assigned to the V Army Corps as the corps' artillery regiment. At the time the regiment consisted of a command, three groups with a combined eight batteries equipped with 75/27 mod. 11 field guns, and a depot. During the war the regiment's depot in Venaria Reale formed the command of the 41st Field Artillery Regiment. The depot also formed the commands of the 3rd, 4th, and 18th heavy field artillery groupings, and the XVI, XX, XXXIII, XXV and CI heavy field howitzer groups. In November 1917 the regiment formed the command of the I Group, as well as the 1st and 2nd batteries with 75/27 mod. 11 field guns, for the formation of the 56th Field Artillery Regiment. After Italy's entry into the war the regiment was deployed on the Asiago plateau, where the Austro-Hungarians surprised the Italians in May 1916 with the Asiago offensive. The regiment fought on Monte Sisemol, Monte Mosciagh, and was then deployed on the Monte Cimone di Tonezza. In 1917 the regiment remained on the Asiago plateau and in 1918 it fought in the Val d'Astico.

In 1926 the regiment was assigned to the 1st Territorial Division of Turin and consisted of a command, one group with 100/17 mod. 14 howitzers, two groups with 75/27 mod. 06 field guns, one group with mule-carried 75/13 mod. 15 mountain guns, and a depot. In February 1931 the III Group with 75/27 mod. 06 field guns was reorganized as a group with mule-carried 75/13 mod. 15 mountain guns. On 11 October 1934 the regiment transferred its I Motorized Group 100/17 mod. 14 howitzers to the 1st Army Corps Artillery Regiment and formed a new I Group, albeit this time with horse-drawn 100/17 mod. 14 howitzers. In January 1935 the 1st Territorial Division of Turin was renamed 1st Infantry Division "Superga" and consequently the regiment was renamed 5th Artillery Regiment "Superga". In 1935–36 the regiment's 7th and 12th batteries, and the 14th Quadruped Infirmary were mobilized for the Second Italo-Ethiopian War.

=== World War II ===
On 10 June 1940, the day Italy entered World War II, the regiment consisted of a command, command unit, one group with 100/17 mod. 14 howitzers, two groups with 75/13 mod. 15 mountain guns, and an anti-aircraft battery with 20/65 mod. 35 anti-aircraft guns. The regiment was assigned to the 1st Infantry Division "Superga", which also included the 91st Infantry Regiment "Superga" and 92nd Infantry Regiment "Superga".

In June 1940 the division participated in the invasion of France. On 21 January 1941 the regiment transferred one of its groups with 75/13 mod. 15 mountain guns to the 59th Artillery Regiment "Cagliari" and received a group with 75/27 mod. 06 field guns in return. On 23 November 1941 the division was ordered to reorganize as an auto-transportable division of the North-African type. On 31 May 1942 the reorganization was complete and the regiment consisted now of a command, command unit, two groups with 75/18 mod. 35 howitzers, and an anti-aircraft battery with 20/65 mod. 35 anti-aircraft guns. The division was one of the units readied in Sicily for the planned invasion of Malta scheduled for summer 1942. After the cancelation of the invasion, the division was sent in November 1942 to Tunisia for the Tunisian campaign. After arriving at Enfidaville Airfield, the division, together with the L Special Brigade, advanced to Sousse-Sfax area. In January 1943 the regiment received the LXV Group with 100/17 mod. 14 howitzers and by 23 January the Italian units were engaged in combat with US Army units. By February 1943 the Italians were forced to fall back towards Tunis, where the division and its regiments surrendered to the British forces on 12 May 1943.

Back in Italy the regiment's depot in Venaria Reale had formed the IV Motorized Group with 100/17 mod. 14 howitzers for the regiment, but after the regiment's surrender the group was transferred to Florence and Pisa and assigned on 1 July 1943 to the 156th Artillery Regiment "Vicenza" of the 156th Infantry Division "Vicenza". After the announcement of the Armistice of Cassibile on 8 September 1943 the IV Group under Major Gian Paolo Gamerra was ordered to move to the port of Livorno and help defend it against invading German forces, but on 9 September the group encountered armored German forces near Stagno and in heavy combat the group was defeated and Major Gamerra killed.

For his sacrifice Gian Paolo Gamerra was awarded Italy's highest military honor, a Gold Medal of Military Valor, while the regiment was awarded for its conduct and sacrifice in the Tunisian campaign a Bronze Medal of Military Valor, which was affixed to the regiment's flag and is depicted on the regiment's coat of arms.

=== Cold War ===
On 1 January 1947 the 5th Field Artillery Regiment was reformed in Albenga. The regiment was assigned to the Infantry Division "Mantova" and consisted of a command, a command unit, and two groups with QF 25-pounder field guns, which had both been ceded by the 155th Field Artillery Regiment. After its formation the regiment moved to Palmanova, where the next year a third group with QF 25-pounder field guns was formed. On 1 January 1951 the Infantry Division "Mantova" included the following artillery regiments:

- Infantry Division "Mantova", in Gorizia
  - 3rd Field Artillery Regiment, in Gradisca d'Isonzo
  - 5th Field Artillery Regiment, in Palmanova
  - 18th Anti-tank Field Artillery Regiment, in Udine
  - 155th Field Artillery Regiment, in Udine
  - 4th Light Anti-aircraft Artillery Regiment, in Cervignano del Friuli

On 1 July 1951 the regiment received the III Light Anti-aircraft Group with 40/56 anti-aircraft autocannons from the 4th Light Anti-aircraft Artillery Regiment and disbanded its own III Group with QF 25-pounder field guns. In July 1952 the regiment's I Group was equipped with M114 155 mm howitzers and in November of the same year the regiment's II Group was equipped with M101 105 mm howitzers. On 1 January 1954 the regiment moved from Palmanova to Udine and on 1 March of the same year the regiment consisted of the following units:

- 5th Field Artillery Regiment, in Udine
  - Command Unit
  - I Group with M101 105 mm howitzers
  - II Group with M101 105 mm howitzers
  - III Group with M101 105 mm howitzers
  - IV Group with M114 155 mm howitzers
  - V Light Anti-aircraft Group with 40/56 anti-aircraft autocannons

On 1 January 1956 the regiment formed a Light Aircraft Section with L-21B artillery observation planes, which in 1957 was expanded to Light Aircraft Unit and was disbanded on 31 December 1962. In 1956 the Infantry Division "Mantova" transferred its Artillery Specialists Unit to the regiment, which expanded the unit in 1958 to Artillery Specialists Battery. On 30 June 1965 the V Light Anti-aircraft Group was placed in reserve status.

During the 1975 army reform the army disbanded the regimental level and newly independent battalions and groups were granted for the first time their own flags. On 20 September 1975 the regiment's I Group was disbanded and on 1 November the IV Group became an autonomous unit, was reorganized and renamed 28th Field Artillery Group "Livorno", and then assigned to the Mechanized Brigade "Isonzo". On 31 December 1975 the 5th Field Artillery Regiment was disbanded and the next day the regiment's II Group was renamed 5th Heavy Self-propelled Field Artillery Group "Superga", while the III Group was renamed 155th Heavy Self-propelled Field Artillery Group "Emilia", and the regiment's Command and Services Battery and the regiment's Specialists Battery formed the Artillery Specialists Group "Mantova". The V Light Anti-aircraft Artillery Group was renamed 12th Light Anti-aircraft Artillery Group "Nibbio" and remained a reserve formation. On the same day the 5th and 155th groups, as well as the artillery specialists group and light anti-aircraft artillery group, were assigned to the Mechanized Division "Mantova"'s Artillery Command, which had been formed with the personnel of the disbanded regiment's command. The 5th Heavy Self-propelled Field Artillery Group "Superga" consisted of a command, a command and services battery, and three batteries with M109G self-propelled howitzers.

On 12 November 1976 the President of the Italian Republic Giovanni Leone assigned with decree 846 the flag and traditions of the 5th Artillery Regiment "Superga" to the group. At the time the group fielded 477 men (38 officers, 62 non-commissioned officers, and 377 soldiers).

For its conduct and work after the 1976 Friuli earthquake the group was awarded a Bronze Medal of Army Valor, which was affixed to the group's flag and added to the group's coat of arms.

On 1 October 1981 the group was equipped with modern FH70 155 mm howitzers and renamed 5th Heavy Field Artillery Group "Superga". In 1986 the Italian Army abolished the divisional level and so on 30 September 1986 the Mechanized Division "Mantova" was disbanded. The next day the group was assigned to the Artillery Command of the 5th Army Corps.

=== Recent times ===
On 1 December 1991 the group was entered the 5th Heavy Field Artillery Regiment, which the group left on 11 September 1992 to enter the next day the reformed 5th Heavy Field Artillery Regiment "Superga". The regiment remained a support unit of 5th Army Corps until 30 November 1997, as the next day the regiment was assigned to the army's Artillery Grouping.

On 30 November 2001 the batteries of the 5th Heavy Field Artillery Regiment "Superga" in Udine were disbanded and the regiment's flag was transferred to Portogruaro, where the next day it supplanted the flag of the 3rd Heavy Artillery Regiment "Volturno", which was transferred to the Shrine of the Flags in the Vittoriano in Rome. The same day the regiment, which was now equipped with M270 MLRS multiple rocket launchers, was designated 5th Field Artillery Regiment "Superga".

== Organization ==
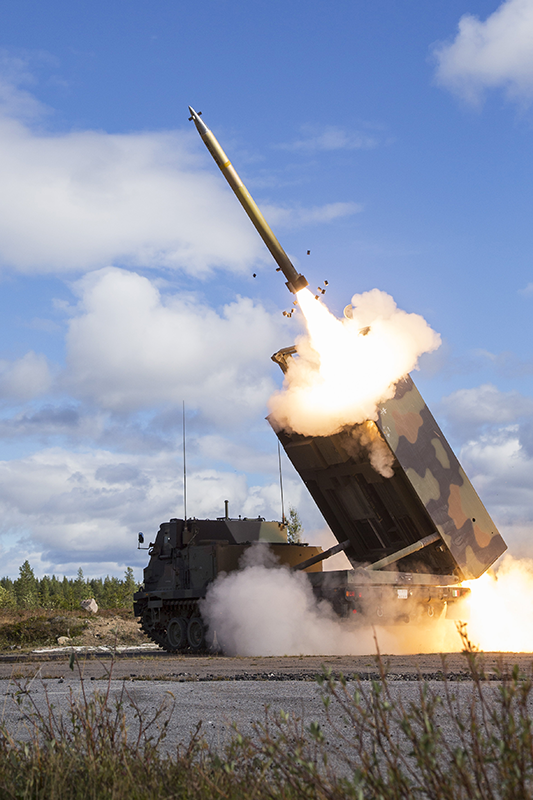
5th Field Artillery Regiment "Superga" M270A1 MLRS-I firing a missile during an exercise in Sweden

As of 2025 the 5th Field Artillery Regiment "Superga" is organized as follows:

- 5th Field Artillery Regiment "Superga", in Portogruaro
  - Command and Logistic Support Battery
  - Missile Launcher Group
    - 1st Missile Launcher Battery
    - 2nd Missile Launcher Battery
    - 3rd Missile Launcher Battery
    - Technical Support Section

Each of the three missile launcher batteries fields two MLRS sections and one Fire and Support Section. Each MLRS section is equipped with three M270A1 MLRS-I multiple rocket launchers. Each Fire and Support Section transports additional missiles on ACP-90 trucks and includes a Close Defense Squad, which is equipped with VTLM Lince vehicles. All of the Italian Army's 21 M270A1 MLRS-I are being upgraded to M270A2.
