= Angelo Policardi =

Italian general (1888–1943)

- Born: 31 October 1888; Vittorio Veneto, Kingdom of Italy
- Died: 1 October 1943 (aged 54); Sinj, Croatia
- Military career
- Allegiance: Kingdom of Italy
- Branch: Royal Italian Army
- Service years: 1907–1943
- Rank: Brigadier General
- Conflicts: World War I; Second Battle of the Piave River; Pacification of Libya; World War II; Italian occupation of Yugoslavia; Operation Achse
- Awards: Silver Medal of Military Valor (posthumous); War Cross for Military Valor; Order of the Crown of Italy; Order of Saints Maurice and Lazarus; Colonial Order of the Star of Italy

Angelo Giovanni Maria Policardi (31 October 1888 – 1 October 1943) was an Italian general during World War II.

== Biography ==
He was born in Ceneda, a district of Vittorio Veneto, on October 31, 1888, into a noble family. After obtaining the classical high school diploma in 1907, he entered the Royal Military Academy of Artillery and Engineers in Turin and graduated in 1910 with the rank of second lieutenant in the Engineering Corps of the Royal Italian Army. He was later promoted to lieutenant and then to captain, and in 1915 he married Miss Domenica Novelli. During the First World War he commanded the 20th Sapper Company, fighting in the Second Battle of the Piave River, and in 1919 he was awarded the Knight's Cross of the Order of the Crown of Italy and transferred to the military engineering directorate of Verona.

In 1926 he became lieutenant colonel, and between 1928 and 1932 he worked in Libya, attached to the Royal Corps of Colonial Troops of Cyrenaica. In 1935 he was appointed Knight of the Order of Saints Maurice and Lazarus due to his long service and in the same year he was recalled into temporary service, assigned to the command of the engineers of the Naples Army Corps. After promotion to colonel on January 1, 1937, with seniority on June 28, 1933, he was placed on leave to reduce cadres and assigned to the command of the military area of Turin. In December 1941 he was recalled into service, promoted to brigadier general and assigned to the territorial defense command of Trieste. On 29 January 1942 he was appointed commander of the Engineers of the XVIII Army Corps, with headquarters in Split, where he took up service on 18 March 1942.

At the proclamation of the Armistice of Cassibile, on 8 September 1943, Policardi was in Split, then garrisoned by the 15th Infantry Division Bergamo, under the command of General Emilio Becuzzi. The latter, the highest ranking officer in the area, initially decided to resist the Germans by joining forces with the Yugoslav partisans, but at the same time informed them he would not fight against the former allies. On 11 September Becuzzi held a war council with his officers, suggesting to hand over all weapons to the Yugoslav partisans, abstain from fighting the Germans, and dissolve all Italian units in the area. Generals Alfonso Cigala Fulgosi, commander of the Split Fortress Area, and Salvatore Pelligra, artillery commander of the XVIII Corps, firmly refused to give up their arms, expressing their desire to fight the Germans. The High Command was asked for reinforcements, but instead it sent ships to pick up some 3,000 soldiers on 23 September. General Becuzzi left with them, leaving Pelligra in command; Policardi, despite being ill, and Cigala Fulgosi also remained behind. On the following day the 7th SS Volunteer Mountain Division Prinz Eugen, supported by some squadrons of Junkers Ju 87 dive bombers, captured Split. Obergruppenführer Karl Reichsritter von Oberkamp, commander of the "Prinz Eugen" Division, ordered that all Italian officers who had made common cause with the Yugoslav partisans were to be executed.

Policardi was sentenced to death by a drumhead court-martial presided by Ritter von Oberkamp, and executed by firing squad near Sinj on 1 October 1943, along with Pelligra and Cigala Fulgosi. On the following day, another forty-six officers (five colonels, one lieutenant colonel, two majors, twenty-three captains, ten lieutenants and five second lieutenants) were shot near Trilj. Policardi was posthumously awarded the Silver Medal of Military Valor.
