= 1st Heavy Field Artillery Regiment (Italy) =

Italian Army artillery unit

- 1° Reggimento Artiglieria Pesante Campale
- Active: 1 April 1912 — 8 Sept. 1943
- Country: Kingdom of Italy
- Branch: Royal Italian Army
- Garrison/HQ: Casale Monferrato
- Motto: "Graviter in hostem ignem conicimus"
- Anniversaries: 15 June 1918 - Second Battle of the Piave River

Insignia
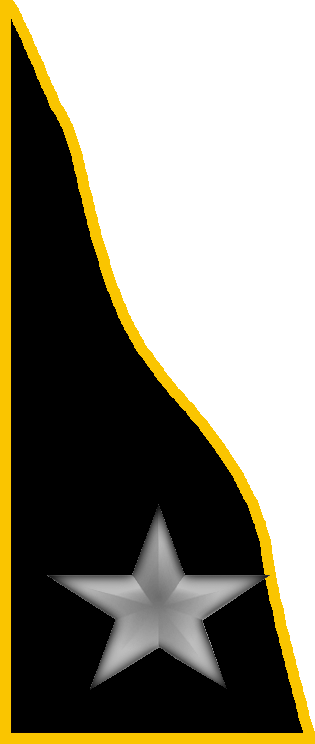
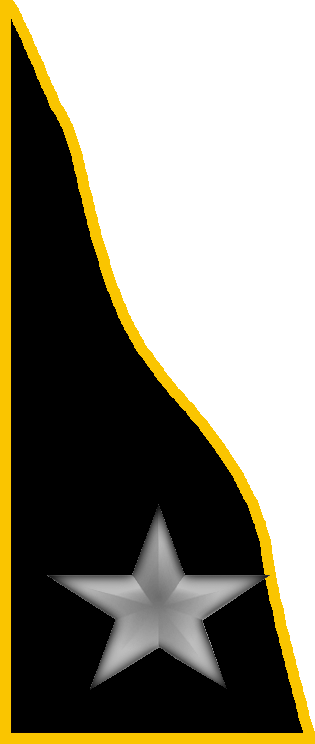
- Regimental gorget patches

The 1st Heavy Field Artillery Regiment (Italian: 1° Reggimento Artiglieria Pesante Campale) is an inactive artillery regiment of the Italian Army, which was based in Casale Monferrato in Piedmont and assigned to the I Army Corps. In 1912, the Royal Italian Army formed two heavy field artillery regiments, among them the 1st Heavy Field Artillery Regiment in Casale Monferrato. At the outbreak of World War I the regiment consisted of six groups with a combined 14 batteries. During the war the regiment acted as training unit and mobilized three artillery grouping commands, 18 cannon group commands, two howitzer group commands, and 61 batteries of various types for the aforementioned group commands. The regiment's groups served on the Italian front. During World War II the regiment formed the commands of two army corps artillery groupings, one of which fought in the Western Desert Campaign and Tunisian Campaign, during which the grouping was destroyed. The regiment and its remaining grouping were disbanded by invading German forces after the announcement of the Armistice of Cassibile on 8 September 1943.

The regimental anniversary falls, as for all Italian Army artillery regiments, on June 15, 1918, the beginning of the Second Battle of the Piave River. This article is about the Royal Italian Army's 1st Heavy Field Artillery Regiment, which was a support unit assigned to a corps-level command. This regiment is unrelated to the 1st Heavy Artillery Regiment, which was a support unit assigned to an army-level command, and unrelated to the 1st Field Artillery Regiment, which was a support unit assigned to a division-level command.

== History ==
=== Formation ===
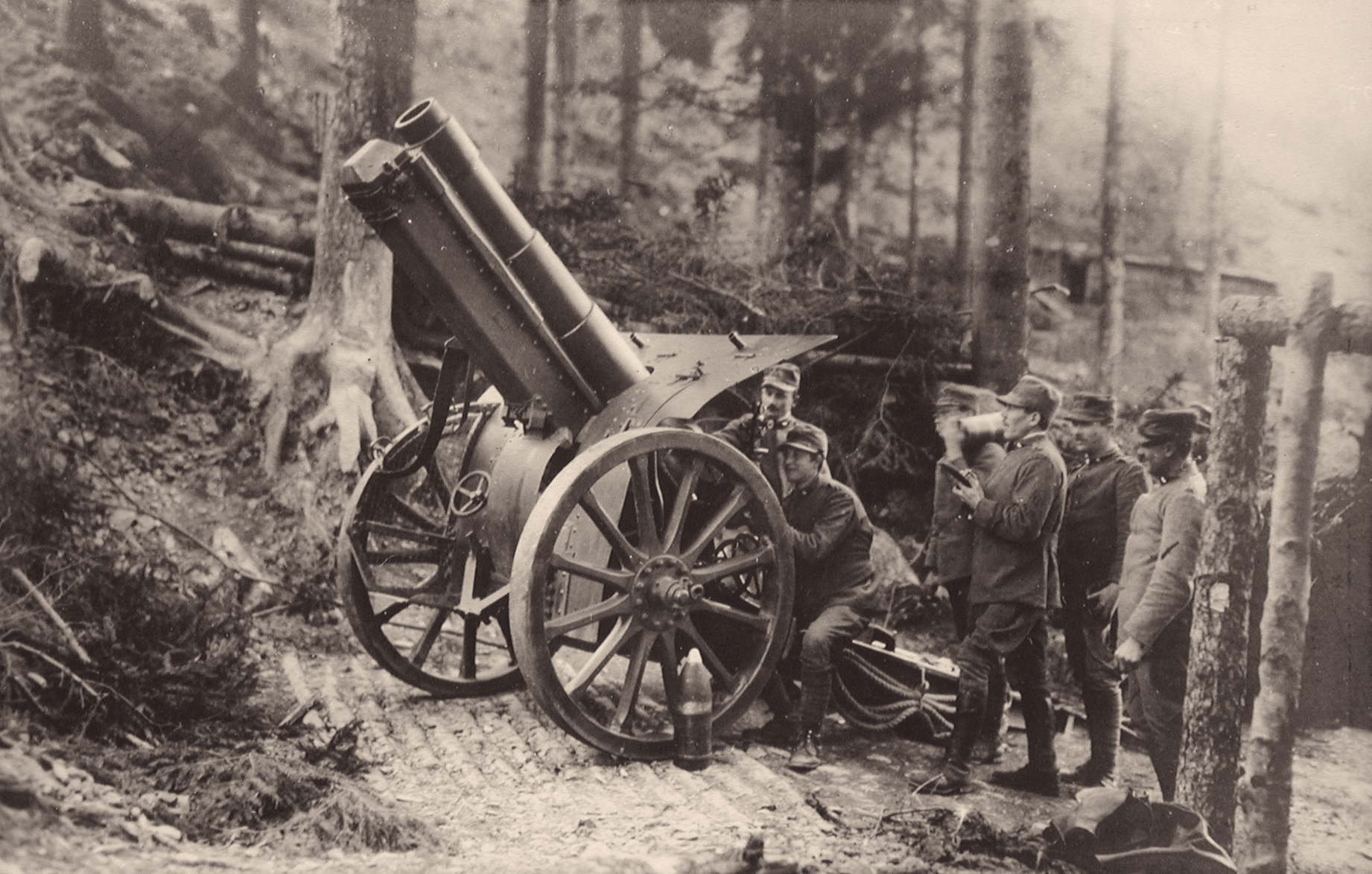
A 149/12 mod. 14 howitzer during the Third Battle of the Isonzo

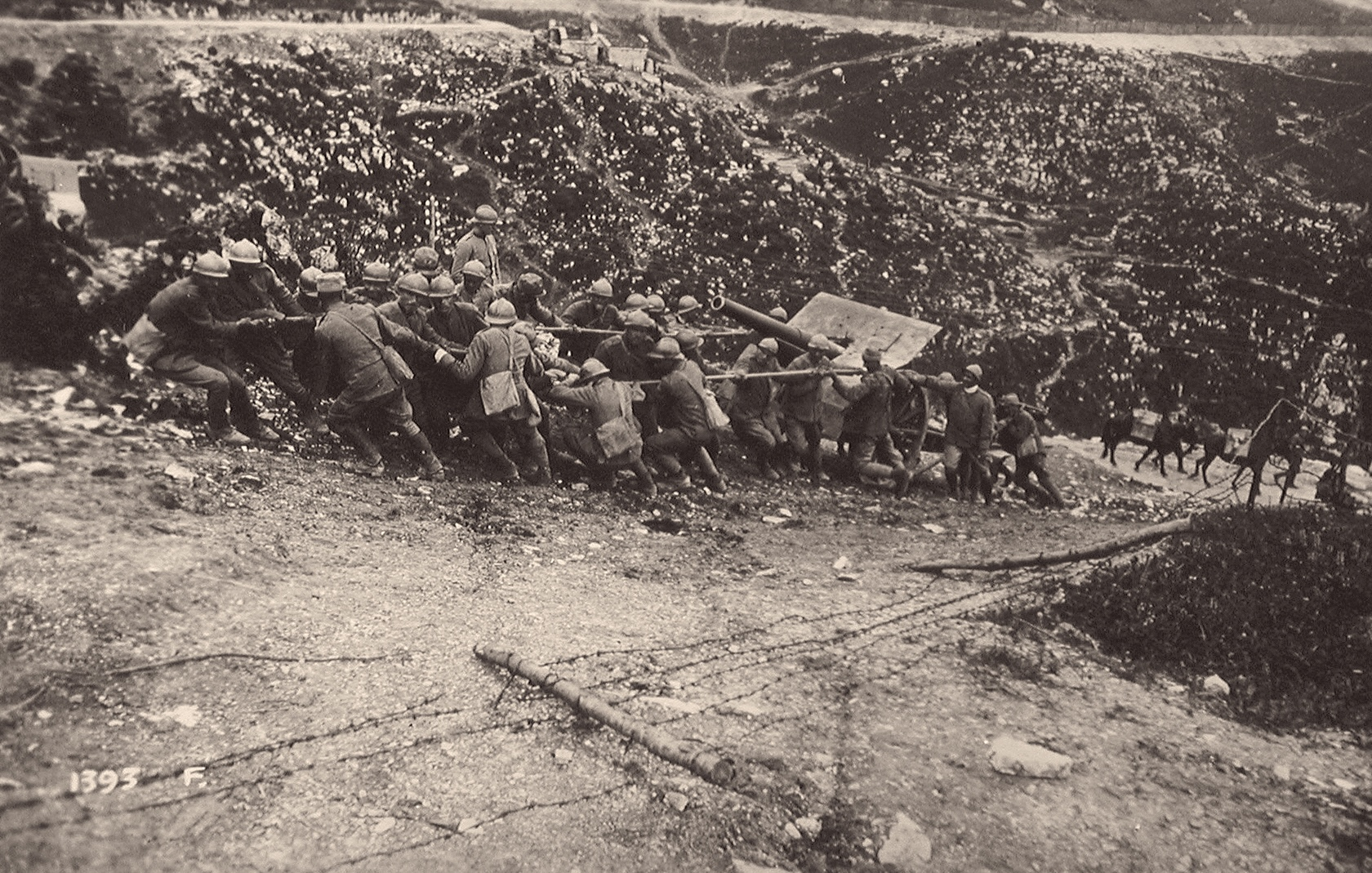
A 105/28 cannon is moved into position

In 1910, the Royal Italian Army decided to form a new artillery speciality, which would be equipped with heavier howitzers than the field artillery's 75/27 mod. 06 field guns and with more mobile howitzers than the fortress artillery's siege mortars and siege howitzers. In 1911, the army ordered 112 15 cm sFH 13 heavy field howitzers from the German arms manufacturer Krupp and acquired a license to produce the gun in Italy. In March 1912, Krupp delivered last of the 112 ordered howitzers and, on 1 April 1912, the Royal Italian Army formed two heavy field artillery regiments: the 1st Heavy Field Artillery Regiment in Casale Monferrato and the 2nd Heavy Field Artillery Regiment in Modena. Both regiments consisted of a command, a depot, the I Howitzers Group, and the II Howitzers Group. Each group fielded two batteries, with four 15 cm sFH 13 howitzers per battery. Upon entering Italian service the howitzers received the designation 149/12 heavy field howitzer.

The personnel for the 1st Heavy Field Artillery Regiment's command, two groups, and depot was drawn from the 5th Field Artillery Regiment, 17th Field Artillery Regiment and 23rd Field Artillery Regiment, while the army's 149/12 howitzers training battery at San Maurizio Canavese was divided between the two regiments. On 1 November 1912, both regiments added the III Howitzers Group with three batteries and two years later, on 15 November 1914, both regiments added the IV Howitzers Group with three batteries. Between 5 and 20 January 1915, both regiments added the V and VI groups with two batteries per group. Afterwards each regiment fielded six groups with a combined 14 batteries and 56 howitzers.

=== World War I ===
On 24 May 1915, the day Italy entered World War I, the regiment's six groups were assigned to the following units:

- I Group (1st, 2nd, and 3rd Battery) — 11th Division, VI Army Corps
- II Group (4th and 5th Battery) — III Army Corps
- III Group (6th and 7th Battery) — 1st Army
- IV Group (8th, 9th, and 10th Battery) — IV Army Corps
- V Group (11th and 12th Battery) — 7th Division, IV Army Corps
- VI Group (13th and 14th Battery) — II Army Corps

During the war the 1st Heavy Field Artillery Regiment acted as a training unit, while its groups fought as autonomous units on the Italian front. As the production of 149/12 mod. 14 howitzers turned out to be difficult and slow, the army decided to from cannon groups equipped with towed 105/28 cannons, respectively cannon groups equipped with 102/35 mod. 14 naval guns mounted on SPA 9000 trucks instead. In March 1916, the depots of field artillery regiments began with the formation of the first two howitzer groups equipped with 149/12 mod. 14 howitzers produced in Italy by Vickers-Terni and Ansaldo. However, due to the complexity of the Krupp gun carriage and the need to replace more than 40 damaged gun carriages of units at the front, the 149/12 mod. 14 howitzers were delivered with a siege carriage, that lacked the desired mobility. In April 1916, the 2nd Heavy Field Artillery Regiment's six groups were renumbered as VII to XII group and the regiment's batteries were similarly renumbered as 15th to 28th battery. Subsequently, the 2nd Heavy Field Artillery Regiment formed two new howitzer groups, which were numbered XIII and XIV, while the next two groups formed by the regiment in May 1916 were numbered XV and XVI. Afterwards the two heavy field artillery regiment's 16 howitzer groups fielded 40 batteries with a total of 160 149/12 howitzers. During the year 1916, the heavy field artillery's number of groups equipped with cannons grew to 20 cannon groups: 14 of which fielded 42 batteries with 105/28 cannons, while the remaining six groups fielded 16 batteries with 102/35 mod. 14 naval guns on SPA 9000 trucks.

By summer 1916, Ansaldo began production of a simpler gun carriage for the 149/12 howitzer. This new variant was designated 149/12 mod. 16. Consequently, the Italian War Ministry's Undersecretary for Arms and Ammunition ordered an additional 92 149/12 mod. 14 and 149/12 mod. 16 batteries, 84 of which would be assigned to 28 newly formed howitzer groups, while the remaining eight batteries would be used to bring the two heavy field artillery regiment's eight groups, which fielded just two batteries, to full strength. At the same time, the army decided to renumber the howitzer groups: groups equipped with German made 149/12 howitzers and 149/12 mod. 14 howitzers, would be numbered I to XXII, while the groups equipped with 149/12 mod. 16 would be numbered XXIII to XLIV. Likewise 149/12 and 149/12 mod. 14 batteries would be numbered 1st to 66th, while 149/12 mod. 16 batteries would be numbered 67th to 132nd. As the four groups formed in spring 1916 (XIII, XIV, XV, and XVI) were scheduled to replace the siege carriages of their 149/12 mod. 14 howitzers with the new Ansaldo gun carriage, they were renumbered as XXIII, XXIV, XXV, and XXVI groups.

Between November 1916 and February 1917, Vickers-Terni delivered enough 149/12 mod. 14 howitzers to form 18 batteries (37th to 54th), with which six new groups were formed (XIII to XVIII). In the same timeframe Ansaldo delivered enough 149/12 mod. 16 howitzers to form 24 batteries (79th to 102nd), with which eight new groups were formed (XXVII to XXXIV). Most of these howitzer groups were formed by the depots of field artillery regiments, while the two heavy field artillery regiments focused on forming cannon groups: the 1st Heavy Field Artillery Regiment's depot formed only the command of the XLV and XLVII howitzer groups and four batteries with 149/12 mod. 16 howitzers. By the end of 1916, the number of cannon groups equipped with 105/28 cannons reached 22 groups with 66 batteries, while the number of groups with 102/35 mod. 14 naval guns on SPA 9000 trucks was capped at six. To command the heavy field artillery's groups at the front, the 1st Heavy Field Artillery Regiment, together with the 2nd Heavy Field Artillery Regiment and various field artillery regiments, formed the commands of 25 heavy field artillery groupings. Specifically, over the course of the war, the 1st Heavy Field Artillery Regiment's depot in Casale Monferrato formed the commands of the 11th, 16th, and 21st heavy field artillery groupings. Of the various cannon groups, the regiment's depot formed the commands of the I, II, V, VIII, XI, XIII, XVI, XVIII, XXI, XXIII, XXV, XXVII XXXI, XXXII, XXXV, XXXVI, XXXVII, and XXXVIII cannon groups, as well as 55 cannon batteries for these groups. The regiment's depot also formed two siege batteries for the army's heavy artillery.

In November 1917, after the Italian 2nd Army had been defeated in the Battle of Caporetto, the remnants of the 2nd Army, as well as the Italian 3rd Army retreated to the Piave river. In the battle and the following retreat the Italian artillery lost 3,152 artillery pieces — 44,6% of all available guns. The heavy field artillery lost entire groups to the advancing Austro-Hungarian and Imperial German armies. Over the course of the next months the heavy field artillery was rebuilt. In June 1918, the Austro-Hungarian forces attempted to cross the Piave river in the Second Battle of the Piave River. During the battle the 1st Heavy Field Artillery Regiment's groups fought on the Montello hill, on Monte Grappa, and along the Piave river.

=== Interwar years ===
After the end of the war the Royal Italian Army began the process of downsizing its heavy field artillery. However, in November 1919, the army decided to assign a heavy field artillery regiment to each of its 14 army corps. Consequently, in summer 1920, the army formed an additional twelve heavy field artillery regiments, each of which consisted of two cannon groups and two howitzer groups. As part of this reorganization, the 1st Heavy Field Artillery Regiment was assigned the X Cannons Group and XII Cannons Group, which had been formed during the war by the depot of the 2nd Heavy Field Artillery Regiment. Upon entering the 1st Heavy Field Artillery Regiment, the two cannon groups were redesignated I and II cannon groups with 105/28 cannons. The 1st Heavy Field Artillery Regiment also retained its I Howitzers Group and XLVII Howitzers Group, which were redesignated III and IV howitzers groups with 149/12 howitzers. The regiment was assigned to the I Army Corps in Turin.

On 14 February 1928, the regiment received an auto-carried artillery group from the Horse Artillery Regiment. On 15 September 1931, the regiment ceded the Auto-carried Artillery Group to help form the Light Artillery Regiment. On 1 October 1934, all heavy field artillery regiments were renamed army corps artillery regiment. Consequently, the 1st Heavy Field Artillery Regiment was renamed 1st Army Corps Artillery Regiment (Italian: 1° Reggimento Artiglieria di Corpo d'Armata). On 11 October of the same year, the regiment received a motorized group with 100/17 mod. 14 howitzers from the 5th Field Artillery Regiment. On 5 September 1935, the regiment ceded the Motorized Group to help reform the 46th Field Artillery Regiment. During the same year, the regiment's depot formed the command of a positional artillery grouping, and a positional group with two batteries for the Second Italo-Ethiopian War. In October 1936, the regiment added the V Light Group with 100/17 mod. 14 howitzers.

=== World War II ===
On 3 September 1939, two days after the start of World War II, the regiment was reorganized and consisted afterwards of the I, II, and XXIV cannon groups with 105/28 cannons, V Group with 100/17 mod. 14 howitzers, and CI and CII howitzer groups with 149/13 heavy howitzers. On 1 December 1939, the regiment formed the 1st Army Corps Specialists Unit. On 31 December 1940, the regiment transferred its V Group with 100/17 mod. 14 howitzers to the 2nd Fast Artillery Regiment "Emanuele Filiberto Testa di Ferro", which deployed to Libya for the Western Desert Campaign. During the war the regiment's depot in Casale Monferrato formed and mobilized the following commands and units:

- Command of the 1st Army Corps Artillery Grouping, which during operations represented the regiment
- Command of the 24th Army Corps Artillery Grouping
- XLI Cannons Group with 105/28 cannons
- XXIV Howitzers Group with 149/28 heavy field howitzers
- CXLI Howitzers Group with 149/13 heavy howitzers
- CLXI Self-propelled Group with 90/53 heavy self-propelled guns
- XII Replacements Group for 105/28 cannons

The groups operated either under command of army corps artillery groupings or as autonomous units. In the evening of 8 September 1943, the Armistice of Cassibile, which ended hostilities between the Kingdom of Italy and the Anglo-American Allies, was announced by General Dwight D. Eisenhower on Radio Algiers and by Marshal Pietro Badoglio on Italian radio. Germany reacted by invading Italy and the 1st Army Corps Artillery Regiment and its depot were disbanded soon thereafter by German forces.

- 1st Army Corps Artillery Grouping: the grouping was mobilized on 10 June 1940 and consisted of a command, a command unit, the I and II cannons groups with 105/28 cannons, CI and CII howitzer groups with 149/13 heavy howitzers, and the 1st Army Corps Specialists Unit. In this configuration the grouping participated in June 1940 in the Italian invasion of France. Afterwards the grouping returned to its base in Casale Monferrato and repeatedly changed its composition. In November 1942, the grouping participated in the Axis occupation of Vichy France. Afterwards the grouping took up garrison duties in occupied France. In the first days of September 1943, the grouping was recalled to Italy, where it was disbanded by German forces shortly after the announcement of the Armistice of Cassibile.
- 24th Army Corps Artillery Grouping: the grouping was formed on 30 December 1940 and consisted of a command, a command unit, the I and II cannon groups with 105/28 cannons and a group with 100/17 mod. 14 howitzers. On 19 February 1941, the grouping left Italy for Tripoli in Libya. The grouping fought in all the battles of the Western Desert Campaign. After the Axis defeat in the Second Battle of El Alamein, the grouping retreated with the remnants of the German-Italian Panzer Army Africa to Tunisia, where the grouping was assigned to the Italian XXI Army Corps. The grouping then fought in the Tunisian Campaign. On 15 March 1943, the grouping consisted of two groups with 105/28 cannons and one group with German 8.8 anti-aircraft guns. The grouping was heavily attrited in the Battle of Enfidaville and consisted afterwards of just eight guns. On 13 May 1943, the German-Italian Panzer Group Afrika surrendered to the Anglo-American forces and the 24th Army Corps Artillery Grouping ceased to exist.
