= Salvatore Pelligra =

Italian general (1891–1943)

- Born: 22 May 1891; Comiso, Kingdom of Italy
- Died: 1 October 1943 (aged 52); Sinj, Croatia
- Military career
- Allegiance: Kingdom of Italy
- Branch: Royal Italian Army
- Service years: 1912–1943
- Rank: Brigadier General
- Commands: Central Artillery School
- Conflicts: World War I; Second Battle of the Piave River; World War II; Operation Achse
- Awards: Gold Medal of Military Valor (posthumous); War Cross for Military Valor; Order of the Crown of Italy

Salvatore Pelligra (22 May 1891 – 1 October 1943) was an Italian general during World War II. He was brother of General Raffaele Pelligra, who commanded the Guardia di Finanza from 1947 to 1953.

== Biography ==
He was born in Comiso, province of Ragusa, on 22 May 1891, and attended the Royal Military Academy of Artillery and Engineers of Turin, graduating in 1912 with the rank of artillery second lieutenant. He participated in the First World War, during which he was promoted to the rank of captain, distinguishing himself during his service with the 3rd Field Artillery Regiment, and earning a War Cross for Military Valor during the fighting on the Montello during the Second Battle of the Piave River. On 1 July 1937 he was promoted to the rank of colonel.

In 1940 he was Commander of the Central Artillery School of Civitavecchia. On 1 January 1942 he was promoted to brigadier general, and on 21 February of the same year he was appointed commander of the artillery of General Umberto Spigo's XVIII Army Corps, stationed in Dalmatia.

At the proclamation of the Armistice of Cassibile, on 8 September 1943, Pelligra was in Split, then garrisoned by the 15th Infantry Division Bergamo, under the command of General Emilio Becuzzi, senior to him and the highest ranking officer in the area. Becuzzi initially decided to resist the Germans by joining forces with the Yugoslav partisans, but at the same time informed them he would not fight against the former allies. On 11 September Becuzzi held a war council with his officers, suggesting to hand over all weapons to the Yugoslav partisans, abstain from fighting the Germans, and dissolve all Italian units in the area. Both Pelligra and General Alfonso Cigala Fulgosi, commander of the Split Fortress Area, firmly refused to give up their arms, expressing their desire to fight the Germans. The High Command was asked for reinforcements, but instead it sent ships to pick up some 3,000 soldiers on 23 September. General Becuzzi left with them, leaving Pelligra, who had refused to leave as long as any of his soldiers were stranded in Split, in command. On the following day the 7th SS Volunteer Mountain Division Prinz Eugen, supported by some squadrons of Junkers Ju 87 dive bombers, captured Split. Obergruppenführer Karl Reichsritter von Oberkamp, commander of the "Prinz Eugen" Division, ordered that all Italian officers who had made common cause with the Yugoslav partisans were to be executed.

Pelligra was sentenced to death by a drumhead court-martial presided by Ritter von Oberkamp, and executed by firing squad near Sinj on 1 October 1943, along with General Cigala Fulgosi and Brigadier General Angelo Policardi, commander of the Engineers of the XVIII Army Corps. On the following day, another forty-six officers (five colonels, one lieutenant colonel, two majors, twenty-three captains, ten lieutenants and five second lieutenants) were shot near Trilj. Pelligra was posthumously awarded the Gold Medal of Military Valor.
