= Gian Paolo Gamerra =

Italian officer (1907–1943)

- Born: 2 July 1907; Turin, Kingdom of Italy
- Died: 9 September 1943 (aged 36); Stagno, Kingdom of Italy
- Military career
- Allegiance: Kingdom of Italy
- Branch: Royal Italian Army
- Rank: Major
- Commands: Fourth 100/17 TM Artillery Group
- Conflicts: World War II; Battle of the Western Alps; Greco-Italian War; Operation Achse
- Awards: Gold Medal of Military Valor (posthumous); War Cross for Military Valor

Gian Paolo Gamerra (2 July 1907 – 9 September 1943) was an Italian officer during World War II, posthumously awarded the Gold Medal of Military Valor.

== Biography ==
He was born in Turin in 1907, the son of Emilio Gamerra and Enrichetta Guibert. He took part in the Second World War within the 5th Artillery Regiment "Superga", fighting in the brief campaign against France in June 1940 (being awarded a War Cross for Military Valor for his behaviour during the fighting in the upper Frejus valley) and in the Greco-Italian War in 1940–1941. At the proclamation of the Armistice of Cassibile on 8 September 1943 he held the rank of Major and the command of the Fourth 100/17 TM Artillery Group, part of the 176th Artillery Regiment "Vicenza", stationed near Pisa since early September.

The news of the proclamation of the armistice was learned by the command of the Pisa Military Zone on the radio at around 10 pm on September 8, and at 8 am on September 9 its commander, General Umberto Ferreri, ordered Gamerra to deploy his artillery group near Stagno, ready for combat, positioning it in such a way as to be able to shell the port of Livorno and at the same time support the coastal batteries that in the night had been suddenly attacked by strong German contingents. During the march from Pisa to Stagno, Gamerra's column was halted by a German detachment, supported by several tanks, whose commander demanded the surrender of all heavy weapons and vehicles. Gamerra refused, and fire was opened on both sides; Gamerra incited his men to fight and took the place of a machine gunner who had been killed, firing on the attackers until he was himself mortally wounded. Captain Alfieri Roussel, who had replaced him, was likewise killed along with eight more men, while forty more were wounded. This action however delayed the German advance long enough for the personnel of the coastal batteries to disengage and avoid being encircled. Gamerra was posthumously awarded the Gold Medal of Military Valor, and his wife, Anna Maria Menicati, later joined the Resistance.
