= Artillery School (Italy) =

- Scuola d'Artiglieria
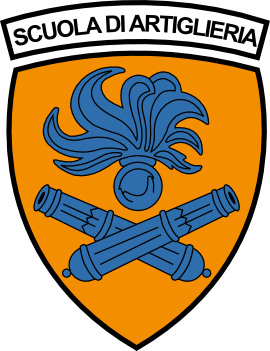
- Sleeve patch of the Artillery School
- Active: 1 July 1888 – 1944; 27 January 1945 – 30 September 2010
- Country: Italy
- Branch: Royal Italian Arm (1888-1944); Italian Army (1945-2010)
- Type: Field artillery
- Role: Training institution
- Motto: Latin: Studio ignique usque ad gloriam
- Anniversaries: 15 June 1918

Commanders
- Notable commanders: Umberto Utili

The Artillery School (Italian: Scuola d'Artiglieria) was the training establishment of the Arm of Artillery of the Italian Army.

The Artillery School, dissolved as an independent body on 30 September 2010, could trace its origins back to 1888, through numerous reorganization phases.

== History ==
Training establishments related to artillery date back to the XVIII Century, when King Charles Emmanuel III of Sardinia established the Royal School of Artillery and Fortification. In 1821, it was merged with the existing Royal Military Academy and assumed the name of Application School of Artillery and Engineering.

=== Central School of Artillery Shooting: 1888-1915 ===
The traditions of the School of Artillery draw their origins from the "Central School of Artillery Shooting" (Scuola Centrale di Tiro di Artiglieria), established on 1 July 1888 (Royal Decree No. 131 of 24 June 1888) in Nettuno. The School was established in order to give adequate impetus to the professional education of cadres and to give artillery training a unitary direction, supported by application standards corresponding to the performance of weapons. In 1894, at the Bracciano shooting range, the first training course on firing with fortress and siege artillery was held for Fortress Artillery Officers.

Following the 1910 Spingardi Reform, on 9 August 1910, the School split, giving rise to two distinct Schools, the Central School of Field Artillery (including mountain artillery and horse artillery) which remained in Nettuno, and the Central Fortress Artillery School, which was established in Rome with a shooting range in Bracciano.

During the First World War the two schools lost their didactic function. In Bracciano a Training Group was established for the preparation of personnel for the specialist units. In Nettuno a special "Experimental Section" was established at the Central School of Artillery with experimental and testing tasks in order to rapidly upgrade and modernize the artilleries. On the other hand, personnel training took place in the depots located behind the front. Among them, should be remembered that of Spilimbergo, which assumed the name of Shooting School.

=== Interwar period ===
In 1920, the two schools merged into the Central Artillery School in Bracciano, in the reorganization process which concentrated the combat schools in that area. In 1925 the Artillery Central School was transferred in Civitavecchia, directly under the Army General Staff.

In 1921, the Experimental Section in Nettuno, which had been considerably strengthened during the conflict, became autonomous, first establishing itself in the Directorate of Artillery Experiences and, subsequently, in 1927, in the Artillery Experience Centre.

Month-long courses were held mainly for Officers who were preparing to take up the posts of group or regimental commander. The courses were organized according to a tripartite scheme:

- a first period, common, necessary to give a panoramic and general vision of the use of the units of the various branches according to the dictates of the current doctrine;
- a second period, at the respective branch school, in which Officers deepened the study of the characteristics and technique of the weapon they belong to;
- a third period, again in common, which ensured, through practical exercises and maneuvers with cadres, the acquisition of operational concepts concerning joint cooperation.

The School did not have its own Units. For the exercises it had the regiments of the 52nd Infantry Division "Torino", also based in Civitavecchia, and permanently received in aggregation from other bodies the Groups or Batteries of the non-divisional artillery specialties.

In 1927 the Artillery Shooting School, aimed to troops and enlisted personnel, was reestablished and reactivated in Nettuno. The Artillery Shooting School was directly under the Inspector of Artillery.

=== Second World War ===
During the Second World War the activity of the Shooting School of Neptune had a notable increase, above all to retrain the ranks of reservists called to arms who had to constitute or complete the Artillery units.

In 1944 the Central School of Artillery was hit by the allied landing which destroyed the Artillery Experience Center. At the end of the war, the Experience Center remained in Nettuno and was strengthened, also incorporating the Infantry Experience Center of Santa Severa as the 5th Experience Section.

=== After Second World War: 1946–1990 ===
After the Second World War, the reconstruction was not long in coming. On 27 January 1945, the 152nd Artillery Regiment "Piceno" moved to Bracciano assuming the following organic constitution:

- Command;
- School and Artillery Complements Group;
- School and Engineer Complements Battalion;
- Mixed complements battalion.

On 10 April 1945, the 152nd Artillery Regiment "Piceno" was renamed "Artillery Training Regiment". On 15 January 1946, the Artillery Training Regiment was renamed Artillery School. Definitively returned to Bracciano, the School was unified into a single institute and placed under the Military Central Schools Command. In 1946 the School of Mechanics of Artillery Workers of Civitavecchia passed under the control of the School of Artillery of Bracciano, of which it became a detachment.

Chief of Army Staff Luigi Efisio Marras in 1947 strengthened the Officers Schools: the Schools of Arms Cooperation (Scuola Cooperazione Varie Armi, S.CO.V.A.), grouping the Schools in Civitavecchia, was established in the same year. On 25 October, the Artillery School was granted the task of keeping the War Flag of the Arm of Artillery.

In 1948, with the establishment of the 1st Battery of reserve officers cadets, the Artillery School also assumed the nature of a training institute for reserve cadres, while it lost the Anti-aircraft detachments of Bracciano, Sabaudia and Civitavecchia. In 1949 the XI Field Artillery Group was moved to the then-V Territorial Military Command in Padua.

In 1951, the Artillery School gave birth to a new specialty with the establishment of an Artillery Light Aviation Unit, which was later renamed Army Light Aviation Unit; in 1958 the Army Light Aviation Unit was transferred to Viterbo, thus giving rise to the Army Aviation.

In 1954, the Reserve Officers and Sub-officers School was established in Foligno, with the exception of the self-propelled speciality and the Artillery specialists who kept their headquarters in Bracciano, both under the VIII Territorial Military Command of Rome.

In 1956 the artillery training sector was reorganized. The command of all the Artillery Schools was entrusted to a General, who was supported by:

- a Colonel, Deputy Commander;
- a Colonel, Course Director
- a Colonel, commander of the Reserve Officers and Sub-officers School in Foligno.

The Deputy Commander oversaw the entire logistical and administrative organization of the School and also performed the functions of Corps Commander in relation to the demonstration Units. The Colonel, Course Director, on the other hand, presided over the didactic organization, making use of the activities of some "units". In 1956, a "Technical Application Course" was launched for the training of Artillery Officers.

In 1964, the School was again reorganized. The Commanding General, in turn dependent on the Inspector of the Arm of Artillery, had under its dependencies a Chief of Staff as coordinator of the activity, both disciplinary and logistic, of the whole school complex. The actual training part was carried out within four "Courses Units":

- The first Courses Unit provided for the organization and development of the courses the Captains to be promoted.
- The second Courses Unit provided for the development of courses for reserve officers and Sub-officers and for student team leaders of the missile and self-propelled specialties.
- The third Courses Unit included all the operational units of the School as well as the Light Aircraft Section and some batteries for non-divisional specialties. In addition to the personnel training, it also provided units and means for the training for those attending the Courses, for carrying out demonstration, cooperation and experience exercises; moreover, it organized the Technical-Application Course and refresher courses for the personnel of all ranks recalled from leave.
- The fourth Courses Unit, located in Civitavecchia, also included a demonstration specialist Battery and took care of the training at all levels of the personnel assigned to the specialist unit.

=== 1975 Army reform ===
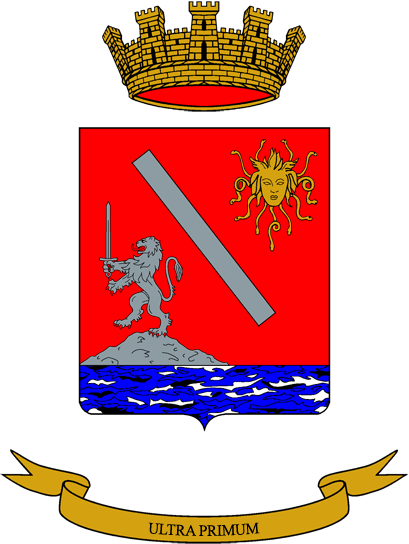
Coat of arms of the 1st Self-Propelled Field Artillery Group "Cacciatori delle Alpi".

In January 1976 the Army established two Artillery Groups, operational and demonstrative pawns of the School: the 1st Self-Propelled Field Artillery Group "Cacciatori delle Alpi", formed from the 8th Army Corps Self-propelled Field Artillery Group, and the 18th Field Artillery Group "Gran Sasso" formed from the 1st Group of the 13th Artillery Regiment. On 2 May 1976 the 1st Group inherited the War Flag, the Red Tie and the Garibaldi traditions of the 1st Artillery Regiment.

These two Artillery Groups were joined by an A.U.C. Group, which took care of the training and training of the Reserve Officer Cadets and the Subfofficers of the self-propelled specialities, the Specialists Group and a Support Unit.

In June 1981, with the dissolution of the School of Artillery Officers and Subfofficers in Foligno which took care of the training of the students of mechanical towing specialities, the 18th Group was suppressed and transformed into the Mechanical Towing A.U.C. Group, while the 1st Artillery Group lost the "Self-propelled" designation and became the demonstrative group of the School. All activities were thus concentrated in Bracciano. On 15 June 1986, the War Flag drape was replaced.

=== After the Cold War ===
Subsequent reorganizations led to the dissolution of the Specialists Group and of the Support Unit. The latter one was later reconstituted once the two A.U.C. Groups were merged into a single training institution. From 1 October 1997 to September 2009, the School Commander carried out the command activity on the Training and Experimentation Centre for the Anti-Aircraft Artillery of Sabaudia. The Commander also assumed the position of Deputy Inspector of the Arm of Artillery on the same date.

On 12 November 1999, the 1st Artillery Group "Cacciatori delle Alpi" was disestablished and its flag returned to the Shrine of the Flags at the Altare della Patria in Rome. The Artillery School was reorganized into a Training Group and a Support Group.

On 1 February 2006 a new organization was introduced. The General Staff was reorganised and the Training Regiment was established on 1 March 2006; at the same time, the Logistics Support Group and the Training Group were dissolved. The establishment of the Training Regiment was decided in order to optimize the performance of the institutional tasks of the School of Artillery and to develop the training activity. On 30 September 2010 the School was disestablished and merged into the present-day Artillery Command.

=== Artillery Command ===
The Artillery Command was established on 1 October 2010 in Bracciano on the basis of the Artillery School. The Artillery Command was the result of the merger of the Inspectorate of the Arm of Artillery, of the Artillery Brigade and of the Artillery School.

== List of commanders ==
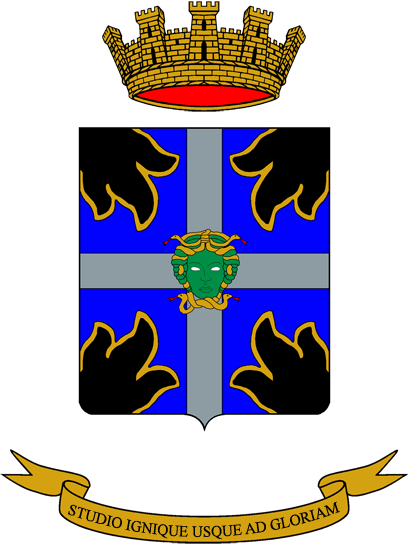
Coat of Arms of the Artillery School.

Through its history, the Artillery School had 57 commanders.

=== Central School of Artillery Shooting (1888-1910) ===
- Ten. Gen. Enrico Giovannetti (1 July 1888 – 29 December 1889);
- Ten. Gen. Orazio Galleani di Sainte Ambroise (19 January 1889 – 31 December 1894);
- Col. Tommaso Schellini (1 January 1895 – 15 February 1895);
- Ten. Col. Aldo Rossi (1 November 1895 – 15 February 1896);
- Col. Emanuele Carrano (12 November 1896 – 3 February 1897);
- Col. Angelo De Luigi (15 October 1897 – 31 May 1898);
- Col. Edoardo De Fabii Pezzani (1 June 1898 – 19 November 1898);
- Col. Giorgio Recli (19 November 1898 – 20 January 1901);
- Ten. Col. Alberto Zola (21 January 1901 – 8 November 1901);
- Col. Giovanni Pila (8 November 1901 – 21 October 1903);
- Col. Felice D'Alessandro (21 October 1903 – 20 January 1907);
- Col. Benedetto Sanfermano (21 January 1907 – 28 November 1909);
- Col. Giulio Strazzeri (28 November 1909 – 30 September 1910).

=== Fortress Artillery School (1910–1919) ===
- Col. Antonio Arnaldi (1910);
- Col. Alfredo Sacchi (1910–1914);
- Col. Giuliano Ricci (15 January 1914 – 10 August 1916).

=== Central School of Field Artillery (1910–1919) ===
- Col. Giulio Strazzeri (1910–1914);
- Col. Pasquale Tozzi (1914–1915);
- Magg. Innocenzo Cipriani (acting);
- Col. Vittorio Buffa di Perrero (1916–1918).

=== Central Artillery School (1920–1943) ===
- Col. Alessandro Del Pozzo (1920–1924);
- Col. Aurelio Ricchetti (20 March 1924 – 22 April 1926);
- Col. Emilio Gamerra (1926–1928);
- Col. Alberto Barbieri (1928–1930);
- Col. Giovanni Zanghieri (1930–1934);
- Col. Pietro Belletti (1934–1937);
- Col. Mario Balotta (1937–1939);
- Col. Umberto Utili (1939–1940);
- Col. Salvatore Pelligra (1940–1942);
- Col. Armando Marasca (1942–1943).

=== Artillery School (1946–2010) ===
- Col. Marcello Palma (1945–1947);
- Col. Mario Brunelli (1947–1951);
- Col. Antonino Duran (1951–1952);
- Col. Alessandro Boselli (1952–1955);
- Col. Michele Giardino (1955–1956);
- Gen. B. Eugenio Coloni (1956–1959);
- Gen. B. Salvatore Pesce (1959–1962);
- Gen. B. Francesco Angioni (1962–1964);
- Gen. B. Mario Palla (1964–1968);
- Gen. B. Aldo Maglietta (1968–1972);
- Gen. B. Natalino Maggiorano (1972–1974);
- Gen. B. Gabriele Starace (1974–1977);
- Gen. B. Pietro F. Muraro (1977–1979);
- Gen. B. Luigi Palmieri (1979–1982);
- Gen. B. Bruno Mori (1982–1985);
- Gen. B. Mario Prato (1985–1989);
- Gen. B. Enzo Conte (1989–1991);
- Gen. B. Giulio Fraticelli (1991–1992);
- Gen. B. Antonino Mozzicato (1992–1994);
- Gen. B. Filippo Salvati (1994–1995);
- Gen. D. Giangiuseppe Santillo (1995–1997);
- Gen. C.A. Giuseppe Morea (2000–2002);
- Gen. D. Carlo Tritonj (2002–2005);
- Col. Alfonso Bonassisa (2005);
- Gen. B. Sergio Fiorentino (2005–2007);
- Gen. D. Paolo Reghenspurger (2007–2008);
- Gen. B. Pippo Filipponi (2008–2010).

== See also ==
- Artillery
- Royal Italian Army
- Italian Army
- Artillery Command (Italy)
