= Pietro Belletti =

Italian general

- Born: 12 June 1884; Rocchetta Tanaro, Kingdom of Italy
- Died: 3 January 1950 (aged 65); Rome, Italy
- Military career
- Allegiance: Kingdom of Italy
- Branch: Royal Italian Army
- Service years: 1903–1945
- Rank: Major General
- Commands: Central School of Artillery; 15th Infantry Division "Bergamo"; 105th Infantry Division "Rovigo"
- Conflicts: Italo-Turkish War; Battle of Sidi Bilal; World War I; Battles of the Isonzo; World War II; Axis invasion of Yugoslavia; Tunisian campaign
- Awards: Silver Medal of Military Valor; Bronze Medal of Military Valor (twice); Military Order of Savoy; Order of the Crown of Italy; Order of Saints Maurice and Lazarus

Pietro Belletti (Rocchetta Tanaro, 12 June 1884 – Rome, 3 January 1950) was an Italian general during World War II.

== Biography ==
He was born in Rocchetta Tanaro, in the province of Alessandria, on June 28, 1884. In 1903 he entered the Royal Military Academy of Artillery and Engineers in Turin, graduating on September 7, 1905 with the rank of artillery second lieutenant. In 1911-1912 he participated in the Italo-Turkish War, where he was awarded a Bronze Medal of Military Valor for his role in the battle of Sidi Bilal. He later took part in the First World War, serving in a field artillery regiment, being wounded on the Isonzo Front in August 1915 and awarded a silver medal and a second bronze medal for military valor. In 1922, while serving with the 23rd Field Artillery Regiment, he was assigned to the military staff of King Victor Emmanuel III. On 8 July 1932 he was promoted to the rank of colonel, and from September 1934 to August 1937 he commanded the Central School of Artillery; having been promoted to brigadier general from 1 July 1937, he was then given command of the artillery of the Army Corps of Udine, until May 1940.

With the entry of the Kingdom of Italy into the Second World War, on 10 June 1940, he was promoted to major general on 1 July of the same year and given command of the 15th Infantry Division "Bergamo". With this division he participated in the invasion of Yugoslavia, in April 1941, and then remained in Croatia for occupation duty until February 28, 1942, when he was replaced by General Alessandro Piazzoni. He then assumed command of the newly formed 105th Infantry Division "Rovigo" until October 1942, when he was appointed commander of the artillery to the Tripoli Headquarters. He was then requested by General Giovanni Messe as commander of the artillery of the 1st Army in Tunisia, where he was taken prisoner on 13 May 1943, when the last Axis forces in North Africa surrendered. He was then transferred to a generals' POW camp in Wilton Park, England; he was released in 1944, following the Armistice of Cassibile, and returned to Italy, where he became Inspector of the Artillery Corps until 1945, when he was placed on absolute leave. He died on January 3, 1950.
