= Raffaele Pelligra =

Italian general (1888–1971)

- Born: 6 December 1888; Comiso, Kingdom of Italy
- Died: 22 September 1971 (aged 82); Rome, Italy
- Military career
- Allegiance: Kingdom of Italy; Italy
- Branch: Royal Italian Army; Italian Army; Guardia di Finanza
- Service years: 1907–1952
- Rank: Lieutenant General
- Commands: 6th Regiment "Lancieri di Aosta"; 13th Infantry Division "Re"; Guardia di Finanza
- Conflicts: First Italo-Senussi War; World War I; Battles of the Isonzo; First Battle of the Piave; Second Italo-Ethiopian War; Battle of Amba Aradam; Italian invasion of Albania; World War II; Italian occupation of Yugoslavia
- Awards: Silver Medal of Military Valor; Bronze Medal of Military Valor (three times); Military Order of Italy; Order of Saints Maurice and Lazarus

Raffaele Pelligra (6 December 1888 – 22 September 1971) was an Italian general during World War II. He was brother of General Salvatore Pelligra. After the war he was commander-general of the Guardia di Finanza from 1947 to 1953.

== Biography ==
He was born in Comiso, Sicily, on 6 December 1888, and in 1908 he entered the Royal Military Academy of Infantry and Cavalry of Modena, from which he graduated with the rank of cavalry second lieutenant on 19 September 1909, initially assigned to the "Cavalleggeri di Lodi" Regiment and then to the 29th "Cavalleggeri di Udine" Regiment in Nola. He participated in the First Italo-Senussi War (where he earned a Silver Medal of Military Valor) with the "Cavalleggeri di Lodi", and then in the Great War as a lieutenant and later captain, initially in command of the 139th Bombard Battery on the Karst plateau, and later as a staff officer in the 49th Division and subsequently the 22nd Division, the 7th Army, the Czechoslovak Army Corps and the 5th Division, on the Piave river. During the war he earned two Bronze Medals of Military Valor.

After attending the War School, in 1919 he was assigned to the Military Division of Pola and later to the 19th "Cavalleggeri Guide" Regiment in 1924. He was promoted to major in 1926 and given command of a squadron group of the "Cavalleggeri del Monferrato" Regiment; after promotion to lieutenant colonel he was assigned to the command of the Staff Officer Corps and to the Motorized Troops Inspectorate, as head of office. In 1935-1936 he was appointed Chief of Staff of the "Sila" Division and participated in the conquest of Ethiopia (where he received another Bronze Medal). On 1 October 1936 he was promoted to colonel and given command of the 6th Regiment "Lancieri di Aosta" in Naples, which he maintained until 14 April 1939, when he was replaced by Colonel Giovanni Imperiali di Francavilla. Also in April 1939, he participated in the invasion of Albania at the head of an ad-hoc cavalry regiment.

On 1 January 1940 he was promoted to brigadier general and appointed quartermaster-general of the 2nd Army, deployed on the border with Yugoslavia. In February 1942 he assumed command of the 13th Infantry Division "Re" in Croatia, replacing General Ottorino Battista Dabbeni, and was promoted to the rank of Major General on 19 October. He was later included by Yugoslavia in a CROWCASS list of Italian personnel wanted for war crimes. On 12 July 1943 he was appointed Chief of Staff of the 7th Army in Potenza, replacing General Furio Monticelli. After the armistice of Cassibile he became director general of the commissariat and administrative services of the Ministry of War. After the end of the war and promotion to lieutenant general, he became the 13th Commander-General of the Guardia di Finanza on 15 July 1947, a post he held until 3 February 1952, when he was retired due to reaching the age limits.
