= Umberto Spigo =

Italian general

- Born: 4 June 1883; Patti, Kingdom of Italy
- Died: 26 August 1954 (aged 71); Turin, Italy
- Military career
- Allegiance: Kingdom of Italy
- Branch: Royal Italian Army
- Service years: 1904–1946
- Rank: Lieutenant general
- Commands: 3rd Heavy Artillery Regiment; Reserve Officer School; 21st Infantry Division Granatieri di Sardegna; XVIII Army Corps
- Conflicts: Italo-Turkish War; World War I; Sixth Battle of the Isonzo; World War II
- Awards: Silver Medal of Military Valor; Order of the Crown of Italy

Umberto Spigo (Patti, 4 June 1883 – Turin, 26 August 1954) was an Italian general during World War II.

== Biography ==
Born in the province of Messina in 1883, he joined the Academy of Artillery and Engineers of Turin, graduating as artillery second lieutenant on 5 September 1904. In 1909 he became lieutenant in the 1st Fortress Artillery Regiment, and on 31 December 1914 Captain in the 10th Fortress Artillery Regiment in Turin, where he was stationed from 1910 to 1915 (except during the Italo-Turkish War), also serving at the Army War School. He participated in the Italo-Turkish War and in World War I, earning a Silver Medal of Military Valor in Gorizia in August 1916 (during the Sixth Battle of the Isonzo), while he was serving at the artillery command of the Army, and on 17 November 1918 he was promoted to lieutenant colonel. He served as adjunct teacher at the Turin War School from 10 March 1919, then as military attaché in Sofia and then in the 1st Heavy Artillery Regiment from 31 March 1927. After promotion to colonel, he was commander of the 3rd Heavy Artillery Regiment and then of the Reserve Officer School in Pola between 1933 and 1934.

From 4 June 1934 he was head of office and later secretary of the Supreme Defense Commission; on 1 January 1937 he was promoted to brigadier general and then he was commander of the Artillery of the Army Corps of Rome from 1 October 1937 to 30 June 1939, when, after promotion to major general, he commanded the 21st Infantry Division Granatieri di Sardegna, also stationed in Rome. On 5 June 1940 he returned to the Supreme Defense Commission, as general secretary. He was then commander of the artillery of the IX Corps in Bari until 1942, and from 8 August of that year he became Acting Commander of the XVIII Corps, stationed in Dalmatia with headquarters in Split, replacing general Quirino Armellini. On the following 29 October, after promotion to lieutenant general, he became commander of the XVIII Corps.

In August 1943 Spigo ordered a hasty court-martial for the garrison of Brač, composed of seventy soldiers, who after being encircled during a heavy partisan attack, had given up its weapons and abandoned the island. The trial only lasted two hours, without hearing any witnesses nor waiting for the required report from the regimental commander; the garrison commander, Captain Leo Banzi, was judged guilty of helping the enemy and surrendering on the field, and another officer, twenty-three Alpini and three Carabinieri were judged guilty of "disbandment during combat" and sentenced to death by firing squad. A further twenty-three Alpini were sentenced to fifteen years of imprisonment. Ten years later, the sentence would be overturned by the territorial military court of Bari, which found that the Brač garrison had resisted the partisan attack to the maximum possible extent.

At the proclamation of the Armistice of Cassibile, on 8 September 1943, General Spigo was at his headquarters in Zara; on 10 September he ordered all troops of the XVIII Corps to cease resistance and handed over the town to the Germans, and five days later he left for Venice, where he was able to escape captivity. He then returned to Piedmont, where he resided, going into hiding until the end of the war.

In 1946 he wrote an important study on the war that has just ended and on the war potential of Italy, entitled Premesse tecniche della disfatta ("Technical premises of the defeat"). He was accused of war crimes by Yugoslavia, but never extradited. He died in Turin in 1954.
