= XVIII Army Corps (Italy) =

The XVIII Army Corps (Italian: XVIII Corpo d'Armata) was a corps of the Royal Italian Army during World War II. It played a role in Italy's military operations, though its specific engagements and structure varied throughout the war. Like other Italian army corps of the time, it was composed of multiple divisions and was responsible for strategic and tactical maneuvers in its assigned sectors.

== History ==
The XVIII Army Corps was created during World War I on 7 June 1916 and dissolved on 5 September 1919.
It was reformed on 10 September 1939 as Army Corps Bolzano, replacing the IV Army Corps at Bolzano, which was transferred to the western frontier.
Renamed XVIII Army Corps on 1 April 1940, it was disbanded again on 25 July 1940.

On 1 July 1941, the XVIII Corps was formed again in Bolzano, and was moved to Split on 3 February 1942, where it took control over the Governorate of Dalmatia.
Its task was to defend the coast and units of the Army Corps were also continuously engaged in actions against Yugoslav partisan formations.
XVIII Army Corps was disarmed by the Germans and dissolved in Venice on 19 September 1943, after the Armistice of Cassibile.

== Units ==
- 15th Infantry Division "Bergamo"
- 12th Infantry Division "Sassari" (until March 1943)
- 151st Infantry Division "Perugia" (until July 1942)
- Zadar Command, renamed 158th Infantry Division "Zara"
- 1st Cavalry Division "Eugenio di Savoia" (from 30 May 1943).

== Commanders ==
- Gen. C.A. Marco Gamaleri (1939 - 1940)
- Gen. C.A. Gabriele Nasci (1941.07.01 – 1942.01.26)
- Gen. C.A. Quirino Armellini (1942.02.01 – 1942.08.05)
- Gen. C.A. Umberto Spigo. (1942.08.05 – 1943.09.08)
