= 12th Bersaglieri Regiment =

Inactive Italian Army infantry unit

- 12° Reggimento bersaglieri
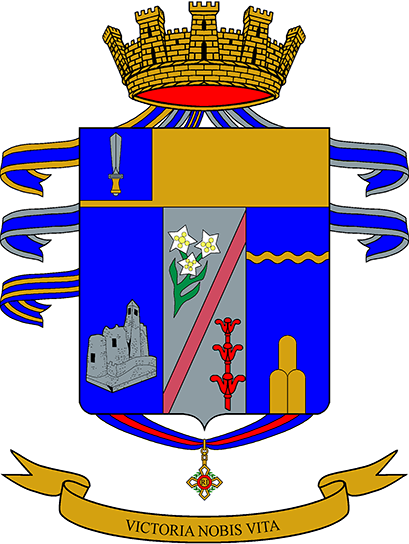
- Regimental coat of arms
- Active: 16 Sept. 1883 - 21 July 1919; 4 Aug. 1919 - 8 Dec. 1942; 1 Oct. 1975 - 15 April 2005
- Country: Italy
- Branch: Italian Army
- Part of: Mechanized Brigade "Aosta"
- Garrison/HQ: Trapani
- Motto: "Victoria Nobis Vita"
- Anniversaries: 18 June 1836
- Decorations: 1x Military Order of Italy; 1x Gold Medal of Military Valor; 3x Silver Medals of Military Valor; 1x Silver Medal of Army Valor

Insignia
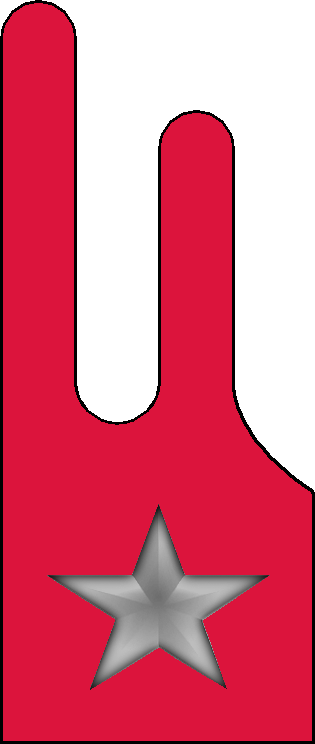
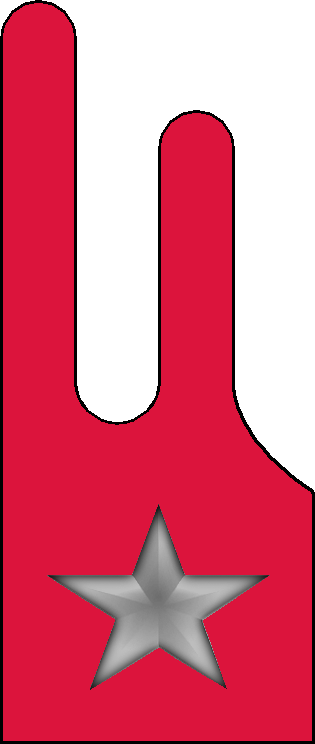
- Bersaglieri gorget patches

The 12th Bersaglieri Regiment (Italian: 12° Reggimento Bersaglieri) is an inactive unit of the Italian Army last based in Trapani in Sicily. The regiment is part of the Italian Army's infantry corps' Bersaglieri speciality and was last operationally assigned to the Mechanized Brigade "Aosta". The regiment was formed in 1883 by the Royal Italian Army with preexisting battalions. During World War I the regiment served on the Italian front. After the war the regiment was disbanded for short time, before it was reformed in August 1919.

During World War II the regiment was assigned to the 133rd Armored Division "Littorio", with which it participated in the Western Desert campaign. In November 1942 the division and regiment were destroyed during the Second Battle of El Alamein. In 1961 the regiment's XXIII Battalion was reformed and assigned to the 182nd Armored Infantry Regiment "Garibaldi". In 1964 the battalion was transferred to the 32nd Tank Regiment. In 1975 the battalion became an autonomous unit as 23rd Bersaglieri Battalion "Castel di Borgo" and was assigned the flag and traditions of the 12th Bersaglieri Regiment. The battalion was assigned to the 32nd Armored Brigade "Mameli" until 1991, when it was transferred to the 132nd Armored Brigade "Ariete". In 1992 the battalion moved to Sicily, where it joined the Mechanized Brigade "Aosta". The same year the battalion lost its autonomy and entered the reformed 12th Bersaglieri Regiment. In 2005 the regiment was renamed 6th Bersaglieri Regiment and the flag of the 12th Bersaglieri Regiment was transferred to the Shrine of the Flags in the Vittoriano in Rome. The regiment's anniversary falls, as for all Bersaglieri units, on 18 June 1836, the day the Bersaglieri speciality was founded.

== History ==
On 16 September 1883 the 12th Bersaglieri Regiment was formed in Verona with the fourth battalions of the 6th Bersaglieri Regiment, 8th Bersaglieri Regiment, and 10th Bersaglieri Regiment. The three battalions were numbered I, II, and III until 18 June 1886, when all Bersaglieri battalions resumed their original numbering. The 12th Bersaglieri Regiment consisted afterwards of the following battalions:

- XXI Battalion, which had been formed in 1860 and been assigned to the 1st Bersaglieri Regiment from 1861 to 1871 and to the 6th Bersaglieri Regiment from 1871 to 1883.
- XXIII Battalion, which had been formed in 1860 and been assigned to the 3rd Bersaglieri Regiment from 1861 to 1871 and to the 8th Bersaglieri Regiment from 1871 to 1883.
- XXXVI Battalion, which had been formed in 1861 and been assigned to the 5th Bersaglieri Regiment from 1861 to 1871 and to the 10th Bersaglieri Regiment from 1871 to 1883.

The XXI and XXIII battalions had participated in 1860 with the Royal Sardinian Army in the Piedmontese invasion of Central and Southern Italy. In 1861 the battalions joined the Royal Italian Army and were assigned to the newly formed Bersaglieri regiments, which at the time had only administrative functions. In 1866 the battalions fought in the Third Italian War of Independence, during which the XXIII Battalion distinguished itself on 23 July 1866 at Castel di Borgo in Borgo Valsugana earning a Silver Medal of Military Valor. When the battalion joined the 12th Bersaglieri Regiment the medal was affixed to the regiment's flag and added to the regiment's coat of arms. In September 1870 the XXI and XXXVI battalions participated in the capture of Rome.

In 1887 the regiment moved from Verona to Vittorio Veneto and in 1891 to Rome. In 1895-96 the regiment provided eleven officers and 379 troops to help form the I, III, V, and VI provisional battalions, which were deployed to Eritrea for the First Italo-Ethiopian War. From 1895 to 1901 the regiment was based in San Remo and from 1901 to 1907 in Brescia. Then the regiment moved to Milan. On 1 October 1910 the regiment formed the XII Bersaglieri Cyclists Battalion. During the Italo-Turkish War in 1911-12 the regiment provided seven officers and 905 troops to augment units deployed for the war.

=== World War I ===
On 20 May 1915, three days before Italy entered World War I, the regiment formed, together with the 6th Bersaglieri Regiment, 9th Bersaglieri Regiment, and 11th Bersaglieri Regiment the Special Bersaglieri Division, which also included the IV Mountain Artillery Group of the 1st Mountain Artillery Regiment and minor support units. On 11 February 1916 the four regiments were grouped together in two brigades: the I Bersaglieri Brigade consisted of the 6th and 12th Bersaglieri regiments, while the II Bersaglieri Brigade consisted of the 9th and 11th Bersaglieri regiments. After not even a year of existence the division was transformed on 5 March 1916 into a standard infantry division, with the infantry Brigade "Piemonte" and Brigade "Aosta" replacing the Bersaglieri brigades, which afterwards were attached, like other Bersaglieri units, to divisions and army corps as needed.

On 1 June 1915 the 12 Bersaglieri Regiment with the XXIII and XXXVI battalions, together with the 89th Infantry Regiment of the Brigade "Salerno" and the Alpini Battalion "Pinerolo" of the 3rd Alpini Regiment, was ordered to take the Monte Mrzli. By 4 June the Italian units were exhausted and the sent to the rear, with the two battalions having lost 14 officers and 344 troops. On 14 August 1915 the 12 Bersaglieri Regiment with the XXI and XXXVI battalions, was ordered to take the Monte Sleme, and again after four days the attack against the entrenched Austro-Hungarian troops failed. During this attack the regiment lost 22 officers and 667 troops. For its conduct in 1915 the regiment was awarded a Silver Medal of Military Valor, which was affixed to the flag of the 6th Bersaglieri Regiment and added to the regiment's coat of arms, when the battalion joined the regiment.

In 1916 the I Bersaglieri Brigade was deployed on the Karst plateau in the area of Veliki Hribach during the Eighth Battle of the Isonzo and then on the Pečinka during the Ninth Battle of the Isonzo. On 31 January 1917 the depot of the 12th Bersaglieri Regiment in Milan formed the command of the 18th Bersaglieri Regiment and the LXVIII Battalion for the new regiment. In 1917 the I Bersaglieri Brigade was deployed on the Monte Vodice during the Tenth Battle of the Isonzo and then moved to the Banjšice plateau for the Eleventh Battle of the Isonzo, during which the brigade distinguished itself on 16-20 August. On 24 October 1917 the Austro-Hungarian Army and Imperial German Army commenced the Battle of Caporetto and the next day the brigade defeated three Austro-Hungarian attacks in the area of Monte Globokak. Afterwards the brigade joined the Italian retreat to the Piave river. After escaping over the Piave river the 6th Bersaglieri Regiment counted nine officers and 1,207 troops as lost, while the 12th Bersaglieri Regiment had lost 49 officers and 1,551 troops. To bring the two regiments back up to strength the 21st Bersaglieri Regiment was disbanded and its personnel assigned to the two regiments. Between 23 November and 5 December 1917 the brigade fought on the Monte Meletta di Gallio during the First Battle of Monte Grappa. Stopping the Austro-Hungarian offensive cost the 6th Bersaglieri Regiment 69 officers and 1,762 troops, while the 12th Bersaglieri Regiment lost 52 officers and 1,670 troops. Afterwards the shattered brigade was sent to Valdagno in the rear to be rebuilt. For its conduct in 1917, especially on Monte Globokak, the 12th Bersaglieri Regiment was awarded its second Silver Medal of Military Valor, which was affixed to the flag of the 6th Bersaglieri Regiment and added to the regiment's coat of arms, when the battalion joined the regiment.

In June 1918 the 12th Bersaglieri Regiment was deployed on Pizzo Razzea in the Val Frenzela during the Second Battle of the Piave River. In October 1918 the brigade participated in the Battle of Vittorio Veneto. The regiment's XII Bersaglieri Cyclists Battalion remained an autonomous unit and fought separate from the regiment. The battalion was disbanded in November 1919. On 17 January 1915 the LVI Bersaglieri Battalion was formed in Barletta with elements and troops drawn from the 12th Bersaglieri Regiment. The battalion remained an autonomous unit throughout the war and was disbanded on 18 November 1917 after the Italian defeat in the Battle of Caporetto and its personnel used to bring the 19th Bersaglieri Regiment back up to full strength. In 1917 the XXIII Assault Unit Crimson Flames (Italian: XXIII Reparto d'Assalto Fiamme Cremisi) was formed with Bersaglieri volunteers. The unit was part of the Arditi and undertook its first mission on 4 May 1917, when elements of the unit crossed Lake Garda and landed on the Austro-Hungarian held side, where the troops destroyed the power plant at Torbole. Between 15 June and 15 July 1918, the XXIII Assault Unit distinguished itself during the Second Battle of the Piave River at Capo Sile and Cà del Bosco, for which the unit was awarded a Gold Medal of Military Valor. The XXIII Assault Unit was disbanded in 1919.

=== Interwar years ===
After the war the 12th Bersaglieri Regiment was disbanded on 21 July 1919 and its battalions assigned to the 4th Bersaglieri Regiment, 7th Bersaglieri Regiment and 11th Bersaglieri Regiment, which renumbered the battalions upon entry. Already on 4 August 1919 the regiment was reformed with battalions of other disbanded Bersaglieri regiments. In March 1920 the XXXVI Battalion was reduced to reserve unit, followed on 31 August 1921 by the XXI Battalion. On 1 May 1923 the XXI Battalion was reformed as active unit and in July 1924 the regiment became a cyclists unit. In 1933 the regiment moved from Milan to Pula. In 1935-36 ten officers of the regiment were assigned to other units for the Second Italo-Ethiopian War. In 1936 the regiment lost its role as cyclists unit. In May 1937 the regiment formed a Non-commissioned Officers Cadets Company and in November 1937 the Complement Officers Cadets Battalion moved from Bassano del Grappa to Pula and joined the regiment.

On 1 April 1939 the XXXVI Battalion was reformed as replacement for the XXIII Battalion, which participated in the Italian invasion of Albania and remained afterwards in Albania on occupation duty until 15 November 1939. On 7 September 1939 the regiment was reorganized as a motorcyclists unit and consisted now of the following units:

- 12th Bersaglieri Regiment
  - Command Company
  - XXI Motorcyclists Battalion
  - XXXVI Auto-transported Battalion
  - 12th Cannons Company with 47/32 mod. 35 anti-tank guns

In October 1939 the Complement Officers Cadets Battalion left the regiment and became the Bersaglieri Officers Cadets School. The same month the regiment moved from Pula to Reggio Emilia, where it joined the 133rd Armored Division "Littorio", which also included the 33rd Tank Infantry Regiment and 133rd Armored Artillery Regiment.

=== World War II ===
After the XXIII Battalion returned from Albania it joined the regiment as XXIII Auto-transported Battalion. In April 1941 the regiment participated in the Invasion of Yugoslavia. On 1 August 1941 the regiment was reorganized as a North-African-type regiment, and consisted afterwards of the following units:

- 12th Bersaglieri Regiment
  - Command Company
  - XXI Support Weapons Battalion
  - XXIII Auto-transported Battalion
  - XXXVI Auto-transported Battalion
  - 12th Motorcyclists Company
  - Transport Unit

In January 1942 the 133rd Armored Division "Littorio" was transferred to Libya to reinforce the German-Italian Panzer Group Africa, which was fighting in the Western Desert campaign against the British Eighth Army. Due to British air and naval attacks originating in Malta the transfer of the division took months and was accompanied by severe losses of men and equipment. On 24 January 1942, the troopship carrying the regiment's XXXVI Battalion was torpedoed and sunk by a British Fairey Albacore aircraft of 826 Squadron, Fleet Air Arm. The battalion lost 2/3 of its men in the waters of the Mediterranean.

The Littorio did not participate in the Battle of Gazala. On 20 June 1942 the regiment, with two Bersaglieri battalions, two tank companies of the LI Tank Battalion, and a battery of the CCCXXI Artillery Group arrived at the front, and participated in the Axis capture of Tobruk. The entire division participated then in the Battle of Mersa Matruh, and afterwards pursued the British Eighth Army to El Alamein. During the First Battle of El Alamein battalions of the 133rd Armored Division "Littorio" were heavily engaged. On 30 August 1942 the regiment participated in the Battle of Alam el Halfa as part of the Italian XX Motorized Army Corps, which consisted the 101st Motorized Division "Trieste", 132nd Armored Division "Ariete", and 133rd Armored Division "Littorio", and advanced to the left of the German Afrika Korps.

By then the regiment was reduced to a strength of 1,000 men. On 23 October 1942 the Second Battle of El Alamein began and on 4 November the XX Motorized Army Corps, with the Littorio, Ariete and Trieste divisions, was destroyed by the British 1st Armoured Division and 10th Armoured Division. The remnants of the regiment retreated to Tripoli, where on 8 December 1942 the 12th Bersaglieri Regiment was declared lost due to wartime events. The remaining troops of the regiment were assigned to the 7th Bersaglieri Regiment.

In February 1942 the regiment's depot in Reggio Emilia formed the CXXXIII Armored Bersaglieri Battalion, which consisted of two companies with AB 41 armored cars and was intended as reconnaissance unit for the 133rd Armored Division "Littorio". After the battalion arrived in North Africa it was assigned on 11 May 1942 to the 101st Motorized Division "Trieste" and renumbered VIII Armored Bersaglieri Battalion.

=== Cold War ===
On 11 April 1961 the I Bersaglieri Battalion of the 182nd Armored Infantry Regiment "Garibaldi" was renumbered XXIII Bersaglieri Battalion. On 24 September 1964 the battalion was renumbered XI Bersaglieri Battalion and on 20 October of the same year the XII Bersaglieri Battalion of the 32nd Tank Regiment was renumbered as XXIII Bersaglieri Battalion.

During the 1975 army reform the army disbanded the regimental level and newly independent battalions were granted for the first time their own flags. On 30 September 1975 the 32nd Tank Regiment was disbanded and the next day the regiment's XXIII Bersaglieri Battalion in Tauriano became an autonomous unit and was renamed 23rd Bersaglieri Battalion "Castel di Borgo". The battalion was named for Castel di Borgo in Borgo Valsugana, where the XXIII Battalion had earned a Silver Medal of Military Valor on 23 July 1866 during the Third Italian War of Independence. The battalion was assigned to the 32nd Armored Brigade "Mameli" and consisted of a command, a command and services company, three mechanized companies with M113 armored personnel carriers, and a heavy mortar company with M106 mortar carriers with 120mm Mod. 63 mortars. The battalion fielded now 896 men (45 officers, 100 non-commissioned officers, and 751 soldiers).

On 12 November 1976 the President of the Italian Republic Giovanni Leone assigned with decree 846 the flag and traditions of the 12th Bersaglieri Regiment and the traditions of the XXIII Assault Unit Crimson Flames to the battalion. The traditions of the latter included the Gold Medal of Military Valor, which the XXIII Assault Unit had earned during the Second Battle of the Piave River. The medal was affixed to the flag of the 23rd Bersaglieri Battalion "Castel di Borgo" and added to the battalion's coat of arms. For its conduct and work after the 1976 Friuli earthquake the battalion was awarded a Silver Medal of Army Valor, which was affixed to the battalion's flag and added to the battalion's coat of arms.

From October 1983 to January 1984 the battalion's 9th Company, which consisted of two officers, nine non-commissioned officers and 99 soldiers, was attached to the 3rd Bersaglieri Battalion "Cernaia" for the deployment to Lebanon with the Multinational Force in Lebanon.

=== Recent times ===
After the end of the Cold War the Italian Army began to draw down its forces and on 1 April 1991 the 32nd Armored Brigade "Mameli" was disbanded. The same day the 23rd Bersaglieri Battalion "Castel di Borgo" was transferred to the 132nd Armored Brigade "Ariete". On 31 March 1992 the battalion moved from Tauriano to Trapani in Sicily, where it joined the Mechanized Brigade "Aosta". On 2 September 1992 the 23rd Bersaglieri Battalion "Castel di Borgo" lost its autonomy and the next day entered the reformed 12th Bersaglieri Regiment.

On 15 April 2005 the regiment was renamed 6th Bersaglieri Regiment and the flag of the 12th Bersaglieri Regiment was transferred to the Shrine of the Flags in the Vittoriano in Rome.

== See also ==
- Bersaglieri
