= 11th Bersaglieri Regiment =

Active Italian Army mechanized infantry unit

- 11° Reggimento Bersaglieri
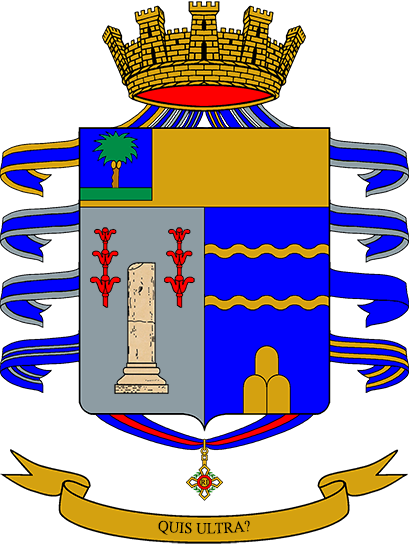
- Regimental coat of arms
- Active: 16 Sept. 1883 — 9 Sept. 1943; 1 Nov. 1975 — today
- Country: Italy
- Branch: Bersaglieri
- Type: Infantry
- Size: Regiment
- Part of: 132nd Armored Brigade "Ariete"
- Garrison/HQ: Orcenico Superiore
- Motto: "Quis ultra?"
- Anniversaries: 18 June 1836
- Engagements: Italo-Turkish War; World War I World War II; Operation Ancient Babylon
- Decorations: 1x Military Order of Italy; 1x Gold Medal of Military Valor; 4x Silver Medals of Military Valor; 1x Bronze Medal of Military Valor; 1x War Cross of Military Valor; 1x Bronze Medal of Army Valor; 1x Gold Cross of Army Merit

Insignia
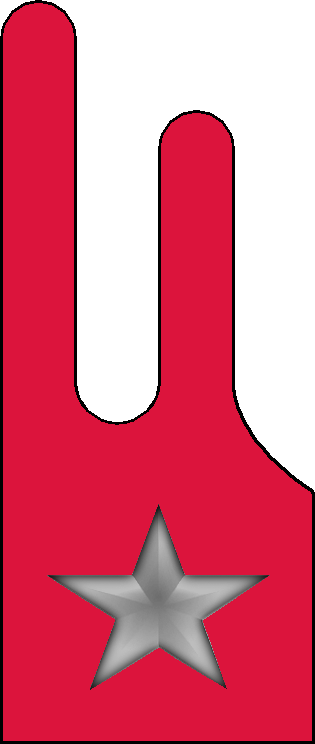
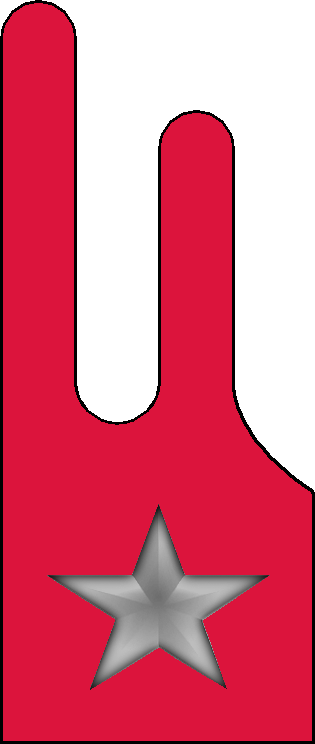
- Bersaglieri gorget patches

The 11th Bersaglieri Regiment (Italian: 11° Reggimento Bersaglieri) is an active unit of the Italian Army based in Orcenico Superiore in the Friuli-Venezia Giulia region. The regiment is part of the army's infantry corps' Bersaglieri speciality and operationally assigned to the 132nd Armored Brigade "Ariete". The regiment was formed in 1883 by the Royal Italian Army with preexisting battalions. The regiment served in Libya during the Italo-Turkish War, where it earned a Gold Medal of Military Valor. During World War I the regiment served on the Italian front.

During World War II the regiment was assigned to the 1st Cavalry Division "Eugenio di Savoia", with which it served in the Invasion of Yugoslavia. Afterwards the regiment remained in occupied Yugoslavia on anti-partisan duty. The regiment was disbanded on 9 September 1943 by German forces. In 1975 the regiment's XXVII Battalion was reformed as 27th Bersaglieri Battalion "Jamiano". The battalion was assigned to the 132nd Armored Brigade "Manin", which in 1986 was renamed 132nd Armored Brigade "Ariete". In 1992 the battalion lost its autonomy and entered the reformed 11th Bersaglieri Regiment. In 1997 the 27th Bersaglieri Battalion "Jamiano" was renamed 11th Bersaglieri Battalion "Caprera".

The regiment's anniversary falls, as for all Bersaglieri units, on 18 June 1836, the day the Bersaglieri speciality was founded.

== History ==
On 16 September 1883 the 11th Bersaglieri Regiment was formed in Caserta with the fourth battalions of the 1st Bersaglieri Regiment, 4th Bersaglieri Regiment, and 7th Bersaglieri Regiment. The three battalions were numbered I, II, and III until 18 June 1886, when all Bersaglieri battalions resumed their original numbering. The 11th Bersaglieri Regiment consisted afterwards of the following battalions:

- XV Battalion, which had been formed in 1859 and been assigned to the 2nd Bersaglieri Regiment from 1861 to 1871 and to the 7th Bersaglieri Regiment from 1871 to 1883.
- XXVII Battalion, which had been formed in 1860 and been assigned to the 1st Bersaglieri Regiment from 1861 to 1883.
- XXXIII Battalion, which had been formed in 1861 and been assigned to the 6th Bersaglieri Regiment from 1861 to 1871 and to the 4th Bersaglieri Regiment from 1871 to 1883.

The XXVII Battalion had participated in 1860 with the Royal Sardinian Army in the Piedmontese invasion of Central and Southern Italy. In 1861 the battalions joined the Royal Italian Army and were assigned to the newly formed Bersaglieri regiments, which at the time had only administrative functions. In 1866 the three battalions fought in the Third Italian War of Independence. In September 1870 the XXXIII Battalion participated in the capture of Rome.

In 1886 the regiment moved from Caserta to Florence and in 1892 to Verona. In 1895-96 the regiment provided ten officers and 423 troops to help form the I, III, IV, and V provisional battalions, which were deployed to Eritrea for the First Italo-Ethiopian War. From 1899 to 1903 the regiment was based in Ancona and from 1903 to 1909 in Asti. Then the regiment moved to Naples. On 1 October 1910 the regiment's depot in Naples formed the XI Cyclists Battalion.

=== Italo-Turkish War ===
In 1911, the regiment was deployed to Libya for the Italo-Turkish War. On 23 October 1911, the regiment fought in the Battle at Shar al-Shatt. During the battle the XXVII Battalion's 4th and 5th companies were driven back by Ottoman troops and around 290 Italian soldiers surrendered. By 17:00h the situation was stabilized by the arrival of a battalion of the 82nd Infantry Regiment "Torino", which together with the 57 survivors of the 4th and 5th companies drove the Ottoman troops back. Once Shar al-Shatt was back under Italian control the Italians discovered that the 290 soldiers, who had surrendered had been massacred by the Ottomans. The massacre of the Italian troops led to harsh reprisals by the Italians against the civilian population in the area.

For the conduct and sacrifice of its troops during the Battle at Shar al-Shatt the regiment was awarded a Gold Medal of Military Valor, which was affixed to the regiment's flag and added to the regiment's coat of arms.

In June 1912 the regiment's depot in Naples formed the XXXIX Battalion. On 26–28 June 1912 the XV Battalion and XXVII Battalion participated in the occupation of Sidi Said, and on 20 September of the same year the regiment participated in the Battle of Zanzur. On 23 March 1913 the XXVII Battalion and XXXIII Battalion distinguished themselves in the Battle of Assaba, for which the regiment was awarded a Bronze Medal of Military Valor, which was affixed to the regiment's flag and added to the regiment's coat of arms. At the end of 1913 the regiment returned to Naples, while the XV Bersaglieri Battalion remained in Italian Libya as an autonomous battalion. In 1914 the regiment moved from Naples to Ancona.

=== World War I ===
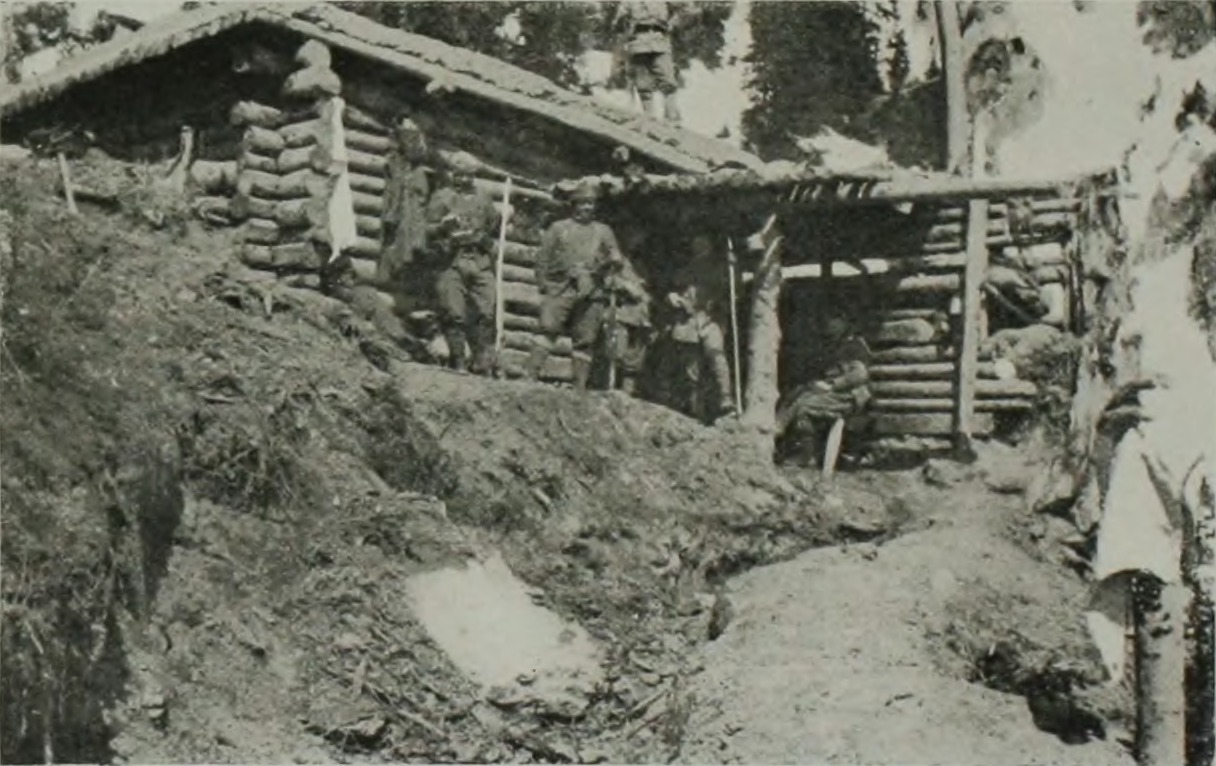
Bersaglieri of the 11th Bersaglieri Regiment at Blockhouse No. 6 near Lake Bordaglia during World War I.

At the outbreak of World War I the regiment consisted of the XXVII, XXXIII, and XXXIX battalions and the XI Cyclists Battalion, which operated as an autonomous unit throughout the war. On 20 May 1915, three days before Italy entered the war, the regiment formed, together with the 6th Bersaglieri Regiment, 9th Bersaglieri Regiment, and 12th Bersaglieri Regiment the Special Bersaglieri Division, which also included the IV Mountain Artillery Group of the 1st Mountain Artillery Regiment and minor support units. In July 1915 the division fought in the First Battle of the Isonzo on the Karst plateau at Monte San Michele, in August of the same year in the Second Battle of the Isonzo in the area of Bovec, and in September on the slopes of Monte Javoršček. On 11 February 1916 the four regiments were grouped together in two brigades: the I Bersaglieri Brigade consisted of the 6th and 12th Bersaglieri regiments, while the II Bersaglieri Brigade consisted of the 9th and 11th Bersaglieri regiments. After not even a year of existence the division was reorganized on 5 March 1916 as a standard infantry division, with the Brigade "Piemonte" and Brigade "Aosta" replacing the two Bersaglieri brigades, which afterwards were attached, like other Bersaglieri units, to divisions and army corps as needed.

In August 1916 the II Bersaglieri Brigade fought in the Sixth Battle of the Isonzo and Seventh Battle of the Isonzo in the Monfalcone sector. On 6 November 1916 the 9th Bersaglieri Regiment was replaced by the 7th Bersaglieri Regiment. The brigade then returned to the Karst plateau. In May 1917 the II Bersaglieri Brigade fought at Jamiano. On 2 June 1917, the brigade was taken out of the front to rest, but only two days later it returned to the first line as on 3 June 1917 the Royal Italian Army began the Battle of Flondar, which was part of the larger Tenth Battle of the Isonzo. For its conduct at Jamiano and Flondar the 11th Bersaglieri Regiment was awarded a Silver Medal of Military Valor, which was affixed to the regiment's flag and added to the regiment's coat of arms.

In October 1917 the brigade fought in the Battle of Caporetto on Monte Piana and on Mauria Pass. In October 1918 the brigade participated in the Battle of Vittorio Veneto, initially at Serravalle and then at Revine Lago. On 1 November the brigade was taken out of the front and sent to Venice, where it boarded ships and sailed for Trieste. On 3 November the 7th Bersaglieri Regiment's X Battalion and the 11th Bersaglieri Regiment's XXXIX Battalion disembarked in Trieste and occupied the city. The rest of the brigade followed in the course of the day.

In 1915 the regiment's depot in Ancona formed the LI Battalion, which operated as an autonomous unit until 5 January 1916, when the battalion joined the newly formed 15th Bersaglieri Regiment. On 22 November 1915 the depot formed the LXII Battalion for the 13th Bersaglieri Regiment. On 31 January 1917 the depot formed the LXVII Battalion for the 18th Bersaglieri Regiment, and on 6 February of the same year the depot formed the regimental command and the LXVI Battalion for the 17th Bersaglieri Regiment. On 28 May 1918 the regiment's XV Battalion left Italian Libya and returned to Italy, where it was assigned on 29 June 1918 to the 5th Group of the 2nd Assault Division, with which it continued to serve until the end of the war.

Throughout the war the XI Cyclists Battalion fought as an autonomous unit. Over the course of the war the battalion was awarded three Silver Medals of Military Valor: one for the conquest of Monte San Michele in July 1916, one for the tenacious defense of Hill 144 east of Monfalcone from 14 to 16 September 1916, and one for breaking through the Austro-Hungarian lines at Revine Lago on 30 October 1918. This made the XI Cyclists Battalion the most decorated Bersaglieri unit of the war.

=== Interwar years ===
After World War I the Royal Italian Army reduced its forces and the regiment was reduced to the XXVII Battalion, XXXIII Battalion, and XI Cyclists Battalion. The XV Battalion was disbanded, while the XXXIX became a reserve unit. On 10 November 1920 the XI Cyclists Battalion was reduced to a company sized formation, which was given the name Cyclists Company of Venezia Giulia. During the same year also the XXXIX Battalion was disbanded. On 23 March 1921 the Cyclists Company was disbanded and the battalion's three Silver Medals of Military Valor were affixed to the flag of the 11th Bersaglieri Regiment. On 6 September 1921 the XXVII Battalion became a reserve unit and the regiment consisted of just one active battalion. The same year the regiment moved to Postojna. On 1 January 1923 the XXVII Battalion was reformed as active unit, while the XV Battalion became the regiment's reserve battalion. The regiment then moved from Postojna to Opatija.

On 1 May 1923 the regiment became a cyclists unit. In 1924 the XV Battalion and XXXIII Battalion switched numbers, and the latter became the regiment's reserve battalion. In 1925 the regiment moved from Opatija to Gradisca d'Isonzo. In 1935-36 three officers and 82 troops of the regiment were assigned to other units for the Second Italo-Ethiopian War. In 1936 the regiment lost its role as cyclists unit. On 1 February 1938, the 11th Bersaglieri Regiment, together with the cavalry regiments "Piemonte Reale" (2nd) and "Cavalleggeri di Saluzzo" (12th), the 1st Fast Artillery Regiment, and the I Light Tank Group "San Giusto", was assigned to the 1st Cavalry Division "Eugenio di Savoia". The same year the regiment reformed the XXXIII Battalion and received the 71st Cannons Company, which was equipped with 47/32 mod. 35 anti-tank guns.

=== World War II ===
In April 1939 the regiment's XXVII Battalion participated in the Invasion of Albania. At the outbreak of World War II the regiment consisted of a command, a command company, the XV Battalion, the XXVII Battalion, the XXXIII Battalion, the 11th Bersaglieri Motorcyclists Company, and the 71st Cannons Company. On 6 March 1941, the 11th Bersaglieri Regiment was deployed to the Vipava Valley, and on 11 April the whole division participated in the Invasion of Yugoslavia. After the invasion the regiment remained in occupied Yugoslavia, where it fought against Yugoslav Partisans. On 1 June 1941 the XXXIII Battalion was transferred to the VII Army Corps on Corsica. One month later, on 1 July, the regiment's depot in Gradisca d'Isonzo formed the LI Bersaglieri Training Battalion, which the regiment ceded one month later to the 2nd Cavalry Division "Emanuele Filiberto Testa di Ferro". The regiment was disbanded by German forces one day after the announcement of the Armistice of Cassibile on 8 September 1943.

After the announcement of the Armistice of Cassibile the XXXIII Battalion, together with other Italian units based in Corsica, fought against retreating German forces. The battalion was then moved to Sardinia. On 1 February 1944 the battalion entered the reformed 4th Bersaglieri Regiment, which participated in the Italian Campaign, first as part of the I Motorized Grouping and then with the Italian Liberation Corps.

=== Cold War ===
In 1964 the XI Bersaglieri Battalion was formed in Sacile. The battalion received the traditions of the XI Cyclists Battalion and was assigned to the 182nd Armored Infantry Regiment "Garibaldi". During the 1975 army reform the army disbanded the regimental level and newly independent battalions were granted for the first time their own flags. On 31 October 1975 the 132nd Tank Regiment was disbanded and the next day the regiment's XXXVIII Bersaglieri Battalion in Aviano became an autonomous unit and was renamed 27th Bersaglieri Battalion "Jamiano". The battalion was named for Jamiano, where the 11th Bersaglieri Regiment had earned a Silver Medal of Military Valor during World War I. The battalion was assigned to the 132nd Armored Brigade "Manin" and consisted of a command, a command and services company, three mechanized companies with M113 armored personnel carriers, and a heavy mortar company with M106 mortar carriers with 120mm Mod. 63 mortars. The battalion fielded now 896 men (45 officers, 100 non-commissioned officers, and 751 soldiers).

On 15 July 1976 the 182nd Armored Infantry Regiment "Garibaldi" was disbanded and the next day the XI Bersaglieri Battalion became an autonomous unit and was renamed 11th Bersaglieri Battalion "Caprera". The flag, motto and traditions of the 182nd Armored Infantry Regiment "Garibaldi" were assigned to the 11th Bersaglieri Battalion "Caprera". With the traditions the battalion also inherited the regiment's right to wear a red tie with the formal uniform.

On 12 November 1976 the President of the Italian Republic Giovanni Leone assigned with decree 846 the flag and traditions of the 11th Bersaglieri Regiment to the battalion. In 1986 the Italian Army abolished the divisional level and brigades, which until then had been under one of the Army's four divisions, came forthwith under direct command of the Army's 3rd Army Corps or 5th Army Corps. As the Armored Division "Ariete" carried a historically significant name, the division ceased to exist on 30 September in Pordenone, and the next day in the same location the 132nd Armored Brigade "Ariete" was activated. The new brigade took command of the units of the 132nd Armored Brigade "Manin", whose name was stricken from the roll of active units of the Italian Army.

=== Recent times ===
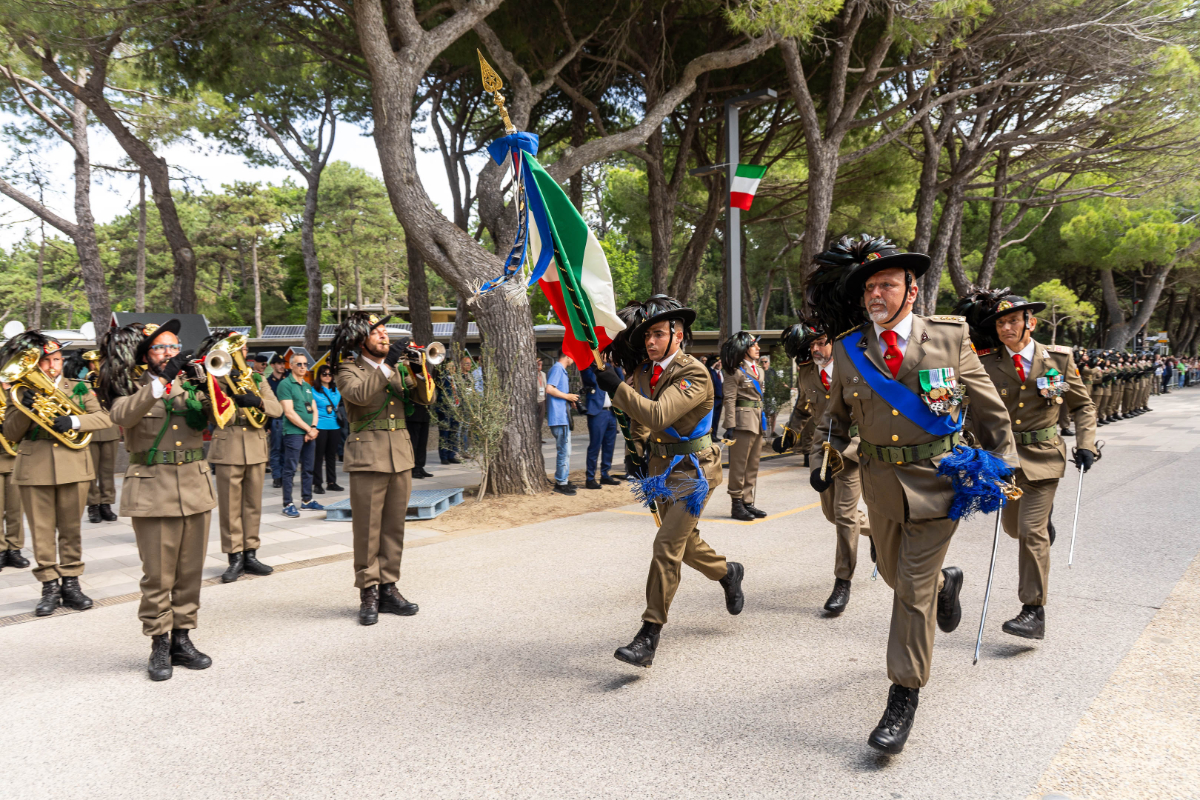
11th Bersaglieri Regiment flag at the 73th National Bersaglieri Rally

On 16 May 1991 the 11th Bersaglieri Battalion "Caprera" moved from Orcenico Superiore to Bari. On 29 September 1992 the 27th Bersaglieri Battalion "Jamiano" lost its autonomy and the next day the battalion entered the reformed 11th Bersaglieri Regiment. On 21 November of the same year the 11th Bersaglieri Regiment moved from Aviano to Orcenico Superiore. On 18 April 1997 the 27th Bersaglieri Battalion "Jamiano" was renamed 11th Bersaglieri Battalion "Caprera", thus reuniting the regiment with its most decorated battalion. Consequently the battalion's three Silver Medals of Military Valor and its Bronze Medal of Army Valor were transferred to the flag of the 11th Bersaglieri Regiment, and the regiment's coat of arms was updated to depicted the four medals. With the return of the 11th Bersaglieri Battalion to the regiment, the tradition of the 182nd Armored Infantry Regiment "Garibaldi" to wear a red tie with the formal uniform was passed on to 11th Bersaglieri Regiment.

In 2004 the regiment served in Iraq as part of the Multi-National Force – Iraq. During the night of 5 to 6 April 2004 forces of Muqtada al-Sadr's Mahdi Army occupied the three main bridges in Nasiriyah. The next day the 11th Bersaglieri Regiment, one squadron of the Regiment "Savoia Cavalleria" (3rd), and logistic units of the 132nd Armored Brigade "Ariete" engaged in an 18-hours long firefight with the rebel forces. For retaking the three bridges the 11th Bersaglieri Regiment was decorated with a War Cross of Military Valor, which was affixed to the regiment's flag and is depicted on the regiment's coat of arms.

== Organization ==
11th Bersaglieri Regiment Dardo infantry fighting vehicles during exercise "Apollo 01-26"

As of 2024 the 11th Bersaglieri Regiment is organized as follows:

- 11th Bersaglieri Regiment, in Orcenico Superiore
  - Command and Logistic Support Company
  - 11th Bersaglieri Battalion "Caprera"
    - 1st Bersaglieri Company
    - 2nd Bersaglieri Company
    - 3rd Bersaglieri Company
    - Maneuver Support Company

The regiment is equipped with tracked Dardo infantry fighting vehicles. The Maneuver Support Company is equipped with M106 120mm mortar carriers and Dardo IFVs with Spike LR anti-tank guided missiles.

== Notable members ==
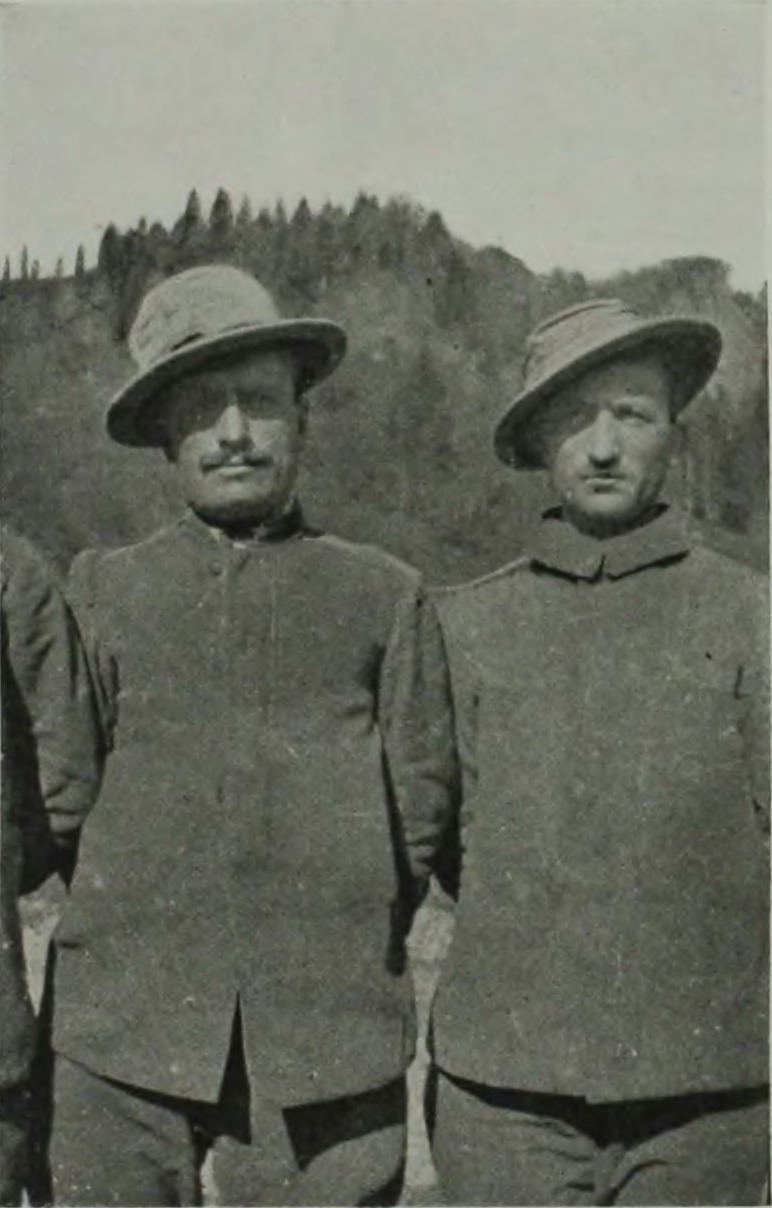
Corporal Benito Mussolini (on the left) and Bersagliere Oreste Reali during World War I.

Between 13 September 1915 and 28 December 1917, Benito Mussolini served in the 11th Bersaglieri Regiment.

== See also ==
- Bersaglieri
