= 11th Bersaglieri Battalion "Caprera" =

Inactive Italian Army infantry unit

- 11° Battaglione Bersaglieri "Caprera"
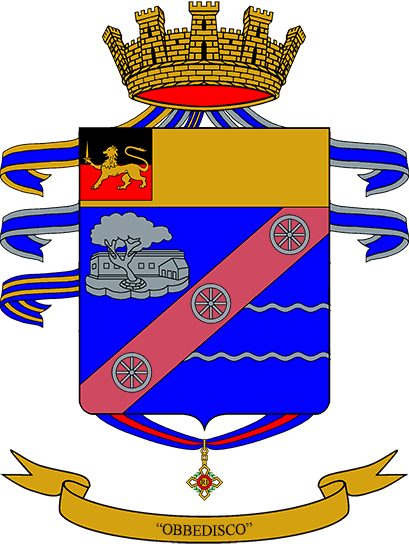
- Battalion coat of arms
- Country: Italy
- Branch: Italian Army
- Part of: 8th Mechanized Brigade "Garibaldi"
- Garrison/HQ: Orcenico Superiore
- Motto: "Obbedisco"
- Anniversaries: 18 June 1836
- Decorations: 1x Gold Medal of Military Valor^{*} 3x Silver Medals of Military Valor; 1x Bronze Medal of Army Valor * temporarily assigned

Insignia
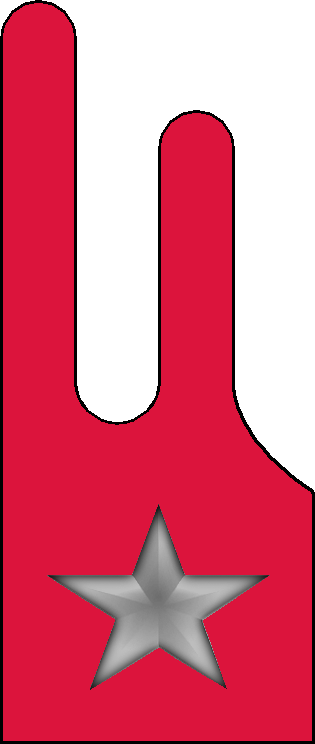
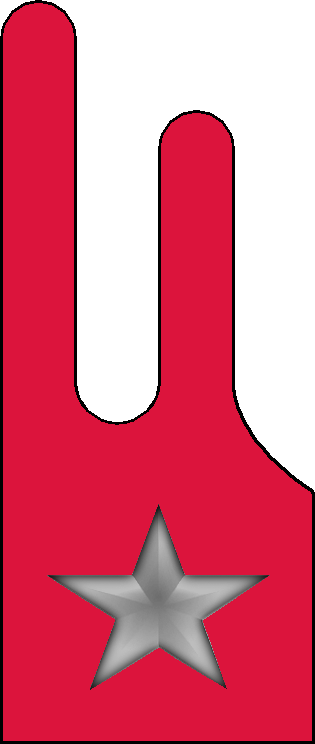
- Bersaglieri gorget patches

The 11th Bersaglieri Battalion "Caprera" (Italian: 11° Battaglione Bersaglieri "Caprera") is an inactive Italian Army Bersaglieri unit. Originally formed in 1910 by the 11th Bersaglieri Regiment as a cyclists battalion, the battalion fought separate from the regiment on the Italian front during World War I. With three Silver Medals of Military Valor the battalion was the most decorated Bersaglieri unit of the war.

In 1964 the battalion was reformed and assigned to the 182nd Armored Infantry Regiment "Garibaldi". During the 1975 army reform the regiment was disbanded and the battalion became an autonomous unit. The battalion inherited the regiment's flag, motto and traditions. In 1992 the battalion lost its autonomy and entered the 7th Bersaglieri Regiment. In 1997 the battalion's name and traditions were transferred from the 7th Bersaglieri Regiment to the 11th Bersaglieri Regiment, thus reuniting the battalion with its parent regiment. The battalion's anniversary falls, as for all Bersaglieri units, on 18 June 1836, the day the Bersaglieri speciality was founded.

== History ==
=== World War I ===
On 1 October 1910 the XI Bersaglieri Cyclists Battalion was formed in Naples by the 11th Bersaglieri Regiment. During World War I the battalion fought separate from the regiment on the Italian front. In May 1915 the battalion advanced to Gradisca and in June to Lucinico. On 19 July of the same year the battalion deployed on Monte San Michele for the Second Battle of the Isonzo. The next day, on 20 July 1915, the battalion attacked and conquered the summit of the Monte San Michele. On 21 July Austro-Hungarian troops counterattacked and drove the battalion off the summit. Having lost 13 officers and 183 troops the battalion was taken out of the front. For the conquest of the summit the battalion was awarded its first Silver Medal of Military Valor.

In spring 1916 the battalion held the front at Vermegliano and the nearby Cave di Selz. On 6 August 1916, the day the Sixth Battle of the Isonzo began, the battalion, together with the III Bersaglieri Cyclists Battalion and IV Bersaglieri Cyclists Battalion, stormed Height 85 near Monfalcone and held the summit until 10 August. As the battalion had lost 14 officers and 319 troops it had to be pulled out of the line. For the conquest of Height 85 the IV and XI Bersaglieri cyclists battalions were both awarded a Silver Medal of Military Valor. For the Seventh Battle of the Isonzo] the battalion was back in the first line and together with the III Bersaglieri Cyclists Battalion tasked with taking Height 144 to the East of Monfalcone on the battle's first day. On 14 September 1916 the two battalions attacked and by evening succeeded to take and hold the height against repeated Austro-Hungarian counterattacks. On 16 September the two shattered battalions were replaced by other Italian units. The XI Bersaglieri Cyclists Battalion had to be pulled out of the front again as it had lost 16 officers and 320 troops in the preceding three days. For the conquest of the Height 144 the III and XI Bersaglieri cyclists battalions were both awarded a Silver Medal of Military Valor. For the Eighth Battle of the Isonzo in October 1916 the battalion returned to Height 144, while during the Ninth Battle of the Isonzo later in the same month the battalion was deployed at Doberdò.

On 2 January 1917 the battalion was pulled out of the front and sent to Binago for more than three months of rest. On 20 April the battalion left Binago and returned to the Isonzo front. On 27 May the battalion was back in the first line on Monte Flondar and fought there in the Tenth Battle of the Isonzo. Already on 30 May the battalion had to be pulled back for the losses it had suffered. The rest of the summer the battalion recovered in the rear. During the Eleventh Battle of the Isonzo in August and September 1917 the battalion was at Pieve Tesino, where it was only lightly engaged. On 24 October 1917 the Austro-Hungarian Army and Imperial German Army commenced the Battle of Caporetto. On 27 October the battalion was sent to Sella Nevea pass to try to slow down the enemy offensive, but already by evening the battalion was ordered to retreat to Saletto near Chiusaforte. For the next 14 days the battalion was every day in combat with the advancing enemy until the battalion managed to escape over the Piave river on 11 November 1917.

In June 1918 the battalion was in the first line along the Piave near Fossalta during the Second Battle of the Piave River. In the Battle of Vittorio Veneto the battalion has initially held in reserve, but once Italian troops had forced the Piave river at Ponte della Priula the battalion crossed the river on 29 October 1918 and commenced the pursuit of the retreating Austrians. On 30 October the battalion departed from Susegana, passed Santa Maria di Feletto and Corbanese, and then clashed with an Austro-Hungarian rearguard at Revine Lago. By evening of the 30th the battalion had marched almost 30 km and the next day reached Vittorio Veneto. On 1 November the pursuit continued and on 2 November the battalion reached Longarone where the battalion fought against another Austro-Hungarian rearguard the next day. On 4 November, the day the Armistice of Villa Giusti came into force, the battalion had reached Selva di Cadore.

After World War I the Royal Italian Army reduced its forces and on 10 November 1920 the battalion was reduced to a company sized formation, which was given the name Cyclists Company of Venezia Giulia. On 23 March 1921 the company was disbanded. The three silver medals the battalion had earned during the war were affixed to the flag of the 11th Bersaglieri Regiment.

=== Cold War ===
On 20 November 1964 the XXIII Bersaglieri Battalion in Sacile of the 182nd Armored Infantry Regiment "Garibaldi" was renamed XI Bersaglieri Battalion. As the 11th Bersaglieri Regiment was inactive at the time and three Silver Medals of Military Valor, which had been awarded to the XI Bersaglieri Cyclists Battalion in World War I, were temporarily assigned to the 182nd Armored Infantry Regiment "Garibaldi" and affixed to the regiment's flag and added to the regiment's coat of arms.

During the 1975 army reform the army disbanded the regimental level and newly independent battalions were granted for the first time their own flags. On 15 July 1976 the 182nd Armored Infantry Regiment "Garibaldi" became the last infantry regiment to disband and the next day the XI Bersaglieri Battalion became an autonomous unit and was renamed 11th Bersaglieri Battalion "Caprera". The battalion was named for the island of Caprera, where the regiment's namesake Giuseppe Garibaldi had spent the last years of his life. The flag, motto and traditions of the 182nd Armored Infantry Regiment "Garibaldi" were assigned to the 11th Bersaglieri Battalion "Caprera", while the name of the regiment was transferred to the 8th Mechanized Brigade "Garibaldi". With the flag the battalion also took temporarily possession of the Gold Medal of Military Valor, which had been awarded to the 182nd Infantry Regiment "Garibaldi" for the conduct and sacrifice of the infantry units of the Division "Garibaldi" in Yugoslavia between September 1943 and April 1945. The gold medal was also added to the coat of arms that was issued to the 11th Bersaglieri Battalion "Caprera". With the traditions the battalion also inherited the regiment's right to wear a red tie with the formal uniform. As part of the reform the battalion moved from Sacile to Orcenico Superiore and joined the 8th Mechanized Brigade "Garibaldi".

On 12 November 1976 the President of the Italian Republic Giovanni Leone assigned with decree 846 the flag and traditions of the 182nd Armored Infantry Regiment "Garibaldi" and the traditions of the XI Bersaglieri Cyclists Battalion to the battalion. The battalion consisted of a command, a command and services company, three mechanized companies with M113 armored personnel carriers, and a heavy mortar company with M106 mortar carriers with 120mm Mod. 63 mortars. At the time the battalion fielded 896 men (45 officers, 100 non-commissioned officers, and 751 soldiers).

For its conduct and work after the 1976 Friuli earthquake the battalion was awarded a Bronze Medal of Army Valor, which was affixed to the battalion's flag and is depicted on the battalion's coat of arms.

=== Recent times ===
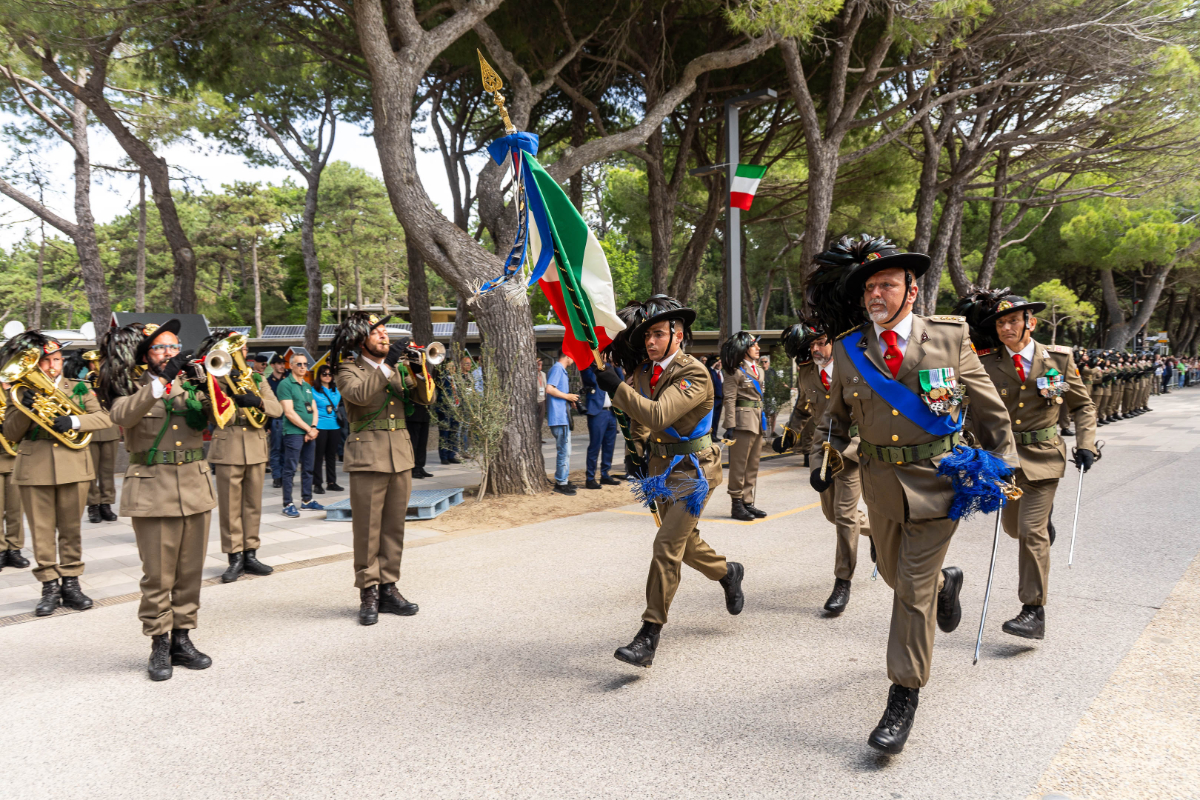
11th Bersaglieri Regiment war flag at the 73rd National Rally of the Bersaglieri

In 1991 the 8th Mechanized Brigade "Garibaldi" moved to the city of Caserta in the South of Italy and consequently on 16 May 1991 the 11th Bersaglieri Battalion "Caprera" moved from Orcenico Superiore to Bari. However, there the battalion was assigned to the Mechanized Brigade "Pinerolo" as replacement for the 67th Bersaglieri Battalion "Fagarè", which was transferred from the Mechanized Brigade "Pinerolo" to the 8th Bersaglieri Brigade "Garibaldi" on 1 July 1991.

On 19 October 1992 the 11th Bersaglieri Battalion "Caprera" lost its autonomy and the next day entered the reformed 7th Bersaglieri Regiment. As the regiment was in possession of its own flag, the flag of the 182nd Armored Infantry Regiment "Garibaldi", which had been in possession of the 11th Bersaglieri Battalion "Caprera" since 1976, was transferred to the Shrine of the Flags in the Vittoriano in Rome. The three silver medals of military valor, which had been awarded to the XI Bersaglieri Cyclists Battalion and had been affixed to the flag of the 182nd Infantry Regiment "Garibaldi" since 1964, were transferred to the flag of the 7th Bersaglieri Regiment, while the Gold Medal of Military Valor, which had been awarded to the 182nd Infantry Regiment "Garibaldi", remained affixed to the flag, which was deposited in the Shrine of the Flags. The Bronze Medal of Army Valor, which had been awarded to the battalion in 1976 was also affixed to the 7th Bersaglieri Regiment's flag. All four of the battalion's medals were also depicted on the regiment's coats of arms.

On 30 September 1992 the 11th Bersaglieri Regiment was reformed in Aviano. The regiment's sole battalion was the 27th Bersaglieri Battalion "Jamiano", which had been in possession of the flag of the 11th Bersaglieri Regiment since the 1975 army reform. On 18 April 1997 the 11th Bersaglieri Regiment's 27th Bersaglieri Battalion "Jamiano" was renamed 11th Bersaglieri Battalion "Caprera", thus reuniting the battalion with its regiment. Consequently, the battalion's three Silver Medals of Military Valor and its Bronze Medal of Army Valor were transferred from the flag of the 7th Bersaglieri Regiment to the flag of the 11th Bersaglieri Regiment, and the coats of arms of both regiments were updated.

With the return of the 11th Bersaglieri Battalion to the regiment, the tradition of the 182nd Armored Infantry Regiment "Garibaldi" to wear a red tie with the formal uniform passed to 11th Bersaglieri Regiment.

== See also ==
- Bersaglieri
