= 182nd Armored Infantry Regiment "Garibaldi" =

Inactive Italian Army infantry unit

- 182° Reggimento fanteria corazzato "Garibaldi"
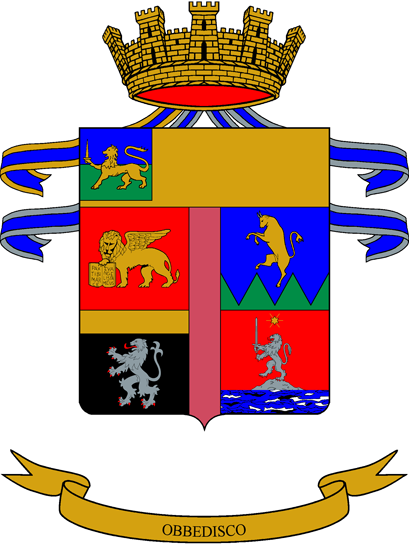
- Regimental coat of arms with the three temporarily assigned Silver Medals of Military Valor of the 11th Bersaglieri Battalion "Caprera"
- Active: 25 April 1945 – 15 July 1976
- Country: Italy
- Branch: Italian Army
- Part of: Infantry Division "Folgore"
- Garrison/HQ: Sacile
- Motto: "Obbedisco"
- Anniversaries: 12 October 1953 – Awarding of the Gold Medal of Military Valor
- Decorations: 1× Gold Medal of Military Valor; 3× Silver Medals of Military Valor^{*} * temporarily assigned

Insignia
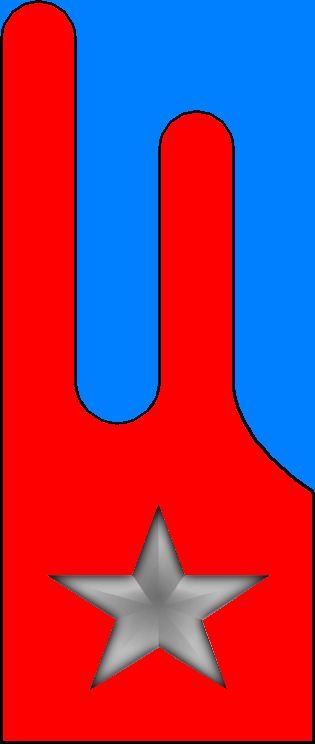
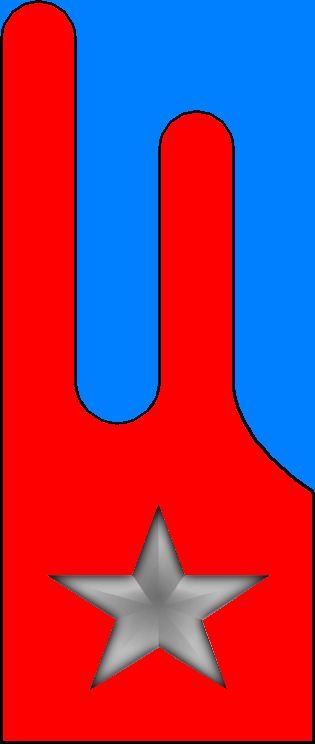
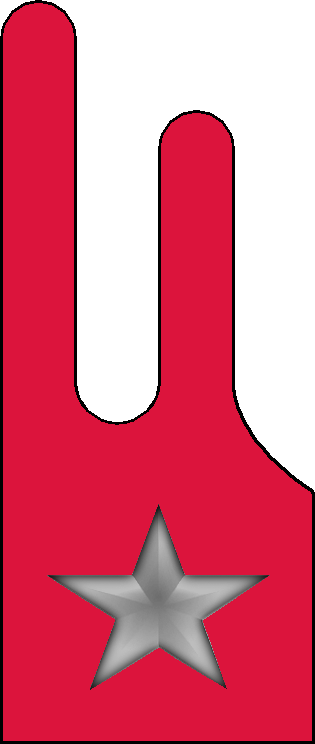
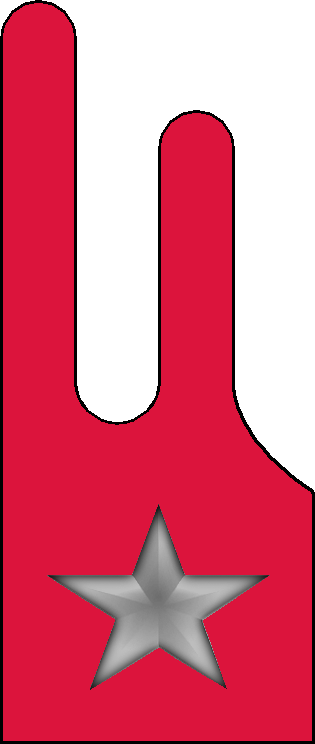
- Tank and Bersaglieri units gorget patches

The 182nd Armored Infantry Regiment "Garibaldi" (Italian: 182° Reggimento Fanteria Corazzato "Garibaldi") is an inactive unit of the Italian Army last based in Sacile in Friuli-Venezia Giulia. The regiment was part of the Italian Army's infantry arm and was last assigned to the Infantry Division "Folgore".

The regiment is an atypical unit of the Italian Army as it is the only infantry regiment formed after World War II and the only infantry regiment formed without a sister regiment. The regiment was formed in 1945 from partisan formations that had fought in Yugoslavia against German forces, for which the regiment was awarded Italy's highest military honor the Gold Medal of Military Valor. The regiment never received its own gorget patches and used initially the gorget patches of the Alpini troops, then the gorget patches of the 183rd Infantry Regiment "Nembo", and finally the Bersaglieri and tank units gorget patches. The regiment was disbanded in 1976 and its traditions assigned to the 11th Bersaglieri Battalion "Caprera", which in 1997 entered the 11th Bersaglieri Regiment. Since then the traditions of the 182nd Armored Infantry Regiment "Garibaldi" are preserved by the 11th Bersaglieri Regiment.

== History ==
On 25 April 1945 the Regiment "Garibaldi" was formed in Viterbo with repatriated survivors of the Italian partisan Division "Garibaldi", which had been formed on 2 December 1943 in Montenegro from the remnants of two Italian divisions, which had refused to surrender to German forces after the announcement of the Armistice of Cassibile on 8 September 1943.

=== Division "Garibaldi" ===
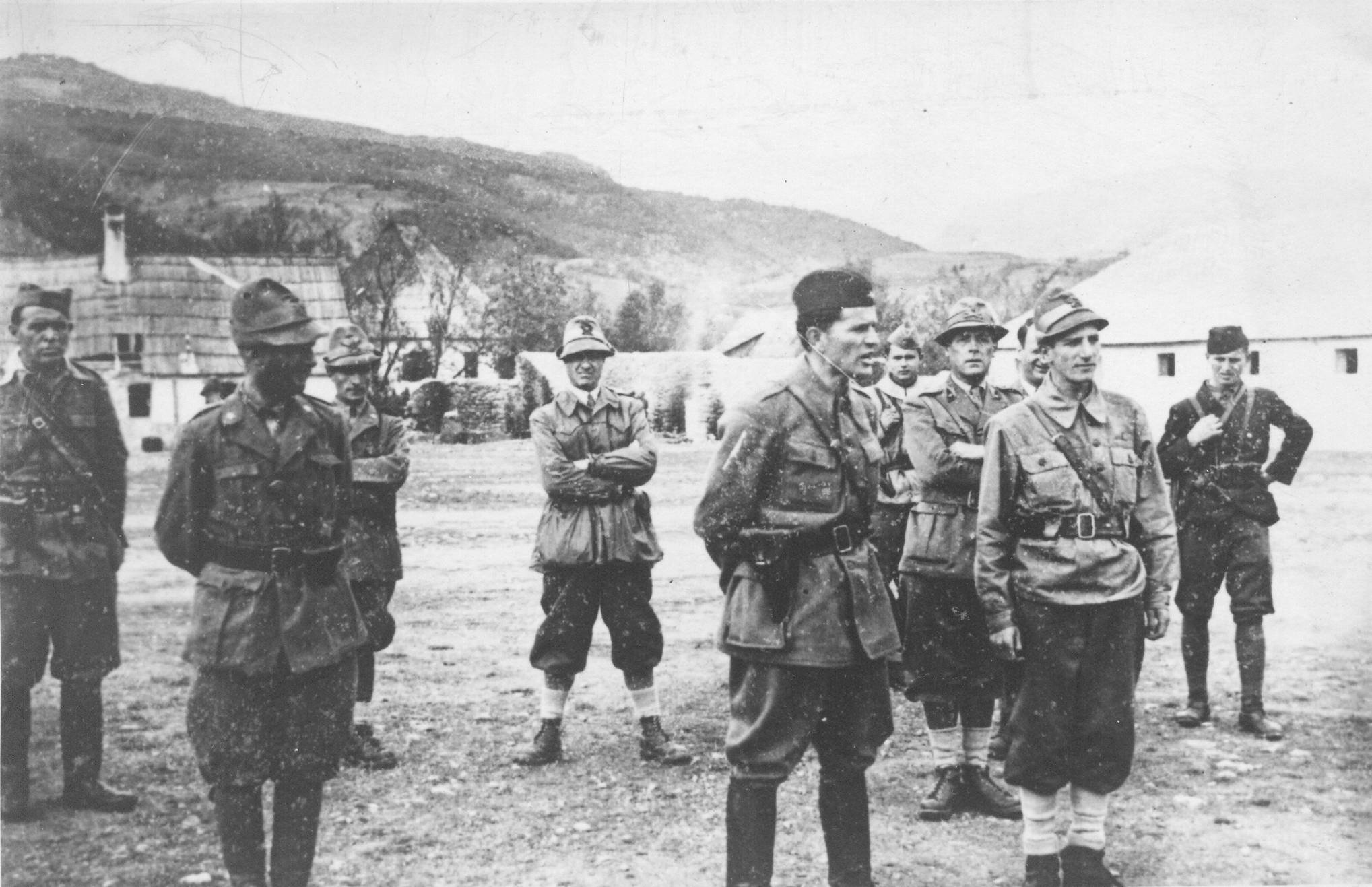
2nd Yugoslav Partisan Corps Commander Peko Dapčević addressing the men of the Mountain Artillery Group "Aosta" in September 1943

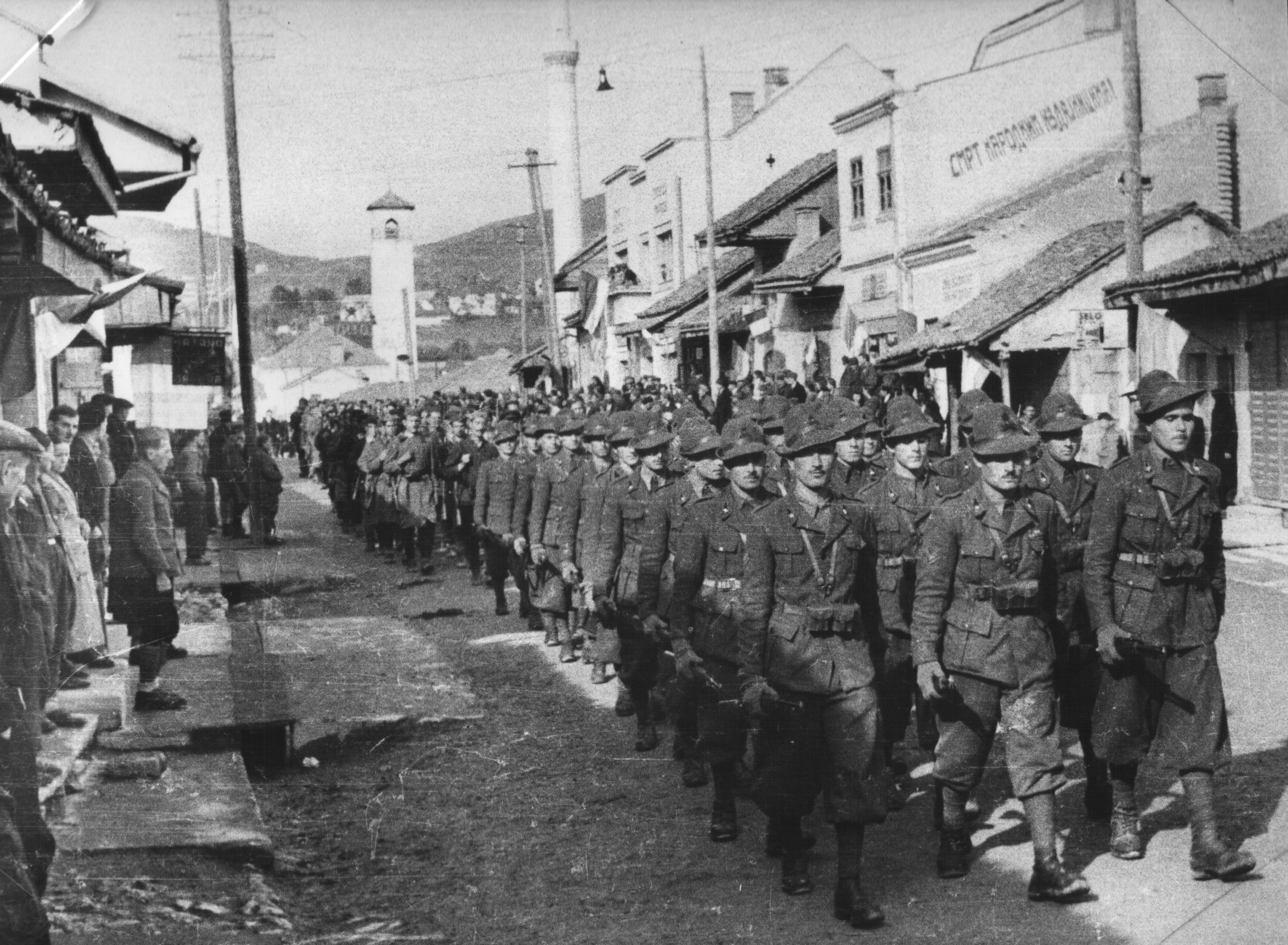
Alpini of the "Taurinense" in Pljevlja October 1943

The news of the armistice between Italy and the Allies reached the Italian XIV Army Corps in the evening of 8 September 1943 and due to the lack of any orders from Rome the four divisions of the corps reacted differently and individually to German demands to surrender: the 23rd Infantry Division "Ferrara" surrendered immediately. The 155th Infantry Division "Emilia" based around Kotor resisted the Germans until 16 September, but under heavy Luftwaffe air attacks chose evacuation by the Italian Regia Marina to Bari. The 19th Infantry Division "Venezia" based around Berane refused to surrender and allied with Yugoslav partisans. On 10 October the division entered the 2nd Corps of Tito's National Liberation Army and on 13 October 1943 the division began an offensive against Wehrmacht forces in Brodarevo, Murina, Berane and Kolašin. The 1st Alpine Division "Taurinense" based around Nikšić and Danilovgrad immediately attacked German positions and by sunrise of 9 September was fully engaged in combat with German forces. The division tried to reach Kotor to be evacuated, but in heavy combat lost about half its strength of 14,000 men. The division's Mountain Artillery Group "Aosta" of the 1st Mountain Artillery Regiment and Alpini Battalion "Ivrea" had ignored orders to move to Kotor and sided with Tito's forces right away. By early October the remnants of the Italian units, more than 20,000 men, retreated towards Pljevlja.

On 2 December 1943 in Pljevlja the remaining Italian soldiers, approximately 16,000 men, were grouped together in the Division "Garibaldi", which as unit insignia chose a red neckerchief in referral to Giuseppe Garibaldi's redshirt volunteers. The division consisted of three brigades of 5,000 men each, with the remaining Italians, mostly artillery, signals, engineer, and medical specialists, becoming instructors. Integrated into the Partisan 2nd Corps the division fought in Montenegro, Herzegovina, Bosnia, and Sandžak until February 1945, when the remaining 3,800 troops were repatriated via the liberated harbour of Dubrovnik.

The units, which entered the Division "Garibaldi" as coherent units, were awarded with Italy's highest military honor after their return:

- Mountain Artillery Group "Aosta" Gold Medal of Military Valor awarded on 13 January 1945
- 83rd Infantry Regiment "Venezia" Gold Medal of Military Valor awarded on 15 March 1950
- 84th Infantry Regiment "Venezia" Gold Medal of Military Valor awarded on 15 March 1950
- 19th Field Artillery Regiment "Venezia" Gold Medal of Military Valor awarded on 15 March 1950
- Alpini Battalion "Ivrea" Silver Medal of Military Valor awarded on 31 December 1947

=== Regiment "Garibaldi" ===
On 25 April 1945 the Regiment "Garibaldi" was formed in Viterbo with the survivors of the Division "Garibaldi". The brigades of the Division "Garibaldi" were reorganized as battalions, with battalions becoming companies and companies becoming platoons. After its formation the regiment consisted of the following units:

- Regiment "Garibaldi"
  - Command Company (former Escort Unit Division "Garibaldi")
  - I Battalion (former I Alpine Brigade – Group "Aosta")
  - II Battalion (former II Brigade "Venezia")
  - III Battalion (former IV Alpine Brigade "Garibaldi")
  - Mortar Company (with British ML 3 inch mortars; former Artillery Group "Venezia")
  - Anti-tank Company (with British QF 6-pounder anti-tank guns)

The Garibaldi regiment's troops wore the distinct Cappello Alpino of the Alpini infantry specialty. On 5 September 1945 the regiment joined the Combat Group "Folgore", which had participated on the allied side in the Italian Campaign. The Folgore had been formed on 25 September 1944 with troops from the 184th Infantry Division "Nembo", which had served with the Italian Liberation Corps in the battles of Filottrano, Castelfidardo, and Ancona. The Combat Group "Folgore" consisted of two regiments with three battalions each: the Paratroopers Regiment "Nembo" and the navy's Regiment "San Marco". The Paratroopers Regiment "Nembo" had been formed with the remnants of the five paratrooper battalions of the 184th Infantry Division "Nembo". The combat group also fielded the Artillery Regiment "Folgore". The same day the Regiment "Garibaldi" entered the Combat Group "Folgore" the Regiment "San Marco" left it and returned to the navy. 15 October 1945 the Combat Group "Folgore" was elevated to Infantry Division "Folgore". In 1946 the regiment moved from Viterbo to Florence.

=== 182nd Infantry Regiment "Garibaldi" ===
In 1947 the regiment moved from Florence to Pordenone. On 1 December 1948 the Regiment "Garibaldi" was renamed 182nd Infantry Regiment "Garibaldi", the Paratroopers Regiment "Nembo" was renamed 183rd Infantry Regiment "Nembo", and the Paratroopers Artillery Regiment "Folgore" was renamed 184th Artillery Regiment "Nembo". With the renaming the 182nd Garibaldi ceded its Alpini troops to the Alpini regiments that were forming and received infantry fusiliers instead. At the same time the regiment ceased to wear the Cappello Alpino and began to wear a red tie with the formal uniform. The regiment's new structure was:

- 182nd Infantry Regiment "Garibaldi"
  - Command Company
  - I Infantry Battalion
  - II Infantry Battalion
  - III Infantry Battalion
  - Mortar Company
  - Anti-tank Company

In 1949 the regiment moved from Pordenone to Sacile and on 12 October 1953 the infantry units of the Division "Garibaldi" were awarded Italy's highest military honor the Gold Medal of Military Valor for their conduct in Yugoslavia from September 1943 to April 1945.

=== 182nd Armored Infantry Regiment "Garibaldi" ===
On 31 October 1958 the regiment disbanded its infantry battalions and the next day the regiment received the I Bersaglieri Battalion and III Tank Battalion from the 1st Bersaglieri Regiment. On the same day the regiment was renamed 182nd Armored Infantry Regiment "Garibaldi". Upon entering the regiment the III Tank Battalion was renamed II Tank Battalion, but already on 1 February 1959 the battalion was renamed XXI Tank Battalion. On 11 April 1961 the XXI Tank Battalion was renamed XIII Tank Battalion and the I Bersaglieri Battalion was renamed XXIII Bersaglieri Battalion. On 24 September 1964 the XXIII Bersaglieri Battalion was renamed XI Bersaglieri Battalion. From 1964 onward regiment's structure was:

- 182nd Armored Infantry Regiment "Garibaldi", in Sacile
  - Command Company, in Sacile (includes an anti-tank guided missile platoon)
  - XI Bersaglieri Battalion, in Sacile (M113 armored personnel carriers)
  - XIII Tank Battalion, in Sacile (M47 Patton tanks)

With the arrival of the XI Bersaglieri Battalion the three Silver Medals of Military Valor awarded during World War I to the battalion's predecessor unit, the XI Bersaglieri Cyclists Battalion of the 11th Bersaglieri Regiment, were temporarily affixed to the flag of the 182nd Armored Infantry Regiment "Garibaldi" and added to the regiment's coat of arms. On 12 December 1968 the wearing of red ties with the formal uniform was officially sanctioned as perpetual tradition of the regiment.

=== 11th Bersaglieri Battalion "Caprera" ===
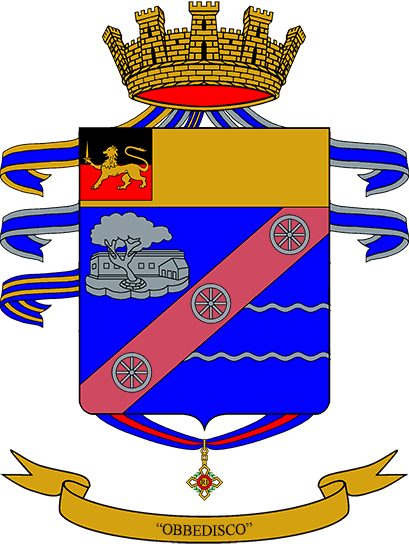
Coat of arms of the 11th Bersaglieri Battalion "Caprera" with the temporarily assigned Gold Medal of Military Valor of the 182nd Regiment "Garibaldi"

During the 1975 army reform the army disbanded the regimental level and newly independent battalions were granted for the first time their own flags. On 15 July 1976 the 182nd Armored Infantry Regiment "Garibaldi" became the last infantry regiment to disband and the next day its two battalions became autonomous units: the XI Bersaglieri Battalion was renamed 11th Bersaglieri Battalion "Caprera", while the XIII Tank Battalion was renamed 13th Tank Battalion "M.O. Pascucci". The flag, motto and traditions of the 182nd Armored Infantry Regiment "Garibaldi" were assigned to the 11th Bersaglieri Battalion "Caprera", while the name of the regiment was transferred to the 8th Mechanized Brigade "Garibaldi". The 11th Bersaglieri Battalion was named for the island of Caprera, where the regiment's namesake Giuseppe Garibaldi had spent the last years of his life. The battalion inherited the regiment's right to wear a red tie. moved from Sacile to Orcenico Superiore, and joined the 8th Mechanized Brigade "Garibaldi", while the 13th Pascucci moved to Cordenons and joined the Mechanized Brigade "Brescia".

The Gold Medal of Military Valor awarded to the 182nd Infantry Regiment "Garibaldi" was temporarily assigned to the 11th Bersaglieri Battalion "Caprera", and thus remained affixed to the battalion's flag given and is depicted on the battalion's coat of arms.

On 20 October 1992 the 11th Bersaglieri Battalion "Caprera" lost its autonomy and the next day entered the reformed 7th Bersaglieri Regiment. As the regiment was in possession of its own flag, the flag of the 182nd Armored Infantry Regiment "Garibaldi", which had been in possession of the 11th Bersaglieri Battalion "Caprera" since 1976, was transferred to the Shrine of the Flags in the Vittoriano in Rome. The three silver medals of military valor, which had been awarded to the XI Bersaglieri Cyclists Battalion and had been affixed to the flag of the 182nd Infantry Regiment "Garibaldi" since 1964, were transferred to the flag of the 7th Bersaglieri Regiment, while the Gold Medal of Military Valor, which had been awarded to the 182nd Infantry Regiment "Garibaldi", remained affixed to the flag deposited in the Shrine of the Flags.

== Regimental traditions ==
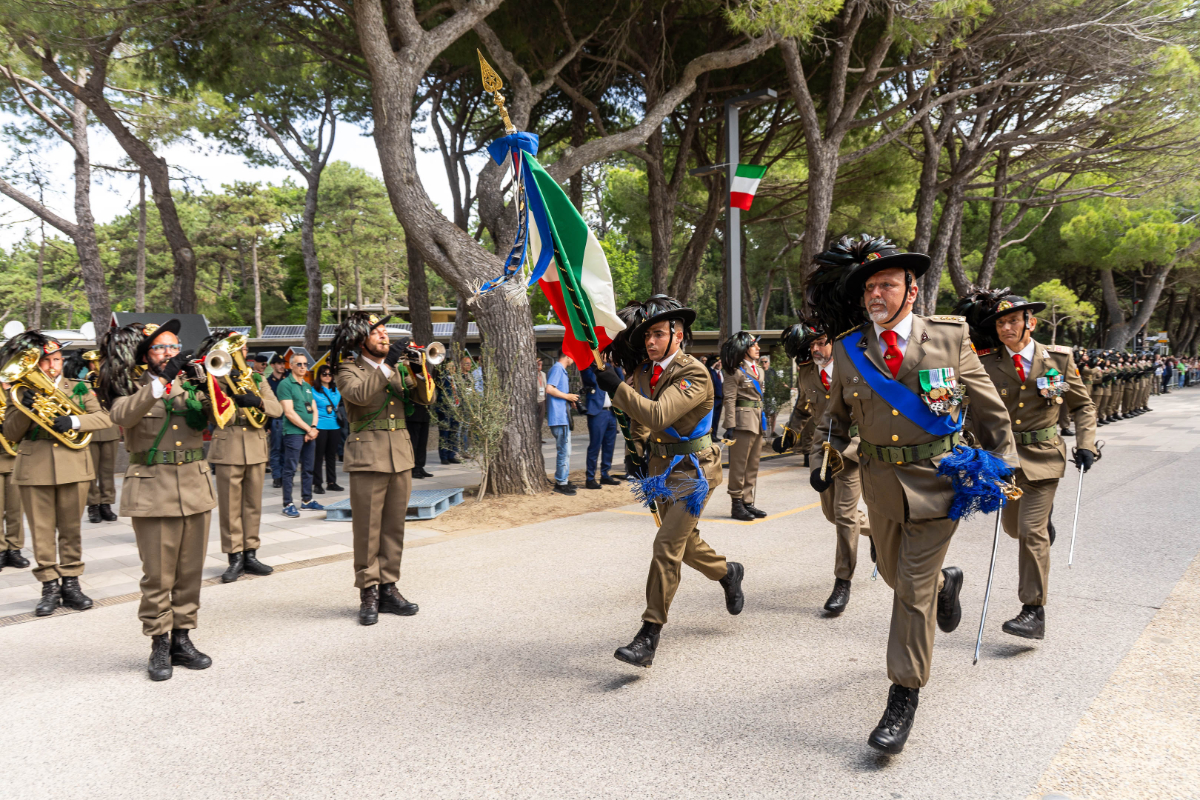
11th Bersaglieri Regiment flag at the 73rd National Rally of the Bersaglieri

The 182nd regiment was a unique unit with distinct traditions, not shared with any other Italian Army unit. Italian infantry regiments have always been raised in pairs with consecutive numbers and the same name, however as there never was a 181st Infantry Regiment, the 182nd Infantry Regiment is the only solitary infantry regiment of the Italian Army. The 182nd Regiment was also the only regiment named after a person. All Italian infantry regiments received unique gorget patches, which they only shared with their sister regiment, while the 182nd is the only infantry regiment, which never received its own gorget patches: from its founding until 1 December 1948 the regiment wore the gorget patches of the Alpini corps, and after 1 December 1948 the regiment wore the gorget patches of the 183rd Infantry Regiment "Nembo", which were a modified version of the paratroopers gorget patches. After it was reformed as an armored infantry regiment the members of the regiment wore either the gorget patches of the Bersaglieri speciality and or the tankers speciality.

== See also ==
- Giuseppe Garibaldi
