= 2nd Bersaglieri Regiment =

Inactive Italian Army infantry unit

- 2° Reggimento bersaglieri
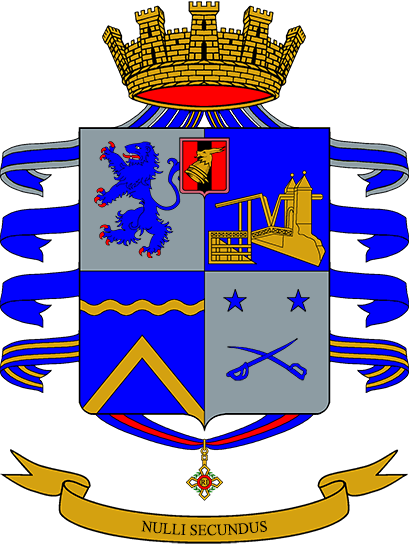
- Regimental coat of arms
- Active: 16 April 1861 — 8 Sept. 1943; 31 Oct. 1975 - 2 Sept. 2002
- Country: Italy
- Branch: Italian Army
- Part of: Armored Brigade "Centauro"
- Garrison/HQ: Legnano
- Motto: "Nulli Secundus"
- Anniversaries: 18 June 1836
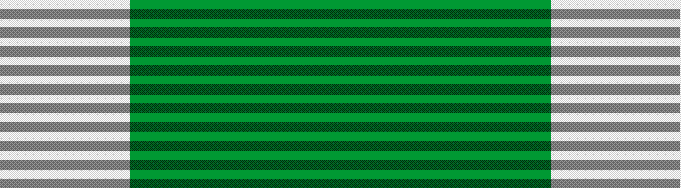
- Decorations: 2x Military Order of Italy; 2x Silver Medals of Military Valor; 4x Bronze Medals of Military Valor; 1x Silver Medal of Army Valor; 1x Bronze Medal of Army Valor; 1x Silver Medal of Merit

Insignia
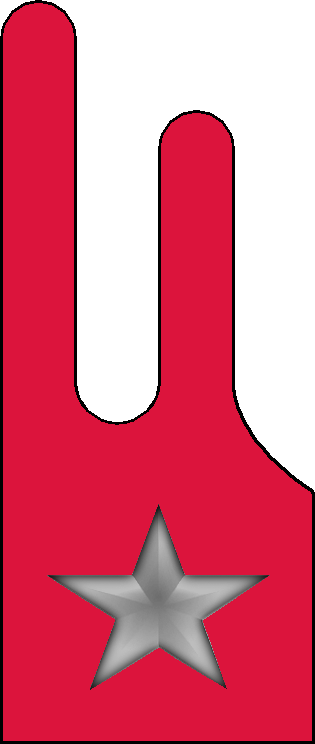
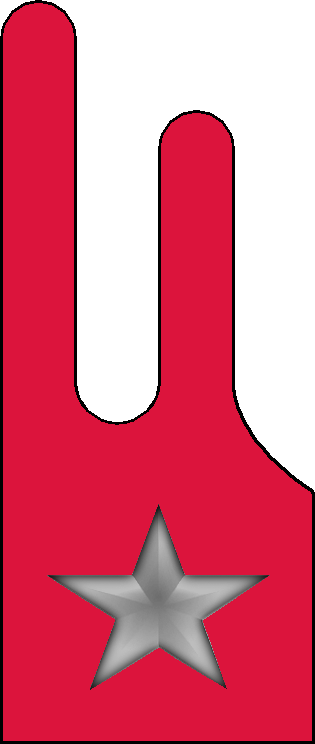
- Bersaglieri gorget patches

The 2nd Bersaglieri Regiment (Italian: 2° Reggimento Bersaglieri) is an inactive unit of the Italian Army last based in Legnano in Lombardy. The regiment is part of the army's infantry corps' Bersaglieri speciality and was last operationally assigned to the Armored Brigade "Centauro". The regiment was formed in 1861 by the Royal Italian Army with preexisting battalions. During World War I the regiment served on the Italian front.

During World War II the regiment fought in the Greco–Italian War and then served on occupation duty in Albania and Greece. In 1976 the regiment's flag and traditions were assigned to the 2nd Bersaglieri Battalion "Governolo". On 2 September 2002 the regiment was disbanded and its flag transferred to the Shrine of the Flags in the Vittoriano in Rome. The regiment's anniversary falls, as for all Bersaglieri units, on 18 June 1836, the day the Bersaglieri speciality was founded.

== History ==
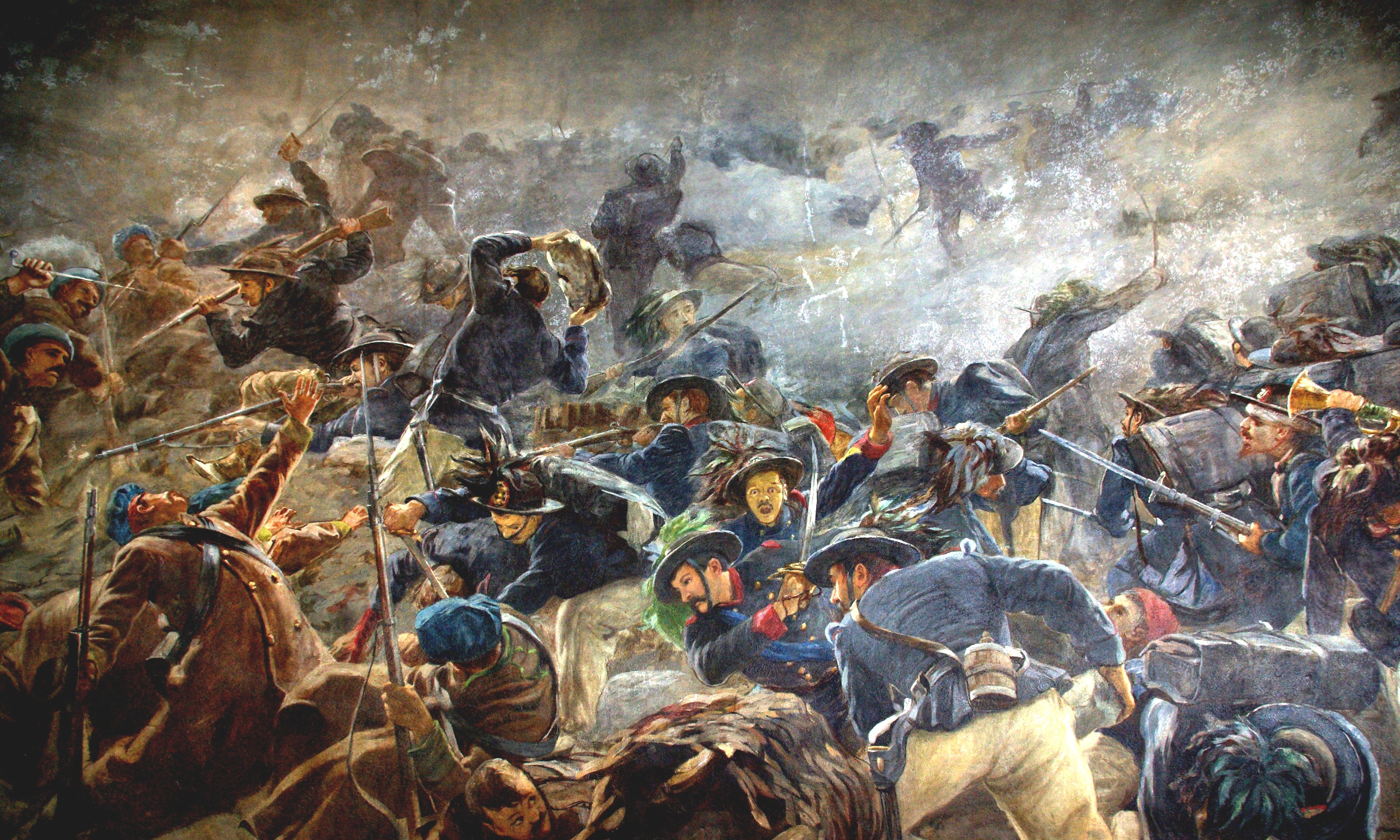
Bersaglieri halt the Russian advance during the Battle of the Chernaya in Crimea in 1855

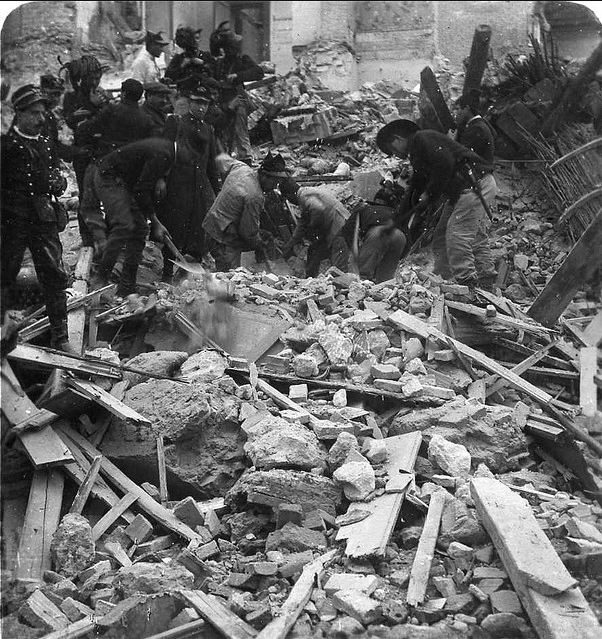
Bersaglieri search for survivors after the 1908 Messina earthquake

On 16 April 1861 the 2nd Army Corps Bersaglieri Command was formed in Como and assigned to the II Army Corps. The command had purely administrative functions and consisted of the preexisting II, IV, VIII, X, XV, and XVII battalions, and the II Bersaglieri Depot Battalion. On 31 December 1861 the command was renamed 2nd Bersaglieri Regiment, but continued to exert only administrative functions. On 18 December 1864 the Bersaglieri regiments were reduced from six to five and consequently the 4th Bersaglieri Regiment was disbanded and its XI Battalion transferred to the 2nd Bersaglieri Regiment. In 1865 the regiment formed the XXXVII Battalion and now consisted of eight battalions. In 1866, in preparation for the Third Italian War of Independence, the regiment formed the XLII Battalion, which was disbanded in December 1870.

On 1 January 1871 the 2nd Bersaglieri Regiment was reorganized as an operational regiment with the II Battalion, IV Battalion, XVII Battalion, and XXXVII Battalion, while the VIII Battalion, X Battalion, XI Battalion, and XV Battalion were transferred to the newly formed 7th Bersaglieri Regiment. The four remaining battalions were renumbered as I, II, III, and IV battalion. On 16 September 1883 the IV Battalion was disbanded. On 18 June 1886, all Bersaglieri battalions resumed their original numbering and afterwards the 2nd Bersaglieri Regiment consisted of the II Battalion, IV Battalion, and XVII Battalion.

The II Battalion had been formed by the Royal Sardinian Army in 1848 and included the 2nd Company, which had been formed in January 1837 and was the Bersaglieri speciality's second-oldest company. In 1848 the battalion fought in the First Italian War of Independence, during which the battalion fought in the Battle of Santa Lucia, Battle of Goito and the Second Battle of Governolo. On 6 May 1848, during the Battle of Santa Lucia, the II Battalion's 4th Company distinguished itself fighting inside the walls of the city of Verona. For this the 4th Company was awarded a Bronze Medal of Military Valor, which was affixed to the flag of the 2nd Bersaglieri Regiment and added to the regiment's coat of arms, when the battalion joined the regiment. On 18 July 1848, during the Second Battle of Governolo, the II Battalion's 2nd Company distinguished itself and was awarded a Bronze Medal of Military Valor, which was affixed to the flag of the 2nd Bersaglieri Regiment and added to the regiment's coat of arms, when the battalion joined the regiment. In 1849 the Royal Sardinian Army formed the IV Battalion, which fought, together with the II Battalion, in the Battle of Novara. During this battle the IV Battalion's 14th Company distinguished itself and was awarded a Bronze Medal of Military Valor, which was affixed to the flag of the 2nd Bersaglieri Regiment and added to the regiment's coat of arms, when the battalion joined the regiment.

In 1855 the II Battalion's 5th and 6th companies were assigned to the I Provisional Bersaglieri Battalion, while the IV Battalion's 13th and 14th companies were assigned to the II Provisional Bersaglieri Battalion. The two provisional battalions were part of the Sardinian Expeditionary Corps, which fought in the Crimean War. The two battalions fought in the Battle of the Chernaya and the Siege of Sevastopol. In 1859, during the Second Italian War of Independence, II and IV battalions fought in the Battle of Solferino. On 15 April 1860 the Royal Sardinian Army formed the XVII Battalion with volunteers, who had fought in the Second Italian War of Independence.

In 1866 the battalions participated in the Third Italian War of Independence, during which the II Battalion distinguished itself in the Battle of Custoza. For its conduct at Custoza the battalion was awarded a Bronze Medal of Military Valor, which was affixed to the flag of the 2nd Bersaglieri Regiment and added to the regiment's coat of arms. In September 1870 the XVII Battalion participated in the capture of Rome. In 1895-96 the regiment provided 13 officers and 278 troops to help form the I, III, V, and VI provisional battalions, which were deployed to Eritrea for the First Italo-Ethiopian War. In 1900-01 the regiment's 11th Company, along with companies of the 4th Bersaglieri Regiment, 5th Bersaglieri Regiment, and 8th Bersaglieri Regiment, was assigned to a provisional Bersaglieri battalion, which served with the Eight-Nation Alliance in China during the Boxer Rebellion. In December 1908 the regiment was deployed to the area of the Strait of Messina for the recovery efforts after the 1908 Messina earthquake. For its service the regiment was awarded a Silver Medal of Merit, which was affixed to the regiment's flag. On 1 October 1910 the regiment's depot in Rome formed the II Cyclists Battalion. In 1911, the regiment provided 22 officers and 899 troops to augment units fighting in the Italo-Turkish War.

=== World War I ===
At the outbreak of World War I the regiment consisted of the II, IV, and XVII battalions and the II Cyclists Battalion, which operated as an autonomous unit throughout the war. In January 1915 the depot of the 2nd Bersaglieri Regiment in Rome formed the LIII and LIV battalions. In February 1915, the regiment's II Battalion departed for Italian Libya and consequently the LIII Battalion joined the regiment as II bis Battalion. On 5 January 1916 the II bis Battalion resumed to be numbered LIII Battalion. The LIV Battalion operated as an autonomous unit until 11 March 1916.

On 24 May 1915, the day after Italy's entry into the war, the regiment occupied the Cereda Pass in the Dolomites. In August and September 1915 the regiment repeatedly attacked Austro-Hungarian positions on Monte Coston. On 11 March 1916 the regiment's depot in Rome formed the regimental command of the 14th Bersaglieri Regiment and the LXI Battalion for the new regiment. Already on 2 January 1916 the depot of the 3rd Bersaglieri Regiment in Livorno had formed the XL Battalion for the new regiment, which also received the LIV Battalion, which had operated as an autonomous unit until then. The same month the 2nd Bersaglieri Regiment was transferred from the Dolomites front to Bovec on the Isonzo front, where the regiment occupied the Italian lines on Mount Ravni Laz. In January 1917 the regimental depot in Rome formed the LXIV Battalion for the 17th Bersaglieri Regiment. The same year the depot also formed the XXVI Assault Unit, which was part of the Arditi shock troops.

On 23 October 1917 the regiment took up positions in Selišče. The next day, 24 October 1917, the Austro-Hungarian Army and Imperial German Army commenced the Battle of Caporetto. On 25 October the regiment began to retreat towards along the Isonzo river, but found all the bridges had been destroyed. Finally at Trnovo ob Soči the regiment found a bridge, which was on fire and only the regimental command and one company of the IV Battalion managed to cross before the bridge fell into the river. The remainder of the regiment, two and a half battalions strong, was forced to surrender to the Austro-Hungarian troops. A total of 42 officers and 2,089 troops were taken prisoner. The remnants of the regiment retreated towards the new Piave river front. On 17 November 1917 the remaining troops of the 9th Bersaglieri Regiment were transferred to the 4th Bersaglieri Regiment to bring the regiment back up to strength.

In June 1918 the regiment fought on the Montello during the Second Battle of the Piave River. On 29 August 1918 the regiment formed, together with the 3rd Bersaglieri Regiment, the VII Bersaglieri Brigade. On 24 October 1918 Italy commenced the Battle of Vittorio Veneto and in the afternoon of the 27 October the VI and VII Bersaglieri brigades crossed the Piave river South of the island of Grave di Papadopoli. On 30 October the VII brigade attacked towards Oderzo and from there rapidly advanced to San Vito al Tagliamento in pursuit of the fleeing Austro-Hungarian armies. On 4 November the 2nd Bersaglieri Regiment reached Flambruzzo, where the regiment was informed of the end of the war.

During the war the regiment's II Cyclists Battalion fought as an autonomous unit. In 1915 the battalion was deployed on the Isonzo front. In November the battalion fought in the Fourth Battle of the Isonzo at Oslavia. In January 1916 the battalion again fought at Oslavia. On 15 May 1916, Austro-Hungary commenced the Battle of Asiago. Four days later the battalion was transferred as reinforcements to the Asiago plateau. On 1 June the battalion arrived at Zaibena and began to fortify the line. On 10 June the battalion was ferociously attacked by enemy forces, but held the line. After the front on the Asiago plateau had stabilized the battalion was transferred back to the Izono front for the Sixth Battle of the Isonzo, during which the battalion, together with the regiments of the Brigade "Lombardia", conquered and held the summit of Nad Logem. In May 1917, during the Tenth Battle of the Isonzo the battalion fought on the Monte Santo di Gorizia. In August and September 1917 the battalion was deployed again on the Monte Santo during the Eleventh Battle of the Isonzo.

After the Battle of Caporetto the battalion fought a delaying action at the bridge over the Torre river at Nimis, and then at San Daniele del Friuli. On 5 November the battalion fought against advancing enemy forces at the bridge over the Meduna river at Navarons. The battalion then retreated to Poffabro and from there via Longarone, Belluno, Feltre and Bassano del Grappa to Rossano Veneto, where the battalion stopped to be reorganized. On 24 November the battalion entered the new front along the Piave river at Fagarè. In June 1918 the battalion fought in the Second Battle of the Piave River at Fossalta di Piave. On 24 June 1918 the II, VI, IX, and X Cyclists battalions were disbanded and their remaining personnel merged into a single Cyclists Assault Battalion. For its service at Oslavia, at Zaibena, on Nad Logem, and on the Monte Santo the II Cyclists Battalion was awarded a Silver Medal of Military Valor, which was affixed to the flag of the 2nd Bersaglieri Regiment and added to the regiment's coat of arms.

=== Interwar years ===
After the war the LIII Battalion was disbanded and the II Battalion returned from Libya. In 1920 the XVII Battalion was first reduced to a reserve unit and then disbanded. In July 1924 the regiment became a cyclists unit. By 1926 the regiment consisted of the II and IV battalions, and a depot. On 11 March 1932 the regiment formed a motorized unit, which consisted of four platoons of Bersaglieri on motorcycles. In October 1933 the unit was renamed Bersaglieri Motorcyclists Company. The company was disbanded on 1 February 1934. In 1935-36 248 troops of the regiment were assigned to other units for the Second Italo-Ethiopian War. In April 1936 the regiment lost its role as cyclists unit and the XVII Battalion was reformed as a motorcycle machine gunners unit, while the IV Battalion became an auto-transported unit. In September 1937 the XVII Battalion was redesigned XVII Motorcyclists Battalion. On 7 April 1939 the regimental command and the II Battalion participated in the Invasion of Albania.

=== World War II ===
At the outbreak of World War II the consisted of the following units:

- 2nd Bersaglieri Regiment
  - Command Company
  - II Battalion
  - IV Battalion
  - XVII Battalion
  - 2nd Motorcyclists Company
  - 2nd Cannons Company, with 47/32 mod. 35 anti-tank guns

On 4 November 1940 the regiment was sent to Albania to fight in the Greco-Italian War. Initially the regiment was deployed in the area of Delvinaki, but within days had to retreat to Ktismata. The regiment remained on the frontline until April 1941, when the German invasion of Greece forced Greek forces to retreat South. On 23 April 1941, when the regiment was taken out of the front, the fighting had reduced it to only 13.4% of its initial strength. For its service in Albania and Greece the 2nd Bersaglieri Regiment was awarded a Silver Medal of Military Valor, which was affixed to the regiment's flag and added to the regiment's coat of arms.

After the regiment had been rebuilt and it was sent to the island of Euboea in Greece on occupation duty. On 8 September 1943, the day the Armistice of Cassibile was announced, the regimental command and XVII Battalion were in Chalcis and quickly overcome by invading German forces. The remainder of the regiment's units were disarmed and disbanded by the Germans in the following days.

=== Cold War ===
On 24 May 1961 the II Bersaglieri Battalion was reformed as a mechanized unit of the 4th Armored Infantry Regiment, which was assigned to the Infantry Division "Legnano". During the 1975 army reform the army disbanded the regimental level and newly independent battalions were granted for the first time their own flags. On 30 October 1975 the 4th Armored Infantry Regiment was disbanded and the next day the regiment's II Bersaglieri Battalion in Legnano became an autonomous unit and was renamed 2nd Bersaglieri Battalion "Governolo". The battalion was named for the Second Battle of Governolo, where the II Battalion had distinguished itself during the First Italian War of Independence. The battalion was assigned to the Mechanized Brigade "Legnano" and consisted of a command, a command and services company, three mechanized companies with M113 armored personnel carriers, and a heavy mortar company with M106 mortar carriers with 120mm Mod. 63 mortars. The battalion fielded now 896 men (45 officers, 100 non-commissioned officers, and 751 soldiers).

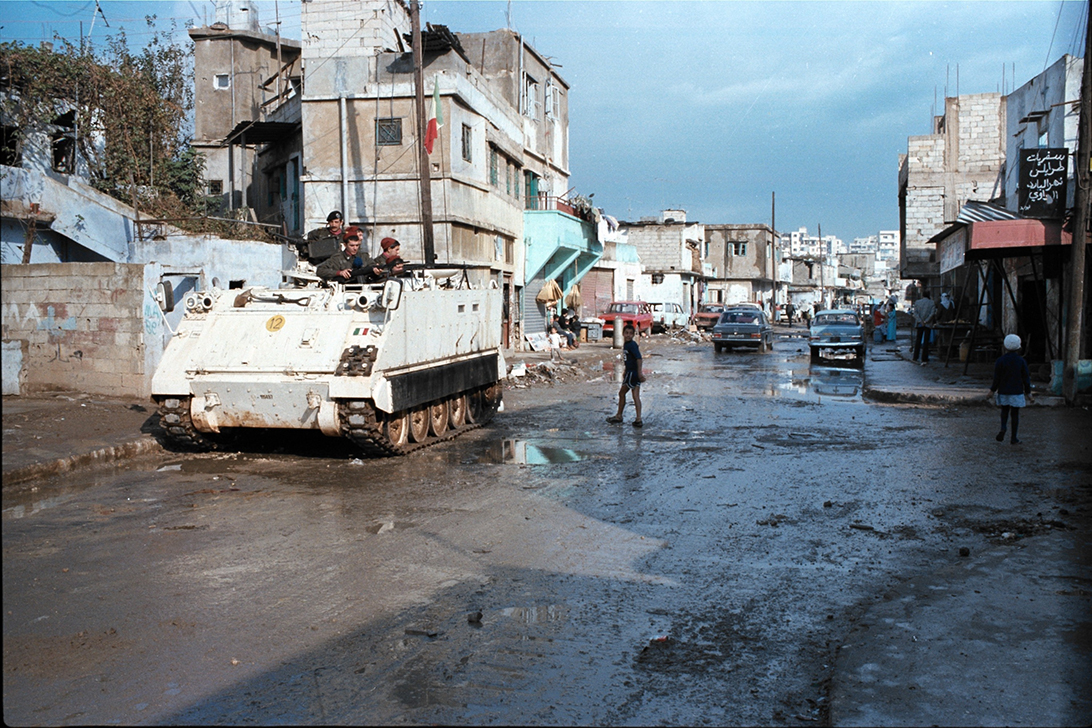
2nd Bersaglieri Battalion "Governolo" troops in Lebanon in 1982

On 12 November 1976 the President of the Italian Republic Giovanni Leone assigned with decree 846 the flag and traditions of the 2nd Bersaglieri Regiment to the battalion. For its conduct and work after the 1980 Irpinia earthquake the battalion was awarded a Bronze Medal of Army Valor, which was affixed to the battalion's flag and is depicted on the battalion's coats of arms.

From 23 August to 12 September 1982 the battalion was deployed to Beirut in Lebanon, where it was assigned, together with the U.S. Marines Corps' 2nd Battalion, 8th Marines and the French Army's 2nd Foreign Parachute Regiment to the Multinational Force in Lebanon, which was tasked with securing Beirut's port through which the troops of the PLO would evacuate Lebanon by ship. Already on 26 September the battalion, now reinforced by a provisional company of the 18th Bersaglieri Battalion "Poggio Scanno", returned to Beirut to guard initially the Bourj el-Barajneh refugee camp and then the Shatila refugee camp. At the end of February 1983 the battalion was relieved by the 10th Bersaglieri Battalion "Bezzecca" and the last elements of the 2nd Bersaglieri Battalion "Governolo" returned to Legnano on 24 March 1983. For its two deployments to Lebanon the battalion was awarded a Military Order of Italy, which was affixed to the battalion's flag.

=== Recent times ===
On 25 June 1992 the 2nd Bersaglieri Battalion "Governolo" lost its autonomy and the next day the battalion entered the reformed 2nd Bersaglieri Regiment. Between 26 June and 13 October 1993 the 2nd Bersaglieri Regiment served with the United Nations Operation in Somalia II, for which it was awarded a Silver Medal of Army Valor, which was affixed to the regiment's flag and added to the regiment's coat of arms. On 14 September 1996 the regiment was transferred from the Mechanized Brigade "Legnano" to the Armored Brigade "Centauro". On 2 September 2002 the 2nd Bersaglieri Regiment was disbanded the regiment's flag transferred to the Shrine of the Flags in the Vittoriano in Rome.

== See also ==
- Bersaglieri
