= 13th Tank Battalion "M.O. Pascucci" =

Inactive Italian Army tank unit

- 13° Battaglione Carri "M.O. Pascucci"
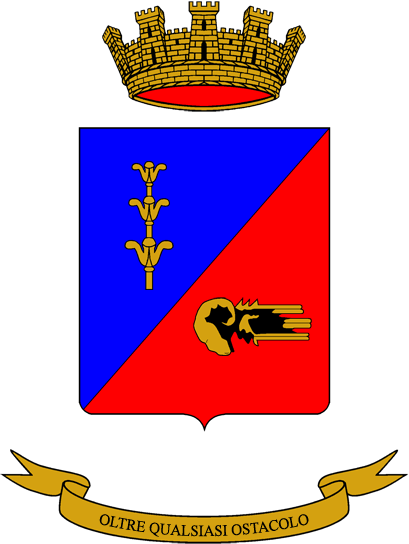
- Battalion coat of arms
- Active: 28 Aug. 1941 — 8 Dec. 1942; 11 April 1961 — 31 March 1991
- Country: Italy
- Branch: Italian Army
- Part of: 132nd Armored Brigade "Ariete"
- Garrison/HQ: Cordenons
- Motto(s): "Oltre qualsiasi ostacolo"
- Anniversaries: 1 October 1927

Insignia
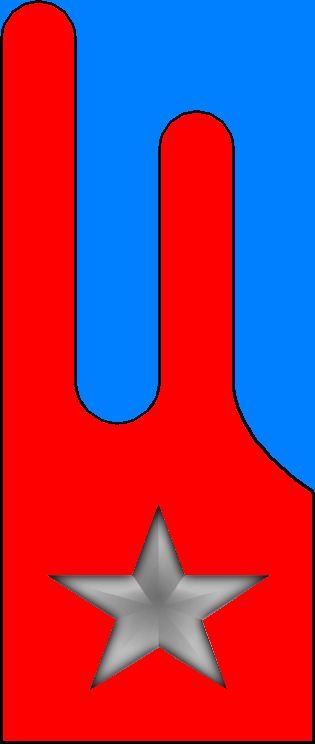
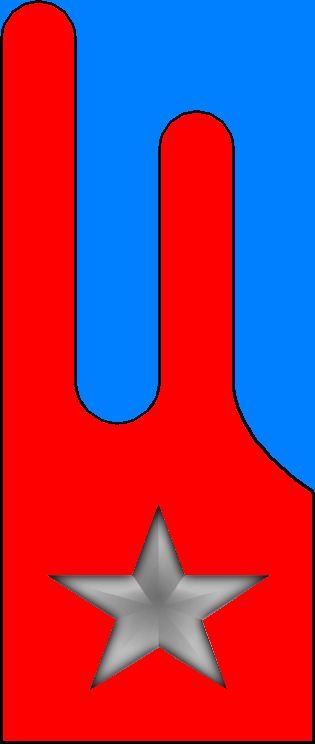
- Tank units gorget patches

The 13th Tank Battalion "M.O. Pascucci" (Italian: 13° Battaglione Carri "M.O. Pascucci") is an inactive tank battalion of the Italian Army, which was based in Cordenons in Friuli-Venezia Giulia and last operationally assigned to the 132nd Armored Brigade "Ariete". The unit's lineage traces back to the World War II XIII Tank Battalion M13/40, which was formed in 1941 by the depot of the 32nd Tank Infantry Regiment. In August 1942, the battalion was assigned to the 132nd Tank Infantry Regiment, with which it participated in the Western Desert campaign. The battalion fought in the Battle of Alam el Halfa and the Second Battle of El Alamein, during which the battalion was destroyed on 4 November by the British Army's 7th Armoured Division. In 1960, the battalion was reformed and assigned to the 182nd Armored Infantry Regiment "Garibaldi". In 1976, the battalion was renamed 13th Tank Battalion "M.O. Pascucci". In September 1989, the battalion was reduced to reserve unit and in 1991 the battalion was disbanded and its flag transferred to the Shrine of the Flags in the Vittoriano in Rome.

Originally the unit, like all Italian tank units, was part of the army's infantry arm, but on 1 June 1999 the tankers specialty was transferred from the infantry arm to the cavalry arm. The battalion's anniversary falls, as for all tank units, which have not yet distinguished themselves in the battle, on 1 October 1927, the day the tankers speciality was founded.

== History ==
=== World War II ===
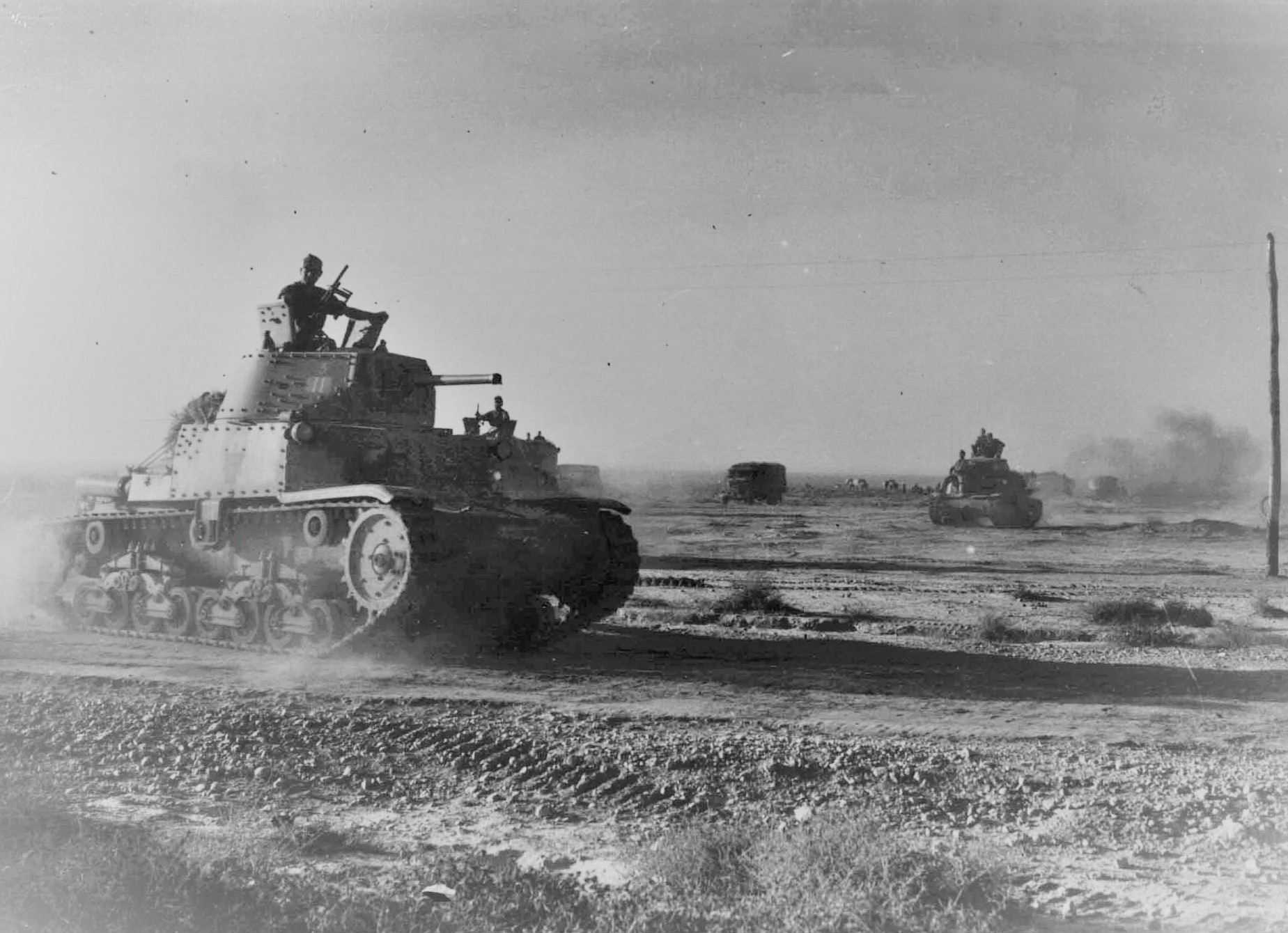
Ariete M13/40 tanks on the move in the Western Desert in 1942

On 28 August 1941, the depot of the 32nd Tank Infantry Regiment in Verona formed the XIII Tank Battalion M13/40 (with M standing for Italian: "Medio" or Medium). The battalion was equipped with M13/40 tanks. On 21 November 1941, the battalion was assigned to the 31st Tank Infantry Regiment. In July 1942, the XIII Tank Battalion M13/40 was ordered to move to Libya, where it was assigned in early August to the 132nd Tank Infantry Regiment of the 132nd Armored Division "Ariete" as replacement for the VIII Tank Battalion M13/40, which had been disbanded in July due to the heavy losses it had suffered in the First Battle of El Alamein.

From 30 August to 5 September 1942, the battalion participated in the Battle of Alam el Halfa, during which the 132nd Tank Infantry Regiment was heavily engaged at El Qattara. On 23 October 1942, the Second Battle of El Alamein commenced during which the 132nd Tank Infantry Regiment clashed repeatedly with British armored formations. On 4 November 1942, the 132nd Armored Division "Ariete" was encircled by the British Army's 7th Armoured Division and annihilated. On 20 November 1942, the 132nd Tank Infantry Regiment was declared lost due to wartime events, while the XIII Tank Battalion M13/40 was declared lost due to wartime events on 8 December 1942.

=== Cold War ===
On 11 April 1961, the XXI Tank Battalion of the 182nd Armored Infantry Regiment "Garibaldi" was renamed XIII Tank Battalion. The battalion was based in Sacile and equipped with M47 Patton tanks.

During the 1975 army reform the army disbanded the regimental level and newly independent battalions were granted for the first time their own flags, respectively in the case of cavalry units, their own standard. On 15 July 1976, the XIII Tank Battalion was renamed 13th Tank Battalion "M.O. Pascucci". As part of the reform tank and armored battalions were named for officers, soldiers and partisans of the tank speciality, who had served in World War II and been awarded Italy's highest military honor the Gold Medal of Military Valor. The 13th Tank Battalion was named for Lieutenant Luigi Arbib Pascucci, who, as commanding officer of the 10th Company of the XIII Tank Battalion M13/40, was killed in action on 5 November 1942 during the Second Battle of El Alamein.

The battalion was assigned to the Mechanized Brigade "Brescia" and consisted of a command, a command and services company, and three tank companies with M47 Patton tanks. The battalion fielded now 434 men (32 officers, 82 non-commissioned officers, and 320 soldiers). In 1976, the battalion moved from Sacile to Cordenons. On 12 November 1976, the President of the Italian Republic Giovanni Leone granted with decree 846 the 13th Tank Battalion "M.O. Pascucci" its flag. In 1977, the battalion replaced its M47 Patton tanks with Leopard 1A2 main battle tanks.

In 1986, the Italian Army abolished the divisional level and brigades, which until then had been under one of the Army's four divisions, came forthwith under direct command of the Army's 3rd Army Corps or 5th Army Corps. As part of the reform the Mechanized Brigade "Brescia" was transferred from the disbanding Mechanized Division "Mantova" to the 3rd Army Corps. However, as the 13th Tank Battalion "M.O. Pascucci" was based in the area of operations of the 5th Army Corps, the battalion was transferred on 1 August 1986 from the Mechanized Brigade "Brescia" to the 132nd Armored Brigade "Manin" of the Armored Division "Ariete". As the latter division carried a historically significant name, the Armored Division "Ariete" ceased to exist on 30 September 1975 in Pordenone, and the next day in the same location the 132nd Armored Brigade "Ariete" was activated. The new brigade then took command of the units of the 132nd Armored Brigade "Manin", whose name was stricken from the roll of active units of the Italian Army.

=== Recent times ===
After the end of the Cold War Italian Army began to draw down its forces and, on 5 December 1989, the flag of the 13th Tank Battalion "M.O. Pascucci" was transferred to the Shrine of the Flags in the Vittoriano in Rome. Five day later, on 10 December 1989, the battalion was reduced to a reserve unit, which was attached to the 63rd Tank Battalion "M.O. Fioritto" of the Mechanized Brigade "Mantova". On 31 March 1991, the 13th Tank Battalion "M.O. Pascucci" was disbanded.

== See also ==
- Armored Brigade "Ariete"
