= Cereda Pass =

- Location within Alps
- Elevation: 1,361 metres (4,465 ft)
- Traversed by: Dolomite Highway 2

Third Approach
- Location: Trentino/Province of Belluno, Italy
- Range: Dolomites
- Coordinates: 46°11′11″N 11°52′43″E

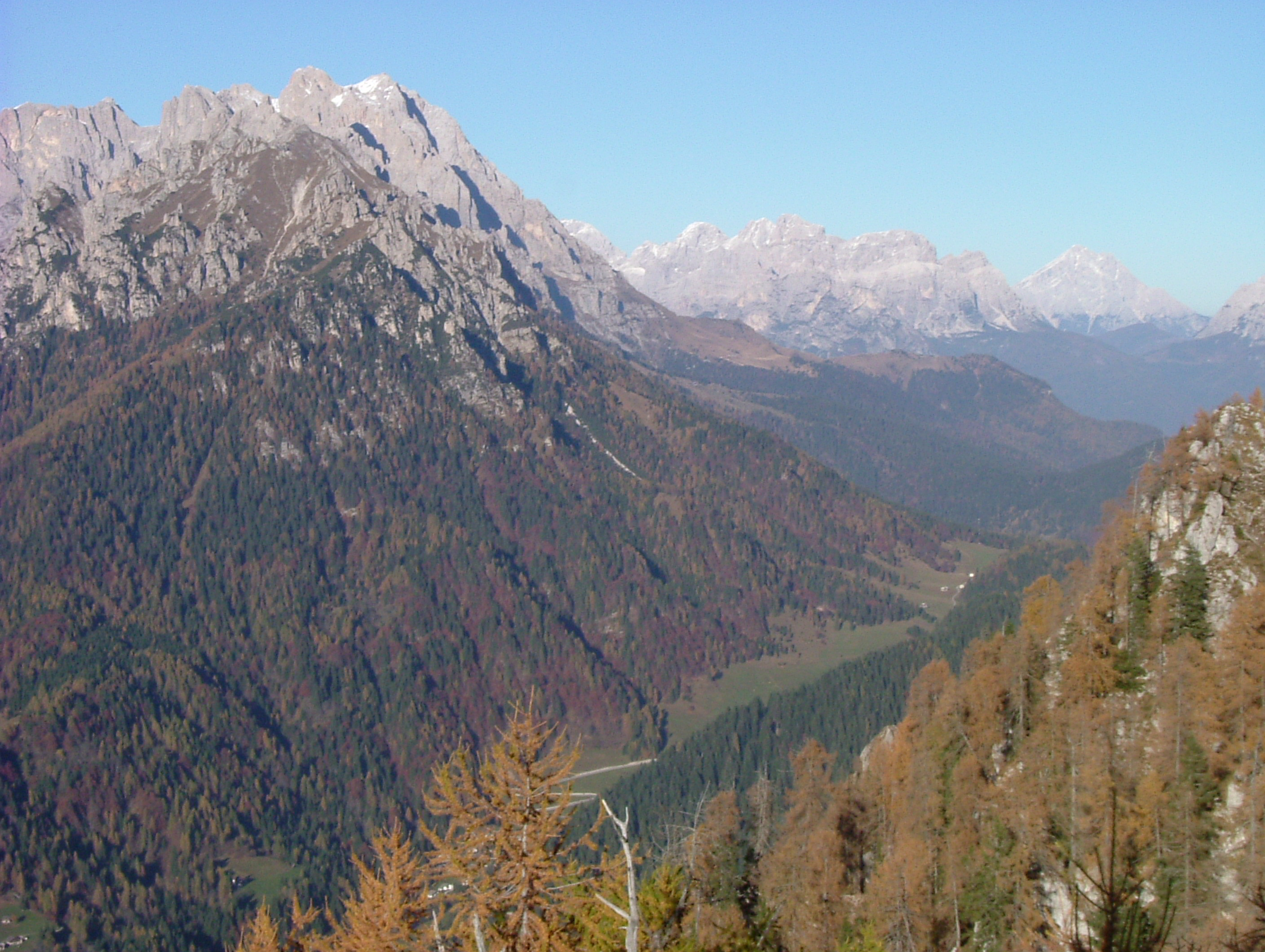

The Cereda Pass (Italian: Passo Cereda) (1361 m) is a high mountain pass in the southern Dolomites between the provinces of Trentino and Belluno in Italy.It connects Agordo in the Cordevole valley and Fiera di Primiero.

The Alta Via 2 traverses the pass, along with the state road, SS 347.

== See also ==
- List of highest paved roads in Europe
- List of mountain passes
