= 4th Bersaglieri Regiment =

Active Italian Army infantry unit

- 4° Reggimento bersaglieri
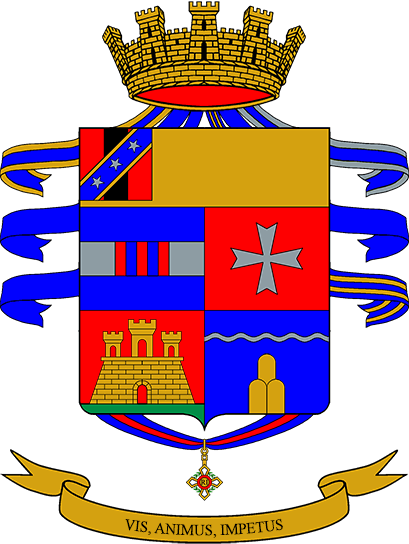
- Regimental coat of arms
- Active: 16 April 1861 — 18 Dec. 1864; 30 Dec. 1865 — 9 Dec. 1917; 11 Jan. 1919 — 9 Sep. 1943; 1 Feb. 1944 — 24 Sept. 1944; 1 Nov. 1975 — 31 Jan. 1991; 8 May 1993 — 29 May 1998; 1 Oct. 2022 — today
- Country: Italy
- Branch: Italian Army
- Part of: Bersaglieri Brigade "Garibaldi"
- Garrison/HQ: Maniago
- Mottos: "Vis, animus, impetus"
- Anniversaries: 18 June 1836
- Decorations: 1 × Military Order of Italy; 1 × Gold Medal of Military Valor; 1 × Silver Medal of Military Valor; 3 × Bronze Medals of Military Valor; 1 × Silver Medal of Army Valor

Insignia
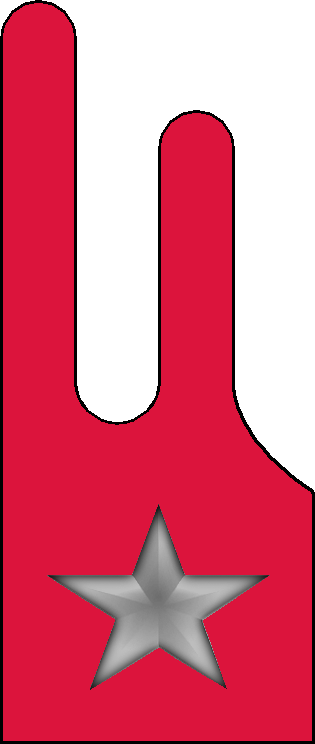
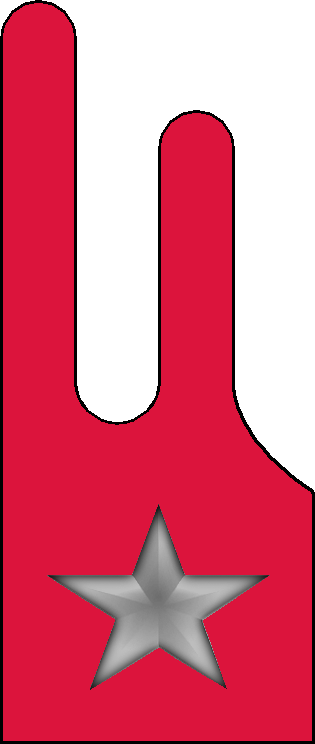
- Bersaglieri gorget patches

The 4th Bersaglieri Regiment (Italian: 4° Reggimento Bersaglieri) is an active unit of the Italian Army. The regiment is part of the army's infantry corps' Bersaglieri speciality. The regiment was formed in 1861 by the Royal Italian Army with preexisting battalions. During World War I the regiment served on the Italian front. During World War II the regiment fought in the Greco–Italian War and then served on occupation duty in Yugoslavia until it was disbanded by German forces after the announcement of the Armistice of Cassibile on 8 September 1943. The regiment was reformed by the Italian Co-belligerent Army on 1 February 1944 and fought on the allied side in the Italian Campaign until it was once more disbanded on 24 September 1944.

In 1976 the regiment's flag and traditions were assigned to the 26th Bersaglieri Battalion "Castelfidardo", which was assigned to the 8th Mechanized Brigade "Garibaldi". In 1989 the battalion was reduced to a reserve unit and in 1991 the battalion was disbanded. The battalion was reformed in 1993 as a training unit, which was once more disbanded in 1998. In October 2022 the unit's flag and traditions were assigned to the 4th Bersaglieri Command and Tactical Supports Unit of the Bersaglieri Brigade "Garibaldi". The regiment's anniversary falls, as for all Bersaglieri units, on 18 June 1836, the day the Bersaglieri speciality was founded.

== History ==
On 16 April 1861 the 4th Army Corps Bersaglieri Command was formed in Ravenna and assigned to the IV Army Corps. The command had purely administrative functions and consisted of the preexisting VI, VII, XI, XII, XXII, and XXVI battalions, and the IV Bersaglieri Depot Battalion. On 31 December 1861 the command was renamed 4th Bersaglieri Regiment, but continued to exert only administrative functions. On 18 December 1864 the Bersaglieri regiments were reduced from six to five and consequently the 4th Bersaglieri Regiment was disbanded. Its six battalions were transferred to the remaining regiments as follows:

- VI Battalion and VII Battalion to the 1st Bersaglieri Regiment
- XI Battalion to the 2nd Bersaglieri Regiment
- XII Battalion to the 3rd Bersaglieri Regiment
- XXII Battalion to the 5th Bersaglieri Regiment
- XXVI Battalion to the 6th Bersaglieri Regiment

On 30 December 1865 the 6th Bersaglieri Regiment in Capua was renamed 4th Bersaglieri Regiment. The reformed regiment retained the battalions of the 6th Bersaglieri Regiment and now consisted of the XXVI, XXVIII, XXIX, XXX, XXXI, XXXII, XXXIII, and XL battalions. On 1 January 1871 the 4th Bersaglieri Regiment was reorganized as an operational regiment with the XXVI Battalion, XXIX Battalion, XXXI Battalion, and XXXIII Battalion, while the XXVIII Battalion, XXX Battalion, XXXII Battalion, and XL Battalion were transferred to the newly formed 9th Bersaglieri Regiment. The four remaining battalions were renumbered as I, II, III, and IV battalion. On 16 September 1883 the IV Battalion was transferred to the newly formed 11th Bersaglieri Regiment. On 18 June 1886, all Bersaglieri battalions resumed their original numbering and afterwards the 4th Bersaglieri Regiment consisted of the XXVI Battalion, XXIX Battalion, and XXXI Battalion.

The XXVI Battalion had been formed by the Royal Sardinian Army in August 1859 as Bersaglieri Battalion of the Romagna, with volunteers from the recently conquered Romagna. The battalion participated in the Sardinian campaign in central and southern Italy, during which the battalion distinguished itself in the Battle of Castelfidardo, for which it was awarded a Bronze Medal of Military Valor, which was affixed to the flag of the 4th Bersaglieri Regiment and added to the regiment's coat of arms, when the battalion joined the regiment. The XXIX Battalion and XXXI Battalion were both formed by the Royal Italian Army in 1861. In 1866 the battalions participated in the Third Italian War of Independence. In September 1870 the XXVI and XXIX battalions participated in the capture of Rome.

In 1887-88 the regiment's 10th Company was deployed to Eritrea for the Italo-Ethiopian War of 1887–1889. In 1895-96 the regiment provided 13 officers and 509 troops to help form the I, II, IV, and V provisional battalions, which were deployed to Eritrea for the First Italo-Ethiopian War. In 1900-01 the regiment's 8th Company, along with companies of the 2nd Bersaglieri Regiment, 5th Bersaglieri Regiment, and 8th Bersaglieri Regiment, was assigned to a provisional Bersaglieri battalion, which served with the Eight-Nation Alliance in China during the Boxer Rebellion. On 1 October 1910 the regiment's depot in Turin formed the IV Cyclists Battalion.

=== Italo-Turkish War ===
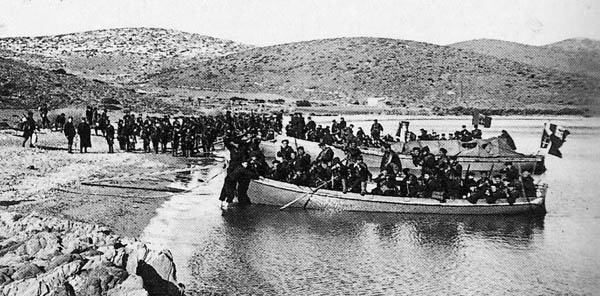
Italian troops landing on Rhodes in May 1912

On 29 September 1911 the Kingdom of Italy declared war against the Ottoman Empire. Initially the Italo-Turkish War was fought in Libya, but on 4 May 1912 Italian forces landed in Kalithea Bay on Rhodes in the Aegean Sea. Among the first troops ashore were two battalions of the 4th Bersaglieri Regiment. By 15 May the Italians attacked the remaining Turkish forces, which had retreated to Psithos. The next day, on 16 May, the attack was renewed and in the afternoon the remaining Turkish troops surrendered. For its conduct on 16 May the XXIX Battalion was awarded a Bronze Medal of Military Valor, which was affixed to the flag of the 4th Bersaglieri Regiment and added to the regiment's coat of arms. After the conclusion of the war the XXVI and XXXI battalions remained in Rhodes on occupation duty, while the rest of the regiment returned to Turin. As replacement for the two battalions in Rhodes the regiment's depot in Turin formed the XXXVII Battalion in June 1912.

=== World War I ===
On 7 January 1915 the regimental depot in Turin formed the XLI Battalion, and on 22 February 1915 the XLII Battalion. Both battalions operated as autonomous units until 15 February 1917, when they entered the newly formed 19th Bersaglieri Regiment, which too had been formed by the regimental depot of the 4th Bersaglieri Regiment. In May 1915, shortly before Italy's entry into World War I, the regiment received the XLIII Battalion from the 9th Bersaglieri Regiment to bring the 4th Bersaglieri Regiment back to full strength. Upon entering the regiment the XLIII Battalion was renumbered as XXVI bis Battalion. The regiment then consisted of the XXVI bis, XXIX, and XXXVII battalions, and the IV Cyclists Battalion, which operated as an autonomous unit throughout the war. On 24 May 1915, the day after Italy's entry into the war, the regiment operated on the Asiago plateau. In July the regiment was sent to the Isonzo front, where it fought in October 1915 at Ajba during the Third Battle of the Isonzo. In November the regiment was in the Tolmin sector during the Fourth Battle of the Isonzo, where it was tasked with taking the Austrian positions on the hills of Bučenica and Mengore on the right bank of the Isonzo river.

On 5 January 1916 the XXVI bis Battalion resumed to be numbered XLIII Battalion. In 1916 the regiment remained on the Isonzo front and fought in the Fifth, Sixth, Seventh, Eighth, and Ninth Battle of the Isonzo. During the Sixth Battle of the Isonzo the regiment's IV Cyclists Battalion distinguished itself on 6 August by capturing Hill 85 near on the Karst plateau near Monfalcone. For taking Hill 85 the battalion was awarded a Silver Medal of Military Valor, which was affixed to the flag of the 4th Bersaglieri Regiment and added to the regiment's coat of arms.

On 15 February 1917 the regiment's depot formed the command of the 19th Bersaglieri Regiment, and on 1 April 1917 the command of the 20th Bersaglieri Regiment. In May 1917 the 4th Bersaglieri Regiment fought in the Tenth Battle of the Isonzo at Bodrež, and on Monte Semmer and Monte Fratta. On 18 June 1917 the regiment formed, together with the 21st Bersaglieri Regiment, the V Bersaglieri Brigade. In August 1917 the brigade fought in the Eleventh Battle of the Isonzo on the Banjšice plateau. On 24 October 1917 the Austro-Hungarian Army and Imperial German Army commenced the Battle of Caporetto and for two days the brigade held the front against Austro-Hungarian attacks on Monte Globokak. Afterwards the brigade joined the Italian retreat to the Piave river. After escaping over the Piave river the 4th Bersaglieri Regiment counted 45 officers and 1,607 troops as lost, while the 21st Bersaglieri Regiment had lost 21 officers and 894 troops. On 7 November 1917 the V Bersaglieri Brigade and the 21st Bersaglieri Regiment were disbanded, with the remaining troops of the 21st Bersaglieri Regiment used to bring other Bersaglieri regiments back up to strength. The 4th Bersaglieri Regiment then returned to the Asiago plateau, where it fought between 19 November and 9 December 1917 on Monte Badenecche and Monte Tonderecar. In these battles the regiment lost another 67 officers and 2,043 troops. On 9 December 1917 the remnants of the shattered regiment were pulled out of the front and the regiment was disbanded.

For its conduct in August 1917 on the Banjšice plateau and for its sacrifice on 25 October 1917 on Monte Globokak the 4th Bersaglieri Regiment was awarded a Bronze Medal of Military Valor, which was affixed to the regiment's flag and added to the regiment's coat of arms.

=== Interwar years ===
On 11 January 1919 the 4th Bersaglieri Regiment was reformed by renaming the 19th Bersaglieri Regiment. The battalions of the 19th Bersaglieri Regiment were renumbered on the same date: the XLI Battalion was renumbered XXVI Battalion, the XLII Battalion was renumbered XXIX Battalion, while the XLV Battalion was renumbered XXXI Battalion. The regiment's XXVI Battalion and XXXI Battalion, which had spent the war on occupation duty in Rhodes were disbanded when they returned to Italy. The IV Cyclists Battalion was also disbanded in 1919. In 1921 the XXIX and XXXI battalions were reduced to reserve units. In January 1923 the regiment became a cyclists unit and in April of the same year the regiment reformed the XXIX Battalion. By 1926 the regiment consisted of the XXVI and XXIX battalions, and a depot. In 1935-36 the regiment formed a Motorcyclists Company, which was deployed to East Africa for the Second Italo-Ethiopian War. The regiment also provided 19 officers and 99 troops for other units deployed for the war. In 1936 the regiment lost its role as cyclists unit. On 29 March 1939 the regiment reformed the XXXI Battalion.

=== World War II ===
In June 1940 the regiment participated in the Invasion of France. At the time the regiment consisted of the following units:

- 4th Bersaglieri Regiment
  - Command Company
  - XXVI Battalion
  - XXIX Battalion
  - XXXI Battalion
  - 4th Motorcyclists Company
  - 4th Cannons Company, with 47/32 mod. 35 anti-tank guns

On 7 November 1940 the regiment was sent to Albania to fight in the Greco-Italian War. Initially the regiment was deployed in the area of Ersekë and Korçë. The regiment then held the front near Lake Ohrid. On 3 March 1941 the regiment received the LXXXIV Reinforcements Battalion. Nonetheless, by 1 April 1941 the regiment had suffered too many casualties and was pulled out of the front. The regiment then moved to Northern Albania, where it participated from 7 to 11 April 1941 in the Invasion of Yugoslavia and occupied Radolišta. On 12 April the regiment was once more sent South and clashed with Greek forces at Korçë and then advanced to Borovë, where on 19 April the regiment's commanding officer Colonel Guglielmo Scognamiglio was gravely injured. On 20 April the regiment reached Vllaho-Psillotarе on the Greek-Albanian border and crossed the bridge over the Sarantaporos into Greece. On 21 April Colonel Scognamiglio died of his wounds. For its conduct and valor in Albania the 4th Bersaglieri Regiment was awarded a Gold Medal of Military Valor, which was affixed to the regiment's flag and added to the regiment's coat of arms. To commemorate the death of the regiment's colonel an azure band with three stars was added to the canton of the regiment's coat of arms.

In May 1941 the regiment moved to Bosnia on occupation duty. For the next two year the regiment clashed with Yugoslav partisans in Bosnia and Croatia. On 8 September 1943, the day the Armistice of Cassibile was announced, the regimental command and the XXVI and XXIX battalions were in Split on the Dalmatian coast, while the XXXI Battalion was deployed in Bosnia. Immediately after the announcement of the armistice invading German forces began to disarm and disband the regiment and its units, but the troops of the XXIX Battalion commandeered every vessel in the Split's harbour and sailed for Apulia in Southern Italy, which had already been liberated by the British 1st Airborne Division.

On 1 February 1944, the Italian Co-belligerent Army reformed the 4th Bersaglieri Regiment with the XXIX Battalion and the XXXIII Battalion of the 11th Bersaglieri Regiment. The XXXIII Battalion, which had been based on Corsica, had fought against retreating German forces after the announcement of the Armistice of Cassibile. The battalion was then moved to Sardinia, before being transferred to mainland Italy, where it joined the 4th Bersaglieri Regiment. The reformed regiment was assigned to the I Motorized Grouping, which fought on the allied side in the Italian Campaign. On 18 April 1944 the I Motorized Grouping was expanded and renamed Italian Liberation Corps. On 27 May 1944 the corps was assigned to the Polish II Corps and in July 1944 it participated in the Battle of Ancona.

On 24 September 1944 the Italian Liberation Corps was disbanded its units and personnel used to form the combat groups "Folgore" and "Legnano". On the same date the remaining troops of the 4th Bersaglieri Regiment, which had suffered heavy losses fighting on the Winter Line and in the Battle of Ancona, were grouped, together with the survivors of the LI Bersaglieri Officer Cadets Training Battalion, into the Bersaglieri Battalion "Goito", which was assigned to the Special Infantry Regiment "Legnano". The regiment then joined the Combat Group "Legnano", which was equipped with British materiel and assigned to the Polish II Corps. After the war the Special Infantry Regiment "Legnano" was used to reform the 67th Infantry Regiment "Legnano", while the Bersaglieri Battalion "Goito" was transferred to the 3rd Bersaglieri Regiment.

=== Cold War ===
During the 1975 army reform the army disbanded the regimental level and newly independent battalions were granted for the first time their own flags. On 31 October 1975 the 8th Bersaglieri Regiment was disbanded and the next day the regiment's XII Battalion in Pordenone became an autonomous unit and was renamed 26th Bersaglieri Battalion "Castelfidardo". The battalion was named for the Battle of Castelfidardo, where the XXVI Battalion had distinguished itself in 1860 and been awarded a Bronze Medal of Military Valor. The battalion was assigned to the 8th Mechanized Brigade "Garibaldi" and consisted of a command, a command and services company, three mechanized companies with M113 armored personnel carriers, and a heavy mortar company with M106 mortar carriers with 120mm Mod. 63 mortars. The battalion fielded now 896 men (45 officers, 100 non-commissioned officers, and 751 soldiers).

On 12 November 1976 the President of the Italian Republic Giovanni Leone assigned with decree 846 the flag and traditions of the 4th Bersaglieri Regiment to the 26th Bersaglieri Battalion "Castelfidardo". For its conduct and work after the 1976 Friuli earthquake the battalion was awarded a Silver Medal of Army Valor, which was affixed to the battalion's war flag and added to the battalion's coat of arms. Between 23 October 1983 and 24 January 1984 the battalion transferred a company with 6 officers, 12 non-commissioned officers, and 109 soldiers to the 3rd Bersaglieri Battalion "Cernaia", which was deployed to Lebanon as part of the Multinational Force in Lebanon.

=== Recent times ===
After the end of the Cold War Italian Army began to reorganize and draw down its forces and on 10 December 1989 the 26th Bersaglieri Battalion "Castelfidardo" was reduced to a reserve unit and the flag of the 4th Bersaglieri Regiment was transferred to the Shrine of the Flags in the Vittoriano in Rome. On 31 January 1991 the 26th Bersaglieri Battalion "Castelfidardo" was officially disbanded. On 8 May 1993 the unit was reformed as 26th Battalion "Castelfidardo" by renaming the 2nd Battalion "Pordenone" in Pordenone. The battalion trained the recruits destined for the 132nd Armored Brigade "Ariete". On 29 May 1998 the battalion was once more disbanded and the flag of the 4th Bersaglieri Regiment was returned to the Shrine of the Flags in the Vittoriano in Rome.

=== Reactivation ===
On 1 October 2022, the flag and traditions of the 4th Bersaglieri Regiment were assigned to the Command and Tactical Supports Unit "Garibaldi" of the Bersaglieri Brigade "Garibaldi". On the same day the unit was renamed 4th Bersaglieri Command and Tactical Supports Unit.

== Organization ==
As of 2024, the 4th Bersaglieri Command and Tactical Supports Unit is organized as follows:

- 4th Bersaglieri Command and Tactical Supports Unit, in Caserta
  - Command and Logistic Support Company
  - Signal Company

== See also ==
- Bersaglieri
