= 67th Infantry Regiment "Legnano" =

Inactive Italian Army infantry unit

- 67° Reggimento Fanteria "Legnano"
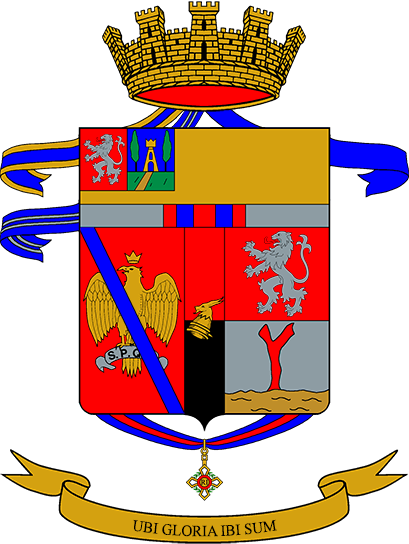
- Regimental coat of arms
- Active: 1 Aug. 1862 – 30 Sept. 1975; 29 Oct 1975 – 5 Oct. 1995
- Country: Italy
- Branch: Italian Army
- Part of: Mechanized Brigade "Legnano"
- Garrison/HQ: Solbiate Olona
- Mottos: "Ubi gloria, ibi sum"
- Anniversaries: 8 December 1943 – Battle of Monte Lungo
- Decorations: 1× Military Order of Italy; 1× Gold Medal of Military Valor; 1× Bronze Medal of Military Valor; 1× War Cross of Military Valor

Insignia
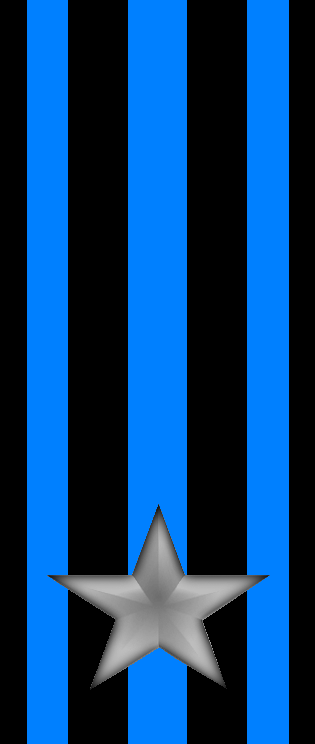
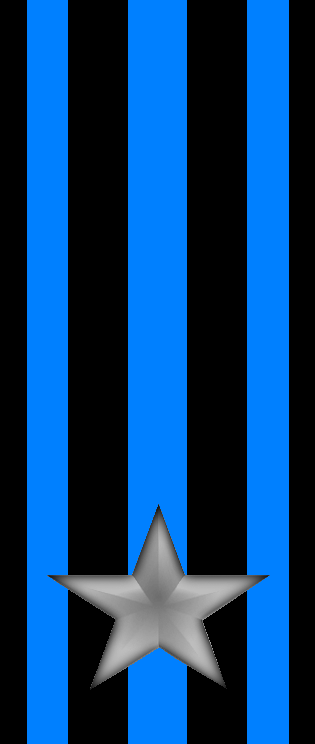
- Regimental gorget patches

The 67th Infantry Regiment "Legnano" (Italian: 67° Reggimento Fanteria "Legnano") is an inactive unit of the Italian Army last based in Solbiate Olona. Formed in 1862 and originally named for the city of Palermo the regiment is part of the Italian Army's infantry arm. Since 1939 the regiment is named for the medieval Battle of Legnano.

The regiment was one of ten infantry regiments formed on 1 August 1862. In 1866 the regiment participated in the Third Italian War of Independence. During World War I the regiment fought on the Italian front and the Macedonian front. During World War II the regiment was assigned to the 58th Infantry Division "Legnano", with which it fought in the Greco-Italian War. The command of the regiment and the II Battalion had just arrived Apulia in southern Italy, when the Armistice of Cassibile was announced on 8 September 1943. The regiment immediately clashed with invading German forces. The regiment joined the Italian Co-belligerent Army and fought on the allied side in the Italian campaign. From 28 September 1943 to 27 January 1944 the regiment was assigned to the I Motorized Grouping, which was attached to the American 36th Infantry Division. In December 1943 the regiment distinguished itself in the Battle of Monte Lungo, for which it was awarded Italy's highest military honor the Gold Medal of Military Valor. After the war the regiment was assigned to the Infantry Division "Legnano" until it was disbanded in 1975 and its flag and traditions assigned to a battalion sized unit. Reformed as an armored regiment in 1992 the regiment was disbanded in 1995.

== History ==
=== Formation ===
On 1 August 1862 the 31st Infantry Regiment (Brigade "Siena"), 32nd Infantry Regiment (Brigade "Siena"), 39th Infantry Regiment (Brigade "Bologna"), 40th Infantry Regiment (Brigade "Bologna"), 43rd Infantry Regiment (Brigade "Forlì"), and 44th Infantry Regiment (Brigade "Forlì") ceded their 17th Company and 18th Company to help form the 67th Infantry Regiment (Brigade "Palermo") in Turin. The twelve companies were grouped into three battalions. On the same date the 59th Infantry Regiment (Brigade "Calabria") and the 60th Infantry Regiment (Brigade "Calabria") ceded both a depot company to help form the new regiment's depot in Turin, while the 5th Provisional Depot in Messina in Sicily provided four companies to form the regiment's IV Battalion, which initially remained based in Messina.

The regiment was assigned, together with the 68th Infantry Regiment, to the Brigade "Palermo" in Turin. The brigade's command and the 68th Infantry Regiment had also been formed on 1 August 1962.

In 1867–69 the regiment operated in Calabria in southern Italy to suppress the anti-Sardinian revolt, which had erupted after the Kingdom of Sardinia had annexed the Kingdom of Two Sicilies in 1862. In 1866 the regiment participated in the Third Italian War of Independence. On 25 October 1871 the brigade level was abolished and the two regiments of the Brigade "Palermo" were renamed 67th Infantry Regiment "Palermo", respectively 68th Infantry Regiment "Palermo". On 2 January 1881 the brigade level was reintroduced and the two regiments were renamed again as 67th Infantry Regiment (Brigade "Palermo") and 68th Infantry Regiment (Brigade "Palermo").

On 1 November 1884 the regiment ceded some of its companies to help form the 87th Infantry Regiment (Brigade "Friuli") in Milan. In 1887 the regiment's 3rd Company participated in the Italo-Ethiopian War of 1887–1889. In 1895–96 the regiment provided eight officers and 245 enlisted for units deployed to Italian Eritrea for the First Italo-Ethiopian War. In 1911–12 the regiment provided 32 officers and 1,088 enlisted to augment units fighting in the Italo-Turkish War.

=== World War I ===
At the outbreak of World War I, the Brigade "Palermo" formed, together with the Brigade "Cuneo" and the 27th Field Artillery Regiment, the 5th Division. At the time the 67th Infantry Regiment consisted of three battalions, each of which fielded four fusilier companies and one machine gun section. In March 1915, the depot of the 67th Infantry Regiment in Como formed the 154th Infantry Regiment (Brigade "Novara"). After Italy's entry into the war on 23 May 1915 the Brigade "Palermo" was deployed to the Italian front: until October 1915 the brigade fought against Austro-Hungarian forces in the Val Camonica valley in the Tonale Pass area. In November of the same year the brigade was on the Karst plateau, where it fought in the Fourth Battle of the Isonzo, with the 67th Infantry Regiment deployed on Monte San Michele.

On 1 January 1916 the 67th Infantry Regiment's depot in Como formed the 206th Infantry Regiment (Brigade "Lambro"). In March 1916 the brigade fought in the Fifth Battle of the Isonzo in the Tolmin sector, where it tried to take the hills of Bučenica and Mengore. In May 1917 the brigade fought in the Tenth Battle of the Isonzo for the summit of Sveta Gora near Gorizia. In August 1917 the brigade fought in the Eleventh Battle of the Isonzo on Mount Škabrijel. In October and November 1917 the brigade fought rearguard actions during the Italian retreat after the Battle of Caporetto.

In June 1918 the brigade fought in the Second Battle of the Piave River in the area of Nervesa. On 13 September 1918 the brigade was shipped from Taranto to Vlorë in Albania to participate in the last offensive on the Macedonian front. On 18 September the brigade assembled at Vlorë and then entered the front. In October 1918 the brigade pursued the retreating Austro-Hungarians, liberating Durrës on 15 October and Shkodër on 1 November.

After the war the brigade remained in Albania until the Italian Protectorate of Albania ended in 1920. For its conduct during the war the two regiments of the Brigade "Palermo" were both awarded a Bronze Medal of Military Valor.

=== Interwar years ===
On 27 October 1926 the 67th Infantry Regiment, now renamed 67th Infantry Regiment "Palermo", was assigned to the II Infantry Brigade, which was the infantry component of the 2nd Territorial Division of Novara. On 1 November 1926 the command of the Brigade "Palermo" was disbanded and the 68th Infantry Regiment, now renamed 68th Infantry Regiment "Palermo", was assigned to the VI Infantry Brigade, which was the infantry component of the 6th Territorial Division of Milan.

In 1934 the 2nd Territorial Division of Novara changed its name to 2nd Infantry Division "Sforzesca" to commemorate the Battle of Sforzesca in 1849, while the 6th Territorial Division of Milan changed its name to 6th Infantry Division "Legnano" to commemorate the Battle of Legnano in 1176. The name changes also extended to the two divisions' infantry brigades. In 1935–36 the regiment provided 16 officers and 1,478 enlisted for units deployed for the Second Italo-Ethiopian War.

On 24 May 1939 the 6th Infantry Division "Legnano" was renamed 6th Infantry Division "Cuneo" and transferred the "Legnano" name, together with the 67th Infantry Regiment "Palermo", to the newly formed 58th Infantry Division "Legnano", which was based in the city of Legnano. On the same date the Legnano division received the 68th Infantry Regiment "Palermo" from the 2nd Infantry Division "Sforzesca", and formed the 58th Artillery Regiment "Legano". On the same date all two infantry regiments changed their names from "Palermo" to "Legano".

=== World War II ===
==== Greco-Italian War ====
At the outbreak of World War II the regiment consisted of a command, a command company, three fusilier battalions, a support weapons battery equipped with 65/17 infantry support guns, and a mortar company equipped with 81mm Mod. 35 mortars. In June 1940 the Legnano division was in the army reserve during the Italian invasion of France. In early January 1941 the division was transferred to Albania to reinforce the Italian front in the Greco-Italian War. On 7 January 1941 the Legnano entered the front in the sector along the coast. On 26 January the division fought in the Battle of Trebeshina. After Greek units withdrew from the Albanian front during the Battle of Greece, the Legnano advanced and reached Këlcyrë on 16 April 1941 from where it advanced to Kuman. On 21 June the division began boarding ships in Vlorë for the return to Lombardy. For their conduct during the Greco-Italian War the two infantry regiments of the Legnano division were each awarded a War Cross of Military Valor, which were affixed to the regiments' flags and are depicted on the regiments' coats of arms.

In November 1942 the division participated in the occupation of Vichy France and was then deployed for coastal defence duty in the Cannes-Saint-Tropez sector of the Italian occupation zone.

==== Italian campaign ====
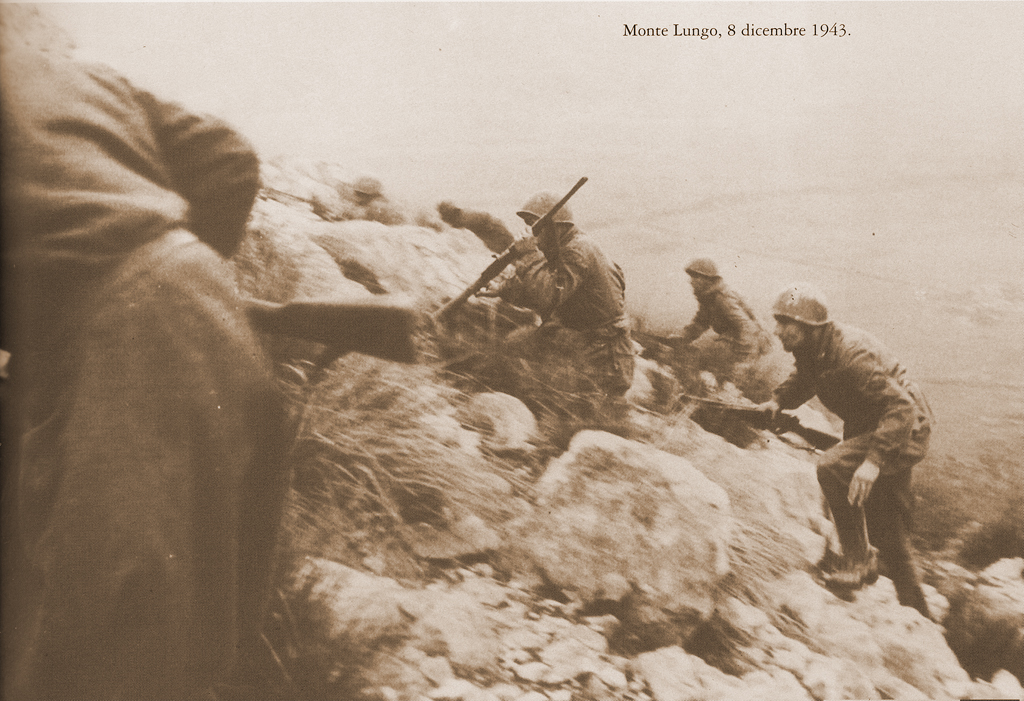
Troops of the 67th Infantry Regiment "Legnano" during the Battle of Montelungo in December 1943

In August 1943 the Legnano division was ordered to move to Apulia in the South of Italy. The division's units were moved by rail through Bologna and then to Brindisi. After the Armistice of Cassibile was announced on 8 September 1943, some units were already at Brindisi and Francavilla Fontana, while others were stranded in Bologna or in locations on the way to their destination. Only the command of the 67th Infantry Regiment "Legnano" and the II Battalion had reached Apulia in time, while the regiment's remaining units were disbanded by invading German forces. Together with the 152nd Infantry Division "Piceno", the 210th Coastal Division, and the XXXI Coastal Brigade the units of the Legnano in Apulia deployed to form a defensive line from Taranto through Grottaglie, Francavilla Fontana, and Latiano to Brindisi, to screen the landing of the British 1st Airborne Division at Taranto on 9 September from attacks of the German 1st Fallschirmjäger Division.

On 28 September 1943 the Legnano division's command was used to form the I Motorized Grouping, which was intended to fight on the Allied side in the Italian campaign. The 67th Infantry Regiment "Legnano", now renamed 67th Motorized Infantry Regiment "Legnano", became the grouping's infantry component and was reinforced with the Motorized Bersaglieri Battalion, which had been formed with the recruits and instructors of the LI Bersaglieri Complementary Officer Cadets Training Battalion in Bari. On 9 September the Bersaglieri of the LI Battalion had defeated two German Fallschirmjäger companies, which had tried to occupy and destroy the harbour of Bari. In the following days the battalion fought, together with British paratroopers, against German units in Trani and Barletta. The grouping also included the 11th Motorized Artillery Regiment.

The I Motorized Grouping was attached to the American 36th Infantry Division for the Battle of San Pietro Infine, which aimed at breaking through the German Bernhardt Line. From 7 to 16 December 1943 the 67th Infantry Regiment "Legnano" assaulted the key German position on Monte Lungo, which was finally taken on 16 December. The operation had cost the regiment 79 killed in action and 89 wounded.

On 27 January 1944 the regiment was replaced in the I Motorized Grouping by the 68th Infantry Regiment "Legnano". The next day the 67th Motorized Infantry Regiment "Legnano" was reorganized: the Motorized Bersaglieri Battalion left the regiment and was replaced by the I Battalion of the 93rd Infantry Regiment "Messina". The regiment now consisted of a command, a command company, and two battalions. The regiment was assigned to the Italian Co-belligerent Army's 210th Division, which performed rear area security and labour duties for the American Fifth Army.

On 22 March 1944 the I Motorized Grouping was reorganized as Italian Liberation Corps and the 68th Infantry Regiment "Legnano" joined the corps' II Brigade. On 24 September 1944 the II Brigade of the Italian Liberation Corps was reorganized and renamed Combat Group "Legnano". The combat group consisted of the 68th Infantry Regiment "Legnano" and the Special Infantry Regiment "Legnano", which was formed on 1 October 1944 with the remnants of the 3rd Alpini Regiment and 4th Bersaglieri Regiment.

For the conquest of Monte Lungo the regiment was awarded Italy's highest military honor the Gold Medal of Military Valor.

=== Cold War ===
After the war the combat group and the 68th Infantry Regiment "Legnano" were based in Bergamo, while the Special Infantry Regiment "Legnano" was based in Legnano. Meanwhile, the 67th Infantry Regiment "Legnano" was still in the South of Italy, where the regiment either disbanded its units or transferred them to other commands. By August 1945 only the regimental command of the 67th Infantry Regiment "Legnano" remained active. On 15 October 1945 the Combat Group "Legnano" was renamed Infantry Division "Legnano".

In early 1946 the regimental command of the 67th Infantry Regiment "Legnano" moved to Legnano, where on 30 June 1946 the Special Infantry Regiment "Legnano" was disbanded. The next day the regimental command of the 67th Infantry Regiment "Legnano" took command of the units of the disbanded Special Infantry Regiment "Legnano" and took the regiment's place in the Infantry Division "Legnano". At the time the 67th Infantry Regiment "Legnano" consisted of a command, a command company, three fusilier battalions, a mortar company equipped with 81mm Mod. 35 mortars, and an anti-tank cannons company equipped with QF 6-pounder anti-tank guns. In fall 1946 the cannons company was disbanded. In 1958 the regiment moved from Legnano to Milan and four year later to Montorio Veronese. By the 1960s the 67th Infantry Regiment "Legnano" had formed the IV Mechanized Battalion and an anti-tank company. At the time the regiment consisted of the following units:

- 67th Infantry Regiment "Legnano", in Montorio Veronese
  - Command and Services Company, in Montorio Veronese
  - I Battalion, in Montorio Veronese
  - II Battalion, in Montorio Veronese
  - III Battalion, in Montorio Veronese
  - IV Mechanized Battalion, in Montorio Veronese
  - Anti-tank Company, in Montorio Veronese

During the 1975 army reform the army disbanded the regimental level and newly independent battalions were granted for the first time their own flags. On 30 September 1975, the 67th Infantry Regiment "Legnano" and the regiment's II Battalion and IV Mechanized Battalion were disbanded. The next day the regiment's I Battalion became an autonomous unit and was renamed 85th Mechanized Infantry Battalion "Verona", while the regiment's III Battalion became an autonomous unit and was renamed 30th Mechanized Infantry Battalion "Pisa". On 29 October 1975, the 68th Infantry Regiment "Legnano" was disbanded. The next day the regiment's I Battalion in Bergamo became an autonomous unit and was renamed 68th Mechanized Infantry Battalion "Palermo", which was assigned the flag and traditions of the 68th Infantry Regiment "Legnano". On the same date, the regiment's IV Mechanized Battalion in Monza became an autonomous unit and was renamed 67th Mechanized Infantry Battalion "Montelungo", which was assigned the flag and traditions of the 67th Infantry Regiment "Legnano". On 29 October 1975 the 68th Infantry Regiment "Legnano" was disbanded and the regiment's IV Mechanized Battalion in Monza was renamed 67th Mechanized Infantry Battalion "Montelungo" and assigned the flag and traditions of the 67th Infantry Regiment "Legnano". To avoid confusion with the Mechanized Brigade "Legnano" the battalion's name was changed from "Legnano" to "Montelungo" to commemorate the battle the regiment had fought there on 8 December 1943.

The battalion was assigned to the Mechanized Brigade "Legnano" and consisted of a command, a command and services company, three mechanized companies with M113 armored personnel carriers, and a heavy mortar company with M106 mortar carriers with 120mm Mod. 63 mortars. At the time the battalion fielded 896 men (45 officers, 100 non-commissioned officers, and 751 soldiers). From 7 June to 10 November 1983 the battalion was assigned to the Multinational Force in Lebanon.

=== Recent times ===
In 1991 the battalion moved from Monza to Solbiate Olona. On 27 August 1992 the 67th Mechanized Infantry Battalion "Montelungo" was disbanded and the next day the personnel of the battalion formed, together with the personnel of the disbanded 4th Tank Battalion "M.O. Passalacqua", the 67th Armored Infantry Regiment "Legnano" in Solbiate Olona.

On 5 October 1995 the 67th Armored Infantry Regiment "Legnano" was disbanded and on 16 November the flag of the 67th Infantry Regiment "Legnano" was transferred to the Shrine of the Flags in the Vittoriano in Rome.

== See also ==
- Mechanized Brigade "Legnano"
