= Legnano (disambiguation) =

Leganano usually refers to the Italian town and commune in north-western Milan

It may also refer to:

- A.C. Legnano, an Italian association football club based in Legnano
- Battle of Legnano, fought on 29 May 1176 between the forces of the Holy Roman Empire and the Lombard League.
- Legnano (cycling team), an Italian professional cycling team active from 1906 to 1966
- 58th Infantry Division Legnano, an Infantry Division of the Royal Italian Army during the Second World War
- Legnano Mechanized Brigade, a mechanized brigade of the Italian Army, 1975 - 1997
- Legnano Basket Knights, an Italian professional basketball club based in Legnano
