= 11th Field Artillery Regiment (Italy) =

Inactive Italian Army artillery unit

- 11° Reggimento Artiglieria da Campagna
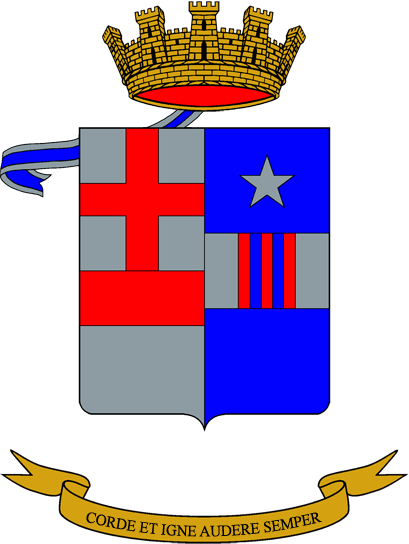
- Regimental coat of arms
- Active: 1 Nov. 1884 — 27 Aug. 1991
- Country: Italy
- Branch: Italian Army
- Part of: Mechanized Brigade "Legnano"
- Garrison/HQ: Cremona
- Motto: "Corde et igne audere semper"
- Anniversaries: 15 June 1913 - Second Battle of the Piave River
- Decorations: 1x Silver Medal of Military Valor

Insignia
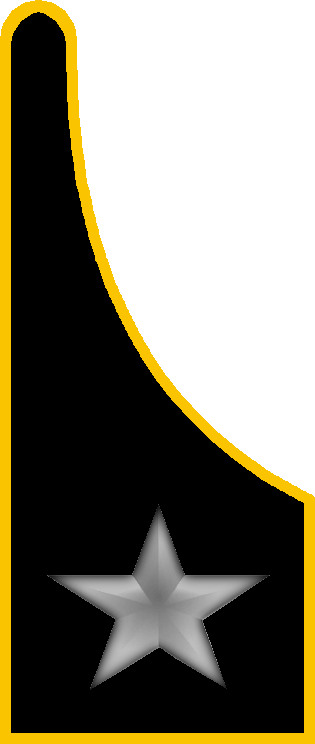
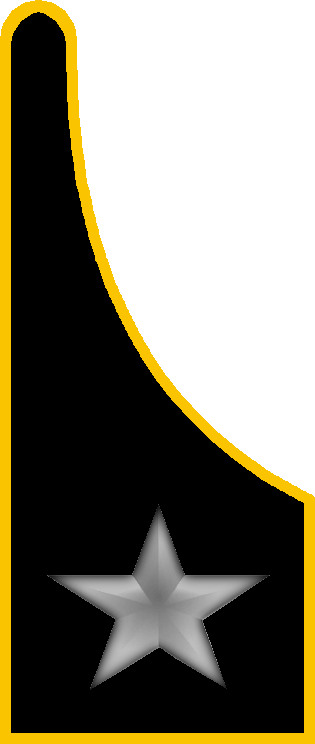
- Regimental gorget patches

The 11th Field Artillery Regiment (Italian: 11° Reggimento Artiglieria da Campagna) is an inactive field artillery regiment of the Italian Army, which was based in Cremona in Lombardy. The regiment was formed in 1884 by the Royal Italian Army and served during World War I on the Italian front. In 1935 the regiment was assigned to the 3rd Infantry Division "Monferrato" and designated as 11th Artillery Regiment "Monferrato". In 1939 the division became the 3rd Infantry Division "Ravenna" and consequently the regiment was renamed 11th Artillery Regiment "Ravenna". In June 1942 the Ravenna division was ordered to deploy to the Eastern Front of World War II and before departing Italy the division exchanged artillery regiments with the 104th Infantry Division "Mantova".

Consequently, the regiment was renamed 11th Artillery Regiment "Mantova". After allied forces landed on the Italian peninsula and the Armistice of Cassibile was announced on 8 September 1943 the Mantova division joined the Italian Co-belligerent Army. On 26 September 1943 the regiment was transferred to the I Motorized Grouping, which had been formed with units of the 58th Infantry Division "Legnano". The regiment was once more renamed and now designated 11th Motorized Artillery Regiment. In April 1944 the I Motorized Grouping joined the Italian Liberation Corps, whose II Brigade became the Combat Group "Legnano" in September 1944. The regiment joined the combat group, which was assigned to the II Polish Corps for the Italian campaign.

In 1945 the Combat Group "Legnano" was reorganized as Infantry Division "Legnano" and the regiment, now designated 11th Field Artillery Regiment, remained with the division until 1975, when it was reduced to 11th Field Artillery Group "Monferrato". The group was assigned to Mechanized Brigade "Legnano" and disbanded at the end of the Cold War in 1991. The regimental anniversary falls, as for all Italian Army artillery regiments, on June 15, the beginning of the Second Battle of the Piave River in 1918.

This article is about the Royal Italian Army's 11th Field Artillery Regiment, which was a support unit assigned to a division-level command. This regiment is unrelated to the 11th Heavy Field Artillery Regiment, which was a support unit assigned to a corps-level command.

== History ==
On 1 November 1884 the 11th Field Artillery Regiment was formed in Alessandria with ten batteries, that had been ceded by the 4th Field Artillery Regiment, 5th Field Artillery Regiment, 6th Field Artillery Regiment, 8th Field Artillery Regiment and 9th Field Artillery Regiment. On 1 November 1888 the regiment ceded eight batteries and one train company to help form the 23rd Field Artillery Regiment. On 1 October 1891 the regiment reorganized two of its batteries as mountain batteries, which the regiment transferred on 31 December 1893 to the 5th Field Artillery Regiment and received two field batteries in return.

On 1 March 1895 the regiment ceded one field battery to the 5th Field Artillery Regiment, which on the same date ceded its six mountain batteries to the Mountain Artillery Regiment. In 1895-96 the regiment provided two officers and 182 troops to help form units for the First Italo-Ethiopian War. During the Italo-Turkish War in 1911-12 the regiment mobilized one of its group commands and three batteries, which were deployed to Libya. The regiment also provided one officer and 79 troops for other deployed units. On 1 March 1915 the regiment ceded its II Group to help form the 26th Field Artillery Regiment.

=== World War I ===
At the outbreak of World War I the regiment was assigned to the II Army Corps as the corps' artillery regiment. At the time the regiment consisted of a command, three groups with a combined eight batteries equipped with 75/27 mod. 11 field guns, and a depot. During the war the regiment's depot in Alessandria formed the command of the 48th Field Artillery Regiment, as well as the 1st, 7th, 15th, and 19th heavy field artillery groupings, six heavy field howitzer groups, and one heavy field cannons group.

During the war the regiment was initially deployed on Podgora, where it also fought in July and August 1915 in the Second Battle of the Isonzo. Afterwards the regiments was sent to Plave, where it fought in the Third Battle of the Isonzo and Fourth Battle of the Isonzo. In 1916 the regiment participated in the Battle of Gorizia. In June 1917 the regiment was transferred to Monte Ortigara for the Battle of Mount Ortigara. The rest of the year the regiment was deployed in the Val Brenta and the upper Val Maron. At the outbreak of the Battle of Caporetto the regiment was at San Martino di Castrozza, from where it retreated with the rest of the army to the Monte Grappa massiv, where it fought on Col Moschin. In June 1918 the regiment was at Meolo and Vallio during the Second Battle of the Piave River and in July moved to San Donà di Piave. During the decisive Battle of Vittorio Veneto the regiment crossed the Piave river at Salettuol and then advanced to Conegliano and Arba.

In 1926 the regiment was assigned to the 3rd Territorial Division of Alessandria and consisted of a command, one group with 100/17 mod. 14 howitzers, two groups with 75/27 mod. 06 field guns, one group with mule-carried 75/13 mod. 15 mountain guns, and a depot. In January 1935 the 3rd Territorial Division of Alessandria was renamed 3rd Infantry Division "Monferrato" and consequently the regiment was renamed 11th Artillery Regiment "Monferrato". In 1935 the 25th Artillery Regiment "Assietta" and 29th Artillery Regiment "Cosseria" were mobilized for the Second Italo-Ethiopian War. The 11th Artillery Regiment "Monferrato" ceded its 4th Battery with 75/27 mod. 06 field guns to the 29th Artillery Regiment "Cosseria" for the duration of the war and on 1 October 1935 the regiment ceded its III Group with 75/27 mod. 06 field guns to help reform the 48th Artillery Regiment "Cosseria II", which served as replacement for the 29th Artillery Regiment "Cosseria" during the war. On the same date the regiment received a group with 100/17 mod. 14 howitzers from the 25th Artillery Regiment "Assietta" as replacement. The regiment also provided 14 officers and 294 troops to augment other deployed units.

On 1 October 1936 the 25th Artillery Regiment "Assietta" and 29th Artillery Regiment "Cosseria" returned from the war and the 48th Artillery Regiment "Cosseria II" was disbanded, with all the groups returning to their respective regiments. On the same date the regiment received a group with 75/13 mod. 15 mountain guns, which had been formed by the Complement Officer Cadets School in Bra. On 31 March 1939 the division was renamed 3rd Infantry Division "Ravenna" and consequently the regiment was renamed 11th Artillery Regiment "Ravenna". On 1 September 1939 the regiment ceded its II Group with 75/27 mod. 06 field guns to help reform the 56th Artillery Regiment "Casale" of the 56th Infantry Division "Casale", while on 3 September the regiment's depot formed the command and the command unit for the reformed 36th Artillery Regiment "Forlì" of the 36th Infantry Division "Forlì".

=== World War II ===
On 10 June 1940, the day Italy entered World War II, the regiment consisted of a command, command unit, one group with 100/17 mod. 14 howitzers, two groups with 75/13 mod. 15 mountain guns, and an anti-aircraft battery with 20/65 mod. 35 anti-aircraft guns. The regiment was assigned to the 3rd Infantry Division "Ravenna", which also included the 37th Infantry Regiment "Ravenna" and 38th Infantry Regiment "Ravenna". From 10 June 1940 division participated in the Italian invasion of France and advanced to the village of Fontan. On 7 September 1940 the regiment transferred one of its groups with 75/13 mod. 15 mountain guns to the 49th Field Artillery Regiment "Parma" of the 49th Infantry Division "Parma" and received a group with 75/27 mod. 11 field guns in return. In April 1941 the division participated in the Invasion of Yugoslavia.

In March 1942 the army decided to assign the 3rd Infantry Division "Ravenna" to the Italian Army in Russia, which was to deploy to the Eastern Front. In preparation the Ravenna division transferred the 11th Field Artillery Regiment "Ravenna" in March 1942 to the 104th Infantry Division "Mantova", which in turn ceded its 121st Motorized Artillery Regiment to the Ravenna division. Consequently the regiment was renamed 11th Artillery Regiment "Mantova". On 7 April 1943 the regiment received a group with 100/22 mod. 14/19 howitzers from the 37th Artillery Regiment "Piacenza" of the 103rd Infantry Division "Piacenza".

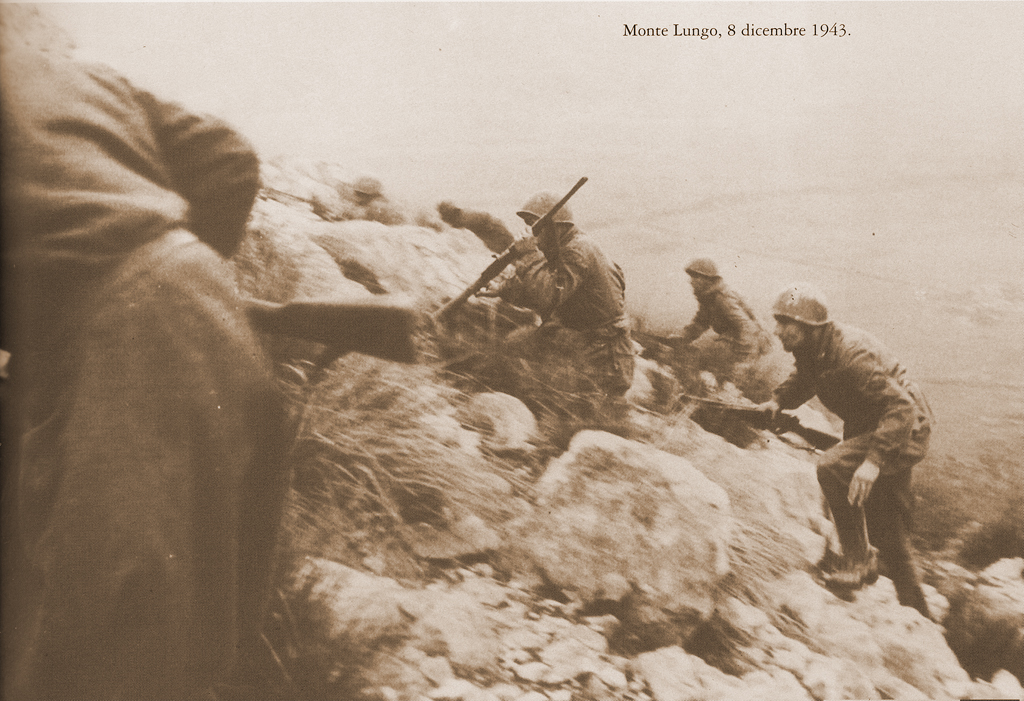
Troops of the 67th Infantry Regiment "Legnano" during the Battle of Montelungo in December 1943

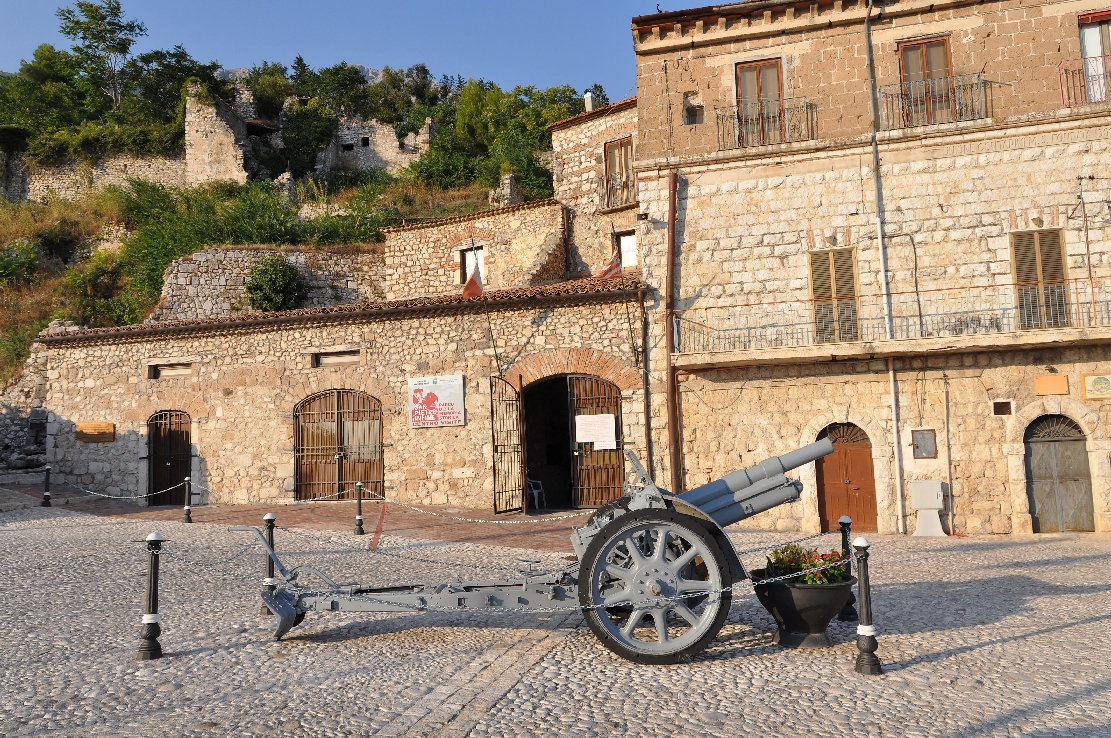
100/22 mod. 14/19 howitzer of the 11th Motorized Artillery Regiment in San Pietro Infine

By September 1943 the regiment consisted of a command, command unit, the I and II groups with 100/22 mod. 14/19 howitzers, the III and IV groups with 75/18 mod. 35 howitzers, a battery with 75/13 mod. 15 mountain guns, and the 363rd Anti-aircraft Battery with 20/65 mod. 35 anti-aircraft guns. The division was Calabria when the Armistice of Cassibile was announced on 8 September 1943 and remained loyal to King Victor Emmanuel III. The division joined the Italian Co-belligerent Army and on 26 September 1943 the 11th Artillery Regiment "Mantova" was assigned to the I Motorized Grouping, which had been formed with the 67th Infantry Regiment "Legnano" and other units detached from the 58th Infantry Division "Legnano". The regiment was once more renamed and now designated 11th Motorized Artillery Regiment. By the middle of October 1943 the regiment consisted of the following units:

- 11th Motorized Artillery Regiment
  - Command Unit
  - III Group with 75/18 mod. 35 howitzers
  - IV Group with 75/18 mod. 35 howitzers
  - XII Group with 105/28 cannons
  - CCCXIV Group with 100/22 mod. 14/19 howitzers
  - 363rd Anti-aircraft Battery with 20/65 mod. 35 anti-aircraft guns

The regiment's two groups with 100/22 mod. 14/19 howitzers remained with the 104th Infantry Division "Mantova". The I Motorized Grouping was assigned to the American II Corps and entered the front on 7 December 1943 during the Battle of San Pietro Infine. The grouping and the American 142nd Infantry Regiment were tasked with taking the summit of Monte Lungo, which was finally conquered on 16 December.

In March and early April 1944 the I Motorized Grouping conquered the summits of the Monte Marrone and Monte Mare. Afterwards the I Motorized Grouping was taken out of the front and assigned to the Italian Liberation Corps, which included the 184th Infantry Division "Nembo", and two brigades, which consisted of the 3rd Alpini Regiment and 4th Bersaglieri Regiment, respectively the 68th Infantry Regiment "Legnano" and the Royal Italian Navy's Regiment "San Marco". At the time the regiment was augmented with an additional group with 100/17 mod. 14 howitzers.

On 27 May 1944 the corps was assigned to the Polish II Corps and returned to the front. In July 1944 it participated in the Battle of Ancona. In September 1944 the II Brigade was renamed Combat Group "Legnano" and the 11th Motorized Artillery Regiment joined the combat group as 11th Field Artillery Regiment. The regiment was now organized as follows:

- 11th Field Artillery Regiment
  - Command Unit
  - I Group with QF 25-pounder field guns
  - II Group with QF 25-pounder field guns
  - III Group with QF 25-pounder field guns
  - IV Group with QF 25-pounder field guns
  - V Group with QF 17-pounder anti-tank guns
  - VI Group with 40/56 anti-aircraft autocannons
  - 2 × mobile workshops

The combat group entered the front as part of the Polish II Corps on the extreme left of the British 8th Army near the river Idice and was tasked with liberating Bologna. For its bravery and sacrifice during Italian campaign between 6 December 1943 and 30 April 1945 the regiment was awarded a Silver Medal of Military Valor, which was affixed on the regiment's flag and is depicted on the regiment's coats of arms.

=== Cold War ===
After the war the regiment was based in Brescia. On 15 October 1945 the Combat Group "Legnano" was reorganized as Infantry Division "Legnano". On 10 December 1946 the regiment ceded its II and III groups with QF 25-pounder field guns to help reform the Horse Artillery Regiment. On 1 April 1947 the regiment ceded its V Group with QF 17-pounder anti-tank guns to help reform the 13th Anti-tank Field Artillery Regiment and on 1 June of the same year the regiment ceded its VI Group with 40/56 anti-aircraft autocannons to help reform the 2nd Light Anti-aircraft Artillery Regiment. The same year the regiment moved from Brescia to Cremona. On 1 January 1951 the Infantry Division "Legnano" included the following artillery regiments:

- Infantry Division "Legnano", in Bergamo
  - Horse Artillery Regiment, in Milan
  - 11th Field Artillery Regiment, in Cremona
  - 27th Anti-tank Field Artillery Regiment, in Milan
  - 2nd Light Anti-aircraft Artillery Regiment, in Mantua

In March 1951 the regiment replaced its QF 25-pounder field guns with M101 105 mm howitzers. On 30 June 1951 the Italian Army's artillery was reorganized and the next day the regiment received a light anti-aircraft group with 40/56 anti-aircraft autocannons from the 2nd Light Anti-aircraft Artillery Regiment. On 1 June 1954 the regiment consisted of the following units:

- 11th Field Artillery Regiment, in Cremona
  - Command Unit
  - I Group with M101 105 mm towed howitzers
  - II Group with M101 105mm towed howitzers
  - IV Group with M114 155 mm howitzers
  - V Light Anti-aircraft Group with 40/56 anti-aircraft autocannons

In June 1955 the regiment formed a Light Aircraft Section with L-21B artillery observation planes, which in April 1956 was expanded to Light Aircraft Unit. In 1956 the Infantry Division "Legnano" transferred its Artillery Specialists Unit to the regiment, which expanded the unit in 1958 to Artillery Specialists Battery. On 1 May 1958 the regiment received the I Self-propelled Group with M7 Priest self-propelled guns from the 1st Armored Artillery Regiment "Pozzuolo del Friuli", which became the regiment's III Self-propelled Group. In 1960 the Light Aircraft Unit was disbanded. On 31 October 1964 the III Self-propelled Group with M7 Priest self-propelled guns was disbanded, but the next day the regiment received the II Self-propelled Group with M7 Priest self-propelled guns in Vercelli from the 131st Armored Artillery Regiment. Upon entering the regiment the new group was renumbered as III Self-propelled Group. On 1 October 1965 the V Light Anti-aircraft Group was placed in reserve status.

During the 1975 army reform the army disbanded the regimental level and newly independent battalions and groups were granted for the first time their own flags. On 1 October 1975 the regiment's I and II groups were disbanded. On 21 October the regiment's III Self-propelled Group became an autonomous unit, was reorganized and renamed 3rd Field Artillery Group "Pastrengo", and then assigned to the 3rd Mechanized Brigade "Goito". The same day the V Light Anti-aircraft Artillery Group, which remained a reserve formation, was renamed 11th Light Anti-aircraft Artillery Group "Falco" and transferred to the Armored Division "Centauro". On 29 October the regiment was disbanded and the next day the regiment's IV Group was reorganized and renamed 11th Field Artillery Group "Monferrato". To avoid confusion with the support units of the Mechanized Brigade "Legnano", the support units of the Mechanized Division "Mantova", and the 37th Mechanized Infantry Battalion "Ravenna" the group was named for the regiment's original name, the historical region of Monferrato in Piedmont. The group was assigned to the Mechanized Brigade "Legnano" and consisted of a command, a command and services battery, and three batteries with M114 155 mm howitzers.

On 12 November 1976 the President of the Italian Republic Giovanni Leone assigned with decree 846 the flag and traditions of the 11th Field Artillery Regiment to the group. At the time the group fielded 485 men (37 officers, 58 non-commissioned officers, and 390 soldiers).

=== Recent times ===
With the end of the Cold War the Italian Army began to draw down its forces and in 1990 one of the regiment's batteries was placed in reserve status. On 1 March 1991 the 52nd Field Artillery Group "Venaria" was transferred from the Mechanized Brigade "Brescia" to the Mechanized Brigade "Legnano", which now fielded two artillery groups. Consequently on 27 August 1991 the 11th Field Artillery Group "Monferrato" was disbanded and the flag of the 11th Field Artillery Regiment was transferred to the Shrine of the Flags in the Vittoriano in Rome.
