= Logistic Battalion "Legnano" =

Inactive Italian Army brigade logistics unit

- Battaglione Logistico "Legnano"
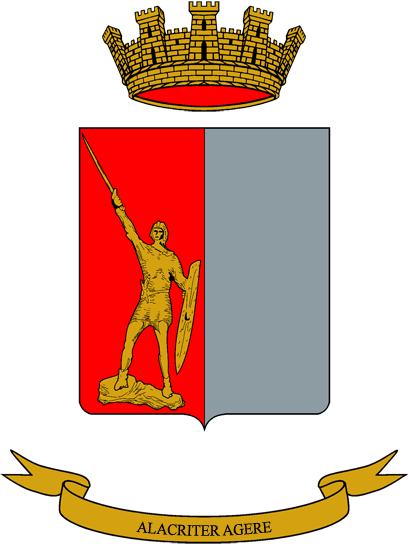
- Battalion coat of arms
- Active: 30 Oct. 1975 — 15 Oct. 1996
- Country: Italy
- Branch: Italian Army
- Type: Military logistics
- Part of: Mechanized Brigade "Legnano"
- Garrison/HQ: Presezzo
- Motto(s): "Alacriter agere"
- Anniversaries: 22 May 1916 - Battle of Asiago
- Decorations: 1× Silver Cross of Army Merit

Insignia
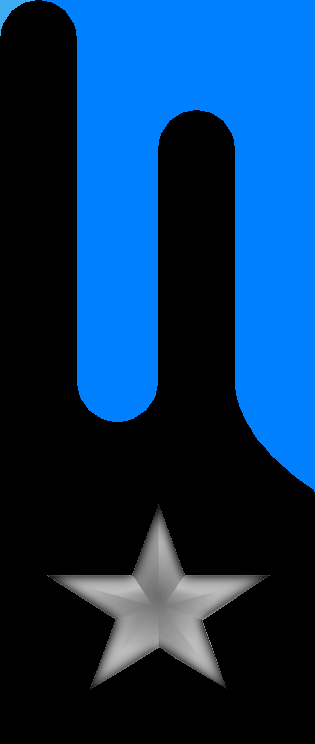
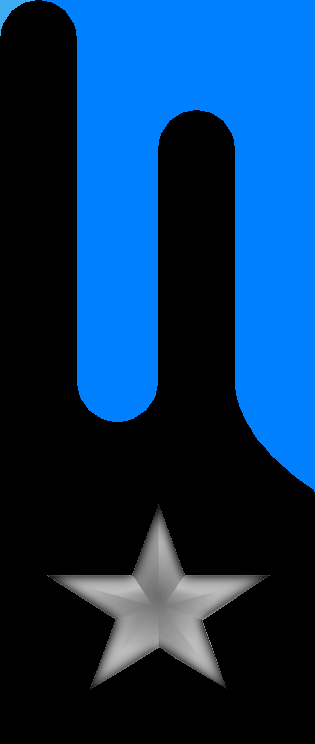
- Unit gorget patches

The Logistic Battalion "Legnano" (Italian: Battaglione Logistico "Legnano") is an inactive military logistics battalion of the Italian Army, which was assigned to the Mechanized Brigade "Legnano". The battalion's anniversary falls, as for all units of the Italian Army's Transport and Materiel Corps, on 22 May, the anniversary of the Royal Italian Army's first major use of automobiles to transport reinforcements to the Asiago plateau to counter the Austro-Hungarian Asiago Offensive in May 1916.

== History ==
The battalion is the spiritual successor of the logistic units of the Royal Italian Army's 58th Infantry Division "Legnano", which fought in the Italian invasion of France and Greco-Italian War of World War II, and of the logistic units of the Italian Co-belligerent Army's Combat Group "Legnano", which fought against the Germans during the Italian campaign and participated in the liberation of Bologna.

=== Cold War ===
On 15 October 1945, the Combat Group "Legnano" was reorganized as Infantry Division "Legnano". On 1 November 1956, the logistic units of the division were assigned to the newly formed Service Units Command "Legnano" in Bergamo. The command consisted of a medical section, a provisions section, a mobile vehicle park, a mobile workshop, an auto unit, and the 5th Field Hospital. On 1 October 1958, the mobile vehicle park, mobile workshop, and the light workshops of the division's regiments merged to form the Resupply, Repairs, Recovery Unit "Legnano".

On 1 June 1972, the Service Units Command "Legnano" in Presezzo was reorganized as Services Grouping Command "Legnano". The command consisted of a command, the Auto Unit "Legnano", the Provisions Company "Legnano", the Resupply, Repairs, Recovery Unit "Legnano", and the reserve Medical Battalion "Legnano", which consisted of the 5th Field Hospital and a medical company.

As part of the 1975 army reform the units of the Infantry Division "Legnano" were reorganized: on 21 October 1975, the Mechanized Brigade "Brescia" was formed in the city of Brescia. The "Brescia" brigade then left the "Legnano" division, which, on 30 October 1975, was reduced to Mechanized Brigade "Legnano". On the same date the division's services grouping command in Presezzo was reduced to Logistic Battalion "Legnano", which received the traditions of all preceding logistic, transport, medical, maintenance, and supply units bearing the name "Legnano". The battalion consisted of a command, a command platoon, a supply and transport company, a medium workshop, and a vehicle park. At the time the battalion fielded 651 men (37 officers, 82 non-commissioned officers, and 532 soldiers).

On 12 November 1976, the President of the Italian Republic Giovanni Leone granted with decree 846 the battalion a flag.

On 1 October 1981, the battalion was reorganized and consisted afterwards of the following units:

- Logistic Battalion "Legnano", in Presezzo
  - Command and Services Company
  - Supply Company
  - Maintenance Company
  - Medium Transport Company
  - Medical Unit (Reserve)

From August 1982 to February 1984, the battalion provided personnel and materiel for the Multinational Force in Lebanon, which was deployed to Lebanon.

=== Recent times ===
In 1991, the battalion moved from Presezzo to Solbiate Olona. From 22 August 1993 to 4 March 1994, the battalion participated in the United Nations Operation in Somalia II in Somalia. For its conduct and work in Somalia the battalion was awarded a Silver Cross of Army Merit, which was affixed to the battalion's flag.

On 15 October 1996, the Logistic Battalion "Legnano" was disbanded and the following 18 October the battalion's flag was transferred to the Shrine of the Flags in the Vittoriano in Rome for safekeeping.

== See also ==
- Military logistics
