= 68th Infantry Regiment "Legnano" =

Inactive Italian Army infantry unit

- 68° Reggimento Fanteria "Legnano"
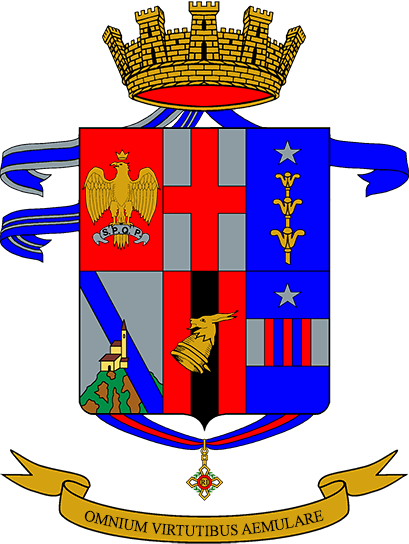
- Regimental coat of arms
- Active: 1 Aug. 1862 – 30 Nov. 1989
- Country: Italy
- Branch: Italian Army
- Part of: Mechanized Brigade "Legnano"
- Garrison/HQ: Bergamo
- Motto: "Omnium virtutibus aemulare"
- Anniversaries: 17 July 1944 – Battle of Musone
- Decorations: 1× Military Order of Italy; 1× Silver Medal of Military Valor; 1× Bronze Medal of Military Valor; 1× War Cross of Military Valor

Insignia
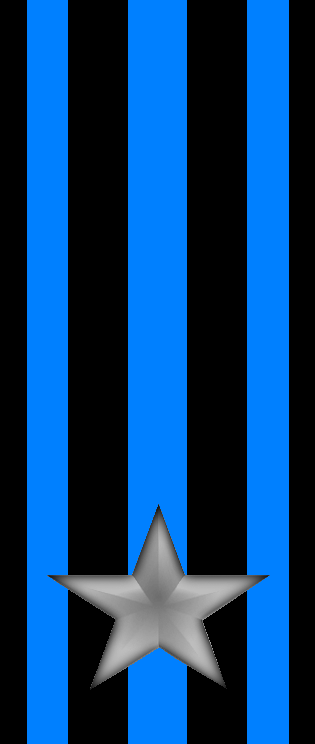
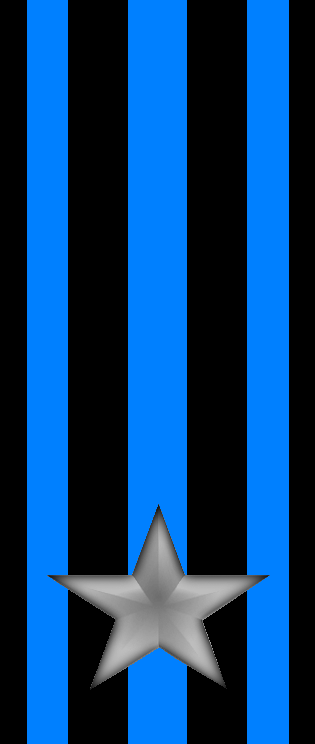
- Regimental gorget patches

The 68th Infantry Regiment "Legnano" (Italian: 68° Reggimento Fanteria "Legnano") is an inactive unit of the Italian Army last based in Bergamo. Formed in 1862 and originally named for the city of Palermo the regiment is part of the Italian Army's infantry arm. Since 1939 the regiment is named for the medieval Battle of Legnano.

The regiment was one of ten infantry regiments formed on 1 August 1862. In 1866 the regiment participated in the Third Italian War of Independence and 1911–12 in the Italo-Turkish War. During World War I the regiment fought on the Italian front and the Macedonian front. During World War II the regiment was assigned to the 58th Infantry Division "Legnano", with which it fought in the Greco-Italian War. The regiment had just arrived in Apulia in southern Italy, when the Armistice of Cassibile was announced on 8 September 1943. The regiment immediately clashed with invading German forces. The regiment joined the Italian Co-belligerent Army and on 27 January 1944 was assigned to the I Motorized Grouping, with which it participated in the Italian campaign. After the war the regiment was assigned to the Infantry Division "Legnano". In 1975 the regiment was disbanded and its flag and traditions assigned to a battalion sized unit, which was disbanded in 1989.

== History ==
=== Formation ===
On 1 August 1862 the 27th Infantry Regiment (Brigade "Pavia"), 28th Infantry Regiment (Brigade "Pavia"), 59th Infantry Regiment (Brigade "Calabria"), 60th Infantry Regiment (Brigade "Calabria"), 61st Infantry Regiment (Brigade "Sicilia"), and 62nd Infantry Regiment (Brigade "Sicilia") ceded their 17th Company and 18th Company to help form the 68th Infantry Regiment (Brigade "Palermo") in Turin. The twelve companies were grouped into three battalions. On the same date the 14th Infantry Regiment (Brigade "Pinerolo") and the 43rd Infantry Regiment (Brigade "Forlì") ceded both a depot company to help form the new regiment's depot in Turin, while the 4th Provisional Depot in Milazzo and 6th Provisional Depot Syracuse provided each two companies to form the regiment's IV Battalion, which initially remained based in Catania.

The regiment was assigned, together with the 67th Infantry Regiment, to the Brigade "Palermo" in Turin. The brigade's command and the 67th Infantry Regiment had also been formed on 1 August 1962.

In 1867–69 the regiment operated in Sicily in southern Italy to suppress the anti-Sardinian revolt, which had erupted after the Kingdom of Sardinia had annexed the Kingdom of Two Sicilies in 1862. In 1866 the regiment participated in the Third Italian War of Independence. On 25 October 1871 the brigade level was abolished and the two regiments of the Brigade "Palermo" were renamed 67th Infantry Regiment "Palermo", respectively 68th Infantry Regiment "Palermo". On 2 January 1881 the brigade level was reintroduced and the two regiments were renamed again as 67th Infantry Regiment (Brigade "Palermo") and 68th Infantry Regiment (Brigade "Palermo").

On 1 November 1884 the regiment ceded some of its companies to help form the 88th Infantry Regiment (Brigade "Friuli") in Milan. In 1895–96 the regiment provided nine officers and 249 enlisted for units deployed to Italian Eritrea for the First Italo-Ethiopian War.

=== Italo-Turkish War ===
In 1911 the regiment was deployed to Libya for the Italo-Turkish War. On 28 November 1911 a battalion of the regiment fought in the Battle of Koefia. In 1912 the regiment operated in the area of Benghazi and fought in the battles and skirmishes of Benghazi. In 1913 the regiment was repatriated, but left its II Battalion in Libya until the end of the year.

=== World War I ===
At the outbreak of World War I, the Brigade "Palermo" formed, together with the Brigade "Cuneo" and the 27th Field Artillery Regiment, the 5th Division. At the time the 68th Infantry Regiment consisted of three battalions, each of which fielded four fusilier companies and one machine gun section. On 22 November 1914, the depot of the 68th Infantry Regiment in Milan formed the brigade command of the Brigade "Milano" and the 159th Infantry Regiment (Brigade "Milano"). After Italy's entry into the war on 23 May 1915 the Brigade "Palermo" was deployed to the Italian front: until October 1915 the brigade fought against Austro-Hungarian forces in the Val Camonica valley in the Tonale Pass area. In November of the same year the brigade was on the Karst plateau, where it fought in the Fourth Battle of the Isonzo, with the 68th Infantry Regiment deployed in San Martino del Carso.

In March 1916 the brigade fought in the Fifth Battle of the Isonzo in the Tolmin sector in the Tolmin sector, where it tried to take the hills of Bučenica and Mengore. On 18 May 1916 the 68th Infantry Regiment's depot in Milan formed the command and two companies of I Battalion of the 225th Infantry Regiment (Brigade "Arezzo"). In May 1917 the brigade fought in the Tenth Battle of the Isonzo for the summit of Sveta Gora near Gorizia. In July 1917 the regiment's depot in Milan formed the 273rd Infantry Regiment (Brigade "Potenza"). In August 1917 the brigade fought in the Eleventh Battle of the Isonzo on Mount Škabrijel. In October and November 1917 the brigade fought rearguard actions during the Italian retreat after the Battle of Caporetto.

In June 1918 the brigade fought in the Second Battle of the Piave River in the area of Nervesa. On 13 September 1918 the brigade was shipped from Taranto to Vlorë in Albania to participate in the last offensive on the Macedonian front. On 18 September the brigade assembled at Vlorë and then entered the front. In October 1918 the brigade pursued the retreating Austro-Hungarians, liberating Durrës on 15 October and Shkodër on 1 November.

After the war the brigade remained in Albania until the Italian protectorate of Albania ended in 1920. For its conduct during the war the two regiments of the Brigade "Palermo" were both awarded a Bronze Medal of Military Valor.

=== Interwar years ===
On 27 October 1926 the 68th Infantry Regiment, now renamed 68th Infantry Regiment "Palermo", was assigned to the II Infantry Brigade, which was the infantry component of the 2nd Territorial Division of Novara. On 1 November 1926 the command of the Brigade "Palermo" was disbanded and the 67th Infantry Regiment, now renamed 67th Infantry Regiment "Palermo", was assigned to the VI Infantry Brigade, which was the infantry component of the 6th Territorial Division of Milan. The same year the regiment moved from Milan to Novara.

In 1934 the 2nd Territorial Division of Novara changed its name to 2nd Infantry Division "Sforzesca" to commemorate the Battle of Sforzesca in 1849, while the 6th Territorial Division of Milan changed its name to 6th Infantry Division "Legnano" to commemorate the Battle of Legnano in 1176. The name changes also extended to the two divisions' infantry brigades. In 1935–36 the regiment provided 5 officers and 95 enlisted for units deployed for the Second Italo-Ethiopian War.

On 24 May 1939 the 6th Infantry Division "Legnano" was renamed 6th Infantry Division "Cuneo" and transferred the "Legnano" name, together with the 67th Infantry Regiment "Palermo", to the newly formed 58th Infantry Division "Legnano", which was based in the city of Legnano. On the same date the Legnano division received the 68th Infantry Regiment "Palermo" from the 2nd Infantry Division "Sforzesca", and formed the 58th Artillery Regiment "Legano". On the same date all two infantry regiments changed their names from "Palermo" to "Legano". On 1 January 1940 the regiment moved from Novara to Legnano.

=== World War II ===
==== Greco-Italian War ====
At the outbreak of World War II the regiment consisted of a command, a command company, three fusilier battalions, a support weapons battery equipped with 65/17 infantry support guns, and a mortar company equipped with 81mm Mod. 35 mortars. In June 1940 the Legnano division was in the army reserve during the Italian invasion of France. In early January 1941 the division was transferred to Albania to reinforce the Italian front in the Greco-Italian War. On 7 January 1941 the Legnano entered the front in the sector along the coast. On 26 January the division fought in the Battle of Trebeshina. After Greek units withdrew from the Albanian front during the Battle of Greece, the Legnano advanced and reached Këlcyrë on 16 April 1941 from where it advanced to Kuman. On 21 June the division began boarding ships in Vlorë for the return to Lombardy. For their conduct during the Greco-Italian War the two infantry regiments of the Legnano division were each awarded a War Cross of Military Valor, which were affixed to the regiments' flags and are depicted on the regiments' coats of arms.

In November 1942 the division participated in the occupation of Vichy France and was then deployed for coastal defence duty in the Cannes-Saint-Tropez sector of the Italian occupation zone.

==== Italian campaign ====
In August 1943 the Legnano division was ordered to move to Apulia in the South of Italy. The division's units were moved by rail through Bologna and then to Brindisi. After the Armistice of Cassibile was announced on 8 September 1943, some units were already at Brindisi and Francavilla Fontana, while others were stranded in Bologna or in locations on the way to their destination. The 68th Infantry Regiment "Legnano", with the exception of the support weapons battery, had made it to Brindisi and heard the news of the armistice at Ostuni near Brindisi. Together with the 152nd Infantry Division "Piceno", the 210th Coastal Division, and the XXXI Coastal Brigade the units of the Legnano in Apulia deployed to form a defensive line from Taranto through Grottaglie, Francavilla Fontana, and Latiano to Brindisi, to screen the landing of the British 1st Airborne Division at Taranto on 9 September from attacks of the German 1st Fallschirmjäger Division.

On 27 January 1944 the 68th Infantry Regiment "Legnano", which at the time consisted of two battalions, replaced the 67th Motorized Infantry Regiment "Legnano" in the Italian Co-belligerent Army's I Motorized Grouping, which had been fighting on the allied side in the Italian campaign since September 1943. On 17 February 1944 the Legnano division's was officially disbanded. On 22 March 1944 the I Motorized Grouping was reorganized as Italian Liberation Corps and the 68th Infantry Regiment "Legnano" joined the corps' II Brigade. On 31 March 1944 the regiment fought on Monte Marrone. On 18 April the regiment formed a third battalion and in July the regiment fought on the Musone river during the Battle of Ancona.

On 24 September 1944 the II Brigade of the Italian Liberation Corps was reorganized and renamed Combat Group "Legnano". The regiment now consisted of a command, a command company, the I Battalion "Palermo", the II Battalion "Novara", III Battalion "Col Moschin", a mortar company equipped with British ML 3-inch mortars, and a cannons company with British QF 6-pounder anti-tank guns. On 1 October 1944 the combat group formed a second infantry regiment, which was named Special Infantry Regiment "Legnano" and consisted of the remnants of the 3rd Alpini Regiment and 4th Bersaglieri Regiment.

The Combat Group "Legnano" was assigned to the Polish II Corps on the left of the British 8th Army near the river Idice. In March 1945 the combat group fought along the Idice river and in April in the Battle of Bologna. After the Axis surrender in Italy the regiment advanced to Brescia, which was liberated on 29 April 1945.

For its conduct during the Italian campaign the regiment was awarded a Silver Medal of Military Valor.

=== Cold War ===
After the war the combat group and the 68th Infantry Regiment "Legnano" were based in Bergamo, while the Special Infantry Regiment "Legnano" was based in Legnano. At the time the 68th Infantry Regiment "Legnano" consisted of a command, a command company, two fusilier battalions, the III Battalion "Col Moschin", a mortar company equipped with 81mm Mod. 35 mortars, and an anti-tank cannons company equipped with QF 6-pounder anti-tank guns. Meanwhile the 67th Infantry Regiment "Legnano" was still in the South of Italy, where the regiment either disbanded its units or transferred them to other commands. By August 1945 only the regimental command of the 67th Infantry Regiment "Legnano" remained active. On 15 October 1945 the Combat Group "Legnano" was renamed Infantry Division "Legnano".

In early 1946 the regimental command of the 67th Infantry Regiment "Legnano" moved to Legnano, where on 30 June 1946 the Special Infantry Regiment "Legnano" was disbanded. The next day the regimental command of the 67th Infantry Regiment "Legnano" took command of the units of the disbanded Special Infantry Regiment "Legnano" and took the regiment's place in the Infantry Division "Legnano". On 1 August the III Battalion "Col Moschin" was disbanded and its personnel used to form the III Fusiliers Battalion of the 68th Infantry Regiment "Legnano". On 31 October of the same year the cannons company was disbanded. By the 1960s the 68th Infantry Regiment "Legnano" had formed the IV Mechanized Battalion and an anti-tank company. At the time the regiment consisted of the following units:

- 68th Infantry Regiment "Legnano", in Bergamo
  - Command and Services Company, in Bergamo
  - I Battalion, in Bergamo
  - II Battalion, in Como
  - III Battalion, in Brescia
  - IV Mechanized Battalion, in Monza
  - Anti-tank Company, in Monza

During the 1975 army reform the army disbanded the regimental level and newly independent battalions were granted for the first time their own flags. On 1 September 1975, the regiment's II Battalion in Como was reorganized and renamed 23rd Infantry Battalion "Como", while the regiment's III Battalion in Brescia was reorganized and renamed on the same date 20th Mechanized Infantry Battalion "Monte San Michele". On 29 October 1975, the 68th Infantry Regiment "Legnano" was disbanded. The next day the regiment's I Battalion in Bergamo became an autonomous unit and was renamed 68th Mechanized Infantry Battalion "Palermo" and assigned the flag and traditions of the 68th Infantry Regiment "Legnano". On the same date, the regiment's IV Mechanized Battalion in Monza became an autonomous unit and was renamed 67th Mechanized Infantry Battalion "Montelungo" and assigned the flag and traditions of the 67th Infantry Regiment "Legnano". To avoid confusion with the Mechanized Brigade "Legnano" the battalion's name was changed from "Legnano" to its original name "Palermo".

The battalion was assigned to the Mechanized Brigade "Legnano" and consisted of a command, a command and services company, three mechanized companies with M113 armored personnel carriers, and a heavy mortar company with M106 mortar carriers with 120mm Mod. 63 mortars. At the time the battalion fielded 896 men (45 officers, 100 non-commissioned officers, and 751 soldiers).

On 30 November 1989 the 68th Mechanized Infantry Battalion "Palermo" was disbanded and on 15 December the flag of the 68th Infantry Regiment "Legnano" was transferred to the Shrine of the Flags in the Vittoriano in Rome.

== See also ==
- Mechanized Brigade "Legnano"
