= Mechanized Brigade "Legnano" =

Brigata Meccanizzata "Legnano"
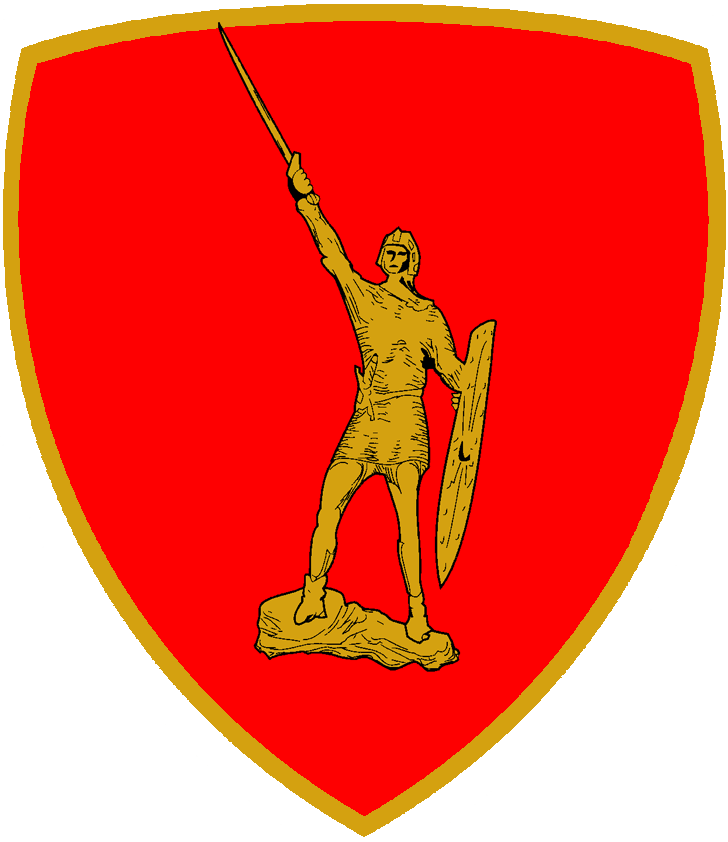
- Coat of Arms of the Mechanized Brigade "Legnano"
- Active: 31 October 1975 – 31 December 1997
- Country: Italy
- Branch: Italian Army
- Type: Infantry
- Role: Armored warfare
- Part of: 1975–1986 armored Division "Centauro"; 1986–1997 3rd Army Corps
- Garrison/HQ: Bergamo

The Mechanized Brigade "Legnano" was a mechanized brigade of the Italian Army. Its core units were mechanized infantry battalions. The brigade's headquarters was in the city of Bergamo in Lombardy. The name of the brigade commemorates the Lombard League victory in the Battle of Legnano in 1176 and its coat of arms depicts the Monument to the Warrior of Legnano in the centre of Legnano.

== History ==
=== World War II ===
The Legnano was activated as an infantry division on 8 February 1934. Initially the division consisted of the 7th Infantry Regiment "Cuneo", 8th Infantry Regiment "Cuneo", 67th Infantry Regiment "Palermo" and 27th Field Artillery Regiment. On 24 March 1939 the division was split into the 6th Infantry Division "Cuneo" and 58th Infantry Division "Legnano". After the split the "Legnano" fielded the 67th Infantry Regiment "Palermo", 68th Infantry Regiment "Palermo" and 58th Artillery Regiment.

In 1940 the division remained in Fenestrelle as a reserve force during the Italian invasion of southern France. After the Italian invasion of Greece in October 1940 bogged down under stiff Greek resistance the "Legnano" division was dispatched to Albania in January 1941 to augment the Italian forces under pressure by the Greek counteroffensive.

In November 1942 the division participated in the occupation of Vichy France and remained afterwards in France on occupation duty. In August 1943 the division returned to Italy - first to Bologna and then to Brindisi in the South of Italy. After Allied forces had landed on the Italian peninsula and an armistice between Italy and the Allies had been signed, the division stayed loyal to the Italian King Victor Emmanuel III, who fled with the royal court from Rome to Brindisi.

==== I Motorized Grouping ====
Already on 26 September 1943 parts of the division were used to form the I Motorized Grouping (Italian: 1° Raggruppamento Motorizzato), which was to aid in the allied war effort. The I Motorized Grouping consisted of the following units:

- I Motorized Grouping (formed with officers and troops of the 58th Infantry Division "Legnano" Command Group)
  - 67th Infantry Regiment "Palermo"
    - Command Company
    - I Battalion/67th Infantry Regiment
    - I Battalion/93rd Infantry Regiment (from the 18th Infantry Division "Messina")
    - LI Bersaglieri Officer Cadets Training Battalion
    - 281st Anti-tank Company (S-18/1000 anti-tank rifles)
  - V Anti-tank Battalion (newly formed)
    - 1st Tank Company (L6/40 light tanks)
    - 16th Anti-tank Cannons Company (47/32 mod. 1935 anti-tank cannons)
    - 56th Anti-tank Cannons Company (47/32 mod. 1935 anti-tank cannons)
  - 11th Motorized Artillery Regiment (from the 104th Motorized Division "Mantova")
    - Command Unit
    - III Group with 75/18 mod. 35 howitzers
    - IV Group with 75/18 mod. 35 howitzers
    - XII Group with 105/28 cannons
    - CCCXIV Group with 100/22 mod. 14/19 howitzers
    - 363rd Anti-aircraft Battery with 20/65 mod. 35 anti-aircraft guns
  - Mixed Engineer Company
    - 1st Telegraphers Engineer Platoon
    - 1st Radiotelegraphers Engineer Platoon
    - 1st Signal Engineer Platoon
  - Services (logistic, medical, transport, etc. units)

In the next months the division lost all its units, which were needed on the front lines. On 17 February 1944 the division was deactivated after its last units had joined other units.

==== Combat Group "Legnano ====
On 24 September 1944 the II Brigade of the Italian Liberation Corps ("Corpo Italiano di Liberazione", or CIL), was renamed as Combat Group "Legnano". The Combat Group consisted of the 68th Infantry Regiment "Palermo", the 11th Motorized Artillery Regiment, the elite IX Assault Unit and the Special Infantry Regiment "Legnano", which consisted of the remnants of the 3rd Alpini Regiment and 4th Bersaglieri Regiment. The Combat Group was equipped with British weapons and materiel. The combat group's structure when it entered the front was:

Combat Group "Legnano" organization

- Combat Group "Legnano"
  - Command Company
  - British Eighth Army Liaison Squad
  - 68th Infantry Regiment "Legnano"
    - Command Company
    - I Battalion "Palermo"
    - II Battalion "Novara"
    - I Assault Battalion "Col Moschin" (former IX Assault Unit)
    - Anti-tank Company (QF 6-pounder anti-tank guns)
    - Mortar Company (ML 3-inch mortars)
  - Special Infantry Regiment "Legnano"
    - Command Company
    - Bersaglieri Battalion "Goito"
    - Alpini Battalion "Piemonte"
    - Alpini Battalion "Abruzzi" (renamed Alpini Battalion "L'Aquila" on 25 November 1944)
    - Anti-tank Company (QF 6-pounder anti-tank guns)
    - Mortar Company (ML 3-inch mortars)
  - 11th Artillery Regiment
    - Command Unit
    - I Group (QF 25-pounder field guns)
    - II Group (QF 25-pounder field guns)
    - III Group (QF 25-pounder field guns)
    - IV Group (QF 25-pounder field guns)
    - V Anti-tank Group (QF 17-pounder anti-tank guns)
    - VI Anti-aircraft Group (QF 40mm anti-aircraft guns)
  - LI Mixed Engineer Battalion
    - 3rd Engineer Company
    - 51st Engineer Company
    - 51st Teleradio Company
  - Transport and Supply Company
  - Mobile Artillery and Engineer Materiel Depot
  - Medical Section
    - 2 x Field hospitals
    - 1 x Surgical unit
  - Bakers Section
  - Maintenance Workshop
  - 2 x Carabinieri sections

The Legnano entered the front as part of the Polish II Corps on the extreme left of the British 8th Army near the river Idice and was tasked with liberating Bologna.

=== Infantry Division "Legnano" ===
After the war the combat group was garrisoned in Bergamo. When the 67th Infantry Regiment "Palermo" returned to the combat group on 15 October 1945 the group became once more the Infantry Division "Legnano". The division also received the 3rd Cavaliers Reconnaissance Group. In 1947 the two infantry regiments changed their name from "Palermo" to "Legnano" and the division was augmented with the Horse Artillery Regiment.

In the next years the division was motorized with American equipment and the 3rd Cavaliers Reconnaissance Group was increased to full regiment with three battalions of armored and mechanized cavalry. The division was the only major unit of the III Territorial Military Command in Milan until the command became the III Army Corps on 1 July 1957. Subsequently, the Armored Division "Centauro" in Novara, the Infantry Division "Cremona" and Alpine Brigade "Taurinense" both based in Turin entered the III Army Corps.

On 1 May 1958 the 4th Armored Infantry Regiment joined the division. The regiment consisted of the XX Tank Battalion with M47 Patton tanks and the II Bersaglieri Battalion. At the same time the 3rd Cavalry Regiment was reduced to Reconnaissance Group "Legnano". After the four artillery groups of the 11th Artillery Regiment had been re-equipped with M101 105 mm and M114 155 mm howitzers, the Horse Artillery Regiment was transferred to the III Army Corps.

The structure of the division before the 1975 reform was as follows:

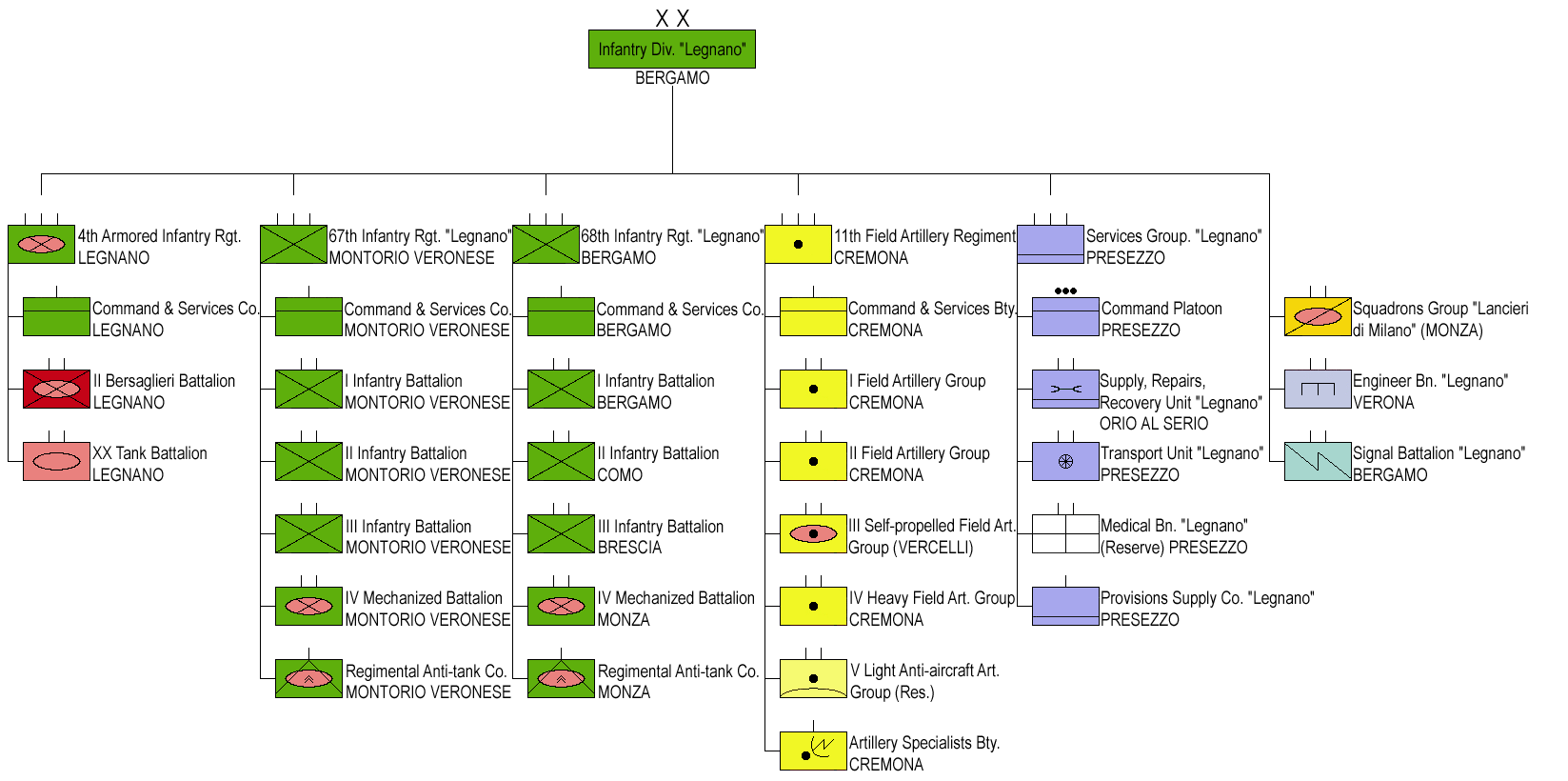
Infantry Division "Legnano" in 1974

- Infantry Division "Legnano", in Bergamo
  - 4th Armored Infantry Regiment, in Legnano
    - Command and Services Company, in Legnano (includes an anti-tank guided missile platoon)
    - II Bersaglieri Battalion, in Legnano (M113 armored personnel carriers)
    - XX Tank Battalion, in Legnano (M47 Patton tanks)
  - 67th Infantry Regiment "Legnano", in Montorio Veronese
    - Command and Services Company, in Montorio Veronese
    - I Infantry Battalion, in Montorio Veronese
    - II Infantry Battalion, in Montorio Veronese
    - III Infantry Battalion, in Montorio Veronese
    - IV Mechanized Battalion, in Montorio Veronese (M113 armored personnel carriers and M47 tanks)
    - Regimental Anti-tank Company, in Montorio Veronese (anti-tank guided missiles and M47 tanks)
  - 68th Infantry Regiment "Legnano", in Bergamo
    - Command and Services Company, in Bergamo
    - I Infantry Battalion, in Bergamo
    - II Infantry Battalion, in Como
    - III Infantry Battalion, in Brescia
    - IV Mechanized Battalion, in Monza (M113 armored personnel carriers and M47 tanks)
    - Regimental Anti-tank Company, in Monza (anti-tank guided missiles and M47 tanks)
  - 11th Field Artillery Regiment, in Cremona
    - Command and Services Battery, in Cremona
    - I Field Artillery Group, in Cremona (M14/61 105 mm towed howitzers)
    - II Field Artillery Group, in Cremona (M14/61 105mm towed howitzers)
    - III Self-propelled Field Artillery Group, in Vercelli (M7 105 mm self-propelled howitzers)
    - IV Heavy Field Artillery Group, in Cremona (M114 155 mm towed howitzers)
    - V Light Anti-aircraft Artillery Group (Reserve), in (?) (Bofors 40 mm anti-aircraft guns and 12.7mm anti-aircraft machine guns)
    - Artillery Specialists Battery, in Cremona
  - "Lancieri di Milano" Squadrons Group, in Monza (Fiat Campagnola reconnaissance vehicles and M47 Patton tanks)
  - Engineer Battalion "Legnano", in Verona
  - Signal Battalion "Legnano", in Bergamo
  - Services Grouping "Legnano", in Presezzo
    - Command Platoon, in Presezzo
    - Supply, Repairs, Recovery Unit "Legnano", in Orio al Serio
    - Transport Unit "Legnano", in Presezzo
    - Medical Battalion "Legnano" (Reserve), in Presezzo (includes the 5th Field Hospital)
    - Provisions Supply Company "Legnano", in Presezzo

The Light Aviation Unit "Legnano", at Bergamo-Orio al Serio Air Base was disbanded on 16 July 1972.

=== Mechanized Brigade "Legnano" ===
In 1975 the Italian Army undertook a major reorganization of it forces: the regimental level was abolished and battalions came under direct command of multi-arms brigades. Therefore, on 29 October 1975 the Infantry Division "Legnano" was split to form the Mechanized Brigade "Legnano" in Bergamo and the Mechanized Brigade "Brescia" in Brescia. The I and IV battalions of the 68th Infantry Regiment "Legnano" and the battalions of the 4th Armored Infantry Regiment were used to form the "Legnano" brigade. The I and III battalion of the 67th Infantry Regiment along with the III Battalion of the 68th Infantry Regiment were used to form the Mechanized Brigade "Brescia".

The 11th Field Artillery Regiment and its I and II groups were disbanded, while the III group was transferred to the 3rd Mechanized Brigade "Goito". The IV Heavy Field Artillery Group became the 11th Field Artillery Group "Monferrato" and remained with the "Legnano" brigade. The VII Reconnaissance Squadrons Group "Lancieri di Milano" was transferred to the Mechanized Division "Mantova", while the division's Signal Battalion, Engineer Battalion and Services Grouping were split among the two new brigades. After the reform the Legnano's authorized strength was 4,733 men (272 Officers, 637 non-commissioned officers and 3,824 soldiers) and it joined the Armored Division "Centauro". After the reform the brigade consisted of the following units:

- Mechanized Brigade "Legnano", in Bergamo
  - Command and Signal Unit "Legnano", in Bergamo
  - 2nd Bersaglieri Battalion "Governolo", in Legnano
  - 67th Mechanized Infantry Battalion "Montelungo", in Monza
  - 68th Mechanized Infantry Battalion "Palermo", in Bergamo
  - 20th Tank Battalion "M.O. Pentimalli", in Legnano (Leopard 1A2 main battle tanks)
  - 11th Field Artillery Group "Monferrato", in Cremona (M114 155 mm towed howitzers)
  - Logistic Battalion "Legnano", in Presezzo
  - Anti-tank Company "Legnano", in Monza (BGM-71 TOW anti-tank guided missiles)
  - Engineer Company "Legnano", Bergamo

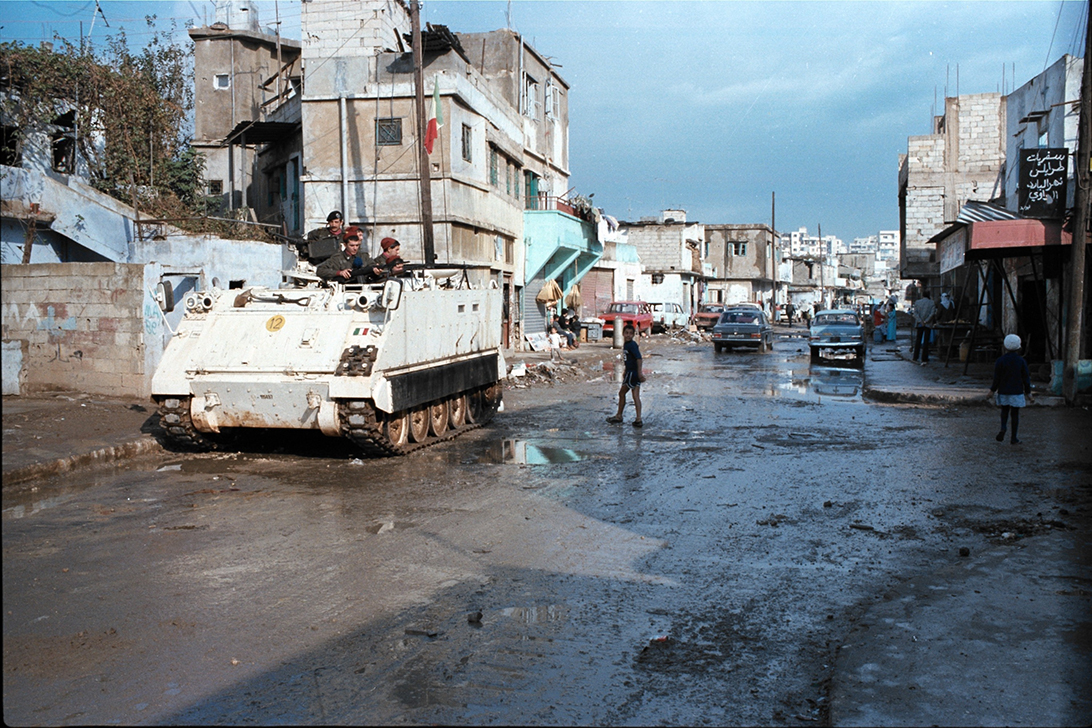
Soldiers of the 2nd Bersaglieri Battalion "Governolo" on patrol with the Multinational Force in Lebanon in 1982

In 1982 and 1983 the brigade provided personnel for the Italian contingent of the Multinational Force in Lebanon. In 1986 the Italian Army abolished the divisional level and the Legnano came under direct command of the 3rd Army Corps. On 30 November 1989 the 68th Mechanized Infantry Battalion "Palermo" was disbanded.

After the end of the Cold War the Italian Army began to draw down its forces and therefore starting in 1991 the Legnano received and lost units repeatedly over the coming years: In June 1991 the brigade received the 4th Tank Battalion "M.O. Passalacqua" and 18th Bersaglieri Battalion "Poggio Scanno" from the disbanded Mechanized Brigade "Goito". The same year the Legnano received the 52nd Field Artillery Group "Venaria" from the disbanded Mechanized Brigade "Brescia", while the 11th Field Artillery Group "Monferrato" was disbanded on 27 August 1991. On 27 August 1992 the 4th Tank Battalion "M.O. Passalacqua" merged with the 67th Mechanized Infantry Battalion "Montelungo" to form the 67th Armored Infantry Regiment "Legnano". In 1993 the brigade provided troops for the United Nations Operation in Somalia II. At the same time the remaining battalions of the brigade returned to use their name regimental names for traditional reasons without changing their composition or size.

In 1995 the Army began a further round of cuts which included the Legnano and so on 5 October 1995 the 67th Armored Infantry Regiment "Legnano" was disbanded. The same year the brigade transferred the 4th Tank Regiment and 52nd Self-propelled Field Artillery Regiment to the Armored Brigade "Centauro", followed in 1996 by the 2nd Bersaglieri and 3rd Bersaglieri regiments.

=== Support Units Command "Legnano" ===
On 16 September 1996 the brigade became the Support Units Command "Legnano" with the following units of the 3rd Army Corps:

- Support Units Command "Legnano", in Bergamo
  - Command and Services Unit "Legnano", in Bergamo
  - Regiment "Nizza Cavalleria" (1st), in Pinerolo (transferred to the Armored Brigade "Centauro" on 15 October 1997)
  - 26th Infantry (Recruits Training) Regiment "Bergamo", in Diano Castello
  - Lagunari Regiment "Serenissima", in Venezia-Lido
  - Horse Artillery Regiment "Voloire", in Milan
  - 10th Engineer Regiment, in Cremona
  - 1st Signal Regiment, in Milan
  - 33rd Logistic Regiment "Ambrosiano", in Solbiate Olona
  - 3rd Army Aviation Regiment "Aldebaran", in Bresso (disbanded 1 September 1998)

But already on 31 December 1997 the Support Units Command "Legnano" was disbanded and its units came under direct command of the 3rd Army Corps.
