= IX Army Corps (Italy) =

The IX Army Corps (Italian: IX Corpo d'Armata) was a corps of the Royal Italian Army between 1877 and 1944.

== History ==
the IX Army Corps participated in World War I.

In 1940, the IX Corps was assigned to defend the south-eastern coast between Pescara and Lecce. The headquarters were located in Putignano in the province of Bari.
The Corps remained here for the duration of the war, and after the Armistice of Cassibile on 8 September 1943, the Corps moved to Brindisi in Apulia to escape capture by the Germans.
On 15 September 1943, it was renamed LI Army Corps to fight alongside the Allies, but this never came into effect.

1944 - On 1 July 1944, it assumed the name of Military Command of Apulia and Lucania, with airport defense tasks around the harbours of Taranto and Brindisi.

== World War I composition ==
- IX Army Corps — Lieutenant General Pietro Marini
  - 17th Division — Major General Diomede Saveri
    - Brigade "Reggio"
      - 45th Infantry Regiment (Battalions I-III)
      - 46th Infantry Regiment (Battalions I-III)
    - Brigade "Torino"
      - 81st Infantry Regiment (Battalions I-III)
      - 82nd Infantry Regiment (Battalions IV, V, VI — the regiment's I, II, and III battalions were deployed overseas and the IV, V, and VI battalions had been formed as replacement)
    - 13th Field Artillery Regiment (8 × batteries with 75/27 mod. 11 field guns) (arrived 31 May)
    - 5th Company, 1st Engineer Regiment (Sappers)
  - 18th Division — Major General Vittorio Carpi
    - Brigade "Alpi"
      - 51st Infantry Regiment (Battalions I-III)
      - 52nd Infantry Regiment (Battalions II-IV — the regiment's I Battalion was deployed overseas and the IV Battalion had been formed as replacement)
    - Brigade "Calabria"
      - 59th Infantry Regiment (Battalions I-III)
      - 60th Infantry Regiment (Battalions II-IV — the regiment's I Battalion was deployed overseas and the IV Battalion had been formed as replacement)
    - 33rd Field Artillery Regiment (8 × batteries with 75/27 mod. 11 field guns)
    - 8th Company, 1st Engineer Regiment (Sappers)
  - Corps Troops
    - 3rd Bersaglieri Regiment (Battalions XVIII, XX, XXV)
    - 3rd Alpini Regiment (Alpini battalions operated independently of their regiments)
      - Regular Alpini battalions: Alpini Battalion "Fenestrelle", Alpini Battalion "Pieve di Cadore", Alpini Battalion "Belluno"
      - Territorial Militia Alpini battalions: Alpini Battalion "Val Chisone", Alpini Battalion "Val Piave", Alpini Battalion "Val Cordevole"
    - Regiment "Lancieri di Firenze" (9th) (5 × cavalry squadrons) (arrived 5 June)
    - 1st Field Artillery Regiment (8 × batteries with 75/27 mod. 11 field guns) (arrived 26 May)
    - Mountain Artillery Group "Torino-Susa", 1st Mountain Artillery Regiment (2 × batteries with 65/17 mod. 13)
    - Mountain Artillery Group "Belluno", 2nd Mountain Artillery Regiment (4 × batteries with 65/17 mod. 13 mountain guns)
    - Mountain Artillery Group "Como", 3rd Mountain Artillery Regiment (3 × batteries with 65/17 mod. 13 mountain guns)
    - 5th Telegraphers Company, 3rd Engineer Regiment (Telegraphers)

== Composition (1940-1943) ==
- 47th Infantry Division "Bari" (June 1941 - September 1942)
- 152nd Infantry Division "Piceno" (1942-1943)
- 58th Infantry Division "Legnano" (1943)
- 209th Coastal Division (1943-1945)
- 210th Coastal Division (1943-1945)

== Commanders ==
- Luigi Segato (1915.06.20 - 1915.10.29)
- Emilio De Bono (1918.03 – 1919.01)
- Quirino Armellini (1942.08.05 – 1943.07.29)
- Roberto Lerici (1943.07.30 – 1943.09.08)
- Gen. C. Ismaele Di Nisio
