= 9th Paratroopers Assault Regiment "Col Moschin" =

Active Italian Army special forces unit

- 9° Reggimento d'Assalto Paracadutisti "Col Moschin"
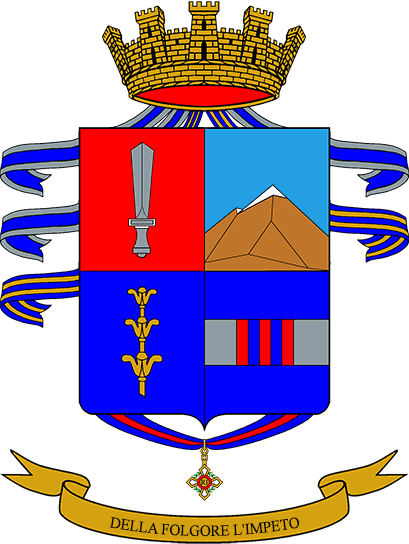
- Regimental coat of arms
- Active: 20 July 1942 — 9 Sept. 1943; 1 Oct. 1975 — today
- Country: Italy
- Branch: Italian Army
- Type: Special Forces
- Part of: Army Special Forces Command
- Garrison/HQ: Livorno
- Motto: "Della folgore l'impeto"
- Anniversaries: 16 June 1918 - Battle of Col Moschin
- Decorations: 3x Military Order of Italy; 3x Silver Medals of Military Valor; 1x Gold Medal of Army Valor; 1x Silver Medal of Army Valor

Insignia
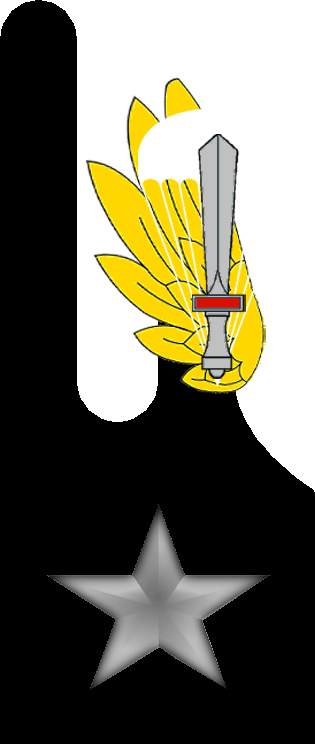
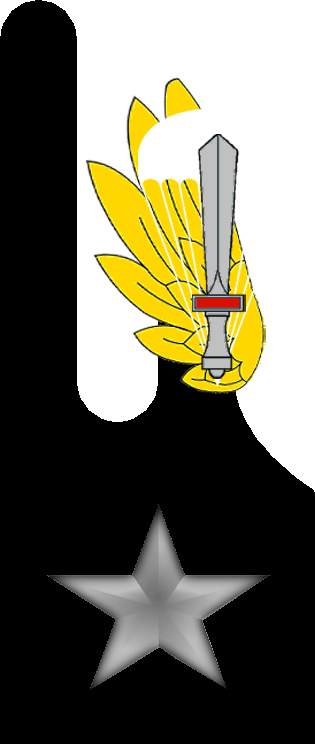
- Regimental gorget patches

The 9th Paratroopers Assault Regiment "Col Moschin" (Italian: 9° Reggimento d'Assalto Paracadutisti "Col Moschin") is a Special Forces unit of the Italian Army based in Livorno in Tuscany. The regiment is part of the Italian Army's infantry arm's Paracadutisti speciality and assigned to the Army Special Forces Command for training, preparation, doctrinal and procedural development, and the materiel acquisition. Operationally the regiment falls under the Italian Armed Forces' Joint Special Forces Operations Command. The regiment is the only military unit which has participated in all out-of-area missions of the Italian Army since World War II. The regiment is also the only Italian Army unit to have been awarded the Military Order of Italy thrice.

During World War I the Royal Italian Army formed assault units manned by Arditi troops to storm enemy trenches in close combat. One of these units was the IX Assault Unit, which distinguished itself during the Second Battle of the Piave River by retaking the summit of Col Moschin, and during the preparations for the Battle of Vittorio Veneto by taking the summit of Col della Beretta. For these actions the IX Assault Unit was awarded a Silver Medal of Military Valor and, together with all other Royal Italian Army infantry units, a Military Order of Italy. After the war the IX Assault Unit was disbanded. In 1942, during World War II, the Royal Italian Army formed the 10th Arditi Regiment, whose personnel operated behind allies lines in North Africa. In September 1943, after the announcement of the Armistice of Cassibile the regiment's I Arditi Battalion, which was based in Sardinia and undertook reconnaissance, intelligence gathering, and sabotage missions in allied held Algeria and Tunisia, joined the Italian Co-belligerent Army. In March 1944, the I Arditi Battalion was renamed IX Assault Unit and one month later, in April 1944, the unit entered the front on the allied side. The IX Assault Unit fought in Italian campaign and was awarded two Silver Medals of Military Valor for its conduct during the campaign. After the war the IX Assault Unit was disbanded.

In 1953, the Italian Army formed a Paratroopers Saboteurs Company, which in 1954 was expanded to Paratroopers Saboteurs Unit. In 1961, the unit was renamed Paratroopers Saboteurs Battalion. In 1963, the battalion was assigned to the Paratroopers Brigade, which in 1967 was renamed Paratroopers Brigade "Folgore". In 1975, the battalion was renamed 9th Paratroopers Assault Battalion "Col Moschin" and assigned the flag and traditions of the 10th Arditi Regiment and the traditions of the IX Assault Unit. In 1995, the battalion lost its autonomy and entered the newly formed 9th Paratroopers Assault Regiment "Col Moschin". In 2014, the regiment was transferred from the Paratroopers Brigade "Folgore" to the newly formed Army Special Forces Command. The regiment's anniversary falls on 16 June 1918, the day the IX Assault Unit retook the Italian positions on the summit of the Col Moschin, which had been lost the day before.

== History ==
=== World War I ===
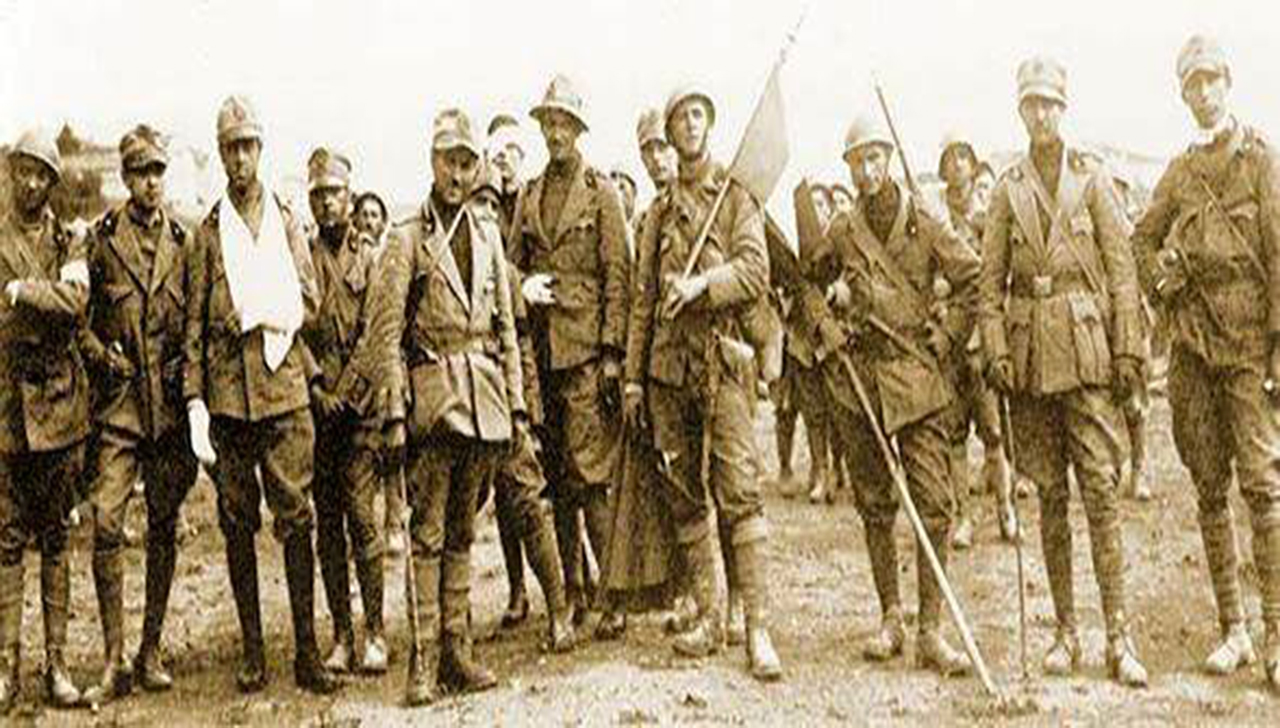
IX Assault Unit troops after the Battle of Col Moschin in June 1918

In November 1916, during World War I, the Royal Italian Army began to experiment with dedicated assault troops modeled after the Imperial German Army's Stormtroopers. In spring 1917, the first assault units were formed with volunteer personnel. On 27 July 1917, King Victor Emmanuel III sanctioned the formation of the Arditi corps and the corps' assault units. Each assault unit fielded 753 Arditi and had the following organization:

- Assault Unit
  - Command Squad (10× Arditi)
  - 3× Assault companies (226× Arditi per company)
    - Command Squad (10× Arditi)
    - 4× Assault platoons (44× Arditi)
      - Assault Squad (12× Arditi with a dagger and 20× hand grenades)
      - Attack Squad (10× Arditi with a dagger, 4× hand grenades, and a Carcano carbine with 72 rounds)
      - 2× Attack squads (8× Arditi with a dagger, 4× hand grenades, and a Carcano carbine with 72 rounds; 2× Arditi with a Villar Perosa submachine guns with 500 rounds)
      - Ammunition Team (2× Arditi carrying 150× hand grenades)
    - Specialists Platoon (40× Arditi)
      - Machine Gunners Section (18× Arditi with 2× Fiat–Revelli Mod. 1914 machine guns with 20,000 rounds per gun)
      - Sappers Section (12× Arditi)
      - Signalers Section (10× Arditi)
  - Support Company
    - Canonniers Section (37× Canonniers with 2× 65/17 infantry support guns)
    - Machine Gunners Section (18× Arditi with 2× Fiat–Revelli Mod. 1914 machine guns with 20,000 rounds per gun)
    - Replacements Squad (10× Arditi)

On 18 and 19 August 1917, three assault units fought in the Eleventh Battle of the Isonzo and successfully cleared trenches manned by Austro-Hungarian Army troops. After the disastrous Battle of Caporetto the Royal Italian Army added a flamethrower section to each assault company. The Arditi also received a standardized uniform, which included black gorget patches and a black Fez with a black tassel. In spring 1917, each Italian army corps received an assault unit, among them the IX Assault Unit (Italian: IX Reparto d'Assalto"), which was formed in May 1918, by the regimental depot of the 45th Infantry Regiment (Brigade "Reggio") in Sassari for the IX Army Corps.

On 15 June 1918, the Austro-Hungarian Army began the Second Battle of the Piave River along the Piave river and on the Monte Grappa massif. In the latter sector the Austro-Hungarian forces managed to occupy part of the Italian first line during the first day of the battle. On 16 June, the IX Assault Unit was ordered to retake the Italian positions on the summit of Col Moschin, which had been lost the day before on. The IX Assault Unit retook the position in a lightning attack and held the summit until Italian infantry could be brought up.

On 20 October 1918, in preparation of the Battle of Vittorio Veneto, the IX Assault Unit attacked and conquered the summit of Col della Beretta in the Monte Grappa sector, but suffered heavy casualties in the attack. For its conduct on 15 June and 20 October 1918 the IX Assault Unit was awarded Italy's second-highest military honor the Silver Medal of Military Valor. By the end of the war 39 assault units had been formed: twelve assigned to the army's two assault divisions, 14 assigned to the Italian field armies, two deployed to the Western Front, one deployed to the Macedonian front, one deployed to the Albanian Front, and nine as replacement units. After the war all Arditi units were disbanded.

=== World War II ===
==== 10th Arditi Regiment ====
On 15 May 1942, the depot of the 82nd Infantry Regiment "Torino" in Bracciano formed the I Arditi Battalion. The battalion consisted of the 101st Paratroopers Company, 102nd Swimmers Company (later renamed: 102nd Landing Company), and 103rd Trucks Company (later renamed: 103rd Terrestrial Company). Each company consisted of ten patrols of two officers and ten men each. Advanced training for the paratroopers occurred at the Royal Italian Air Force's Paratroopers School Tarquinia, while advanced training for the swimmers occurred at the Royal Italian Navy's Divers School in Livorno and at the naval base in Pula. The personnel of the trucks company was trained to take fixed positions or heavily guarded locations. All members of the battalion were also trained in the use of explosives at the Royal Italian Army's Sappers School in Civitavecchia.

On 20 July 1942, the Royal Italian Army's General Staff ordered to form an Arditi Regiment, which would consist of a command, regimental services, and at least two Arditi battalions. The regiment was based in Santa Severa and on 1 August the I Arditi Battalion joined the newly formed regiment. The regiment was under direct control of the General Staff's Operations Office.

On 20 August 1942, the II Arditi Battalion was formed, which consisted of the 111th Paratroopers Company, 112th Swimmers Company (later renamed: 112th Landing Company), and 113th Terrestrial Company. On 15 September 1942, the Arditi Regiment was renamed 10th Arditi Regiment. In January 1943, the I Arditi Battalion with the 101st Paratroopers Company and 102nd Landing Company was transferred to Cagliari in Sardinia, from where the battalion conducted operations behind allied lines in Algeria and Tunisia. Before the battalion left mainland Italy for Sardinia both companies detached two patrols, which were sent to the island of Rhodes and intended to operate against British forces in Cyprus. Between 19 and 23 February 1943, the 103rd Terrestrial Company was transferred to Tunisia, where the company's patrols operated behind enemy lines on reconnaissance and intelligence gathering missions during the Tunisian campaign.

On 1 March 1943, the formation of the III Arditi Battalion concluded. The battalion consisted of the 121st Paratroopers Company, 122nd Landing Company, and 123rd Terrestrial Company. In April 1943, the two patrols of the 101st Paratroopers Company returned from Rhodes without having undertaken any missions. On 4 May 1943, the 113th Terrestrial Company was transferred to Scordia in Sicily, from where it was intended to operate against allied targets in Tunisia. On 13 May 1943, the remaining Axis forces in Tunisia surrendered, including the 103rd Terrestrial Company. One week later, on 20 May 1943, the II Arditi Battalion and the 112th Landing Company were transferred to Sicily, while on 29 May the 123rd Terrestrial Company was transferred to Sardinia and assigned to the I Arditi Battalion as replacement for the lost 103rd Terrestrial Company.

On 10 June 1943, the 10th Arditi Regiment was reorganized and three special companies were formed, which consisted of personnel capable of operating behind enemy lines in civilian clothes. Afterwards the regiment consisted now of the following units:

- 10th Arditi Regiment, in Santa Severa
  - I Arditi Battalion, in Cagliari (Sardinia)
    - 102nd Landing Company, 123rd Terrestrial Company, 110th Special Company
  - II Arditi Battalion, in Scordia (Sicily)
    - 112th Landing Company, 113th Terrestrial Company, 120th Special Company
  - III Arditi Battalion, in Santa Severa
    - 122nd Landing Company, 133rd Terrestrial Company, 130th Special Company
  - IV Arditi Battalion, in Santa Severa
    - 101st Paratroopers Company, 111th Paratroopers Company, and 121st Paratroopers Company
  - Services Platoon

As part of the reorganization the formation of a fifth Arditi battalion began. On 19 June 1943, the remaining personnel returned from Rhodes.

==== Operations ====
The first operation of the regiment occurred during the night of 16 to 17 January 1943, when a patrol of the 101st Paratroopers Company parachuted into Algeria on an intelligence gathering mission. In the night of 16 to 17 February 1943, a patrol of the same company blew up the railway bridge at Béni Mansour on the Béni Mansour–Bejaïa railway. From January to July 1943 the regiment undertook twenty air or sea assaults against railway bridges, airfields, and other objects in Algeria, Tunisia, or Libya.

On 10 July 1943, allied forces landed on Sicily. Initially the II Arditi Battalion was tasked with rounding up dispersed allied paratroopers, but on 14 July the battalion was moved to the Primosole Bridge across the Simeto river to the South of Catania, where in the night of 14–15 July the battalion defeated a British attempt to take the bridge in a surprise attack during Operation Fustian. In the evening of 30 July 1943, the 4th Patrol of the 112th Landing Company embarked at Giardini Naxos on three assault boats of the Royal Italian Navy. The ten Arditi landed behind allied lines at Brucoli from where the patrol hiked inland. After hiding during the day the patrol attacked an allied fuel and ammunition depot after nightfall. Afterwards the patrol moved on foot to the front line along the Simeto river and reached the Italian lines by swimming around the English positions at the mouth of the Simeto river. On 13 August 1943, the II Aridit Battalion was evacuated across the Strait of Messina and returned to Santa Severa.

In the evening of 8 September 1943, the Armistice of Cassibile, which ended hostilities between the Kingdom of Italy and the Anglo-American Allies, was announced by General Dwight D. Eisenhower on Radio Algiers and by Marshal Pietro Badoglio on Italian radio. Germany reacted by invading Italy and the 10th Arditi Regiment split: the 111th Paratroopers Company and 122nd Landing Company fought against the invading Germans, which tried to occupy Rome, while the rest of the regiment remained in its barracks. After occupying Rome the Germans disbanded the regiment and most of its companies, while the 112th Landing Company and 121st Paratroopers Company joined the Benito Mussolini's National Republican Army.

==== IX Assault Unit ====
After the announcement of the Armistice of Cassibile, the I Arditi Battalion in Sardinia refused German demands to surrender and, on 12 September 1943, the battalion defeated a German attempt to disarm it. Soon afterwards the German forces retreated from Sardinia. The I Arditi Battalion remained on the island until February 1944, when it was shipped to Naples, where it arrived on 19 February. On 20 March 1944, the I Arditi Battalion was renamed IX Assault Unit and assigned to the Italian Co-belligerent Army's I Motorized Grouping. The I Motorized Grouping fought on the allied side in the Italian campaign. On 18 April 1944, the I Motorized Grouping entered the Italian Liberation Corps, which was assigned to the II Polish Corps for the Battle of Ancona. On 27 June 1944, the IX Assault Unit was reinforced by the 1st Reconnaissance Squadron "Cavalleggeri Guide". By 25 July 1944, the IX Assault Unit had fought at Colli a Volturno, Guardiagrele, Cingoli, and along the Musone and Esino rivers, and in the Battle of Ancona, where the unit achieved the decisive breakthrough of the German line at Casenuove. For its conduct in these battles the IX Assault Unit was awarded a second Silver Medal of Military Valor.

On 24 September 1944, the IX Assault Unit entered the 68th Infantry Regiment "Legnano" as III Battalion "Col Moschin". The battalion was equipped with British weapons and materiel and consisted of approximately 400 men divided into a command company, three assault companies, and a support weapons company. The 68th Infantry Regiment "Legnano" was assigned to the Combat Group "Legnano", which entered the front on 23 March 1945 as part of the IV US Corps on the river Idice. The Combat Group "Legnano" fought in the allied Spring Offensive and took part in the Battle of Bologna. For its conduct in these battles the III Battalion "Col Moschin" was awarded the unit's third Silver Medal of Military Valor.

On 1 August 1946, the III Battalion "Col Moschin" was disbanded and its personnel used to form the III Fusiliers Battalion of the 68th Infantry Regiment "Legnano".

=== Cold War ===
On 20 April 1953, the Italian Army's Infantry School in Cesano formed a Paratroopers Saboteurs Company. On 1 June 1954, the company was expanded to Paratroopers Saboteurs Unit. On 10 May 1957, the unit moved from Cesano to Pisa, where it was assigned to the army's Military Parachuting Center. On 25 September 1961, the unit was renamed Paratroopers Saboteurs Battalion. On 1 January 1963, the Military Parachuting Center was reorganized as Paratroopers Brigade, which, on 10 June 1967, was renamed Paratroopers Brigade "Folgore".

During the 1975 army reform the Italian Army disbanded the regimental level and newly independent battalions were granted for the first time their own flags. On 1 October 1975, the Paratroopers Saboteurs Battalion was renamed 9th Paratroopers Assault Battalion "Col Moschin". The battalion was assigned to the Paratroopers Brigade "Folgore" and consisted of the following units:

- 9th Paratroopers Assault Battalion "Col Moschin", in Pisa
  - Command and Services Company
    - Command and Services Platoon
    - Amphibious Platoon
    - Transport Platoon
  - Assault Company (Recruits Training)
    - Command and Services Platoon
    - 2× Recruits platoons
  - 2× Assault companies
    - 6× Operational detachments per company

At the time the battalion fielded 340 men (36 officers, 196 non-commissioned officers, and 108 soldiers). On 12 November 1976, the President of the Italian Republic Giovanni Leone assigned with decree 846 the flag and traditions of the 10th Arditi Regiment and the traditions of the IX Assault Unit to the battalion. The three Silver Medals of Military Valor, which had been awarded to the IX Assault Unit in World War I respectively in World War II, were affixed to the battalion's flag and added to its coat of arms.

From September 1982 to November 1983, personnel of the battalion formed, together with personnel drawn from the 1st Carabinieri Paratroopers Battalion "Tuscania" and 2nd Paratroopers Battalion "Tarquinia", a provisional battalion, which deployed with the Italian contingent to Lebanon in support of the Multinational Force in Lebanon.

=== Recent times ===
From May to October 1991, the battalion's 2nd and 3rd companies and two companies of the 5th Paratroopers Battalion "El Alamein" formed a paratroopers tactical group, which deployed to northern Iraq for the American-led Operation Provide Comfort. From 22 December 1992 to 7 September 1993, personnel of the battalion was deployed to Somalia for the American-led Unified Task Force. For the conduct of its personnel in Somalia the battalion was awarded a Gold Medal of Army Valor, which was affixed to the battalion's flag and added to its coat of arms.

On 25 October 1994, the battalion was awarded a Military Order of Italy for the many missions it had undertaken since being reformed. The order was affixed to the battalion's flag. On 24 June 1995, the 9th Paratroopers Assault Battalion "Col Moschin" lost its autonomy and the next day the battalion entered the newly formed 9th Paratroopers Assault Regiment "Col Moschin" as 1st Raiders Battalion. On the same day, the flag and traditions of the 10th Arditi Regiment and the traditions of the IX Assault Unit were transferred from the battalion to the regiment. The regiment consisted of a command, a command and services company, the 1st Raiders Battalion, the 101st Paratroopers Assault Company, and the Raiders Training Base.

From 3 July 1996 to 24 March 1997, personnel of the regiment was deployed to Bosnia and Herzegovina for the NATO-led Implementation Force and the following Stabilisation Force in Bosnia and Herzegovina. For the conduct of its personnel in Bosnia and Herzegovina the regiment was awarded a Silver Medal of Army Valor, which was affixed to the regiment's flag and added to its coat of arms.

From July 2006 to October 2009, the regiment maintained a permanent presence in Kabul in Afghanistan as part of the NATO-led International Security Assistance Force. During its time in Afghanistan the regiment's personnel repeatedly battled Taliban forces. For its conduct in Afghanistan the regiment was awarded its third Military Order of Italy, which was affixed to the regiment's flag.

On 19 September 2014, the regiment was transferred from the Paratroopers Brigade "Folgore" to the newly formed Army Special Forces Command. In 2022, the regiment moved from Pisa to its new base at Camp Darby near Livorno.

== Organization ==
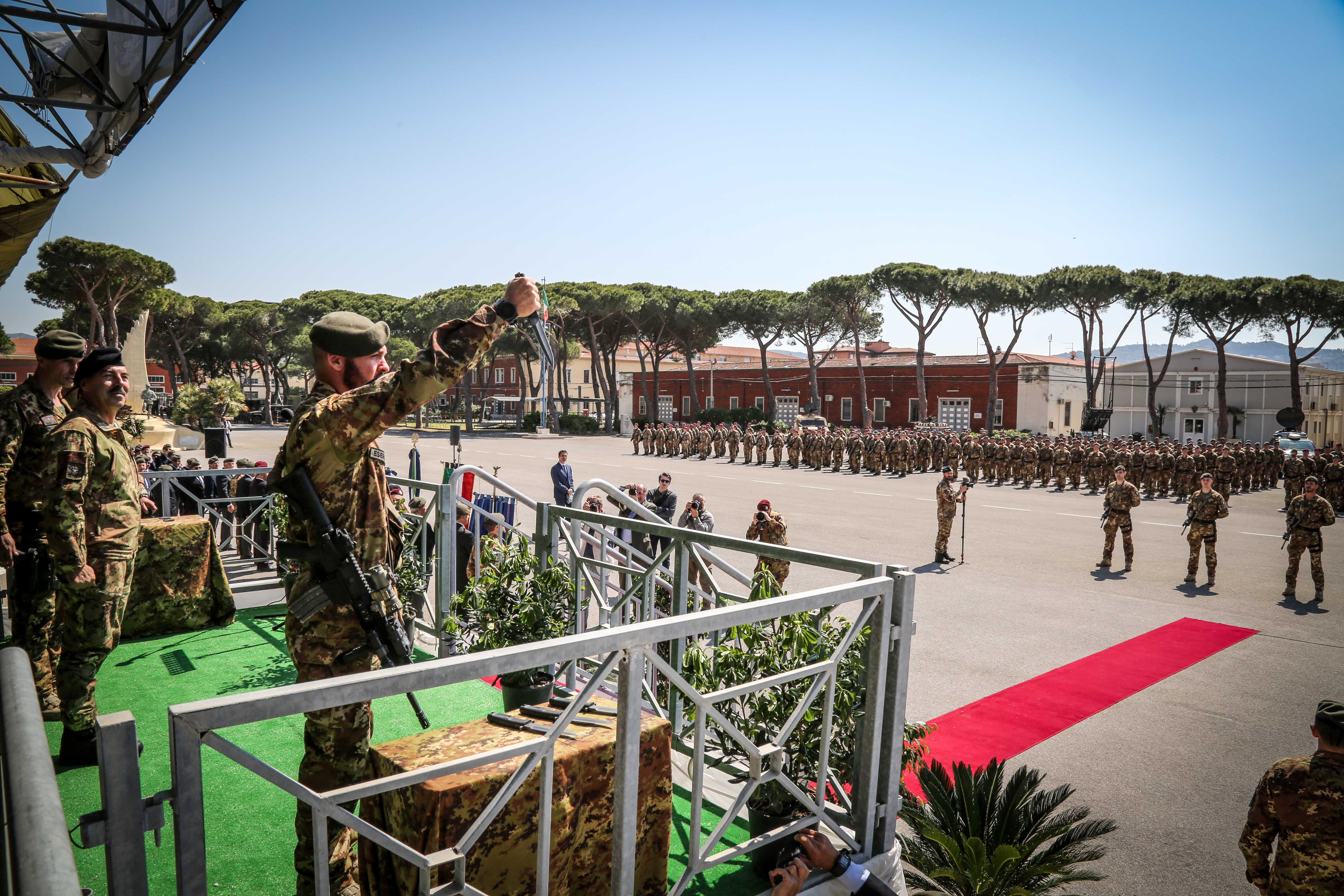
New members of the 9th Paratroopers Assault Regiment "Col Moschin" receive their dagger in front of the assembled regiment

As of November 2024 the 9th Paratroopers Assault Regiment "Col Moschin" is organized as follows:

- 9th Paratroopers Assault Regiment "Col Moschin", at Camp Darby
  - 1st Raiders Battalion
    - 110th Raiders Company
    - 120th Raiders Company
    - 130th Raiders Company
    - 140th Raiders Company
  - Operational Support Battalion
    - Command and Logistic Support Company
    - C4 Company
  - Raiders Training Unit
    - Raiders Training Base
    - 101st Recruits Company (Basic Training)
    - 102nd Recruits Company (Advanced Training)
  - Staff and Personnel Office
  - Operations, Training and Information Office
  - Logistic and Administrative Office

== See also ==
- Italian Special Forces
  - Italian Army: 4th Alpini Paratroopers Regiment
  - Italian Army: 185th Paratroopers Reconnaissance Target Acquisition Regiment "Folgore"
