= 58th Infantry Division "Legnano" =

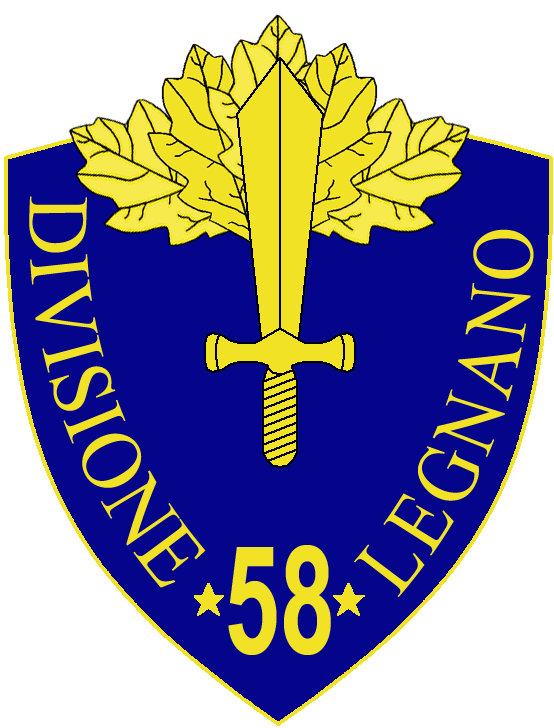
- 58th Infantry Division "Legnano" insignia
- Active: 1939–1944
- Country: Kingdom of Italy
- Branch: Royal Italian Army
- Type: Infantry
- Size: Division
- Garrison/HQ: Legnano
- Engagements: World War II

Insignia
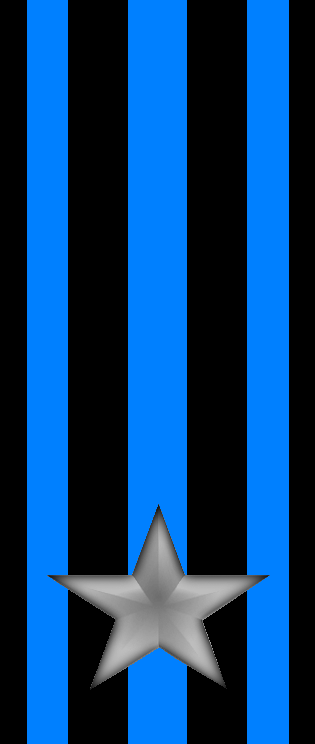
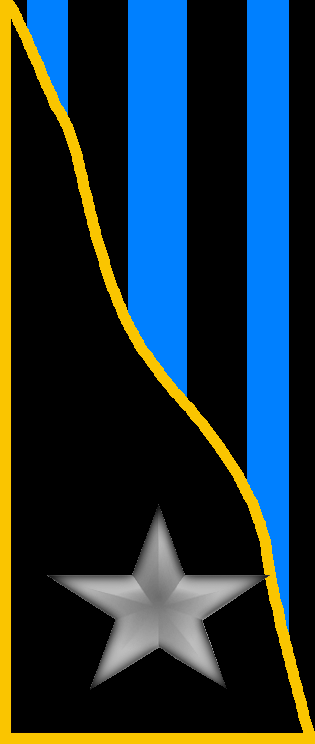
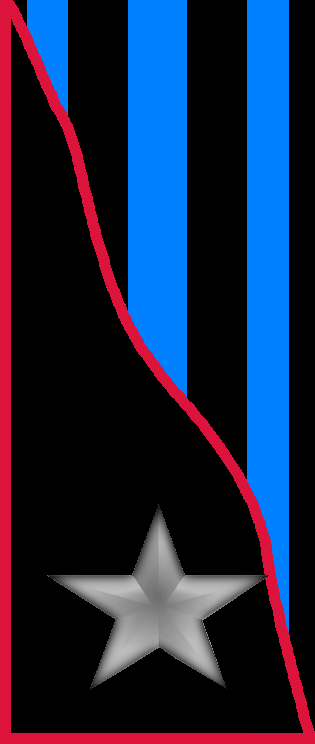
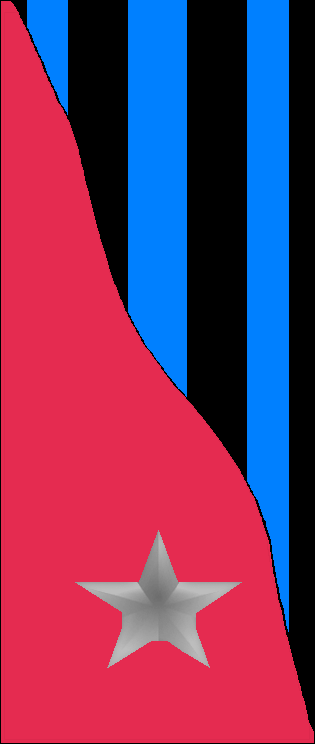
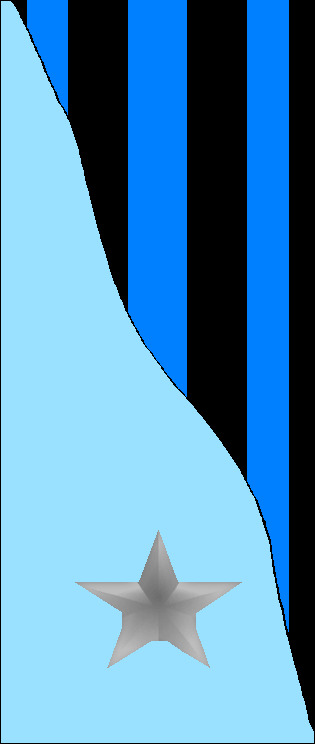
- Identification symbol: Legnano Division gorget patches

The 58th Infantry Division "Legnano" (Italian: 58ª Divisione di fanteria "Legnano") was an infantry division of the Royal Italian Army during World War II. The Legnano's predecessor division was formed on 8 February 1934 in Milan and named for the medieval Battle of Legnano. On 24 May 1939 the division split to form the 6th Infantry Division "Cuneo" and the 58th Infantry Division "Legnano". After the announcement of the Armistice of Cassibile the Legnano resisted the invading German forces. The division's staff and 67th Infantry Regiment "Legnano" were used to form the first unit of the Italian Co-belligerent Army, which fought on the allied side in the Italian campaign. On 17 February 1944 the division's last units joined other commands and the division was officially dissolved.

== History ==
The division's lineage begins with the Brigade "Palermo" established in Turin on 1 August 1862 with the 67th and 68th infantry regiments.

=== World War I ===
The brigade fought on the Italian front in World War I. On 1 November 1926 the brigade command was disbanded and the brigade's two regiments were transferred to other brigades: the 67th Infantry Regiment "Palermo" to the VI Infantry Brigade and the 68th Infantry Regiment "Palermo" to the II Infantry Brigade.

The VI Infantry Brigade also included the 7th Infantry Regiment "Cuneo" and 8th Infantry Regiment "Cuneo". The brigade was the infantry component of the 6th Territorial Division of Milan, which also included the 27th Field Artillery Regiment. In 1934 the division changed its name to 6th Infantry Division "Legnano". On 24 May 1939 the 6th Infantry Division "Legnano" was renamed 6th Infantry Division "Cuneo" and transferred the "Legnano" name together with the 67th Infantry Regiment "Palermo" to the newly activated 58th Infantry Division "Legnano". On the same date the Legnano division received the 68th Infantry Regiment "Palermo" from the 2nd Infantry Division "Sforzesca" and the newly raised 58th Artillery Regiment. All three regiments of the Legnano division were then renamed "Legano".

=== World War II ===
==== Invasion of France ====
In June 1940 during the Italian invasion of France the division remained in the Fenestrelle-Col de Fenestre area as reserve of the 4th Army. On 21-24 June 1940 the division entered the front in the Colle del Monginevro area. After the Franco-Italian Armistice was signed on 24 June 1940 the Legnano moved to Briançon for occupation duty.

==== Greco-Italian War ====
In early January 1941 the Legnano was transferred to Albania to reinforce the Italian front in the Greco-Italian War. On 7 January 1941 the Legnano entered the front in the sector along the coast. On 25 January the division was sent to the Golikut sector, where the next day the division participated in the Italian attack with the aim to recapture Këlcyrë pass in the Battle of Trebeshina. On 8 March 1941 the division went on the defensive and did not participate in the initial stage of the Italian Spring Offensive. After Greek units withdrew from the Albanian front during the Battle of Greece, the Legnano advanced and reached Këlcyrë on 16 April 1941. The division then advanced to Kuman before being reassigned as reserve of the 9th Army. On 21 June the Legnano began boarding ships in Vlorë for the return to Lombardy. The division was then sent to Liguria for coastal defense duties.

==== Occupation of Vichy France ====
In November 1942 the division participated in the Occupation of Vichy France and was then deployed for coastal defence duty in the Cannes-Saint-Tropez sector of the Italian occupation zone.

==== Operation Achse ====
In August 1943 the division was ordered to move to Apulia in the south east of Italy. The division's units were moved by rail through Bologna and then to Brindisi. After the Armistice of Cassibile was announced on 8 September 1943, some units were already at Brindisi and Francavilla Fontana, while others were stranded in Bologna or in locations on the way to their destination. Together with the 152nd Infantry Division "Piceno", the 210th Coastal Division, and the XXXI Coastal Brigade the units of the Legnano in Apulia deployed to form a defensive line from Taranto through Grottaglie, Francavilla Fontana, and Latiano to Brindisi, to screen the landing of the British 1st Airborne Division at Taranto on 9 September from attacks of the German 1st Fallschirmjäger Division.

==== Italian Co-belligerent Army ====
On 26 September 1943 the division's command was used to raise the I Motorized Grouping, which was to aid the Allied war effort. In the following months, the division's units were transferred to other commands fighting in the Italian campaign. On 17 February 1944 the division's last units joined other commands and the division was officially dissolved. On 24 September 1944 the II Brigade of the Italian Liberation Corps was renamed as Combat Group "Legnano". The Combat Group consisted of the 68th Infantry Regiment "Legnano", the 11th Motorized Artillery Regiment, the IX Assault Battalion and the Special Infantry Regiment, which contained the remnants of the 3rd Alpini Regiment and 4th Bersaglieri Regiment. The Combat Group was equipped with British weapons and materiel. The new Legnano went to the front as part of the II Polish Corps, on the extreme left of the British 8th Army near the river Idice, and was tasked with liberating Bologna.

== Organization ==
=== 58th Infantry Division "Legnano" ===
58th Infantry Division "Legnano" organization in 1940

- 58th Infantry Division "Legnano", in Legnano
  - Headquarters
    - Command Company
    - 18th Carabinieri Section
    - 39th Carabinieri Section
    - 16th Field Post Office
    - 58th Infantry Division Command Transport Squad
  - 67th Infantry Regiment "Legnano" (Note: Named 67th Infantry Regiment "Palermo" until 1939 when the army reorganized its divisions as binary divisions and divisional infantry regiments took the name of the division.), in Como
    - Command Company
    - 3 × Fusilier battalions
    - Support Weapons Battery (65/17 mod. 13 infantry support guns)
    - Mortar Company (81mm mod. 35 mortars)
  - 68th Infantry Regiment "Legnano" (Note: Named 68th Infantry Regiment "Palermo" until 1939 when the army reorganized its divisions as binary divisions and divisional infantry regiments took the name of the division.), in Legnano
    - Command Company
    - 3 × Fusilier battalions
    - Support Weapons Battery (65/17 mod. 13 infantry support guns)
    - Mortar Company (81mm mod. 35 mortars)
  - 58th Artillery Regiment "Legnano", in Milan
    - Command Unit
    - I Group (100/17 mod. 14 howitzers; transferred from the 1st Artillery Regiment "Cacciatori delle Alpi")
    - II Group (75/27 mod. 11 field guns; transferred from the 27th Artillery Regiment "Cuneo"; transferred on 25 December 1940 to the 7th Artillery Regiment "Cremona")
    - II Group (75/18 mod. 35 howitzers; transferred on 25 December 1940 from the 7th Artillery Regiment "Cremona")
    - III Group (75/27 mod. 11 field guns; transferred from the 30th Artillery Regiment "Lupi di Toscana"; re-equipped with 75/18 mod. 35 howitzers in December 1940)
    - IV Group (100/17 mod. 14 howitzers; transferred on 14 January 1942 from the 6th Artillery Regiment "Isonzo")
    - 358th Anti-aircraft Battery (20/65 mod. 35 anti-aircraft guns)
    - Ammunition and Supply Unit
  - LVIII Mortar Battalion (81mm mod. 35 mortars)
  - CCVII Replacements Battalion (joined the division in Albania)
  - CCVIII Replacements Battalion (joined the division in Albania)
  - 58th Anti-tank Company (47/32 mod. 35 anti-tank guns)
  - 25th Engineer Company
  - 58th Telegraph and Radio Operators Company
  - 61st Medical Section
    - 3 × Field hospitals
    - 1 × Surgical unit
  - 30th Supply Section
  - 58th Autocarrette Section
  - 138th Transport Section

Attached to the division from June to December 1940:

- VII CC.NN. Battalion

Attached to the division from December 1940 until early 1942:

- 26th CC.NN. Legion "Giussano"
  - VII CC.NN. Battalion
  - LIII CC.NN. Battalion
  - 26th CC.NN. Machine Gun Company

Attached to the division in France in August 1943:

- VII CC.NN. Battalion "Milano"
- LXVIII CC.NN. Battalion "Toscano"

Attached to the division in Southern Italy on 8 September 1943:

- 162nd Coastal Regiment
- 4th Coastal Artillery Grouping
- XCIX Guardia alla Frontiera Artillery Grouping
- CCCL Coastal Battalion

=== 1st Motorized Grouping ===
- 1st Motorized Grouping (58th Infantry Division "Legnano" Staff)
  - Command Company
  - 67th Motorized Infantry Regiment "Legnano"
    - Command Company
    - I Battalion/67th Infantry Regiment
    - I Battalion/93rd Infantry Regiment (troops from the 18th Infantry Division "Messina")
    - LI Bersaglieri Battalion
    - 281st Anti-tank Rifles Company (S-18/1000 anti-tank rifles)
  - V Anti-tank Battalion (newly formed)
    - 16th Anti-tank Company (47/32 mod. 35 anti-tank guns)
    - 56th Anti-tank Company (47/32 mod. 35 anti-tank guns)
    - Tank Company (L6/40 tanks)
  - 11th Motorized Artillery Regiment (from the 104th Infantry Division "Mantova")
    - Command Unit
    - III Group (75/18 mod. 35 howitzers)
    - IV Group (75/18 mod. 35 howitzers)
    - XII Group (105/28 cannons; from the 5th Army Corps Artillery Regiment)
    - CCCXIV Group (100/22 mod. 14/19 howitzers)
    - 1 × Anti-aircraft Battery (20/65 mod. 35 anti-aircraft guns)
    - Ammunition and Supply Unit
  - LI Mixed Engineer Battalion
  - Carabinieri Section
  - Medical Unit
  - Supply Unit
  - Field Post Office

== Military honors ==
For its conduct during the Allied campaign to liberate Italy the President of Italy awarded on 12 December 1948 to the 67th Infantry Regiment "Legnano" Italy's highest military honor, the Gold Medal of Military Valor.

- 67th Infantry Regiment "Legnano" on 12 December 1948

== Commanding officers ==
The division's commanding officers were:

- Generale di Divisione Edoardo Scala (24 May 1939 - 31 December 1940)
- Colonel Davide Borghini (acting, 1-4 January 1941)
- Generale di Brigata Vittorio Ruggero (5-24 January 1941)
- Generale di Divisione Amedeo De Cia (25 January 1941 - 21 November 1942)
- Generale di Divisione Giovanni Marciani (22 November 1942 - 28 December 1942)
- Generale di Divisione Roberto Olmi (29 December 1942 - 9 September 1943)
- Generale di Brigata Vincenzo Dapino (10 September 1943 - 27 September 1943)
- Generale di Brigata Silvio Brisotto (1943 - 1944)
- Generale di Brigata Livio Negro (1944 - 17 February 1944)

== Bibliography ==
- Paoletti, Ciro (2008). A Military History of Italy. Greenwood Publishing Group. ISBN 978-0-275-98505-9.
- Jowett, Phillip (25 May 2001). The Italian Army 1940–45 (3): Italy 1943–45. Osprey Publishing, Westminster. ISBN 978-1-85532-866-2.
- Mollo, Andrew (1981). The Armed Forces of World War II. Crown Publishing, New York. ISBN 0-517-54478-4.
