= Presezzo =

- Comune
- Comune di Presezzo
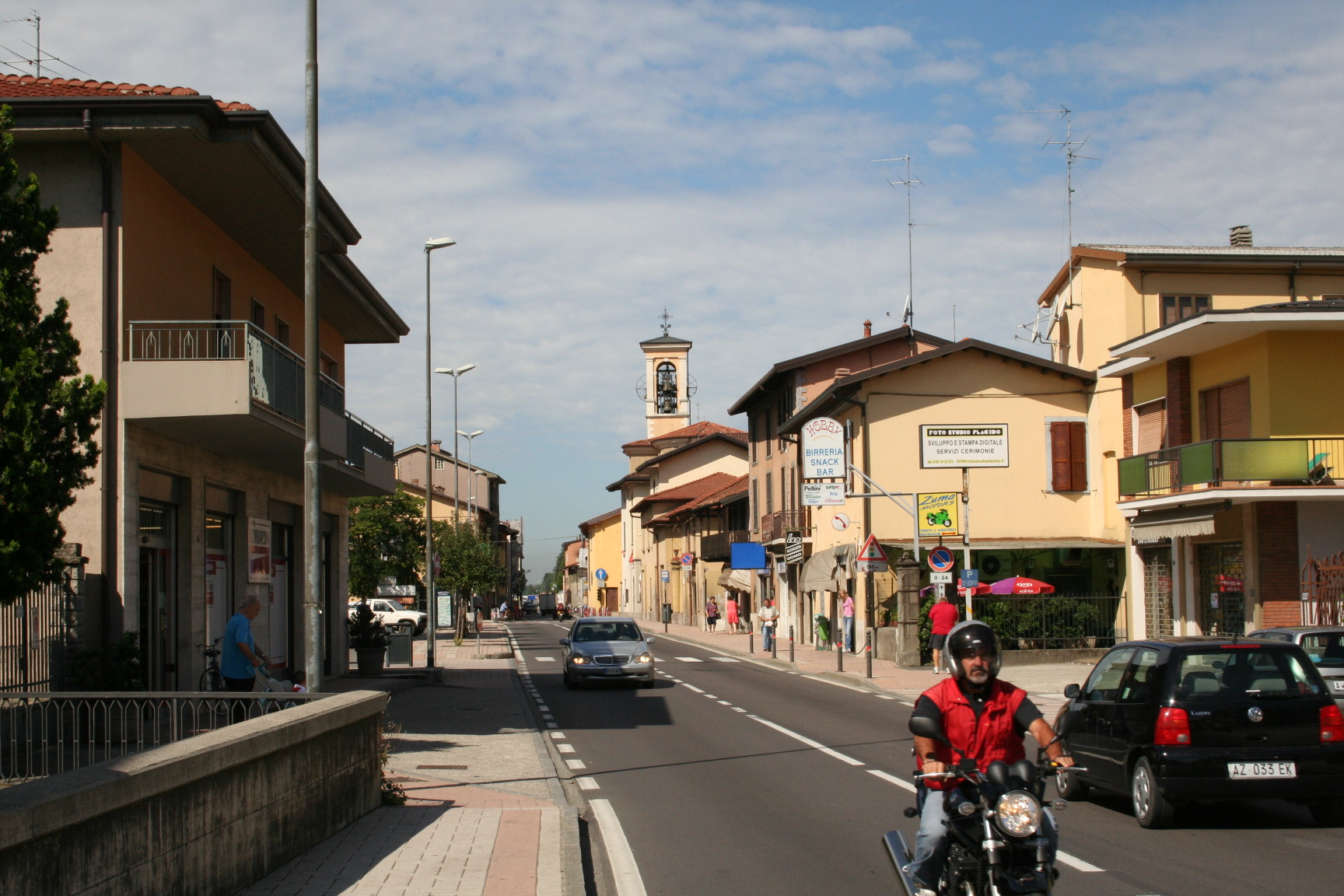
- Centre of the town

- Location within Italy Location within Lombardy
- Coordinates: 45°42′N 9°34′E
- Country: Italy
- Region: Lombardy
- Province: Province of Bergamo (BG)
- Frazioni: Ghiaie di Presezzo

Area
  - Total: 2.13 km^{2} (0.82 sq mi)
- Elevation: 236 m (774 ft)

Population (Dec. 2004)
  - Total: 4,657
  - Density: 2,190/km^{2} (5,660/sq mi)
- Demonym(s): Presezzesi (less common Presezzini)
- Time zone: UTC+1 (CET)
  - Summer (DST): UTC+2 (CEST)
- Postal code: 24030
- Dialing code: 035
- Patron saint: Fermo, Rustico
- Saint day: August 9
- Website: Official website

Presezzo (Bergamasque: Presèz or Presèss) is a comune (municipality) in the Province of Bergamo in the Italian region of Lombardy, located about 40 kilometres (25 mi) northeast of Milan and about 8 kilometres (5 mi) west of Bergamo. As of 31 December 2004, it had a population of 4,657 and an area of 2.1 square kilometres (0.81 mi^{2}).

The municipality borders with Mapello on the north, Bonate Sopra to its south-west, and Ponte San Pietro on the east.

== Geography ==
The surface of Presezzo comune covers a mostly flat area of 213 hectares (530 acres) in the central-western sector of the province of Bergamo, in the so-called Isola Brembana. The core of the town is located at an elevation of 236 metres (774 ft), on the two sides of the modest Lesina torrent; the eastern part of the territory, known as Ghiaie di Presezzo, lies 20 metres (66 ft) below the main part of the town, the ground lowering toward the banks of Brembo River. The Lesina torrent crosses the town from north to south 5 kilometres (3 mi) before flowing into the Brembo River. Its flow is narrow all over the year, primarily because waters are diverted upstream to feed industrial facilities and civil usage, and the general global warming concurred in a growing decrease of the average flow of the torrent in last years. Nevertheless, the torrent capacity can quickly grow after copious rainfalls, specifically after late-summer cloudbursts. The unexpected spates of the Lesina caused several floodings in the past decades, resulting in damages to private and public properties; the municipal administration had thereafter renovated the embankments in the early 2000s, thus avoiding further floodings. The actual geomorphology of the area is chiefly due to the perpetual deposit of debris and material by the Brembo River and its tributaries descending from the Prealps located few kilometers to the north. The soil is thus of alluvial origin, mostly made up of gravel and grit in the proximity of Brembo River, clayey in the southerner part of the territory beyond Lesina torrent, rich in humus in the remaining territory. The terrain is suitable for an agricultural exploitation, and for centuries provided subsistence to Presezzo inhabitants; nowadays, only a few part of the territory is still cultivated, most of the land being destined for urbanization.

== History ==
In the religious field, the parish church of San Fermo and Rustico is very important. Built in 1875 in place of a previous cult building, it presents numerous works dedicated to the two patron saints taken from the previous parish church. The church has an organ modified by the Serassi brothers around 1801. The organ was completely restored in 1984. [7]. The churchyard has recently been re-structured, paved and adorned with two olive trees

Other important buildings are the Palazzo Furietti-Carrara, which overlooks the main street and is of seventeenth-century construction, restored between 1997 and 1999. The building contained a cycle of valuable frescoes by Gian Paolo Cavagna that, despite being under the protection of the ministry competent, they were torn between 1939 and 1942 by the last owners of the building and still missing. Only black and white photographs remain of the frescoes. [8]

Of medieval origin are the remains of the castle of Capersegno still surrounded by coeval houses, used by settlers.

In Presezzo there is also a disused military barracks, named after the military gold medalist Riccardo Moioli, an Italian soldier who died in Greece in 1944, during the Second World War. Moioli, despite being hit for the first time by an enemy projectile, continued in the battle until he was hit by a second blow, this fatal one, which killed him. His last words were "Viva l'Italia" and for this reason he was given this important recognition.

The passage of the barracks from the State to the Municipality was completed on November 25, 2006, when the Deputy Minister of Economy signed the decree authorizing the Agenzia del Demanio to transfer the structure to the Municipality. Of the approximately 32,000 m^{2} of the construction will be sold to the municipality and the remaining 10,000 m^{2} will be sold to individuals. This concludes a process that began in 1993. The project for the redevelopment of the area is at its final stages.

== Demography and population ==
Historical population

| Year | Pop. | ±% |
|---|---|---|
| 1861 | 797 | — |
| 1871 | 815 | +2.3% |
| 1881 | 945 | +16.0% |
| 1901 | 1,041 | +10.2% |
| 1911 | 1,207 | +15.9% |

| Year | Pop. | ±% |
|---|---|---|
| 1921 | 1,319 | +9.3% |
| 1931 | 1,514 | +14.8% |
| 1936 | 1,524 | +0.7% |
| 1951 | 1,980 | +29.9% |
| 1961 | 2,285 | +15.4% |

| Year | Pop. | ±% |
|---|---|---|
| 1971 | 2,526 | +10.5% |
| 1981 | 3,444 | +36.3% |
| 1991 | 4,107 | +19.3% |
| 2001 | 4,529 | +10.3% |

Source: Data from ISTAT
