= 210th Coastal Division =

- Active: 1943 – 1945
- Country: Kingdom of Italy
- Branch: Royal Italian Army
- Size: Division
- Garrison/HQ: Monteroni
- Engagements: World War II

Insignia
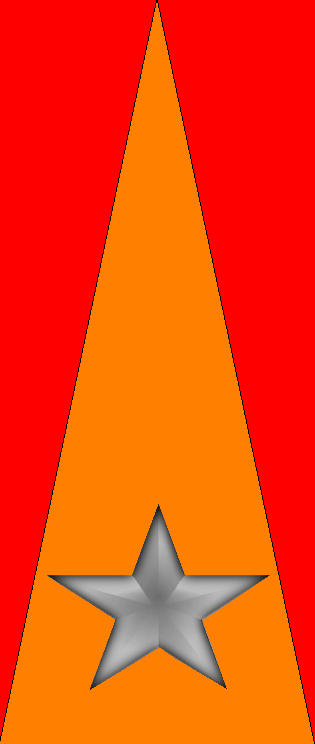
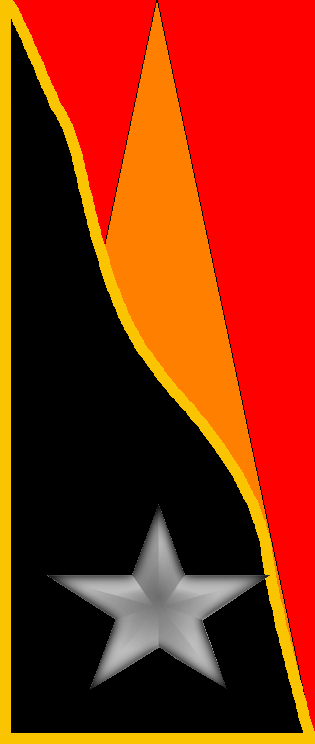
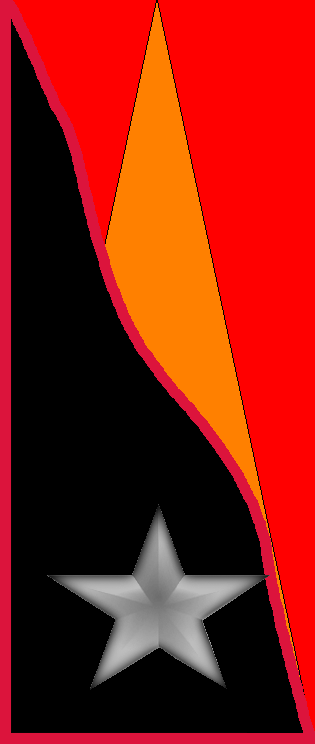
- Identification symbol: 210th Coastal Division gorget patches

The 210th Coastal Division (Italian: 210ª Divisione Costiera) was an infantry division of the Royal Italian Army during World War II. Royal Italian Army coastal divisions were second line divisions formed with reservists and equipped with second rate materiel. They were often commanded by officers called out of retirement.

== History ==
The division was activated on 1 March 1943 in Bari by expanding the X Coastal Brigade. The division was assigned to IX Army Corps and had its headquarter in Monteroni. The division was responsible for the coastal defense of the coast of the Salento peninsula to the south of the towns of Taranto and Brindisi. The defense of the two towns and their surrounding area was the responsibility of the Royal Italian Navy's Maritime Military Base Taranto respectively Maritime Military Base Brindisi.

After the Armistice of Cassibile was announced on 8 September 1943 the division together with the 58th Infantry Division "Legnano", 152nd Infantry Division "Piceno" and XXXI Coastal Brigade immediately established a defensive line beginning in Taranto and running through Grottaglie, Francavilla Fontana, and Latiano to Brindisi, behind which on 9 September the British 1st Airborne Division landed. The division surrendered on 10 September to the British 1st Airborne Division and on 13 September the Allies reactivated the division, which joined the Italian Co-belligerent Army. For the rest of the Italian campaign the division performed rear area security and work duties as 210th Auxiliary Division for the American Fifth Army. The division was disbanded in autumn 1945.

== Organization ==
- 210th Coastal Division, in Monteroni
  - 113th Coastal Regiment
    - 4 × Coastal battalions
  - 114th Coastal Regiment
    - 3 × Coastal battalions
  - 164th Coastal Regiment
    - 3 × Coastal battalions
  - XIV Dismounted Squadrons Group "Cavalleggeri Guide"
  - VII Coastal Artillery Training Group
  - LIV Coastal Artillery Group
  - CCLVI Coastal Artillery Group
  - 3rd Company, CLII Static Machine Gun Battalion
  - 4th Machine Gun Company
  - 18th Anti-tank Company (47/32 mod. 35 anti-tank guns; transferred from the 18th Infantry Division "Messina")
  - 408th Mortar Company (81mm mod. 35 mortars)
  - 34th Telephone Operators Company
  - 210th Telegraph and Radio Operators Company
  - 210th Mixed Engineer Company
  - 241st Anti-paratroopers Unit
  - 243rd Anti-paratroopers Unit
  - 210th Carabinieri Section
  - 179th Field Post Office
  - Division Services

Attached to the division:

- 16th Guardia alla Frontiera Artillery Regiment
  - 3 × Artillery groups

== Commanding officers ==
The division's commanding officers were:

- Generale di Brigata Raffaele Colonna (1 March 1943 - ?)
