= Bersaglieri =

Special troop of marksmen in the Italian Army

A Bersagliere in 1900

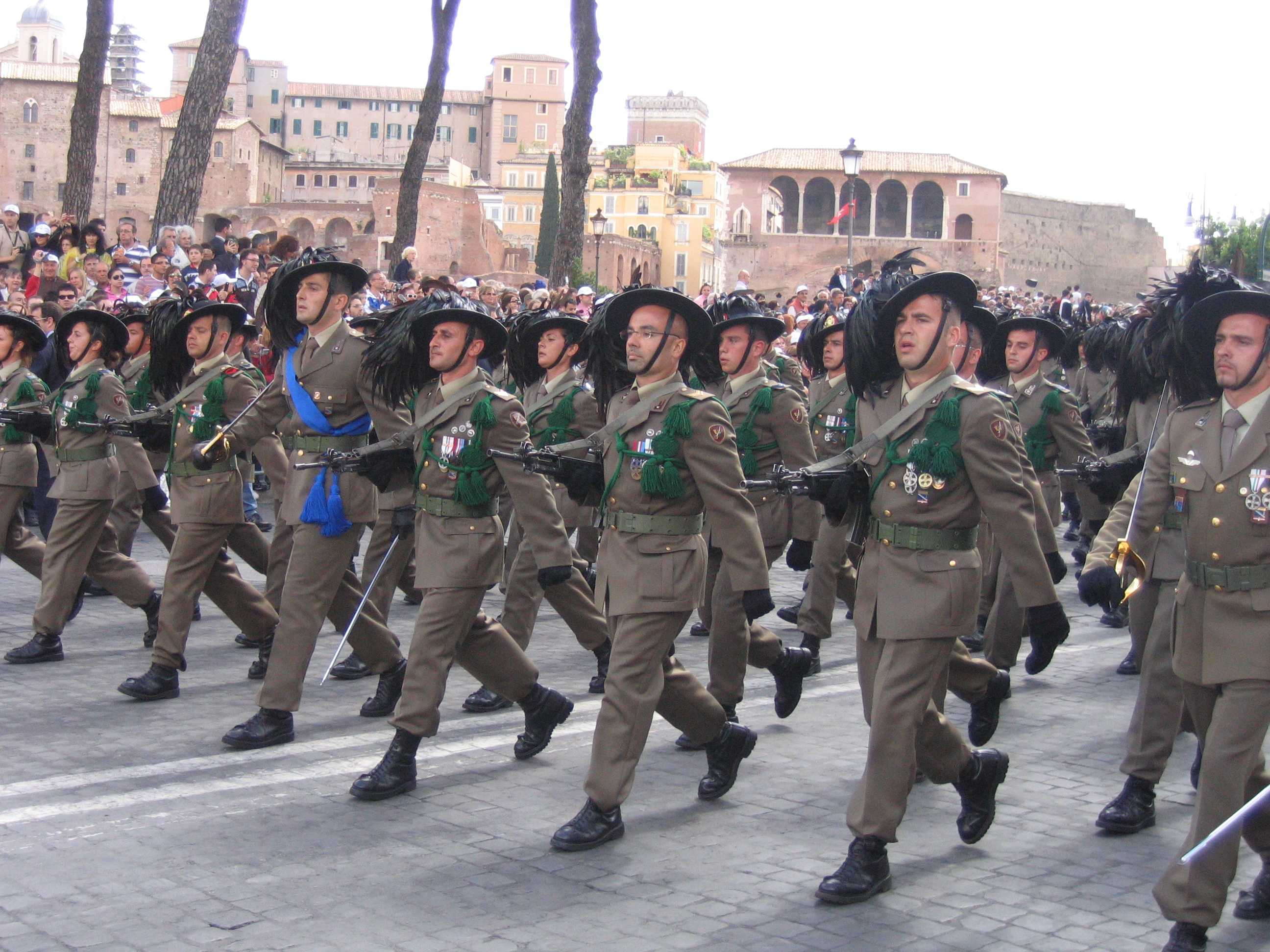
8th Bersaglieri Regiment in 2007

Bersaglieri helmet, WWII

The Bersaglieri, singular Bersagliere (Italian pronunciation: [bersaʎˈʎɛːri], "sharpshooter"), are a troop of marksmen in the Italian Army's infantry corps. They were originally created by General Alessandro Ferrero La Marmora on 18 June 1836 to serve in the Royal Sardinian Army, which later became the Royal Italian Army. They can be recognized by their distinctive wide-brimmed hat decorated with black western capercaillie feathers, which is worn with the dress uniform. The feathers are also applied to their combat helmets.

== Description ==
The Bersaglieri Corps were a high-mobility light infantry at their inception in 1836, with their specific situation evolving with changes in warfare. In the nineteenth century, Bersaglieri acted as skirmishers or shock troops, moving from place to place by running. An elaborate system of bugle calls allowed their units to be deployed and commanded quickly, singly or in combination. The tradition of running continues today in parades and during barracks duty. In World War I, some Bersaglieri served as bicycle troops, better to execute their mission of maneuver warfare. During the Cold War, the Bersaglieri were exclusively employed as mechanized infantry.

Bersaglieri performed in parades and military tattoos, always running instead of marching, with hundreds of black capercaillie feathers flowing from their wide-brimmed black hats. These feathers are also worn on Bersaglieri combat helmets. They once served a military purpose, acting as camouflage and as a sunshade for the marksman's shooting eye. Today, they are a badge of honour.

== Origins and history ==
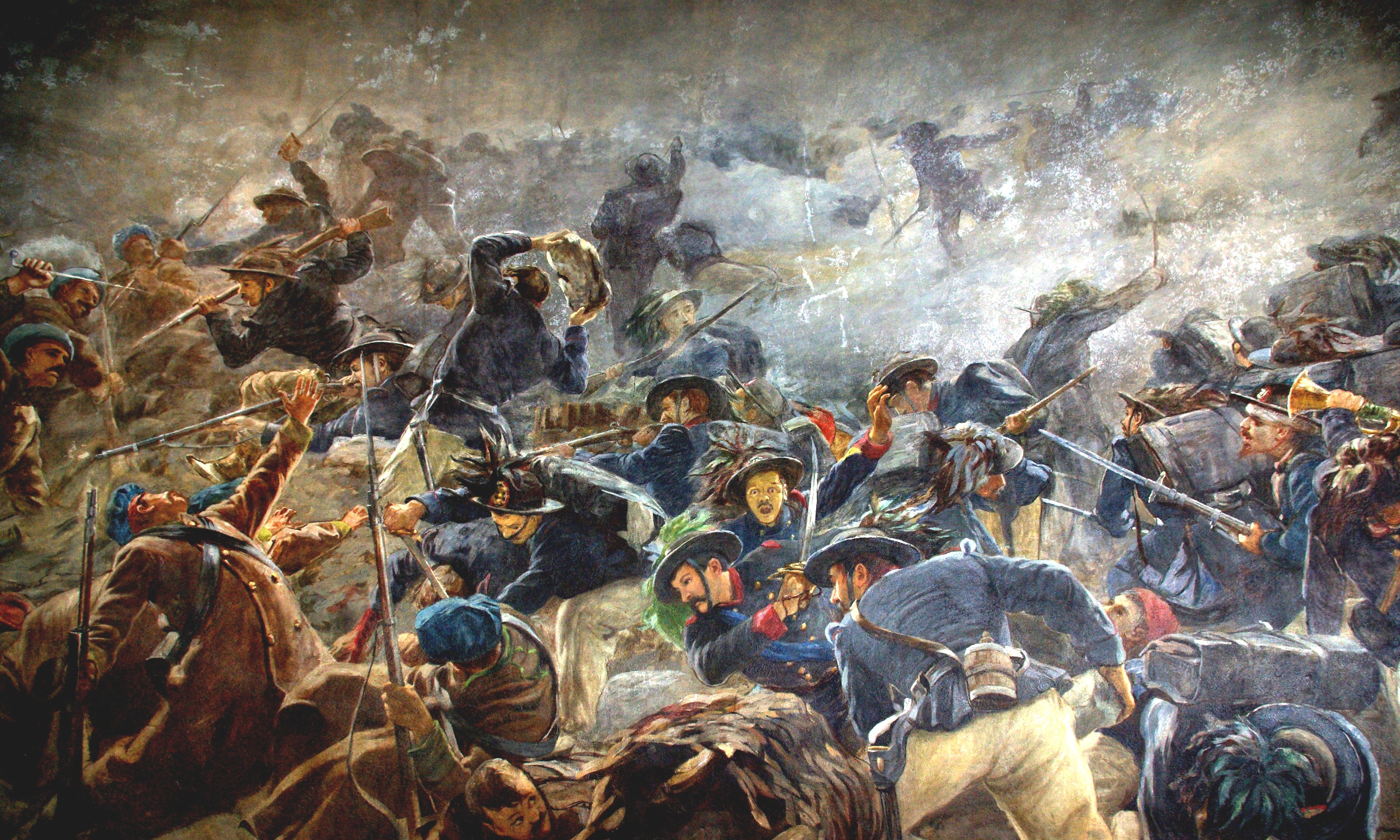
The Bersaglieri halt the Russian attack during the Battle of the Chernaya.

The relatively poor Kingdom of Sardinia could not afford large numbers of cavalry, so a quick-moving infantry corps of marksmen were needed. These troops were trained to high physical and marksmanship standards. Like the French chasseurs à pied, a level of independence and initiative was encouraged so that they could operate in looser formations, in which direct command and control was not required. They fired individually and carried 60 rounds instead of the standard 40 rounds of traditional line infantry. The first uniform was black with brimmed hats, called "vaira". These were intended to defend the head from sabre blows.

The first public appearance of the Bersaglieri was on the occasion of a military parade on 1 July 1836. The First Company marched through Turin with the rapid, high-stepping gait (180 paces/minute) still used by the Bersaglieri in World War II and later. The modern Bersaglieri still run both on parade and even during barracks duty – on penalty of punishment if they do not. The new corps impressed King Charles Albert, who immediately had them integrated as part of the Piedmontese regular army. The corps grew rapidly and by 1852 there were already 10 battalions, each with four companies.

Throughout the nineteenth century the Bersaglieri filled the role of skirmishers, screening the slow-moving line and column formations, but acting as special shock troops if required. They were originally intended to serve as mountain troops, as well; the climber Jean-Antoine Carrel was a Bersagliere. When the Alpini Corps were created in 1872 a strong rivalry arose between the two elite corps.

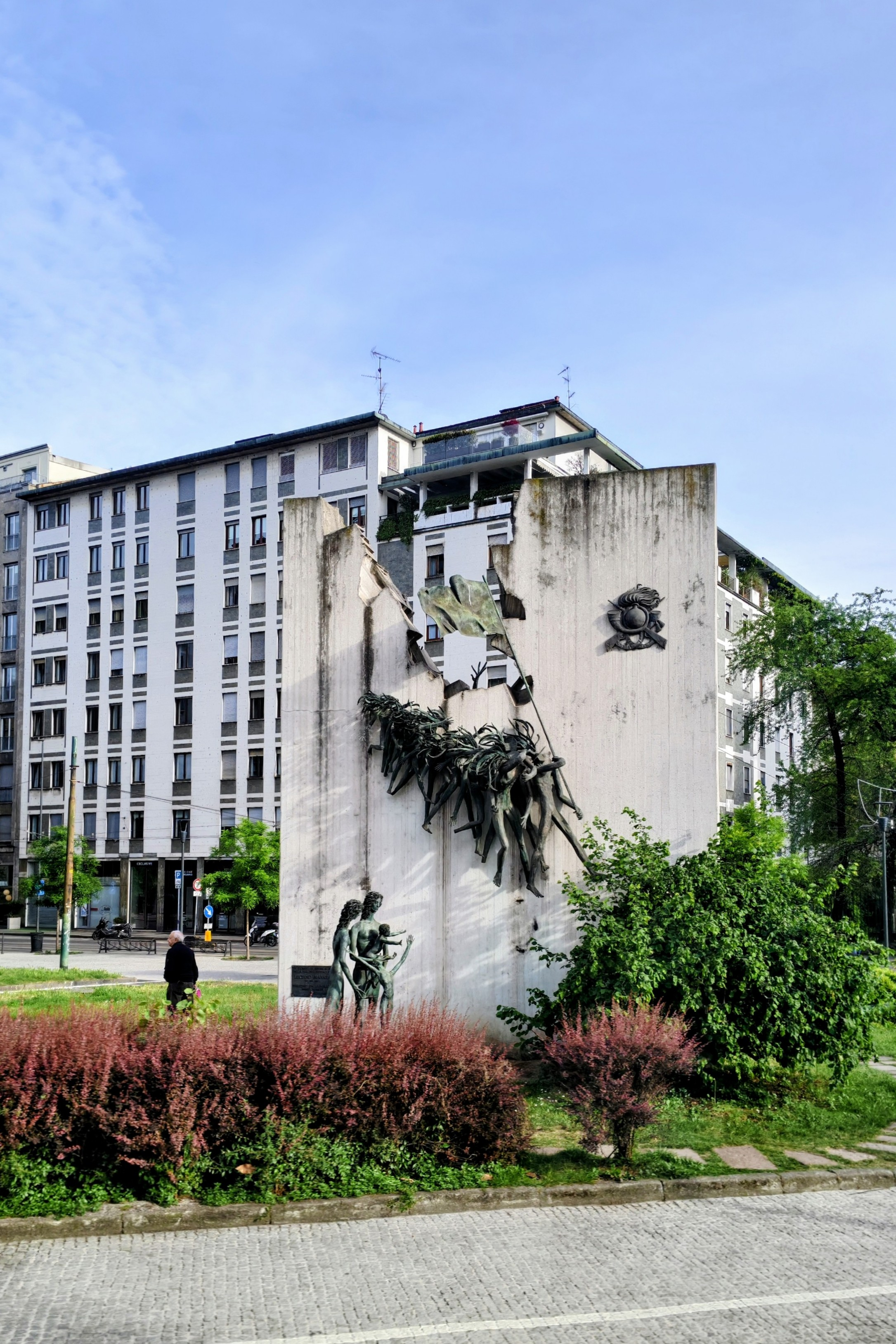
Monument to the Bersaglieri in Milan, Italy

== Unified Italy ==
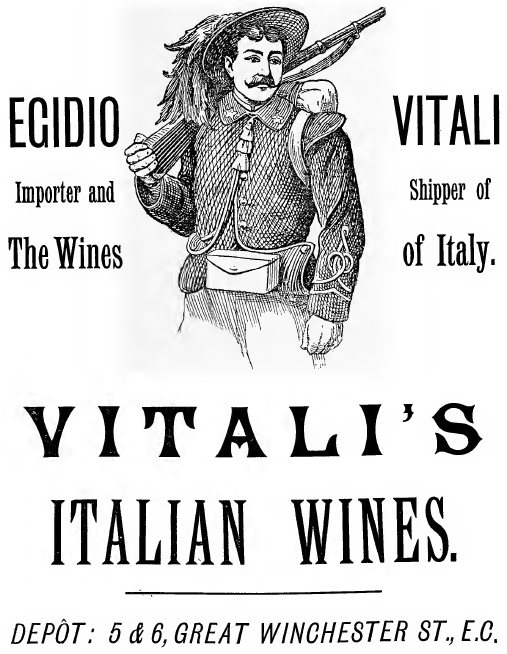
British commercial advertising showing a Bersagliere, circa 1890

During the First War of Italian Independence (1848–1849) the Bersaglieri distinguished themselves by storming the bridge at Goito in an episode known to later historiography as the Battle of Goito Bridge (la Battaglia del Ponte di Goito). In 1855 the Bersaglieri provided five battalions for the Sardinian expeditionary corps in the Crimean War, where they were involved in the Siege of Sevastopol and the Battle of the Chernaya. Most of the casualties were suffered due to a cholera epidemic. Their bravery at the Cernaia was widely recognized and played a key role in gaining Piedmont-Sardinia a seat in the negotiations at the war's end. For their effort in the Crimea, the Bersaglieri were rewarded a red fez with a blue tassel, in honour from the French zouaves troops, with whom they served, as they watched the Bersaglieri's bravery in the battle.

When the Armata Sarda became the Regio Esercito (Royal Italian Army) in 1860, the existing 36 battalions were used to create six Bersaglieri regiments, which had administrative and disciplinary duties. The regiments were assigned to the army corps', with the regiment's battalions assigned to the divisions in the corps as reconnaissance units.

- 1st Bersaglieri Regiment under I Army Corps with the I, IX, XIII, XIX, XXI and XXVII battalions
- 2nd Bersaglieri Regiment under II Army Corps with the II, IV, X, XV, XVII and XVIII battalions
- 3rd Bersaglieri Regiment under III Army Corps with the III, V, VIII, XX, XXIII and XXV battalions
- 4th Bersaglieri Regiment under IV Army Corps with the VI, VII, XI, XII, XXXV and XXXVI battalions
- 5th Bersaglieri Regiment under V Army Corps with the XIV, XVI, XXII, XXIV, XXVI and XXXIV battalions
- 6th Bersaglieri Regiment under VI Army Corps with the XXVIII, XXIX, XXX, XXXI, XXXII and XXXIII battalions

The most famous action of the Bersaglieri occurred on 20 September 1870, when the XII Bersaglieri Battalion stormed Rome through a breach created by Italian artillery in the Aurelian Walls near Porta Pia leading to the capture of Rome and end of the temporal power of the Pope, thus completing the unification of Italy. A monument was erected in 1932 in front of Porta Pia to commemorate the event at the same time as the National Museum of the Bersaglieri corps was moved to Porta Pia, where it resides still today.

In 1871, the Bersaglieri corps added another four battalions and the regiments were increased from six to 10 and given also operational command of the battalions. In 1883 a further two regiments were added for a total of 12 Bersaglieri regiments, one for each army corps with three battalions per regiment. Therefore, the four battalions raised in 1871 were disbanded.

- 1st Bersaglieri Regiment under I Army Corps with the I, VII and IX battalions
- 2nd Bersaglieri Regiment under II Army Corps with the II, IV, and XVII battalions
- 3rd Bersaglieri Regiment under III Army Corps with the XVIII, XX, and XXV battalions
- 4th Bersaglieri Regiment under IV Army Corps with the XXVI, XXIX and XXXI battalions
- 5th Bersaglieri Regiment under V Army Corps with the XIV, XXII and XXIV battalions
- 6th Bersaglieri Regiment under VI Army Corps with the VI, XIII and XIX battalions
- 7th Bersaglieri Regiment under VII Army Corps with the VIII, X and XI battalions
- 8th Bersaglieri Regiment under VIII Army Corps with the III, V and XII battalions
- 9th Bersaglieri Regiment under IX Army Corps with the XXVIII, XXX and XXXII battalions
- 10th Bersaglieri Regiment under X Army Corps with the XVI, XXXIV and XXXV battalions
- 11th Bersaglieri Regiment under XI Army Corps with the XV, XXVII and XXXIII battalions
- 12th Bersaglieri Regiment under XII Army Corps with the XXI, XXIII and XXXVI battalions

== World War I ==
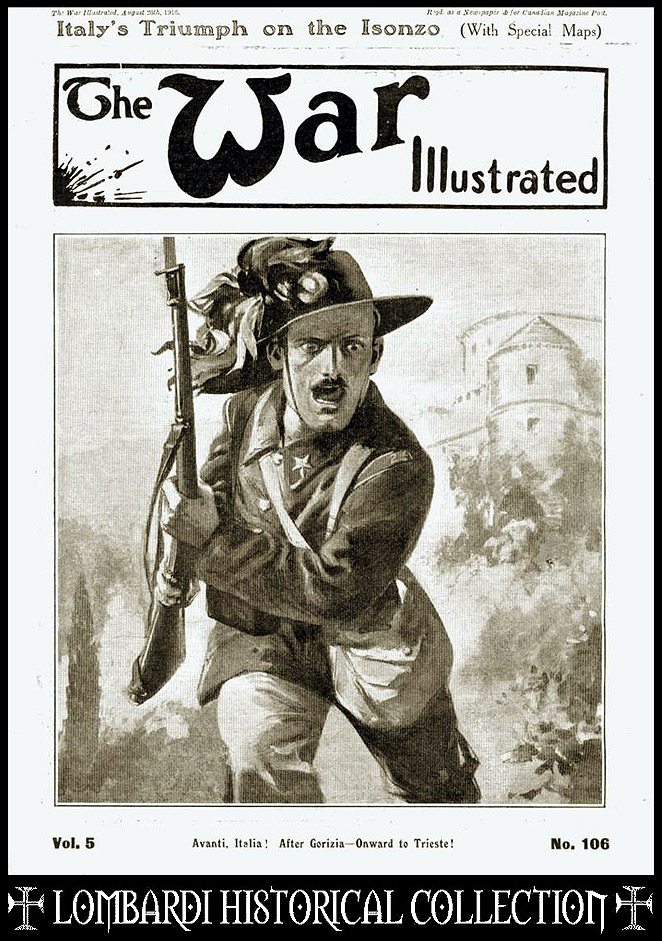
'AVANTI ITALIA!': The War Illustrated, Vol.5, No.106, Aug., 1916

During World War I, the 12 existing Bersaglieri regiments were augmented by nine newly raised regiments and fought with distinction on the Italian Front. Of the 210,000 members of Bersaglieri regiments, 32,000 were killed and 50,000 wounded during the war. Italy's last surviving World War I veteran, Delfino Borroni, was a member of the 6th Bersaglieri Regiment from Bologna. Another member who served as Bersagliere on the front (and was wounded) was Benito Mussolini.

A contingent of Bersaglieri drawn from the autonomous battalions of the 1st Bersaglieri Regiment was sent to participate in the Sinai and Palestine Campaign in 1917, where they were attached to the Egyptian Expeditionary Force commanded by General Edmund Allenby. Their "mainly political" role was to assert "hereditary ecclesiastical prerogatives in connection with the Christian churches at Jerusalem and Bethlehem".

=== Peacetime regiments ===
At the outbreak of World War I in 1914 the Bersaglieri corps consisted of 12 regiments each organized into a regimental HQ, three Bersaglieri battalions, and one Bersaglieri cyclists battalion. Each regiment also contained a machine gun section with two machine guns. The Bersaglieri battalions consisted of three companies of 250 men each, while the cyclists battalions consisted of three companies of 150 men each. Additionally, each cyclists battalion had its own machine gun section with two machine guns. Between the outbreak of the war and the Italian declaration of war on 23 May 1915 the Italian army was forced to send the 1st Bersaglieri Regiment and five battalions from other Bersaglieri regiments to Libya as the local population fiercely resisted the Italian occupation. On 29 December 1914 the army sent the 10th Bersaglieri Regiment to Albania, which was in turmoil after its freshly installed ruler William, Prince of Albania had fled the country in September 1914. Already since 4 May 1912 two battalions of the 4th Bersaglieri Regiment were in Rhodes to garrison the newly conquered Italian Islands of the Aegean.

With war imminent the army began to raise new Bersaglieri battalions to replace the battalions deployed overseas and on 8 April 1915, the 10th bis Bersaglieri Regiment was formed to replace the 10th deployed in Albania. Starting in January 1915 additional battalions were raised, which remained autonomous and were not integrated into an existing regiment. When hostilities commenced the Bersaglieri consisted of:

- 13 regiments (one in Libya, one in Albania, eleven in Italy)
- 55 Bersaglieri battalions (41 grouped in 13 regiments (two deployed to Rhodes); 14 autonomous battalions, of which seven in Libya and seven at the Italian Front)
- 12 Bersaglieri cyclists battalions

On 10 January 1916 the High Command ordered to increase all Bersaglieri battalions by one company to four companies, with the battalions deployed to Libya being exempt and remaining on three companies. Later that spring the companies of the Bersaglieri battalions were reduced from 250 to 225 men, but in turn each battalion received its own machine gun section with two machine guns, a submachine-gun section with two Villar Perosa submachine guns, and a Sapper unit with 88 men. On 3 March 1916 the regimental command of the 1st Bersaglieri Regiment was disbanded and its battalions became autonomous.

At the end of 1916 the Bersaglieri fielded:

- 15 regiments (one in Albania, 14 in Italy)
- 48 Bersaglieri battalions (45 grouped in 15 regiments and three autonomous battalions). Each of these battalions consisted of four companies of 225 men each, a sapper unit, a machine-gun section, and two submachine-gun sections
- 15 autonomous Bersaglieri battalions (two deployed to Rhodes, thirteen in Libya). Each of these battalions consisted of three companies of 250 men each and a machine-gun section
- 12 Bersaglieri cyclists battalions, each with three companies of 150 men and a machine-gun section

Early in 1917 each battalion in Italy received a second submachine-gun section and in May the battalions were thoroughly reorganized: the machine gun sections of each battalion were increased to a machine gun company with six machine guns, while the battalion's 4th companies were grouped in independent "marching" battalions (Battaglione di Marcia), which acted as personnel reserve for the armies deployed to the front.

After the defeat at Caporetto the Italian army was forced to retreat from the Isonzo river to the Piave river. During the retreat four Bersaglieri regiments and three autonomous battalions were so badly mauled that they had to be disbanded: besides the wartime regiments 15 and 21, also the peacetime regiments 4 and 9 were disbanded. Thus at the end of 1917 the Bersaglieri corps consisted of:

- 16 regiments (one in Albania, 15 in Italy)
- 48 Bersaglieri battalions (grouped in 16 regiments). Each of these battalions consisted of three companies of 225 men each, a machine gun company, a sapper unit, and two submachine-gun sections.
- 15 autonomous Bersaglieri battalions (two deployed to Rhodes, ten in Libya). Each of these battalions consisted of three companies of 250 men each and a machine-gun section
- 12 Bersaglieri cyclists battalions, each with three companies of 150 men and a machine-gun section

After the Battle of Caporetto the Chief of Staff of the Italian Army Luigi Cadorna was finally dismissed and replaced by Armando Diaz. Diaz reorganized the army and ordered the Bersaglieri battalions to be reorganized: the companies were reduced to 150 men in three platoons – two of infantry and one of sappers and combat support troops. At the same, the machine-gun companies were increased to eight machine guns, and the submachine-gun sections increased to three and attached to the companies. Each battalion also received a Stokes mortar section, while each regiment received a flamethrower section and a "reparto cannoncini d'accompagnamento" (loosely translated: small accompaniment cannons unit), with Italian copies of the Austrian 3.7cm Infantry Gun M.15. Additionally the command of the 16th Bersaglieri Regiment was disbanded and its battalions became autonomous, six of the autonomous battalions deployed to Libya were ordered to return and reorganized as the other battalions on the Italian front. The cyclists battalions were also reorganized (see the "Cyclists Battalions" section here below).

At the onset of the last offensive of the war the Bersaglieri was organized on the following structure:

- 15 regiments (one in Albania, 14 in Italy)
- 45 Bersaglieri battalions (grouped in 15 regiments). Each of these battalions consisted of three companies of 150 men each, a machine gun company, three submachine-gun sections, and a Stokes mortar section
- 12 autonomous Bersaglieri battalions (two deployed to Rhodes, four in Libya, and six battalions assigned to the two divisions of the Assault Army Corps. The overseas battalions consisted of three companies of 250 men each and a machine gun section, while the six battalions of the Assault Army Corps were organized as the regimental battalions
- 8 Bersaglieri cyclists battalions, each with three companies of 150 men and a machine gun section (six in two groups and attached to cavalry divisions, and two assigned to the Assault Army Corps)

Peacetime regiments
Regiment	Battalions	Based in	Notes	Battles
1st Bersaglieri	I VII; IX; I Cyc.	Naples	Regiment (without the I Cyclists Bn.) deployed in Libya; Regimental command disbanded 3 March 1916; battalions became autonomous Regiment raised the: 21st Bersaglieri Regiment LV Autonomous Battalion	I, VII, IX battalions: 19 May 1915: arrived in Libya 28 May 1918: returned to Italy 29 June 1918: entered 1st Assault Div. 1918: Battle of Vittorio Veneto: Sernaglia I Cyclists: 1915: Fogliano, Monte Sei Busi, Sella San Martino 1916: Trincea delle Frasche, Asiago, Coston di Lora, Monte Pasubio, Monte Fior, Marcesina 1917: Castagnevizza, Piave, Forcella Muis, Forcella Campidello, Lestans, Sequals 1918: Caposile, Fossalta, Capo d'Argine, Monte Castellazzo, Vittorio Veneto
2nd Bersaglieri	(II); IV; XVII; LIII; II Cyc.	Rome	29 Aug. 1918: VII Bersaglieri Bde. II Bn. in Libya; 24 June 1918: II Cyclists disbanded Regiment raised the: 14th Bersaglieri Regiment LIII Bn. (to replace II Bn.) LIV Autonomous Battalion LXI Bn. (for the 14th Rgt.) LXIV Bn. (for the 17th Rgt.) XXVI Assault Battalion	1915: Monte Coston, Costa d'Agra, Monte Maronia, Val di Sole; 1916: Plezzo, Oslavia, Zaibena, Nad Logem, Monte Kuk; 1917 Monte Santo, Monte Mrzli, Monte Pleca, Kamno, Monte Stol, Sequals, Piave; 1918: Montello, Vittorio Veneto: Paradiso
3rd Bersaglieri	XVIII; XX; XXV; III Cyc.	Livorno	29 Aug. 1918: VII Bersaglieri Bde. Regiment raised the: 13th Bersaglieri Regiment XL Bn. (for the 14th Rgt.) LII Autonomous Battalion LX Bn. (for the 13th Rgt.) LXV Bn. (for the 17th Rgt.)	1915: Col di Lana, Carso: Vermegliano, Monte Sei Busi; 1916: Selz: quota 70 – Monte Sief, Piccolo Colbricon, Val Cismon, Carso: Monfalcone, quota 85, Jamiano, quota 144; 1917 Carso: Flondar, Monte Ermada – Monfenera, Piave: Zenson, Ponte di Pinzano; 1918: Monte Costalunga, 2nd Piave: Fosso Gorgazzo, Fossalta, Meolo – Vittorio Veneto: Serravalle, Fadalto Pass, Pieve di Cadore
4th Bersaglieri	(XXVI); XXIX (XXXI); XXXVII; XLIII; IV Cyc.	Turin	18 June – 7 Nov. 1917: V Bersaglieri Bde. XXVI Bn. and XXXI Bn. in Rhodes; 9 Dec. 1917: Rgt. disbanded (Caporetto) Regiment raised the: 19th Bersaglieri Regiment 20th Bersaglieri Regiment XXXVII Bn. (to replace XXXI Bn.) XLI Autonomous Battalion XLII Autonomous Battalion Regiment received the XLIII Bn. from the 9th Rgt. as replacement for the XXVI Bn.	1915: Isonzo: Ajba – St. Lucia di Tolmino; 1916: St. Maria di Tolmino, Monte Mrzli, Zagora, Monfalcone, quota 85; 1917: Bodrez, Semmer, Monte Fratta, Bainsizza: Ossoiuka, Oscedrilk, Monte Globokak, Monte Badenecche, Monte Tonderecar; 1918: Monfenera, San Bartolomeo di Piave, Molino Novo, Grave di Papadopoli, Vittorio Veneto: Maniago, Flagogna, Tolmezzo
5th Bersaglieri	XIV (XXII); XXIV; XLVI; V Cyc.	Sanremo	1 March 1918: V Bersaglieri Bde. XXII Bn. in Libya; Regiment raised the: XLVI Bn. (to replace XXII Bn.) XLVII Autonomous Battalion LXXII Assault Battalion	1915: Isonzo: Santa Lucia, Alture di Polazzo – Monte Mrzli; 1916: Isonzo: Dolje, Monte Mrzli, Monte Vodil – Asiago: Monte Lemerle, Magnaboschi, Kaberlaba – Carso: Monfalcone, quota 85, quota 121, Nova Vas, quota 208, Jamiano, quota 144; 1917: Monte Gallio, Monte Sisemol, Monte Melago, Col del Rosso; 1918: Monte Valbella, Sernaglia
6th Bersaglieri	VI; XIII; XIX; VI Cyc.	Bologna	15 Feb. 1916: I Bersaglieri Bde. 24 June 1918: VI Cyclists disbanded Regiment raised the: 15th Bersaglieri Regiment XLIX Autonomous Battalion L Autonomous Battalion	1915: Plezzo; 1916: Carso: Veliki Hribach, Pečinka, quota 308; 1917: Isonzo: Monte Vodice – Bainsizza: Semmer, Oscedrilk, quota 808 – Monte Globokak, Pradamano, Monte Tonderecar; 1918: Monte Cornone: Sasso Rosso
7th Bersaglieri	VIII; X (XI); XLIV; VII Cyc.	Brescia	6 Nov. 1916: II Bersaglieri Bde. XI Bn. in Libya; Regiment raised the: XLIV Bn. (to replace XI Bn.) XLV Autonomous Battalion all Fiat–Revelli Modello 1914 equipped Bersaglieri Machine Gunner Companies	1915: Val di Ledro: Bezzecca, Monte Vies; 1916–17 Carso: Jamiano, quota 144, Flondar; 1918: 2nd Piave, Vittorio Veneto, Occupation of Triest
8th Bersaglieri	(III); V XII; XXXVIII; VIII Cyc.	Verona	1 June 1918: VI Bersaglieri Bde. III Battalion: until 28 May 1918 in Libya 29 June 1918: entered 2nd Assault Div. Regiment raised the: XXXVIII Bn. (to replace III Bn.) XLVIII Autonomous Battalion XXII Assault Battalion	1915–17: Cadore; Candelù, Fagarè, Caserta island (Piave river), Vittorio Veneto: Piave, Livenza, Tagliamento, Ariis, Paradiso
9th Bersaglieri	XXVIII; XXX; XXXII; IX Cyc.	Asti	11 Feb. – 6 Nov. 1916: II Bersaglieri Bde. 28 Nov. 1917: Rgt. disbanded (Caporetto); 24 June 1918: X Cyclists disbanded Regiment raised the: XLIII Bn. (as replacement for the XXVI Bn. of the 4th Rgt.) LIX Bn. (for the 13th Rgt.)	Regiment: 1915: Plezzo, Oslavia 1916: Oslavia, Monte Zebio, Monte Colombara, Carso: Nad Logem, Gorizia 1917: Monte Ermada, Monte Ortigara, Monte Forno, Agnello Pass, Monte Pleca, Monte Kozliak, Monte Carnizza IX Cyclists: 1918: 2nd Piave
10th Bersaglieri	XVI; XXXIV; XXXV; X Cyc.	Palermo	29 Dec. 1914: Rgt. deployed to Albania; 24 June 1918: X Cyclists disbanded Regiment raised the: 16th Bersaglieri Regiment LVII Bn. (for the 16th Rgt.) LVIII Bn. (for the 16th Rgt.) LXIII Bn. (for the 16th Rgt.) LXIX Bn. (for the 18th Rgt.)	Regiment: 1915–1918 Albania X Cyclists: 1915: Canina 1916: Forcella Omladet 1917: Monte Santo, Bainsizza, Valsugana, Monte Tomba Cormons, Santa Lucia di Polcenigo 1918: Fagarè, Fossalta, Scolo Palumbo
11th Bersaglieri	(XV); XXVII; XXXIII; XXXIX; XI Cyc.	Ancona	11 Feb. 1916: II Bersaglieri Bde. XV Battalion: until 28 May 1918 in Libya 9 July 1918: entered 2nd Assault Div. Regiment raised the: 17th Bersaglieri Regiment XXXIX Bn. (to replace XV Bn.) LI Autonomous Battalion LXVI Bn. (for the 17th Rgt.) LXVII Bn. (for the 18th Rgt.)	Regiment: 1915: Carso: Monte San Michele, Plezzo, Monte Javorcek 1916: Monfalcone: quota 85, quota 93, quota 144 1917: Carso: Jamiano, Flondar – Monte Piana, Mauria Pass 1918: Stretta di Serravalle, Revine Lago, Occupation of Triest XI Cyclists: 1915: Gradisca, Lucinico, Monte San Michele 1916: Vermegliano, Cave di Sels, Monfalcone 1917: Doberdò, Flondar, Sella Nevea, Forcella la Croce, Monfenera 1918: 2nd Piave, Monte Grappa, Revine Lago
12th Bersaglieri	XXI; XXIII; XXXVI; XII Cyc.	Milan	15 Feb. 1916: I Bersaglieri Bde. Regiment raised the: 18th Bersaglieri Regiment LVI Autonomous Battalion LXVIII Bn. (for the 18th Rgt.)	1915: Monte Mrzli, Monte Sleme; 1916: Carso: Veliki Hribach, Pečinka, quota 308, Vippacco; 1917: Isonzo: Monte Vodice – Bainsizza: Semmer, Oscedrilk – Monte Globokak, Pradamano, Melette di Gallio; 1918: Val Frenzela: Pizzo Razzea – Vittorio Veneto

=== Regiments raised during the war ===
At the outbreak of the war the army fielded 13 Bersaglieri regiments: the twelve peacetime regiments and the 10th bis Bersaglieri Regiment, which had been raised with new battalions on 8 April 1915 to replace the 10th Bersaglieri Regiment sent to Vlorë in Albania on 29 December 1914. During 1915 two more regiments were raised; the 1st bis Bersaglieri Regiment with three autonomous battalions and then 13th Bersaglieri Regiment with three new battalions:

- 8 April 1915: 10th bis Bersaglieri Regiment
- 8–25 June 1915: 13th Provisional Bersaglieri Regiment. The regiment was formed from new battalions and meant to replace the 1st Bersaglieri Regiment deployed to Libya, but it became never operational, and upon reaching the front the regiment was disbanded and its battalions became autonomous.
- 24 September 1915: 1st bis Bersaglieri Regiment, formed from the three autonomous of the short-lived 13th Provisional Bersaglieri Regiment
- 22 November 1915: 13th Bersaglieri Regiment

On 5 January 1916 the 1st bis Bersaglieri Regiment changed its name and became the 15th Bersaglieri Regiment, while on the same date the 10th bis Bersaglieri Regiment changed its name and became 16th Bersaglieri Regiment. During 1916 only one new regiment was raised: the 14th Bersaglieri Regiment on 11 March with two newly formed and one autonomous battalion.

In 1917 the army raised five new Bersaglieri regiments: the 17th and 18th regiments with newly raised battalions, the 19th regiment with three autonomous battalions, and the 20th and 21st regiments with reserve battalions.

- 31 Jan. 1917: 18th Bersaglieri Regiment
- 6 Feb. 1917: 17th Bersaglieri Regiment
- 15 Feb. 1917: 19th Bersaglieri Regiment
- 1 April 1917: 20th Bersaglieri Regiment
- 27 April 1917: 21st Bersaglieri Regiment

Due to the defeat at the Battle of Caporetto the army was forced to disbanded the 15th and the 21st Bersaglieri regiments with their battalions in November 1917. In 1918 the command of the 16th Bersaglieri Regiment was disbanded and its three battalions became autonomous.

After the war four of the regiments raised for the conflict were disbanded (13th, 14th, 17th, 18th), while the 19th Bersaglieri Regiment was renamed 4th Bersaglieri Regiment, and the 20th Bersaglieri Regiment was renamed 9th Bersaglieri Regiment. Of the nine regiments raised during the war none, except for 18th Bersaglieri Regiment, was ever activated again. The 18th was active again from 1 April 1935 until 31 December 1936, from 1 February 1942 until 8 September 1943, and for the last time from 10 September 1993 until 1 January 2005.

Regiments raised during the war
Regiment	Battalions	Raised on Raised by	Notes	Battles
13th Bersaglieri	LIX; LX; LXII	22 Nov. 1915; 3rd Ber. LX; 9th Ber. LXI; 11th Ber. LXII	1 Jan. 1918: VI Bersaglieri Bde. 1919: disbanded	1916: Alpi di Fassa; 1917: Monte Pertica, Monte Grappa; 1918: Caposile, Candelù, Breda, Cima Ninni, Vittorio Veneto: Grave di Papadopoli
14th Bersaglieri	XL; LIV; LXI	11 March 1916; 2nd Ber. LIV, LXI; 3rd Ber. XL	Raised from two new (XL, LXI) and one autonomous battalion (LIV); 1 April 1917: IV Bersaglieri Bde. 12 April 1919: Rgt. disbanded	1916: San Michele, Asiago, Marcesina, Monte Zebio; 1917: Val d'Astico, Val Posina, Borgo, Luico, Monte Sisemol; 1918: Monte Valbella, 2nd Piave, Vittorio Veneto: Trento
15th Bersaglieri	XLIX; L LI	5 Jan. 1916; 6th Ber. XLIX, L 11th Ber. LI	Raised from three autonomous battalions: XLIX Bn. raised Jan. 1915 L Bn. raised Jan. 1915 LI Bn. raised 1915 24 Sep. 1915 – 5 Jan. 1916: 1st bis Bersaglieri Rgt. 7 Nov. 1917: Rgt. disbanded (Caporetto)	1915: Redipuglia, Third Isonzo: Trincea delle Frasche; 1916: Monfalcone, Monte Sei Busi, Doberdò, Jamiano: quota 208 sud 1917: Caporetto
16th Bersaglieri	LVII; LVIII; LXIII	5 Jan. 1916; 10th Bersaglieri	8 April 1915 – 5 Jan. 1916: 10th bis Bersaglieri Rgt. with XVI bis, XXXIV bis, XXXV bis 7 March 1918: Rgt. disbanded and battalions transferred to other units	1915: Monte Mrzli, Monte Vodil; 1916: Pal Piccolo; 1917: Ampezzano, Monte Iof, Meduna river
17th Bersaglieri	LXIV; LXV; LXVI	6 Feb. 1917; 2nd Ber. LXIV; 3rd Ber. LXV; 11th Ber. LXVI	6 Feb. 1917: III Bersaglieri Bde. March 1919: Rgt. disbanded	1917: Valsugana, Castagnevizza, Tagliamento: Bridge of Madrisio, Piave: Cà Lunga; 1918: Cavazuccherina, Cortellazzo, Vittorio Veneto: Giudicarie
18th Bersaglieri	LXVII; LXVIII; LXIX	31 Jan. 1917; 10th Ber. LXIX; 11th Ber. LXVII; 12th Ber. LXVIII	6 Feb. 1917: III Bersaglieri Bde. 31 Dec. 1919: Rgt. disbanded	1917: Castagnevizza: quota 244, Piave: Fagarè, Cà Lunga; 1918: 2nd Piave, Vittorio Veneto: Castel Romano/Val Chiese
19th Bersaglieri	XLI; XLII; XLV	15 Feb. 1917; 4th Ber. XLI, XLII; 7th Ber. XLV	Raised from three autonomous battalions: XLI Bn. raised 7 Jan. 1915 XLII Bn. raised 22 Feb. 1915 XLV Bn. raised 19 May 1915 1 March 1918: V Bersaglieri Bde. 11 Jan. 1919: renamed 4th Bersaglieri	1915: XLI Bn: Monte Maronia, Monte Plan XLII Bn: Loppio XLV Bn: Val Chiese: Monte Merlino 1916: XLI Bn: Cima Cece, Cima Valmaggiore, Nova Vas XLII Bn: Mori, Malga Zugna XLV Bn: Coste di Salò, Monfalcone 1917: Val Degano, Longarone; 1918: Cima Tre Pezzi, Vittorio Veneto: Piave crossing
20th Bersaglieri	LXX; LXXI; LXXII	1 April 1917; 4th Bersaglieri	Raised from the II, IV, VI Bersaglieri reserve battalions 1 April 1917: IV Bersaglieri Bde. 20 Feb. 1919: renamed 9th Bersaglieri	1917: Carzano, Lunico, Monte Sisemol; 1918: Monte Valbella, Monte Maio, Vittorio Veneto: Passo Borcola, Monte Maggio
21st Bersaglieri	LXXIII; LXXIV; LXXV	27 April 1917; 1st Bersaglieri	Raised from the VII, X, XI Bersaglieri reserve battalions 18 June 1917: V Bersaglieri Bde. 7 Nov. 1917: Rgt. disbanded (Caporetto)	1917: Plava: Monte Kuk/Monte Vodice, Bainsizza: Fratta, Semmer, quota 898 – Monte Globokak

=== Cyclists battalions ===
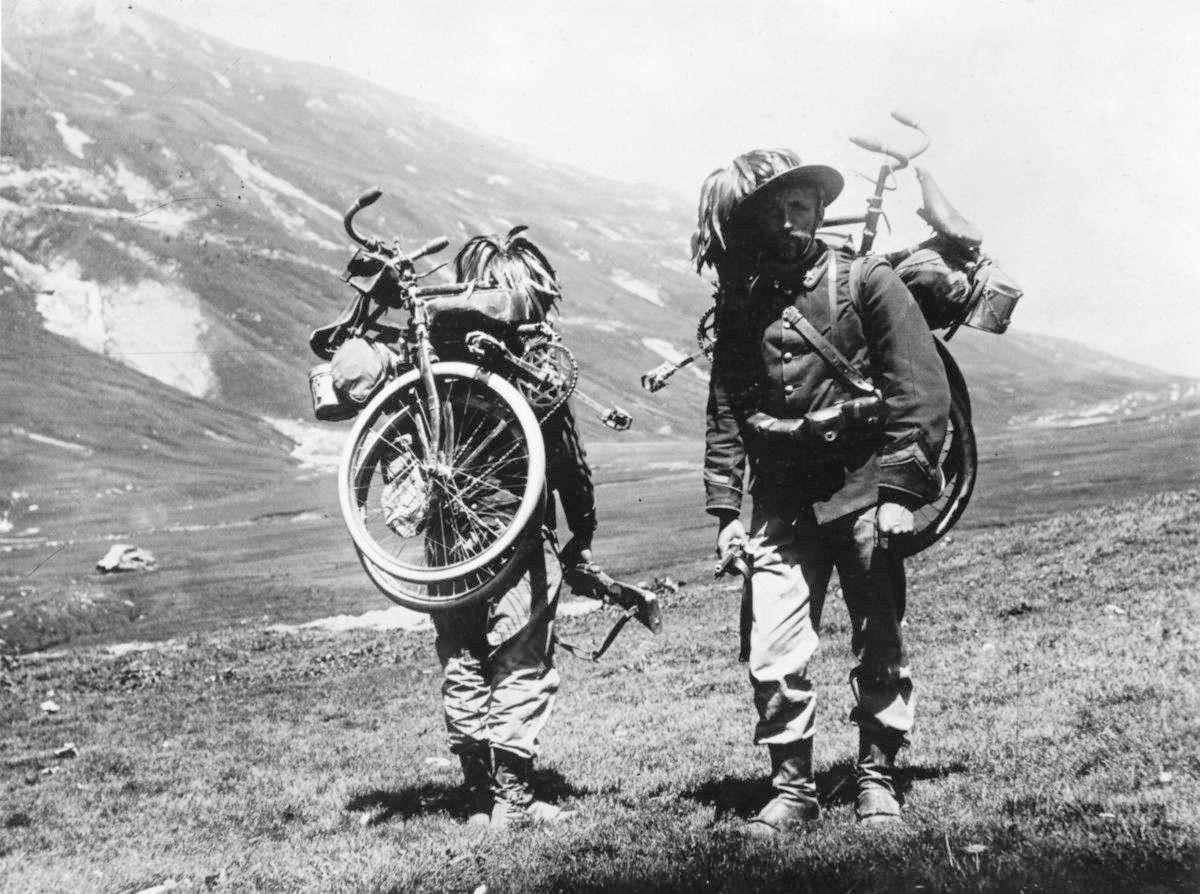
Bersaglieri cyclists in 1915

The twelve cyclists battalions of the peacetime regiments had been raised in 1910. Each consisted of three companies of 150 men, and a machine gun section with two machine guns. For the duration of the war the cyclists battalions operated independently from their regiments and were assigned as needed to higher commands. On various occasions Bersaglieri Cyclists Battalion Groups were formed, but only after the Battle of Caporetto forced the Italian army to retreat from the Isonzo front, during which the cyclists battalions served as rearguard, did the army institute permanent cyclists groups. These four groups were officially instituted on 15 January 1918 and each fielded three cyclists battalions and formed initially the mobile reserve of the Third Army on the lower Piave river:

- 1st Group: IV, V, XII cyclists battalions
- 2nd Group: II, X, XI cyclists battalions
- 3rd Group: I, VII, VIII cyclists battalions
- 4th Group: III, VI, IX cyclists battalions

In April and May 1918 the 1st and 2nd Group were assigned to the 1st, respectively the 7th Army to defend the Western, respectively the Eastern shore of Lake Garda from possible Austro-Hungarian amphibious landings. By June all four groups had returned to the 3rd Army and were assigned to the army's corps as mobile reserve (1st Group to XI Corps, 2nd Group to XXVIII Corps, 3rd Group as army reserve, 4th Group to XXIII Corps).

On 24 June 1918 the 2nd and 4th group and the II, VI, IX, and X battalions were disbanded and with their troops the Cyclists Assault Battalion was formed. This battalion was assigned to the Assault Army Corps (Corpo d'Armata d'Assalto), which consisted of Bersaglieri and Arditi troops. The surviving III and XI cyclists battalions were assigned to 1st, respectively the 2nd Assault Division of the same carmy corps. The two remaining groups, the 1st and 3rd, left the 3rd Army on 16 October 1918 and were assigned for the last offensive of the war to the 1st, respectively 4th Cavalry division.

=== Autonomous battalions ===
During World War I the Bersaglieri regiments raised a number of battalions, which were not attached to a regiment and designated as "autonomous battalions". At the same time seven battalions of pre-war regiments, which were deployed to the Italian colonies, became autonomous and were replaced in their regiments by newly raised battalions. The 1st Bersaglieri Regiment was deployed to Italian Libya and its three battalions became autonomous in February 1916 when the regimental command returned to the mainland. Of the autonomous battalions raised during the war only the LII and LV battalions remaining autonomous and active for the entire duration of the conflict.

Autonomous battalions
Battalion	Raised on Raised by	Deployed to	Notes
XLI Battalion	7 Jan. 1915; 4th Bersaglieri	Italian Front	15 Feb. 1917: entered 19th Bersaglieri
XLII Battalion	22 Feb. 1915; 4th Bersaglieri	Italian Front	15 Feb. 1917: entered 19th Bersaglieri
XLV Battalion	19 May 1915; 7th Bersaglieri	Italian Front	15 Feb. 1917: entered 19th Bersaglieri
XLVII Battalion	1 Feb. 1915; 5th Bersaglieri	Italian Front	18 Nov. 1917: disbanded (Caporetto)
XLVIII Battalion	6 Feb. 1915; 8th Bersaglieri	Italian Front	10 Nov. 1917: destroyed (Caporetto)
XLIX Battalion	Jan. 1915; 6th Bersaglieri	Italian Front	5 Jan. 1916: entered 15th Bersaglieri
L Battalion	Jan. 1915; 6th Bersaglieri	Italian Front	5 Jan. 1916: entered 15th Bersaglieri
LI Battalion	1915; 11th Bersaglieri	Italian Front	5 Jan. 1916: entered 15th Bersaglieri
LII Battalion	Jan. 1915; 3rd Bersaglieri	Libya	
LIV Battalion	1915; 2nd Bersaglieri	Italian Front	11 March 1916: 14th Bersaglieri Rgt.
LV Battalion	5 Jan. 1915; 1st Bersaglieri	1915–18: Libya; 1918: Italian Front	In Libya until 31 May 1918, returned to Italy and entered 6th Group/2nd Assault Division
LVI Battalion	17 Jan. 1915; 12th Bersaglieri	Italian Front	18 Nov. 1917: disbanded (Caporetto)

During the war a number of battalions of existing regiments became autonomous either for geographic reasons (battalion deployed to the colonies) or organizational reasons (regimental command disbanded). The following table gives an overview of these battalions:

Temporarily autonomous battalions
Battalion	Regiment	Deployed to	Notes
I Battalion	1st Bersaglieri	1915–18: Libya; 1918: Italian Front	24 Feb. 1916: 1st Bersaglieri Regiment disbanded and battalion became autonomous 28 May 1918: returned to Italy; 29 June 1918: entered 1st Group/1st Assault Div.
II Battalion	2nd Bersaglieri	Libya	Battalion fighting rebels in Libya since 15 Feb. 1915. Replaced in the regiment by the LIII battalion.
III Battalion	8th Bersaglieri	1915–18: Libya; 1918: Italian Front	Battalion fighting rebels in Libya until 28 May 1918; Replaced in the regiment by the XXXVIII battalion. 29 June 1918: battalion entered 4th Group/2nd Assault Div.
VII Battalion	1st Bersaglieri	1915–18: Libya; 1918: Italian Front	24 Feb. 1916: 1st Bersaglieri Regiment disbanded and battalion became autonomous 28 May 1918: returned to Italy; 29 June 1918: entered 2nd Group/1st Assault Div.
IX Battalion	1st Bersaglieri	1915–18: Libya; 1918: Italian Front	24 Feb. 1916: 1st Bersaglieri Regiment disbanded and battalion became autonomous 28 May 1918: returned to Italy; 29 June 1918: entered 3rd Group/1st Assault Div.
XI Battalion	7th Bersaglieri	Libya	Battalion fighting rebels in Libya since 11 Feb. 1915. Replaced in the regiment by the XLIV battalion.
XV Battalion	11th Bersaglieri	1915–18: Libya; 1918: Italian Front	Battalion fighting rebels in Libya from 4 Jan. 1915 until 28 May 1918; Replaced in the regiment by the XXXIX battalion. 29 June 1918: battalion entered 5th Group/2nd Assault Div.
XXII Battalion	5th Bersaglieri	Libya	Battalion fighting rebels in Libya since 15 Feb. 1915. Replaced in the regiment by the XLVI battalion.
XXVI Battalion	4th Bersaglieri	Rhodes	Battalions on garrison duty in Rhodes since 12 May 1912. Replaced in the regiment by the XLIII, respectively XXXVII battalion.
XXXI Battalion	4th Bersaglieri	Rhodes	Battalions on garrison duty in Rhodes since 12 May 1912. Replaced in the regiment by the XLIII, respectively XXXVII battalion.
LVII Battalion	16th Bersaglieri	Italian Front	7 March 1918: 16th Bersaglieri Regiment disbanded and its battalions became autonomous
LVIII Battalion	16th Bersaglieri	Italian Front	7 March 1918: 16th Bersaglieri Regiment disbanded and its battalions became autonomous
LXIII Battalion	16th Bersaglieri	Italian Front	7 March 1918: 16th Bersaglieri Regiment disbanded and its battalions became autonomous

=== Machine Gunner Companies ===
At the outbreak of the war each Royal Italian Army infantry and Bersaglieri battalion fielded one machine gun section with two Maxim 1911 machine guns, which were carried by horses. This proved quickly to be inadequate and in spring 1916 the army began to raise dedicated machine gunner companies (Compagnia Mitraglieri). These companies were attached to brigades, divisions and army corps, which deployed them with tactical units (regiments, battalions, companies) as needed. 2,277 Machine Gunner companies were raised and numbered continuously. The Bersaglieri depots raised 31 companies equipped with six St. Étienne Mle 1907 machine guns each, and the regimental depot of the 7th Bersaglieri Regiment in Brescia raised 84 companies equipped with six Fiat–Revelli Modello 1914 machine guns each.

=== Special Bersaglieri Division ===
At the outbreak of war seven Bersaglieri regiments were assigned to divisions or army corps, while four Bersaglieri regiments formed on 20 May 1915 the Special Bersaglieri Division (Divisione Speciale Bersaglieri). The four regiments were joined by IV Mountain Artillery Group ("Mondovì") of the 1st Mountain Artillery Regiment and minor support units. On 11 February 1916 the four regiments were grouped together in two brigades: the I Bersaglieri Brigade consisted of the 6th and 12th Bersaglieri regiments, while the II Bersaglieri Brigade consisted of the 9th and 11th Bersaglieri regiments. After not even a year of existence the division was transformed on 5 March 1916 into a standard infantry division, with the infantry Brigade "Piemonte" and Brigade "Aosta" replacing the Bersaglieri brigades, which afterwards were attached, like other Bersaglieri units, to divisions and army corps as needed.

Division	Regiment	Battalions	Notes
Special Bersaglieri Division (Divisione Speciale Bersaglieri)	6th Bersaglieri Regiment	VI Battalion; XIII Battalion; XIX Battalion	11 Feb. 1916: formed the I Bersaglieri Brigade with the 12th Bersaglieri Regiment
Special Bersaglieri Division (Divisione Speciale Bersaglieri)	9th Bersaglieri Regiment	XXVIII Battalion; XXX Battalion; XXXII Battalion	11 Feb. 1916: formed the II Bersaglieri Brigade
Special Bersaglieri Division (Divisione Speciale Bersaglieri)	11th Bersaglieri Regiment	XXVII Battalion; XXXIII Battalion; XXXIX Battalion	11 Feb. 1916: formed the II Bersaglieri Brigade
Special Bersaglieri Division (Divisione Speciale Bersaglieri)	12th Bersaglieri Regiment	XXI Battalion; XXIII Battalion; XXXVI Battalion	11 Feb. 1916: formed the I Bersaglieri Brigade with the 6th Bersaglieri Regiment
Special Bersaglieri Division (Divisione Speciale Bersaglieri)		IV Mountain Artillery Group	1st Mountain Artillery Regiment

=== Bersaglieri Brigades ===
After the Special Bersaglieri Division had been disbanded the two Bersaglieri brigades were attached to higher commands as needed. On 6 November 1916, the 7th Bersaglieri Regiment replaced the 9th Bersaglieri Regiment in the II Bersaglieri Brigade, but there were no further changes to the brigades during that year.

In 1917 the army decided to activate a further three Bersaglieri brigades of two regiments each, bringing the Bersaglieri closer in line with the regular infantry, all of whose regiments were grouped together in brigades composed of a headquarters and two infantry regiments. During the year the III, IV, and V Bersaglieri brigades were raised, with respectively the 17th and 18th, 14th and 20th, and 4th and 21st regiments belonging to their parent brigades. However the defeat in the Battle of Caporetto led to the destruction of the V Bersaglieri Brigade, which, together with the 21st Bersaglieri Regiment, was annihilated during the retreat from the Isonzo river to the Piave river.

In 1918 the army raised the V Bersaglieri Brigade again and also activated the VI and VII Bersaglieri brigades. The VI consisted of the 8th and 13th, respectively the 2nd and 3rd Bersaglieri regiments belonged to the VII Brigade. With this, all Bersaglieri regiments in Italy were now assigned to one of the seven Bersaglieri brigades.

Brigade	Regiment	Battalions	Notes
I Bersaglieri Brigade	6th Bersaglieri Regiment	VI Battalion; XIII Battalion; XIX Battalion	formed 11 Feb. 1916
I Bersaglieri Brigade	12th Bersaglieri Regiment	XXI Battalion; XXIII Battalion; XXXVI Battalion	formed 11 Feb. 1916
II Bersaglieri Brigade	7th Bersaglieri Regiment	VIII Battalion; X Battalion; XLIV Battalion	formed 11 Feb. 1916 with the 9th and 11th Bersaglieri regiments 9th Regiment replaced by the 7th Regiment on 6 Nov. 1916
II Bersaglieri Brigade	11th Bersaglieri Regiment	XXVII Battalion; XXXIII Battalion; XXXIX Battalion	formed 11 Feb. 1916 with the 9th and 11th Bersaglieri regiments 9th Regiment replaced by the 7th Regiment on 6 Nov. 1916
III Bersaglieri Brigade	17th Bersaglieri Regiment	LXIV Battalion; LXV Battalion; LXVI Battalion	formed 18 March 1917
III Bersaglieri Brigade	18th Bersaglieri Regiment	LXVII Battalion; LXVIII Battalion; LXIX Battalion	formed 18 March 1917
IV Bersaglieri Brigade	14th Bersaglieri Regiment	XL Battalion; LIV Battalion; LXI Battalion	formed 1 April 1917
IV Bersaglieri Brigade	20th Bersaglieri Regiment	LXX Battalion; LXXI Battalion; LXXII Battalion	formed 1 April 1917
V Bersaglieri Brigade (1st formation)	4th Bersaglieri Regiment	XXIX Battalion; XXXVII Battalion; XLIII Battalion	formed 18 June 1917 destroyed 7 Nov. 1917
V Bersaglieri Brigade (1st formation)	21st Bersaglieri Regiment	LXXIII Battalion; LXXIV Battalion; LXXV Battalion	formed 18 June 1917 destroyed 7 Nov. 1917
V Bersaglieri Brigade (2nd formation)	5th Bersaglieri Regiment	XIV Battalion; XXIV Battalion; XLVI Battalion	formed 1 March 1918
V Bersaglieri Brigade (2nd formation)	19th Bersaglieri Regiment	XLI Battalion; XLII Battalion; XLV Battalion	formed 1 March 1918
VI Bersaglieri Brigade	8th Bersaglieri Regiment	V Battalion; XII Battalion; XXXVIII Battalion	formed 1 June 1918
VI Bersaglieri Brigade	13th Bersaglieri Regiment	LIX Battalion; LX Battalion; LXII Battalion	formed 1 June 1918
VII Bersaglieri Brigade	2nd Bersaglieri Regiment	IV Battalion; XVII Battalion; LIII Battalion	formed 29 August 1918
VII Bersaglieri Brigade	3rd Bersaglieri Regiment	XVIII Battalion; XX Battalion; XXV Battalion	formed 29 August 1918

=== Assault Divisions ===
At the end of 1915 each infantry regiment the Italian Army began to create Arditi platoons modeled after the German Stormtroopers. These units remained a regimental asset until 1917 when the 2nd Army on its own initiative an Arditi school in Sdricca di Manzano. The first unit raised from volunteers was officially activated with a live-fire exercise in front of King Victor Emmanuel III on 29 July 1917. Named I Assault Battalion (I Reparto d'Assalto) the successful exercise led to the creation of a second battalion, with both units having their baptism of fire during the Eleventh Battle of the Isonzo on the Banjšice Plateau.

After the success of the Arditi during the Eleventh Battle of the Isonzo all armies were ordered to raise Arditi battalions. However each army raised and employed these battalions in different ways and only after the disastrous Battle of Caporetto did the Italian High Command take control of the formation and use of the Arditi units. Each army corps was to receive an Assault Battalion organized into a battalion HQ, three Arditi companies, three machine gun sections, six machine pistol section, and six flamethrower sections. The Bersaglieri raised three Assault battalions with similar composition.

On 10 June 1918 the 1st Assault Division was created with three regiment-sized groupings of three Arditi battalions each with assigned HQ. On 25 June 1918 the 2nd Assault Division was raised and the two divisions thus formed the Assault Army Corps (Corpo d'Armata d'Assalto). Each division consisted of three groupings with two assault battalions and a Bersaglieri battalion, with an attached group HQ. Additionally each division fielded one Bersaglieri cyclists battalion, a cavalry squadron, a mountain artillery group, a sapper battalion, and various support units. The six Bersaglieri battalions in the groupings had been deployed to Libya until 28 May 1918. Additionally the corps fielded the Cyclists Assault Battalion formed on 24 June 1918 from the remaining men of the II, VI, IX, and X cyclists battalions.

The corps's two divisions had the following structure:

Division	Group	Battalion	Notes
1st Assault Division (1^{a} Divisione d'Assalto)	1st Group	X Assault Battalion	
1st Assault Division (1^{a} Divisione d'Assalto)	1st Group	XX Assault Battalion	
1st Assault Division (1^{a} Divisione d'Assalto)	1st Group	I Bersaglieri Battalion	1st Bersaglieri Regiment
1st Assault Division (1^{a} Divisione d'Assalto)	2nd Group	XII Assault Battalion	
1st Assault Division (1^{a} Divisione d'Assalto)	2nd Group	XIII Assault Battalion	
1st Assault Division (1^{a} Divisione d'Assalto)	2nd Group	VII Bersaglieri Battalion	1st Bersaglieri Regiment
1st Assault Division (1^{a} Divisione d'Assalto)	3rd Group	VIII Assault Battalion	
1st Assault Division (1^{a} Divisione d'Assalto)	3rd Group	XX Assault Battalion	
1st Assault Division (1^{a} Divisione d'Assalto)	3rd Group	IX Bersaglieri Battalion	1st Bersaglieri Regiment
1st Assault Division (1^{a} Divisione d'Assalto)		III Cyclists Battalion	3rd Bersaglieri Regiment
1st Assault Division (1^{a} Divisione d'Assalto)		5th Cavalry Squadron	Cavalry Rgt. Piacenza (18th)
1st Assault Division (1^{a} Divisione d'Assalto)		IX Mountain Artillery Group	3rd Mountain Artillery Regiment
1st Assault Division (1^{a} Divisione d'Assalto)		XCI Sapper Battalion	
2nd Assault Division (2^{a} Divisione d'Assalto)	4th Group	XIV Assault Battalion	
2nd Assault Division (2^{a} Divisione d'Assalto)	4th Group	XXV Assault Battalion	
2nd Assault Division (2^{a} Divisione d'Assalto)	4th Group	III Bersaglieri Battalion	8th Bersaglieri Regiment
2nd Assault Division (2^{a} Divisione d'Assalto)	5th Group	I Assault Battalion	
2nd Assault Division (2^{a} Divisione d'Assalto)	5th Group	V Assault Battalion	
2nd Assault Division (2^{a} Divisione d'Assalto)	5th Group	XV Bersaglieri Battalion	11th Bersaglieri Regiment
2nd Assault Division (2^{a} Divisione d'Assalto)	6th Group	VI Assault Battalion	
2nd Assault Division (2^{a} Divisione d'Assalto)	6th Group	XXX Assault Battalion	
2nd Assault Division (2^{a} Divisione d'Assalto)	6th Group	LV Bersaglieri Battalion	Autonomous Battalion
2nd Assault Division (2^{a} Divisione d'Assalto)		XI Cyclists Battalion	11th Bersaglieri Regiment
2nd Assault Division (2^{a} Divisione d'Assalto)		6th Cavalry Squadron	Cavalry Rgt. Piacenza (18th)
2nd Assault Division (2^{a} Divisione d'Assalto)		XII Mountain Artillery Group	3rd Mountain Artillery Regiment
2nd Assault Division (2^{a} Divisione d'Assalto)		Sapper Battalion	

=== Geographical Distribution ===
In 1914 the 1st Bersaglieri Regiment moved its depot from Sanremo to Naples to be closer to its upcoming area of deployment in Libya, while the 5th Bersaglieri Regiment moved from Ancona into the vacant barracks located at Sanremo and the 11th Bersaglieri Regiment moved from Naples to Ancona.

Bersaglieri Regiments 1914

== Interwar years ==
After the war the nine wartime regiments were disbanded and the number of Bersaglieri battalions in the remaining regiments reduced to two per regiment. A new role was seen for the light infantry as part of Italy's commitment to Mobile Warfare. The post-war Bersaglieri were converted into bicycle troops to fight alongside cavalry in the Celeri (fast) divisions. Elite units with high morale and an aggressive spirit were seen as one way to break such tactical stalemates as the trench warfare of 1915–18. The Bersaglieri gave Italy highly trained formations suitable for service with both cavalry and tanks. When the armoured divisions were formed in 1939, the link between the Bersaglieri and mobile warfare continued. Each new armoured and motorised division was allocated one Bersaglieri regiment.

== Interwar period ==
A single Bersaglieri regiment, the 3rd Bersaglieri, took part in the Second Italo-Ethiopian War in October 1935, invading from Eritrea as part of the 30th Infantry Division Sabauda under General Italo Gariboldi. There, they took part in the Christmas Offensive and the Battle of Amba Aradam, among others. The regiment was detached and sent back to Asmara in March 1936 to join a new unit, the East Africa Fast Column under Achille Starace.

== World War II ==
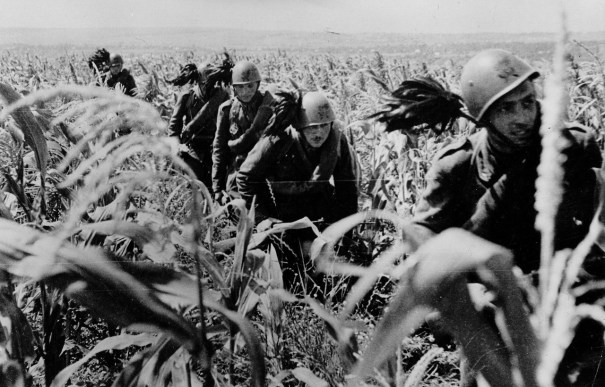
Bersaglieri in Ukraine in 1941

Italy began the Second World War with twelve Bersaglieri regiments of three battalions each. Over the preceding years the Army had resisted suggestions to dilute the regiment's quality, and recruits continued to be of above-average size and stamina, endured intense physical training and had to qualify as marksmen. During the war an additional Bersaglieri regiment, the 18th, with three battalions was raised, but only one of its battalions saw combat.

- 1st Bersaglieri Regiment (I, VII, IX battalions) – initially III Army Corps; from March 1942: 2nd Cavalry Division "Emanuele Filiberto Testa di Ferro"
- 2nd Bersaglieri Regiment (II, IV, XVII battalions) – garrison unit in Euboea (Greece)
- 3rd Bersaglieri Regiment (XVIII, XX, XXV battalions) – 3rd Cavalry Division "Principe Amedeo Duca d'Aosta"; served on the Eastern Front
- 4th Bersaglieri Regiment (XXVI, XXIX, XXXI battalions) – garrison unit in Split (Yugoslavia)
- 5th Bersaglieri Regiment (XIV, XXII, XXIV battalions) – 131st Armored Division "Centauro"; destroyed in the Tunisian campaign
- 6th Bersaglieri Regiment (VI, XIII, XIX battalions) – 2nd Cavalry Division "Emanuele Filiberto Testa di Ferro"; from March 1942: 3rd Cavalry Division "Principe Amedeo Duca d'Aosta" on the Eastern Front
- 7th Bersaglieri Regiment (VIII, X, XI battalions) – 102nd Motorized Division "Trento"; destroyed in the Tunisian campaign
- 8th Bersaglieri Regiment (III, V, XII battalions) – 132nd Armored Division "Ariete"; destroyed in the Tunisian campaign; reformed in July 1943
- 9th Bersaglieri Regiment (XXVIII, XXX, XXXII battalions) – 101st Motorized Division "Trieste"; destroyed in the Second Battle of El Alamein
- 10th Bersaglieri Regiment (XVI, XXXIV, XXXV battalions) – German Division von Broich/von Manteuffel; destroyed in the Tunisian campaign
- 11th Bersaglieri Regiment (XV, XXVII, XXXIII battalions) – 1st Cavalry Division "Eugenio di Savoia"; from early 1942 attached to the 158th Infantry Division "Zara"
- 12th Bersaglieri Regiment (XXI, XXIII, XXXVI battalions) – 133rd Armored Division "Littorio"; destroyed in the Second Battle of El Alamein
- 18th Bersaglieri Armored Reconnaissance Regiment (LXVII, LXVIII, LXIX battalions) – garrison unit in the South of France; in spring 1942 the LXVII battalion was sent to the Eastern Front; remaining regiment joined the 136th Armored Legionary Division "Centauro" on 9 September 1943 in Rome

The Bersaglieri fought in the Italian invasion of France and in the Greco-Italian War, later Bersaglieri regiments were deployed on the Eastern Front. One battalion of Bersaglieri participated in the East African Campaign. Six Bersaglieri regiments served and were destroyed during the North African Campaign.

After the Armistice of Cassibile between the Kingdom of Italy and Western Allies on 8 September 1943, Italy split in half. The Republic of Salò continued the war alongside Nazi Germany. Its Army, the fascist National Republican Army, raised the 1st Bersaglieri Division "Italia", which was attached to the German 14th Army in a sector on the Northern Apennines. The division fought along the Gothic Line, and at the end of the final allied offensive, along with two Wehrmacht and the last fascist divisions, surrendered after the Battle of Collecchio.

On the other side of the front the Italian Co-belligerent Army raised a Bersaglieri battalion as part of the Combat Group "Legnano" from remnants of the 4th Bersaglieri Regiment.

== Cold War ==
During the Cold War the Bersaglieri were exclusively employed as mechanized infantry. The three active Bersaglieri regiments were assigned to the Army's armored divisions, with the 3rd and 8th regiments fielding two Bersaglieri and one tank battalion, while the 1st Armored Bersaglieri Regiment fielded two tank and one Bersaglieri battalion. Additionally each of the three active tank regiments fielded one Bersaglieri and two tank battalions, while the four armored infantry regiments of the motorized divisions fielded one Bersaglieri and one tank battalion each. Without exception the Bersaglieri battalions were armed with M113 armored personnel carriers.

At the end of 1974 the following Bersaglieri regiments were active:

- 1st Armored Bersaglieri Regiment, in Civitavecchia
  - Command and Services Company
  - I Bersaglieri Battalion
- 3rd Bersaglieri Regiment, in Milan
  - Command and Services Company
  - XVIII Bersaglieri Battalion
  - XXV Bersaglieri Battalion, in Solbiate Olona
- 8th Bersaglieri Regiment, in Pordenone
  - Command and Services Company
  - III Bersaglieri Battalion
  - XII Bersaglieri Battalion

At the end of 1974 the following tank regiments fielded one Bersaglieri battalion:

- 31st Tank Regiment, in Bellinzago Novarese
  - XXVIII Bersaglieri Battalion
- 32nd Tank Regiment, in Tauriano
  - XXIII Bersaglieri Battalion
- 132nd Tank Regiment, in Aviano
  - XXXVIII Bersaglieri Battalion

Together the three Bersaglieri and three tank regiments formed the army's two armored divisions:

- Armored Division "Centauro" – 1st Armored Bersaglieri, 3rd Bersaglieri, and 31st Tank Regiment
- Armored Division "Ariete" – 8th Bersaglieri, 32nd Tank, and 132nd Tank Regiment

The remaining four active Bersaglieri battalions were assigned to the army's four armored infantry regiments:

- 3rd Armored Infantry Regiment, in Persano (Infantry Division "Granatieri di Sardegna")
  - IV Bersaglieri Battalion
- 4th Armored Infantry Regiment, in Legnano (Infantry Division "Legnano")
  - II Bersaglieri Battalion
- 22nd Armored Infantry Regiment "Cremona", in Turin (Infantry Division "Cremona")
  - VI Bersaglieri Battalion
- 182nd Armored Infantry Regiment "Garibaldi", in Sacile (Infantry Division "Folgore")
  - XI Bersaglieri Battalion

=== 1975 army reform ===
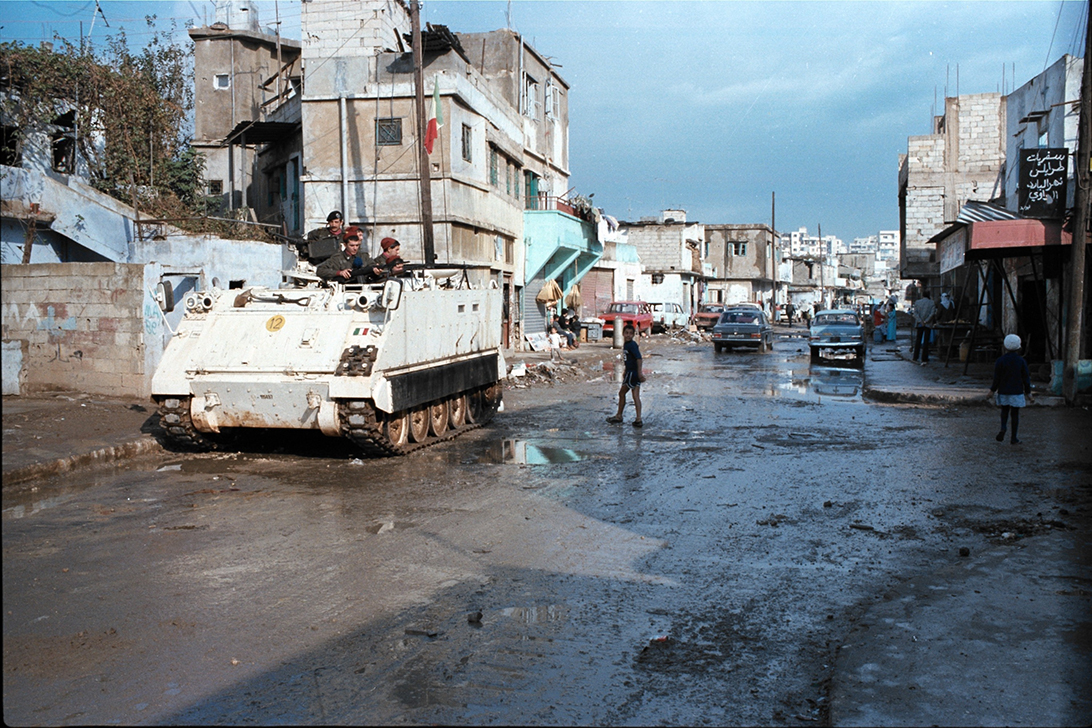
Soldiers of the 2nd Bersaglieri Battalion "Governolo" on patrol with the Multinational Force in Lebanon in 1982

During the Italian Army reform of 1975 the regimental level was abolished and battalions became independent units under newly formed brigades. The Army formed the 3rd Mechanized Brigade "Goito" with the regimental command and units of the 3rd Bersaglieri Regiment and the 8th Mechanized Brigade "Garibaldi" with the regimental command and units of the 8th Bersaglieri Regiment. Both brigades received one extra Bersaglieri battalion from disbanded armored infantry regiments and both fielded only personnel – with the exception of the tank crews and artillerists – from the Bersaglieri corps.

When the battalions became independent they received the flags and traditions of disbanded Bersaglieri regiments and each battalion was given an honorary name commemorating a significant event in which it had participated: e.g. the 3rd Bersaglieri Battalion "Cernaia" received its honorary name to commemorate the conduct of the battalion during the Battle of the Chernaya in Crimea during the Crimean War in 1855. In the following list of Bersaglieri units active in 1977.

- 1st Bersaglieri Battalion "La Marmora", in Civitavecchia (Mechanized Brigade "Granatieri di Sardegna")
- 2nd Bersaglieri Battalion "Governolo", in Legnano (Mechanized Brigade "Legnano")
- 3rd Bersaglieri Battalion "Cernaia", in Pordenone (8th Mechanized Brigade "Garibaldi")
- 6th Bersaglieri Battalion "Palestro", in Turin (3rd Mechanized Brigade "Goito")
- 10th Bersaglieri Battalion "Bezzecca", in Solbiate Olona (3rd Mechanized Brigade "Goito")
- 11th Bersaglieri Battalion "Caprera", in Orcenico Superiore (8th Mechanized Brigade "Garibaldi")
- 14th Bersaglieri (Recruits Training) Battalion "Sernaglia", in Albenga (3rd Army Corps)
- 18th Bersaglieri Battalion "Poggio Scanno", in Milan (3rd Mechanized Brigade "Goito")
- 23rd Bersaglieri Battalion "Castel di Borgo", in Tauriano (32nd Armored Brigade "Mameli")
- 26th Bersaglieri Battalion "Castelfidardo", in Maniago (8th Mechanized Brigade "Garibaldi")
- 27th Bersaglieri Battalion "Jamiano", in Aviano (132nd Armored Brigade "Manin")
- 28th Bersaglieri Battalion "Oslavia", in Bellinzago Novarese (31st Armored Brigade "Curtatone")
- 67th Bersaglieri Battalion "Fagare", in Persano (Mechanized Brigade "Pinerolo")

Additionally the Bersaglieri fielded five anti-tank companies, one per Bersaglieri and one per Armored Brigade (Armored brigades Armored Brigade "Manin", Armored Brigade "Centauro", and Armored Brigade "Mameli").

With the end of the Cold War, the Italian army began a reduction in personnel and units which also affected the Bersaglieri. On 1 June 1991 the Mechanized Brigade "Goito" was disbanded, while the Mechanized Brigade "Garibaldi" moved to the Southern city of Caserta, as the Army had decided to reduce the number of units in the north of Italy. The Garibaldi arrived in Caserta on 1 July 1991 and changed its name to 8th Bersaglieri Brigade "Garibaldi". Also in 1991, the battalions of the Army were renamed as regiments without changing composition.

== Current structure ==
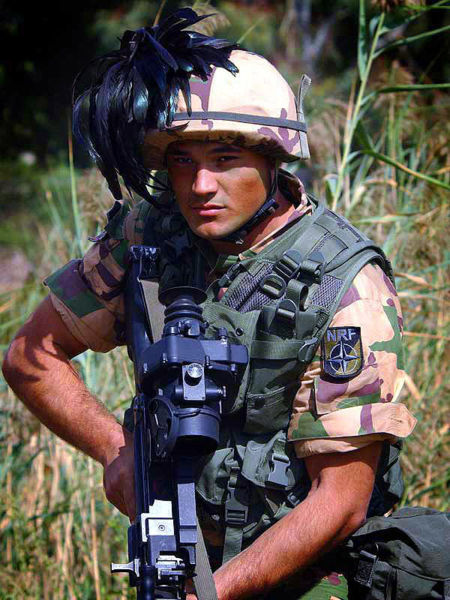
A Bersagliere of the NATO Response Force in 2008

Bersaglieri on an FTX in Romania with Dardo IFVs in May 2021

While in the past the mobility of the Bersaglieri manifested itself in running and the use of bicycles, regiments currently in service are all mechanised with either Dardo or Freccia infantry fighting vehicles. To distinguish them from other infantry units the Bersaglieri collar patches are crimson-red and enlisted troops wear a red fez instead of berets. Officers wear black berets with their standard uniform, but a feathered "vaira" when dressed in ceremonial uniform. They also wear black gloves, while other Italian regiments wear white ones. Originally each Bersaglieri regiment had a band called a "fanfara", who played their instruments at the double while on parade. Today only the Garibaldi Brigade, 6th and 7th Bersaglieri Regiment retain a "fanfara", which are technically brass bands.

Since 1982 Bersaglieri have served as peacekeepers with the Multinational Force in Lebanon, and during the Yugoslav and Somali Civil Wars. Bersaglier units also served in Operation Iraqi Freedom and were repeatedly deployed to serve in the war in Afghanistan. As of 2019 the following Bersaglieri units are in active service:

- 1st Bersaglieri Regiment, in Cosenza as part of the Bersaglieri Brigade "Garibaldi")
  - 1st Battalion "La Marmora" (Dardo IFV)
- 3rd Bersaglieri Regiment, in Teulada (Mechanized Brigade "Sassari")
  - 18th Battalion "Poggio Scanno" (Freccia IFV)
- 4th Bersaglieri Command and Tactical Supports Unit, in Caserta (Bersaglieri Brigade "Garibaldi")
- 6th Bersaglieri Regiment, in Trapani (Mechanized Brigade "Aosta")
  - 6th Battalion "Palestro" (Freccia IFV)
- 7th Bersaglieri Regiment, in Altamura (Mechanized Brigade "Pinerolo")
  - 10th Battalion "Bezzecca" (Freccia IFV)
- 8th Bersaglieri Regiment, in Caserta (Bersaglieri Brigade "Garibaldi")
  - 3rd Battalion "Cernaia" (Dardo IFV)
- 11th Bersaglieri Regiment, in Orcenico Superiore (132nd Armored Brigade "Ariete")
  - 11th Battalion "Caprera" (Dardo IFV)
- 2nd Bersaglieri Company "Pantere", in Teulada (part of the 1st Armored Regiment)
- 3rd Bersaglieri Company "Celere", in Solbiate Olona (part of the Tactical and Logistic Support Regiment of the NRDC-ITA Support Brigade)

== Bugle calls ==
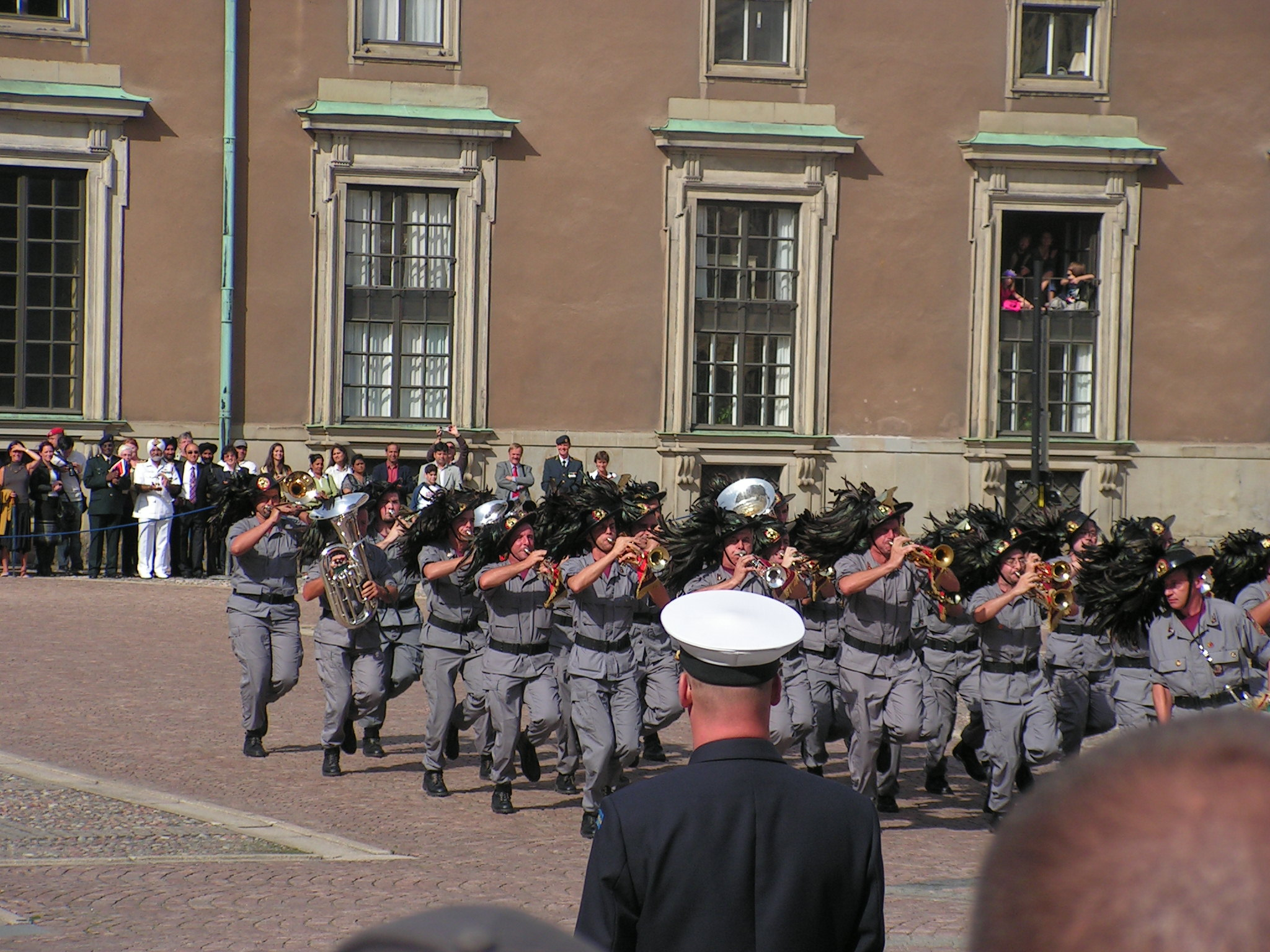
The Bersaglieri Bugles during a Tattoo in 2006

In mid-1800 the Bersaglieri were born as light infantry sharpshooters fighting in loose skirmish formations, and specific bugle calls were used to direct the units in the confusion of the battlefield. Each battalion had its own specific bugle call played repeatedly to rally the troops or used as a sort of "address" before tactical bugle calls, to identify who the order was intended for (for example, a composite bugle call could be "1st Bersaglieri" + "Company" + "Right/Nr.3" + "Deploy in open order").

Regimental Bugle Calls	Tactical Bugle Calls	
1st Bersaglieri Regiment	Affirmative/Yes	Charge
2nd Bersaglieri Regiment	Negative/Not	Defend lively
3rd Bersaglieri Regiment	Question/Repeat	Defend from cavalry
4th Bersaglieri Regiment	Wing	Open fire
5th Bersaglieri Regiment	Companies	Stop firing
6th Bersaglieri Regiment	Supports	Normal step
7th Bersaglieri Regiment	Right(or Nr.1)	Quick step
8th Bersaglieri Regiment	Left (or Nr.2)	Running step
9th Bersaglieri Regiment	Center (or Nr.3)	Stop at the mark
10th Bersaglieri Regiment	Deploy in open order	Backpacks to the ground
11th Bersaglieri Regiment	Deploy in closed order	Alternate skirmish lines
12th Bersaglieri Regiment	Deploy in successive lines	Retreat
18th Bersaglieri Regiment	Double spacing	Attention
	Half spacing	Ask reinforcements
	Regroup	

== See also ==
- Italian Bersaglieri Bands
