= Kamno =

Kamno may refer to:

- Kamno, Slovenia, a village in Slovenia
- Kamno, Russia, a rural locality (a village) in Pskovsky District of Pskov Oblast, Russia
