= 9th Bersaglieri Regiment =

Inactive Italian Army infantry unit

- 9° Reggimento Bersaglieri
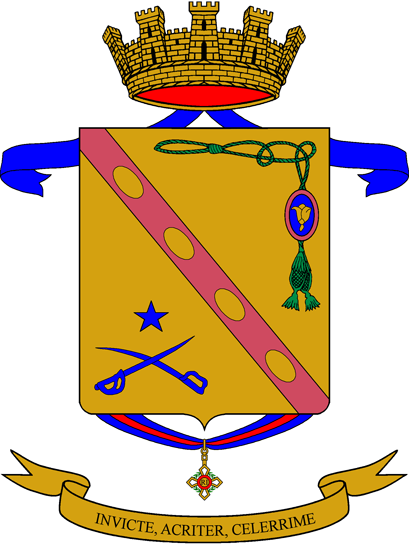
- Regimental coat of arms
- Active: 1 Jan. 1871 — 28 Nov. 1917; 20 Feb. 1919 — 5 Nov. 1942; 21 Oct. 1975 — 15 Oct. 1996
- Country: Italy
- Branch: Italian Army
- Part of: Armored Brigade "Centauro"
- Garrison/HQ: Bellinzago Novarese
- Mottos: "Invicte, acriter, celerrime"
- Anniversaries: 18 June 1836
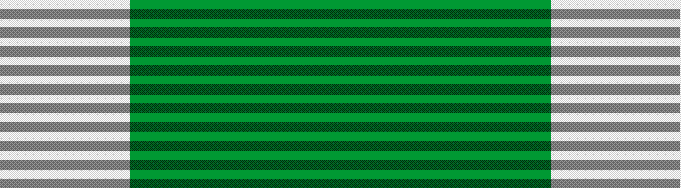
- Decorations: 1x Military Order of Italy; 2x Bronze Medals of Military Valor; 1x Silver Medal of Merit

Insignia
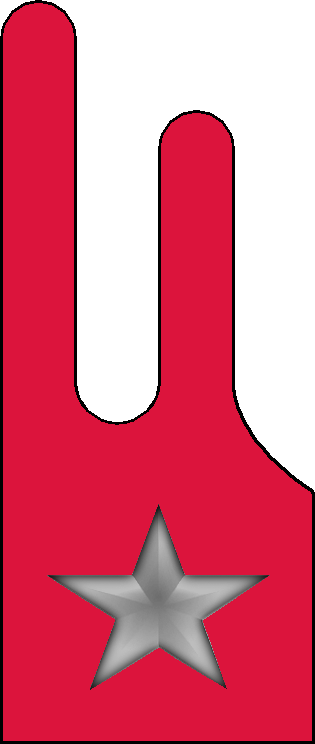
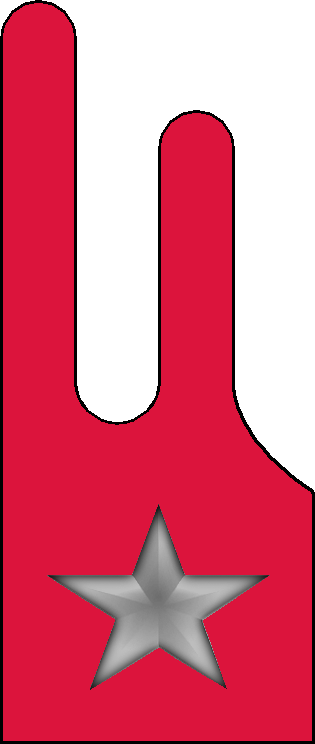
- Bersaglieri gorget patches

The 9th Bersaglieri Regiment (Italian: 9° Reggimento Bersaglieri) is an inactive unit of the Italian Army last based in Bellinzago Novarese in Lombardy. The regiment is part of the Italian Army's infantry corps' Bersaglieri speciality and was last operationally assigned to the Armored Brigade "Centauro". The regiment was formed in 1871 by the Royal Italian Army with preexisting battalions. During World War I the regiment served on the Italian front. After the disastrous Battle of Caporetto the regiment was disbanded on 28 November 1917 due to the heavy losses it had suffered.

The regiment was reformed on 20 February 1919. During World War II the regiment fought in the Western Desert campaign in North Africa, where it was destroyed during the Second Battle of El Alamein. In 1976 the regiment's flag and traditions were assigned to the 28th Bersaglieri Battalion "Oslavia", which had become an autonomous unit on 21 October 1975. The regiment's anniversary falls, as for all Bersaglieri units, on 18 June 1836, the day the Bersaglieri speciality was founded.

== History ==
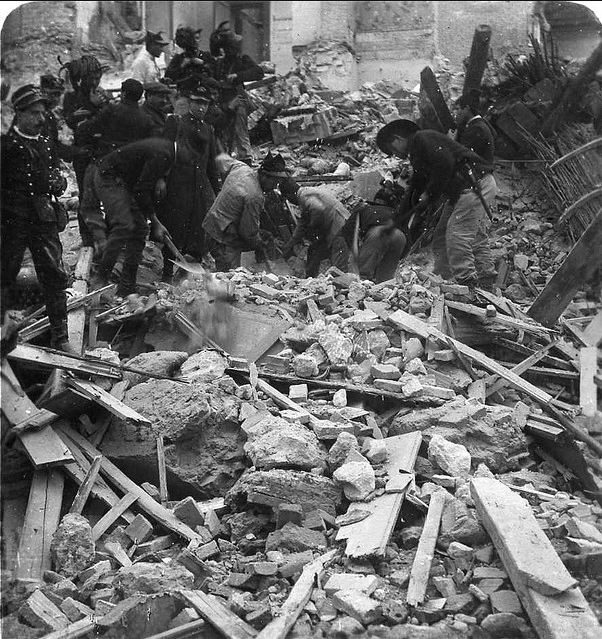
Bersaglieri search for survivors after the 1908 Messina earthquake

On 1 January 1871 the 9th Bersaglieri Regiment was formed in Bari with the XXVIII Battalion, XXX Battalion, XXXII Battalion, and XL Battalion, which were transferred from the 4th Bersaglieri Regiment. The four battalions were renumbered as I, II, III, and IV battalion upon entering the new regiment. On 16 September 1883 the IV Battalion was disbanded. On 18 June 1886, all Bersaglieri battalions resumed their original numbering and afterwards the 9th Bersaglieri Regiment consisted of the XXVIII Battalion, XXX Battalion, and XXXII Battalion.

These three battalions had been formed in 1861, while the XL Battalion had been formed in 1865. All four battalions fought in the Third Italian War of Independence in 1866. On 7 January 1869 the XXVIII Battalion crushed a peasants revolt in San Giovanni in Persiceto, for which the battalion was awarded a Bronze Medal of Military Valor. When the battalion joined the 9th Bersaglieri Regiment the medal was affixed to the regiment's flag and added to the regiment's coat of arms. In September 1870 the XXVIII Battalion and XL Battalion participated in the capture of Rome.

In 1895-96 the regiment provided 13 officers and 298 troops to help form the I, II, IV, and V provisional battalions, which were deployed to Eritrea for the First Italo-Ethiopian War. In December 1908 the XXX Battalion was deployed to the area of the Strait of Messina for the recovery efforts after the 1908 Messina earthquake. For its service the battalion was awarded a Silver Medal of Merit, which was affixed to the flag of the 9th Bersaglieri Regiment. On 1 October 1910 the regiment's depot in Asti formed the IX Cyclists Battalion. In 1911, the XXVIII Battalion deployed to Libya for the Italo-Turkish War.

=== World War I ===
At the outbreak of World War I the regiment consisted of the XXVIII, XXX, and XXXII battalions and the IX Cyclists Battalion, which operated as an autonomous unit throughout the war. On 20 May 1915, three days before Italy entered the war, the regiment formed, together with the 6th Bersaglieri Regiment, 11th Bersaglieri Regiment, and 12th Bersaglieri Regiment the Special Bersaglieri Division, which also included the IV Mountain Artillery Group of the 1st Mountain Artillery Regiment and minor support units. In July 1915 the division fought in the First Battle of the Isonzo on the Karst plateau at Monte San Michele, in August of the same year in the Second Battle of the Isonzo in the area of Bovec, and in September on the slopes of Monte Javoršček. In November 1915 the divisions fought in the Third Battle of the Isonzo, with the 9th Bersaglieri Regiment deployed at Oslavia. On 11 February 1916 the four regiments were grouped together in two brigades: the I Bersaglieri Brigade consisted of the 6th and 12th Bersaglieri regiments, while the II Bersaglieri Brigade consisted of the 9th and 11th Bersaglieri regiments. After not even a year of existence the division was reorganized on 5 March 1916 as a standard infantry division, with the Brigade "Piemonte" and Brigade "Aosta" replacing the two Bersaglieri brigades, which afterwards were attached, like other Bersaglieri units, to divisions and army corps as needed.

In July 1916 the regiment was deployed on Monte Zebio and Monte Colombara. In August of the same year the II Bersaglieri Brigade fought in the Sixth Battle of the Isonzo and Seventh Battle of the Isonzo. On 6 November 1916 the 7th Bersaglieri Regiment replaced the 9th Bersaglieri Regiment, which for the rest of the war was attached to infantry divisions as needed. From 24 to 31 May 1917 the regiment fought in the Tenth Battle of the Isonzo on Monte Ermada. One month later the regiment was on Monte Ortigara for the Battle of Mount Ortigara. In October 1917 the regiment was sent to Caporetto to help stem the Austro-Hungarian Caporetto Offensive. Over the next days the regiment was forced to retreat with the remnants of the Italian armies over the Tagliamento river and then the Piave river. On 17 November 1917 the regiment's remaining troops were transferred to the 4th Bersaglieri Regiment to bring that regiment back up to strength. On 28 November 1917 the 9th Bersaglieri Regiment was disbanded due to the heavy losses it had suffered during the retreat.

Throughout the war the IX Cyclists Battalion fought as an autonomous unit. In June 1918 the battalion fought in the Second Battle of the Piave River, during which the battalion suffered heavy losses. On 24 June 1918 the II, VI, IX, and X Cyclists battalions were disbanded and their remaining personnel merged into a single Cyclists Assault Battalion. In 1915 the 9th Bersaglieri Regiment's depot in Asti formed the XLIII Battalion, which was assigned to the 4th Bersaglieri Regiment, as two of the latter regiment's battalions were on occupation duty on the island of Rhodes in the Aegean Sea since 1912. The same year the depot formed the LIX Battalion, which on 22 November 1915 entered the newly formed 13th Bersaglieri Regiment.

=== Interwar years ===
The 9th Bersaglieri Regiment was reformed on 20 February 1919 by renaming the 20th Bersaglieri Regiment, whose LXX, LXXI, and LXXII battalions were renumbered XXVIII, XXX, and XXXII. In 1920 the XXXII Battalion was reduced to a reserve unit. In July 1924 the regiment became a cyclists unit. In 1929 the regiment moved from Asti to Zadar on the Dalmatian Coast. In 1930 the XXX Battalion was reorganized as a machine gunners battalion. On 15 March 1931 the XXXII Battalion was reformed as a machine gunners battalion. In 1935-36 the regiment provided 162 troops to the 3rd Bersaglieri Regiment, which was deployed to Italian Eritrea for the Second Italo-Ethiopian War.

On 10 August 1936 the regiment was reorganized as a motorized unit and now consisted of the XXVIII Cyclists Battalion, XXX Auto-transported Battalion, and XXXII Motorcycle Machine Gunners Battalion. The same year the regiment moved from Zadar to Tarvisio, but already a year later, in 1937, the regiment moved to Treviso. On 1 April 1939 the 9th Bersaglieri Regiment was assigned to the 101st Motorized Division "Trieste", which also included the 65th Infantry Regiment "Trieste", 66th Infantry Regiment "Trieste", and 21st Artillery Regiment "Trieste". On 7 April 1939 the regimental command and XXVIII Cyclists Battalion participated in the Invasion of Albania. On 11 July 1939 the XXVIII Cyclists Battalion was disbanded.

=== World War II ===
On 11 April 1940 the regiment received the XL Auto-transported Battalion, the 105th Cannons Company, which was equipped with 47/32 mod. 35 anti-tank guns, and an Auto Unit. In June 1940 the regiment participated in the Invasion of France. Afterwards the regiment moved from Treviso to Cremona. On 3 November 1940 the XL Auto-transported Battalion was renumbered as XXVIII Auto-transported Battalion. On 10 November the regiment consisted of the following units:

- 9th Bersaglieri Regiment
  - Command Company
  - XXVIII Auto-transported Battalion
  - XXX Auto-transported Battalion
  - XXXII Motorcyclists Battalion
  - 105th Cannons Company, with 47/32 mod. 35 anti-tank guns
  - Transport Unit

In September 1941 the 101st Motorized Division "Trieste" was sent to Libya for the Western Desert campaign. After its arrival the division was immediately employed in the Siege of Tobruk covering the besieging forces right flank. On 18 November 1941 the British Eighth Army launched Operation Crusader to relieve the siege of Tobruk. On 6 December the Axis forces received the order to retreat westwards and the Trieste formed the rearguard and fought delaying battles at Bir Bellafaa, Sidi Breghish, Alem Hamza, and Suluq. After reorganizing at El Agheila the German-Italian Panzer Group Africa counterattacked on 21 January 1942 and drove British forces back to Ain el Gazala. For its conduct in these battles the regiment was awarded a Bronze Medal of Military Valor, which was affixed to the regiment's flag and added to the regiment's coat of arms.

On 29 March 1942 the regiment was transferred from the 101st Motorized Division "Trieste" to direct control of the X Army Corps. In May 1942 the regiment fought in the Battle of Gazala, and then in June in the Battle of Mersa Matruh. In July the regiment fought in the First Battle of El Alamein, followed in August by the Battle of Alam el Halfa. On 23 October 1942 the British Eighth Army commenced the Second Battle of El Alamein, during which the 9th Bersaglieri Regiment was surrounded and destroyed by British forces on 5 November.

=== Cold War ===
On 1 November 1963 the XXVIII Bersaglieri Battalion was reformed as a mechanized unit by renaming the XX as Bersaglieri Battalion of the 31st Tank Regiment. During the 1975 army reform the army disbanded the regimental level and newly independent battalions were granted for the first time their own flags. On 20 October 1975 the 31st Tank Regiment was disbanded and the next day the regiment's XXVIII Bersaglieri Battalion in Bellinzago Novarese became an autonomous unit and was renamed 28th Bersaglieri Battalion "Oslavia". The battalion was named for Oslavia, where the 9th Bersaglieri Regiment had fought during the Third Battle of the Isonzo. The battalion was assigned to the 31st Armored Brigade "Curtatone" and consisted of a command, a command and services company, three mechanized companies with M113 armored personnel carriers, and a heavy mortar company with M106 mortar carriers with 120mm Mod. 63 mortars. The battalion fielded now 896 men (45 officers, 100 non-commissioned officers, and 751 soldiers).

On 12 November 1976 the President of the Italian Republic Giovanni Leone assigned with decree 846 the flag and traditions of the 9th Bersaglieri Regiment to the battalion. In 1986 the Italian Army abolished the divisional level and brigades, which until then had been under one of the Army's four divisions, came forthwith under direct command of the Army's 3rd Army Corps or 5th Army Corps. As the Armored Division "Centauro" carried a historically significant name, the division ceased to exist on 31 October in Novara, and the next day in the same location the 31st Armored Brigade "Centauro" was activated. The new brigade took command of the units of the 31st Armored Brigade "Curtatone", whose name was stricken from the roll of active units of the Italian Army.

=== Recent times ===
On 15 October 1996 the 28th Bersaglieri Battalion "Oslavia" was disbanded and on 18 October the flag of the 9th Bersaglieri Regiment was transferred to the Shrine of the Flags in the Vittoriano in Rome.

== See also ==
- Bersaglieri
