= 18th Bersaglieri Regiment =

Inactive Italian Army infantry unit

- 18° Reggimento bersaglieri
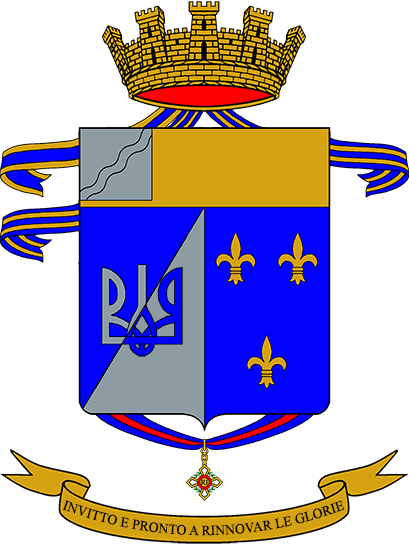
- Regimental coat of arms
- Active: 31 January 1917 – 31 December 1919; 1 April 1935 – 31 December 1936; 1 Feb 1942 – 8 September 1943; 1 Nov 1975 – 1 January 2005
- Country: Italy
- Branch: Italian Army
- Part of: Bersaglieri Brigade "Garibaldi"
- Garrison/HQ: Cosenza
- Motto: "Invitto e pronto a rinnovar le glorie"
- Anniversaries: 18 June 1836
- Decorations: 1x Military Order of Italy; 1x Gold Medal of Military Valor; 2x Gold Medals of Army Valor

Insignia
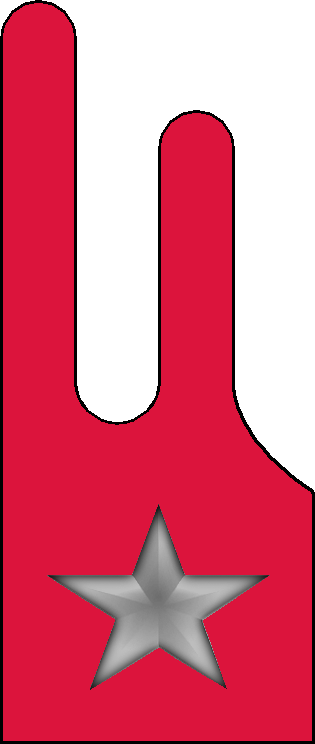
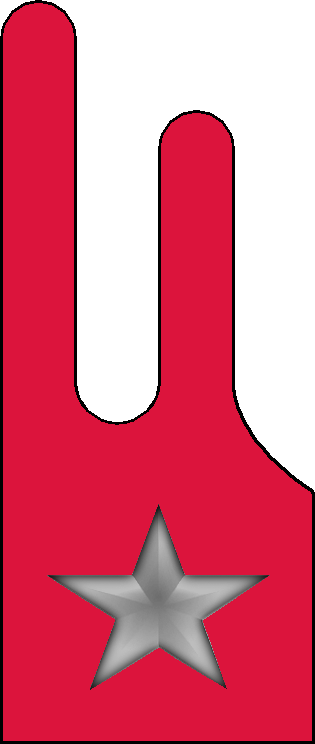
- Bersaglieri gorget patches

The 18th Bersaglieri Regiment (Italian: 18° Reggimento Bersaglieri) is an inactive unit of the Italian Army last based in Cosenza in Calabria. The regiment is part of the Italian Army's infantry corps' Bersaglieri speciality and was last operationally assigned to the Bersaglieri Brigade "Garibaldi". The regiment was formed in 1917 by the Royal Italian Army for service on the Italian front of World War I, where it distinguished itself in 1917 in the Battle of Caporetto and in 1918 in the Second Battle of the Piave River. For its conduct during the war the regiment became the only Bersaglieri regiment to be awarded a Gold Medal of Military Valor. The regiment was disbanded at the end of 1919.

The regiment was reformed in 1935 during the Second Italo-Ethiopian War and disbanded once more at the end of 1936. In 1942 the regiment was reformed as a reconnaissance unit. After the announcement of the Armistice of Cassibile on 8 September 1943 the regiment was disbanded by invading German forces. In 1975 the flag and traditions of the regiment were assigned to the 67th Bersaglieri Battalion "Fagaré", which was assigned to the Motorized Brigade "Pinerolo". In 1979 the battalion was mechanized and in 1991 it was transferred to the 8th Bersaglieri Brigade "Garibaldi". In 1993 the battalion lost its autonomy and entered the reformed 18th Bersaglieri Regiment. In 2005 the regiment was renamed 1st Bersaglieri Regiment and the flag of the 18th Bersaglieri Regiment was transferred to the Shrine of the Flags in the Vittoriano in Rome. The regiment's anniversary falls, as for all Bersaglieri units, on 18 June 1836, the day the Bersaglieri speciality was founded.

== History ==
=== World War I ===
On 31 January 1917 the depot of the 12th Bersaglieri Regiment in Livorno formed the command of the 18th Bersaglieri Regiment. The new regiment consisted of the LXVII Bersaglieri Battalion, which had been formed by the depot of the 11th Bersaglieri Regiment in Naples, the LXVIII Bersaglieri Battalion, which had been formed by the depot of the 12th Bersaglieri Regiment, and the LXIX Bersaglieri Battalion, which had been formed by the depot of the 10th Bersaglieri Regiment in Palermo. On 18 March 1917 the regiment formed, together with the 17th Bersaglieri Regiment, the III Bersaglieri Brigade, which entered the front in the Valsugana on 26 March. On 20 July of the same year the III Bersaglieri Brigade was transferred to the Isonzo front in the area of Kostanjevica na Krasu. On 19 August 1917 the brigade participated in the Eleventh Battle of the Isonzo and suffered such heavy losses it had to be taken out of the front on 20 August. Having lost 40 officers and 848 troops the battalions of the two regiments were disbanded and the survivors of the 17th Bersaglieri Regiment were grouped in one battalion, while the survivors of the 18th Bersaglieri Regiment were grouped in two battalions. On 22 August the two battalions of the 18th Bersaglieri Regiment were tasked with taking Height 244 in the Kostanjevica na Krasu sector, while the remaining battalion of the 17th Bersaglieri Regiment was to take Height 220. By evening the two heights were in Italian hands and the three battalions were reinforced with the VII Bersaglieri Complements Battalion and two battalions of the 40th Infantry Regiment of the Brigade "Bologna". On 25 August the III Bersaglieri Brigade was taken out of the line, after having lost 23 officers and 403 troops in the preceding three days.

Afterwards the brigade was rebuilt in the rear. The brigade was in the first line in the area of Hudi Log on 24 October 1917, when the Austro-Hungarian Army and Imperial German Army commenced the Battle of Caporetto. On 27 October the brigade began its retreat to the Tagliamento river. On 29 and 30 October the brigade covered the retreat of the 3rd Army over the Tagliamento bridge at Madrisio. After crossing the Piave river on 6 November the 17th Bersaglieri Regiment covered the Piave's southern bank in Candelù, while the 18th Bersaglieri Regiment was kept in reserve in Cavrié. On 16 November the Austro-Hungarians crossed the Piave at Fagaré and the 18th Bersaglieri Regiment's LXVIII and LXIX battalions were tasked to drive the enemy back over the river. By evening of the next day the Bersaglieri reached the riverbank and the Austro-Hungarian beachhead was successfully cleared. The retreat and following events cost the brigade 66 officers and 1,717 troops. In December 1917 the 18th Bersaglieri Regiment held the front at Cavazuccherina, at the Northern edge of the lagoon of Venice.

During the Second Battle of the Piave River the brigade was tasked with diversionary attacks between Cavazuccherina at the mouth of the Sile river and Cortellazzo at the mouth of the Piave river. On 20 June the brigade, together with Arditi and Royal Italian Navy Battalion "Grado", attacked and drove the Austro-Hungarians back. Between 2 and 6 July 1918 the brigade expanded the positions taken 20–22 June. In October 1918 the brigade was transferred to the Val Chiese, where it remained until the end of the war. For defeating the Austrian crossing at Fagaré in November 1917 and the operations around Cavazuccherina in June and July 1918 the 18th Bersaglieri Regiment was awarded a Gold Medal of Military Valor, while the 17th Bersaglieri Regiment was awarded a Silver Medal of Military Valor. In 1919 the regiment was deployed to Libya to help pacify the Italian colony. On 31 December 1919 the 18th Bersaglieri Regiment was disbanded.

=== Second Italo-Ethiopian War ===
On 23 March 1935 the 3rd Bersaglieri Regiment was mobilized for the Second Italo-Ethiopian War. As replacement the depot of the 3rd Bersaglieri Regiment in Livorno temporarily reformed the 18th Bersaglieri Regiment on 1 April 1935. The regiment consisted of the LXVII and LXVIII Bersaglieri battalions and was assigned to the temporarily formed 130th Infantry Division "Sabauda II". On 16 December 1936 the 3rd Bersaglieri Regiment returned from the war and consequently the 18th Bersaglieri Regiment was disbanded on 31 December 1936.

=== World War II ===
On 1 February 1942 the depot of the 5th Bersaglieri Regiment in Siena reformed the 18th Bersaglieri Regiment as an armored reconnaissance regiment. The regiment was organized as follows:

- 18th Bersaglieri Regiment
  - Command Platoon
  - I Reconnaissance Group (renamed LXVIII Battalion on 15 April 1942)
    - 1st Armored Car Company (AB41 armored cars)
    - 2nd Tank Company (L6/40 light tanks)
    - 3rd Tank Company (L6/40 light tanks)
    - 4th Motorcyclists Company
  - II Reconnaissance Group (renamed LXIX Battalion on 15 April 1942)
    - 5th Self-propelled Cannons Company (L40 self-propelled guns)
    - 6th Anti-aircraft Cannons Company (20/65 mod. 35 anti-aircraft guns)

After a few days the two tank companies were used to form the LXVII Armored Bersaglieri Battalion, which was sent to the Eastern Front in Ukraine and Russia, where the battalion was assigned to the 3rd Cavalry Division "Principe Amedeo Duca d'Aosta". On 15 April 1942 the two groups were renamed LXVIII Bersaglieri Battalion and LXIX Bersaglieri Battalion. In December 1942 the LXVII Armored Bersaglieri Battalion was destroyed during the Soviet Operation Little Saturn. On 3 January 1943 the regiment was assigned to the 4th Army, which was on occupation duty in the Italian occupied area of France. In early September 1943 the regiment was recalled to Italy as the divisional reconnaissance unit of the 136th Armored Legionary Division "Centauro", which was part of the forces defending Rome. After the announcement of the Armistice of Cassibile on 8 September 1943 parts of the regiment clashed with invading German forces between Tivoli and Zagarolo, but the regiment quickly surrendered and was disbanded by the Germans. The 4th Motorcyclists Company, which was still on the way from Southern France to Rome, fought German forces on the Futa Pass before laying down its arms.

=== Cold War ===
During the 1975 army reform the army disbanded the regimental level and newly independent battalions were granted for the first time their own flags. On 31 October 1975 the 3rd Armored Infantry Regiment was disbanded and the next day the regiment's IV Bersaglieri Battalion in Persano became an autonomous unit and was renamed 67th Bersaglieri Battalion "Fagaré". The battalion was named for the village of Fagaré on the Piave river, where the 18th Bersaglieri Regiment had distinguished itself in November 1917. The battalion was assigned to the Motorized Brigade "Pinerolo" and consisted of a command, a command and services company, three motorized companies, and a heavy mortar company with towed with 120mm Mod. 63 mortars. At the time the battalion fielded 844 men (41 officers, 94 non-commissioned officers, and 709 soldiers). On 12 November 1976 the President of the Italian Republic Giovanni Leone assigned with decree 846 the flag and traditions of the 18th Bersaglieri Regiment to the battalion.

On 1 February 1979 the Motorized Brigade "Pinerolo" was mechanized and renamed Mechanized Brigade "Pinerolo". Consequently also the 67th Bersaglieri Battalion "Fagaré" was mechanized and consisted afterwards of a command, a command and services company, three mechanized companies with M113 armored personnel carriers, and a heavy mortar company with M106 mortar carriers with 120mm Mod. 63 mortars. The battalion fielded now 896 men (45 officers, 100 non-commissioned officers, and 751 soldiers).

=== Recent times ===
As part of its reorganization after the Cold War the Italian Army moved the 8th Bersaglieri Brigade "Garibaldi" from Pordenone in Northern Italy to Caserta in Southern Italy. On 1 July 1991 the 67th Bersaglieri Battalion "Fagaré" was transferred from the Mechanized Brigade "Pinerolo" to the Bersaglieri Brigade "Garibaldi". On 31 December 1992 the 244th Motorized Infantry Battalion "Cosenza" in Cosenza was disbanded and the next day the 67th Bersaglieri Battalion "Fagaré" moved from Persano to Cosenza and took over the personnel, materiel and base of the disbanded regiment. On 9 September 1993 the 67th Bersaglieri Battalion "Fagaré" lost its autonomy and the next day entered the reformed 18th Bersaglieri Regiment.

A company of the 18th Bersaglieri Regiment was the first Italian unit to deploy to North Macedonia for a possible NATO-led ground invasion of Kosovo during the Kosovo War. The full regiment arrived soon after and together with the other units of the Bersaglieri Brigade "Garibaldi" prepared for a planned ground invasion. After the signing of the Kumanovo Agreement between the Federal Republic of Yugoslavia and NATO's Kosovo Force the regiment was one of the first NATO units to enter Kosovo. The regiment advanced to the city of Peć, where it took up garrison and peacekeeping duties until 7 September 1999. For its conduct in Kosovo the regiment was awarded a Gold Medal of Army Valor, which was affixed to the regiment's flag and added to the regiment's coat of arms.

After the regiment's return from Kosovo it was re-equipped with Dardo infantry fighting vehicles. In 2003, after the end of the Iraq War, the regiment deployed to Iraq, where it arrived on 22 June 2003 in Nasiriyah. Taking up garrison and peacekeeping duties in the city the regiment found itself soon embroiled in the Iraqi insurgency. On 7 October 2003 the regiment left Iraq and returned to Italy. For its conduct in Iraq the regiment was awarded a Gold Medal of Army Valor, which was affixed to the regiment's flag and added to the regiment's coat of arms.

On 1 January 2005 the 18th Bersaglieri Regiment was renamed 1st Bersaglieri Regiment. On 22 February of the same year the flag of the 1st Bersaglieri Regiment arrived in Cosenza, where it replaced on the same date the flag of the 18th Bersaglieri Regiment, which was consequently transferred to the Shrine of the Flags in the Vittoriano in Rome.

== See also ==
- Bersaglieri
