= 10th Bersaglieri Regiment =

Inactive Italian Army infantry unit

- 10° Reggimento Bersaglieri
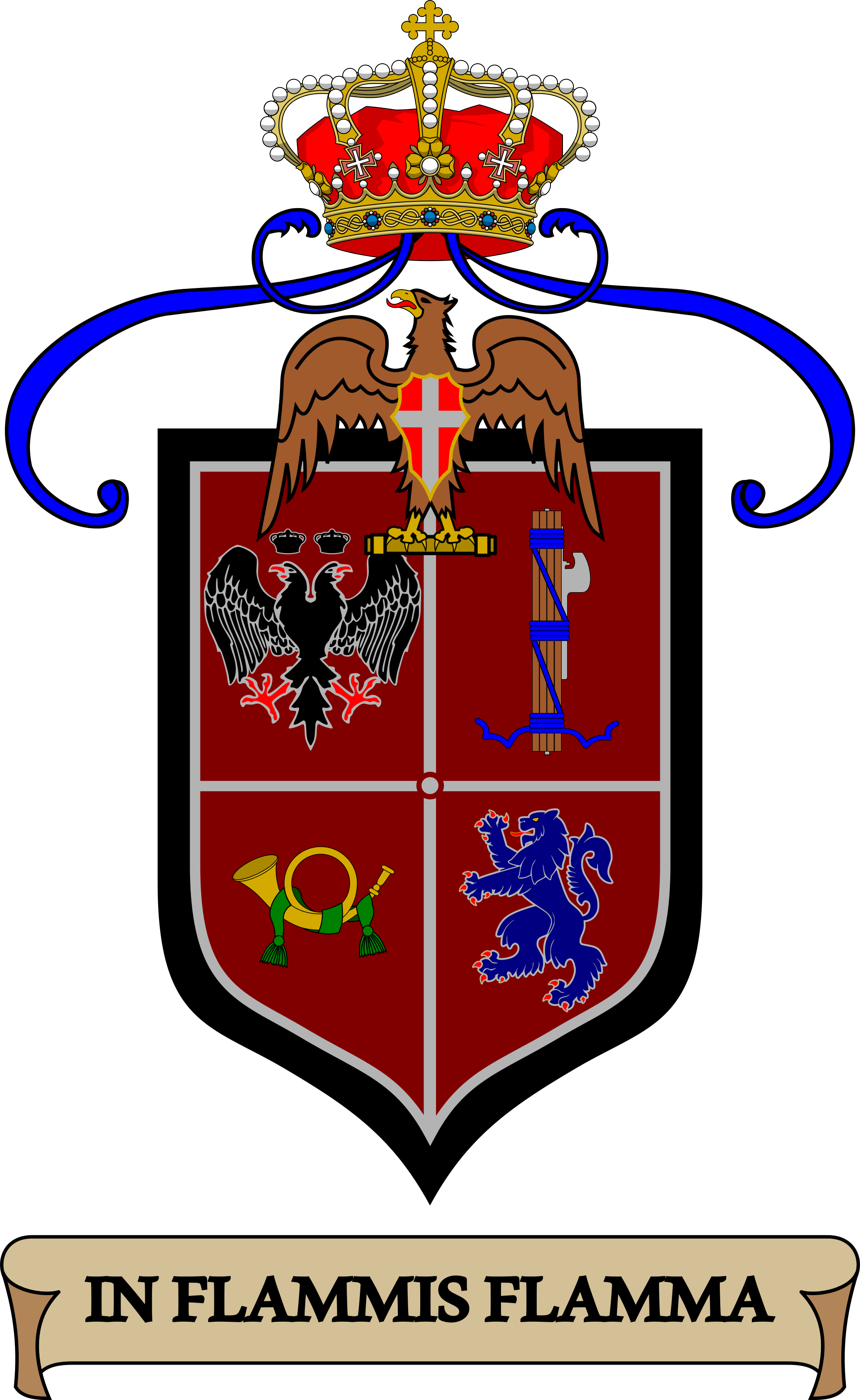
- Regimental coat of arms
- Active: 1 Jan. 1871 — 13 May 1943
- Country: Italy
- Branch: Royal Italian Army
- Garrison/HQ: Palermo
- Motto: "In flammis flamma"
- Anniversaries: 18 June 1836
- Decorations: 1x Military Order of Italy; 1x Bronze Medal of Military Valor

Insignia
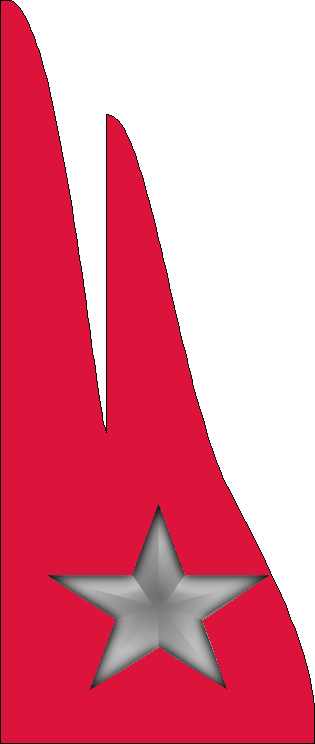
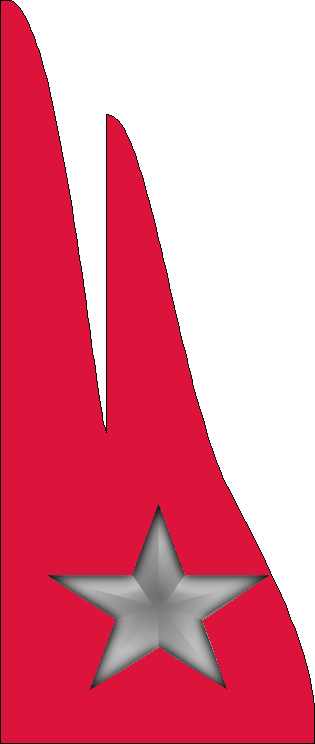
- Bersaglieri gorget patches

The 10th Bersaglieri Regiment (Italian: 10° Reggimento Bersaglieri) is an inactive unit of the Italian Army last based in Palermo in Sicily. The regiment is part of the Italian Army's infantry corps' Bersaglieri speciality. The regiment was formed in 1871 by the Royal Italian Army with preexisting battalions. In 1914 the regiment was sent to Albania, where it remained for the duration of World War I.

During World War II the regiment was sent to Libya in December 1940, where it fought in the Western Desert campaign. Soon after arriving in North Africa the regiment was overcome during Operation Compass. The regiment was reformed in Italy and sent in November 1942 to Tunisia, where it fought in the Tunisian campaign and was overcome in May 1943. In June 1943 the regiment was reformed once more and fought the following month against allied forces landing in Sicily. By the end of July, the regiment was overcome for a third time and disbanded. The regiment's anniversary falls, as for all Bersaglieri units, on 18 June 1836, the day the Bersaglieri speciality was founded.

== History ==
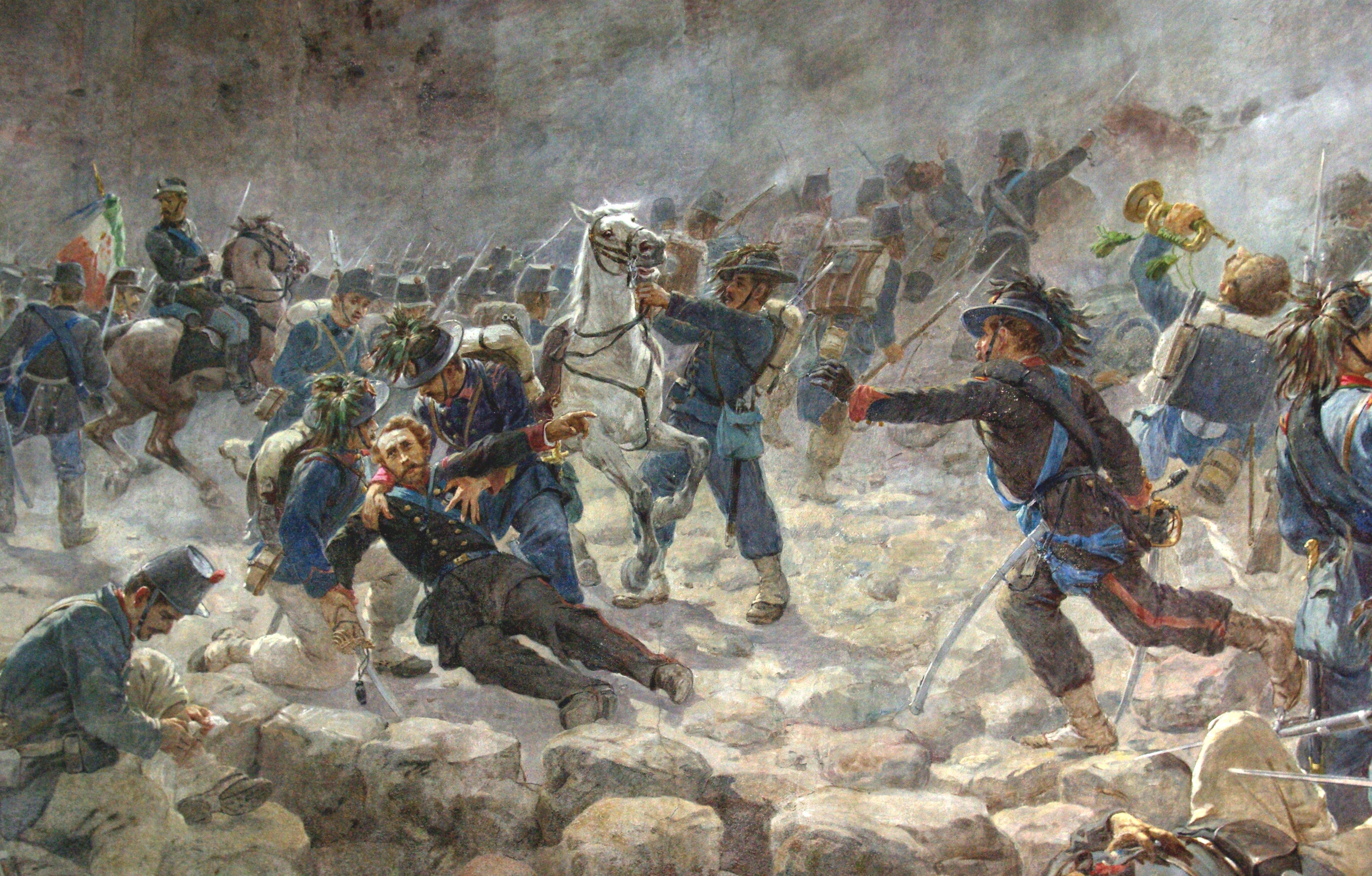
The commander of the XXXIV Battalion, Major Giacomo Pagliari, falls during the storming of Porta Pia in Rome 1870

On 1 January 1871 the 10th Bersaglieri Regiment was formed in Rome with the XVI Battalion, XXXIV Battalion, XXXV Battalion, and XXXVI Battalion, which were transferred from the 5th Bersaglieri Regiment. The four battalions were renumbered as I, II, III, and IV battalion upon entering the new regiment. On 16 September 1883 the IV Battalion was transferred to the newly formed 12th Bersaglieri Regiment. On 18 June 1886, all Bersaglieri battalions resumed their original numbering and afterwards the 10th Bersaglieri Regiment consisted of the XVI Battalion, XXXIV Battalion, and XXXV Battalion.

These three battalions had been formed in 1859 (XVI Battalion) and 1861 respectively (XXXIV and XXXV Battalion). In 1860-61 the three battalions fought in the Sardinian campaign in central and southern Italy. In 1866 the battalions participated in the Third Italian War of Independence and fought in the Battle of Custoza. In September 1870 the XXXIV and XXXV battalions participated in the capture of Rome, during which the commander of the XXXIV Battalion, Major Giacomo Pagliari, fell when the battalion stormed the breach in the Aurelian Walls near the Porta Pia.

In 1895-96 the regiment provided 16 officers and 449 troops to help form the I, II, and IV provisional battalions, which were deployed to Eritrea for the First Italo-Ethiopian War. On 1 October 1910 the regiment's depot in Verona formed the X Cyclists Battalion. During the Italo-Turkish War in 1911-12 the regiment provided eleven officers and 1,314 troops to augment units deployed for the war. In 1913 the regiment moved from Verona to Palermo.

=== World War I ===
On 29 December 1914 the regiment was sent to Vlorë in Albania, where the regiment helped manage the Serbian army's retreat through Albania in fall 1915. By February 1916 Austro-Hungarian forces had reached the Italian defensive line along the Vjosa river. For the remainder of the war the regiment fought on the Macedonian front. The regiment returned to Palermo in September 1920 when the Italian protectorate of Albania was dissolved. The regiment's X Cyclists Battalion remained in Italy and operated as an autonomous unit on the Italian front throughout the war.

As replacement for the regiment the regiment's depot in Palermo formed on 8 April 1915 the 10th bis Bersaglieri Regiment, with the LVII and LVIII battalions, which the depot had formed earlier. Upon entering the regiment the two battalions were renamed XVI bis Battalion and XXXIV bis Battalion. With elements of the two battalions the depot also formed the XXXV bis Battalion. The 10th bis Bersaglieri Regiment was immediately deployed to the Italian front. On 5 January 1916 the regiment was renamed 16th Bersaglieri Regiment and its battalions were renumbered as LVII, LVIII, and LXIII battalion. The LXIII Battalion distinguished itself on 26-27 March 1916 on Pal Piccolo, for which the battalion was awarded a Bronze Medal of Military Valor. The 16th Bersaglieri Regiment was disbanded on 7 March 1918 and its three battalions became autonomous units.

On 31 January 1917 the 10th Bersaglieri Regiment's depot in Palermo formed the LXIX Battalion for the 18th Bersaglieri Regiment. In June 1918 the X Cyclists Battalion suffered heavy losses during the Second Battle of the Piave River. On 24 June 1918 the II, VI, IX, and X Cyclists battalions were disbanded and their remaining personnel merged into a single Cyclists Assault Battalion.

=== Interwar years ===
After World War I the Royal Italian Army reduced its forces and in 1920 the XVI Battalion was first reduced to a reserve unit and then disbanded. In July 1924 the regiment became a cyclists unit and the XXXV Battalion was renumbered XVI Battalion. In 1936 the regiment lost its role as cyclists unit. On 31 March 1939 the XXXV Battalion was reformed as an active unit. On 7 April 1939 the XVI Battalion participated in the Invasion of Albania.

=== World War II ===
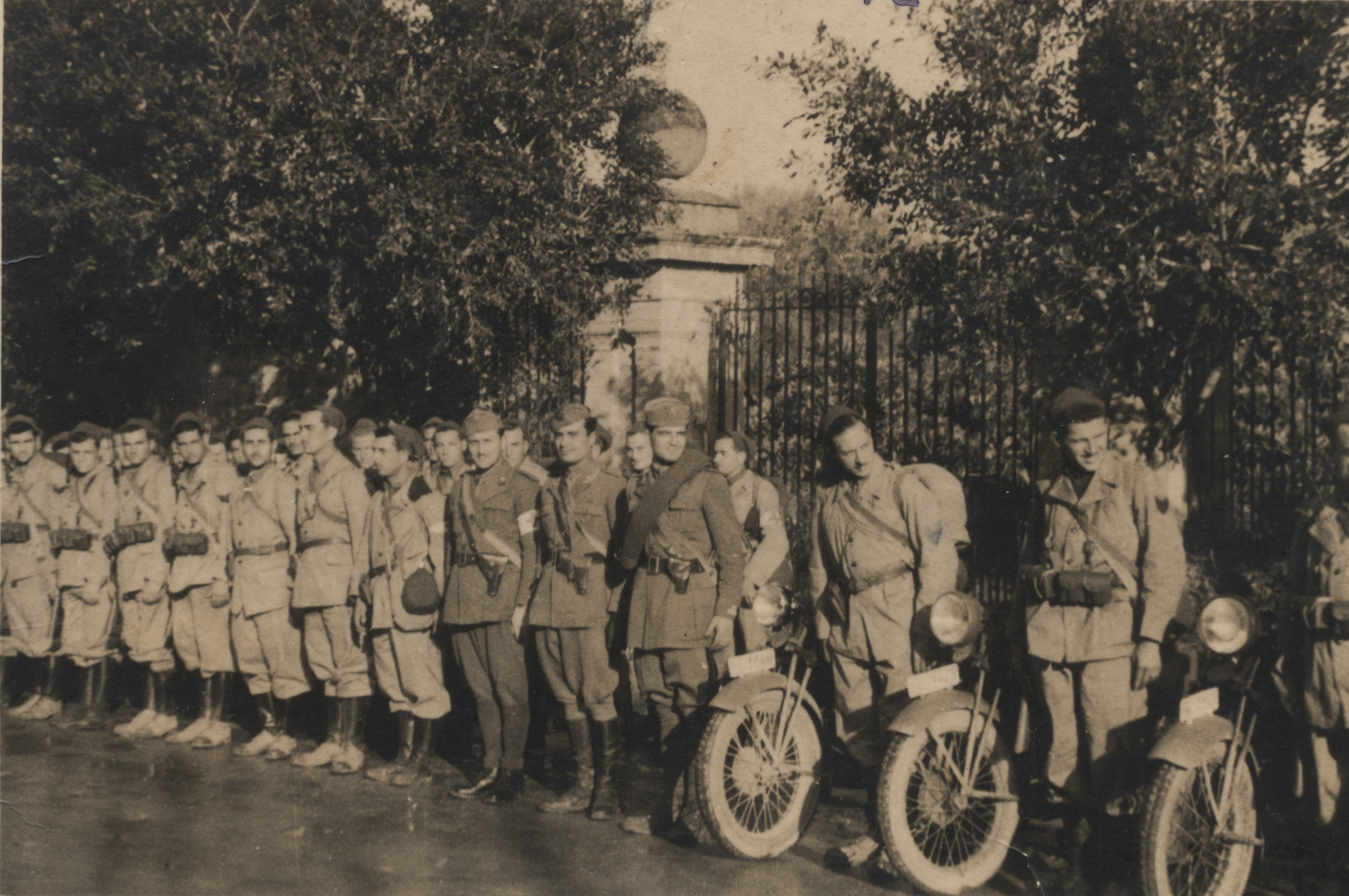
The Command Platoon of the XVI Auto-transported Battalion in Ficarazzi in November 1940

On 20 May 1940 the regiment formed the XC Battalion. and received a cannons company equipped with 47/32 mod. 35 anti-tank guns. On 10 June 1940, the day Italy entered World War II the regiment consisted of the following units:

- 10th Bersaglieri Regiment
  - Command Company
  - XVI Auto-transported Battalion
  - XXXIV Auto-transported Battalion
  - XXXV Auto-transported Battalion
  - XC Auto-transported Battalion (disbanded on 30 October 1940)
  - 10th Cannons Company, with 47/32 mod. 35 anti-tank guns
  - Transport Unit

On 9 December 1940 the British Western Desert Force commenced the Operation Compass to expel the Italian 10th Army from Egypt. The British offensive quickly devastated the 10th Army and on 13 December the 10th Bersaglieri Regiment was ordered to Libya to stop the rapid Italian retreat. On 5 February 1941 the regiment encountered British forces near Ajdabiya, which destroyed the regiment in two days of heavy combat. The regimental command escaped destruction and formed with the few survivors a provisional battalion, which continued to fight for another month, before the survivors were repatriated with the regiment's flag.

On 15 May 1941 the regiment was reformed in Palermo with the LVII and LVIII auto-transported battalions, and the LXIII Support Weapons Battalion. On 5 August 1941 the LVII and LVIII auto-transported battalions left the regiment and were sent to Libya to reinforce Italian units fighting in the Western Desert campaign. On 20 August the regiment reformed the XXXIV Battalion and XVI Battalion, which was soon renumbered XXXV Battalion. On 8 November 1942 allied forces landed in French Morocco and Algeria. On 14 November the 10th Bersaglieri Regiment arrived in Tunisia as part of the Run for Tunis. The regiment was then attached to the 1st Infantry Division "Superga" and fought in the Tunisian campaign against British forces in Southern Tunisia. On 27 March 1943 British forces flanked the Mareth Line and the Axis forces were forced to retreat. On 6 April the Battle of Wadi Akarit commenced and once more Axis forces were forced to retreat. By 24 April the 10th Bersaglieri Regiment and 5th Bersaglieri Regiment had suffered so many casualties that the two regiments formed one provisional battalion. Shortly before Axis forces surrendered on 13 May 1943 a company with survivors of the regiment was repatriated to Sicily with the regiment's flag.

On 15 June 1943 the regiment was reformed in Palermo with the CCCLXXXVI, III, and VII replacements battalions. Upon entering the regiment the three battalions were renumbered as XXXV, LXXIII, LXXIV battalions. The regiment was assigned to the XII Army Corps, which was tasked with defending Sicily to the West of a line from Cefalù to Licata. On 10 July 1943 the Allied invasion of Sicily began and the regiment moved from Chiusa Sclafani towards Agrigento. Over the next six days the regiment was annihilated in combat with American forces. By the end of July 1943 the regiment was declared lost due to wartime events. For its conduct and sacrifice at Agrigento the regiment was awarded a Bronze Medal of Military Valor.

== See also ==
- Bersaglieri
