= Cornone di Blumone =

Mountain in Italy

Coordinates: 45°57′N 10°28′E

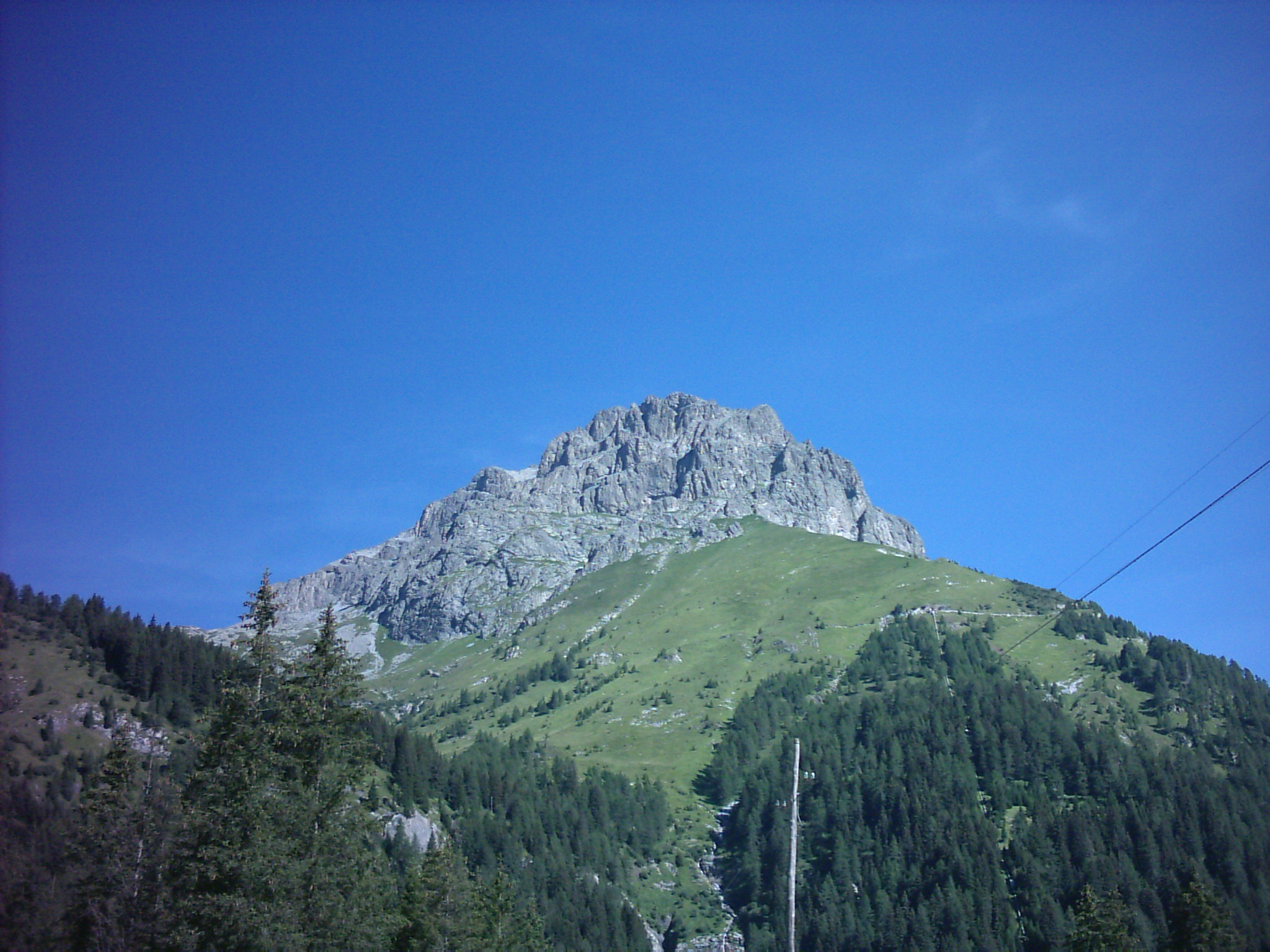

Highest point
- Elevation: 2,843 m (9,327 ft)
- Prominence: 324 m (1,063 ft)

Geography
- Location: Lombardy, Italy

Cornone di Blumone is a mountain of Lombardy, Italy, It has an elevation of 2,843 metres.
