= Fossalta di Piave =

Fossalta di Piave Fossalta
- Comune
- Comune di Fossalta di Piave
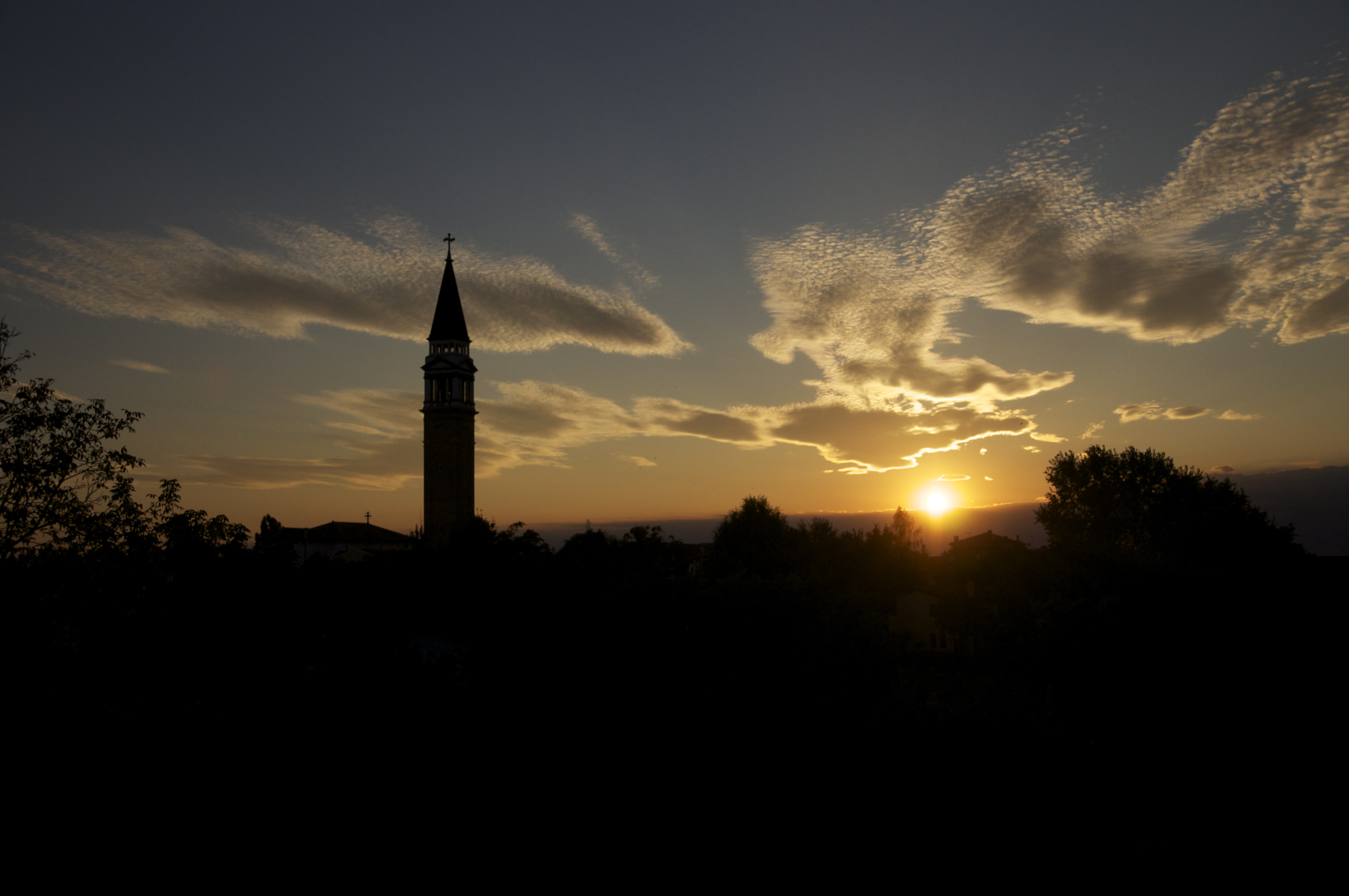
- Tramonto a Fossalta di Piave

- Location within Italy Location within Veneto
- Coordinates: 45°39′N 12°31′E
- Country: Italy
- Region: Veneto
- Metropolitan city: Venice (VE)
- Frazioni: Campolongo, Capodargine, Contee, Gonfo, Lampol, Ronche

Government
  - Mayor: Manrico Finotto

Area
  - Total: 9 km^{2} (3.5 sq mi)
- Elevation: 0 m (0 ft)

Population (28 February 2007)
  - Total: 4,238
  - Density: 470/km^{2} (1,200/sq mi)
- Demonym: Fossaltini
- Time zone: UTC+1 (CET)
  - Summer (DST): UTC+2 (CEST)
- Postal code: 30020
- Dialing code: 0421
- ISTAT code: 027015
- Patron saint: SS. Ermagora e Fortunato
- Saint day: 12 July
- Website: Official website

Fossalta di Piave is a town in the Metropolitan City of Venice, Veneto, Italy. It is southeast of E70. It is 64 kilometres (40 mi) north of Venice.

The town's approximately 4,126 inhabitants make their living in tourism and in the wine industry.
