= Kamno, Tolmin =

Kamno
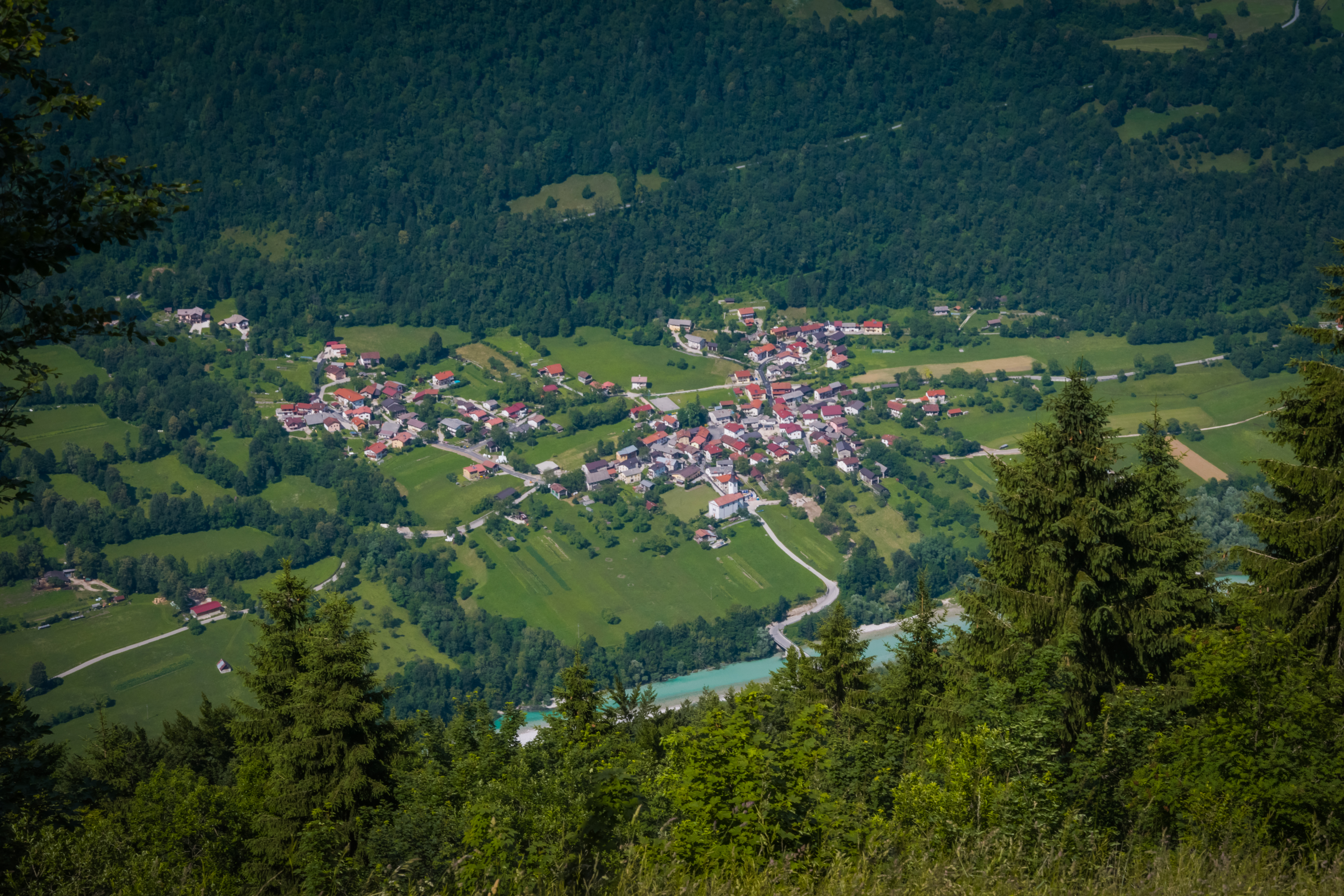

- Location in Slovenia
- Coordinates: 46°12′49.62″N 13°38′16.62″E
- Country: Slovenia
- Traditional region: Slovenian Littoral
- Statistical region: Gorizia
- Municipality: Tolmin

Area
  - Total: 7.98 km^{2} (3.08 sq mi)
- Elevation: 203.3 m (667 ft)

Population (2002)
  - Total: 248

Kamno (pronounced [ˈkaːmnɔ]) is a village on the left bank of the Soča River in the Municipality of Tolmin in the Littoral region of Slovenia.

The parish church in the settlement is dedicated to the Holy Trinity and belongs to the Diocese of Koper.
