= Armored Brigade "Centauro" =

Brigata corazzata "Centauro"
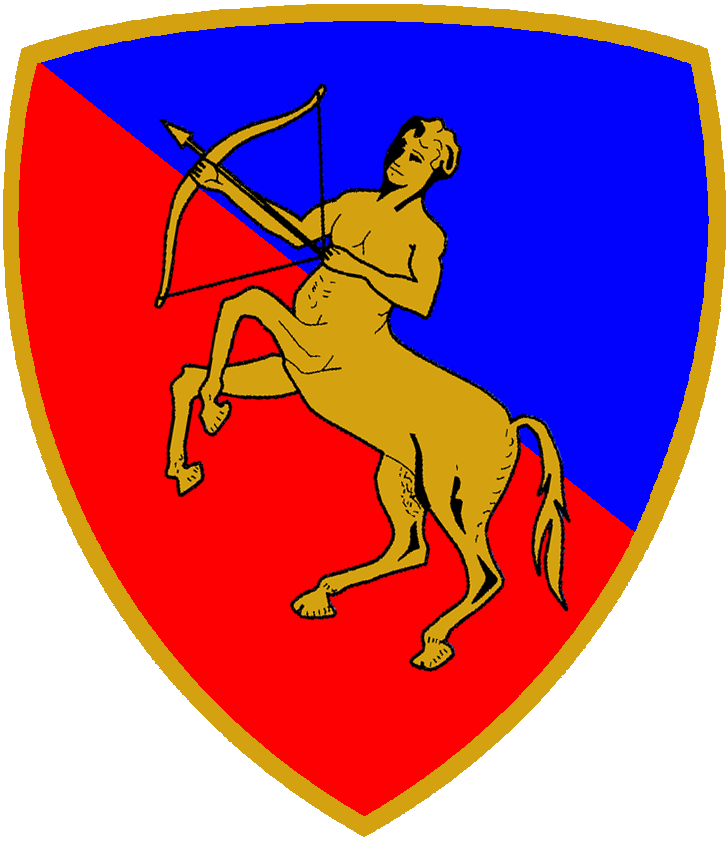
- Coat of Arms of the Armored Brigade "Centauro"
- Active: Division: 1 November 1952 - 31 October 1986; Brigade: 1 April 1951 - 31 October 1939; 1 November 1986 – 5 October 2002
- Country: Italy
- Branch: Italian Army
- Role: Armored warfare
- Part of: 3rd Army Corps
- Garrison/HQ: Novara

After World War II the Italian Army had two units named "Centauro": from 1952 to 1986 the Armored Division "Centauro" (Italian: Divisione corazzata "Centauro") and from 1986 to 2002 the Armored Brigade "Centauro" (Italian: Brigata corazzata "Centauro"). Both units were successor to the World War II era 131st Armored Division "Centauro". The units' name came from the mythological race of half human-half horse creatures named Centaurs.

== History ==
=== World War II ===
The 131st Armored Division "Centauro" was formed in April 1939. The division participated in the Greco-Italian War and invasion of Yugoslavia. In August 1942 the division was sent to Libya to fight in the Western Desert Campaign. After the Axis defeat in the Second Battle of El Alamein the division retreated with the German-Italian Panzer Army to Tunisia, where the division participated in the Tunisian Campaign. On 18 April 1943 the division was disbanded due to the losses suffered in the Battle of El Guettar.

=== Reconstitution ===
On 1 April 1951 the Italian Army raised the Armored Brigade "Centauro" in Verona and assigned it to the 4th Army Corps. In fall of 1955 the division moved its headquarters to Novara and joined 3rd Army Corps, while the units of the brigade moved to Milan and Bellinzago Novarese. On 1 November 1952 the brigade was renamed Armored Division "Centauro" and consisted of the following units.

- Armored Division "Centauro", in Novara
  - Division Headquarters
  - 3rd Bersaglieri Regiment, in Milan
    - XVIII Bersaglieri Battalion (M3 Half-tracks)
    - XX Bersaglieri Battalion (M3 Half-tracks)
    - XXV Bersaglieri Battalion (M3 Half-tracks)
    - Bersaglieri Anti-tank Company with M40 recoilless rifles)
  - 31st Tank Regiment
    - I Tank Battalion (M26 Pershing tanks, later replaced by M47 Patton main battle tanks)
    - II Tank Battalion (M26 Pershing tanks, later replaced by M47 Patton main battle tanks)
    - III Tank Battalion (M26 Pershing tanks, later replaced by M47 Patton main battle tanks)
  - 131st Armored Artillery Regiment
    - I Self-propelled Group (M7 Priest self-propelled howitzers)
    - II Self-propelled Group (M7 Priest self-propelled howitzers)
    - III Self-propelled Group (M7 Priest self-propelled howitzers; formed in February 1953)
    - IV Anti-tank Group (M36 tank destroyers)
    - V Light Anti-aircraft Group (40/56 anti-aircraft guns; formed in February 1953)
  - Armored Cavalry Squadron "Cavalleggeri di Lodi" (M8 Greyhound)
  - Engineer Battalion "Centauro"
  - Signal Battalion "Centauro"
  - Divisional Services

=== 1963 reorganization ===
In 1963 Italian divisions adapted their organization to NATO standards and thus added a brigade level to the divisions structure. The Centauro was now organized as follows:

- Armored Division "Centauro", in Novara
  - Division Headquarters
  - I Mechanized Brigade "Centauro", in Milan
    - 3rd Bersaglieri Regiment, in Milan
      - XVIII Bersaglieri Battalion (M113 armored personnel carriers)
      - XXV Bersaglieri Battalion (M113 armored personnel carriers)
      - IV Tank Battalion (M47 Patton main battle tanks)
      - Bersaglieri Anti-tank Company (M40 recoilless rifles)
    - I Group/ 131st Armored Artillery Regiment (M7 Priest self-propelled howitzers)
    - I Service Battalion
    - 1st Engineer Company
    - 1st Signal Company
  - II Armored Brigade "Centauro", in Civitavecchia
    - 1st Armored Bersaglieri Regiment, in Civitavecchia
      - I Bersaglieri Battalion (M113 armored personnel carriers)
      - VI Tank Battalion (M47 Patton main battle tanks)
      - XVIII Tank Battalion (M47 Patton main battle tanks)
    - II Group/ 131st Armored Artillery Regiment (M7 Priest self-propelled howitzers)
    - II Service Battalion
    - 2nd Engineer Company
    - 2nd Signal Company
  - III Armored Brigade "Centauro", in Novara
    - 31st Tank Regiment in Bellinzago Novarese
      - I Tank Battalion (M47 Patton main battle tanks)
      - II Tank Battalion (M47 Patton main battle tanks)
      - XXVIII Bersaglieri Battalion (M113 armored personnel carriers)
    - III Group/ 131st Armored Artillery Regiment (M7 Priest self-propelled howitzers)
    - III Service Battalion
    - 3rd Engineer Company
    - 3rd Signal Company
  - Artillery Brigade "Centauro", in Vercelli
    - 131st Armored Artillery Regiment, in Vercelli
      - IV Heavy Self-propelled Field Artillery Group (M44 self-propelled howitzers)
      - V Heavy Self-propelled Artillery Group (M55 self-propelled howitzers)
      - VI Light Air-defense Group (40 mm L/60 anti-aircraft guns, placed in reserve status on 1 September 1964)
  - XV Reconnaissance Squadrons Group "Cavalleggeri di Lodi" (M24 Chaffee light tanks and M113 armored personnel carriers)
  - CXXXI Engineer Battalion
  - CXXXI Signal Battalion
  - Light Airplane Section "Centauro" (L-21B airplanes)
  - Helicopter Section "Centauro" (AB 47J helicopters)

On 1 October 1968 the brigade headquarters were disbanded. The Armored Division "Centauro" was part of the 3rd Army Corps based in North-Western Italy. The 3rd Army Corps was tasked with defending Lombardy and Piedmont in case the 4th Alpine Army Corps and 5th Army Corps would have failed to stop Warsaw Pact forces east of the Adige river.

=== 1975 army reform ===
Before the Italian Army reform of 1975 the division had the following organization:

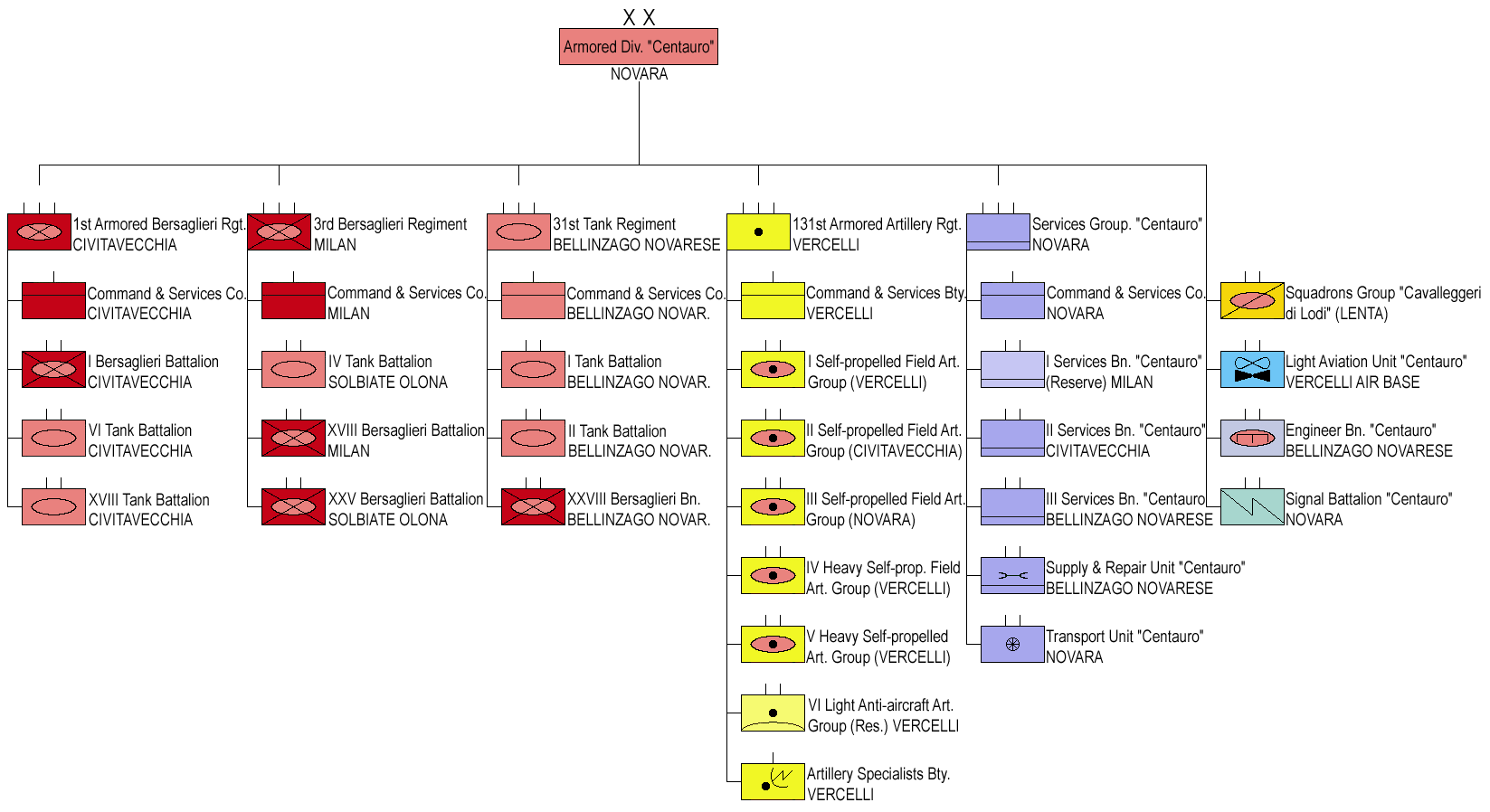
Armored Division "Centauro" in 1974

- Armored Division "Centauro", in Novara
  - 1st Armored Bersaglieri Regiment, in Civitavecchia
    - Command and Services Company, in Civitavecchia (includes an anti-tank guided missile platoon)
    - I Bersaglieri Battalion, in Civitavecchia (M113 armored personnel carriers)
    - VI Tank Battalion, in Civitavecchia (M47 Patton main battle tanks)
    - XVIII Tank Battalion, in Civitavecchia (M47 Patton main battle tanks)
  - 3rd Bersaglieri Regiment, in Milan
    - Command and Services Company, in Milan (includes an anti-tank guided missile platoon)
    - IV Tank Battalion, in Solbiate Olona (M47 Patton main battle tanks)
    - XVIII Bersaglieri Battalion, in Milan (M113 armored personnel carriers)
    - XXV Bersaglieri Battalion, in Solbiate Olona (M113 armored personnel carriers)
  - 31st Tank Regiment, in Bellinzago Novarese
    - Command and Services Company, in Bellinzago Novarese (includes an anti-tank guided missile platoon)
    - I Tank Battalion, in Bellinzago Novarese (M47 Patton main battle tanks)
    - II Tank Battalion, in Bellinzago Novarese (M47 Patton main battle tanks)
    - XXVIII Bersaglieri Battalion, in Bellinzago Novarese (M113 armored personnel carriers)
  - 131st Armored Artillery Regiment, in Vercelli
    - Command and Services Battery, in Vercelli
    - I Self-propelled Field Artillery Group, in Vercelli (M109G 155 mm self-propelled howitzers)
    - II Self-propelled Field Artillery Group, in Civitavecchia (M109G 155mm self-propelled howitzers)
    - III Self-propelled Field Artillery Group, in Novara (M109G 155mm self-propelled howitzers)
    - IV Heavy Self-propelled Field Artillery Group, in Vercelli (M44 155 mm self-propelled howitzers)
    - V Heavy Self-propelled Artillery Group, in Vercelli (M55 203 mm self-propelled howitzers)
    - VI Light Anti-aircraft Artillery Group (Reserve), in Vercelli (L60 40 mm anti-aircraft guns and 12.7mm anti-aircraft machine guns)
    - Artillery Specialists Battery, in Vercelli
  - "Cavalleggeri di Lodi" Squadrons Group, in Lenta (Fiat Campagnola reconnaissance vehicles and M47 Patton tanks)
  - Light Aviation Unit "Centauro", at Vercelli Air Base (L-19E Bird Dog light aircraft and AB 206 reconnaissance helicopters)
  - Engineer Battalion "Centauro", in Bellinzago Novarese
  - Signal Battalion "Centauro", in Novara
  - Services Grouping "Centauro", in Novara
    - Command and Services Company, in Novara
    - Supply, Repairs, Recovery Unit "Centauro", in Bellinzago Novarese
    - Transport Unit "Centauro", in Novara
    - I Services Battalion "Centauro" (Reserve), in Milan
    - II Services Battalion "Centauro", in Civitavecchia
    - III Services Battalion "Centauro", in Bellinzago Novarese

In 1975 the Italian Army undertook a major reorganization of it forces: the regimental level was abolished and battalions came under direct command of newly formed multi-arms brigades. The 3rd Bersaglieri Regiment became the 3rd Mechanized Brigade "Goito" and the 31st Tank Regiment became the 31st Armored Brigade "Curtatone". The units of the 1st Armored Bersaglieri Regiment were transferred to the Mechanized Brigade "Granatieri di Sardegna" in Rome. On 21 October 1975 the Centauro took command of the two newly created brigades and additional units to bring it up to full strength.

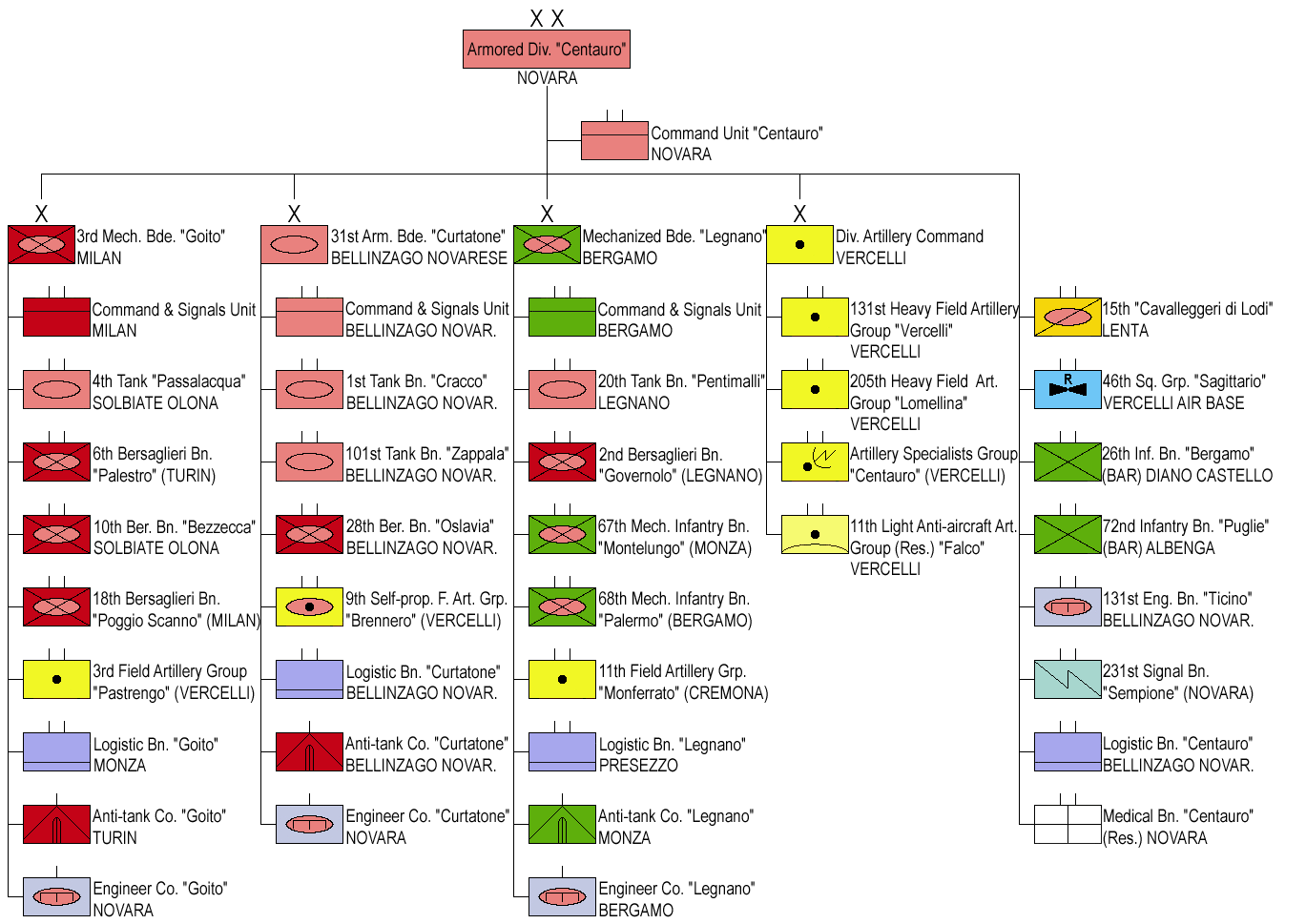
Armored Division "Centauro" in 1977

- Armored Division "Centauro", in Novara
  - Command Unit "Centauro", in Novara
  - Divisional Artillery Command, in Vercelli
    - 131st Heavy Field Artillery Group "Vercelli", in Vercelli (M114 155 mm towed howitzers)
    - 205th Heavy Field Artillery Group "Lomellina", in Vercelli (M114 155 mm towed howitzers)
    - Artillery Specialists Group "Centauro", in Vercelli
    - 11th Light Anti-aircraft Artillery Group "Falco" (Reserve), in Vercelli
  - 15th Squadrons Group "Cavalleggeri di Lodi", in Lenta
  - 26th Infantry Battalion "Bergamo" (BAR), in Diano Castello
  - 72nd Infantry Battalion "Puglie" (BAR), in Albenga
  - 131st Engineer Battalion "Ticino", in Bellinzago Novarese
  - 231st Signal Battalion "Sempione", in Novara
  - Logistic Battalion "Centauro", in Bellinzago Novarese
  - 46th Reconnaissance Helicopters Squadrons Group "Sagittario", at Vercelli Air Base
    - Command and Services Squadron
    - 461st Reconnaissance Helicopters Squadron (AB 206 reconnaissance helicopters)
    - 462nd Reconnaissance Helicopters Squadron (AB 206 reconnaissance helicopters)
  - Medical Battalion "Centauro" (Reserve), in Novara
  - 3rd Mechanized Brigade "Goito", in Milan
    - Command and Signal Unit "Goito", in Milan
    - 4th Tank Battalion "M.O. Passalacqua", in Solbiate Olona (Leopard 1A2 main battle tanks)
    - 6th Bersaglieri Battalion "Palestro", in Turin
    - 10th Bersaglieri Battalion "Bezzecca", in Solbiate Olona
    - 18th Bersaglieri Battalion "Poggio Scanno", in Milan
    - 3rd Field Artillery Group "Pastrengo", in Vercelli (M114 155 mm towed howitzers)
    - Logistic Battalion "Goito", in Monza
    - Anti-tank Company "Goito", in Turin
    - Engineer Company "Goito", in Novara
  - 31st Armored Brigade "Curtatone", in Bellinzago Novarese
    - Command and Signal Unit "Curtatone", in Bellinzago Novarese
    - 1st Tank Battalion "M.O. Cracco", in Bellinzago Novarese (Leopard 1A2 main battle tanks)
    - 101st Tank Battalion "M.O. Zappala", in Bellinzago Novarese (Leopard 1A2 main battle tanks)
    - 28th Bersaglieri Battalion "Oslavia", in Bellinzago Novarese
    - 9th Self-propelled Field Artillery Group "Brennero", in Vercelli (M44 155 mm self-propelled howitzers)
    - Logistic Battalion "Curtatone", in Bellinzago Novarese
    - Anti-tank Company "Curtatone", in Bellinzago Novarese
    - Engineer Company "Curtatone", in Novara
  - Mechanized Brigade "Legnano", in Bergamo
    - Command and Signal Unit "Legnano", in Bergamo
    - 2nd Bersaglieri Battalion "Governolo", in Legnano
    - 67th Mechanized Infantry Battalion "Montelungo", in Monza
    - 68th Mechanized Infantry Battalion "Palermo", in Bergamo
    - 20th Tank Battalion "M.O. Pentimalli", in Legnano (Leopard 1A2 main battle tanks)
    - 11th Field Artillery Group "Monferrato", in Cremona (M114 155 mm towed howitzers)
    - Logistic Battalion "Legnano", in Presezzo
    - Anti-tank Company "Legnano", in Monza
    - Engineer Company "Legnano", Bergamo

=== Armored Brigade "Centauro" ===
The 31st Armored Brigade "Curtatone" was named for the Battle of Curtatone and Montanara fought during the First Italian War of Independence. The brigade's authorized strength was 3,381 men (214 Officers, 516 non-commissioned officers and 2,651 soldiers). On 31 October 1986 the Italian Army abolished the divisional level and brigades, that until then had been under one of the Army's four divisions, came forthwith under direct command of the Army's 3rd or 5th Army Corps. As the Centauro a historically significant name, the division ceased to exist on 31 October in Novara, but the next day in the same location the Armored Brigade "Centauro" was activated. The new brigade took command of the units of the 31st Armored Brigade "Curtatone", whose name was stricken from the roll of active units of the Italian Army. The brigade was part of the 3rd Army Corps based in North-Western Italy and was organized as follows:

- 31st Armored Brigade "Centauro", in Novara
  - Command and Signal Unit "Centauro", in Novara
  - 1st Tank Battalion "M.O. Cracco", in Bellinzago Novarese (Leopard 1A2 main battle tanks)
  - 101st Tank Battalion "M.O. Zappalà", in Bellinzago Novarese (Leopard 1A2 main battle tanks)
  - 28th Bersaglieri Battalion "Oslavia", in Bellinzago Novarese (VCC-2 armoured personnel carriers)
  - 9th Self-propelled Field Artillery Group "Brennero", in Vercelli (M109 155 mm self-propelled howitzers)
  - Logistic Battalion "Centauro", in Bellinzago Novarese
  - Bersaglieri Anti-tank Company "Centauro", in Bellinzago Novarese
  - Engineer Company "Centauro", in Novara

== 1990–2000 ==
During the 1990s the brigade's structure fluctuated wildly as the Italian Army drew down its forces after the end of the Cold War. On 5 November 1990 the 11th Infantry (Recruits Training) Battalion "Casale" in Casale Monferrato joined the brigade, followed on 1 June 1991 by a medical battalion from the disbanded Mechanized Brigade "Goito". On 1 July 1991 101st Tank Battalion joined the Bersaglieri Brigade "Garibaldi" and transferred to Persano in the south of Italy. In the following year the 1st Tank Battalion was renamed 31st Tank Regiment without changing its size or composition, similarly the 9th Self-propelled Field Artillery Group became the 131st Self-propelled Field Artillery Regiment. The Anti-tank company was disbanded and the Sapper company merged into the Command and Signal Unit to form the Command and Tactical Supports Unit "Centauro".

On 9 October 1995 the 31st Tank Regiment received the war flag and name of the 4th Tank Regiment and transferred its own name and war flag to the 133rd Tank Regiment in Altamura, followed on 10 October 1995 by the 131st Self-propelled Field Artillery Regiment "Centauro", which received the war flag and name of the 52nd Self-propelled Artillery Regiment "Torino" from the disbanding Mechanized Brigade "Legnano" and transferred its own name and war flag to the 2nd Self-propelled Artillery Regiment "Potenza" in Barletta. The 31st Tank Regiment and 131st Artillery Regiment became both units of the Mechanized Brigade "Pinerolo".

During 1996 the brigade also gained the 2nd and 3rd Bersaglieri regiments from the Legnano, while the 28th Bersaglieri Battalion was disbanded. On 5 November 1996 the 21st Infantry Regiment "Cremona" in Alessandria from the disbanded Motorized Brigade "Cremona" entered the brigade. Followed by the Regiment "Nizza Cavalleria" (1st) in Pinerolo, which was transferred from the 3rd Army Corps. In 1998 the 11th Infantry (Recruits Training) Battalion "Casale" was transferred to the army's Training Brigade, thus the "Centauro" brigade entered the new millennium with the following units:

- Mechanized Brigade "Centauro", in Novara
  - Command and Tactical Supports Unit "Centauro", in Novara
  - Regiment "Nizza Cavalleria" (1st), in Pinerolo (Centauro tank destroyers)
  - 4th Tank Regiment, in Bellinzago Novarese (Ariete main battle tanks)
  - 2nd Bersaglieri Regiment, in Legnano (VCC-2 armoured personnel carriers)
  - 3rd Bersaglieri Regiment, in Milan (VCC-2 armoured personnel carriers)
  - 21st Infantry Regiment "Cremona", in Alessandria (VCC-2 armoured personnel carriers)
  - 52nd Self-propelled Field Artillery Regiment "Torino", in Vercelli (M109L 155 mm self-propelled howitzers)
  - Logistic Battalion "Centauro", in Bellinzago Novarese
  - Medical Battalion "Centauro", in Novara

== 2000–2002 ==
In 2001 the Logistic Battalion and Medical Battalion were transferred to the army's newly formed Logistic Brigade. The 2nd Bersaglieri Regiment was disbanded in 2001, followed by the brigade on 5 October 2002. The remaining units were distributed among other brigades: the Nizza Cavalleria joined the Alpine Brigade "Taurinense", the 3rd Bersaglieri and 4th Tank Regiment joined the Armored Brigade "Ariete", the 21st Infantry Regiment "Cremona" and 52nd Self-propelled Artillery Regiment joined the Cavalry Brigade "Pozzuolo del Friuli".

== See also ==
131st Armored Division "Centauro"
