= Logistic Battalion "Piemonte" =

Inactive Italian Army brigade logistics unit

- Battaglione Logistico "Piemonte"
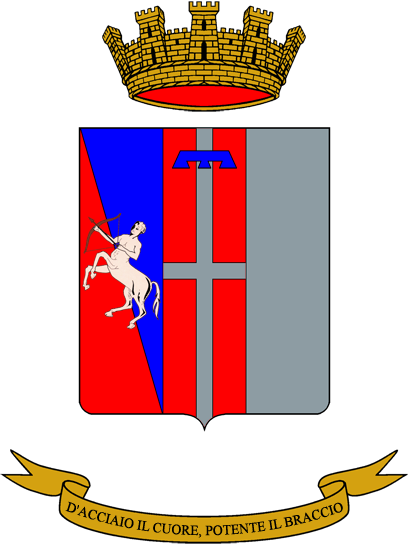
- Battalion coat of arms
- Active: 1 Jan. 1976 — 31 July 1991
- Country: Italy
- Branch: Italian Army
- Role: Military logistics
- Part of: 3rd Army Corps
- Garrison/HQ: Novara
- Motto(s): "D'acciaio il cuore, potente il braccio"
- Anniversaries: 22 May 1916 - Battle of Asiago

Insignia
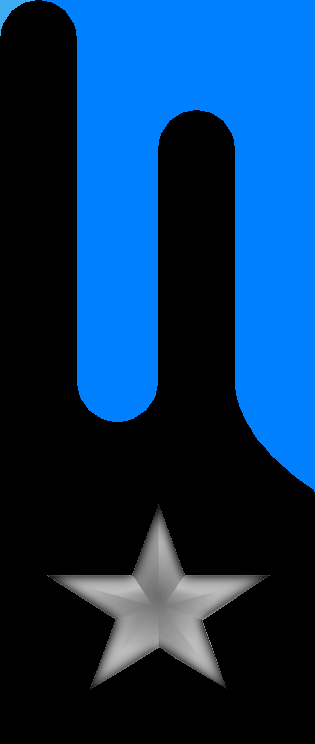
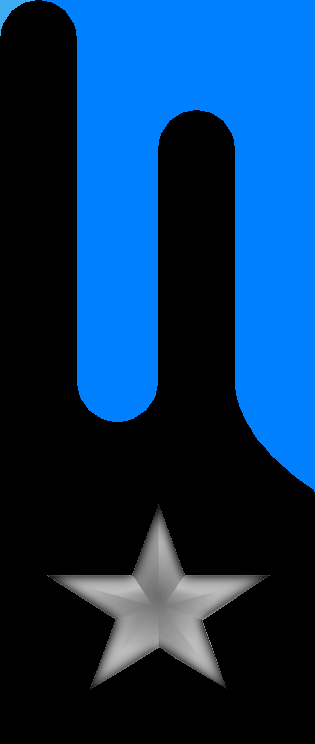
- Unit gorget patches

The Logistic Battalion "Piemonte" (Italian: Battaglione Logistico "Piemonte") is an inactive military logistics battalion of the Italian Army. The battalion was formed in 1976 as Logistic Battalion "Centauro" and assigned to the Armored Division "Centauro". After the division was disbanded in 1986 the battalion was reorganized as a brigade logistic battalion and renamed Logistic Battalion "Piemonte". From 1986 to 1991, the battalion was assigned to the 3rd Army Corps and earmarked to support the reserve Motorized Brigade "Piemonte". The battalion was disbanded in 1991. The battalion's anniversary falls, as for all units of the Italian Army's Transport and Materiel Corps, on 22 May, the anniversary of the Royal Italian Army's first major use of automobiles to transport reinforcements to the Asiago plateau to counter the Austro-Hungarian Asiago Offensive in May 1916.

== History ==
=== World War II ===
The battalion is the spiritual successor of the logistic units of the Royal Italian Army's I Motor-mechanized Brigade, which was formed on 2 June 1936 and expanded, on 20 April 1939, to 131st Armored Division "Centauro". The division participated in the Tunisian campaign, during which the division was destroyed in May 1943. The battalion is also the spiritual successor of the logistic units of the 136th Armored Legionary Division "Centauro", which was active from July to September 1943.

=== Cold War ===
On 1 April 1951, the Armored Brigade "Centauro" was formed in Verona. The brigade inherited the traditions of the two preceding divisions bearing the name "Centauro". On 1 November 1952, the brigade was expanded to Armored Division "Centauro". In fall of 1955, the division moved its headquarters to Novara and joined the 3rd Army Corps.

On 1 October 1956, the logistic units of the division were assigned to the newly formed Service Units Command "Centauro" in Novara. The command consisted of a medical section, a provisions section, a mobile vehicle park, a mobile workshop, and an auto unit. On 10 November 1961, the mobile vehicle park and mobile workshop merged to form the Resupply, Repairs, Recovery Unit "Centauro".

In 1963, the Italian Army reorganized its armored divisions along NATO standards and added a brigade level to the divisions' organization. On 1 November 1963, the Service Units Command "Centauro" in Novara was reorganized as Services Grouping Command "Centauro". On 1 November 1964, the command of the II Services Battalion "Centauro" was activated in Civitavecchia and assigned to the II Armored Brigade "Centauro". On 12 August 1965, the command of the I Services Battalion "Centauro" was activated in Milan and assigned to the I Mechanized Brigade "Centauro" and, on 1 September 1965, the command of the III Services Battalion "Centauro" was activated in Bellinzago Novarese and assigned to the III Armored Brigade "Centauro".

The three service battalions of the division's brigades consisted of a command, a command company, a auto unit, a medical company, and a Resupply, Repairs, Recovery Unit, while the Services Grouping Command "Centauro" consisted of a command, a command platoon, the Auto Unit "Centauro", the Medical Company "Centauro", the Resupply, Repairs, Recovery Unit "Centauro", and the Provisions Company "Centauro", which was disbanded in 1964. On 1 November 1966, the Services Grouping Command "Centauro" expanded its Command Platoon to a Command Company.

On 30 September 1968, the division's three brigade headquarters were disbanded and the next day, on 1 October 1968, the three service battalions were assigned to the division's Services Grouping Command "Centauro". The command now consisted of a command, a command company, the Auto Unit "Centauro", the Resupply, Repairs, Recovery Unit "Centauro", the Medical Company "Centauro", and the three service battalions.

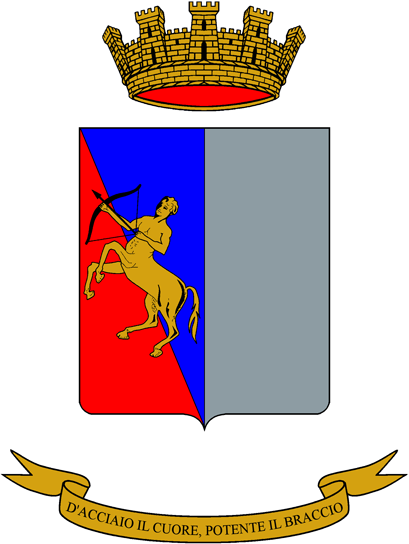
Coat of arms of the Logistic Battalion "Centauro"

As part of the 1975 army reform the Armored Division "Centauro" was reorganized: on 1 August 1975, the II Services Battalion "Centauro" was transferred to the Infantry Division "Granatieri di Sardegna", while on 21 October 1975 the 3rd Mechanized Brigade "Goito" and 31st Armored Brigade "Curtatone" were formed with "Centauro" division's units. On 1 January 1976, the I Services Battalion "Centauro" was renamed Logistic Battalion "Goito" and assigned to the 3rd Mechanized Brigade "Goito", while the III Services Battalion "Centauro" was renamed Logistic Battalion "Curtatone" and assigned to the 31st Armored Brigade "Curtatone".

On the same date, 1 January 1976, the division's services grouping command in Novara was reorganized and renamed Logistic Battalion "Centauro", which received the traditions of all preceding logistic, transport, medical, maintenance, and supply units bearing the name "Centauro". The battalion consisted of a command, a command platoon, a supply and transport company, a medium workshop, and a vehicle park. At the time the battalion fielded 472 men (21 officers, 66 non-commissioned officers, and 385 soldiers).

On 12 November 1976, the President of the Italian Republic Giovanni Leone granted with decree 846 the battalion a flag.

On 1 October 1981, the battalion was reorganized and renamed Maneuver Logistic Battalion "Centauro". At the time the battalion consisted of the following units:

- Maneuver Logistic Battalion "Centauro", in Novara
  - Command and Services Company
  - Supply Company
  - Maintenance Company
  - Medium Transport Company
  - Mixed Transport Company

In 1986, the Italian Army abolished the divisional level and brigades, which until then had been under one of the Army's four divisions, came under direct command of the Army's 3rd Army Corps or 5th Army Corps. As the Armored Division "Centauro" carried the traditions of the 131st Armored Division "Centauro", which had distinguished itself in the Tunisian campaign of World War II, the army decided to retain the name of the division. On 31 October 1986, the command of the Armored Division "Centauro" in Novara was disbanded and the next day the command of the 31st Armored Brigade "Curtatone" moved from Bellinzago Novarese to Novara, where the command was renamed 31st Armored Brigade "Centauro". The "Centauro" brigade retained the Curtatone's units, which, including the Logistic Battalion "Curtatone", changed their names from "Curtatone" to "Centauro".

On the same date, 1 November 1986, the Maneuver Logistic Battalion "Centauro" was assigned to the Support Units Command of the 3rd Army Corps. As there existed now the "Centauro" brigade's Logistic Battalion "Centauro" and the disbanded division's Maneuver Logistic Battalion "Centauro", the army decided to rename the latter. On 1 May 1987, the Maneuver Logistic Battalion "Centauro" was renamed Maneuver Logistic Battalion "Piemonte". The battalion also received a new coat of arms, and was subsequently, reorganized as a brigade logistic battalion. As per army naming convention for logistic units supporting brigades the battalion was named for the brigade it would support, namely the Motorized Brigade "Piemonte", which was one of three wartime mobilization brigades of the Italian Army.

On 1 February 1988, the battalion had finished its reorganization and was renamed Logistic Battalion "Piemonte". At the time the battalion consisted of the following units:

- Logistic Battalion "Piemonte", in Novara
  - Command and Services Company
  - Supply Company
  - Maintenance Company
  - Medium Transport Company
  - Medical Unit (Reserve)

=== Recent times ===
On 31 July 1991, the Logistic Battalion "Piemonte" was disbanded and the following 7 November the battalion's flag was transferred to the Shrine of the Flags in the Vittoriano in Rome for safekeeping.

== See also ==
- Military logistics
