= 1st Bersaglieri Regiment =

Active Italian Army mechanized infantry unit

- 1° Reggimento bersaglieri
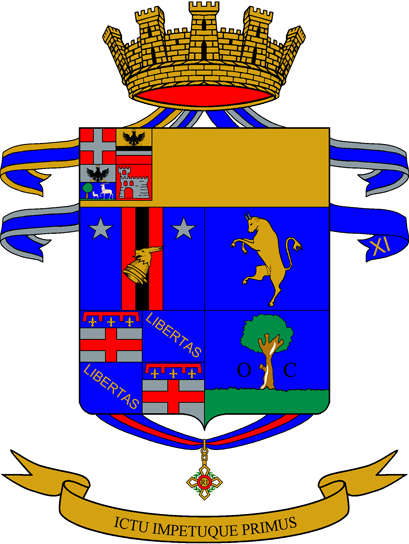
- Regimental coat of arms
- Active: 16 April 1861 — 8 Sept. 1943; 1 Jan. 1953 — today
- Country: Italy
- Branch: Italian Army
- Part of: Bersaglieri Brigade "Garibaldi"
- Garrison/HQ: Cosenza
- Motto: "Ictu impetuque primus"
- Anniversaries: 18 June 1836
- Decorations: 2x Military Order of Italy; 1x Gold Medal of Military Valor; 2x Silver Medals of Military Valor; 11x Bronze Medal of Military Valor

Insignia
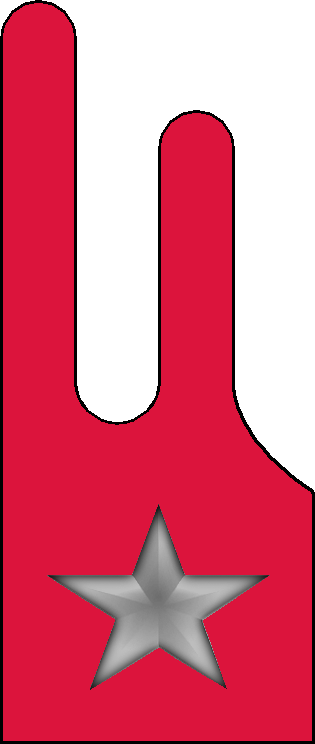
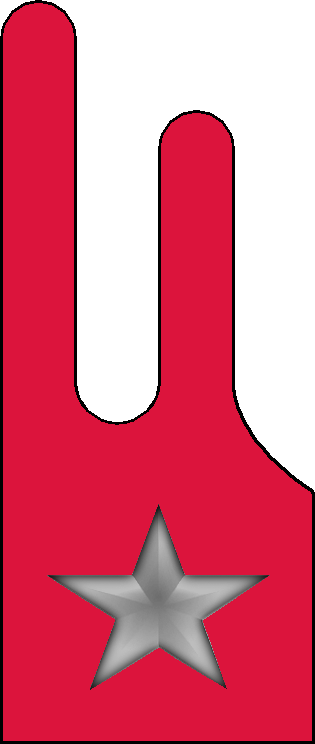
- Bersaglieri gorget patches

The 1st Bersaglieri Regiment (Italian: 1° Reggimento Bersaglieri) is an active unit of the Italian Army based in Cosenza in the Calabria region. The regiment is part of the Italian infantry corps' Bersaglieri speciality and operationally assigned to the Bersaglieri Brigade "Garibaldi". The regiment is the most often decorated unit of the Italian Army with 14 medals for military valor. The regiment was formed in 1861 by the Royal Italian Army with preexisting battalions. During World War I the regiment's battalions served initially in Libya and then on the Italian front.

During World War II the regiment fought in the Greco-Italian War and then in the Invasion of Yugoslavia. In 1942 the regiment participated in the Case Anton, occupation of Vichy France. The regiment was disbanded by German forces after the announcement of the Armistice of Cassibile on 8 September 1943. In 1953 the regiment was reformed and in 1958 it was assigned to the Infantry Division "Granatieri di Sardegna". In 1964 the regiment was transferred to the Armored Division "Centauro". In 1975 the regiment returned to the Infantry Division "Granatieri di Sardegna". In 1976 the regiment was disbanded and its flag and traditions assigned to the 1st Bersaglieri Battalion "La Marmora". The regiment was reformed in 1995. Between 2000 and 2005 the regiment was without personnel. In 2005 the 18th Bersaglieri Regiment of the Mechanized Brigade "Garibaldi" was renamed 1st Bersaglieri Regiment. The regiment's anniversary falls, as for all Bersaglieri units, on 18 June 1836, the day the Bersaglieri speciality was founded.

== History ==
On 16 April 1861 the 1st Army Corps Bersaglieri Command was formed in Cuneo and assigned to the I Army Corps. The command had purely administrative functions and consisted of the preexisting I, IX, XIII, XIX, XXI, and XXVII battalions, and the I Bersaglieri Depot Battalion. On 31 December 1861 the command was renamed 1st Bersaglieri Regiment, but continued to exert only administrative functions. On 18 December 1864 the Bersaglieri regiments were reduced from six to five and consequently the 4th Bersaglieri Regiment was disbanded and its VI and VII battalions were transferred to the 1st Bersaglieri Regiment. In 1866, in preparation for the Third Italian War of Independence, the regiment formed the XLI Battalion, which was disbanded in December 1870.

On 1 January 1871 the 1st Bersaglieri Regiment was reorganized as an operational regiment with the I Battalion, VII Battalion, IX Battalion, and XXVII Battalion, while the VI Battalion, XIII Battalion, XIX Battalion, and XXI Battalion were transferred to the reformed 6th Bersaglieri Regiment. The four remaining battalions were renumbered as I, II, III, and IV battalion. On 16 September 1883 the IV Battalion was transferred to the newly formed 11th Bersaglieri Regiment. On 18 June 1886, all Bersaglieri battalions resumed their original numbering and afterwards the 2nd Bersaglieri Regiment consisted of the I Battalion, VII Battalion, and IX Battalion.

The I Battalion had been formed by the Royal Sardinian Army in 1848 and included the 1st Company, which had been formed in July 1836 and was the Bersaglieri speciality's oldest company. In 1848 the battalion fought in the First Italian War of Independence. On 6 May 1848, during the Battle of Santa Lucia, the battalion's 1st Company distinguished itself fighting inside the walls of the city of Verona. For this the 1st Company was awarded a Bronze Medal of Military Valor. On 18 June 1848, the battalion's 3rd Company, which had been formed with volunteer students, distinguished itself fighting on Monte Baldo and was awarded a Bronze Medal of Military Valor. On 22–25 July the battalion's 1st Company distinguished itself in the Battle of Custoza and was awarded its second Bronze Medal of Military Valor. On 5 April 1849 the battalion's 2nd Company and 4th Company helped crush the revolt of the citizens of Genoa against the Sardinian occupation. Each of the two companies was awarded a Bronze Medal of Military Valor for the suppression of the revolt. All five Bronze Medals of Military Valor were affixed to the flag of the 1st Bersaglieri Regiment and added to the regiment's coat of arms, when the I Battalion joined the regiment.

In 1849 the Royal Sardinian Army formed the VII Battalion and in 1850 the IX Battalion. In 1855 the I Battalion's 1st and 2nd companies were assigned to the I Provisional Bersaglieri Battalion, while the VII Battalion's 25th and 26th companies were assigned to the IV Provisional Bersaglieri Battalion, and the IX Battalion's 33rd and 34th companies were assigned to the V Provisional Bersaglieri Battalion. The three provisional battalions were part of the Sardinian Expeditionary Corps, which fought in the Crimean War. The battalions fought in the Battle of the Chernaya and the Siege of Sevastopol.

In 1859 the three battalions participated in the Second Italian War of Independence. On 21–25 May 1859 the VII Battalion distinguished itself during the crossing of the Sesia river and the advance towards Palestro and Borgo Vercelli. Five days later, on 30–31 May 1859, the VII Battalion displayed exceptional bravery during the Battle of Palestro. For the crossing of the Sesia and advance to Palestro the VII Battalion was awarded a Bronze Medal of Military Valor and for its conduct in the Battle of Palestro the VII Battalion was awarded Gold Medal of Military Valor. Both medals were affixed to the flag of the 1st Bersaglieri Regiment and added to the regiment's coat of arms, when the VII Battalion joined the regiment. On 24 June 1859 the three battalions fought in the Battle of Solferino, during which the I Battalion distinguished itself and was awarded a Bronze Medal of Military Valor, which was affixed to the flag of the 1st Bersaglieri Regiment and added to the regiment's coat of arms, when the battalion joined the regiment.

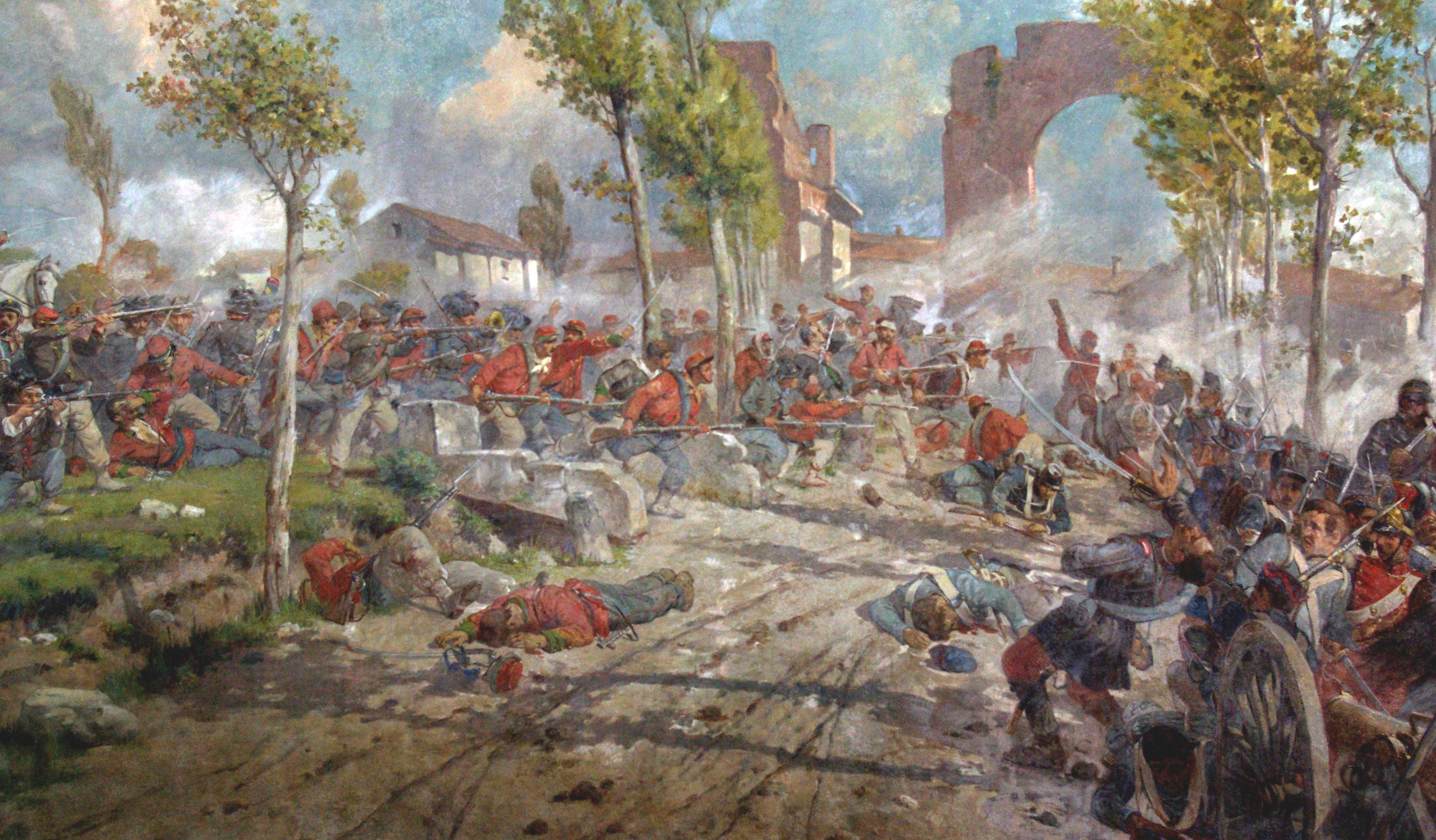
Bersaglieri of the I Battalion and Giuseppe Garibaldi's Redshirts during the Battle of the Volturno

In 1860 the three battalions participated in the Sardinian campaign in central and southern Italy, during which the IX Battalion's 35th Company distinguished itself during the storming of the fortress of Spoleto. For this the company was awarded a Bronze Medal of Military Valor, which was affixed to the flag of the 1st Bersaglieri Regiment and added to the regiment's coat of arms, when the battalion joined the regiment. On 2 October 1860, the I Battalion fought with Giuseppe Garibaldi's Redshirts in the Battle of the Volturno against the troops of the Kingdom of the Two Sicilies. In 1861, after the conquest of Southern Italy, the VII Battalion was awarded Bronze Medal of Military Valor for its conduct during the campaign. The same year the IX Battalion was awarded Bronze Medal of Military Valor for having suppressed the anti-Sardinian revolt in Abruzzo after region had been annexed, along with the rest of the Kingdom of Two Sicilies, by the Kingdom of Sardinia. Both medals were affixed to the flag of the 1st Bersaglieri Regiment and added to the regiment's coat of arms, when the two battalions joined the regiment.

In 1866 the battalions participated in the Third Italian War of Independence, during which the battalions fought in the Battle of Custoza and at Borgoforte. In 1887-88 the regiment's 6th Company was deployed to Eritrea for the Italo-Ethiopian War of 1887–1889. In 1895-96 the regiment provided 12 officers and 274 troops to augment units fighting in the First Italo-Ethiopian War. On 1 October 1910 the regiment's depot in San Remo formed the I Cyclists Battalion. In 1911, the regiment provided 4 officers and 454 troops to augment units fighting in the Italo-Turkish War.

=== World War I ===
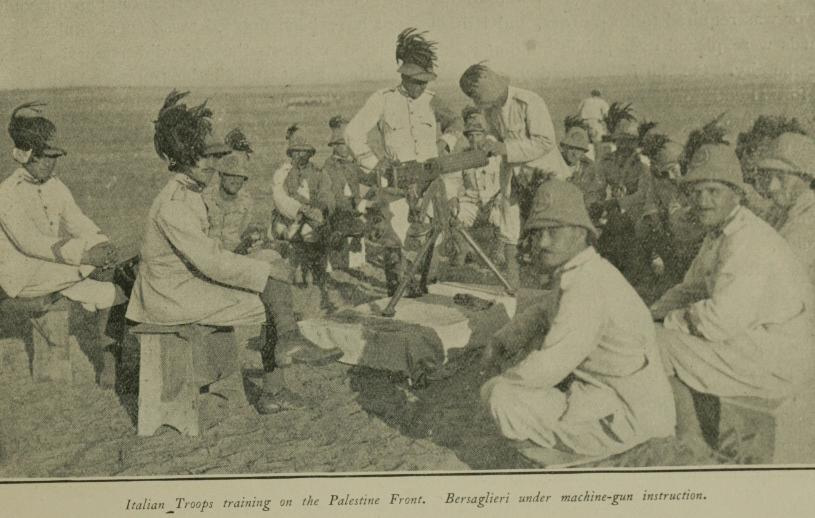
Troops of the 1st Bersaglieri Regiment in the Sinai Peninsula in 1917

At the outbreak of World War I the regiment consisted of the I, VII, and IX battalions and the I Cyclists Battalion, which operated as an autonomous unit throughout the war. On 5 January 1915 the depot of the 1st Bersaglieri Regiment in Naples formed the LV Battalion, which operated as an autonomous unit. On 19 May 1915 the entire regiment, including the LV Battalion, but not the I Cyclists Battalion, was sent to Italian Libya on occupation duty. While the regiment landed in Tripolis, the LV Battalion disembarked in Misrata. On 24 February 1916, the regiment's command returned to Italy and its three battalions became autonomous units. On 23 April 1917 the three battalions formed a provisional company of 300 men for the Italian Palestine Detachment, which also included with 100 Carabinieri. The Italian troops arrived on 19 May 1917 in Port Said in Egypt and fought in the Sinai and Palestine campaign. During the Third Battle of Gaza the Italian Detachment was assigned to the division-sized Composite Force and defended the allied position at Khan Yunis.

On 27 April 1917 the regiment's depot in Naples formed the regimental command of the 21st Bersaglieri Regiment. The new regiment received three replacement battalions, which had been formed earlier by the depot of the 1st Bersaglieri Regiment. Upon entering the regiment the three battalions were renumbered as LXXIII, LXXIV, and LXXV battalions. On 15 May 1918 the I, VII, and IX battalions returned to Italy, followed by the LV Battalion, which left Libya on 31 May. Initially the 1st Bersaglieri Regiment was reformed as a complete unit, but already on 24 June, the day the Austro-Hungarian Army commenced the Second Battle of the Piave River, the regiment's battalions became autonomous again and were assigned to the 1st Assault Division, which also included Arditi battalions. Likewise the LV Battalion was assigned to the 2nd Assault Division.

For the Battle of Vittorio Veneto the 1st Assault Division was given the task to force the Piave river and create a bridgehead on the Northern shore between the villages of Moriago and Sernaglia. The battle commenced on 24 October 1918 and on 27 October the 1st Assault Division crossed the Piave. Initially the division made good progress, reaching as far as Falzè di Piave, before Austro-Hungarian counterattacks forced the division back to Moriago and Fontigo, but by then the Austrian-Hungarian lines had already been breached and by 30 October the division was on the move to Vittorio Veneto.

The I Cyclists Battalion fought in 1915 in the First Battle of the Isonzo at Fogliano, and then during the Third Battle of the Isonzo at San Martino del Carso. On 15 May 1916, Austro-Hungary commenced the Battle of Asiago. Four days later the battalion was transferred as reinforcements to the Asiago plateau. In the following days the battalion suffered 206 casualties. On 17 June 1916, the battalion was taken out of the front and disbanded the following day, with the remaining personnel assigned to the 14th Bersaglieri Regiment. On 12 July 1916, the I Cyclists Battalion was reformed. In October 1916 the battalion was deployed on Monte Pasubio. On 9 October the battalion attempted to conquer the Coston di Lora and the next day carried out attacks on the Alpe di Cosmagnon, for these actions, the battalion was awarded a Bronze Medal of Military Valor, which was affixed to the flag of the 1st Bersaglieri Regiment and added to the regiment's coat of arms.

In spring 1917 the battalion was transferred back to the Izono front for the Tenth Battle of the Isonzo, during which the battalion fought at Opatje Selo. After the Battle of Caporetto the battalion fought delaying actions at Lestans and then Sequals and then retreated, along with the remainder of the Italian armies, behind the Piave river. In June 1918, the battalion fought during the Second Battle of the Piave River at Losson and then was tasked with liberating Capo d'Argine. However the battalion advanced past Capo d'Argine and reached the Piave river at Croce. During the Battle of Vittorio Veneto the battalion was assigned to the VII Cavalry Brigade, with which it pursued the fleeing enemy to San Odorico.

=== Interwar years ===
After the war the LV Battalion was disbanded on 28 February 1919 and the same month the I, VII, and IX the Bersaglieri battalions left the 1st Assault Division and returned to Libya. In March 1919, the I Cyclists Battalion was disbanded. In July 1919 the I, VII, and IX battalions returned from Libya to Naples and the regiment was reformed. In 1920 the VII and IX battalions were reduced to reserve units, with the latter battalion being disbanded soon thereafter. On 30 April 1923 the VII Battalion was reformed. In July 1924 the regiment became a cyclists unit. By 1926 the regiment consisted of the I and VII battalions, and a depot. In 1935-36 16 officers and 215 troops of the regiment were assigned to other units for the Second Italo-Ethiopian War. In 1936 the regiment lost its role as cyclists unit. On 7 April 1939 the I Battalion participated in the Invasion of Albania. In 1939 the IX Battalion was reformed and the regiment formed a motorcyclists company.

=== World War II ===
At the outbreak of World War II the consisted of the following units:

- 1st Bersaglieri Regiment
  - Command Company
  - I Battalion
  - VII Battalion
  - IX Battalion
  - 1st Motorcyclists Company
  - 1st Cannons Company, with 47/32 mod. 35 anti-tank guns

On 10 November 1940 the regiment was sent to Albania to fight in the Greco-Italian War. In Albania the I Battalion was attached to the 3rd Alpine Division "Julia" and the VII Battalion to the 47th Infantry Division "Bari", while the IX Battalion guarded the frontier with Yugoslavia. On 29 November the regimental command and IX Battalion were tasked with defending the front near Pogradec on the shores of Lake Ohrid. From 29 November 1940 to 28 February 1941 the regiment and IX Battalion held the frontline, for which the regiment was awarded a Silver Medal of Military Valor, which was affixed to the regiment's flag and added to the regiment's coat of arms.

On 28 February the regiment left the frontline and was reunited with all its battalions. In early March the regiment moved to Shkodër in Northern Albania. On 6 April 1941 Axis forces commenced the Invasion of Yugoslavia and the 1st Bersaglieri Regiment defended the border against Yugoslav forces at Bozaj until the regiment went on the offensive on 15 April. On 17 April the regiment occupied Dubrovnik. On 24 June 1941 the regiment returned to Naples. For its conduct during the invasion of Yugoslavia the regiment was awarded its second Silver Medal of Military Valor, which was affixed to the regiment's flag and added to the regiment's coat of arms.

In August 1942 the regiment was transferred to Piedmont and in November of the same year the regiment participated in the Case Anton occupation of Vichy France. The regiment then remained in the area of Draguignan on occupation and coastal defense duty. On 8 September 1943, the day the Armistice of Cassibile was announced, the regiment was again in Piedmont, where invading German forces overcame and disbanded it.

=== Cold War ===
On 1 April 1951, the I Battalion was reformed in Rome. On 1 January 1953, the 1st Bersaglieri Regiment and the VII Battalion were reformed in Rome, and the I Battalion entered the reformed regiment. On the same day the regiment joined the Armored Division "Pozzuolo del Friuli". On 1 March 1954, the IX Battalion was reformed. At the time the regiment's three battalions were equipped with M3 Half-tracks. In 1955 the regiment moved from Rome to Viterbo. In 1958 the Italian Army disbanded the Armored Division "Pozzuolo del Friuli" and consequently the 1st Bersaglieri Regiment moved from Viterbo to Civitavecchia, where it took over the base of the 4th Armored Infantry Regiment and was reorganized: on 30 April 1958, the IX Battalion was redesignated IX Bersaglieri Battalion and the next day, on 1 May 1958, the battalion was transferred to the 4th Armored Infantry Regiment, which in turn transferred its I and III tank battalions to the 1st Bersaglieri Regiment. Afterwards the 4th Armored Infantry Regiment moved from Civitavecchia to Legnano. On 1 December of the same year, the 1st Bersaglieri Regiment transferred the I Bersaglieri Battalion and III Tank Battalion to the 182nd Armored Infantry Regiment "Garibaldi". On 31 December 1958, the Armored Division "Pozzuolo del Friuli" was disbanded and the next day the 1st Bersaglieri Regiment was renamed 1st Armored Bersaglieri Regiment and joined the Infantry Division "Granatieri di Sardegna".

In January 1959, the I Tank Battalion was renumbered IX Tank Battalion. On 11 April 1961 the I Bersaglieri Battalion of the 182nd Armored Infantry Regiment "Garibaldi" was renumbered XXIII Bersaglieri Battalion and consequently on 24 May 1961 the VII Bersaglieri Battalion was renumbered I Bersaglieri Battalion. On the same date the IX Tank Battalion was renumbered XVIII Tank Battalion. On 1 September 1964, the 1st Armored Bersaglieri Regiment was transferred from the Infantry Division "Granatieri di Sardegna" to the II Armored Brigade "Centauro" of the Armored Division "Centauro". On the same day the regiment received the reformed VI Tank Battalion. Afterwards the II Armored Brigade "Centauro" consisted of the following units:

- II Armored Brigade "Centauro", in Civitavecchia
  - 1st Armored Bersaglieri Regiment, in Civitavecchia
    - I Bersaglieri Battalion, with M113 armored personnel carriers
    - VI Tank Battalion, with M47 Patton main battle tanks
    - XVIII Tank Battalion, with M47 Patton main battle tanks
  - II Group/ 131st Armored Artillery Regiment, with M7 Priest self-propelled howitzers
  - II Service Battalion
  - 2nd Engineer Company
  - 2nd Signal Company

On 1 October 1968, the brigade headquarters were disbanded and the 1st Armored Bersaglieri Regiment came under direct command of the Armored Division "Centauro". On 10 December 1974 the XVIII Tank Battalion was reduced to a reserve unit and on 1 June 1975 it was disbanded.

During the 1975 army reform the army disbanded the regimental level and newly independent battalions were granted for the first time their own flags. On 1 August 1975 the 1st Armored Bersaglieri Regiment returned to the Infantry Division "Granatieri di Sardegna". On 31 October 1976 the 1st Armored Bersaglieri Regiment was disbanded and the next day the regiment's I Bersaglieri Battalion in Civitavecchia became an autonomous unit and was renamed 1st Bersaglieri Battalion "La Marmora". The battalion was named for Alessandro Ferrero La Marmora, who in 1835, while serving as captain in the Royal Sardinian Army, gave the impetus to form the 1st Bersaglieri Company and is therefore considered as the founder of the Bersaglieri speciality. On the same day the regiment's VI Tank Battalion became an autonomous unit and was renamed 6th Tank Battalion "M.O. Scapuzzi". The two battalions were assigned to the Mechanized Brigade "Granatieri di Sardegna", which was formed on the same day by contracting the Infantry Division "Granatieri di Sardegna". The Bersaglieri battalion consisted now of a command, a command and services company, three mechanized companies with M113 armored personnel carriers, and a heavy mortar company with M106 mortar carriers with 120mm Mod. 63 mortars. The Bersaglieri battalion fielded now 896 men (45 officers, 100 non-commissioned officers, and 751 soldiers).

On 12 November 1976 the President of the Italian Republic Giovanni Leone assigned with decree 846 the flag and traditions of the 1st Bersaglieri Regiment to the 1st Bersaglieri Battalion "La Marmora".

=== Recent times ===
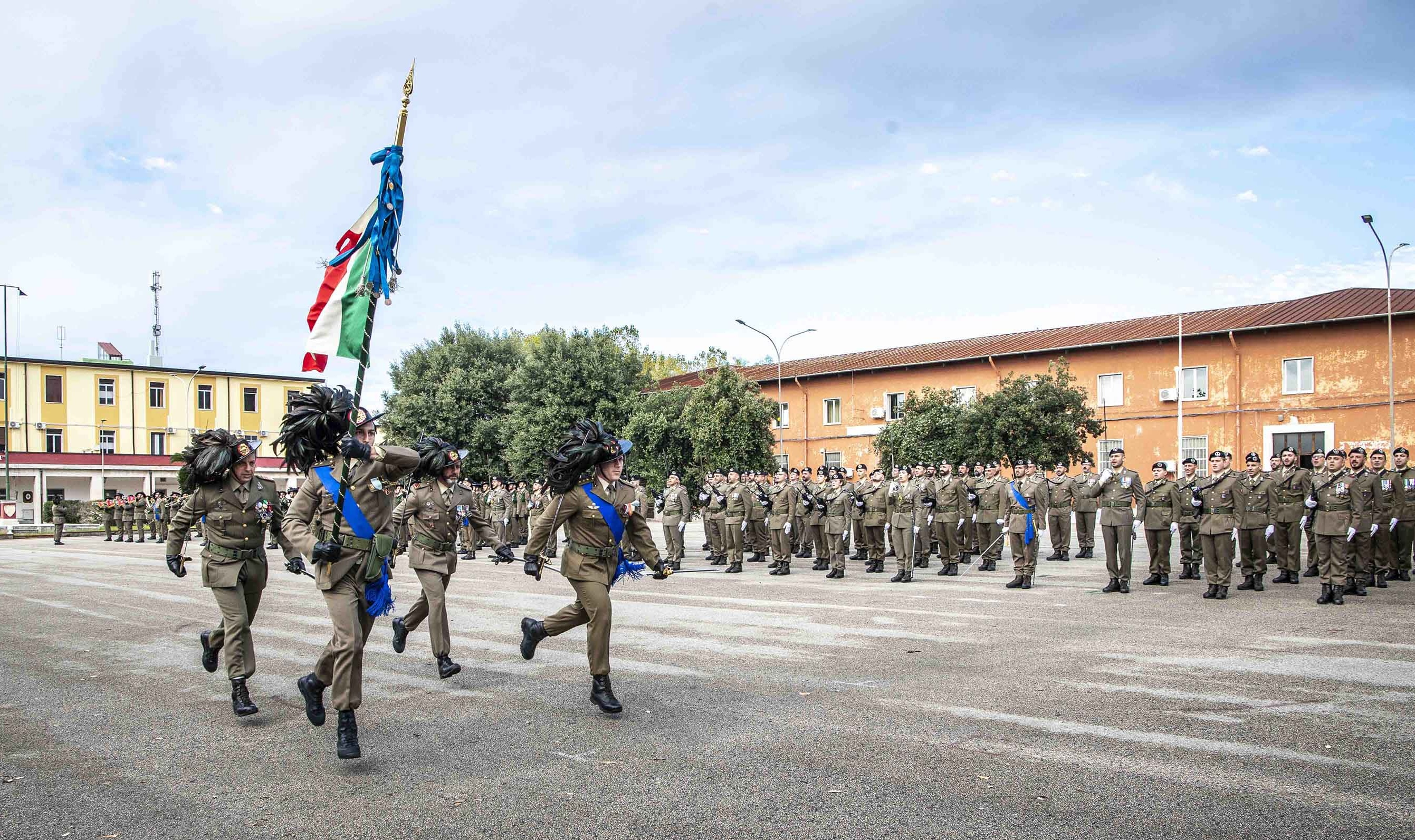
1st Bersaglieri Regiment flag on parade during a change of command ceremony in 2024

On 18 September 1995, the 1st Bersaglieri Battalion "La Marmora" lost its autonomy and the next day the battalion entered the reformed 1st Bersaglieri Regiment. Due to the drawdown of forces after the end of the Cold War the regiment's was continuously reduced until in 2000 the regiment's flag was transferred to the office of the commander of the Mechanized Brigade "Granatieri di Sardegna" for safekeeping. On 1 January 2005 the 18th Bersaglieri Regiment in Cosenza was renamed 1st Bersaglieri Regiment. On 22 February of the same year the flag of the 1st Bersaglieri Regiment arrived in Cosenza, where it replaced on the same date the flag of the 18th Bersaglieri Regiment, which was consequently transferred to the Shrine of the Flags in the Vittoriano in Rome.

On 15 June 2006 the regiment deployed to Nasiriyah in Iraq. Taking up garrison and peacekeeping duties in the city the regiment found itself soon embroiled in the Iraqi insurgency. On 2 December 2006 the regiment left Iraq and returned to Italy. For its conduct in Iraq the regiment was awarded a Military Order of Italy, which was affixed to the regiment's flag.

== Organization ==
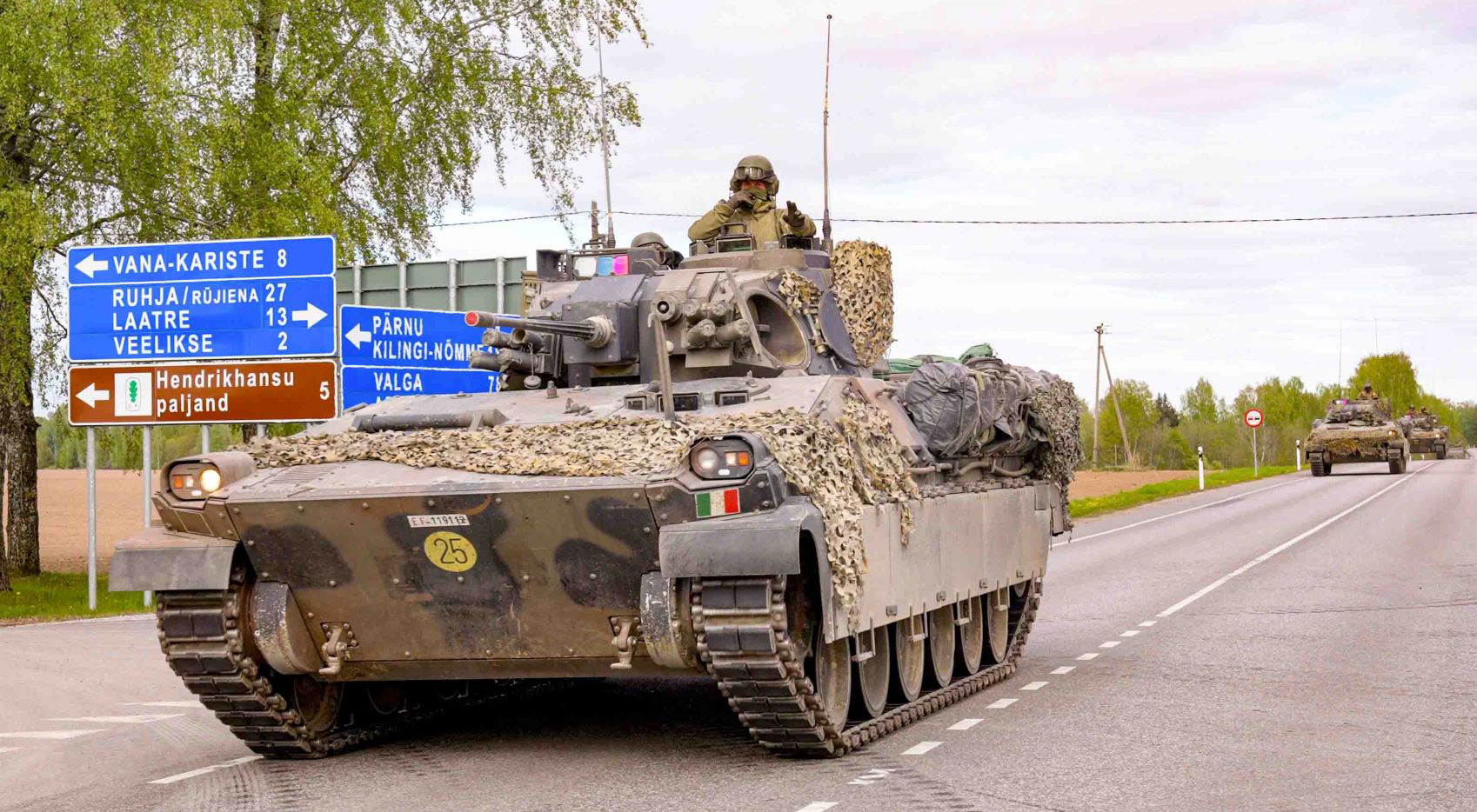
1st Bersaglieri Regiment Dardo IFV in Estonia during exercise Spring Storm 2024

As of 2024 the 1st Bersaglieri Regiment is organized as follows:

- 1st Bersaglieri Regiment, in Cosenza
  - Command and Logistic Support Company
  - 1st Bersaglieri Battalion "La Marmora"
    - 1st Bersaglieri Company
    - 2nd Bersaglieri Company
    - 3rd Bersaglieri Company
    - Maneuver Support Company

The regiment is equipped with tracked Dardo infantry fighting vehicles. The Maneuver Support Company is equipped with M106 120mm mortar carriers and Dardo IFVs with Spike LR anti-tank guided missiles.

== See also ==
- Bersaglieri
