= 131st Engineer Battalion "Ticino" =

Inactive Italian Army engineer unit

- 131° Battaglione Genio Pionieri "Ticino"
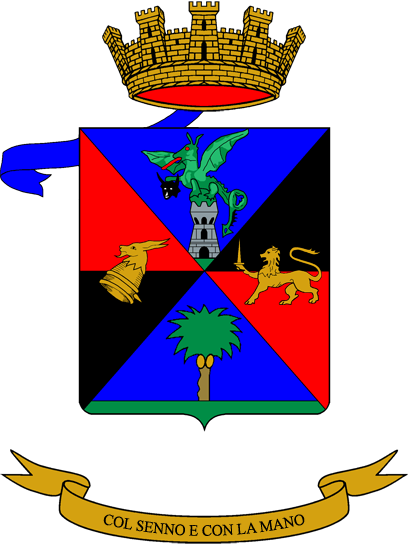
- Battalion coat of arms
- Active: 30 Sept. 1926 — 14 Sept. 1943; 1944 — 1945; 21 Oct. 1975 — 10 June 1993
- Country: Italy
- Branch: Italian Army
- Role: Combat engineers
- Part of: 3rd Army Corps
- Garrison/HQ: Novara
- Motto(s): "Col senno e con la mano"
- Anniversaries: 24 June 1918 - Second Battle of the Piave River
- Decorations: 1× Bronze Medal of Military Valor; 1× Bronze Medal of Civil Merit

Insignia
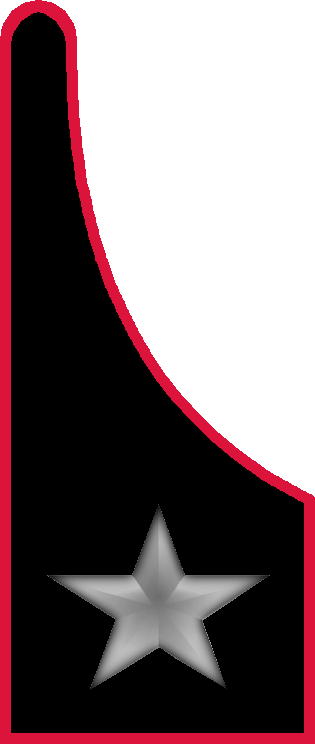
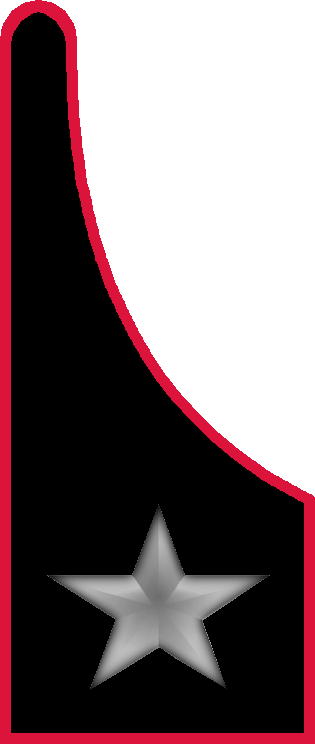
- Engineers gorget patches

The 131st Engineer Battalion "Ticino" (Italian: 131° Battaglione Genio Pionieri "Ticino") is an inactive military engineering unit of the Italian Army last based in Novara in Piedmont. The battalion was formed in 1958 and assigned to the Armored Division "Centauro". In 1975, the battalion was named for the Ticino river and received the number 131st, which had been used by the 131st Engineer Company that served with the 131st Armored Division "Centauro" during the Tunisian campaign in World War II. With the name and number the battalion was also assigned the flag and traditions of the 9th Engineer Regiment, which had been active between 1926 and 1943. In 1986, the Armored Division "Centauro" was disbanded and the battalion was assigned to the 3rd Army Corps. In 1993, the battalion was disbanded and part of its personnel joined the 10th Engineer Regiment. The battalion's anniversary falls, as for all engineer units, on 24 June 1918, the last day of the Second Battle of the Piave River.

== History ==
=== Interwar years ===
On 1 October 1922, the Royal Italian Army formed the 9th Army Corps Engineer Grouping in Trani. The grouping received a Sappers Battalion and a Telegraphers Battalion, which had been formed on 1 April 1920 for the XI Army Corps. On the same date, 1 October 1922, the XI Army Corps was renumbered as IX Army Corps. The grouping also received a miners company from the disbanded Miners Engineer Regiment. After its formation the grouping consisted of a command, a sappers-miners battalion, a telegraphers battalion, which included three dovecotes located in Brindisi, Ancona, and Taranto, a photo-electricians company, and a depot. On 30 September 1926, the grouping was renamed 9th Engineer Regiment. On 28 October 1932, the regiment received the 9th Company/ V Battalion of the disbanded 1st Radio-Telegraphers Regiment.

In March 1935, in preparation for the Second Italo-Ethiopian War, the regiment mobilized a Mixed Engineer Company, the 60th Sappers Company, and the 24th Connections Company. In August 1936, the latter two companies were repatriated and disbanded upon their arrival in Italy, while the Mixed Engineer Company remained in Massawa in Eritrea. At the end of 1936, the regiment consisted of a command, an engineer battalion, a telegraphers battalion, which included two dovecotes located in Brindisi and Taranto, a depot, and the Mixed Engineer Company in Massawa. In January 1937, the telegraphers and radio-telegraphers battalions were renamed connections battalions. On 21 October 1937, the regiment's depot formed the command of the 21st Engineer Regiment, which was intended to serve in Libya with the XXI Army Corps.

=== World War II ===
During World War II the regiment's depot in Trani mobilized the following units:

- VIII Army Corps Engineer Battalion (for the XVI Army Corps)
- XXIII Army Corps Mixed Engineer Battalion
- XXVI Engineer Battalion
- XXXVI Mixed Connections Battalion
- CCI Mixed Engineer Battalion (for the 1st CC.NN. Division "23 Marzo")
- 22nd, 23rd, and 34th mobile dovecotes
- and many smaller units

The XXVI Engineer Battalion fought on the Eastern Front and was awarded a Bronze Medal of Military Valor for its conduct and sacrifice. In the evening of 8 September 1943, the Armistice of Cassibile, which ended hostilities between the Kingdom of Italy and the Anglo-American Allies, was announced by General Dwight D. Eisenhower on Radio Algiers and by Marshal Pietro Badoglio on Italian radio. Germany reacted by invading Italy and the 9th Engineer Regiment was disbanded on 14 September 1943 by German forces. In 1944, the Italian Co-Belligerent Army reformed the 9th Engineer Regiment as a training center for its engineer troops. In 1945, after the war had ended, the regiment was once more disbanded.

==== 131st Engineer Company ====
On 5 June 1936, a Mixed Engineer Platoon was formed for the I Motor-mechanized Brigade. On 15 July 1937, the platon was expanded to Mixed Engineer Company and on the same day the I Motor-mechanized Brigade was renamed I Armored Brigade. On 20 April 1939, the brigade was reorganized and renamed 131st Armored Division "Centauro". On the same day, the Mixed Engineer Company was renamed 131st Mixed Engineer Company. The personnel of the company was trained by the 7th Engineer Regiment in Florence. In 1940, the 131st Armored Division "Centauro" fought in the Greco-Italian War and in 1941 in the Invasion of Yugoslavia. In October 1942, the division was transferred to Libya to reinforce the Panzer Army Africa fighting in the Western Desert campaign. The division did not participate in the Second Battle of El Alamein and the division's first units reached the front in late 1942, during the Axis retreat from Egypt.

In early 1943, the 131st Mixed Engineer Company was split to form the 131st Engineer Company and the 231st Connections Company, which both entered the newly formed XXXI Mixed Engineer Battalion. In 1943, the "Centauro" division fought in the Tunisian campaign, during which the division was severely decimated in the Battle of El Guettar. On 7 April 1943, the division's remaining personnel was assigned to the 16th Infantry Division "Pistoia" and, on 18 April 1943, the "Centauro" division was declared lost due to wartime events.

=== Cold War ===
On 1 April 1951, the Italian Army formed the Armored Brigade "Centauro" in Verona. One year later, on 1 May 1952, an engineer company was formed for the brigade. On 1 November of the same year, the brigade was reorganized and renamed Armored Division "Centauro". On 1 April 1958, the engineer company joined the newly formed Engineer Battalion "Centauro" in Bellinzago Novarese. The newly formed battalion consisted of a command, a command platoon, and an engineer company. In November 1963, the battalion expanded its command platoon to Command and Park Company, and formed the 2nd Engineer Company.

In 1963, the Italian Army reorganized its armored divisions along NATO standards and added a brigade level to the divisions' organization. As part of the reorganization the Engineer Battalion "Centauro" formed a mechanized engineer company for each of the "Centauro" division's three brigades. On 30 September 1968, the three brigade headquarters were disbanded and the next day, on 1 October 1968, the brigades' mechanized engineer companies returned to the Engineer Battalion "Centauro", which renumbered them as 3rd Engineer Company, 4th Engineer Company, and 5th Engineer Company. In November 1968, the battalion was deployed in the Province of Vercelli to help rescue efforts after heavy floods had devastated the area. For its work in Vercelli the battalion was awarded a Bronze Medal of Civil Merit. In 1973, the battalion moved from Bellinzago Novarese to Novara.

During the 1975 army reform the army disbanded the regimental level and newly independent battalions were granted for the first time their own flags. During the reform engineer battalions were named for a lake, if they supported an corps-level command, or a river, if they supported a division or brigade. On 1 August 1975, the 4th Engineer Company was transferred to the Engineer Battalion "Granatieri di Sardegna" of the Infantry Division "Granatieri di Sardegna". On 21 October 1975, the Armored Division "Centauro" was reorganized and the 3rd Mechanized Brigade "Goito" and 31st Armored Brigade "Curtatone" were formed with the division's units. On the same day, the Engineer Battalion "Centauro" was renamed 131st Engineer Battalion "Ticino". The battalion was named for the Ticino river, which flows near Novara. Also on the same day, the "Ticino" battalion transferred the 5th and 6th engineer companies, which had been formed during the 1963 reform, to the two new brigades. After the reform the 131st Engineer Battalion "Ticino" consisted of a command, a command and park company, and two engineer companies. At the time the battalion fielded 527 men (30 officers, 68 non-commissioned officers, and 429 soldiers).

On 12 November 1976, the President of the Italian Republic Giovanni Leone assigned with decree 846 the flag and traditions of the 9th Engineer Regiment to the battalion. The battalion also received the traditions of all engineer units, which had served with the "Centauro" divisions.

In 1986, the Armored Division "Centauro" was disbanded. Consequently, on 1 August 1986, the battalion was renamed 131st Sappers Battalion "Ticino" and, on 1 November 1986, the battalion was transferred to the 3rd Army Corps' Engineer Command. On 10 January 1987, the battalion formed a third sappers company, and on 22 January of the same year, the Command and Park Company split into a Command and Services Company and a Special Equipment Company. Afterwards the battalion consisted of the following units:

- 131st Sappers Battalion "Ticino", in Novara
  - Command and Services Company
  - 1st Sappers Company
  - 2nd Sappers Company
  - 3rd Sappers Company
  - Special Equipment Company

=== Recent times ===
On 6 June 1993, the 131st Sappers Battalion "Ticino" transferred the flag of the 9th Engineer Regiment to the Shrine of the Flags in the Vittoriano in Rome for safekeeping. Four days later, on 10 June 1993, the battalion was disbanded and part of its personnel joined the 3rd Engineer Battalion "Lario".
