= 4th Tank Battalion "M.O. Passalacqua" =

Inactive Italian Army tank unit

- 4° Battaglione Carri "M.O. Passalacqua"
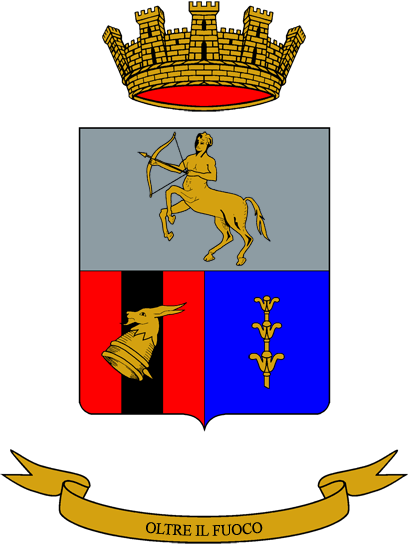
- Battalion coat of arms
- Active: 8 Oct. 1940 — 8 Dec. 1942; 1 Feb. 1959 — 27 Aug. 1992
- Country: Italy
- Branch: Italian Army
- Part of: Mechanized Brigade "Legnano"
- Garrison/HQ: Solbiate Olona
- Motto(s): "Oltre il fuoco"
- Anniversaries: 1 October 1927

Insignia
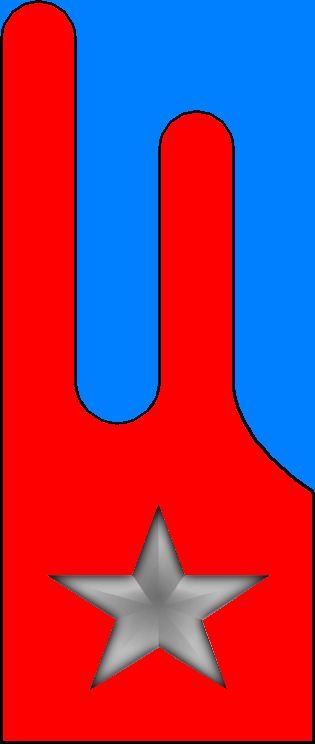
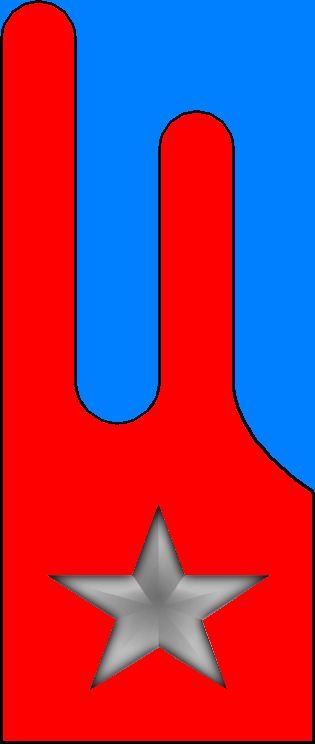
- Tank units gorget patches

The 4th Tank Battalion "M.O. Passalacqua" (Italian: 4° Battaglione Carri "M.O. Passalacqua") is an inactive tank battalion of the Italian Army, which was based in Solbiate Olona in Lombardy and last operationally assigned to the Mechanized Brigade "Legnano". The unit's lineage traces back to the World War II IV Tank Battalion M13/40, which was formed in October 1940 by the depot of the 32nd Tank Infantry Regiment and attached to the 131st Armored Division "Centauro" for the Greco-Italian War. In April 1942, the battalion was transferred to the 133rd Tank Infantry Regiment, with which it deployed to Libya for the Western Desert campaign. In November 1942, the regiment and battalion were destroyed during the Second Battle of El Alamein. In 1959, the battalion was reformed and assigned to the 31st Tank Regiment. In 1963, the battalion was transferred to the 3rd Bersaglieri Regiment. In 1975, the battalion was renamed 4th Tank Battalion "M.O. Passalacqua". In 1992, the battalion was disbanded and its personnel used to form the 67th Armored Infantry Regiment "Legnano".

Originally the unit, like all Italian tank units, was part of the army's infantry arm, but on 1 June 1999 the tankers specialty was transferred from the infantry arm to the cavalry arm. The battalion's anniversary falls, as for all tank units, which have not yet distinguished themselves in the battle, on 1 October 1927, the day the tankers speciality was founded.

== History ==
=== World War II ===
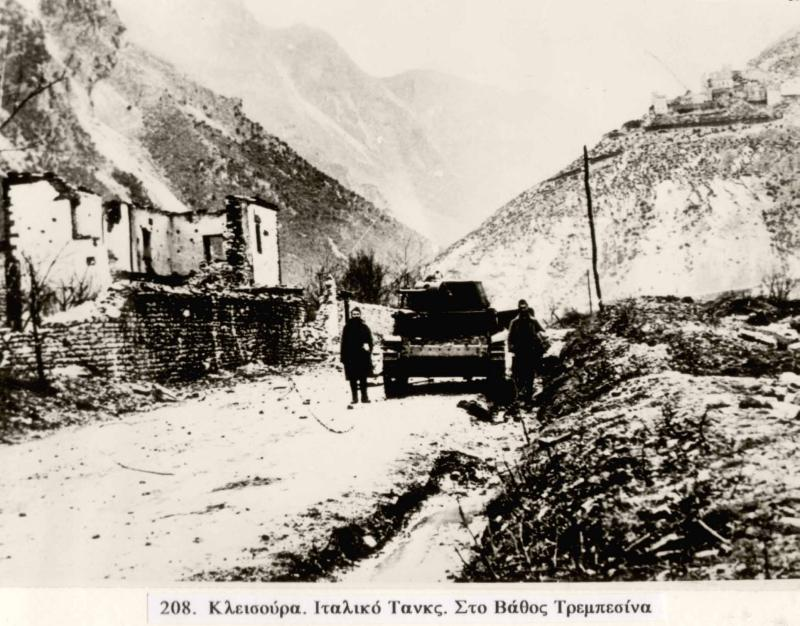
Italian M13/40 tank captured by Greek forces at Klisura Pass

On 8 October 1940, the depot of the 32nd Tank Infantry Regiment formed the IV Tank Battalion M13/40 (with M standing for Italian: "Medio" or Medium). The battalion was equipped with M13/40 tanks. Initially the battalion was intended to deploy to Libya for the Western Desert campaign, but the deteriorating situation on the Greco-Italian front forced the General Staff to send the battalion to Albania. In January 1942, the battalion arrived at the front, where it was attached to the 131st Armored Division "Centauro". The battalion fought in the area of Klisura Pass and then in the Battle of Hill 731. In late March 1941, the Centauro division moved, in preparation for the invasion of Yugoslavia, to Shkodër in northern Albania. On 6 April 1941, the invasion began and the Centauro, together with the 18th Infantry Division "Messina" and 32nd Infantry Division "Marche", defeated a Yugoslav counterattack towards Shkodër. On 15 April 1941, the division defeated another Yugoslav attack near Koplik, and the next day, on 16 April, the division crossed into Yugoslavia north of Koplik and advanced to Kotor, Cetinje and Podgorica. On 17 April 1941, the Centauro reached Trebinje, where it met up with units of the 133rd Armored Division "Littorio", which had advanced southward from Istria. On 11 May 1941, the Centauro began the return transfer to its bases in Tuscany and the IV Tank Battalion M13/40 was assigned to the division's 31st Tank Infantry Regiment. Over the next months the battalion replaced its M13/40 tanks with M14/41 tanks and changed its name to IV Tank Battalion M14/41.

On 21 April 1942, the IV Tank Battalion M14/41 was sent to Libya, where it was assigned to the 133rd Tank Infantry Regiment. On 20 June 1942, the regiment had its baptism of fire during the Axis capture of Tobruk. The regiment then fought in the Battle of Mersa Matruh, First Battle of El Alamein, and Battle of Alam el Halfa. On 23 October 1942, the Second Battle of El Alamein commenced, during which the 101st Motorized Division "Trieste", 132nd Armored Division "Ariete", and 133rd Armored Division "Littorio" were destroyed on 4 November by an attack of the British 1st Armoured Division, 7th Armoured Division and 10th Armoured Division. On 8 December 1942, the 133rd Tank Infantry Regiment and its battalions were declared as lost due to wartime events.

The few survivors of the 132nd Tank Infantry Regiment, 133rd Tank Infantry Regiment, and XI Tank Battalion M13/40 of the 101st Motorized Division "Trieste" were grouped together in the "Cantaluppi" Group, an ad hoc formation commanded by Colonel Gaetano Cantaluppi. On 5 December 1942, the group was reorganized as 132nd Anti-tank Regiment. The regiment was assigned to the 131st Armored Division "Centauro", with which it fought in the Tunisian campaign. The regiment was declared lost due to wartime events on 18 April 1943 after the Battle of El Guettar.

=== Cold War ===
On 1 February 1959, the III Tank Battalion of the 31st Tank Regiment of the Armored Division "Centauro" was renumbered as IV Tank Battalion. The battalion was based in Solbiate Olona and equipped with M47 Patton tanks. In 1963, the Armored Division "Centauro" adapted its organization to NATO standards and added a brigade level to the division's organization. On 1 November 1963, the I Mechanized Brigade "Centauro" was formed in Milan and the 3rd Bersaglieri Regiment, as well as support forces, entered the new brigade. On the same date, the XX Bersaglieri Battalion was transferred from the 3rd Bersaglieri Regiment to the 31st Tank Regiment, which in turn transferred the IV Tank Battalion to the 3rd Bersaglieri Regiment. On 1 October 1968, the brigade headquarters were disbanded, however the IV Tank Battalion and XX Bersaglieri Battalion did not return to their original regiments.

During the 1975 army reform the army disbanded the regimental level and newly independent battalions were granted for the first time their own flags, respectively in the case of cavalry units, their own standard. On 20 October 1975, the 3rd Bersaglieri Regiment was disbanded and the next day the regiment's IV Tank Battalion in Solbiate Olona was renamed 4th Tank Battalion "M.O. Passalacqua". As part of the reform tank and armored battalions were named for officers, soldiers and partisans of the tank speciality, who had served in World War II and been awarded Italy's highest military honor the Gold Medal of Military Valor. The 4th Tank Battalion was named for Lieutenant Ugo Passalacqua, who, as commanding officer of a company of the IV Tank Battalion M13/40, was gravely injured on 27 January 1941 during combat near Klisura Pass and died from his wounds at the Italian field hospital in Vlorë on 10 February 1941.

The battalion was assigned to the 3rd Mechanized Brigade "Goito" and consisted of a command, a command and services company, and three tank companies with Leopard 1A2 main battle tanks. The battalion fielded now 434 men (32 officers, 82 non-commissioned officers, and 320 soldiers). On 12 November 1976, the President of the Italian Republic Giovanni Leone granted with decree 846 the 4th Tank Battalion "M.O. Passalacqua" its flag.

=== Recent times ===
After the end of the Cold War the Italian Army began to draw down its forces and, on 1 June 1991, the 3rd Mechanized Brigade "Goito" was disbanded. On the same date, the 4th Tank Battalion "M.O. Passalacqua" was transferred to the Mechanized Brigade "Legnano". The same year the 67th Mechanized Infantry Battalion "Montelungo" moved from Monza to Solbiate Olona. On 27 August 1992, the 4th Tank Battalion "M.O. Passalacqua" and the 67th Mechanized Infantry Battalion "Montelungo" were disbanded and the next day the personnel of the two battalions formed the 67th Armored Infantry Regiment "Legnano". The regiment received the flag and traditions of the 67th Infantry Regiment "Legnano", which had been assigned to the 67th Mechanized Infantry Battalion "Montelungo" in 1976. Consequently, the flag of the 4th Tank Battalion "M.O. Passalacqua" was transferred to the Shrine of the Flags in the Vittoriano in Rome on 9 October of the same year.

== See also ==
- Mechanized Brigade "Legnano"
