= Transit Areas Management Regiment =

Active Italian Army logistics management unit

- Reggimento Gestione Aree di Transito
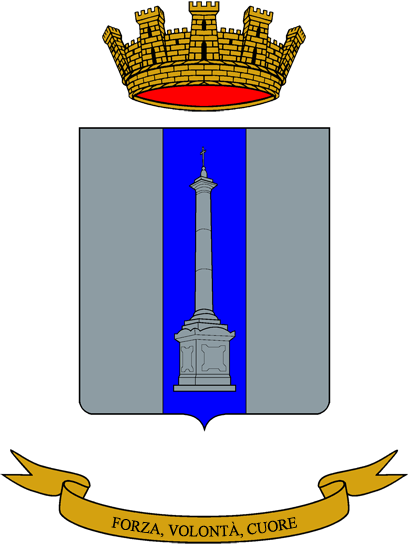
- Regimental coat of arms
- Active: 1 Jan. 1976 — today
- Country: Italy
- Branch: Italian Army
- Role: Military logistics
- Part of: Logistic Support Command
- Garrison/HQ: Bellinzago Novarese and Bari
- Motto(s): "Forza, volontà, cuore"
- Anniversaries: 22 May 1916 - Battle of Asiago

Insignia
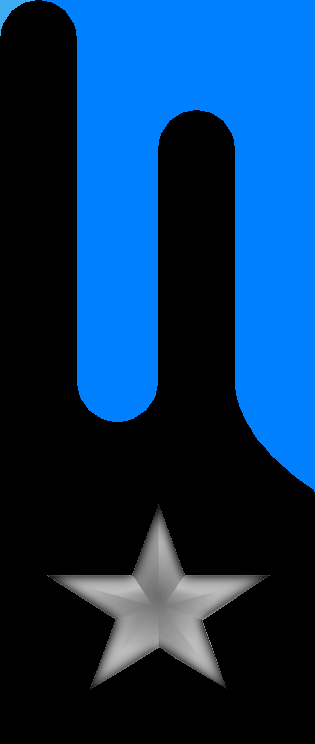
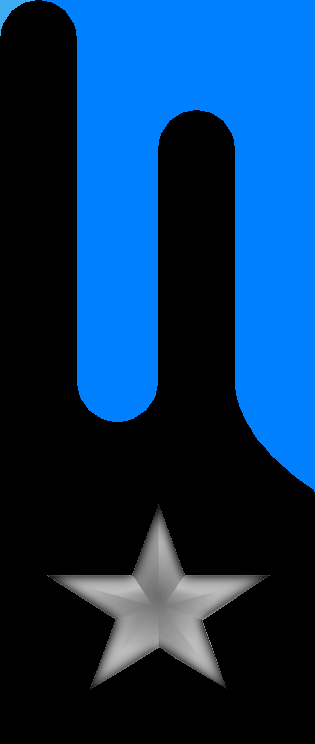
- Unit gorget patches

The Transit Areas Management Regiment (Italian: Reggimento Gestione Aree di Transito) is a military logistics regiment of the Italian Army based in Bellinzago Novarese and Bari. The regiment is operationally assigned to the Logistic Support Command and manages the reception, staging and onward movement of equipment, personnel, and materiel from Italy to Italian military operations abroad. The regiment provides, together with the 6th General Support Logistic Regiment, third line logistic support for the army's brigades and Rapid Deployable Corps – Italy. The regiment was formed on 1 January 2015 by reorganizing and expanding the 1st Transport Regiment. The regiment's anniversary falls, as for all units of the Italian Army's Transport and Materiel Corps, on 22 May, the anniversary of the Royal Italian Army's first major use of automobiles to transport reinforcements to the Asiago plateau to counter the Austro-Hungarian Asiago Offensive in May 1916.

== History ==
=== Cold War ===
In 1963, the Italian Army reorganized its armored divisions along NATO standards and added a brigade level to the divisions' organization. As part of the reorganization the Armored Division "Centauro" formed a services battalion for each of its three brigades. On 1 September 1965, the III Services Battalion "Centauro" was formed in Bellinzago Novarese and assigned to the III Armored Brigade "Centauro". The battalion consisted of a command, a command and services platoon, a Resupply, Repairs, Recovery Unit, a mixed auto section, and a reserve medical company. On 30 September 1968, the division's three brigade headquarters were disbanded and the next day, on 1 October 1968, the III Services Battalion "Centauro" was assigned to the division's Services Grouping Command "Centauro".

As part of the 1975 army reform the Armored Division "Centauro" was reorganized and on 21 October 1975 the 3rd Mechanized Brigade "Goito" and 31st Armored Brigade "Curtatone" were formed with the division's units. On 1 January 1976, III Services Battalion "Centauro" was renamed Logistic Battalion "Curtatone" and assigned to the 31st Armored Brigade "Curtatone". The battalion consisted of a command, a command platoon, a supply and transport company, a medium workshop, and a vehicle park. At the time the battalion fielded 692 men (38 officers, 85 non-commissioned officers, and 569 soldiers).

On 12 November 1976, the President of the Italian Republic Giovanni Leone granted with decree 846 the battalion a flag.

In 1981, the battalion was reorganized and consisted afterwards of the following units:

- Logistic Battalion "Curtatone", in Bellinzago Novarese
  - Command and Services Company
  - Supply Company
  - Maintenance Company
  - Medium Transport Company
  - Medical Unit (Reserve)

In 1986, the Italian Army abolished the divisional level and brigades, which until then had been under one of the Army's four divisions, came under direct command of the Army's 3rd Army Corps or 5th Army Corps. As the Armored Division "Centauro" carried the traditions of the 131st Armored Division "Centauro", which had distinguished itself in the Tunisian campaign of World War II, the army decided to retain the name of the division. On 31 October 1986, the command of the Armored Division "Centauro" in Novara was disbanded and the next day the command of the 31st Armored Brigade "Curtatone" moved from Bellinzago Novarese to Novara, where the command was renamed 31st Armored Brigade "Centauro". The "Centauro" brigade retained the Curtatone's units, which, including the Logistic Battalion "Curtatone", changed their names from "Curtatone" to "Centauro".

=== Recent times ===
For the next 15 years the Logistic Battalion "Centauro" remained with the Armored Brigade Centauro until, on 1 February 2001, the battalion was transferred to the Logistic Projection Brigade. On 24 September 2001, the battalion was reorganized and renamed 1st Transport Regiment. The regiment consisted of a command, a command and logistic support company, a transport battalion, and a movement control battalion. On 12 September 2013, the Logistic Projection Command was disbanded and the 1st Transport Regiment was assigned to the army's Logistic Support Command. In 2015, the regiment was reorganized and renamed Transit Areas Management Regiment.

== Organization ==
As of 2024 the Transit Areas Management Regiment is organized as follows:

- Transit Areas Management Regiment, in Bellinzago Novarese
  - Command and Logistic Support Company
  - Logistic Battalion
  - Logistic Battalion, in Bari
  - Movement Control Battalion
  - Movement Control Battalion, in Bari

== See also ==
- Military logistics
