= 131st Artillery Regiment "Centauro" =

Inactive Italian Army self-propelled artillery unit

- 131° Reggimento Artiglieria "Centauro"
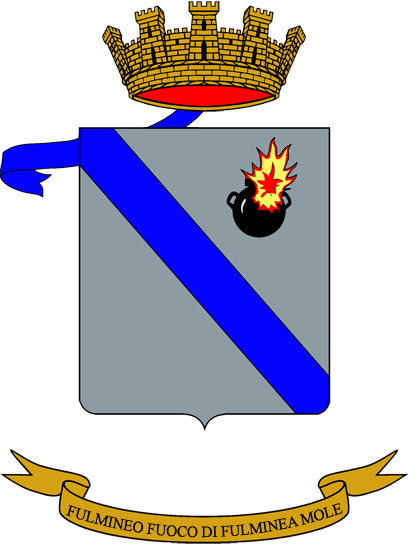
- Regimental coat of arms
- Active: 20 April 1939 - 18 April 1943; 1 May 1951 - 31 March 1993; 9 Oct. 1993 - March 2001
- Country: Italy
- Branch: Italian Army
- Type: Artillery
- Role: Field artillery
- Part of: Armored Brigade "Centauro"
- Garrison/HQ: Vercelli
- Motto(s): "Fulmineo fuoco di fulminea mole"
- Anniversaries: 15 June 1918 - Second Battle of the Piave River
- Decorations: 1x Bronze Medal of Military Valor; 2x Bronze Medals of Civil Merit

Insignia
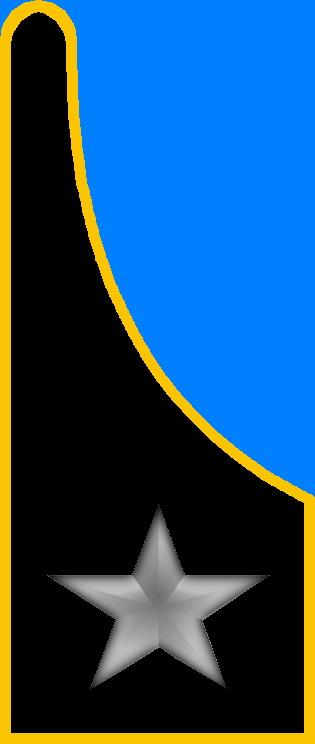
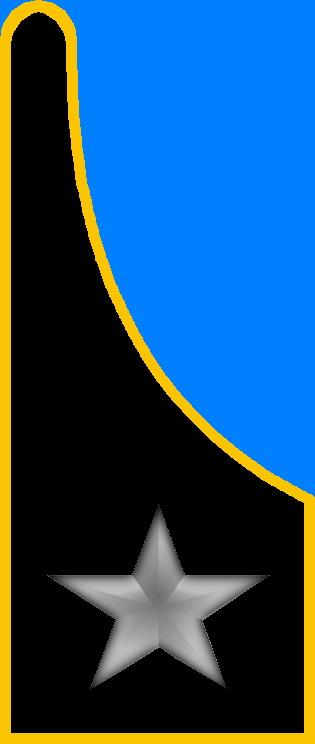
- Regimental gorget patches

The 131st Artillery Regiment "Centauro" (Italian: 131° Reggimento Artiglieria "Centauro") is an inactive field artillery regiment of the Italian Army, which was based in Vercelli in Piedmont. Originally an armored artillery regiment of the Royal Italian Army, the regiment was assigned during World War II to the 131st Armored Division "Centauro", with which the regiment fought in the Tunisian campaign. During the Cold War the regiment was assigned to the Armored Division "Centauro" and from 1986 the Armored Brigade "Centauro". The regiment was disbanded in 2001. The regimental anniversary falls, as for all Italian Army artillery regiments, on June 15, the beginning of the Second Battle of the Piave River in 1918.

== History ==
On 20 April 1939 the depot of the 3rd Army Corps Artillery Regiment in Cremona formed the 131st Armored Artillery Regiment. The regiment was assigned to the 131st Armored Division "Centauro" and consisted of a command, a command unit, the I and II groups with 75/27 mod. 11 field guns, and a depot. On 10 May 1939 the regiment arrived in Albania and participated in the last operations to annex the country. The division, which also included the 5th Bersaglieri Regiment and 31st Tank Infantry Regiment, remained in Tirana and there the regiment finished its formation. At the end of October 1940 the regiment consisted of a command, a command unit, the I, II, and III groups with 75/27 mod. 11 field guns, and two batteries with 20/65 mod. 35 anti-aircraft guns.

=== World War II ===
On 28 October 1940 the division participated in the invasion of Greece. The division fought in the Battle of Klisura Pass and then at Tepelenë. Due to the heavy losses the division was taken out of the line in February 1941 and rebuilt. In March 1940 the division participated in the invasion of Yugoslavia. In May 1941 the division returned to Italy. For its conduct in Albania and Yugoslavia the 131st Artillery Regiment "Centauro" was awarded a Bronze Medal of Military Valor, which was affixed to the regiment's flag and is depicted on the unit's coat of arms.

Over the next months the regiment changed its composition and by March 1942 it consisted of a command, a command unit, the I, and II groups with 75/27 mod. 11 field guns, the III Motorized Group with 105/28 cannons, the V and VI self-propelled groups with 75/18 self-propelled guns, and the IV Mixed Group with two batteries with 90/53 anti-aircraft guns and two batteries with 20/65 mod. 35 anti-aircraft guns. Soon afterwards the IV, V, and VI groups were renumbered as DII, DLIII, DLIV.

Already in spring 1942 the DII Mixed Group was ceded to the 132nd Artillery Regiment "Ariete" of the 132nd Armored Division "Ariete" and in August 1942 the regiment ceded DLIV Self-propelled Group to the 133rd Artillery Regiment "Littorio" of the 133rd Armored Division "Littorio". Both division fought in the Western Desert campaign and were destroyed in the Second Battle of El Alamein.

In October 1942 the Centauro division was transferred to Libya and by November 1942 the 131st Artillery Regiment "Centauro" consisted of a command, a command unit, the I and II groups with 75/27 mod. 06 field guns, the III Motorized Group with 105/28 cannons, the DLIX Self-propelled Group with 75/18 self-propelled guns, the DI Anti-aircraft Group with 90/53 anti-aircraft guns, and two batteries with 20/65 mod. 35 anti-aircraft guns.

The division's first engagement was the Battle of El Agheila. Afterwards the division retreated with Axis forces from Libya to Tunisia. During the Battle of the Kasserine Pass the Centauro overran the part of the US forces defending Highway 13. The division participated in the Battle of El Guettar, where it was severely decimated. On 18 April 1943 the Centauro was declared lost due to wartime events.

=== Cold War ===
The regiment was reformed on 1 May 1951 in Bracciano as 131st Armored Artillery Regiment. The regiment was assigned to the Armored Brigade "Centauro" and consisted of a command, a command unit, I Self-propelled Group with M7 Priest self-propelled guns, and II Anti-tank Group with M10 tank destroyers. In September 1951 the regiment moved from Bracciano to Verona. In 1952 the regiment formed a second M7 Priest equipped group and replaced the M10 tank destroyers with M36 tank destroyers. On 1 November 1952 the Armored Brigade "Centauro" was expanded to Armored Division "Centauro". In February 1953 the regiment added a third M7 Priest equipped group and a light anti-aircraft group with 40/56 autocannons.

On 1 January 1954 the regiment consisted of the following units:

- 131st Armored Artillery Regiment, in Verona
  - Command Unit
  - I Self-propelled Group with M7 Priest self-propelled guns
  - II Self-propelled Group with M7 Priest self-propelled guns
  - III Self-propelled Group with M7 Priest self-propelled guns
  - IV Anti-tank Group with M36 tank destroyers
  - V Light Anti-aircraft Group with 40/56 autocannons

In November 1955 the regiment moved from Verona to Vercelli and the IV and V were merged into a mixed group with two anti-aircraft batteries with 40/56 autocannons and one battery with M36 tank destroyers. In 1956 the regiment formed a Light Aircraft Section with L-21B artillery observation planes. In 1958 the section was expanded to Light Aircraft Unit "Centauro". On 1 September 1958 the Mixed Group was reduced to an anti-aircraft battery with 40/56 autocannons and one self-propelled battery with M44 self-propelled howitzers. In 1959 the mixed group was split and the self-propelled battery was used in April to form the IV Self-propelled Group with M44 self-propelled howitzers, while the anti-aircraft battery was used to form in June the V Light Anti-aircraft Group. On 1 March 1963 the Light Aircraft Unit "Centauro" was disbanded and the V Light Anti-aircraft Group was renumbered VI in preparation for the forming of the V Heavy Self-propelled Artillery Group.

In 1963 the Italian Army reorganized its divisions along NATO standards and added a brigade level to the divisions' structure. On 1 November 1963 the regiment consisted of a command, a command unit, the I, II and III self-propelled groups with M7 Priest self-propelled guns, the IV Heavy Self-propelled Field Group with M44 self-propelled howitzers, and the VI Light Anti-aircraft Group with 40/56 autocannons. On the same date the I Self-propelled Group was assigned to the I Mechanized Brigade "Centauro" and the III Self-propelled Group was assigned to the III Armored Brigade "Centauro".

In 1964 the regiment formed an Artillery Specialists Battery and underwent the following changes:

- 1 February: the regiment was assigned to the newly formed divisional Artillery Brigade "Centauro"
- 1 September: the III Self-propelled Group with M7 Priest self-propelled guns in Civitavecchia of the 13th Field Artillery Regiment of the Infantry Division "Granatieri di Sardegna" was transferred to the 131st Armored Artillery Regiment and renumbered II Self-propelled Group
- 1 September: the VI Light Anti-aircraft Group was placed in reserve status
- 15 October: the V Heavy Self-propelled Artillery Group with M55 self propelled howitzers was formed in Vercelli
- 1 November: and the II Self-propelled Group in Civitavecchia was assigned to the II Armored Brigade "Centauro". On the same date the II Self-propelled Group in Vercelli was transferred to the 11th Field Artillery Regiment of the Infantry Division "Legnano"

On 1 September 1968 the brigade level was abolished and the three self-propelled groups returned to the regiment, which afterwards was organized as follows:

- 131st Armored Artillery Regiment, in Vercelli
  - Command Unit
    - I Self-propelled Field Artillery Group with M7 Priest self-propelled guns
    - II Self-propelled Field Artillery Group with M7 Priest self-propelled guns, in Civitavecchia
    - III Self-propelled Field Artillery Group with M7 Priest self-propelled guns
    - IV Heavy Self-propelled Field Artillery Group with M44 self-propelled howitzers
    - V Heavy Self-propelled Artillery Group with M55 self-propelled howitzers
    - VI Light Anti-aircraft Artillery Group (Reserve) with 40/56 autocannons
    - Artillery Specialists Battery, in Vercelli

In 1972 the regiment received M109G self-propelled howitzers and by 1 January 1973 all three self-propelled field artillery groups had replaced their M7 Priest with the modern M109G.

During the 1975 army reform the army disbanded the regimental level and newly independent battalions and groups were granted for the first time their own flags. On 1 October 1975 the regiment's II Self-propelled Field Artillery Group was reorganized and renamed 13th Field Artillery Group "Magliana" and assigned to the Infantry Division "Granatieri di Sardegna". On 20 October 1975 the 131st Armored Artillery Regiment was disbanded and the next day the I Self-propelled Field Artillery Group was reorganized and renamed 131st Heavy Field Artillery Group "Vercelli". On the same date the III Self-propelled Field Artillery Group was disbanded, while the IV Heavy Self-propelled Field Artillery Group was reorganized and renamed 9th Self-propelled Field Artillery Group "Brennero" and transferred to the 31st Armored Brigade "Curtatone". Furthermore on the same date the V Heavy Self-propelled Artillery Group was reorganized and renamed 205th Heavy Field Artillery Group "Lomellina", while the regiment's Command and Services Battery and the regiment's Specialists Battery formed the Artillery Specialists Group "Centauro". The VI Light Anti-aircraft Artillery Group was disbanded and replaced by the 11th Light Anti-aircraft Artillery Group "Falco" of the 11th Field Artillery Regiment. On the same day the 131st and 205th groups, as well as the artillery specialists group and light anti-aircraft artillery group, were assigned to the Armored Division "Centauro" Artillery Command, which had been formed with the personnel of the disbanded regiment's command. To avoid confusion with the other support units of the Armored Division "Centauro" the group was named for the location of its base Vercelli. The 131st and 205th groups consisted both of a command, a command and services battery, and three batteries with M114 155mm towed howitzers.

On 12 November 1976 the President of the Italian Republic Giovanni Leone assigned with decree 846 the flag and traditions of the 131st Artillery Regiment "Centauro" to the 131st Heavy Field Artillery Group "Vercelli". At the time the group fielded 433 men (31 officers, 53 non-commissioned officers, and 349 soldiers).

In September 1981 the group was equipped with modern FH70 155mm howitzers. In 1986 the Italian Army abolished the divisional level and so on 31 October 1986 the Armored Division "Centauro" was disbanded. The next day the group was assigned to the Artillery Command of the 3rd Army Corps.

=== Recent times ===
On 16 February 1991 the group was assigned to the Horse Artillery Regiment. On 2 May of the same year the group replaced its FH70 155mm howitzers with M109G self-propelled howitzers.

On 29 July 1992 the 9th Self-propelled Field Artillery Group "Brennero" was disbanded and the next day the 131st Heavy Field Artillery Group "Vercelli" exited the Horse Artillery Regiment and entered the reformed 131st Self-propelled Field Artillery Regiment "Centauro". The reformed regiment incorporated the personnel and M109L self-propelled howitzers of the disbanded Brennero group.

On 10 October 1995 the batteries of the 52nd Self-propelled Field Artillery Regiment "Torino" in Brescia were disbanded and the flag of that regiment was transferred to Vercelli, where it supplanted the flag of the 131st Self-propelled Field Artillery Regiment "Centauro", which departed Vercelli and the next day, on 11 October 1995, supplanted the flag of the 2nd Self-propelled Field Artillery Regiment "Potenza" in Barletta. Afterwards the flag of the Potenza was transferred to the Shrine of the Flags in the Vittoriano in Rome.

On 20 May 1996 the regiment moved from Barletta to Foggia. In March 2001 the flag of the 131st Field Artillery Regiment "Centauro" was transferred to the Shrine of the Flags in the Vittoriano in Rome and supplanted in the base in Foggia by the flag of the 21st Field Artillery Regiment "Trieste".
