= 6th Bersaglieri Regiment =

Active Italian Army infantry unit

- 6° Reggimento bersaglieri
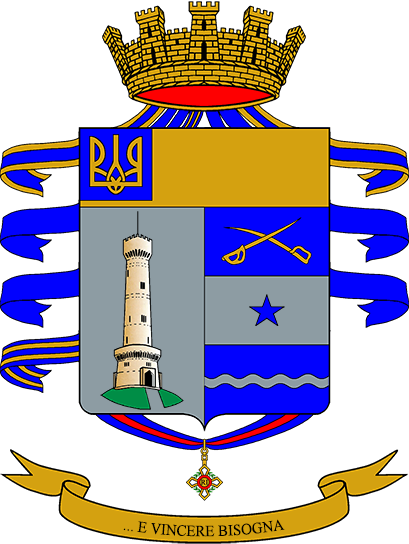
- Regimental coat of arms
- Active: 16 April 1861 — 30 Dec. 1865; 1 Jan. 1871 — 8 Sept. 1943; 30 Oct. 1975 — 31 May 1991; 16 Sept. 1992 — today
- Country: Italy
- Branch: Italian Army
- Part of: Mechanized Brigade "Aosta"
- Garrison/HQ: Trapani
- Motto: "...e vincere bisogna"
- Anniversaries: 18 June 1836
- Decorations: 2x Military Order of Italy; 2x Gold Medals of Military Valor; 4x Bronze Medals of Military Valor; 1x Silver Medal of Army Valor

Insignia
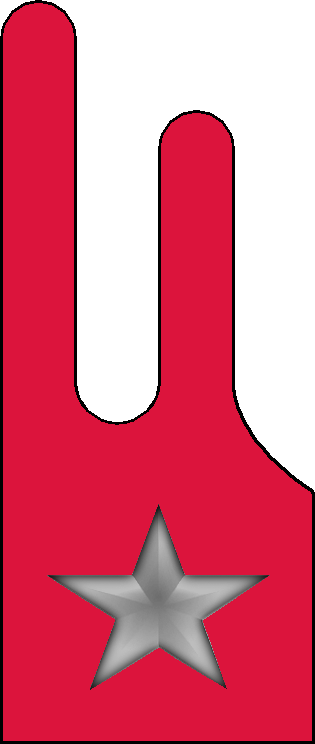
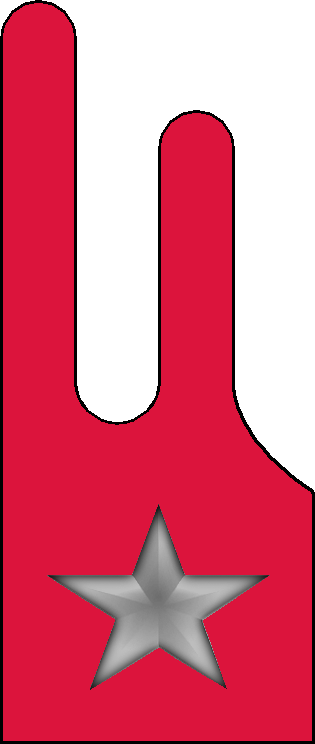
- Bersaglieri gorget patches

The 6th Bersaglieri Regiment (Italian: 6° Reggimento Bersaglieri) is an active unit of the Italian Army based in Trapani in Sicily. The regiment is part of the army's infantry corps' Bersaglieri speciality and operationally assigned to the Mechanized Brigade "Aosta". The regiment was formed in 1861 by the Royal Italian Army with preexisting battalions. During World War I the regiment formed together with the 12th Bersaglieri Regiment the I Bersaglieri Brigade, which served on the Italian front.

During World War II the regiment was assigned to the 3rd Cavalry Division "Principe Amedeo Duca d'Aosta", with which it served in the Italian campaign in Ukraine and Russia. In winter 1942-43 the regiment suffered heavy casualties during the Soviet Little Saturn and Voronezh–Kharkov offensives. For its valor and sacrifice in the Soviet Union the regiment was awarded two Gold Medals of Military Valor. In 1976 the regiment's flag and traditions were assigned to the 6th Bersaglieri Battalion "Palestro", which had become an autonomous unit on 30 October 1975. In 1989 the battalion was reduced to a reserve unit, which was disbanded in 1991. In 1992 the battalion was reformed by renaming the 10th Bersaglieri Battalion "Bezzecca". Afterwards the battalion joined the reformed regiment. In 2005 the 12th Bersaglieri Regiment in Trapani was redesignated as 6th Bersaglieri Regiment. The regiment's anniversary falls, as for all Bersaglieri units, on 18 June 1836, the day the Bersaglieri speciality was founded.

== History ==
On 16 April 1861 the 6th Army Corps Bersaglieri Command was formed in Capua and assigned to the VI Army Corps. The command had purely administrative functions and consisted of the newly formed XXVIII, XXIX, XXX, XXXI, XXXII, and XXXIII battalions, and the VI Bersaglieri Depot Battalion. On 31 December 1861 the command was renamed 6th Bersaglieri Regiment, but continued to exert only administrative functions. On 18 December 1864 the Bersaglieri regiments were reduced from six to five and consequently the 4th Bersaglieri Regiment was disbanded and its XXVI Battalion transferred to the 6th Bersaglieri Regiment. In 1865 the regiment formed the XL Battalion and now consisted of eight battalions. On 30 December of the same year the regiment was renamed 4th Bersaglieri Regiment.

On 1 January 1871 the 6th Bersaglieri Regiment was reformed as an operational regiment in Ancona with the VI Battalion, XIII Battalion, XIX Battalion, and XXI Battalion, which were transferred from the 1st Bersaglieri Regiment. The four battalions were renumbered as I, II, III, and IV battalion upon entering the new regiment. On 16 September 1883 the IV Battalion was transferred to the newly formed 12th Bersaglieri Regiment. On 18 June 1886, all Bersaglieri battalions resumed their original numbering and afterwards the 6th Bersaglieri Regiment consisted of the VI Battalion, XIII Battalion, and XIX Battalion.

The VI Battalion had been formed by the Royal Sardinian Army in 1848 with volunteers from Lombardy under command of Luciano Manara. The battalion fought in the First Italian War of Independence and participated as "volunteer" unit in the defense of Rome during the French siege of the Roman Republic in 1849. In 1859 the VI Battalion fought in the Second Italian War of Independence, during which the battalion distinguished itself in the crossing of the Sesia river and in the battles of Battle of Palestro and at Borgo Vercelli. For its conduct during the war the VI Battalion was awarded a Bronze Medal of Military Valor, which was affixed to the flag of the 6th Bersaglieri Regiment and added to the regiment's coat of arms, when the battalion joined the regiment. The XIII Battalion was formed in 1859 and the XIX Battalion in 1860. In 1862 the VI Battalion participated in the Battle of Aspromonte against Giuseppe Garibaldi's Redshirts, which were marching to occupy Rome. For stopping Garibaldi's volunteers the VI Battalion was awarded a Bronze Medal of Military Valor, which was affixed to the flag of the 6th Bersaglieri Regiment and added to the regiment's coat of arms, when the battalion joined the regiment.

In 1866 the battalions participated in the Third Italian War of Independence, during which the XIII Battalion distinguished itself in the Battle of Custoza and was awarded a Bronze Medal of Military Valor, which was affixed to the flag of the 6th Bersaglieri Regiment and added to the regiment's coat of arms, when the battalion joined the regiment. In September 1870 the VI and XIX battalions participated in the capture of Rome.

In 1895-96 the regiment provided 15 officers and 37 troops to help form the I, III, and IV provisional battalions, which were deployed to Eritrea for the First Italo-Ethiopian War. On 1 October 1910 the regiment's depot in Bologna formed the VI Cyclists Battalion. In 1911, the regiment provided 22 officers and 1,215 troops to augment units fighting in the Italo-Turkish War.

=== World War I ===
At the outbreak of World War I the regiment consisted of the VI, XIII, and XIX battalions and the VI Cyclists Battalion, which operated as an autonomous unit throughout the war. In January 1915 the depot of the 6th Bersaglieri Regiment in Bologna formed the XLIX and L battalions, which initially operated as autonomous units. On 20 May 1915, three days before Italy entered World War I, the regiment formed, together with the 9th Bersaglieri Regiment, 11th Bersaglieri Regiment, and 12th Bersaglieri Regiment the Special Bersaglieri Division, which also included the IV Mountain Artillery Group of the 1st Mountain Artillery Regiment and minor support units. On 11 February 1916 the four regiments were grouped together in two brigades: the I Bersaglieri Brigade consisted of the 6th and 12th Bersaglieri regiments, while the II Bersaglieri Brigade consisted of the 9th and 11th Bersaglieri regiments. After not even a year of existence the division was transformed on 5 March 1916 into a standard infantry division, with the infantry Brigade "Piemonte" and Brigade "Aosta" replacing the Bersaglieri brigades, which afterwards were attached, like other Bersaglieri units, to divisions and army corps as needed.

On 23 May 1915, the day Italy entered the war, the 6th Bersaglieri Regiment crossed the border with Austro-Hungary at Robidišče and advanced towards Kobarid. In September 1915 the regiment fought in the Bovec sector. In 1916 the I Bersaglieri Brigade was deployed on the Karst plateau in the area of Veliki Hribach during the Eighth Battle of the Isonzo and then on the Pečinka during the Ninth Battle of the Isonzo. In 1917 the I Bersaglieri Brigade was deployed on the Monte Vodice during the Tenth Battle of the Isonzo and then moved to the Banjšice plateau for the Eleventh Battle of the Isonzo, during which the brigade distinguished itself on 16-20 August. On 24 October 1917 the Austro-Hungarian Army and Imperial German Army commenced the Battle of Caporetto and the next day the brigade defeated three Austro-Hungarian attacks in the area of Monte Globokak. Afterwards the brigade joined the Italian retreat to the Piave river. After escaping over the Piave river the 6th Bersaglieri Regiment counted nine officers and 1,207 troops as lost, while the 12th Bersaglieri Regiment had lost 49 officers and 1,551 troops. To bring the two regiments back up to strength the 21st Bersaglieri Regiment was disbanded and its personnel assigned to the two regiments. Between 23 November and 5 December 1917 the brigade fought on the Monte Meletta di Gallio during the First Battle of Monte Grappa. Stopping the Austro-Hungarian offensive cost the 6th Bersaglieri Regiment 69 officers and 1,762 troops, while the 12th Bersaglieri Regiment lost 52 officers and 1,670 troops. Afterwards the shattered brigade was sent to Valdagno in the rear to be rebuilt. For its conduct in 1917, especially on Monte Globokak, the 6th Bersaglieri Regiment was awarded a Bronze Medal of Military Valor, which was affixed to the flag of the 6th Bersaglieri Regiment and added to the regiment's coat of arms.

In June 1918 the 6th Bersaglieri Regiment was deployed at Sasso Rosso on Monte Cornone during the Second Battle of the Piave River. During this battle the regiment's VI Cyclists Battalion suffered heavy losses fighting at Losson and then along the lower Sile river. On 24 June 1918 the II, VI, IX, and X Cyclists battalions were disbanded and their remaining personnel merged into a single Cyclists Assault Battalion. In October 1918 the I Bersaglieri Brigade participated in the Battle of Vittorio Veneto.

On 8 June 1915 XLIX and L battalions, which had been formed by the regiment's depot in Bologna, were assigned, together with the LI Battalion, which had been formed by the depot of the 11th Bersaglieri Regiment in Naples, to the 13th Provisional Bersaglieri Regiment. That regiment was already disbanded 17 days later. On 24 September the three battalions were assigned to the 1st bis Bersaglieri Regiment, which was formed as replacement for the 1st Bersaglieri Regiment, which was deployed in Libya. On 5 January 1916 the 1st bis Bersaglieri Regiment was renamed 15th Bersaglieri Regiment. The regiment served on the Italian front. In October 1917 the regiment was deployed in the Carnic Alps and forced to retreat after the disastrous Battle of Caporetto. On 7 November the regiment was surrounded by the advancing Austro-Hungarian troops and forced to surrender after having suffered 2,315 casualties in 11 days of combat.

=== Interwar years ===
After World War I the Royal Italian Army reduced its forces and in 1920 the VI and XIX battalions were reduced to reserve units. On 7 March 1923 the VI Battalion was reformed, and the regiment now consisted of the VI and XIII battalions, and a depot. In July 1924 the regiment became a cyclists unit. On 1 November 1934, the 6th Bersaglieri Regiment, together with the cavalry regiments Regiment "Lancieri di Firenze" and Regiment "Lancieri Vittorio Emanuele II", the 2nd Fast Artillery Regiment, and the II Light Tank Group "San Marco", was assigned to the 2nd Cavalry Division "Emanuele Filiberto Testa di Ferro". In 1936 the regiment lost its role as cyclists unit. On 1 January 1937 the XIX Battalion was reformed as a reserve unit. The same month the regiment formed the 1st Motorcycle Machine Gunners Company, with personnel from the 2nd, 5th, 6th, and 9th Bersaglieri regiments and the 6th Automobilistic Center in Bologna. The company was sent to Spain where it joined the Corpo Truppe Volontarie, which fought on the Nationalist side in the Spanish Civil War. On 7 April 1939 the VI Battalion participated in the Invasion of Albania. On 1 April 1939 the XIX Battalion became an active unit.

=== World War II ===
In the early stages of World War II the regiment was assigned to the 2nd Cavalry Division "Emanuele Filiberto Testa di Ferro", with which it participated in June 1940 in the Invasion of France and in April 1941 in the Invasion of Yugoslavia. At the time the regiment consisted of the following units:

- 6th Bersaglieri Regiment
  - Command Company
  - VI Battalion
  - XIII Battalion
  - XIX Battalion
  - 17th Motorcyclists Company (transferred to the 8th Bersaglieri Regiment for the Western Desert Campaign)
  - 72nd Cannons Company, with 47/32 mod. 35 anti-tank guns (transferred to the 8th Bersaglieri Regiment for the Western Desert Campaign)

On 20 January 1942 the 6th Bersaglieri Regiment was transferred to the 3rd Cavalry Division "Principe Amedeo Duca d'Aosta", which had been deployed to the Eastern front in August 1941 and been fighting in Ukraine since then. On 15 March 1942 the regiment reached the front and entered the front next to the 3rd Bersaglieri Regiment. In summer 1942 the regiment participated in the German summer offensive in southern Russia. From 30 July to 9 August the two Bersaglieri regiments eliminated a Soviet bridgehead at Serafimovich. Later in the same month, and with the support of German tanks, the Bersaglieri repelled a Soviet attack during the first defensive battle of the Don.

By late autumn 1942, the Italian 8th Army was covering, together Hungarian and Romanian forces, the left flank of the German 6th Army, which was attacking Stalingrad. The Italian held front line stretched along the Don river for more than 250 kilometres (160 mi) between the positions of the Hungarian 2nd Army in Kalmiskowa and the positions of the Romanian 3rd Army in Veshenskaya. On 17 December Soviets forces commenced Operation Little Saturn and under immense pressure of superior Soviet armored forces the Italian divisions had to retreat from the Don the next day. After a short respite the Soviets commenced the Voronezh–Kharkov offensive on 13 January 1943 and the Axis forces had to fall back further, with the 3rd Cavalry Division "Principe Amedeo Duca d'Aosta" falling back towards Pavlohrad in Ukraine, where between 4 and 19 February 1943 the 6th Bersaglieri Regiment held its positions against repeated Soviet attacks. On 19 February the remnants of the regiment retreated towards Dnipro, where the survivors arrived two days later.

For the valor shown in the operations of summer 1942 and for its sacrifice during the retreat between 17 December 1942 and 20 February 1943 the 6th Bersaglieri Regiment was awarded two Gold Medals of Military Valor, which were affixed to the regiment's flag and added to the regiment's coat of arms.

On 18 April 1943 the survivors of the regiment returned to Bologna and on 1 July the regiment was reorganized as 6th Motorized Bersaglieri Regiment, with the personnel of the 30th Marching Regiment of the 8th Marching Division. The 8th Marching Division was a temporary unit, which managed replacements for the operational units of the Italian 8th Army, with the 30th Marching Regiment responsible for the replacements of the 3rd Cavalry Division "Principe Amedeo Duca d'Aosta".

- 6th Motorized Bersaglieri Regiment
  - Command Company
  - VI Auto-transported Battalion
  - XIII Auto-transported Battalion
  - XIX Auto-transported Battalion
  - Anti-tank Company, with 75/18 self-propelled guns
  - Motorcyclists Company
  - Auto Unit

After the announcement of the Armistice of Cassibile on 8 September 1943 the regiment was disbanded by invading German forces.

=== Cold War ===
On 1 October 1969 the VI Bersaglieri Battalion was reformed as a mechanized unit of the 22nd Armored Infantry Regiment "Cremona". During the 1975 army reform the army disbanded the regimental level and newly independent battalions were granted for the first time their own flags. On 29 October 1975 the 22nd Armored Infantry Regiment "Cremona" was disbanded and the next day the regiment's VI Bersaglieri Battalion in Turin became an autonomous unit and was renamed 6th Bersaglieri Battalion "Palestro". The battalion was named for the Battle of Palestro, where the VI Battalion had distinguished itself during the Second Italian War of Independence. The battalion was assigned to the 3rd Mechanized Brigade "Goito" and consisted of a command, a command and services company, three mechanized companies with M113 armored personnel carriers, and a heavy mortar company with M106 mortar carriers with 120mm Mod. 63 mortars. The battalion fielded now 896 men (45 officers, 100 non-commissioned officers, and 751 soldiers).

On 12 November 1976 the President of the Italian Republic Giovanni Leone assigned with decree 846 the flag and traditions of the 6th Bersaglieri Regiment to the battalion. On 5 December 1989 the 6th Bersaglieri Battalion "Palestro" was reduced to a reserve unit and on 15 December the flag of the 6th Bersaglieri Regiment was transferred to the Shrine of the Flags in the Vittoriano in Rome. The battalion continued to be listed on the reserve rolls until 31 May 1991, when it was officially disbanded.

=== Recent times ===
On 15 September 1992 the 10th Bersaglieri Battalion "Bezzecca" in Bologna transferred its flag to the Shrine of the Flags in the Vittoriano in Rome. The next day, on 16 September 1992, the troops and equipment of the 10th Bersaglieri Battalion "Bezzecca" were used to reform the 6th Bersaglieri Battalion "Palestro", which on the same day entered the reformed 6th Bersaglieri Regiment. The regiment was assigned to the Mechanized Brigade "Friuli". Between 27 November 1993 and 24 February 1994 the regiment served with the United Nations Operation in Somalia II, for which it was awarded a Silver Medal of Army Valor, which was affixed to the flag of the 6th Bersaglieri Regiment and added to the regiment's coat of arms.

In early 2005 the regiment's companies in Bologna were disbanded and on 14 April 2005 the regiment's flag left Bologna and was transferred to Trapani, where the next day, on 15 April 2005, it replaced the flag of the 12th Bersaglieri Regiment of the Mechanized Brigade "Aosta". Subsequently the flag of the 12th Bersaglieri Regiment was transferred to the Shrine of the Flags in the Vittoriano in Rome. In the following years the regiment deployed to Iraq as part of the Multi-National Force – Iraq, to Afghanistan as part of NATO's International Security Assistance Force, to Lebanon as part of the UN's United Nations Interim Force in Lebanon, and to Kosovo as part of NATO's KFOR. For its many deployments the regiment was awarded a Military Order of Italy, which was affixed to the regiment's flag.

== Organization ==
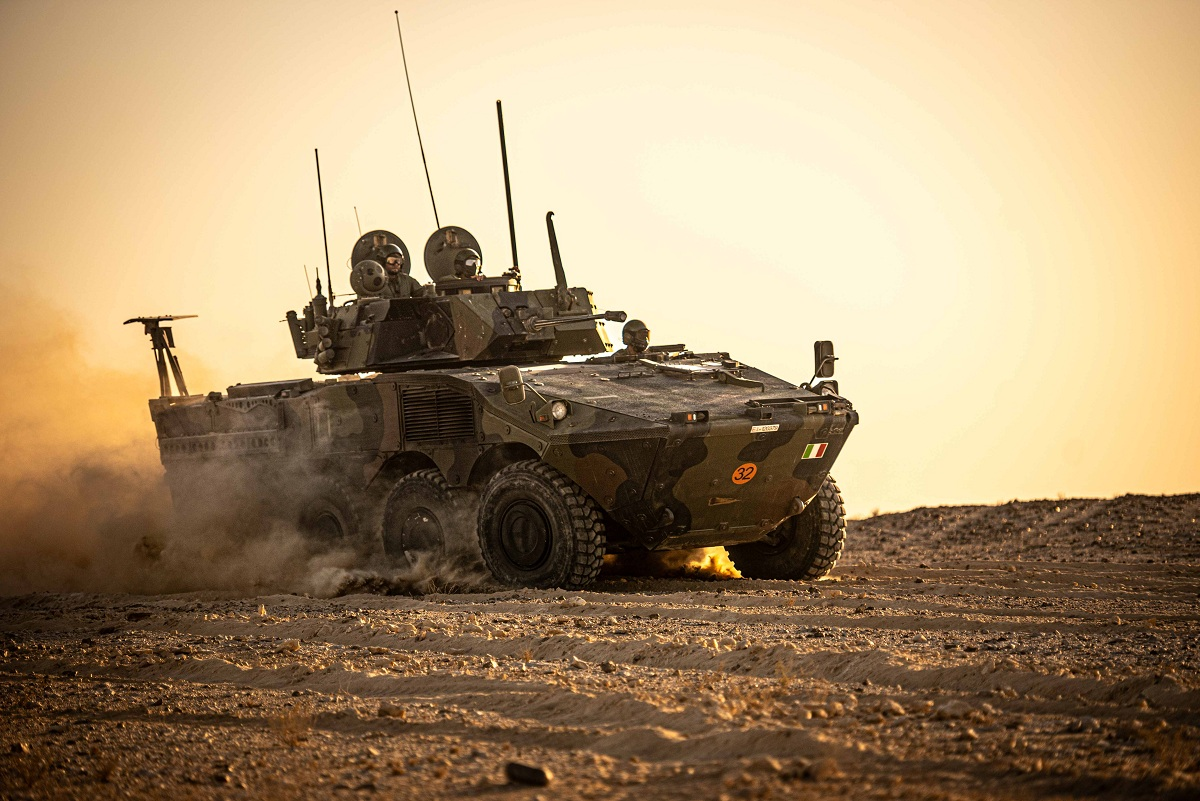
6th Bersaglieri Regiment Freccia IFV during the Nasr 2025 exercise in Qatar

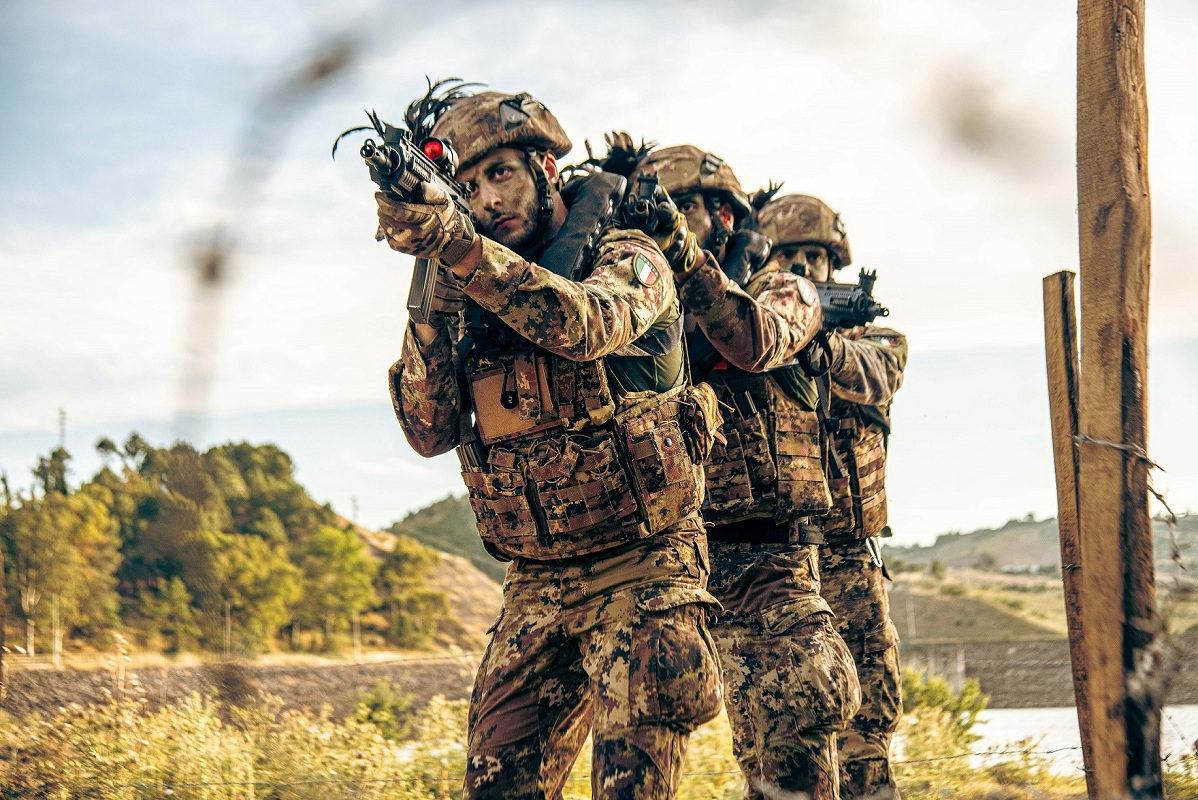
6th Bersaglieri Regiment squad on the move during exercise Salamandra 2025

As of 2025 the 6th Bersaglieri Regiment is organized as follows:

- 6th Bersaglieri Regiment, in Trapani
  - Command and Logistic Support Company
  - 6th Bersaglieri Battalion "Palestro"
    - 1st Bersaglieri Company
    - 2nd Bersaglieri Company
    - 3rd Bersaglieri Company
    - Maneuver Support Company

The regiment is equipped with Freccia wheeled infantry fighting vehicles. The Maneuver Support Company is equipped with Freccia mortar carries with 120mm mortars and Freccia IFVs with Spike LR anti-tank guided missiles.

== See also ==
- Bersaglieri
