= Revolt of Genoa =

1849 insurgency, part of Unification of Italy

The revolt of Genoa took place between Thursday 5 April and Wednesday 11 April 1849. Genoa was then part of the Kingdom of Sardinia, but had only become so comparatively recently, after the final defeat of Napoleon Bonaparte in 1815. The uprising broke out after King Vittorio Emanuele II had signed an armistice with the Austrian general Joseph Radetzky on 25 March to end the First Italian War of Independence.

The Genoese, reluctant subjects of the Kingdom of Sardinia, restored autonomous government in the ancient capital of the Republic of Genoa and more recently of the Napoleonic Ligurian Republic. The king sent General Alfonso La Marmora to quell the revolt. After several days of violent clashes, starting on 5 April the city was bombarded without warning for thirty-six hours in clear violation of contemporary customs of war. During the heavy bombardment, the government troops began to attack civilian homes. Genoa resisted effectively until 11 April, when the city was occupied by an army of 25–30,000 Bersaglieri.

After the city was effectively occupied, Vittorio Emanuele II thanked General La Marmora in a letter.
