= Solbiate Olona =

- Comune
- Comune di Solbiate Olona
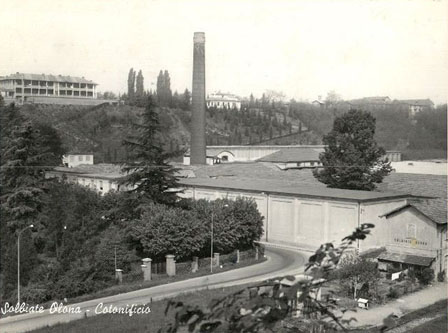

- Location within Italy Location within Lombardy
- Coordinates: 45°39′N 8°53′E
- Country: Italy
- Region: Lombardy
- Province: Province of Varese (VA)

Area
  - Total: 4.9 km^{2} (1.9 sq mi)
- Elevation: 247 m (810 ft)

Population (2011)
  - Total: 5,414
  - Density: 1,100/km^{2} (2,900/sq mi)
- Demonym: Solbiatesi
- Time zone: UTC+1 (CET)
  - Summer (DST): UTC+2 (CEST)
- Postal code: 21058
- Dialing code: 0331
- Website: Official website

Solbiate Olona is a comune (municipality) in the Province of Varese in the Italian region Lombardy, located about 30 km (19 mi) northwest of Milan and about 20 km (12 mi) south of Varese. As of 31 December 2020, it had a population of 5,414 and an area of 4.9 km^{2} (1.9 sq mi).

Solbiate Olona borders the following municipalities: Fagnano Olona, Gorla Maggiore, Gorla Minore, Olgiate Olona.

== Demographic evolution ==
Historical population

Year	Pop.	±%
1861	1,098	—
1871	1,181	+7.6%
1881	1,324	+12.1%
1901	1,744	+31.7%
1911	2,119	+21.5%

Year	Pop.	±%
1921	2,182	+3.0%
1931	2,289	+4.9%
1936	2,291	+0.1%
1951	2,770	+20.9%
1961	3,249	+17.3%

Year	Pop.	±%
1971	3,929	+20.9%
1981	4,205	+7.0%
1991	4,792	+14.0%
2001	5,594	+16.7%

Source: Data from ISTAT
