= Mechanized Brigade "Goito" =

Former Italian military unit

Brigata Meccanizzata "Goito"
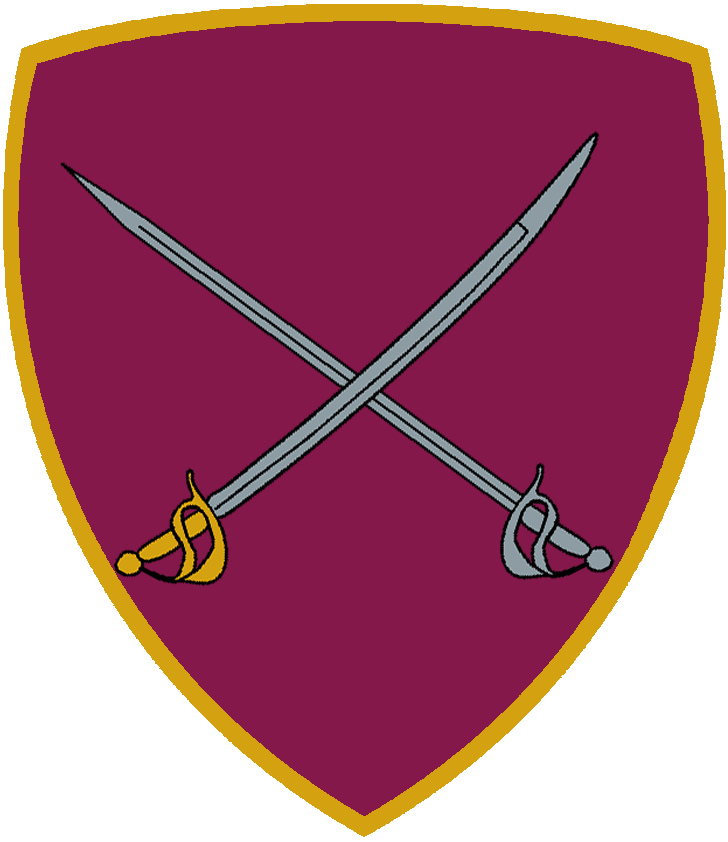
- Coat of Arms of the Mechanized Brigade "Goito" after 1986
- Active: 21 October 1975 – 1 June 1991
- Country: Italy
- Allegiance: Italian Army
- Branch: Infantry
- Role: Armored warfare
- Size: Brigade
- Part of: 1975–1986 Armored Division "Centauro"; 1986–1991 3rd Army Corps
- Garrison/HQ: Milan

The Mechanized Brigade "Goito" was a mechanized brigade of the Italian Army. Its core units were mechanized Bersaglieri battalions. The brigade's headquarters was in the city of Milan. The brigade's name was chosen in memory of the First Italian War of Independence Battle of Goito, where the Bersaglieri corps had its baptism of fire.

== History ==
The brigade was activated during the 1975 reform of the Italian Army when the regimental level was abolished and battalions came under the direct command of newly formed multi-arms brigades. On 21 October 1975 the 3rd Mechanized Brigade "Goito" was activated by renaming and reorganizing the command of the 3rd Bersaglieri Regiment of the Armored Division "Centauro". The Goito took command of the units of the disbanded 3rd Bersaglieri Regiment. To bring the new brigade to full strength it received the 6th Bersaglieri Battalion "Palestro" from the 22nd Armored Infantry Regiment "Cremona" of the Infantry Division "Cremona", the 3rd Field Artillery Group "Pastrengo" from the 11th Field Artillery Regiment of the Infantry Division "Legnano", and the I Services Battalion "Centauro" from the "Centauro" Division's Services Grouping "Centauro". Additionally, an anti-tank company and an engineer company were raised for the Goito.

The Armored Division "Centauro" was part of the 3rd Army Corps based in North-Western Italy. The 3rd Army Corps was tasked with defending Lombardy and Piedmont in case the 4th Alpine Army Corps and 5th Army Corps would have failed to stop an invasion by Warsaw Pact forces east of the Adige river. The brigade's authorized strength was 4,733 men (272 Officers, 637 non-commissioned officers and 3,824 soldiers) and it was initially composed by the following units:

- 3rd Mechanized Brigade "Goito", in Milan
  - Command and Signal Unit "Goito", in Milan
  - 4th Tank Battalion "M.O. Passalacqua", in Solbiate Olona (Leopard 1A2 main battle tanks)
  - 6th Bersaglieri Battalion "Palestro", in Turin (VCC-2 armoured personnel carriers)
  - 10th Bersaglieri Battalion "Bezzecca", in Solbiate Olona (VCC-2 armoured personnel carriers)
  - 18th Bersaglieri Battalion "Poggio Scanno", in Milan (VCC-2 armoured personnel carriers)
  - 3rd Field Artillery Group "Pastrengo", in Vercelli (M101 105 mm towed howitzers, replaced with M109 155 mm self-propelled howitzers in the early 1980s)
  - Logistic Battalion "Goito", in Monza
  - Anti-tank Company "Goito", in Turin
  - Engineer Company "Goito", in Novara

On 1 November 1986, the Italian Army abolished the divisional level and the brigades, which until then had been under one of the Army's four divisions, came forthwith under the direct command of the Army's 3rd or 5th Army Corps. The "Goito" along with the "Centauro" and "Legnano" brigades came under the 3rd Army Corps. On the occasion, the brigades dropped the numbers from their names and received a new coat of arms.

After the end of the Cold War, the Italian Army began to draw down its forces. The first unit to be disbanded was the 6th Bersaglieri Battalion, whose battle flag was returned to the Vittoriano in Rome on 5 December 1989. The Goito itself was disbanded on 1 June 1991 along with most of its subordinate units. The remaining units were distributed among other brigades: the 4th Tank Battalion and 18th Bersaglieri Battalion joined the Mechanized Brigade "Legnano", while the 10th Bersaglieri Battalion had already moved to Bologna and joined the Mechanized Brigade "Trieste" on 1 March 1991.
