= Mantova (disambiguation) =

Mantova is the Italian name of the city called Mantua in English.

Mantova may also refer to:

- Province of Mantua (Provincia di Mantova), Italy
- Duchy of Mantua (Ducato di Mantova), a duchy subject to the Holy Roman Empire; annexed to the Cisalpine Republic c. 1797
- Mantua railway station (Stazione di Mantova)
- Mantova F.C., the football club based in Mantua/Mantova
- 104th Motorised Division Mantova, an Italian Army unit in World War II
- Mantova Mechanized Brigade, various Italian Army units, the last of which was disbanded in 1997
- Mantova Division, an Italian Army unit to be formed in 2014
