= 114th Infantry Regiment "Mantova" =

Inactive Italian Army infantry unit

- 114° Reggimento Fanteria "Mantova"
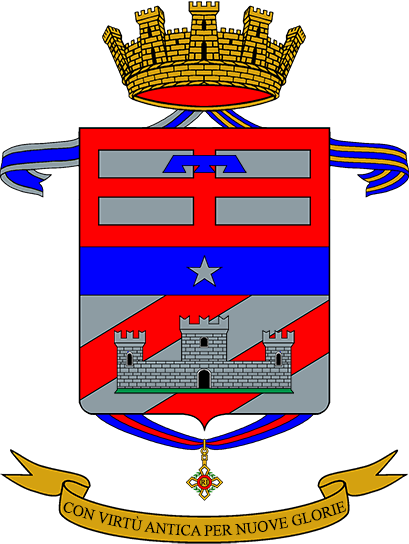
- Regimental coat of arms
- Active: 1 March 1915 – Nov. 1919; 15 Oct. 1941 – 31 Oct. 1995
- Country: Italy
- Branch: Italian Army
- Garrison/HQ: Tricesimo
- Motto: "Con virtù antica per nuove glorie"
- Anniversaries: 27 October 1918 – Battle of Moriago
- Decorations: 1× Military Order of Italy; 1× Silver Medal of Military Valor; 1× Silver Medal of Army Valor

Insignia
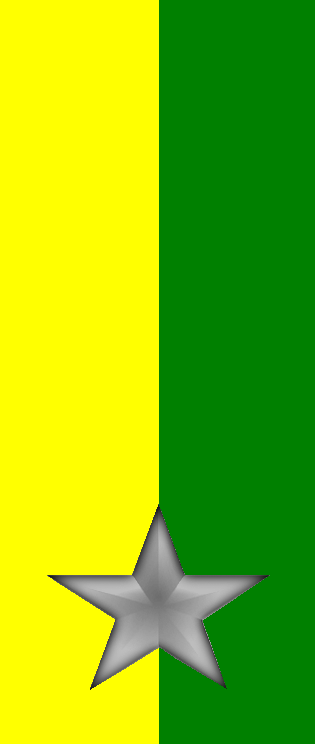
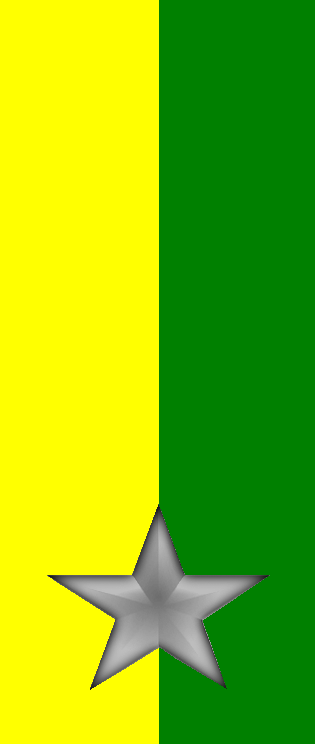
- Regimental gorget patches

The 114th Infantry Regiment "Mantova" (Italian: 114° Reggimento Fanteria "Mantova") is an inactive unit of the Italian Army last based in Tricesimo. The regiment is named for the city of Mantua (Mantova in Italian) and part of the Italian Army's infantry arm.

The regiment was formed in preparation for Italy's entry into World War I. During the war the regiment fought on the Italian front and was disbanded once the war concluded. The regiment was reformed during World War II and assigned to the 104th Infantry Division "Mantova". The division was in Calabria when the Armistice of Cassibile was announced on 8 September 1943 and joined the Italian Co-belligerent Army. In October 1944 the division was reorganized as Combat Group "Mantova", which in spring 1945 joined the British Eighth Army for the Italian campaign. After the war the regiment was based in the Friuli region. In 1975 the regiment was reduced to a battalion sized mechanized unit. In 1993 the regiment was reformed and but due to the drawdown of forces after the end of the Cold War the regiment was disbanded in 1995.

== History ==
=== Formation ===
On 1 March 1915 the command of the Brigade "Mantova" and the 114th Infantry Regiment (Brigade "Mantova") were formed in Mantua by the regimental depot of the 72nd Infantry Regiment (Brigade "Puglie"). On the same day and the 113th Infantry Regiment (Brigade "Mantova") was formed in Verona by the regimental depot of the 79th Infantry Regiment (Brigade "Roma"). Both regiments consisted of three battalions, which each fielded four fusilier companies and one machine gun section.

=== World War I ===
During World War I the Brigade "Mantova" fought on the Italian front: in 1915 the brigade operated in the Val Lagarina valley. In 1916 it was transferred to the Isonzo front and operated on the Karst plateau and in November of the same year the brigade fought in the Ninth Battle of the Isonzo on the slopes of Nad Bregom. In 1917 the brigade fought in May in the Tenth Battle of the Isonzo at Sela na Krasu and in August in the Eleventh Battle of the Isonzo on Monte Ermada. In June 1918 the brigade withstood ferocious Austro-Hungarian attacks on the Montello during the Second Battle of the Piave River. In October of the same year the brigade fought in the decisive Battle of Vittorio Veneto, during which the XXIII Army Corps managed to cross the Piave river at Moriago and break through the Austro-Hungarian lines with the 114th Infantry Regiment in the lead. From Moriago the regiment advanced over the San Boldo Pass to Trichiana, where it was reached by the news of the Armistice of Villa Giusti. For its conduct at Moriago the 114th Infantry Regiment was awarded a Silver Medal of Military Valor. After the war the brigade and its two regiments were disbanded in November 1919.

=== World War II ===
After Italy's entry into World War II the two regiments of the Brigade "Mantova" were reformed by the regimental depots of the 9th Infantry Division "Pasubio": the 113th Infantry Regiment "Mantova" was reformed on 1 January 1942 in Verona by the depot of 79th Infantry Regiment "Pasubio", while the 114th Infantry Regiment "Mantova" had already been reformed on 10 December 1941 in Mantua by the depot of the 80th Infantry Regiment "Pasubio". On 15 March 1942 the two regiments were assigned to the 104th Infantry Division "Mantova", which also included the newly formed 121st Motorized Artillery Regiment, which had been formed by the 21st Artillery Regiment "Trieste" in Piacenza. The two infantry regiments consisted of a command, a command company, three fusilier battalions, a cannons company equipped with 47/32 anti-tank guns, and a mortar company equipped with 81mm Mod. 35 mortars.

The division remained in Piedmont until January 1943, when it was transferred to Nicastro in Calabria. After allied forces had landed on the Italian peninsula and the Armistice of Cassibile had been announced on 8 September 1943 the division remained loyal to King Victor Emmanuel III. The division joined the Italian Co-belligerent Army and on 16 October 1943 transferred its 113th Infantry Regiment "Mantova" to the US Fifth Army to guard American installations in Italy. On 30 October 1943 the division received the 76th Infantry Regiment "Napoli" as replacement for the 113th. On 1 October 1944 the division was renamed Combat Group "Mantova" and its units, the 76th and 114th infantry regiments and the 155th Artillery Regiment "Emilia", were equipped with British materiel. In spring 1945 the combat group joined the British Eighth Army for the Italian campaign, but soon afterwards the German forces in Italy surrendered.

=== Cold War ===
On 15 October 1945 the Combat Group "Mantova" was renamed Infantry Division "Mantova". Initially the division was based in Liguria, but when the Treaty of Paris between Italy and the Allied Powers came into effect on 15 September 1947 the division moved to the Friuli region to take possession of the territories returned to Italy. On 16 September 1947 the 114th Infantry Regiment "Mantova" became the first Italian unit to return to the city of Gorizia. At the time the regiment consisted of a command, a command company, three fusilier battalions, a mortar company equipped with 81mm Mod. 35 mortars, and an anti-tank cannons company equipped with QF 6-pounder anti-tank guns.

In 1965 the regiment moved from Gorizia to Tricesimo. At the time the regiment consisted of a command, a command company, three infantry battalions, a mechanized Battalion, and an anti-tank company.

During the 1975 army reform the army disbanded the regimental level and newly independent battalions were granted for the first time their own flags. On 31 October 1975 the 114th Infantry Regiment "Mantova" was disbanded and the next day the regiment's II Battalion in Tarcento was renamed 114th Mechanized Infantry Battalion "Moriago" and assigned the flag and traditions of the 114th Infantry Regiment "Mantova". To avoid confusion with the Mechanized Division "Mantova" the battalion's name was changed from "Mantova" to "Moriago" to commemorate the battle the 114th Infantry Regiment had fought there on 27 October 1918.

The battalion was assigned to the Mechanized Brigade "Isonzo" and consisted of a command, a command and services company, three mechanized companies with M113 armored personnel carriers, and a heavy mortar company with M106 mortar carriers with 120mm Mod. 63 mortars. At the time the battalion fielded 896 men (45 officers, 100 non-commissioned officers, and 751 soldiers).

For its conduct and work after the 1976 Friuli earthquake the battalion was awarded a Silver Medal of Army Valor, which was affixed to the battalion's flag and added to the battalion's coat of arms. Due to the damage caused by the earthquake to the battalion's barracks in Tarcento the battalion moved in 1976 from Tarcento to Tricesimo.

In 1986 the Italian Army abolished the divisional level and brigades, which until then had been under one of the Army's four divisions, came under direct command of the Army's 3rd Army Corps or 5th Army Corps. As the Mechanized Division "Mantova" carried the traditions of the 104th Infantry Division "Mantova" and Combat Group "Mantova", which had both fought against the Germans during the Italian campaign of World War II the army decided to retain the name of the division. On 30 September 1986 the Mantova's division command in Udine was disbanded and the next day the command of the Mechanized Brigade "Isonzo" moved from Cividale del Friuli to Udine, where the command was renamed Mechanized Brigade "Mantova". The brigade retained the Isonzo's units, including the 114th Mechanized Infantry Battalion "Moriago".

=== Recent times ===
On 21 October 1993 the 114th Mechanized Infantry Battalion "Moriago" lost its autonomy and the next day the battalion entered the reformed 114th Infantry Regiment "Mantova" as I Mechanized Battalion.

On 31 October 1995 the 114th Infantry Regiment "Mantova" was disbanded after it had transferred its flag to the Shrine of the Flags in the Vittoriano in Rome on 26 October.
