= Logistic Battalion "Mantova" =

Inactive Italian Army brigade logistics unit

- Battaglione Logistico "Mantova"
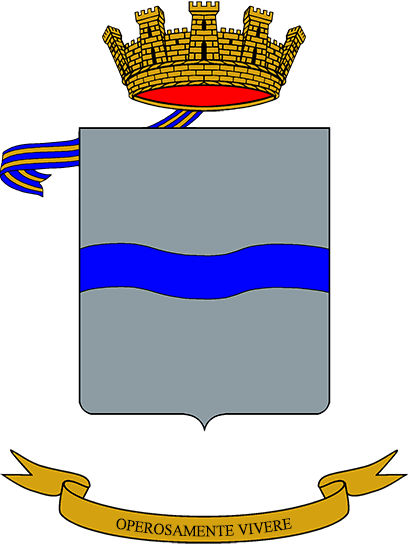
- Battalion coat of arms
- Active: 1 Nov. 1975 — 30 June 1996
- Country: Italy
- Branch: Italian Army
- Type: Military logistics
- Part of: Mechanized Brigade "Isonzo"; Mechanized Brigade "Mantova"
- Garrison/HQ: Tricesimo
- Motto(s): "Operosamente vivere"
- Anniversaries: 22 May 1916 - Battle of Asiago
- Decorations: 1× Bronze Medal of Army Valor

Insignia
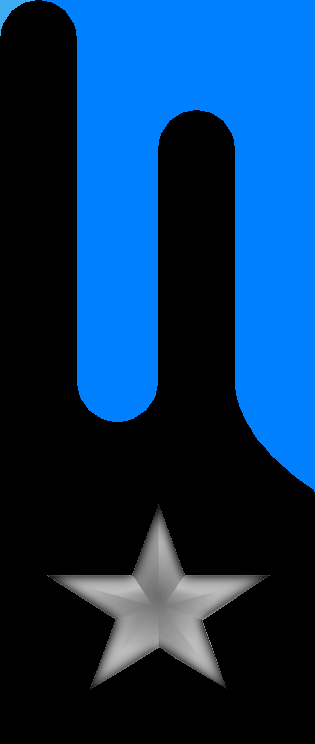
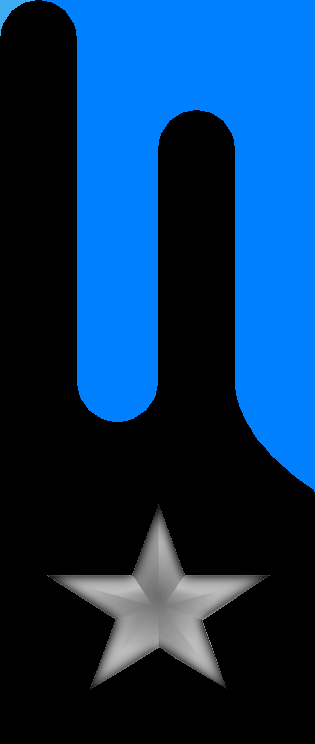
- Unit gorget patches

The Logistic Battalion "Mantova" (Italian: Battaglione Logistico "Mantova") is an inactive military logistics battalion of the Italian Army, which was assigned to the Mechanized Brigade "Mantova". The battalion's anniversary falls, as for all units of the Italian Army's Transport and Materiel Corps, on 22 May, the anniversary of the Royal Italian Army's first major use of automobiles to transport reinforcements to the Asiago plateau to counter the Austro-Hungarian Asiago Offensive in May 1916.

== History ==
The battalion is the spiritual successor of the logistic units of the Royal Italian Army's 14th Infantry Division "Isonzo", which was active during World War II.

=== Cold War ===
As part of the 1975 army reform the units of the Infantry Division "Mantova" were reorganized: on 21 October 1975, the Mechanized Brigade "Isonzo" was formed in the city of Cividale del Friuli and assigned to the Mechanized Division "Mantova". On 1 November of the same year, the Logistic Battalion "Isonzo" was formed in Tricesimo and assigned to the brigade. Initially the battalion consisted of a command, a command platoon, a supply and transport company, a medium workshop, and a vehicle park. At the time the battalion fielded 692 men (38 officers, 85 non-commissioned officers, and 569 soldiers).

On 12 November 1976, the President of the Italian Republic Giovanni Leone granted with decree 846 the battalion a flag.

For its conduct and work after the 1976 Friuli earthquake the battalion was awarded a Bronze Medal of Army Valor, which was affixed to the battalion's flag and added to the battalion's coat of arms.

On 1 December 1981, the battalion was reorganized and consisted afterwards of the following units:

- Logistic Battalion "Isonzo", in Tricesimo
  - Command and Services Company
  - Supply Company
  - Maintenance Company
  - Medium Transport Company
  - Medical Unit (Reserve)

In 1986, the Italian Army abolished the divisional level and brigades, which until then had been under one of the Army's four divisions, came under direct command of the Army's 3rd Army Corps or 5th Army Corps. As the Mechanized Division "Mantova" carried the traditions of the 104th Infantry Division "Mantova" and Combat Group "Mantova", which had both fought against the Germans during the Italian campaign of World War II the army decided to retain the name of the division. On 30 September 1986, the command of the Mechanized Division "Mantova" in Udine was disbanded and the next day the command of the Mechanized Brigade "Isonzo" moved from Cividale del Friuli to Udine, where the command was renamed Mechanized Brigade "Mantova". The "Mantova" brigade retained the Isonzo's units, which, including the Logistic Battalion "Isonzo", changed their names from "Isonzo" to "Mantova".

=== Recent times ===
On 1 April 1996, Logistic Battalion "Gorizia" joined the Mechanized Brigade "Mantova" and consequently, on 30 June 1996, the Logistic Battalion "Mantova" was disbanded. On 3 July of the same year, the disbanded battalion's flag was transferred to the Shrine of the Flags in the Vittoriano in Rome for safekeeping.

== See also ==
- Military logistics
