= 59th Infantry Regiment "Calabria" =

Inactive Italian Army infantry unit

- 59° Reggimento Fanteria "Calabria"
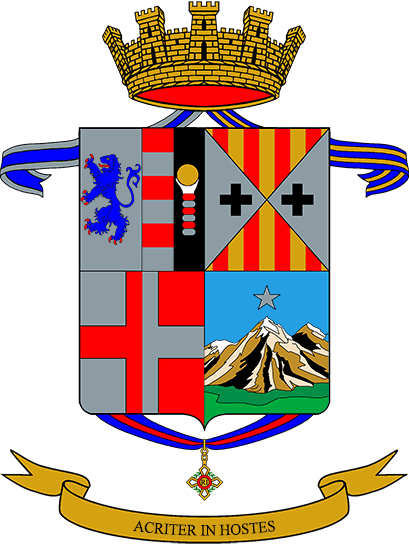
- Regimental coat of arms
- Active: 16 April 1861 – 30 June 1991
- Country: Italy
- Branch: Italian Army
- Part of: Mechanized Brigade "Mantova"
- Garrison/HQ: Cividale
- Motto: "Acriter in hostes"
- Anniversaries: 18 April 1916 – Conquest of Col di Lana
- Decorations: 1× Military Order of Italy; 1× Silver Medal of Military Valor; 1× Silver Medal of Army Valor

Insignia
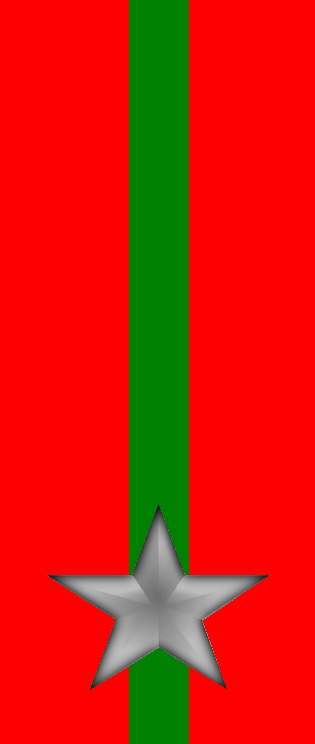
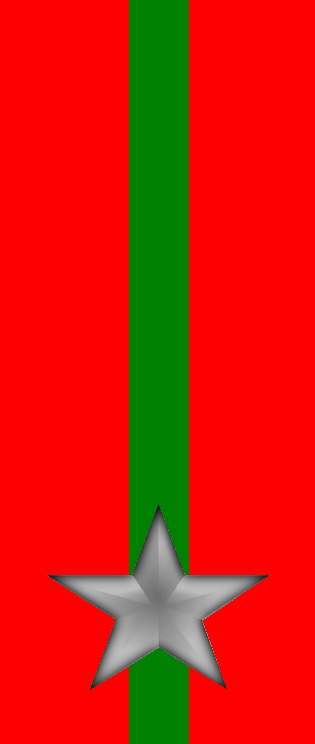
- Regimental gorget patches

The 59th Infantry Regiment "Calabria" (Italian: 59° Reggimento Fanteria "Calabria") is an inactive unit of the Italian Army last based in Cividale. The regiment is named for the region of Calabria and part of the Italian Army's infantry arm. The regiment was one of ten infantry regiments formed by the Royal Italian Army on 16 April 1861. In 1866, the regiment participated in the Third Italian War of Independence. During World War I, the regiment fought on the Italian front. During World War II, the regiment was assigned to the 31st Infantry Division "Calabria", which remained on the island of Sardinia throughout the war.

In 1947 the regiment moved from Cagliari in Sardinia to Palmanova in Friuli-Venezia Giulia, where the regiment joined the Infantry Division "Mantova". In 1975 the regiment was disbanded and its flag and traditions assigned to the 59th Mechanized Infantry Battalion "Calabria". The battalion was assigned to the Mechanized Brigade "Isonzo", which in 1986 was renamed Mechanized Brigade "Mantova". In 1989 the battalion was reduced to a reserve unit, which was disbanded on 30 June 1991. The regiment's anniversary falls on 18 April 1916, the day the regiment conquered the summit of Col di Lana, for which the regiment was awarded a Silver Medal of Military Valor.

== History ==
=== Formation ===
On 16 April 1861, the Royal Italian Army formed the Brigade "Calabria" in Modena. The brigade consisted of the 59th Infantry Regiment and 60th Infantry Regiment, which were formed on the same day and based in Brescia, respectively in Modena. The 59th Infantry Regiment received three battalions ceded by the 20th Infantry Regiment of the Brigade "Brescia", and by the 21st Infantry Regiment and 22nd Infantry Regiment of the Brigade "Cremona", while the 60th Infantry Regiment received three battalions ceded by the 11th Infantry Regiment and 12th Infantry Regiment of the Brigade "Casale", and by the 17th Infantry Regiment of the Brigade "Acqui".

On 1 August 1862, both regiments of the Brigade "Calabria" ceded one of their depot companies to help form the 67th Infantry Regiment (Brigade "Palermo"), and their 17th Company and 18th Company to help form the 68th Infantry Regiment (Brigade "Palermo"). In 1862–66 the 59th Infantry Regiment operated in Southern Italy and then Sicily to suppress the anti-Sardinian revolt, which had erupted after the Kingdom of Sardinia had annexed the Kingdom of Two Sicilies. In 1866, the Brigade "Calabria" participated in the Third Italian War of Independence.

On 25 October 1871, the brigade level was abolished, and the two regiments of the Brigade "Calabria" were renamed 59th Infantry Regiment "Calabria", respectively 60th Infantry Regiment "Calabria". On 2 January 1881, the brigade level was reintroduced, and the two regiments were renamed again as 59th Infantry Regiment (Brigade "Calabria") and 60th Infantry Regiment (Brigade "Calabria"). On 1 November 1884, the 59th Infantry Regiment ceded some of its companies to help form the 81st Infantry Regiment (Brigade "Torino") in Turin. In 1895–96, the regiment provided 13 officers and 233 enlisted for units deployed to Italian Eritrea for the First Italo-Ethiopian War. In 1911, the regiment provided 16 officers and 1,007 enlisted for units deployed to Libya for the Italo-Turkish War.

=== World War I ===
At the outbreak of World War I, the Brigade "Calabria" formed, together with the Brigade "Alpi" and the 33rd Field Artillery Regiment, the 18th Division. At the time the 59th Infantry Regiment consisted of three battalions, each of which fielded four fusilier companies and one machine gun section. On 1 March 1915, the 59th Infantry Regiment's depot in Civitavecchia formed the command of the Brigade "Lazio" and the 131st Infantry Regiment for the new brigade. After Italy's entry into the war on 23 May 1915, the Brigade "Calabria" was deployed on the Italian front: on 5 July 1915, the brigade began operations to clear Austro-Hungarian Army position in the upper Cordevole Valley. On 8 July 1915, the 59th Infantry Regiment began operations to take the summit of Col di Lana. On 28 July 1915, both regiments resumed the attack to take the summit of the Col di Lana. For the rest of the year the two regiments continued the attacks against the Austro-Hungarian positions on Col di Lana. On 7 November 1915, the 60th Infantry Regiment's III Battalion finally reached the Col di Lana summit, but an Austro-Hungarian counterattack the following night drove the Italians back. On 20 November, two companies of the 52nd Infantry Regiment (Brigade "Alpi") and two companies of the 59th Infantry Regiment tried again to conquer the summit, but failed due to the adverse weather conditions. In 1915, the Brigade "Calabria" suffered 3,092 casualties on the Col di Lana.

During the night of 18 April 1916, the Italians detonated five tonnes of blasting gelatin in a mine driven under the summit of Col di Lana. The explosion destroyed the Austro-Hungarian summit position and the 59th Infantry Regiment's I Battalion stormed the summit, while the III Battalion attacked the ridge between the summits of Col di Lana and Monte Sief. On 20–21 April the 60th Infantry Regiment continued the attack over the summit ridge towards Monte Sief. After a pause, the 59th Infantry Regiment's III Battalion attempted again to storm the summit of Monte Sief on 26 May 1916. On 18 July 1916, the Brigade "Calabria" was transferred to the Travignolo Valley.

The brigade was now tasked with taking the summits of Cima Stradon and Piccolo Colbricon. On 20 July 1916, the brigade began its attack and on 26 July the brigade broke into the Austro-Hungarian defenses on Cima Stradon, but was forced to retreat due to an Austro-Hungarian counterattack. The brigade resumed the attack on 4 August, and then after a pause renewed the attack again on 23, 24, and 25 August. On the latter date, the 59th Infantry Regiment's 6th Company managed to break into the Austro-Hungarian trenches on the Piccolo Colbricon, but was again forced to retreat after the enemy counterattacked. By now the brigade had suffered 2,842 casualties and further attacks were called off.

In January 1917, the 59th Infantry Regiment's depot in Civitavecchia formed the command of the Brigade "Pesaro" and the 239th Infantry Regiment for the new brigade, while the 60th Infantry Regiment's depot in Viterbo formed the 240th Infantry Regiment for the new brigade. On 22 May and on 1 August 1917, the brigade defeated Austro-Hungarian attempts to dislodge the brigade from its positions on the ridges and slopes on Cima Stradon and Piccolo Colbricon. These defensive battles cost the brigades a further 1,648 casualties.

After the disastrous Battle of Caporetto the brigade retreated to the new frontline along the Piave river. On 18 November 1917, the Brigade "Calabria" entered the frontline on the Monte Grappa massif, where the brigade fought in the First Battle of Monte Grappa on Monte Tomba and the neighboring Monfenera. On 22 November 1917, the Austro-Hungarian forces drove the Brigade "Calabria" off the summit of Monte Tomba, but the brigade counterattacked five times and retook the summit. On the same day the 59th Infantry Regiment's II Battalion and III Battalion defeated a series of enemy attacks on Monfenera. On this day alone the brigade suffered more than 650 casualties. On 2 December 1917, the brigade, which had suffered 1,665 casualties in two weeks of combat, was replaced in the first line by French troops.

On 15 June 1918, the brigade fought on the Monte Grappa during the Second Battle of the Piave River. Under heavy Austro-Hungarian attacks the brigade was forced to retreat to their second defensive line, but ultimately the brigade managed to stop the enemy advance at the cost of 2,729 casualties. On 2–3 July 1918, the brigade counterattacked and managed to retake the first defensive line. On 29 October 1918, during the Battle of Vittorio Veneto, the brigade attacked Austro-Hungarian positions on the Col della Berretta, but after suffering more than 830 casualties in a few hours the brigade retreated to its starting positions. On 30 October the brigade was taken out of the line and sent to Bassano del Grappa, where the news of the Armistice of Villa Giusti reached the brigade.

For the conquest of Col di Lana, their conduct and sacrifice on Cima Stradon and Piccolo Colbricon, and their bravery and sacrifice on Monte Tomba and Monfenera, the 59th Infantry Regiment and 60th Infantry Regiment were both awarded a Silver Medal of Military Valor. The medals were affixed to the flags of the two regiments and added to the regiments' coat of arms.

=== Interwar years ===
In 1922 the 59th Infantry Regiment moved from Civitavecchia to Rome and in 1926 the regiment returned from Rome to Civitavecchia. On 30 November 1926, the Brigade "Calabria" and the 60th Infantry Regiment were disbanded. The next day the 59th Infantry Regiment was renamed 59th Infantry Regiment "Calabria" and assigned to the XXX Infantry Brigade, which was the infantry component of the 30th Territorial Division of Cagliari. The XXX Infantry Brigade also included the 45th Infantry Regiment "Reggio" and 46th Infantry Regiment "Reggio", while 30th Territorial Division of Cagliari also included the 16th Field Artillery Regiment. In 1927, the regiment moved from Civitavecchia to La Maddalena in the North of Sardinia.

In 1933, the regiment moved from La Maddalena to Tempio Pausania. In 1934, the 30th Territorial Division of Cagliari was renamed Military Command Cagliari – 30th Infantry Division "Sabauda" and in September of the same year the Military Command Sassari – 31st Infantry Division "Caprera" was formed. The Military Command Cagliari was based in Cagliari and responsible for the South of the island of Sardinia, while the Military Command Sassari was based in Sassari and responsible for the island's North. The same month the XXXI Infantry Brigade "Caprera" was formed and assigned to the 31st Infantry Division "Caprera". The XXX Infantry Brigade "Sabauda" then transferred the 45th Infantry Regiment "Reggio" and 59th Infantry Regiment "Calabria" to the newly formed brigade. To bring the XXX Infantry Brigade "Sabauda" back up to strength the 60th Infantry Regiment "Calabria" was reformed in Iglesias with personnel drawn from the 45th, 46th, and 59th infantry regiments.

In 1935–36 the 59th Infantry Regiment "Calabria" provided seven officers and 225 troops to units deployed to East Africa for the Second Italo-Ethiopian War. On 15 April 1939, the 45th Infantry Regiment "Reggio" in Sassari and the 60th Infantry Regiment "Calabria" in Iglesias switched names. On 15 October 1939, the 31st Infantry Division "Caprera" was renamed 31st Infantry Division "Calabria", while the XXXI Infantry Brigade "Caprera" was disbanded, and the 59th Infantry Regiment "Calabria" and 60th Infantry Regiment "Calabria" came under direct command of the division. The division, which also included the 40th Artillery Regiment "Calabria", was tasked with the defense of the Northern half of Sardinia.

=== World War II ===
At the outbreak of World War II, the 59th Infantry Regiment "Calabria" consisted of a command, a command company, three fusilier battalions, a support weapons battery equipped with 65/17 infantry support guns, and a mortar company equipped with 81mm Mod. 35 mortars. The "Calabria" division and its regiments remained in Sardinia on coastal defense duty until the Armistice of Cassibile was announced on 8 September 1943. The next day, the "Calabria" division positioned itself to defend Sassari from an expected attack by the German 90th Panzergrenadier Division. However the Wehrmacht decided to evacuate its forces to Corsica. On 12–14 September 1943, the 59th Infantry Regiment "Calabria" skirmished with German forces at Bassacutena and Campovaglio, while the 60th Infantry Regiment "Calabria" engaged German forces at Littichedda, and Santa Teresa Gallura, in an attempt to speed up their withdrawal from the island.

The "Calabria" division then joined the Italian Co-belligerent Army and the 59th Infantry Regiment "Calabria" moved from Tempio Pausania to Sassari. On 25 September 1944, the division was reorganized as Internal Security Division "Calabria". On the same date the 59th Infantry Regiment "Calabria" was renamed 59th Internal Security Regiment "Calabria". For the rest of the war the regiment was tasked with the defence of Mediterranean Allied Air Forces airfields on Sardinia; as well as public security and demining.

=== Cold War ===
In 1945, the 59th Internal Security Regiment "Calabria" moved from Sassari to Cagliari. On 15 August 1946, the Internal Security Division "Calabria" was disbanded and its command used to form the Infantry Brigade "Calabria". On the same date the 59th and 60th internal security regiments were renamed 59th Infantry Regiment "Calabria" respectively 60th Infantry Regiment "Calabria". In early 1947, the 59th Infantry Regiment "Calabria" left the brigade and moved from Cagliari to Perugia and then in October of the same year to Palmanova in Friuli-Venezia Giulia, where the regiment joined the Infantry Division "Mantova". At the time the regiment consisted of a command, a command company, three fusilier battalions, and a mortar company.

On 30 November 1958, the regiment's III Fusilier Battalion and Mortar Company were disbanded. The following 2 December, the regiment formed a tank battalion in Visco with the personnel and equipment of the disbanded III Squadrons Group of the Regiment "Nizza Cavalleria" (1st). The battalion consisted of a command, a command company, and two tank companies with M47 Patton tanks. On 24 May 1961, the battalion was renamed LXIII Tank Battalion. On 1 January 1964, the regiment reformed its III Fusilier Battalion and on 1 March of the same year the LXIII Tank Battalion was transferred from the regiment to the Infantry Division "Mantova". On 25 January 1965, the regiment formed an anti-tank company and then consisted of the following units:

- 59th Infantry Regiment "Calabria", in Palmanova
  - Command and Services Company, in Palmanova
  - I Battalion, in Cormons
  - II Battalion, in Cividale
  - III Battalion, in Palmanova
  - Anti-tank Company, in Palmanova

During the 1975 army reform the army disbanded the regimental level and newly independent battalions were granted for the first time their own flags. On 31 October 1975, the 59th Infantry Regiment "Calabria" and the regiment's I and III battalions were disbanded. The next day the regiment's II Battalion in Cividale became an autonomous unit and was renamed 59th Mechanized Infantry Battalion "Calabria". The battalion was assigned to the Mechanized Brigade "Isonzo" and consisted of a command, a command and services company, three mechanized companies with M113 armored personnel carriers, and a heavy mortar company with M106 mortar carriers with 120mm Mod. 63 mortars. At the time the battalion fielded 896 men (45 officers, 100 non-commissioned officers, and 751 soldiers).

On 12 November 1976, the President of the Italian Republic Giovanni Leone assigned with decree 846 the flag and traditions of the 59th Infantry Regiment "Calabria" to the 59th Mechanized Infantry Battalion "Calabria". For its conduct and work after the 1976 Friuli earthquake the battalion was awarded a Silver Medal of Army Valor, which was affixed to the battalion's flag and added to the battalion's coat of arms.

In 1986 the Italian Army abolished the divisional level and brigades, which until then had been under one of the Army's four divisions, came under direct command of the Army's 3rd Army Corps or 5th Army Corps. As the Mechanized Division "Mantova" carried the traditions of the 104th Infantry Division "Mantova" and Combat Group "Mantova", which had both fought against the Germans during the Italian campaign of World War II the army decided to retain the name of the division. On 30 September 1986, the Mantova's division command in Udine was disbanded and the next day the command of the Mechanized Brigade "Isonzo" moved from Cividale del Friuli to Udine, where the command was renamed Mechanized Brigade "Mantova". The brigade retained the Isonzo's units, including the 59th Mechanized Infantry Battalion "Calabria".

With the end of the Cold War the Italian Army began to draw down its forces and the 59th Mechanized Infantry Battalion "Calabria" was reduced to a reserve unit in 1989. On 10 December 1989, the flag of the 59th Infantry Regiment "Calabria" was transferred to the Shrine of the Flags in the Vittoriano in Rome. On 30 June 1991, the 59th Mechanized Infantry Battalion "Calabria" was officially disbanded.
