= 63rd Tank Regiment (Italy) =

Inactive Italian Army tank unit

- 63° Reggimento Carri
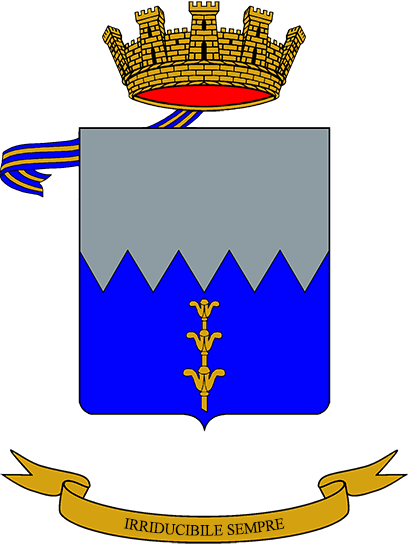
- Regimental coat of arms
- Active: 20 Oct. 1939 — 25 Jan. 1941; 24 May 1961 — 29 Nov. 1995
- Country: Italy
- Branch: Italian Army
- Part of: Mechanized Brigade "Mantova"
- Garrison/HQ: Cordenons
- Motto(s): "Irriducibile sempre"
- Anniversaries: 11 December 1940 - Battle of Buq Buq
- Decorations: 1x Bronze Medal of Army Valor

Insignia
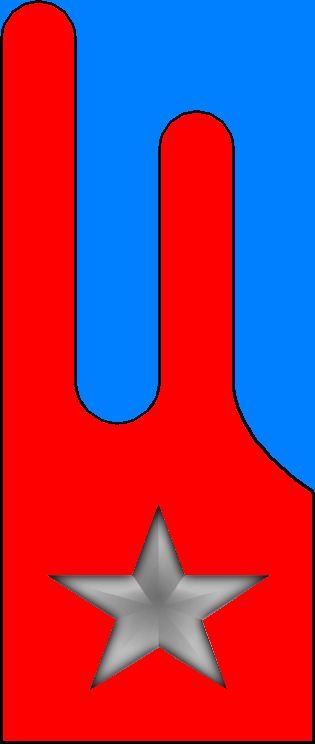
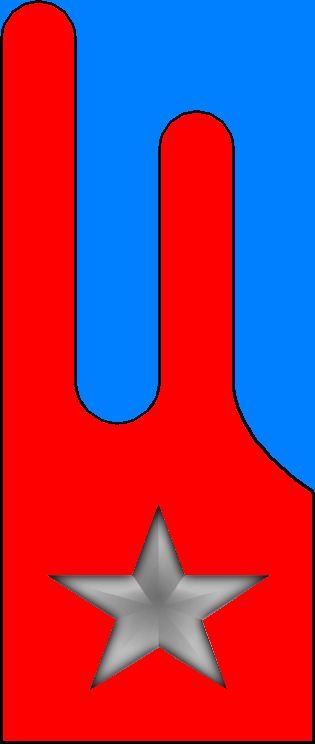
- Tank units gorget patches

The 63rd Tank Regiment (Italian: 63° Reggimento Carri) is an inactive tank regiment of the Italian Army, which was based in Cordenons in Friuli-Venezia Giulia and last operationally assigned to the 132nd Armored Brigade "Ariete". The unit's lineage traces back to the World War II LXIII Tank Battalion L, which in 1940 participated in the Italian invasion of Egypt. The battalion was destroyed in December 1940 during the British Operation Compass. In 1961, the battalion was reformed and assigned to the 59th Infantry Regiment "Calabria". In 1964, the battalion was transferred to the Infantry Division "Mantova". In 1975, the battalion was renamed 63rd Tank Battalion "M.O. Fioritto" and assigned to the Mechanized Brigade "Isonzo". In 1991, the battalion lost its autonomy and entered the newly formed 63rd Tank Regiment "M.O. Fioritto", which in 1992 was renamed 63rd Tank Regiment. In 1995, the regiment was transferred from the Mechanized Brigade "Mantova" to the 132nd Armored Brigade "Ariete", however at the end of the same year the regiment was disbanded.

Originally the unit, like all Italian tank units, was part of the army's infantry arm, but on 1 June 1999 the tankers specialty was transferred from the infantry arm to the cavalry arm. The regiment's anniversary falls on 10 December 1940, in memory of the Battle of Buq Buq on 10-11 December 1940, during which the LXIII Tank Battalion L fought to annihilation against the tank units of the British 7th Armoured Division.

== History ==
=== World War II ===
On 20 October 1939, the depot of the 158th Infantry Regiment "Cirene" in Marj in Libya formed a divisional tank battalion for the 63rd Infantry Division "Cirene". The battalion was equipped with obsolete L3/35 tankettes. On 20 May 1940, the battalion was designated LXIII Tank Battalion L (with L standing for Italian: "Leggero" or Light). In July 1940, the battalion was assigned to the 4th Tank Infantry Regiment. On 30 August 1940, the battalion was transferred to the 1st Tank Grouping of the Babini Group, with which it participated in the Italian invasion of Egypt. On 16 September 1940, the Italian formations reached the harbor of Sidi Barrani in Egypt and went on the defensive. The LXIII Tank Battalion L was assigned to the guard the logistic center at Buq Buq. On 9 December 1940, the British Western Desert Force commenced Operation Compass with an attack against the Italian positions at Sidi Barrani. On the same day, the LXIII Tank Battalion L was attached to the 64th Infantry Division "Catanzaro", which took up positions on the coastal road near Buq Buq. The next day, on 10 December 1940, units of the British 7th Armoured Division reached Buq Buq and the LXIII Tank Battalion L with its tankettes was overrun and heavily decimated by the superior British Matilda II and Cruiser tanks.

On 11 December 1940, the battalion's survivors retreated with the remnants of the 64th Infantry Division "Catanzaro" to Bardia. From there the survivors were transported to Tobruk, which came under siege by British forces on 6 January 1941. Due to a lack of fuel the battalion's few remaining L3/35 tankettes were buried in the sand as strong points. On 20 January 1941, the remnants of the battalion were assigned to the 4th Tank Infantry Regiment. On the same day, 20 January 1941, British forces attacked the Italian defensive lines around Tobruk and two days later the British forces captured the city. After the surrender of the Italian garrison of Tobruk, the LXIII Tank Battalion L was declared lost due to wartime events on 25 January 1941.

=== Cold War ===
On 2 December 1958, the III Tank Battalion was reformed in Visco with the personnel and equipment of the disbanded III Squadrons Group of the Regiment "Nizza Cavalleria" (1st). The battalion consisted of a command, a command company, and two tank companies with M47 Patton tanks. The battalion was assigned to the 59th Infantry Regiment "Calabria". On 24 May 1961, the battalion was renamed LXIII Tank Battalion. On 1 February 1963, the battalion formed a third tank company. On 1 March 1964, the battalion was transferred from the 59th Infantry Regiment "Calabria" to the Infantry Division "Mantova". On 31 July 1968, the battalion moved from Visco to Cordenons.

During the 1975 army reform the army disbanded the regimental level and newly independent battalions were granted for the first time their own flags, respectively in the case of cavalry units, their own standard. On 1 November 1975, the LXIII Tank Battalion was renamed 63rd Tank Battalion "M.O. Fioritto". As part of the reform tank and armored battalions were named for officers, soldiers and partisans of the tank speciality, who had served in World War II and been awarded Italy's highest military honor the Gold Medal of Military Valor. The 63rd Tank Battalion was named for Second Lieutenant Vincenzo Fioritto, who, as commanding officer of a platoon of the 4th Tank Infantry Regiment's depot, was killed in action on 10 September 1943 during the attempt to defend Rome against invading German forces.

The battalion was assigned to the Mechanized Brigade "Isonzo" and consisted of a command, a command and services company, and three tank companies with Leopard 1A2 main battle tanks. The battalion fielded now 434 men (32 officers, 82 non-commissioned officers, and 320 soldiers). On 12 November 1976, the President of the Italian Republic Giovanni Leone granted with decree 846 the 63rd Tank Battalion "M.O. Fioritto" its flag.

For its conduct and work after the 1976 Friuli earthquake the 63rd Tank Battalion "M.O. Fioritto" was awarded a Bronze Medal of Army Valor, which was affixed to the battalion's flag and added to the battalion's coat of arms.

In 1986, the Italian Army abolished the divisional level and brigades, which until then had been under one of the Army's four divisions, came under direct command of the Army's 3rd Army Corps or 5th Army Corps. As the Mechanized Division "Mantova" carried the traditions of the 104th Infantry Division "Mantova" and Combat Group "Mantova", which had both fought against the Germans during the Italian campaign of World War II the army decided to retain the name of the division. On 30 September 1986, the Mantova's division command in Udine was disbanded and the next day the command of the Mechanized Brigade "Isonzo" moved from Cividale del Friuli to Udine, where the command was renamed Mechanized Brigade "Mantova". The brigade retained the Isonzo's units, including the 63rd Tank Battalion "M.O. Fioritto".

=== Recent times ===
On 11 September 1991, the 63rd Tank Battalion "M.O. Fioritto" lost its autonomy and the next day the battalion entered the newly formed 63rd Tank Regiment "M.O. Fioritto". On 12 September 1992, the regiment was renamed 63rd Tank Regiment. On 1 August 1995, the regiment was transferred from the Mechanized Brigade "Mantova" to the 132nd Armored Brigade "Ariete".

In November 1995, the 132nd Tank Regiment in Aviano disbanded its companies. On 28 November 1995, the 63rd Tank Regiment transferred its flag to the Shrine of the Flags in the Vittoriano in Rome for safekeeping. The next day, on 29 November 1995, the flag of the 132nd Tank Regiment travelled from Aviano to Cordenons, where on the same date the 63rd Tank Regiment was disbanded. On 30 November 1995, the 132nd Tank Regiment assumed command of the personnel and equipment of the 63rd Tank Regiment in Cordenons.
