= Mechanized Brigade "Isonzo" =

Brigata Meccanizzata "Isonzo"
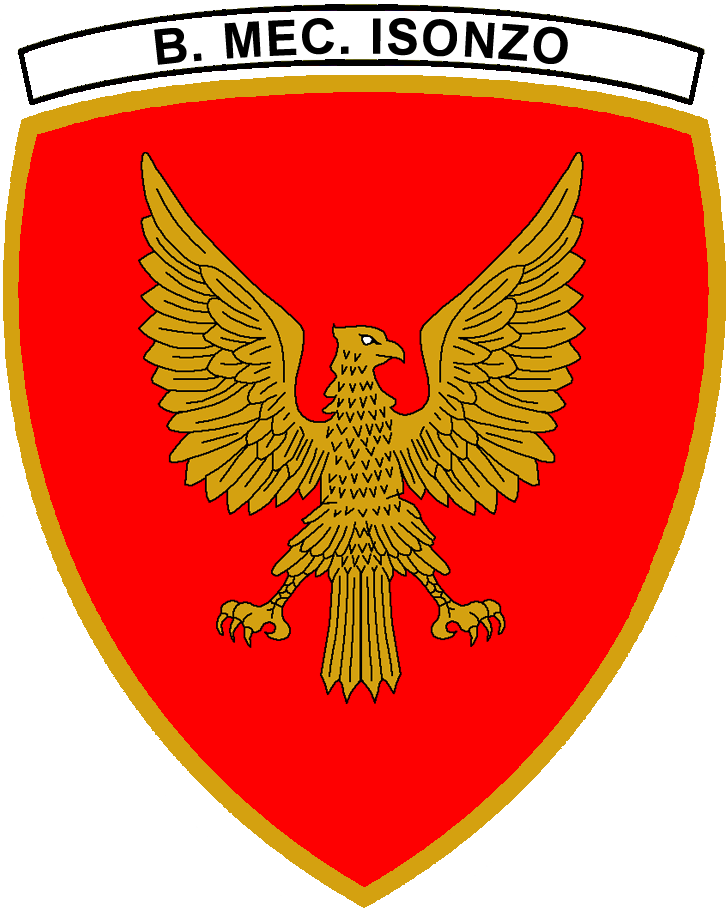
- Coat of Arms of the Mechanized Brigade "Isonzo"
- Active: 21 October 1975 - 1 October 1986
- Country: Italy
- Branch: Italian Army
- Type: Infantry
- Role: Mechanized Infantry
- Part of: Mechanized Division "Mantova"
- Garrison/HQ: Cividale del Friuli

The Mechanized Brigade "Isonzo" was a short-lived brigade of the Italian Army created during the 1975 army reform and renamed Mechanized Brigade "Mantova" during the 1986 army reform. The name of the brigade was chosen to commemorate the twelve Battles of the Isonzo during World War I.

== Activation ==
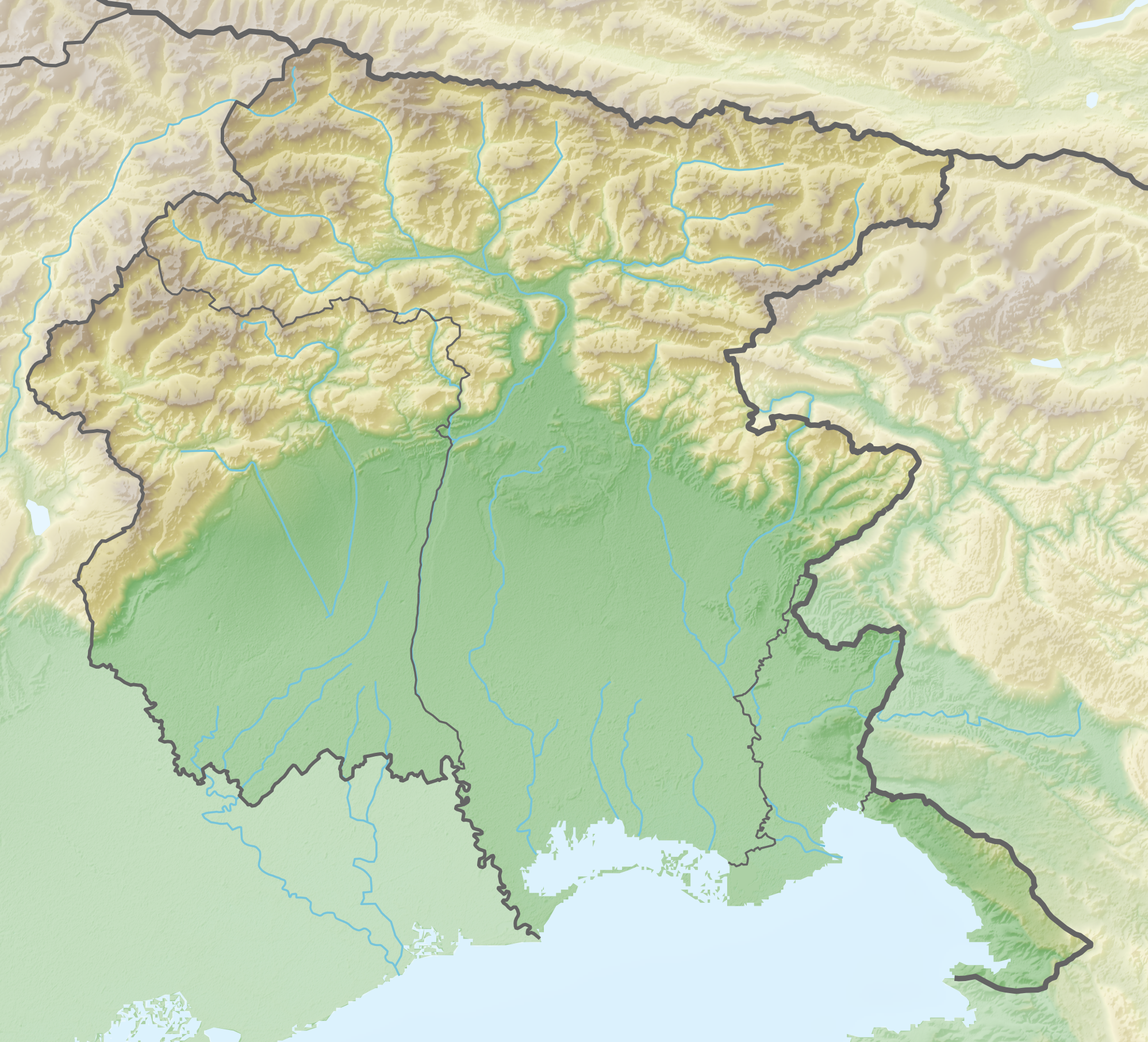
Isonzo units in 1976

In 1975 the Italian Army undertook a major reorganization of its forces: the regimental level was abolished and battalions came under direct command of multi-arms brigades. As tensions with Yugoslavia over the city if Trieste were allayed by the Treaty of Osimo and because of a reduction of military service from 15 to 12 months for army and air force and from 24 to 18 months for the navy, forced the army to reduce its forces by nearly 45,000 troops, it was decided that the units of the Infantry Division "Mantova" would contract to a single brigade. Therefore, most units of the Mantova were disbanded and on 21 October 1975 the remaining units of the division were used to raise the Mechanized Brigade "Isonzo" in Cividale del Friuli. The brigade's command was created by reorganizing and renaming the command of the 76th Infantry Regiment "Napoli" in Cividale del Friuli. After the activation the "Isonzo" brigade entered the Mechanized Division "Mantova" and consisted of the following units.

- Mechanized Brigade "Isonzo", in Cividale del Friuli
  - Command and Signal Unit "Isonzo", in Cividale del Friuli
  - 63rd Tank Battalion "M.O. Fioritto", in Cordenons (Leopard 1A2 main battle tanks)
  - 52nd Infantry Fortification Battalion "Alpi", in Attimis (former I Battalion, 52nd Infantry Regiment "Alpi", fielded 12x companies)
  - 59th Mechanized Infantry Battalion "Calabria", in Cividale del Friuli (former II Battalion, 59th Infantry Regiment "Calabria")
  - 76th Mechanized Infantry Battalion "Napoli", in Cividale del Friuli (former I Battalion, 76th Infantry Regiment "Napoli")
  - 114th Mechanized Infantry Battalion "Moriago", in Tricesimo (former II Battalion, 114th Infantry Regiment "Mantova")
  - 120th Infantry Fortification Battalion "Fornovo", in Ipplis (former III Battalion, 52nd Infantry Regiment "Alpi", fielded 13x companies)
  - 28th Field Artillery Group "Livorno", in Tricesimo (M114 155mm towed howitzers) (former IV Heavy Field Artillery Group, 5th Field Artillery Regiment)
  - Logistic Battalion "Isonzo", in Tricesimo
  - Anti-tank Company "Isonzo", in Tarcento (BGM-71 TOW anti-tank guided missiles)
  - Engineer Company "Isonzo", in Tarcento

The brigade was tasked with defending the central part of the Yugoslav-Italian border against a possible Warsaw Pact invasion with the Alpine Brigade "Julia" on its left flank and the Mechanized Brigade "Gorizia" on its right flank.

== Deactivation ==
In 1986 the Italian Army abolished the divisional level and brigades, which until then had been under one of the Army's four divisions, came under direct command of the Army's 3rd or 5th Army Corps. As the Mechanized Division "Mantova" carried the traditions of the 104th Infantry Division "Mantova" and Combat Group "Mantova", which both had fought against the Germans during the Italian campaign of World War II the army decided retain the name of the division. On 30 September 1986 Mantova's division command in Udine was disbanded and the next day the command of the Mechanized Brigade "Isonzo" moved from Cividale del Friuli to Udine, where the command was renamed Mechanized Brigade "Mantova". The brigade retained the Isonzo's units, which changed their names from Isonzo to Mantova on the same date.
