= 28th Artillery Regiment "Livorno" =

Inactive Italian Army artillery unit

- 28° Reggimento Artiglieria "Livorno"
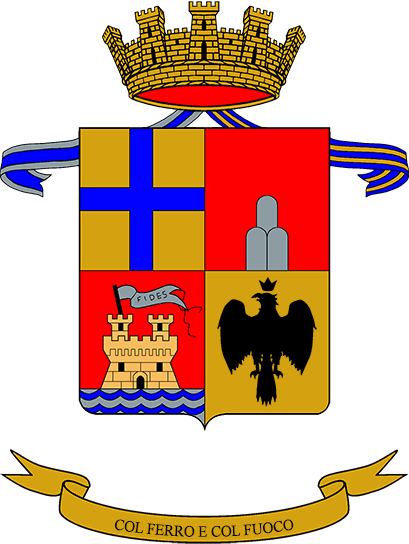
- Regimental coat of arms
- Active: 1 March 1912 — 1 Aug. 1920; 10 Nov. 1926 — 9 Sept. 1943; 1 Nov. 1975 — 31 Oct. 1995
- Country: Italy
- Branch: Italian Army
- Part of: Mechanized Brigade "Mantova"
- Garrison/HQ: Tarcento
- Motto: "Col ferro e col fuoco"
- Anniversaries: 15 June 1918 - Second Battle of the Piave River
- Decorations: 1x Silver Medal of Military Valor; 1x Silver Medal of Army Valor

Insignia
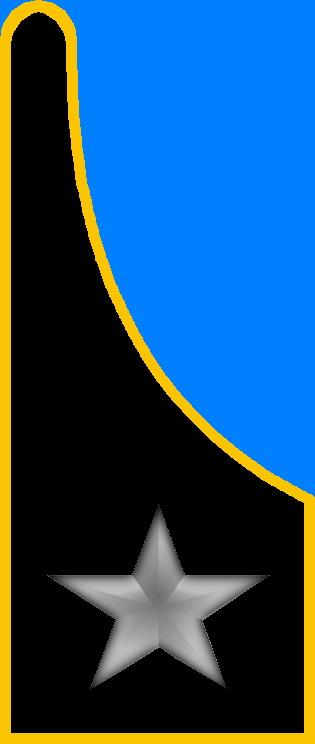
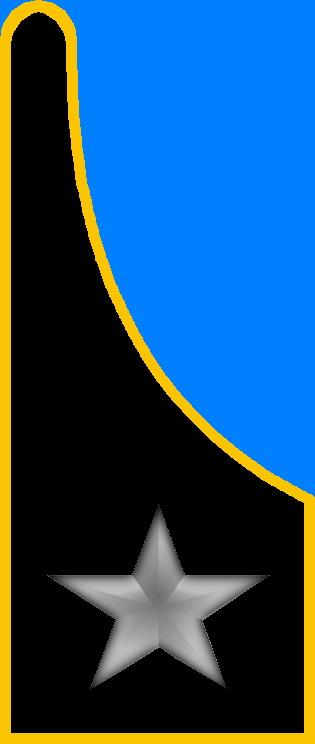
- Regimental gorget patches

The 28th Artillery Regiment "Livorno" (Italian: 28° Reggimento Artiglieria "Livorno") is an inactive field artillery regiment of the Italian Army, which was based in Tarcento in Friuli-Venezia Giulia. Originally an artillery regiment of the Royal Italian Army, the regiment was formed in 1912 and served in World War I on the Italian front. After the war, the regiment was disbanded. In 1926 the regiment was reformed and in 1935 it was assigned to the 4th Infantry Division "Livorno". The division was deployed in Sicily, when the Allied landings began on 10 July 1943. In early August the remnants of the division were evacuated from Sicily and the regiment was in the process of being reformed, when German forces disbanded the division and its regiment after the Armistice of Cassibile was announced on 8 September 1943.

In 1975 unit was reformed as 28th Field Artillery Group "Livorno" and assigned to the Mechanized Brigade "Isonzo". In 1993 the group was reorganized as a regiment and in 1995 the regiment was disbanded. The regimental anniversary falls, as for all Italian Army artillery regiments, on June 15, the beginning of the Second Battle of the Piave River in 1918.

== History ==
On 1 March 1912 the 28th Field Artillery Regiment was formed in Parma with five batteries ceded by the 4th Field Artillery Regiment (4th and 5th battery) and the 21st Field Artillery Regiment (6th, 7th, and 8th battery). The ceded batteries had participated in the First, Second, and Third Italian War of Independence. In 1911-12 the regiment provided for the Italo-Turkish War three officers and 63 troops for units deployed to Libya.

=== World War I ===
At the outbreak of World War I, the regiment was assigned, together with the Brigade "Modena" and Brigade "Salerno", to the 8th Division. At the time the regiment consisted of a command, three groups with a combined eight batteries equipped with 75/27 mod. 06 field guns, and a depot. During the war the regiment's depot in Parma formed the commands of the 10th Heavy Field Artillery Grouping and 17th Heavy Field Artillery Grouping, as well as the XV, XIX, XXXVIII, and XLIV Heavy Howitzers Field Groups. The depot also formed twelve heavy field batteries and two siege batteries.

During the war the regiment served on the Italian front, where it fought in May 1915 on Mrzli Vrh and during the summer on Krn and at Tolmin. During winter 1915-16 the regiment was on Monte Vodil, before returning to Mrzli Vrh. In 1917 the regiment was deployed again on Mrzli Vrh before being destroyed in the Battle of Caporetto. The regiment was reformed and during the decisive Battle of Vittorio Veneto in October 1918 the regiment was initially arrayed on Monte Grappa.

On 1 August 1920, the regiment was disbanded and its units and base were transferred to the 21st Field Artillery Regiment.

=== Interwar years ===
On 10 November 1926, the 28th Field Artillery Regiment was reformed in Cuneo. The regiment was assigned to the 4th Territorial Division of Cuneo and consisted of a command, a command unit, the I Group with 100/17 mod. 14 howitzers, the II Group with 75/27 mod. 06 field guns, and a depot. The I Group had been transferred from the 1st Mountain Artillery Regiment, while the II Group had been transferred from the 9th Field Artillery Regiment. On 9 May 1927, the regiment added the III and IV groups with mule-carried 75/13 mod. 15 mountain guns. In January 1935, the 4th Territorial Division of Cuneo changed its name to 4th Infantry Division "Monviso" and the artillery regiment was renamed 28th Artillery Regiment "Monviso". During the Second Italo-Ethiopian War the regiment's III Group with mule-carried 75/13 mod. 15 mountain guns was deployed to the Italian Islands of the Aegean. On 5 April 1939, the division changed its name to 4th Infantry Division "Livorno" and the regiment was renamed 28th Artillery Regiment "Livorno". On 3 April of the same year, the regiment ceded its II Group with 75/27 mod. 06 field guns to the reformed 36th Artillery Regiment "Forlì" of the 36th Infantry Division "Forlì".

=== World War II ===
On 10 June 1940, the day Italy entered World War II, the regiment consisted of a command, a command unit, a group with 100/17 mod. 14 howitzers, two groups with 75/13 mod. 15 mountain guns, an anti-aircraft battery with 20/65 mod. 35 anti-aircraft guns, and a depot. In June 1940, the Livorno division, which also included the 33rd Infantry Regiment "Livorno" and 34th Infantry Regiment "Livorno", participated in the Italian invasion of France. The division crossed the border on 15 June and advanced to La Bollène-Vésubie.

In November 1940 the regiment transferred its 75/13 mod. 15 mountain guns to the 48th Artillery Regiment "Taro" and consisted then of a command, a command unit, two groups with 100/17 mod. 14 howitzers, a group with 75/27 mod. 06 field guns, an anti-aircraft battery with 20/65 mod. 35 anti-aircraft guns, and a depot. In March and April 1942, the division was reorganized as an auto-transportable division of the North-African type and the regiment now consisted of a command, a command unit, two groups with 75/18 mod. 34 mountain guns, three anti-aircraft batteries with 20/65 mod. 35 anti-aircraft guns, and a depot. On 15 April of the same year, the regiment's depot in Cuneo formed the 157th Artillery Regiment "Novara" for the 157th Infantry Division "Novara" and the regiment transferred its group with 100/17 mod. 14 howitzers and its group with 75/27 mod. 06 field guns to the new regiment.

From 19 May to 15 July 1942, the regiment included the DLIV Self-propelled Group with 75/18 self-propelled guns, which had been formed by the 131st Artillery Regiment "Centauro". By fall 1942, the division and its regiments were deployed in the Southern part of Sicily as mobile reserve of the XVI Army Corps. In November 1942 the regiment received the LXXXVI Group with 100/17 mod. 14 howitzers and LXXXVII Group with 100/17 mod. 14 howitzers from the Guardia alla Frontiera. On 1 July 1943, nine days before the Allied invasion of Sicily commenced, the regiment fielded in Sicily a command, a command unit, the I and II groups with 100/17 mod. 14 howitzers, the III and IV groups with 75/18 mod. 34 mountain guns, and three anti-aircraft batteries with 20/65 mod. 35 anti-aircraft guns.

On 10 July 1943, Allied forces landed on the Southern coast of Sicily and the division counterattacked at Gela. By 15 July Allied armored units threatened to encircle the division and it retreated to the Simeto river south of Catania. The division then retreated towards Messina, from where the division's remnants were evacuated to mainland Italy in early August 1943. In early September 1943, the regiment's survivors returned to Cuneo to begin the process of reforming the regiment, but after the announcement of the Armistice of Cassibile on 8 September 1943 the regiment was disbanded by the invading German forces on 9 September 1943.

For its conduct and sacrifice on Sicily the regiment was awarded a Silver Medal of Military Valor, which was affixed to the regiment's flag and is depicted on the regiment's coat of arms.

=== Cold War ===
During the 1975 army reform, the army disbanded the regimental level and newly independent battalions and groups were granted for the first time their own flags. On 31 October 1975, the IV Group of the 5th Field Artillery Regiment became an autonomous unit and the next day the group was renamed 28th Field Artillery Group "Livorno". The group was based in Tricesimo and assigned to the Mechanized Brigade "Isonzo". It consisted of a command, a command and services battery, and three batteries with M114 155 mm towed howitzers.

On 12 November 1976, the President of the Italian Republic Giovanni Leone assigned with decree 846 the flag and traditions of the 28th Artillery Regiment "Livorno" to the group. At the time the group fielded 485 men (37 officers, 58 non-commissioned officers, and 390 soldiers).

For its conduct and work after the 1976 Friuli earthquake the group was awarded a Silver Medal of Army Valor, which was affixed to the group's flag and added to the group's coat of arms. In 1979 the group moved from Tricesimo to Tarcento. In 1986 the group was equipped with M109G 155 mm self-propelled howitzers and changed its name on 31 July of the year to 28th Self-propelled Field Artillery Group "Livorno".

In 1986, the Italian Army abolished the divisional level and brigades, which until then had been under one of the Army's four divisions, came under direct command of the Army's 3rd Army Corps or 5th Army Corps. As the Mechanized Division "Mantova" carried the traditions of the 104th Infantry Division "Mantova" and Combat Group "Mantova", which had both fought against the Germans during the Italian campaign of World War II the army decided to retain the name of the division. On 30 September 1986 the Mantova's division command in Udine was disbanded and the next day the command of the Mechanized Brigade "Isonzo" moved from Cividale del Friuli to Udine, where the command was renamed Mechanized Brigade "Mantova". The brigade retained the Isonzo's units, including the 28th Self-propelled Field Artillery Group "Livorno".

=== Recent times ===
On 4 October 1993, the 28th Self-propelled Field Artillery Group "Livorno" lost its autonomy and the next day the group entered the 28th Self-propelled Field Artillery Regiment "Livorno". On 26 October 1995 the flag of the 28th Artillery Regiment "Livorno" was returned to the Shrine of the Flags in the Vittoriano in Rome and on 31 October the 28th Self-propelled Field Artillery Regiment "Livorno" was disbanded.
