= 76th Infantry Regiment "Napoli" =

Inactive Italian Army infantry unit

- 76° Reggimento Fanteria "Napoli"
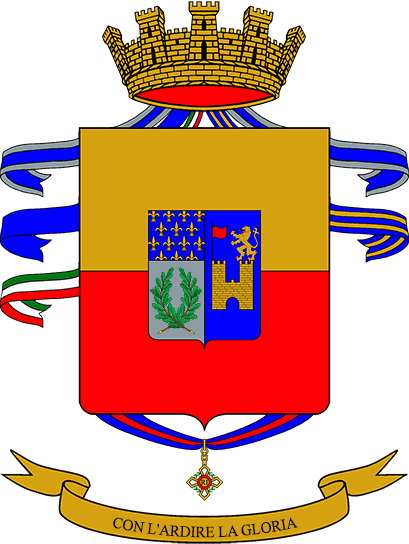
- Regimental coat of arms
- Active: 16 April 1861 – 18 Nov. 1926; 11 Feb. 1935 – 10 March 1935; 20 May 1937 – 31 July 1997
- Country: Italy
- Branch: Italian Army
- Garrison/HQ: Cividale
- Motto: "Con l'ardire la gloria"
- Anniversaries: 23 July 1918 – Battle of Méry-Prémecy
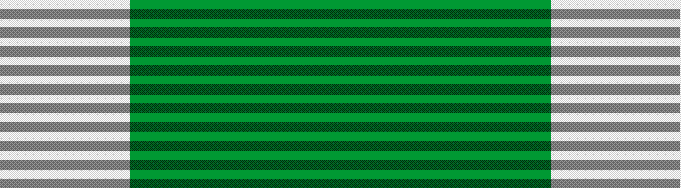
- Decorations: 1× Military Order of Italy; 2× Silver Medals of Military Valor; 1× Bronze Medal of Military Valor; 1× Silver Medal of Army Valor; 1× Silver Medal of Civil Valor; 1× Silver Medal of Merit

Insignia
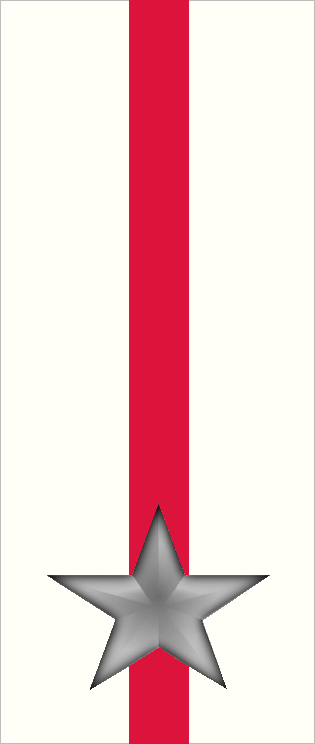
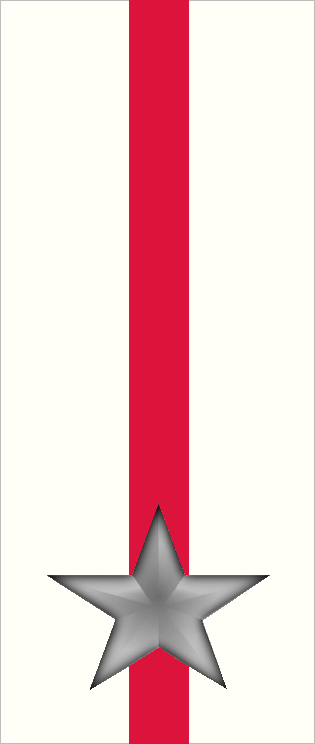
- Regimental gorget patches

The 76th Infantry Regiment "Napoli" (Italian: 76° Reggimento Fanteria "Napoli") is an inactive unit of the Italian Army last based in Cividale. The regiment is named for the city of Naples and part of the Italian Army's infantry arm.

The regiment was formed 1861 as a Grenadier regiment, but was transferred to the line infantry in 1871. In 1866 the regiment fought in the Third Italian War of Independence. In World War I the regiment fought on the Italian front and the Western Front in France. The regiment was disbanded in 1926 and reformed for a short spell in 1935. Reformed again in May 1937 the regiment was assigned during World War II to the 54th Infantry Division "Napoli". In July 1943 the Napoli division fought in the Allied invasion of Sicily, during which the division and most of its units were destroyed. The survivors of the division were assigned to the regiment, which was in Calabria when the Armistice of Cassibile was announced on 8 September 1943. The regiment then joined the Italian Co-belligerent Army and was assigned to the Combat Group "Mantova", which was part of the British Eighth Army during the Italian Campaign. After the war the regiment was based along the Italian-Yugoslav border. In 1975 the regiment was reduced to a battalion sized unit, which in 1992 was reformed as regiment. In 1995 the regiment was disbanded.

== History ==
=== Formation ===
In 1859, after the conclusion of the Second Italian War of Independence, the Austro-Hungarian Empire was forced to cede the Western half of the Kingdom of Lombardy–Venetia, the region of Lombardy, to the Second French Empire, which transferred the region to the Kingdom of Sardinia. In 1861, after Giuseppe Garibaldi's Expedition of the Thousand the Kingdom of Sardinia annexed the Kingdom of the Two Sicilies, which allowed the Sardinians to proclaim the Kingdom of Italy on 17 March 1861.

With the Unification of Italy nearly complete the Royal Italian Army began to form new regiments in the annexed territories. On 16 April 1861 the 1st Grenadier Regiment and 2nd Grenadier Regiment of the Grenadiers of Sardinia Brigade ceded each one battalion to help form the 5th Grenadier Regiment (Grenadiers of Naples Brigade). On the same date the 3rd Grenadier Regiment and 4th Grenadier Regiment of the Grenadiers of Lombardy Brigade ceded each one battalion to help form the 6th Grenadier Regiment (Grenadiers of Naples Brigade). The 5th Grenadier Regiment was mustered and initially based in Livorno, while the 6th Grenadier Regiment was mustered and initially based in Florence.

On 1 August 1862 the 5th Grenadier Regiment ceded its 17th Company and 18th Company to help form the 7th Grenadier Regiment (Grenadiers of Tuscany Brigade), while the 6th Grenadier Regiment ceded its 17th Company and 18th Company to help form the 8th Grenadier Regiment (Grenadiers of Tuscany Brigade). After the formation of the 7th and 8th grenadier regiments of the Grenadiers of Tuscany Brigade the army the Royal Italian Army fielded eight grenadier regiments, which all consisted of a staff and three battalions, with six grenadier companies per battalion.

In 1861–70 detachments of the regiment operated in southern Italy to suppress the anti-Sardinian revolt, which had erupted after the Kingdom of Sardinia had annexed the Kingdom of Two Sicilies. In 1866 the brigade participated in the Third Italian War of Independence.

On 1 April 1871 the Grenadiers of Naples Brigade and its two regiments were transferred from the Grenadiers speciality to the line infantry. On the same date the brigade was renamed Brigade "Napoli", and its two regiments became the 75th Infantry Regiment and 76th Infantry Regiment. On 25 October of the same year the brigade level was abolished and the two regiments of the Brigade "Napoli" were renamed 75th Infantry Regiment "Napoli", respectively 76th Infantry Regiment "Napoli".

On 2 January 1881 the brigade level was reintroduced and the two regiments were renamed again as 75th Infantry Regiment (Brigade "Napoli") and 76th Infantry Regiment (Brigade "Napoli").

On 1 November 1884 the regiment ceded some of its companies to help form the 93rd Infantry Regiment (Brigade "Messina") in Gaeta. In 1887 the regiment's 4th Company participated in the Italo-Ethiopian War of 1887–1889. In 1895–96 the regiment provided nine officers and 270 enlisted for units deployed to Italian Eritrea for the First Italo-Ethiopian War. In December 1908, the regiment was deployed to the area of the Strait of Messina for the recovery efforts after the 1908 Messina earthquake. For its service the regiment was awarded a Silver Medal of Merit, which was affixed to the regiment's flag. In 1911–12 the regiment provided 7 officers and 493 enlisted to augment units fighting in the Italo-Turkish War.

=== World War I ===
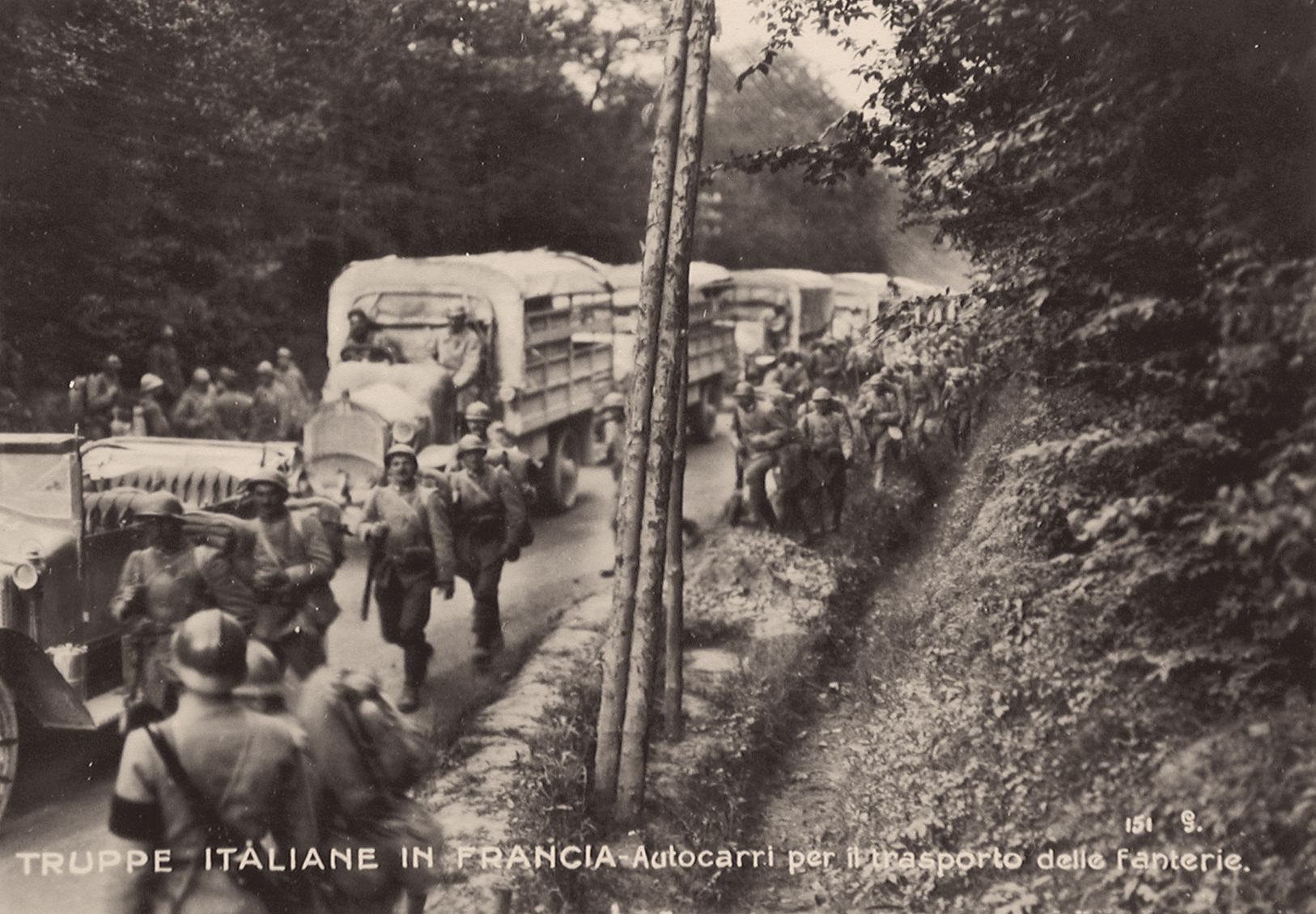
Italian II Army Corps infantry in France in 1918

At the outbreak of World War I, the Brigade "Napoli" formed, together with the Brigade "Piemonte" and the 36th Field Artillery Regiment, the 24th Division. At the time the 76th Infantry Regiment consisted of three battalions, each of which fielded four fusilier companies and one machine gun section. On 20 April 1915 the regimental depot of the 76th Infantry Regiment formed the 147th Infantry Regiment (Brigade "Caltanissetta"). After Italy's entry into the war on 23 May 1915 the Brigade "Napoli" was deployed to the Italian front: in June 1915 the brigade fought against Austro-Hungarian forces in the First Battle of the Isonzo on Monte Sabotino. In October of the same year the brigade was on the Karst plateau, where it fought in the Third Battle of the Isonzo on the slopes of Monte Sei Busi and in Cave di Selz. In May and June 1916 the brigade operated in the Monfalcone sector and again in the area of Cave di Selz. In July 1916 the brigade operated at San Grado di Merna and in August it fought in the Sixth Battle of the Isonzo on Nad Logem. In November 1916 the brigade fought in the Ninth Battle of the Isonzo. In August 1916 the 75th Infantry Regiment was awarded a Silver Medal of Military Valor for the regiment's conduct at Monfalcone in June, and in December 1916 the 76th Infantry Regiment was awarded a Bronze Medal of Military Valor for its conduct at Monfalcone in June and at San Grado di Merna in November.

In September 1917 the brigade fought in the Eleventh Battle of the Isonzo on the Banjšice plateau. In October 1917, during the Italian defeat in the Battle of Caporetto, the brigade fought at Zagradan Pass and on Bukova Ježa. The swift Austro-Hungarian and German advance forced the brigade to retreat to the Piave river. In the violent fighting and during the retreat the brigade lost 3,987 officers and soldiers of the approximately 6,000 men the brigade had at the beginning of the battle.

After Caporetto the brigade was rebuilt and in April 1918 assigned to the II Army Corps, which was deployed to the Western Front in France. There the brigade operated in May in the Argonne sector and in June in the Bois de Vrigny area. In July the brigade fought in the Second Battle of the Marne at Bligny and Méry-Prémecy. In fall of 1918 the brigade participated in the Hundred Days Offensive and fought at Chemin des Dames. For their conduct in France the two regiments of the Brigade "Napoli" were both awarded a Silver Medal of Military Valor.

=== Interwar years ===
On 18 November 1926 the brigade command and the 76th Infantry Regiment were disbanded, while the 75th Infantry Regiment, now renamed 75th Infantry Regiment "Napoli", was assigned on the next day to the XXIX Infantry Brigade, which was the infantry component of the 29th Territorial Division of Messina. In 1934, the 29th Territorial Division of Messina changed its name to 29th Infantry Division "Peloritana". A name change that also extended to the division's infantry brigade.

=== Second Italo-Ethiopian War ===
In February 1935 the 29th Infantry Division "Peloritana", including the 75th Infantry Regiment "Napoli", was shipped to Somalia for the Second Italo-Ethiopian War. As replacement for the 75th Infantry Regiment "Napoli" the regiment's depot in Syracuse reformed on 11 February 1935 the 76th Infantry Regiment "Napoli". The regiment was assigned to the CXXIX Infantry Brigade "Peloritana II", but already on 10 March 1935 the 76th Infantry Regiment "Napoli" was renamed 146th Infantry Regiment "Catania".

On 20 May 1937 the 76th Infantry Regiment "Napoli" was reformed in Trapani as replacement for the 85th Infantry Regiment "Verona", which had moved to in Gharyan in Libya, where the 85th Verona joined the newly formed 60th Infantry Division "Sabratha". The 76th Infantry Regiment "Napoli" was assigned to the XXVIII Infantry Brigade "Vespri" of the 28th Infantry Division "Vespri".

On 15 April 1939 the 54th Infantry Division "Napoli" was formed in Caltanissetta. On the same date the 75th Infantry Regiment "Napoli" and 76th Infantry Regiment "Napoli" were transferred to the division. The same year the 76th Infantry Regiment "Napoli" moved from Trapani to Agrigento.

=== World War II ===
==== Sicilian Campaign ====
At the outbreak of World War II the regiment consisted of a command, a command company, three fusilier battalions, a support weapons battery equipped with 65/17 infantry support guns, and a mortar company equipped with 81mm Mod. 35 mortars. The division was based in the southern part of Sicily and remained there until the Allied invasion of Sicily on 10 July 1943. On 12 July 1943 British forces captured Floridia and most of the 75th Infantry Regiment as it was attempting to withdraw from the town. By 13 July 1943 an Allied landing north of Augusta outflanked the division, and inflicted heavy casualties. The destruction continued on 14 July 1943, as remnants of division fought a rear-guard action at Scordia. It has been estimated that the division lost up to eighty-percent of its effectiveness soon after its initial contact with British forces. On 25 July 1943 the division tried to reform at Linguaglossa, but it became apparent that its cut-off subunits had either been destroyed or captured. Around this time the 75th Infantry Regiment "Napoli" was declared lost due to wartime events. The division's remaining personnel was ordered to move to Messina, from where the it was evacuated to Southern Italy on 11–14 August 1943. The division was disbanded on 14 August 1943 in Melia southeast of Scilla in Calabria with the few survivors grouped into the 76th Infantry Regiment "Napoli".

For its conduct between 10 July and 1 August in Sicily the 76th Infantry Regiment was awarded a Silver Medal of Military Valor.

==== Italian Campaign ====
After the announcement of the Armistice of Cassibile on 8 September 1943 the regiment remained loyal to King Victor Emmanuel III and joined the Italian Co-belligerent Army. On 30 October 1943 the regiment was assigned to the 104th Infantry Division "Mantova" and the process of rebuilding the regiment's battalions began. On 1 October 1944 the Mantova was renamed Combat Group "Mantova" and equipped with British materiel. In spring 1945 the combat group joined the British Eighth Army for the Italian campaign, but soon afterwards the German forces in Italy surrendered.

=== Cold War ===
On 15 October 1945 the Combat Group "Mantova" was renamed Infantry Division "Mantova". Initially the division was based in Liguria with the 76th Infantry Regiment "Napoli" based in Savona. When the Treaty of Paris between Italy and the Allied Powers came into effect on 15 September 1947 the division moved to the Friuli region to take possession of the territories returned to Italy and the regiment moved from Savona to Udine. At the time the regiment consisted of a command, a command company, three fusilier battalions, a mortar company equipped with 81mm Mod. 35 mortars, and an anti-tank cannons company equipped with QF 6-pounder anti-tank guns.

In 1953 the regiment moved from Udine to Cividale. In 1963 the regiment was sent to Longarone to help rescue efforts after the Vajont dam disaster. For its conduct in Longarone the regiment was awarded a Silver Medal of Civil Valor.

During the 1975 army reform the Italian Army disbanded the regimental level and newly independent battalions were granted for the first time their own flags. On 31 October 1975 the 76th Infantry Regiment "Napoli" and three of its four battalions were disbanded. The next day the regiment's I Battalion in Cividale was renamed 76th Mechanized Infantry Battalion "Napoli" and assigned the flag and traditions of the 76th Infantry Regiment "Napoli". The battalion consisted of a command, a command and services company, three mechanized companies with M113 armored personnel carriers, and a heavy mortar company with M106 mortar carriers with 120mm Mod. 63 mortars. At the time the battalion fielded 896 men (45 officers, 100 non-commissioned officers, and 751 soldiers).

On 1 November 1975 the personnel of the regimental command of the 76th Infantry Regiment "Napoli" formed the command of the Mechanized Brigade "Isonzo" in the city of Cividale. On the same date the 76th Mechanized Infantry Battalion "Napoli" was assigned to the brigade, which in turn was assigned to the Mechanized Division "Mantova".

For its conduct and work after the 1976 Friuli earthquake the battalion was awarded a Silver Medal of Army Valor, which was affixed to the battalion's flag and added to the battalion's coat of arms.

In 1986 the Italian Army abolished the divisional level and brigades, which until then had been under one of the Army's four divisions, came under direct command of the Army's 3rd Army Corps or 5th Army Corps. As the Mechanized Division "Mantova" carried the traditions of the 104th Infantry Division "Mantova" and Combat Group "Mantova", which had both fought against the Germans during the Italian campaign of World War II the army decided to retain the name of the division. On 30 September 1986 the Mantova's division command in Udine was disbanded and the next day the command of the Mechanized Brigade "Isonzo" moved from Cividale del Friuli to Udine, where the command was renamed Mechanized Brigade "Mantova". The brigade retained the Isonzo's units, including the 76th Mechanized Infantry Battalion "Napoli".

=== Recent times ===
On 5 August 1992 the 76th Mechanized Infantry Battalion "Napoli" lost its autonomy and the next day the battalion entered the reformed 76th Infantry Regiment "Napoli" as I Mechanized Battalion.

On 31 July 1995 the 76th Infantry Regiment "Napoli" was disbanded after it had transferred its flag to the Shrine of the Flags in the Vittoriano in Rome on 30 July.

== Bibliography ==
- Cloutier, Patrick (2013). Regio Esercito: The Italian Royal Army in Mussolini's Wars, 1935–1943. lulu.com. ISBN 978-1105074011.
