= Mechanized Brigade "Mantova" =

Brigata Meccanizzata "Mantova"
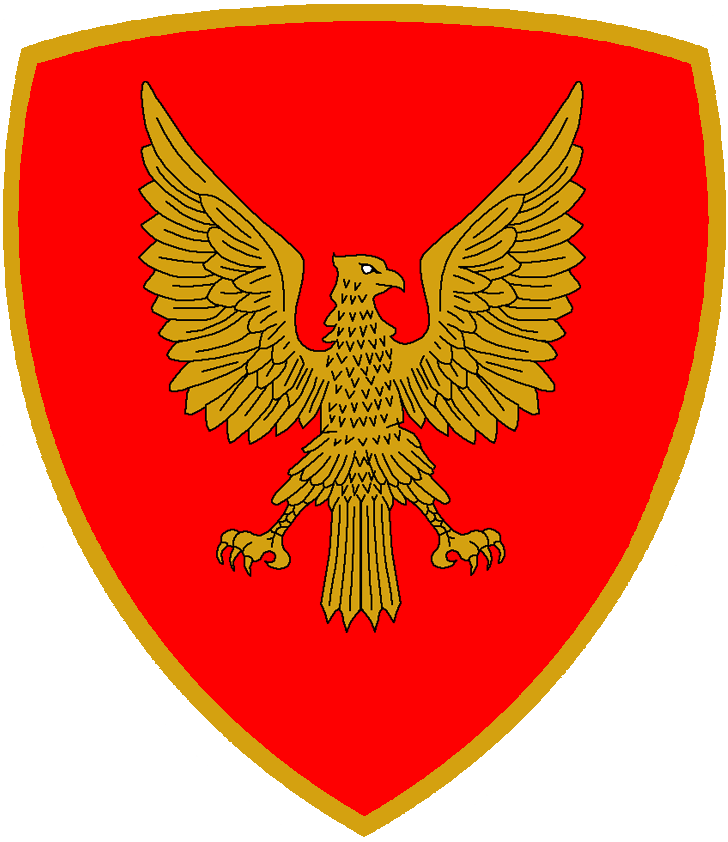
- Coat of Arms of the Mechanized Brigade "Mantova"
- Active: 1 March 1915 - 1919; 1 October 1986 - 30 August 1997; 1 January 2003 – 15 July 2013
- Country: Italy
- Branch: Italian Army
- Type: Infantry
- Role: Mechanized Infantry
- Part of: 5th Army Corps
- Garrison/HQ: Cividale del Friuli

The Mechanized Brigade "Mantova" was a mechanized brigade of the Italian Army. Its core units were mechanized infantry battalions. The brigade's headquarters was in the city of Udine and all the brigade's units were based in the region of Friuli-Venezia Giulia. In 2003, the "Mantova" was raised again as a division command.

== History ==
=== First World War ===
The "Mantova" Brigade was activated on 1 March 1915 in preparation for Italy's entry into the World War I. Initially the brigade consisted of the 113th and 114th infantry regiment and was the 1st Army's reserve infantry formation. During the first year of the war the brigade was employed on the borders of Trentino. In 1916 it became part of the 37th Territorial Division and fought in the Battle of Asiago. Afterwards the brigade was transferred to the 57th Territorial Division and moved to the area of Redipuglia. In 1917 the brigade was again on the heavily contested Asiago plateau. In 1918, the brigade participated in the Battle of the Piave River near Nervesa and in the Vittorio Veneto. In November 1919 the brigade was disbanded.

=== Second World War ===
On 15 March 1942, the 104th Infantry Division "Mantova" was raised in Verona with the re-activated 113th Infantry Regiment "Mantova" and 114th Infantry Regiment "Mantova" and the 11th Artillery Regiment "Monferrato". At first the division was based in Piedmont, then in Apulia and Calabria. After allied forces had landed on the Italian peninsula and an armistice between Italy and the Allies had been signed, the division stayed loyal to the King of Italy Victor Emmanuel III.

On 26 September 1943, the division ceded part of the 11th Artillery Regiment "Monferrato" to help form the Italian 1st Motorized Group under command of the 58th Infantry Division "Legnano", which was to aid in the allied war effort. On 16 October its 113th Infantry Regiment joined the US Fifth Army and on 30 October 1943 the division received the 76th Infantry Regiment "Napoli" as a replacement for the 113th.

In spring 1944 the division received the remnants of the 155th Infantry Division "Emilia" after it had been repatriated from combat against German forces in Kotor. At that point the division consisted of the following units:

- 76th Infantry Regiment "Napoli"
- 114th Infantry Regiment "Mantova"
- 119th Infantry Regiment "Emilia"
- 155th Artillery Regiment "Emilia"
- I Group/11th Artillery Regiment "Monferrato"

At the beginning of fall 1944 the division was ordered to re-organize as a Combat Group destined for the frontlines in central Italy. The 76th and 114th infantry regiments and 155th Artillery Regiment were brought up to strength and equipped with British materiel. By spring 1945 the combat group was ready to join the British Eighth Army, but it arrived at the front just as the German forces had surrendered.

=== Cold War ===
==== Infantry Division "Mantova" ====
On 15 October 1945 Combat Group "Mantova" regained its old name, Infantry Division "Mantova", and was garrisoned in Varazze on the Ligurian coast. In May 1947 the division was transferred to the city of Udine in north-eastern Italy, where it formed together with the Infantry Division "Folgore" the first line of defence towards Yugoslavia. On 16 September 1947 the division's 114th Infantry Regiment "Mantova" was given the honour of being the first Italian military unit to enter the city of Gorizia after it was returned to Italian control. One week later. The same year the 18th Anti-tank Field Artillery Regiment and the 4th Light Anti-aircraft Artillery Regiment were assigned to the division. On 23 September 1949, the division was joined by the 59th Infantry Regiment "Calabria" and 5th Field Artillery Regiment. At the time the "Mantova" division was part of the Italian 5th Military Territorial Command. In the following years, the division repeatedly gained and lost minor units, but its core units - 59th, 76th and 114th infantry regiments, and 5th and 155th artillery regiments - remained in place. In the 1960s the division added the 52nd Fortification Infantry Regiment "Alpi", the LXIII Tank Battalion with M47 Patton tanks and the VI Cavalry Reconnaissance Group "Lancieri di Aosta" to its ranks, but lost the 155th Artillery Regiment in the process.

By 1974, the division had been full motorized and consisted of:

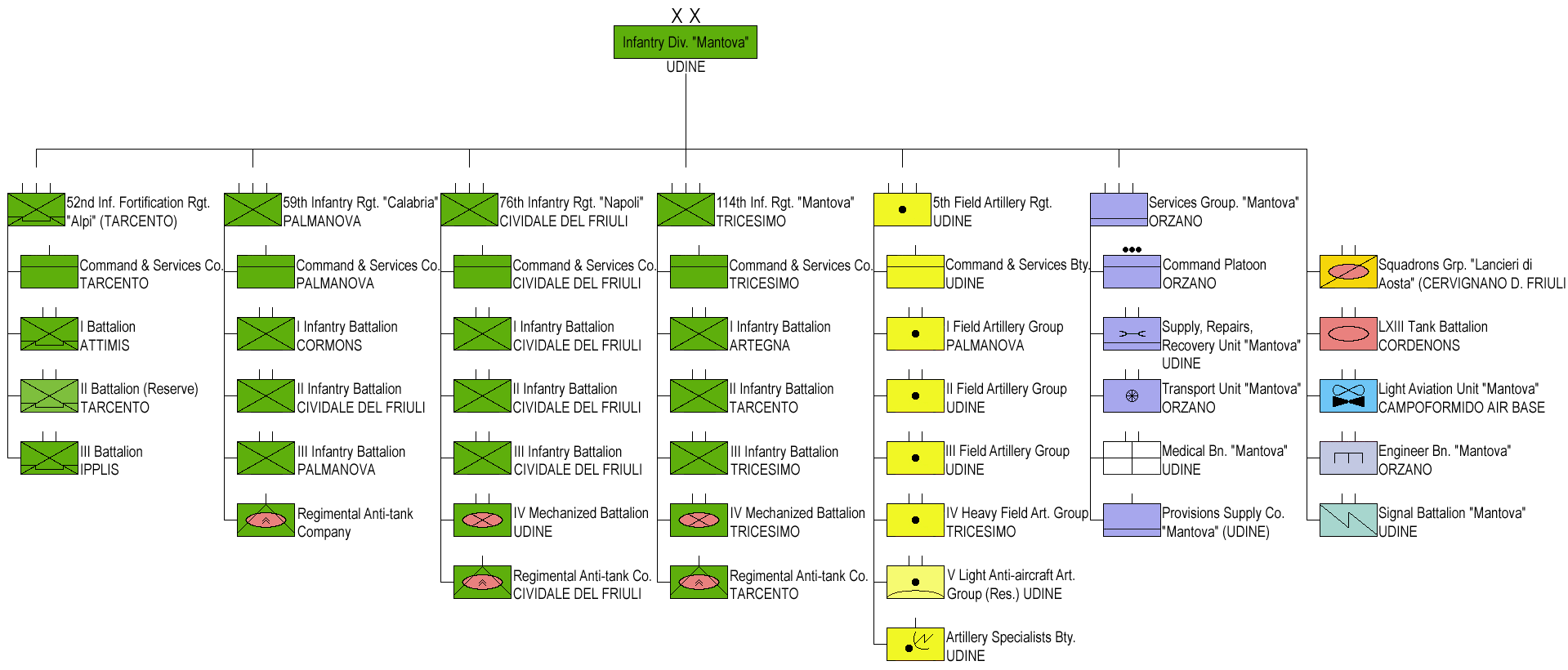
Infantry Division "Mantova" in 1974

- Infantry Division "Mantova", in Udine
  - 52nd Fortification Infantry Regiment "Alpi", in Tarcento
    - Command and Services Company, in Tarcento
    - I Battalion, in Attimis / Tarcento / Grupignano
    - II Battalion (Reserve), in Tarcento
    - III Battalion, in Ipplis / Purgessimo
  - 59th Infantry Regiment "Calabria", in Palmanova
    - Command and Services Company, in Palmanova
    - I Infantry Battalion, in Cormons
    - II Infantry Battalion, in Cividale del Friuli
    - III Infantry Battalion, in Palmanova
    - Regimental Anti-tank Company, in (?) (anti-tank guided missiles and M47 tanks)
  - 76th Infantry Regiment "Napoli", in Cividale del Friuli
    - Command and Services Company, in Cividale del Friuli
    - I Infantry Battalion, in Cividale del Friuli
    - II Infantry Battalion, in Cividale del Friuli
    - III Infantry Battalion, in Cividale del Friuli
    - IV Mechanized Battalion, in Udine (M113 armored personnel carriers and M47 tanks)
    - Regimental Anti-tank Company, in Cividale del Friuli (anti-tank guided missiles and M47 tanks)
  - 114th Infantry Regiment "Mantova", in Tricesimo
    - Command and Services Company, in Tricesimo
    - I Infantry Battalion, in Artegna
    - II Infantry Battalion, in Tarcento
    - III Infantry Battalion, in Tricesimo
    - IV Mechanized Battalion, in Tricesimo (M113 armored personnel carriers and M47 tanks)
    - Regimental Anti-tank Company, in Tarcento (anti-tank guided missiles and M47 tanks)
  - 5th Field Artillery Regiment, in Udine
    - Command and Services Battery, in Udine
    - I Field Artillery Group, in Palmanova (M14/61 105 mm towed howitzers)
    - II Field Artillery Group, in Udine (M14/61 105mm towed howitzers)
    - III Field Artillery Group, in Udine (M14/61 105mm towed howitzers)
    - IV Heavy Field Artillery Group, in Tricesimo (M114 155 mm towed howitzers)
    - V Light Anti-aircraft Artillery Group (Reserve), in Udine (Bofors 40 mm anti-aircraft guns and 12.7mm anti-aircraft machine guns)
    - Artillery Specialists Battery, in Udine
  - "Lancieri di Aosta" Squadrons Group, in Cervignano del Friuli (Fiat Campagnola reconnaissance vehicles and M47 Patton tanks)
  - LXIII Tank Battalion, in Cordenons (M47 Patton tanks)
  - Light Aviation Unit "Mantova", at Udine-Campoformido Air Base (L-19E Bird Dog light aircraft and AB 206 reconnaissance helicopters)
  - Engineer Battalion "Mantova", in Orzano di Remanzacco
  - Signal Battalion "Mantova", in Udine
  - Services Grouping "Mantova", in Orzano di Remanzacco
    - Command Platoon, in Orzano di Remanzacco
    - Supply, Repairs, Recovery Unit "Mantova", in Udine
    - Transport Unit "Mantova", in Orzano di Remanzacco
    - Medical Battalion "Mantova", in Udine
    - Provisions Supply Company "Mantova", in Udine

==== Mechanized Division "Mantova" ====
In 1975 the Italian Army undertook a major reorganization of its forces: the regimental level was abolished and battalions came under direct command of multi-arms brigades. As tensions with Yugoslavia over the city of Trieste were allayed by the Treaty of Osimo and because a reduction of the military service from 15 to 12 months for the army and air force and from 24 to 18 months for the navy, forced the army to reduce its forces by nearly 45,000 troops, it was decided that the units of the Infantry Division "Mantova" would contract to brigade. Therefore, during 1975 most units of the "Mantova" division were either disbanded or reorganized and on 21 October 1975 the remaining units of the division were used to raise the Mechanized Brigade "Isonzo" in Cividale del Friuli. To bring the division back to full strength it received the newly formed Mechanized Brigade "Brescia" in Brescia and the Armored Brigade "Pozzuolo del Friuli" in Palmanova. By the end of the year the division consisted of the following units.

- Mechanized Division "Mantova", in Udine
  - Command Unit "Mantova", in Udine
  - Divisional Artillery Command, in Udine
    - 5th Heavy Self-propelled Field Artillery Group "Superga", in Udine (M109G 155 mm self-propelled howitzers; former II Self-propelled Field Artillery Group, 5th Field Artillery Regiment; M109 replaced with FH70 155 mm towed howitzers in 1981)
    - 155th Heavy Self-propelled Field Artillery Group "Emilia", in Udine (M109G 155mm self-propelled howitzers; former III Self-propelled Field Artillery Group, 5th Field Artillery Regiment; M109 replaced with FH70 155mm towed howitzers in 1981)
    - Artillery Specialists Group "Mantova", in Udine (raised by merging the Command and Services, and Artillery Specialists batteries of the 5th Field Artillery Regiment)
    - 12th Light Anti-aircraft Artillery Group "Nibbio" (Reserve), in Udine
  - Mechanized Brigade "Brescia", in Brescia
  - Mechanized Brigade "Isonzo", in Cividale del Friuli
  - Armored Brigade "Pozzuolo del Friuli", in Palmanova
  - 7th Squadrons Group "Lancieri di Milano", in Remanzacco (M47 Patton tanks, M113 armored personnel carriers and AR59 Campagnola reconnaissance vehicles, transferred from the Infantry Division "Legnano")
  - 11th Infantry Battalion "Casale" (Recruits Training), in Casale Monferrato (former I Battalion, 11th Infantry Regiment "Casale", transferred from the Northwestern Military Region)
  - 104th Engineer Battalion "Torre", in Orzano di Remanzacco (former Engineer Battalion "Mantova")
  - 107th Signal Battalion "Predil", in Udine (former Signal Battalion "Mantova")
  - Logistic Battalion "Mantova", in Orzano di Remanzacco (former Services Grouping "Mantova")
  - 48th Reconnaissance Helicopters Squadrons Group "Pavone", at Udine-Campoformido Air Base
    - Command and Services Squadron
    - 481st Reconnaissance Helicopters Squadron (AB 206 reconnaissance helicopters)
    - 482nd Reconnaissance Helicopters Squadron (AB 206 reconnaissance helicopters)
  - Medical Battalion "Mantova" (Reserve), in Orzano di Remanzacco

==== Mechanized Brigade "Mantova" ====
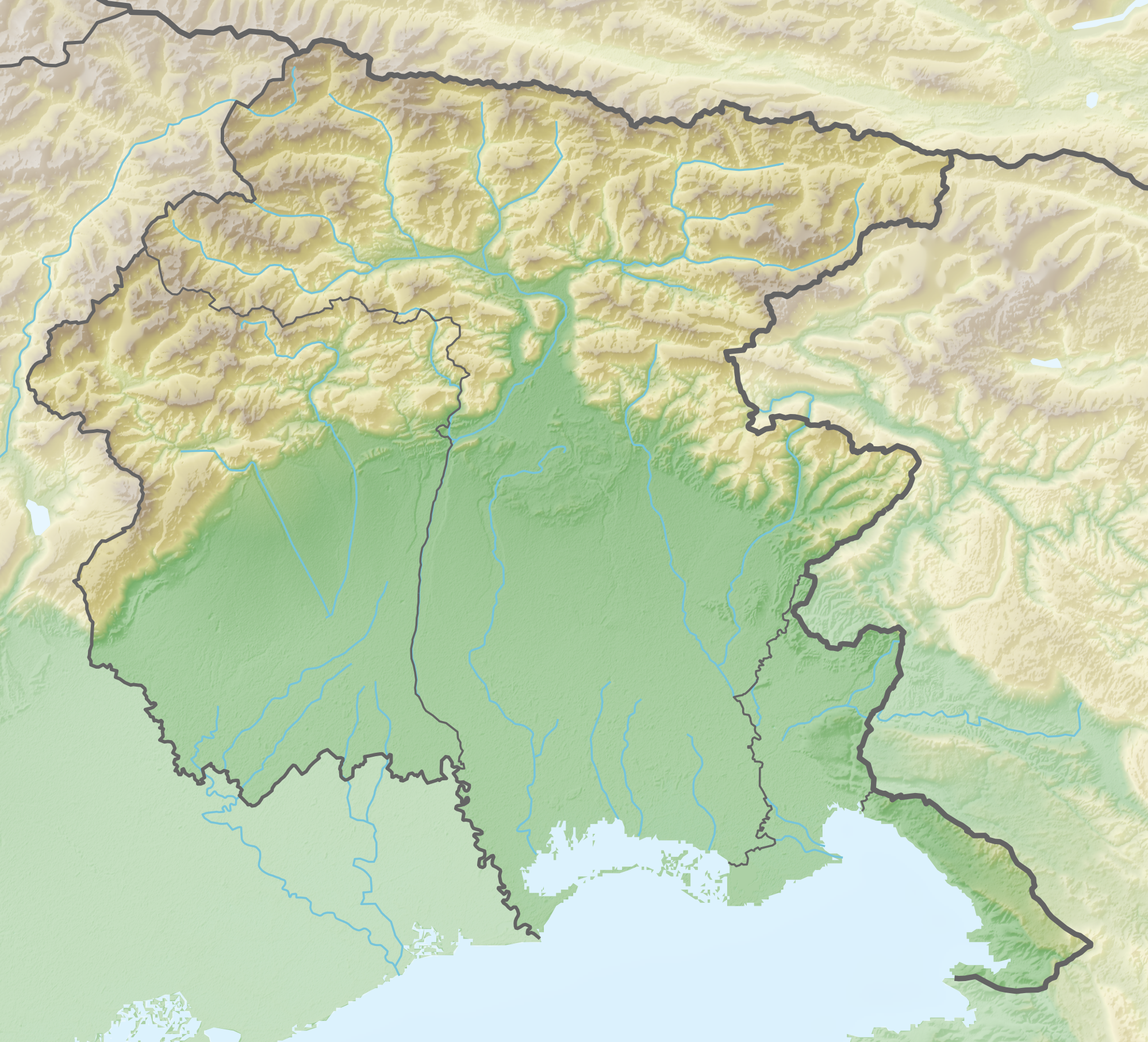
Mantova units in 1989

In 1986 the Italian Army abolished the divisional level and brigades, that until then had been under one of the Army's four divisions, came forthwith under direct command of the Army's 3rd Army Corps or 5th Army Corps. As the Mechanized Division "Mantova" carried a historically significant name, the division ceased to exist on 30 September in Udine, but the next day in the same location the Mechanized Brigade "Mantova" was activated. The new brigade took command of the units of the Mechanized Brigade "Isonzo", whose name was stricken from the roll of active units of the Italian Army. The "Mantova" brigade then consisted of the following units:

- Mechanized Brigade "Mantova", in Udine
  - Command and Signal Unit "Mantova", in Udine
  - 63rd Tank Battalion "M.O. Fioritto", in Cordenons
  - 52nd Infantry Fortification Battalion "Alpi", in Attimis (from the disbanded Mechanized Division "Mantova")
  - 59th Mechanized Infantry Battalion "Calabria", in Cividale del Friuli
  - 76th Mechanized Infantry Battalion "Napoli", in Cividale del Friuli
  - 114th Mechanized Infantry Battalion "Moriago", in Tricesimo
  - 120th Fortification Infantry Battalion "Fornovo", in Ipplis
  - 28th Self-propelled Field Artillery Group "Livorno", in Tarcento
  - Logistic Battalion "Mantova", in Tricesimo
  - Anti-tank Company "Mantova", in Tarcento
  - Engineer Company"Mantova", in Remanzacco

After the end of the Cold War, the Italian Army began a massive drawdown of its forces. At the same time the battalions returned to use the name regiment for traditional reasons:

- on 30 June 1991 the 59th Infantry Battalion "Calabria" was disbanded
- on 30 November 1991 the 120th Infantry Battalion "Fornovo" was disbanded
- on 31 March 1993 the 52nd Fortification Infantry Regiment "Alpi" was disbanded
- on 31 July 1995 the 63rd Tank Regiment was transferred to the 132nd Armored Brigade "Ariete"
- on 31 October 1995 the 114th Infantry Regiment "Mantova" and 28th Self-propelled Field Artillery Regiment "Livorno" were disbanded
- on 30 October 1996 the 82nd Infantry Regiment "Torino" from the disbanded Mechanized Brigade "Gorizia" joined the "Mantova"
- on 31 July 1997 the 76th Infantry Regiment "Napoli" was disbanded

The brigade itself was disbanded on 30 August 1997 and the last unit under its command, the 82nd Infantry Regiment "Torino", joined the 132nd Armored Brigade "Ariete".

== Today ==
In 2002 the Italian Army raised three division commands, with one of the three always readily deployable for NATO missions. The army decided that each division should carry the name and traditions of one of the divisions that served with distinction in World War II. Therefore, on 31 December 2002 the 2nd Italian Division in Vittorio Veneto was renamed as Division Command "Mantova".
