= 21st Field Artillery Regiment "Trieste" =

Active Italian Army field artillery unit

- 21° Reggimento Artiglieria Terrestre "Trieste"
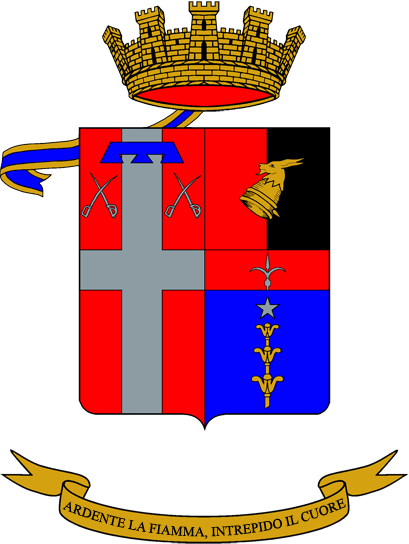
- Regimental coat of arms
- Active: 1 November 1888 – 12 May 1943; 1 Oct. 1950 – 20 Oct. 1960; 18 Sept. 1975 – today
- Country: Italy
- Branch: Italian Army
- Part of: Mechanized Brigade "Pinerolo"
- Garrison/HQ: Foggia
- Mottos: "Ardente la fiamma, intrepido il cuore"
- Anniversaries: 15 June 1918 – Second Battle of the Piave River
- Decorations: 1× Gold Medal of Military Valor; 1× Silver Cross of Army Merit

Insignia
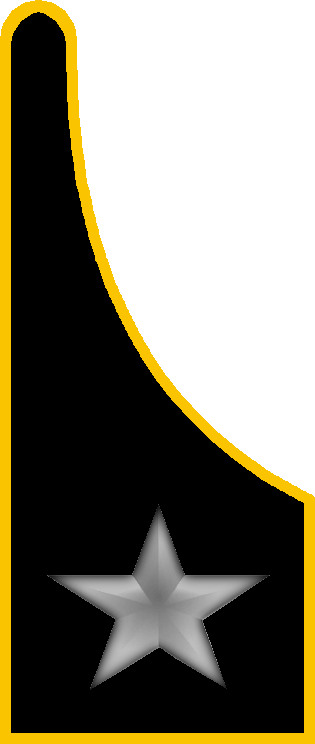
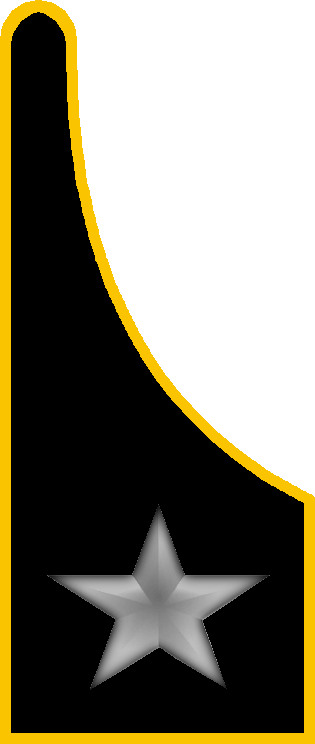
- Regimental gorget patches

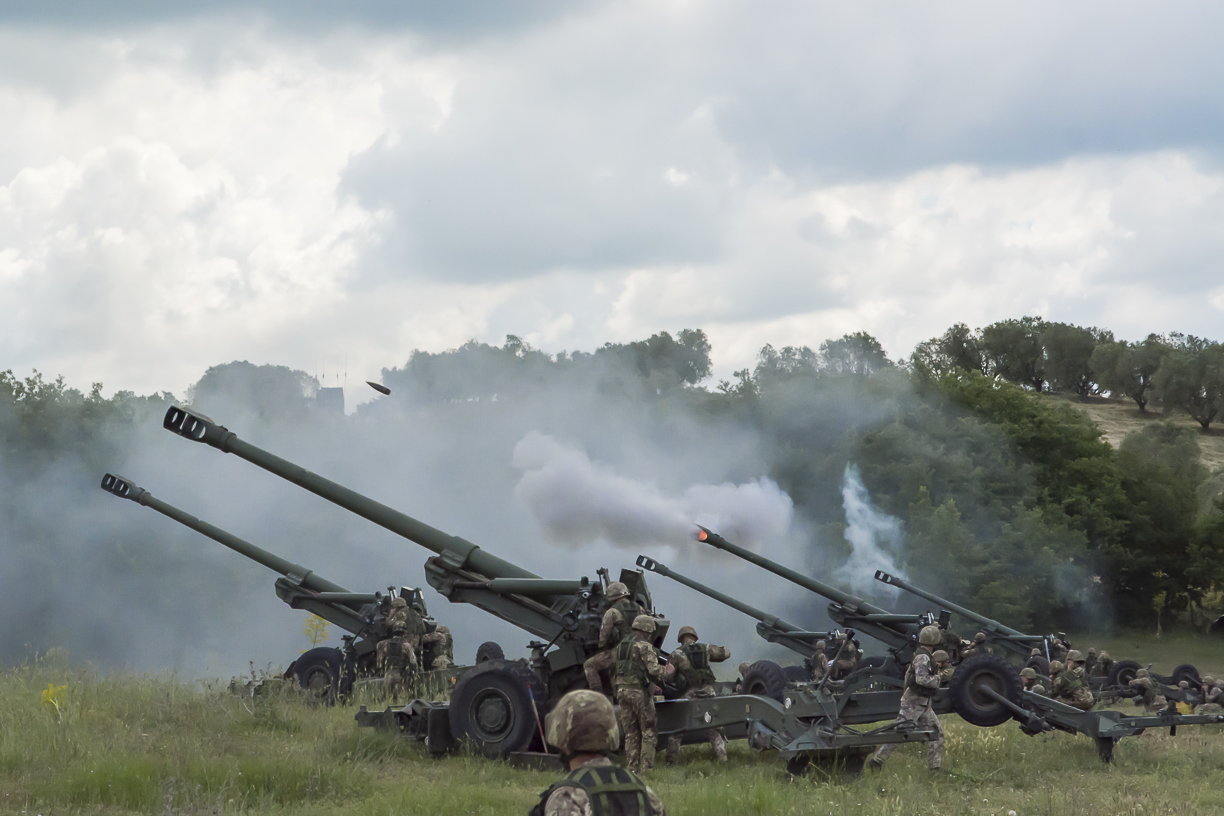
A battery of the 21st "Trieste" during maneuvers

The 21st Field Artillery Regiment "Trieste" (Italian: 21° Reggimento Artiglieria Terrestre "Trieste") is a field artillery regiment of the Italian Army. Today the regiment is based in Foggia in Apulia and assigned to the Mechanized Brigade "Pinerolo". Originally an artillery regiment of the Royal Italian Army, the regiment was formed in 1888 and served in World War I on the Italian front. In 1935 the regiment was assigned to the 8th Infantry Division "Po", which in 1939 was renamed 101st Motorized Division "Trieste". The division participated in the Greco-Italian War, fought in the Western Desert campaign and was forced to surrender to allied forces on 12 May 1943 at the end of the Tunisian campaign.

The regiment was reformed in 1950 and assigned to the Infantry Division "Trieste", which in 1960 was reduced to Infantry Brigade "Trieste". The same year the regiment was disbanded and its flag transferred to the Shrine of the Flags in the Vittoriano in Rome. On 18 September 1975 the Field Artillery Group "Trieste" was renamed 21st Field Artillery Group "Romagna" and assigned the flag and traditions of the 21st Artillery Regiment "Trieste". The group was assigned to the Mechanized Brigade "Trieste". In 1991 group was equipped with M109G self-propelled howitzers and renamed 21st Self-propelled Field Artillery Group "Romagna". The same year the group was assigned to the Mechanized Brigade "Friuli". In 1993 the group was reorganized as 21st Self-propelled Field Artillery Regiment "Trieste", which in 2001 was transferred to the Mechanized Brigade "Pinerolo". The regimental anniversary falls, as for all Italian Army artillery regiments, on June 15, the beginning of the Second Battle of the Piave River in 1918.

== History ==
On 1 November 1888 the 21st Field Artillery Regiment was formed in Piacenza. The new regiment consisted of eight batteries and one train company ceded by the 9th Field Artillery Regiment. One of the ceded batteries had participated in the First Italian War of Independence, during which it fought in the Battle of Novara in 1849. Two of the ceded batteries had been part of the Sardinian expeditionary corps in the Crimean War and fought in Crimea in 1855–56. The same two batteries participated in the Second Italian War of Independence, during which they fought in the Battle of Solferino in 1859. Three of the ceded batteries had participated in the Piedmontese invasion of Central and Southern Italy in 1860–61 and then in the Third Italian War of Independence in 1866, and one of the batteries had participated in the capture of Rome in 1870.

In 1895–96 the regiment provided one officer and 134 troops for the formation of a mortar battery and for other units deployed to Eritrea for the First Italo-Ethiopian War. During the Italo-Turkish War in 1911–12 the regiment formed the command of a Special Field Artillery Regiment, which was sent with one of the regiment's group commands and three of the regiment's batteries to Libya. The regiment also provided 260 troops to other deployed units. On 1 March 1912 the regiment ceded its III Group to help form the 28th Field Artillery Regiment.

=== World War I ===
At the outbreak of World War I the regiment was assigned, together with the Brigade "Bergamo" and Brigade "Valtellina", to the 7th Division. At the time the regiment consisted of a command, three groups with a combined eight batteries equipped with 75/27 mod. 11 field guns, and a depot. During the war the regiment's depot formed part of the 57th Field Artillery Regiment. During the war the regiment was deployed from 1915 to 1917 in the Tolmin sector. After the Battle of Caporetto the remnants of the regiment retreated with the Italian armies to the Piave, where the regiment fought on Monte Tomba in the Monte Grappa sector during the Second Battle of the Piave River. During the Battle of Vittorio Veneto the regiment fought on Monte Tomba, at Monfenera and then advanced to Istrana.

On 1 August 1920 the 21st Field Artillery Regiment in Piacenza was disbanded an on the same date the 28th Field Artillery Regiment in Milan changed its number to 21st and received the traditions of the disbanded regiment. In 1924 the regiment returned from Milan to Piacenza. In 1926 the 21st Field Artillery Regiment was assigned to the 8th Territorial Division of Piacenza and consisted of a command, one group with 100/17 mod. 14 howitzers, two groups with 75/27 mod. 11 field guns, one group with mule-carried 75/13 mod. 15 mountain guns, and a depot.

=== Second Italo-Ethiopian War ===
In January 1935 the division was renamed 8th Infantry Division "Po" and consequently the regiment changed its name to 21st Artillery Regiment "Po". In February 1935 the regiment mobilized its IV Group with mule-carried 75/13 mod. 15 mountain guns for the Second Italo-Ethiopian War. The group was attached for the duration of the war to the 19th Artillery Regiment "Gavinana". The regiment then formed a new IV Group with 65/17 mod. 13 mountain guns, which in June 1935 was sent to East Africa for the war. In July 1935 the regiment formed a new IV Group with 75/13 mod. 15 mountain guns. On 15 January 1936 the regiment was motorized and renamed 21st Motorized Division Artillery Regiment "Po". The regiment consisted now of a command, a command unit, the I Group with 100/17 mod. 14 howitzers, and the II and III groups with 75/27 mod. 11 field guns.

In February 1936 the regiment's I Group with 100/17 mod. 14 howitzers was mobilized and transferred to East Africa for the war. The regiment then formed a new I Group with 100/17 mod. 14 howitzers. In July 1936 the IV Group with mule-carried 75/13 mod. 15 mountain guns, which had been attached to the 19th Artillery Regiment "Gavinana", returned from the war and was disbanded. On 1 April 1939 the 8th Infantry Division "Po" was renamed 101st Motorized Division "Trieste" and consequently the regiment changed its name to 21st Artillery Regiment "Trieste".

=== World War II ===
On 10 June 1940, the day Italy entered World War II, the regiment consisted of a command, command unit, one group with 100/17 mod. 16 howitzers, two groups with 75/27 mod. 06 field guns, and an anti-aircraft battery with 20/65 mod. 35 anti-aircraft guns. The regiment was assigned to the 101st Motorized Division "Trieste", which also included the 65th Infantry Regiment "Trieste" and 66th Infantry Regiment "Trieste", which were all based in southern Albania. In November 1940 the division's command and the 21st Artillery Regiment "Trieste" were sent to Albania to shore up the crumbling Italian forces during the Greco-Italian War. The division's command formed the Special Alpine Division with a mix of reinforcements from Italy, while the artillery groups reinforced other artillery regiments. In March 1941 the division's units returned to Italy.

In preparation for the division's deployment to Libya for the Western Desert campaign the regiment was reinforced in June 1941 with the IX Group with 105/28 cannons, the XXI Mixed Anti-aircraft Group with two batteries equipped with 75/27 C.K. anti-aircraft guns on Lancia 1Z trucks and one battery with 20/65 mod. 35 anti-aircraft guns, and the 301st Anti-tank Battery with 47/32 mod. 35 anti-tank guns. In September 1941 the division disembarked in Libya and was immediately employed in the Siege of Tobruk.

After the British Operation Crusader in November 1941 and German-Italian Panzer Group Africa counterattack in January 1942 towards Ain el Gazala the regiment was reorganized. On 1 April 1941 the regiment consisted of a command, command unit, the I and II groups with 100/17 mod. 16 howitzers, the III and IV groups with 75/27 mod. 06 field guns, the LXII Anti-aircraft Group with 7.5cm PL vz.37 (75/50) anti-aircraft guns, and the 146th and 411th anti-aircraft batteries with 20/65 mod. 35 anti-aircraft guns.

In May 1942 the division took part in the Battle of Gazala and in June in the Axis offensive to capture Tobruk. In July 1942 the division fought in the First Battle of El Alamein and in September in the Battle of Alam el Halfa. On 23 October 1942 the British Eighth Army commenced the Second Battle of El Alamein, during which most of the Trieste division was annihilated. The division's remnants retreated with the rest of the German-Italian Panzer Army to El Agheila.

At the end of November the Trieste division incorporated the survivors of other Italian divisions and the division then fought in the Battle of El Agheila, after which Axis forces retreated into Tunisia, where the Trieste participated in the Tunisian Campaign. In Tunisia the division fought in the Battle of Medenine, the Battle of the Mareth Line, and the Battle of Wadi Akarit, before retreating to the Enfidaville Line. There the division and its regiments surrendered on 13 May 1943 to allied forces.

For its conduct and bravery in Albania and its sacrifice in North Africa the 21st Artillery Regiment "Trieste" was awarded on 18 April 1992 Italy's highest military honor the Gold Medal of Military Valor, which was affixed to the regiment's flag and is depicted on the regiment's coat of arms.

=== Cold War ===
On 1 October 1950 the 21st Field Artillery Regiment was reformed in Bologna and assigned to the Infantry Division "Trieste", which also included the 40th Infantry Regiment "Bologna" and 82nd Infantry Regiment "Torino". By 1 January 1951 the regiment consisted of a command, command unit, and a group with QF 25-pounder field guns. In 1951 the regiment formed a second group with QF 25-pounder field guns and a light anti-aircraft group with 40/56 autocannons. On 15 July 1951 the 6th Armored Cavalry Regiment "Lancieri di Aosta" joined the Infantry Division "Trieste". In 1952 the regiment moved from Bologna to Modena, where on 1 January 1953 it received two groups with M18 Hellcat tank destroyers from the 121st Field Artillery Regiment.

On 15 June 1953 the groups of the 21st Field Artillery Regiment were transferred to the 121st Field Artillery Regiment, which was renamed 21st Field Artillery Regiment. The same day the command and command unit of the now former 21st Field Artillery Regiment moved to Bologna, where they formed the 121st Heavy Anti-aircraft Artillery Regiment. Afterwards the 21st Field Artillery Regiment consisted of the following units:

- 21st Field Artillery Regiment, in Modena
  - Command Unit (from the 121st Field Artillery Regiment)
  - I Group with QF 25-pounder field guns (from the 21st Field Artillery Regiment)
  - II Group with QF 25-pounder field guns (from the 121st Field Artillery Regiment and re-equipped with QF 25-pounder field guns)
  - IV Group with M114 155 mm howitzers (transferred on 30 June 1953 from the 9th Heavy Artillery Regiment)
  - V Light Anti-aircraft Group with 40/56 autocannons (formed by merging the two regiments' light anti-aircraft groups)
  - I Self-propelled Group with M18 Hellcat tank destroyers
  - II Self-propelled Group with M18 Hellcat tank destroyers

On 1 December 1953 the regiment transferred the two self-propelled groups to the 35th Army Corps Self-propelled Artillery Regiment.

In October 1954, the Trieste United States Troops and British Element Trieste Force began to depart from the city of Trieste, which was scheduled to return to Italian control on 26 October 1954. On 15 October, in preparation for the handover, the Italian Army formed the Grouping "Trieste" in Udine. The grouping consisted of units drawn from the Infantry Division "Trieste": part of the division's command, the 82nd Infantry Regiment "Torino" and the I Group of the 21st Field Artillery Regiment. On 23 October the Infantry Division "Trieste" was officially disbanded. The 40th Infantry Regiment "Bologna" and the 21st Artillery Regiment were assigned to the newly formed Grouping "Bologna", while the 6th Armored Cavalry Regiment "Lancieri di Aosta" was transferred to the VI Territorial Military Command.

In June 1955 the regiment moved from Modena to Forlì, while the 8th Heavy Field Artillery Regiment and 35th Army Corps Self-propelled Artillery Regiment moved to Modena. On 15 September of the same year the Grouping "Trieste" was disbanded and its units assigned to the Infantry Division "Folgore", with the 21st Field Artillery Regiment's I Group becoming the III Group of the 33rd Field Artillery Regiment. On the same day the Infantry Division "Trieste" was reformed in Bologna and the 21st Field Artillery Regiment was reorganized. The regiment now consisted of a command, a command unit, a group with QF 25-pounder field guns, a mixed group, which fielded one battery with M114 155mm howitzers and one light anti-aircraft battery with 40/56 autocannons, and an artillery specialists section.

In 1960 the Infantry Division "Trieste" was reduced to Infantry Brigade "Trieste" and consequently on 20 October 1960 the regiment was disbanded in Forlì and the next day the personnel and materiel of the disbanded regiment were used to form the Field Artillery Group "Trieste" in Bologna. The group inherited the traditions of the 21st Artillery Regiment "Trieste", but not the regiment's flag, which was transferred to the Shrine of the Flags in the Vittoriano in Rome. The group consisted of a command, a command and services battery, three batteries with QF 25-pounder field guns, and one light anti-aircraft battery with 40/56 autocannons. In 1961 the group was equipped with 105/14 mod. 56 pack howitzers and in 1966 with 105/22 mod. 14/61 howitzers.

During the 1975 army reform the army disbanded the regimental level and newly independent battalions and groups were granted for the first time their own flags. On 18 September 1975 the Field Artillery Group "Trieste" was renamed 21st Field Artillery Group "Romagna". To avoid confusion with the support units of the Mechanized Brigade "Trieste" the group was named for the Romagna region to the South of Bologna. The group was assigned to the Mechanized Brigade "Trieste" and consisted of a command, a command and services battery, and three batteries with M114 155 mm howitzers.

On 12 November 1976 the President of the Italian Republic Giovanni Leone assigned with decree 846 the flag and traditions of the 21st Artillery Regiment "Trieste" to the group. At the time the group fielded 485 men (37 officers, 58 non-commissioned officers, and 390 soldiers).

=== Recent times ===
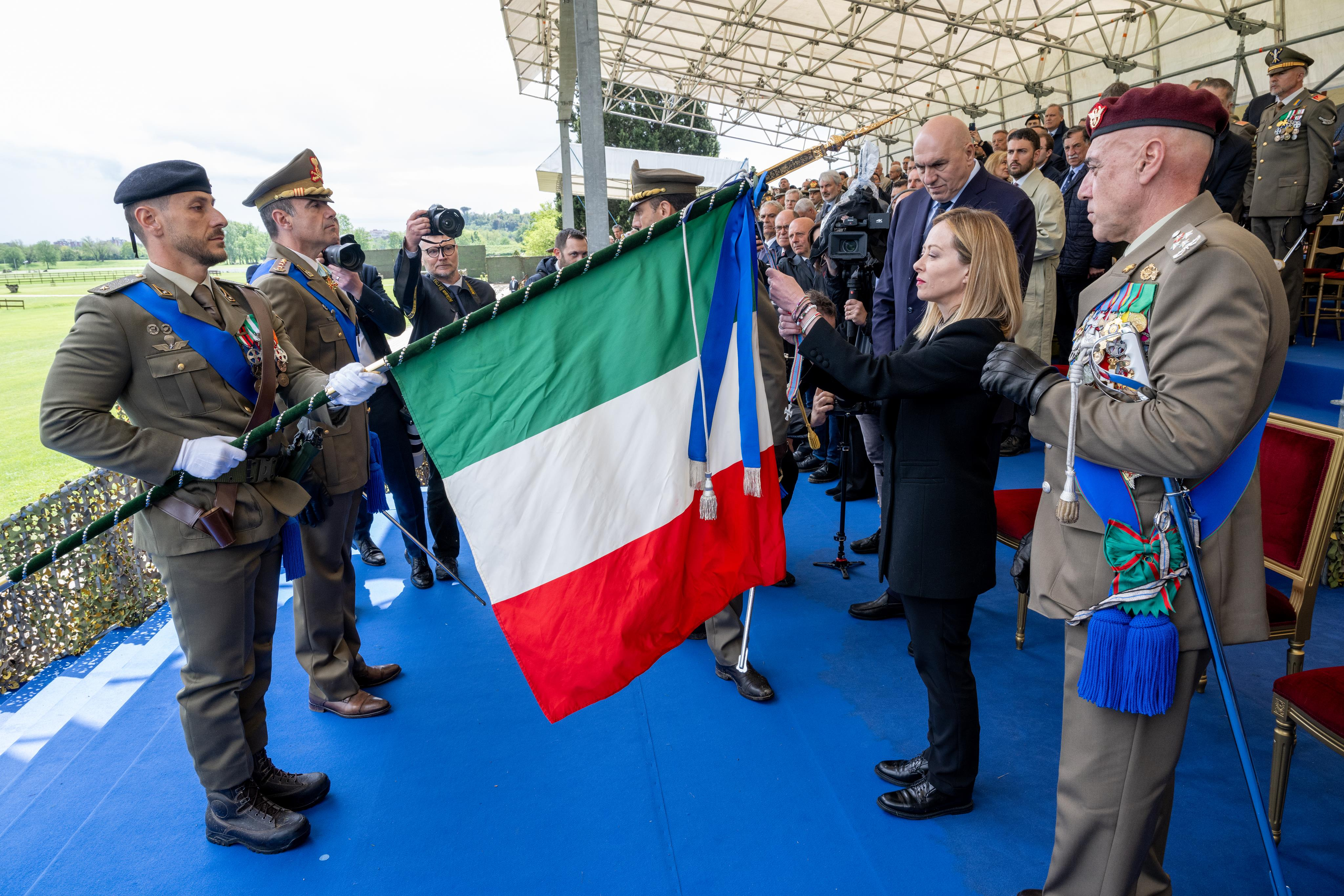
Italian Prime Minister Giorgia Meloni decorates the flag of the regiment with a Silver Cross of Army Merit

In 1991, after the end of the Cold War, the Italian Army disbanded many of its artillery units in the country's Northeast and transferred their equipment to the remaining artillery units, including the 21st Field Artillery Group "Romagna", which was equipped with M109G 155 mm self-propelled howitzers and was renamed 21st Self-propelled Field Artillery Group "Romagna". On 31 May of the same year the Mechanized Brigade "Trieste" was merged into the Motorized Brigade "Friuli", which was redesignated Mechanized Brigade "Friuli". On 1 December 1992 the group formed a Self-defense Anti-aircraft Battery, which was equipped with SIDAM self-propelled anti-aircraft guns. On 28 September 1993 the group lost its autonomy and the next day entered the 21st Self-propelled Field Artillery Regiment "Trieste". The same year the regiment replaced its M109G 155 mm self-propelled howitzers with more powerful M109L 155 mm self-propelled howitzers.

In March 2001 the batteries of the 21st Self-propelled Field Artillery Regiment "Trieste" in Bologna were disbanded and the regiment's flag was transferred to Foggia, where it supplanted the flag of the 131st Self-propelled Field Artillery Regiment "Centauro". Afterwards the flag of the Centauro was transferred to the Shrine of the Flags in the Vittoriano in Rome, while the 21st Field Artillery Regiment "Trieste" became the artillery unit of the Mechanized Brigade "Pinerolo". In 2016 the regiment replaced its M109L with FH-70 155 mm howitzers.

== Organization ==
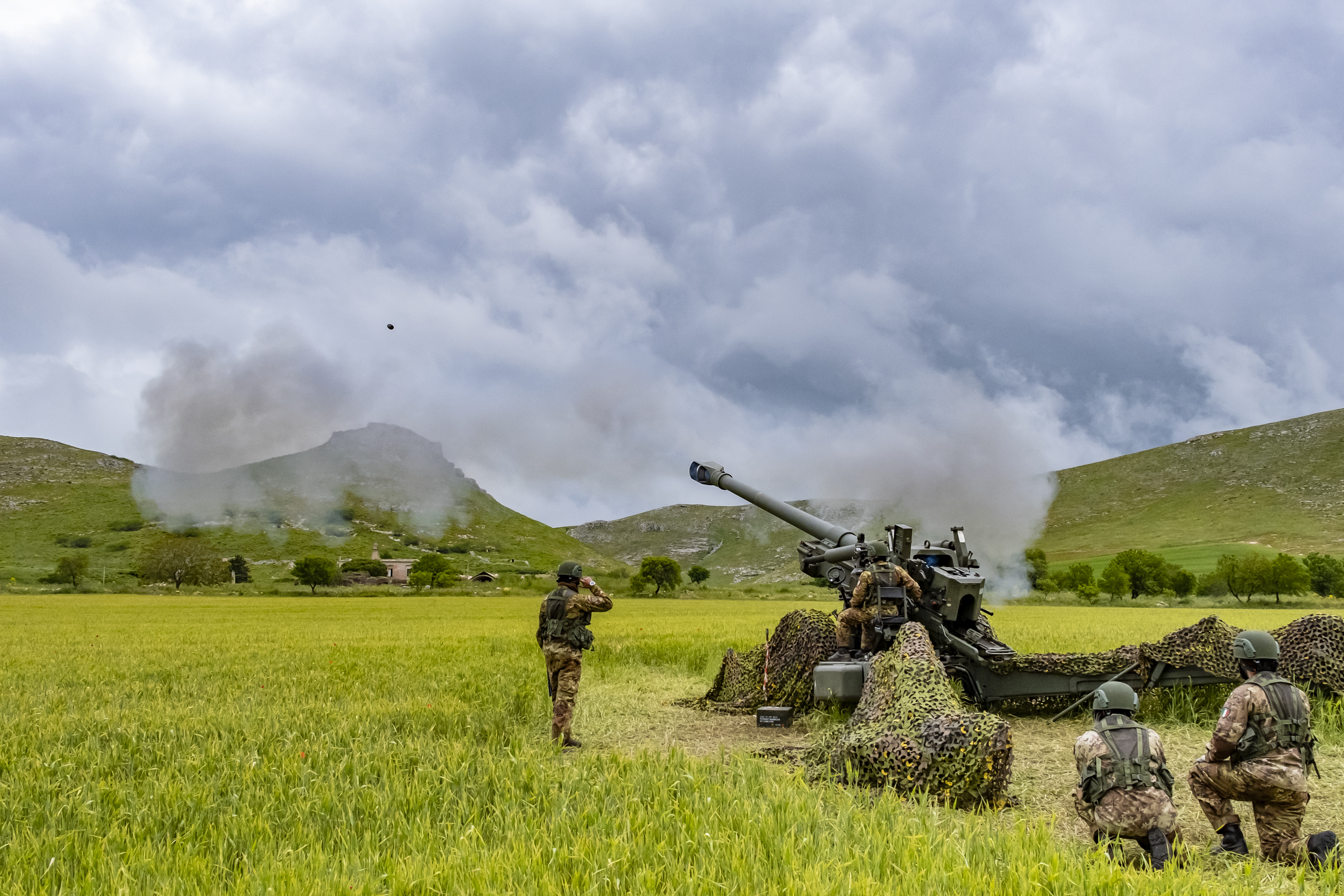
21st Field Artillery Regiment "Trieste" FH-70 howitzer during an exercise

As of 2026 the 21st Field Artillery Regiment "Trieste" is organized as follows:

- 21st Field Artillery Regiment "Trieste", in Foggia
  - Command and Logistic Support Battery
  - Surveillance, Target Acquisition and Tactical Liaison Battery
  - 1st Artillery Group
    - 1st Howitzer Battery
    - 2nd Howitzer Battery
    - 3rd Howitzer Battery
    - Fire and Technical Support Battery

The regiment is equipped with FH-70 towed howitzers.

== See also ==
- Mechanized Brigade "Pinerolo"
