= 104th Infantry Division "Mantova" =

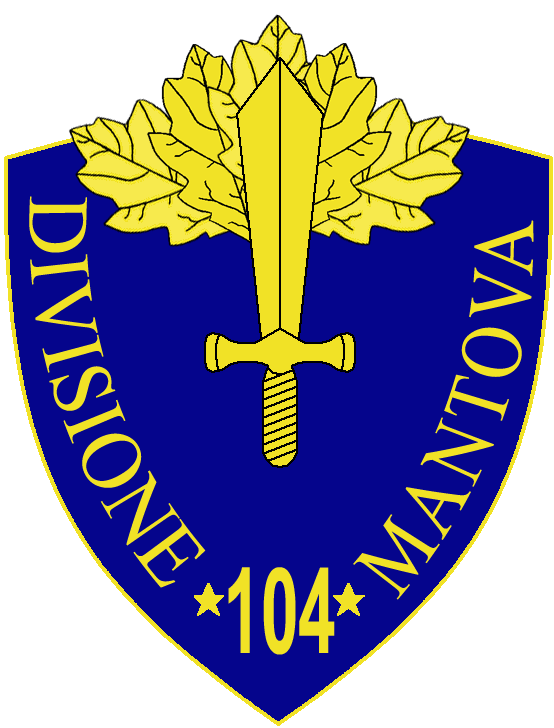
- 104th Infantry Division "Mantova" insignia
- Active: 15 March 1942 – 21 October 1975; 1 January 2003 – 15 July 2013
- Country: Kingdom of Italy; Italian Republic
- Branch: Royal Italian Army; Italian Army
- Type: Infantry
- Role: Infantry
- Size: Division
- Engagements: Second World War

Insignia
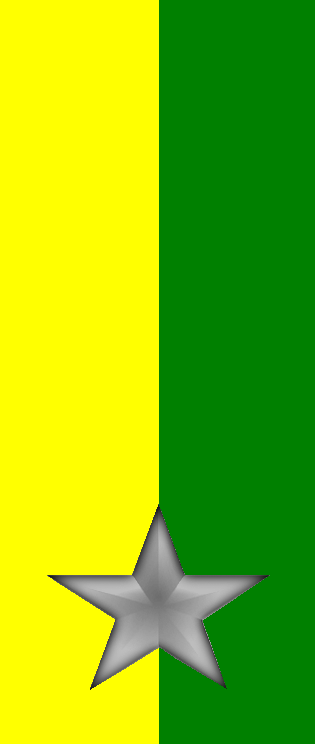
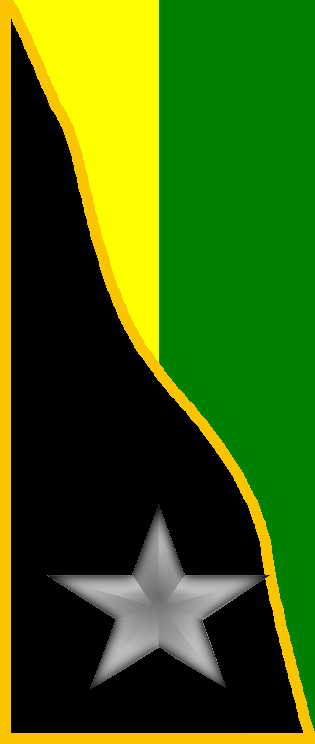
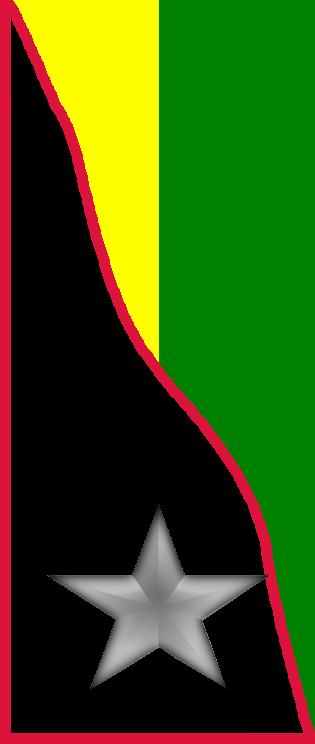
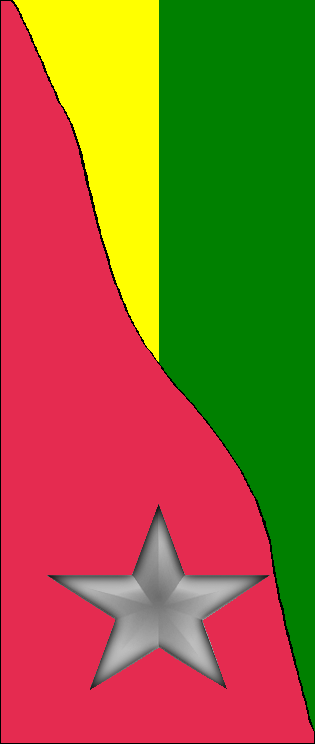
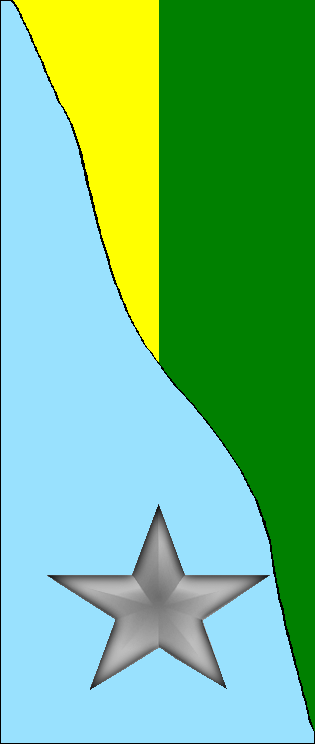
- Identification symbol: Mantova Division gorget patches

The 104th Infantry Division "Mantova" (Italian: 104ª Divisione di fanteria "Mantova") was an infantry division of the Royal Italian Army during the Second World War. The Mantova was named for the city of Mantua (Italian: Mantova) and classified as an auto-transportable division, meaning it had some motorized transport, but not enough to move the entire division at once.

== History ==
=== World War I ===
The division's lineage begins with the Brigade "Mantova" raised on 1 March 1915 with the 113th and 114th infantry regiments. The brigade fought on the Italian front in World War I and was disbanded after the war in November 1919.

=== World War II ===
The 104th Infantry Division "Mantova" was activated in Verona on 15 March 1942 and consisted of the 113th Infantry Regiment "Mantova", 114th Infantry Regiment "Mantova", and the 121st Motorized Artillery Regiment. As a division raised during the war the Mantova did not have its own regimental depots and therefore its regiments were raised by the depots of the auto-transportable 9th Infantry Division "Pasubio": the 113th Infantry Regiment "Mantova" was raised in Verona on 1 January 1942 by the 79th Infantry Regiment "Pasubio" and the 114th Infantry Regiment "Mantova" was raised in Mantua on 10 December 1941 by the 80th Infantry Regiment "Pasubio", The 121st Motorized Artillery Regiment was raised in Piacenza by the depot of the 21st Artillery Regiment "Trieste".

In June 1942 the division exchanged artillery regiments with the 3rd Infantry Division "Ravenna", which needed a fully motorized and modern equipped artillery regiment for its deployment to the Soviet Union: the Mantova ceded the 121st Motorized Artillery Regiment equipped with modern 75/18 mod. 34 howitzers to the Ravenna and received the 11th Artillery Regiment "Ravenna" equipped with World War I vintage 75/27 mod. 06 field guns in return.

In May 1942 the division moved to Saluzzo in Piedmont and joined the XXII Army Corps. In October of the same year the Mantvoa was transferred to the I Army Corps and changed its garrison to Turin and Asti. In January 1943 the division was transferred to Nicastro in Calabria and joined the XXXI Army Corps as the corps' mobile reserve in the area between Catanzaro and Sant'Eufemia d'Aspromonte.

After allied forces had landed on the Italian peninsula and the Armistice of Cassibile between Italy and the Allies had been announced on 8 September 1943 the division remained loyal to King Victor Emmanuel III and joined the Italian Co-belligerent Army. On 26 September 1943 the division gave up part of the 11th Artillery Regiment to help form the Italian 1st Motorized Group under command of the 58th Infantry Division "Legnano", which was to aid in the allied war effort. On 16 October 1943 its 113th Infantry Regiment joined the US Fifth Army, and on 30 October 1943 the division received the 76th Infantry Regiment "Napoli" as replacement for the 113th.

In spring 1944 the division took command of the remnants of the 155th Infantry Division "Emilia", after they had been repatriated from combat against German forces in Dalmatia. At that point the division consisted of the following understrength units:

- 76th Infantry Regiment "Napoli"
- 114th Infantry Regiment "Mantova"
- 119th Infantry Regiment "Emilia"
- 120th Infantry Regiment "Emilia"
- 155th Artillery Regiment "Emilia"
- I Group/11th Artillery Regiment "Mantova"

At the beginning of fall 1944 the division was ordered to re-organize as Combat Group "Mantova" destined for the frontlines in central Italy. The 76th and 114th infantry regiments and 155th Artillery Regiment were brought up to strength and equipped with British materiel. By spring 1945 the combat group was ready to join the British Eighth Army, but it arrived at the front just as the German forces in Italy were surrendering.

On 15 October 1945 the Combat Group "Mantova" regained its old name of Infantry Division "Mantova", which continued to exist until 1986 when it was reduced to Mechanized Brigade "Mantova".

=== Recent times ===
In 2002 the Italian Army raised three division commands, with one of the three always readily deployable for NATO missions. The army decided that each division should carry on the traditions of one of the divisions that served with distinction in World War II. Therefore, on 31 December 2002 the 2nd Italian Division in Vittorio Veneto was renamed as Division Command "Mantova".

During the 2013 Army reform it was decided to rename the Division "Mantova" as Division "Friuli".

== Organization ==
=== 104th Infantry Division "Mantova" ===
104th Motorized Division "Mantova" organization in 1943

- 104th Infantry Division "Mantova"
  - Headquarters
    - Command Company
    - 150th Carabinieri Section
    - 151st Carabinieri Section
    - 104th Field Post Office
    - 104th Infantry Division Command Transport Squad
  - 113th Infantry Regiment "Mantova"
    - Command Company
    - 3 × Fusilier battalions
    - Support Weapons Battery (65/17 mod. 13 infantry support guns)
    - Mortar Company (81mm mod. 35 mortars)
  - 114th Infantry Regiment "Mantova"
    - Command Company
    - 3 × Fusilier battalions
    - Cannons Company (47/32 mod. 35 anti-tank guns)
    - Mortar Company (81mm mod. 35 mortars)
  - 11th Artillery Regiment "Mantova", in Alessandria (transferred from the 3rd Infantry Division "Ravenna" in June 1942)
    - Command Unit
    - I Group (100/17 mod. 14 howitzers; re-equipped with 100/22 mod. 14/19 howitzers in early 1943)
    - II Group (100/22 mod. 14/19 howitzers; transferred in April 1943 from the 37th Artillery Regiment "Piacenza")
    - II Group (75/13 mod. 15 mountain guns; re-equipped with 75/18 mod. 35 howitzers in early 1943 and renumbered IV Group)
    - III Group (75/13 mod. 15 mountain guns; transferred in September 1940 to the 49th Artillery Regiment "Parma" in exchange for a group with 75/27 mod. 06 field guns; re-equipped with 75/18 mod. 35 howitzers in early 1943)
    - 363rd Anti-aircraft Battery (20/65 mod. 35 anti-aircraft guns)
    - Ammunition and Supply Unit
  - 121st Motorized Artillery Regiment (transferred to the 3rd Infantry Division "Ravenna" in June 1942)
    - Command Unit
    - I Group (75/18 mod. 35 howitzers)
    - II Group (75/18 mod. 35 howitzers)
    - III Group (75/18 mod. 35 howitzers)
    - 1 × Anti-aircraft battery (20/65 mod. 35 anti-aircraft guns)
    - Ammunition and Supply Unit
  - CIV Mortar Battalion (81mm mod. 35 mortars; joined the division in October 1942)
  - 304th Anti-tank Company (47/32 mod. 35 anti-tank guns)
  - 79th Engineer Company
  - 107th Telegraph and Radio Operators Company
  - 104th Medical Section
    - 2 × Field hospitals (a third hospital was added in early 1943)
    - 1 × Surgical unit
  - 102nd Supply Section
  - 1146th Transport Section

=== Combat Group "Mantova" ===
Combat Group "Mantova" organization

- Combat Group "Mantova"
  - Command Company
  - British Eighth Army Liaison Squad
  - 76th Infantry Regiment "Napoli"
    - Command Company
    - 3 × Fusilier battalions
    - Anti-tank Company (QF 6-pounder anti-tank guns)
    - Mortar Company (ML 3-inch mortars)
  - 114th Infantry Regiment "Mantova"
    - Command Company
    - 3 × Fusilier battalions
    - Anti-tank Company (QF 6-pounder anti-tank guns)
    - Mortar Company (ML 3-inch mortars)
  - 155th Artillery Regiment "Emilia"
    - Command Unit
    - I Group (QF 25-pounder field guns)
    - II Group (QF 25-pounder field guns)
    - III Group (QF 25-pounder field guns)
    - IV Group (QF 25-pounder field guns)
    - V Anti-tank Group (QF 17-pounder anti-tank guns)
    - VI Anti-aircraft Group (QF 40mm anti-aircraft guns)
  - CIV Mixed Engineer Battalion
    - 4th Engineer Company (joined 1 January 1945)
    - 79th Engineer Company
    - 107th Teleradio Company
  - Transport and Supply Company
  - Mobile Artillery and Engineer Materiel Depot
  - Medical Section
    - 2 × Field hospitals
    - 1 × Surgical unit
  - Maintenance Workshop

== Commanding officers ==
The division's commanding officers were:

- Generale di Brigata Marcello Piccone (15 March 1942 - 9 February 1943)
- Generale di Brigata Guido Bologna (10 February 1943 - 1945)
