= Giulio Cesare Gotti Porcinari =

Italian general

- Born: 17 August 1888; Florence, Kingdom of Italy
- Died: 7 September 1946 (aged 58); Rome, Italy
- Military career
- Allegiance: Kingdom of Italy
- Branch: Royal Italian Army
- Rank: Major General
- Commands: 1st Bersaglieri Regiment; Central Military School; 54th Infantry Division Napoli
- Conflicts: Italo-Turkish War; World War I; Battles of the Isonzo; World War II; Allied invasion of Sicily
- Awards: Bronze Medal of Military Valour (twice); War Cross of Military Valor; Order of the Crown of Italy; Order of Saints Maurice and Lazarus; Czechoslovak War Cross 1918

Count Giulio Cesare Gotti Porcinari (Florence, 17 August 1888 – Rome, 7 luglio 1946) was an Italian general during World War II.

== Biography ==
Hailing from an old aristocratic family, he held both the titles of Count and Patrician of Volterra, which he had inherited in 1939 at the death of his childless older brother Mario Morando Gotti Porcinari. He was also a Knight of the Military Order of Malta and a personal friend of Crown Prince Umberto. In 1914 he married Margherita Pasca dei Baroni di Magliano, with whom he had four children (Elisabetta, born in 1914; Maria Rosaria and Adele, twins, born in 1921; Alberto, born in 1926). He fought as a second lieutenant in the Bersaglieri during the Italo-Turkish War, earning a Bronze Medal of Military Valor for his behaviour during the fighting in Libya in October–November 1911, and later as a captain, major and lieutenant colonel in the First World War, earning another bronze medal on the Isonzo front in September 1915 and a War Cross for Military Valor in the Valsugana in May 1916.

In 1918-1919 he also fought with the Czechoslovak Legion, both in Italy and Slovakia; for this, he was also decorated by the Czechoslovak government. From 1934 to 1937, with the rank of colonel, he commanded the 1st Bersaglieri Regiment. In August 1939 he was promoted to brigadier general, being then attached to the Army Corps of Rome until November 1939, when he became deputy commander of the 16th Infantry Division Pistoia.

On 15 June 1940, five days after Italy's entry into World War II, he was given command of the Central Military School. In February 1942 he was appointed commander of the 54th Infantry Division Napoli, stationed in southern Sicily (with headquarters in Caltanissetta and later in Vizzini), being promoted to major general five months later. The Napoli Division, stationed between Caltagirone, Mirabella and Piazza Armerina, was tasked with intervening in support of the coastal units in the case of an enemy landing on the coast between Catania, Augusta and Syracuse, and secondarily in support of the garrisons of Gela, Ispica and Pachino. In a report later written about the state of his troops in the summer of 1943, Gotti Porcinari stated:

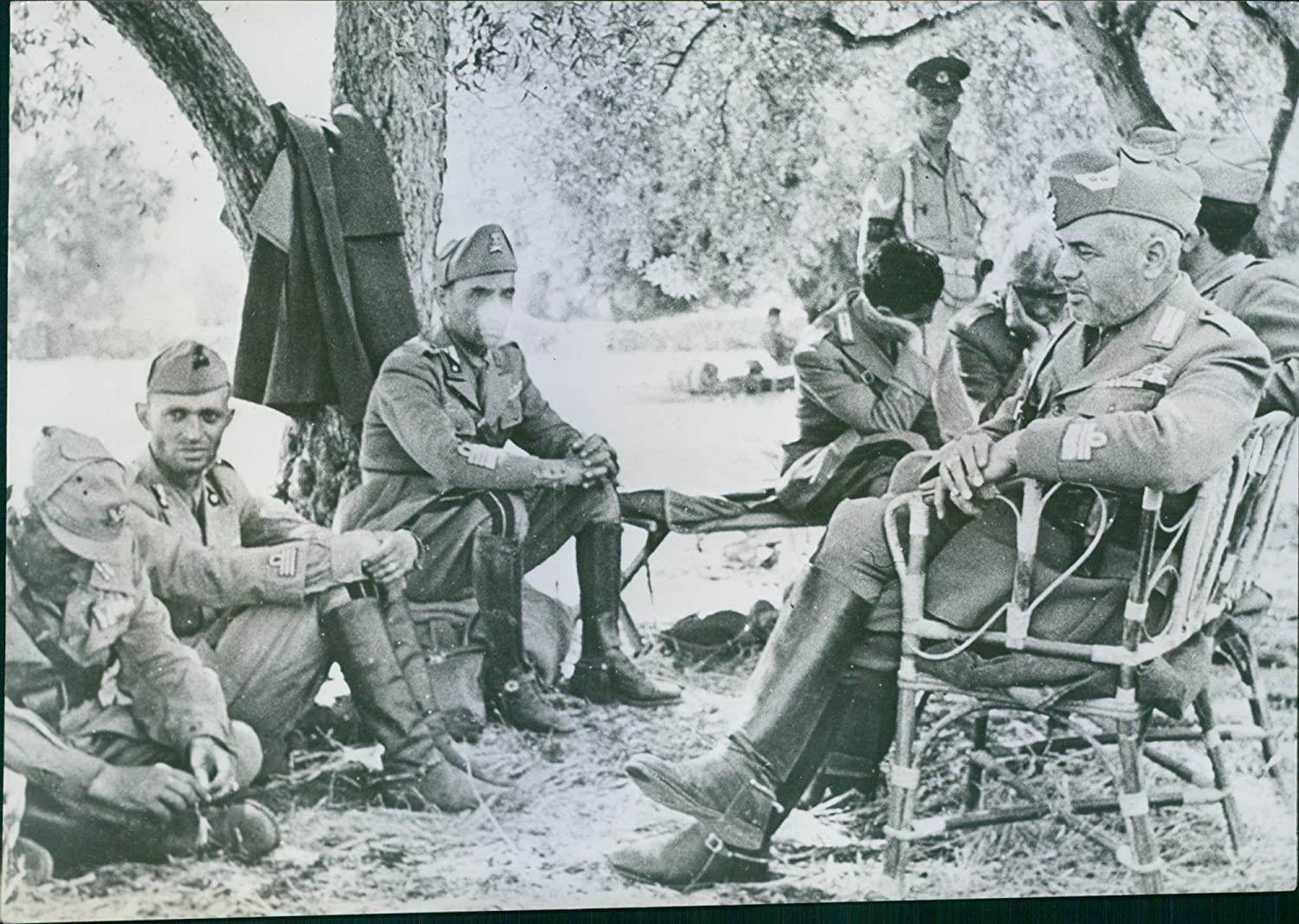
General Gotti Porcinari (right) and his staff after being captured

Everyone was firm in their purpose to keep the enemy away from the island. Three-fifths of the soldiers in the division had been recruited in districts of Sicily; therefore, they weren’t free of deep concern about their families, given the (constantly growing, in the last period) violence and extension of the bombing and strafing attacks on towns and countryside by enemy aircraft. In October 1942, the division was asked to provide officers and soldiers (volunteers) that would be sent to Russia, replacing troops that in turn would be repatriated from Russia and would replace said volunteers (3,500 men). Thus the units lost one third of their strength, the best educated, most enthusiastic and most willing men, and the division was placed in a terrible state of crisis, as in one stroke the thorough training (specialist troops, non-commissioned officers, officers, shock troops) of men and units, that had been carried out in multiple areas, was nullified. At the end of May 1943 General Testi, the commander of the division's infantry, previously Chief of Staff of the XVI Corps, was transferred to mainland Italy; Colonel De Fonzo, commander of the 54th Artillery Regiment, was appointed Chief of Staff of the Intendance of Sicily; on 15 June Colonel Mazzarella, commander of the 75th Infantry Regiment, a role which he had held firmly, was removed from his position and transferred to the 213th Coastal Division. We thus lost capable senior officers, who knew well the regions and the units under their command. The troops that had come from Russia were not content with their transfer to Sicily (…) The regiments had between 1/3 and ¼ of their troops that, due to superior orders, were not given any leave, not even in case of death of their parents. When some of these men were granted leave by the divisional command in derogation from these orders, they were sent back to the division under the escort of Carabinieri, and the divisional command was reprimanded by the Ministry for this. Most of them were excellent soldiers who, in great numbers, asked their colonels and the commander of the division the reason for this undeserved mistrust and their different treatment from that of the islanders, who instead enjoyed leaves. With the specious pretext of lack of transport, at the end of 1942 all leaves for mainland Italy were suspended, while troop trains were used exclusively for German troops. (…) Another loss, in addition to that of the commanding officers, was the transfer to the coastal units of all soldiers born in 1910-1911-1912-1913-1914, who were replaced with hastily-trained recruits born in 1923. Still in June 1943, the Division was deprived of 12 officers and 100 enlisted men, chosen among the best, in order to create a unit for a special Arditi battalion elsewhere.

After the Allied landings in Sicily on 10 July 1943, the Division engaged the advancing Allied troops in Noto, Lentini, Brucoli, Floridia, Solarino and Palazzolo Acreide, suffering heavy losses; Gotti Porcinari also ordered a counterattack with the few Renault R35 tanks at his disposal, but this was soon stopped by minefields and the vastly superior Sherman tanks. On 13 July 1943, Gotti Porcinari was surrounded and captured by British troops of the Durham Light Infantry along with his entire staff, near the hamlet of Case Rosse, not far from Solarino. After his capture he was brought before General Bernard Law Montgomery, who demanded that he provide information about the deployment of Italian troops, which he refused, resulting in an altercation between the two. A Time war correspondent wrote that British soldiers joked about having "taken Julius Caesar". He was then taken to Egypt and held there as a prisoner of war for three years, being only released from captivity in April 1946. He died a few months after his repatriation, at age 58.
