= 54th Infantry Division "Napoli" =

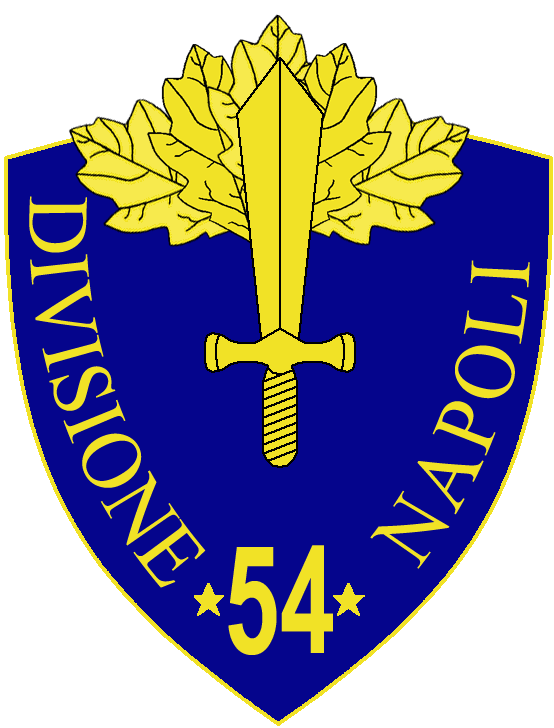
- 54th Infantry Division "Napoli" insignia
- Active: 1939–1943
- Country: Kingdom of Italy
- Branch: Royal Italian Army
- Type: Infantry
- Size: Division
- Garrison/HQ: Caltanissetta
- Engagements: World War II

Commanders
- Notable commanders: Generale di Divisione Giulio Cesare Gotti Porcinari

Insignia
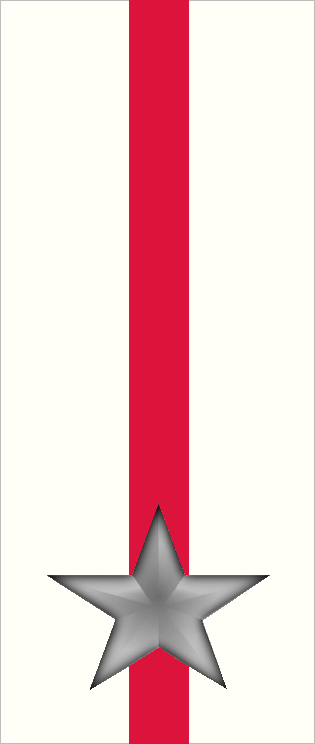
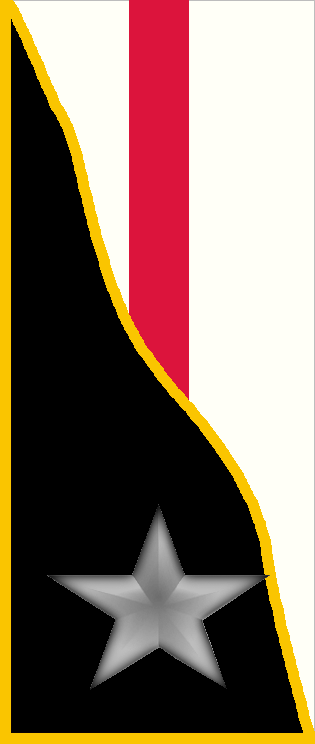
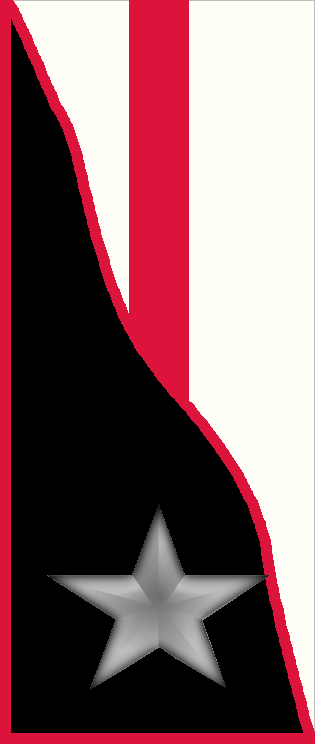
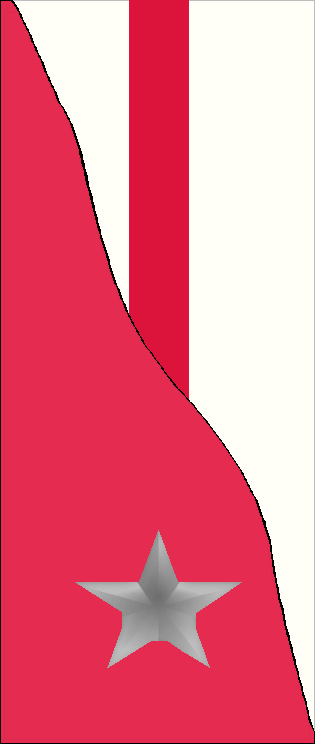
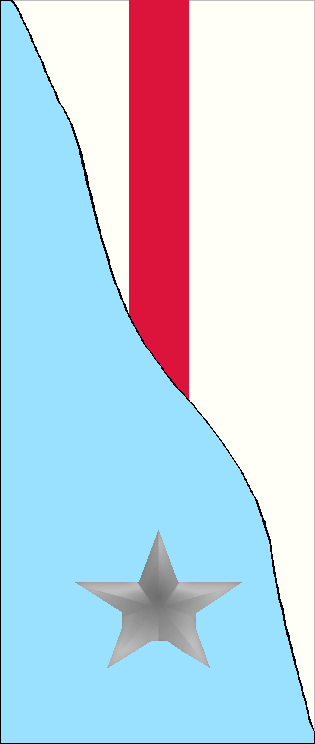
- Identification symbol: Napoli Division gorget patches

Map of Sicily showing Napoli's location during the initial allied landings

The 54th Infantry Division "Napoli" (Italian: 54ª Divisione di fanteria "Napoli") was an infantry division of the Royal Italian Army during World War II. The Napoli was formed on 15 April 1939 in Caltanissetta and named for the city of Naples. The division dissolved on 14 August 1943 in Melia southeast of Scilla in Calabria after being heavily decimated during the Allied invasion of Sicily. The division drafted men in southern Sicily and members of the division hailed from Caltanissetta, Agrigento, Syracuse and the surrounding territories.

The 54th Infantry Division "Napoli" was one of three divisions, which recruited in Sicily. It mainly drafted men from southern Sicily and had its peacetime headquarters in Caltanissetta. It's two infantry regiments were based in Syracuse (75th) and Agrigento (76th), while the division's artillery regiment was based in Caltanissetta. The 173rd CC.NN. Legion and CLXXIII CC.NN. Battalion were recruited in Caltanissetta and the CLXIX CC.NN. Battalion in Syracuse.

== History ==
The division's lineage begins with the Brigade "Granatieri di Napoli" established on 15 April 1861 with the 5th and 6th grenadier regiments. On 5 March 1871 the brigade was assigned to the infantry and renamed Brigade "Napoli". On the same date brigade's two regiments were renamed 75th Infantry Regiment and 76th Infantry Regiment.

=== World War I ===
During World War I the brigade fought initially on the Italian front, but in April 1918 it was transferred together with the Brigade "Alpi", Brigade "Brescia", and Brigade "Salerno" to the Western Front in France. There the brigades fought in the Third Battle of the Aisne, Second Battle of the Marne, Battle of Saint-Thierry, and the Hundred Days Offensive.

On 18 November 1926 the brigade and the 76th Infantry Regiment "Napoli" were disbanded, while the 75th Infantry Regiment "Napoli" was assigned to the XXIX Infantry Brigade. On 15 April 1939 the 54th Infantry Division "Napoli" was activated in Caltanissetta, which received the 75th Infantry Regiment "Napoli" from the 29th Infantry Division "Piemonte" and the 76th Infantry Regiment "Napoli" from the 28th Infantry Division "Aosta". On the same date the division received the reactivated the 54th Artillery Regiment, which was given the name "Napoli".

=== World War II ===
In 1940, the Napoli division was deployed in southern Sicily, with garrisons in Caltagirone, Piazza Armerina and Mirabella Imbaccari. In 1941 it was re-deployed focusing on coastal defence in the area of Pozzallo-Gela-Licata. In the anticipation of the Allied invasion of Sicily the XVI Army Corps decided to split the division into two groups: one group placed at Ramacca and Scordia, with the other group in Palazzolo Acreide. Before the allied landings occurred, the division's headquarters at Palazzolo Acreide was bombed by allied air forces on the night of 8 July 1943.

On the day of the Allied landings on 10 July 1943, the Napoli engaged in fighting south of Noto, while its northern group fought at Lentini and Brucoli. When British forces attacked Floridia from the Ponte Diddino road, the Italian forces soon started to fail, despite heavy fighting on the mountaintop positions north of Solarino. On the second day of the campaign, on 12 July 1943, the British captured Floridia and the entirety of the 75th Infantry Regiment as it was attempting to withdraw from the town. Meanwhile, the division's southern group had made contact with an advancing battalion of the Durham Light Infantry on 12 July on the road between Palazzolo Acreide and Floridia. Its attacks, using infantry and five tanks, were repelled by British artillery and anti-tank fire. By 12 July 1943, the division had managed to stabilize the front-line at Palazzolo Acreide-Solarino-Priolo Gargallo. By 13 July 1943, the new Allied landing north of Augusta outflanked the division, and inflicted heavy casualties. Destruction continued on 14 July 1943, as remnants of division fought a rear-guard battle at Scordia to protect other units retreating from Caltagirone and Vizzini. It has been estimated that the division lost up to eighty-percent of its effectiveness soon after its initial contact with British forces. The remnants of the Napoli Division were absorbed into the incoming Panzer Division "Hermann Göring", with which they fought some small rearguard battles on 16–24 July 1943. On 25 July 1943, the Napoli division tried to reform at Linguaglossa, but it became apparent that its cut-off subunits had either been destroyed or captured by the Allies, so the attempt to reform was abandoned and the remaining personnel were ordered to Messina, from where it was evacuated to Southern Italy on 11–14 August 1943. The division was dissolved immediately after the evacuation had ended on 14 August 1943.

== Organization ==
54th Infantry Division "Napoli" organization in 1940

- 54th Infantry Division "Napoli", in Caltanissetta
  - Headquarters
    - Command Company
    - 2 × Carabinieri sections
    - 74th Field Post Office
    - 54th Infantry Division Command Transport Squad
  - 75th Infantry Regiment "Napoli", Syracuse
    - Command Company
    - 3 × Fusilier battalions
    - Support Weapons Battery (65/17 mod. 13 infantry support guns)
    - Mortar Company (81mm mod. 35 mortars)
  - 76th Infantry Regiment "Napoli", in Agrigento
    - Command Company
    - 3 × Fusilier battalions
    - Support Weapons Battery (65/17 mod. 13 infantry support guns)
    - Mortar Company (81mm mod. 35 mortars)
  - 54th Artillery Regiment "Napoli", in Caltanissetta (formed by the depot of the 22nd Artillery Regiment "Aosta")
    - Command Unit
    - I Group (100/17 mod. 14 howitzers)
    - II Group (75/27 mod. 11 field guns; transferred from the 22nd Artillery Regiment "Aosta")
    - III Group (75/27 mod. 11 field guns; transferred from the 24th Artillery Regiment "Piemonte"; group re-equipped in 1941 with 75/18 mod. 35 howitzers)
    - IV Group (75/18 mod. 35 howitzers; formed by the depot of the 3rd Fast Artillery Regiment "Principe Amedeo Duca d'Aosta" in September 1941)
    - 354th Anti-aircraft Battery (20/65 mod. 35 anti-aircraft guns)
    - Ammunition and Supply Unit
  - LIV Mortar Battalion (81mm mod. 35 mortars)
  - LIV Mixed Engineer Battalion (formed in 1942)
  - 54th Anti-tank Company (47/32 mod. 35 anti-tank guns)
  - 71st Engineer Company (entered the LIV Mixed Engineer Battalion in 1942)
  - 54th Telegraph and Radio Operators Company (entered the LIV Mixed Engineer Battalion in 1942)
  - 53rd Supply Section
  - 54th Transport Section
  - 749th Transport Section
  - Medical Section
    - 207th Field Hospital
    - 851st Field Hospital
    - 1 × Field hospital
    - 1 × Surgical unit

Attached to the division from 1941:

- 173rd CC.NN. Legion "Salso", in Caltanissetta
  - CLXIX CC.NN. Battalion
  - CLXXIII CC.NN. Battalion
  - 174th CC.NN. Machine Gun Company

== Commanding officers ==
The division's commanding officers were:

- Generale di Divisione Renato Coturri (10 May 1939 - 1 January 1942)
- Colonel Riccardo Pepe (acting, 2-8 January 1942)
- Colonel Francesco Mazzarella (acting, 9-31 January 1942)
- Generale di Divisione Giulio Cesare Gotti Porcinari (1 February 1942 - 14 August 1943)

== Bibliography ==
- Paoletti, Ciro (2008). A Military History of Italy. Greenwood Publishing Group. ISBN 978-0-275-98505-9.
- Cloutier, Patrick (2013). Regio Esercito: The Italian Royal Army in Mussolini's Wars, 1935-1943. lulu.com. ISBN 978-1105074011.
- Jowett, Phillip (25 May 2001). The Italian Army 1040-45 (3): Italy 1943-45. Osprey Publishing, Westminster. ISBN 978-1-85532-866-2.
- Mitcham Jr., Samuel and Friedrich von Stauffenburg (2007). The Battle of Sicily: How the Allies Lost their Chance for Total Victory. Stackpole Books, Mechanicsburg, PA. ISBN 9780811734035.
- Rissik, David (2004) [1952]. The D.L.I. at War. The History of the Durham Light Infantry 1939-1945. Naval and Military Press. ISBN 9781845741440.
