= 120th Infantry Regiment "Emilia" =

Inactive Italian Army infantry unit

- 120° Reggimento Fanteria "Emilia"
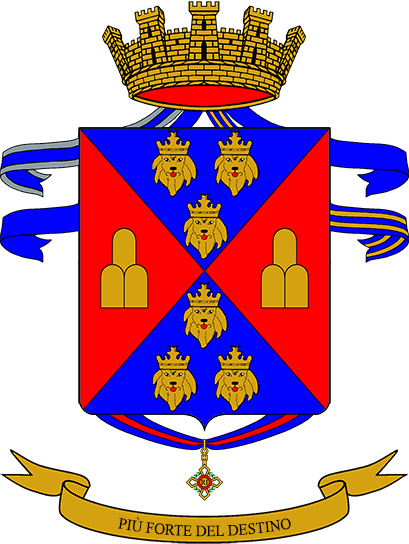
- Regimental coat of arms
- Active: March 1915 – Dec. 1919; 15 Oct. 1941 – 30 June 1945; 1 Oct. 1976 – 30 Nov. 1991
- Country: Italy
- Branch: Italian Army
- Garrison/HQ: Ipplis
- Motto: "Più forte del destino"
- Anniversaries: 15 June 1918 – Battle of Porte di Salton
- Decorations: 1× Military Order of Italy; 1× Silver Medal of Military Valor; 2× Bronze Medals of Military Valor; 1× Bronze Medal of Army Valor

Insignia
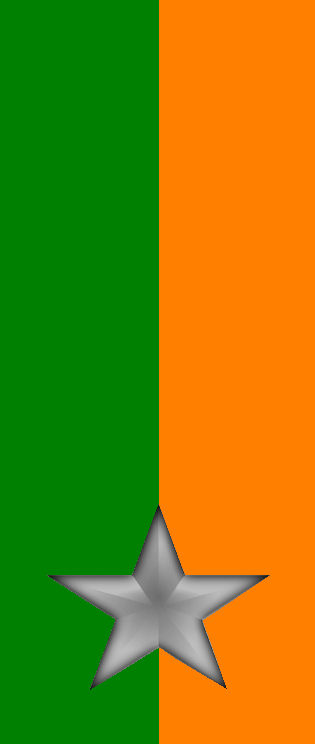
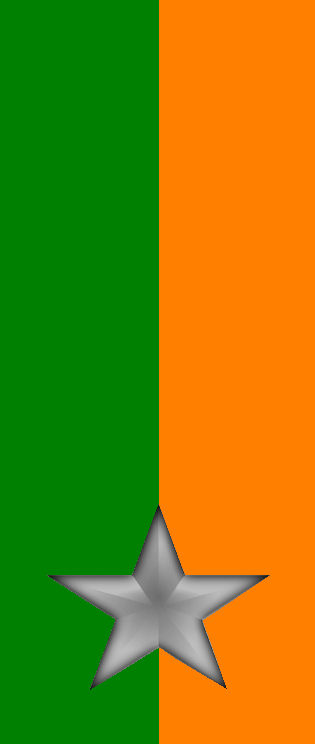
- Regimental gorget patches

The 120th Infantry Regiment "Emilia" (Italian: 120° Reggimento Fanteria "Emilia") is an inactive unit of the Italian Army last based in Ipplis. The regiment is named for the region of Emilia and part of the Italian Army's infantry arm.

The regiment was formed in preparation for Italy's entry into World War I. During the war the regiment fought on the Italian front and was disbanded once the war concluded. The regiment was reformed during World War II and assigned to the 155th Infantry Division "Emilia", which was deployed to as occupation force to Montenegro. After the announcement of the Armistice of Cassibile on 8 September 1943 the division went on the offensive against German forces. On 16 September the division requisitioned every vessel in Kotor harbor and sailed for Apulia in southern Italy, where the regiment was reformed with battalions of divisions that had been destroyed during the German invasion of Italy. The regiment joined the Italian Co-belligerent Army, but did not see combat in the Italian campaign and was disbanded after the war's end. In 1976 the regiment was reformed as a battalion sized unit, which remained active until 1991.

== History ==
=== Formation ===
In March 1915 the 120th Infantry Regiment (Brigade "Emilia") was formed in Ravenna by the regimental depot of the 28th Infantry Regiment (Brigade "Pavia"). At the same time the command of the Brigade "Emilia" and the 119th Infantry Regiment (Brigade "Emilia") were formed in Bologna by the regimental depot of the 35th Infantry Regiment (Brigade "Pistoia"). Both regiments consisted of three battalions, which each fielded four fusilier companies and one machine gun section. The Brigade "Emilia" formed, together with the Brigade "Liguria", the 33rd Division.

=== World War I ===
During World War I the Brigade "Emilia" fought on the Italian front: in June 1915 the brigade fought in the First Battle of the Isonzo near Plave and dislodged Austro-Hungarian forces at Globna, for which the 120th Infantry Regiment was awarded a Bronze Medal of Military Valor. In October of the same year the brigade fought on the slopes of Batognica and in November the brigade was deployed Krn mountain. In 1916 the brigade fought on the Monte Sleme and Monte Mrzli mountains and in 1917 at Grčna near Gorizia. In June 1918 the brigade was deployed to Monte Grappa, where on 15 June it was ferociously attacked by Austro-Hungarian forces on the first day of the Second Battle of the Piave River. The brigade held its positions at Porte di Salton at the cost of 31 officers and 854 enlisted killed or wounded. For its defense at Porte di Salton the brigade's two regiments were awarded a Silver Medal of Military Valor. After the war the brigade and its two regiments were disbanded in December 1919.

=== World War II ===
After Italy's entry into World War II the two regiments of the Brigade "Emilia" were reformed by the regimental depots of the 18th Infantry Division "Messina": the 119th Infantry Regiment "Emilia" was reformed on 15 October 1941 in Ancona by the depot of 93rd Infantry Regiment "Messina", while the 120th Infantry Regiment "Emilia" was reformed on the same day in Fano by the depot of the 94th Infantry Regiment "Messina". On 1 December 1941 the two regiments were assigned to the 155th Infantry Division "Emilia", which also included the newly formed 155th Artillery Regiment "Emilia", which had been formed by the 2nd Artillery Regiment "Messina" in Pesaro. The two infantry regiments consisted of a command, a command company, three fusilier battalions, a cannons company equipped with 47/32 anti-tank guns, and a mortar company equipped with 81mm Mod. 35 mortars.

In March 1942 the Emilia division was deployed to Kotor in occupied Montenegro. After the announcement of the Armistice of Cassibile on 8 September 1943 the division concentrated its forces around the Bay of Kotor and formed with the units of the Royal Italian Navy a defense perimeter. The division refused German demands to surrender and on 14 September 1943 went on the offensive and against German forces. On 16 September the division's commander Ugo Buttà ordered the Emilia's units to requisition every vessel in Kotor harbor and sail for Apulia in southern Italy, where British and Italian forces had driven out the Germans. The same evening most of the division managed to reach Apulia, while division's rearguard, the I Battalion of the 120th Infantry Regiment "Emilia", surrendered. For its refusal to surrender to the Germans and its rearguard action the I Battalion was awarded the regiment's second Bronze Medal of Military Valor.

On 1 October 1943 the remnants of Emilia division were merged into the 119th Infantry Regiment "Emilia", which was then assigned to the 152nd Infantry Division "Piceno", while the 120th Infantry Regiment "Emilia" was reformed with battalions from divisions that had been broken during the German invasion of Italy. The new organization of the regiment was as follows:

- 120th Infantry Regiment "Emilia"
  - Command Company
  - I Battalion (ex III Battalion/ 67th Infantry Regiment "Legnano")
  - II Battalion (ex III Battalion/ 68th Infantry Regiment "Legnano")
  - III Battalion (ex III Battalion/ 93rd Infantry Regiment "Messina")
  - Support Weapons Battery (with 65/17 infantry support guns)

The regiment joined the Italian Co-belligerent Army and remained in Apulia until it moved on 22 June 1944 to Naples, where it transferred its battalions to other units and then consisted only of the command company. On 21 August 1944 the regiment merged with the command of the Logistic Base in Piombino and provided logistic support for allied units fighting in the Italian campaign. On 30 June 1945 the regimental command was disbanded.

=== Cold War ===
During the 1975 army reform the army disbanded the regimental level and newly independent battalions were granted for the first time their own flags. On 30 September 1976 the 52nd Infantry Fortification Regiment "Alpi" was disbanded and the next day the regiment's III Battalion in Ipplis was renamed 120th Infantry Fortification Battalion "Fornovo" and assigned the flag and traditions of the 120th Infantry Regiment "Emilia". To avoid confusion with the 155th Heavy Self-propelled Field Artillery Group "Emilia" the battalion's name was changed from "Emilia" to "Fornovo" to commemorate the 1495 A.D. Battle of Fornovo, which was fought by Italian forces against French forces crossing the Emilia region.

The battalion was assigned to the Mechanized Brigade "Isonzo" and consisted of a command, a command and services company, six fortification companies, and seven maintenance squads. The battalion was tasked with manning fortifications of the Alpine Wall between the Natisone river and the border with Yugoslavia from Capriva del Friuli in the South to the valleys just North of Cividale.

For its conduct and work after the 1976 Friuli earthquake the battalion was awarded a Bronze Medal of Army Valor, which was affixed to the battalion's flag and added to the battalion's coat of arms.

In 1986 the Italian Army abolished the divisional level and brigades, which until then had been under one of the Army's four divisions, came under direct command of the Army's 3rd Army Corps or 5th Army Corps. As the Mechanized Division "Mantova" carried the traditions of the 104th Infantry Division "Mantova" and Combat Group "Mantova", which had both fought against the Germans during the Italian campaign of World War II the army decided to retain the name of the division. On 30 September 1986 the Mantova's division command in Udine was disbanded and the next day the command of the Mechanized Brigade "Isonzo" moved from Cividale del Friuli to Udine, where the command was renamed Mechanized Brigade "Mantova". The brigade retained the Isonzo's units, including the 120th Infantry Fortification Battalion "Fornovo".

On 10 October 1986 battalion took over the duty to maintain the fortifications along the Tagliamento river from the disbanded 73rd Infantry Fortification Battalion "Lombardia".

=== Recent times ===
After the end of the Cold War the Italian Army began to draw down its forces and Infantry Fortification units were some of the first units to disband. On 30 November 1991 the 63rd Infantry Fortification Battalion "Cagliari" and 120th Infantry Fortification Battalion "Fornovo" were disbanded and the flags of the 63rd Infantry Regiment "Cagliari" and 120th Infantry Regiment "Emilia" were transferred on 5 December 1991 to the Shrine of the Flags in the Vittoriano in Rome.
