= 213th Coastal Division =

Royal Italian Army infantry division during World War II

- Active: 1941 – 1943
- Country: Kingdom of Italy
- Branch: Royal Italian Army
- Size: Division
- Garrison/HQ: Catania
- Engagements: World War II

Insignia
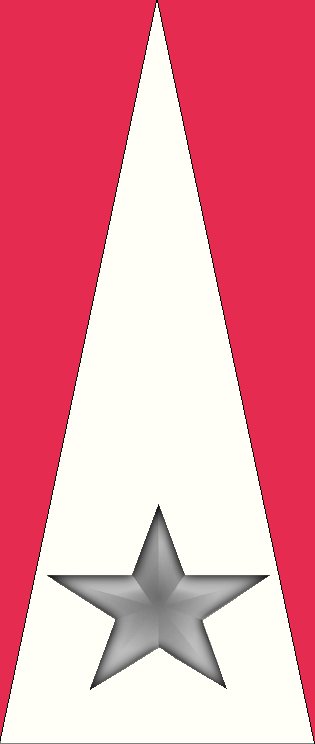
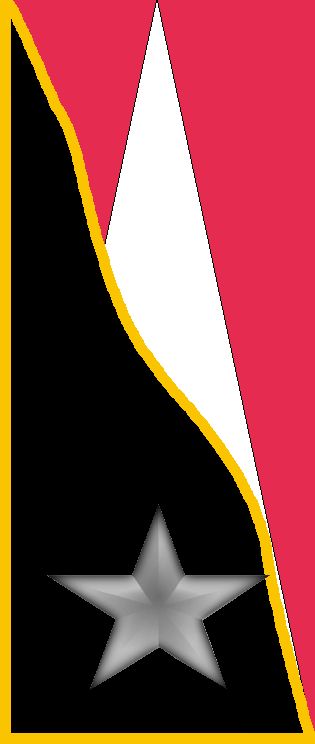
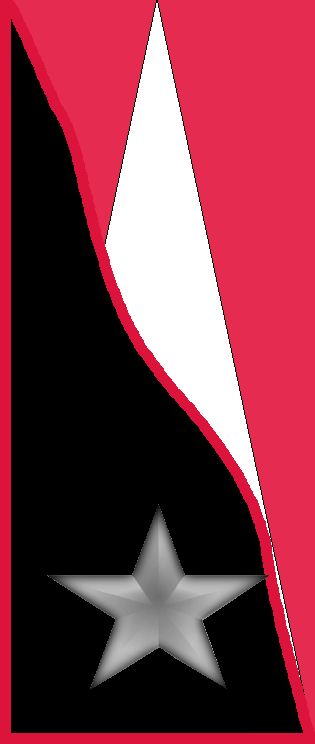
- Identification symbol: 213th Coastal Division gorget patches

The 213th Coastal Division (Italian: 213ª Divisione Costiera) was an infantry division of the Royal Italian Army during World War II. Royal Italian Army coastal divisions were second line divisions formed with reservists and equipped with second rate materiel. Recruited locally, they were often commanded by officers called out of retirement.

== History ==
The division was activated on 15 November 1941 in Catania and assigned to XVI Army Corps, which was responsible for the defense of the eastern half of the island of Sicily. The division was responsible for the coastal defense of the coast between Punta Castelluccio in Agnone Bagni and Moleti south of Messina. The division fought against units of the British Eighth Army after the allies landed on Sicily on 10 July 1943. By 15 July 1943 the division had been severely decimated and was therefore officially declared lost due to wartime events.

== Organization July 1943 ==
- 213th Coastal Division
  - 135th Coastal Regiment
    - CII Coastal Battalion
    - LXVI Replacements Battalion
    - CCCLXIX Coastal Battalion
    - CCCLXXII Coastal Battalion
  - 140th Coastal Regiment (regimental command transferred without its battalion to the XIX Coastal Brigade in May 1943)
    - CCXXVIII Replacements Battalion
    - CCCLXXIII Coastal Battalion
  - 21st Coastal Artillery Regiment
    - XXX Coastal Artillery Group (105/28 cannons)
    - CXLIV Coastal Artillery Group (105/14 mod. 18 howitzers)
    - CCXXX Coastal Artillery Group (100/22 mod. 14/19 howitzers)
  - 553rd Machine Gun Company
  - 554th Machine Gun Company
  - 135th Mixed Engineer Platoon
  - 213th Carabinieri Section
  - 166th Field Post Office
  - Division Services

Attached to the division:

- Harbor Defense Command "H", in Catania
  - CDXXXIV Coastal Battalion
  - CDLXXVII Coastal Battalion
  - XXVI Coastal Artillery Group (75/27 mod. 06 field guns)
  - 105th Mortar Company (81mm mod. 35 mortars)
- Armored Train 120/4/S, in Catania (6 × 102/35 mod. 1914 naval guns, 4 × 20/77 Scotti anti-aircraft guns)

== Commanding officers ==
The division's commanding officers were:

- Generale di Brigata Nazzareno Scattaglia (15 November 1941 - 5 March 1942)
- Generale di Brigata Azzo Passalacqua (acting, 6-15 March 1942)
- Generale di Brigata Nazzareno Scattaglia (16 March 1942 - 9 September 1942)
- Generale di Brigata Ugo Buttà (10 September 1942 - 13 October 1942)
- Generale di Brigata Antonio Tosi (14 October 1942 - 9 May 1943)
- Generale di Brigata Carlo Gotti (9 May 1943 - 15 July 1943)
