= Nazzareno Scattaglia =

Italian general (1887–1975)

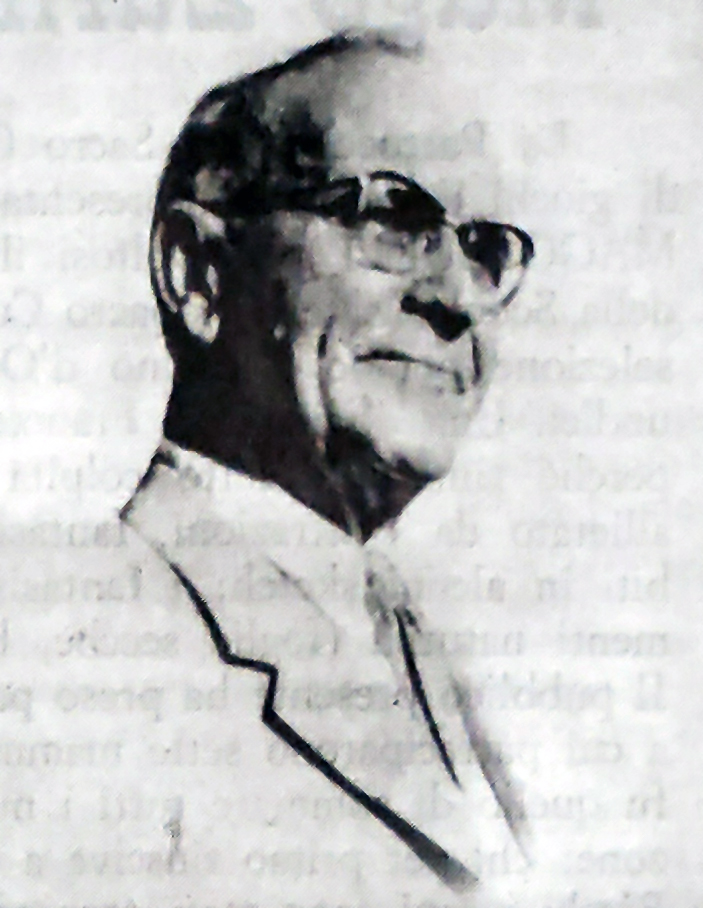
- Born: 24 December 1887; Santeramo in Colle, Kingdom of Italy
- Died: 16 January 1975 (aged 87); Rome, Italy
- Military career
- Allegiance: Kingdom of Italy
- Branch: Royal Italian Army
- Service years: 1908–1946
- Rank: Major General
- Commands: 50th Infantry Regiment "Parma"; Chemical Regiment; 213th Coastal Division; 17th Infantry Division Pavia
- Conflicts: Italo-Turkish War; World War I; Meuse-Argonne Offensive; World War II; Battle of Alam Halfa; Second battle of El Alamein
- Awards: Bronze Medal of Military Valour

Nazzareno Scattaglia (Santeramo in Colle, 24 December 1887 – Rome, 16 January 1975) was an Italian general during World War II.

== Biography ==
He enlisted in the Royal Italian Army in 1908 and enrolled in the Military Academy of Modena, graduating on 17 September 1910 as second lieutenant, assigned to the 19th Infantry Regiment "Brescia".

He fought with the rank of lieutenant during the Italo-Turkish War, earning a Bronze Medal of Military Valour, and then as captain and later as major during the First World War, commanding the 1st Battalion of the 19th Infantry Regiment, "Brescia" Infantry Brigade, from 1 July 1917 to 1 July 1918. In the later part of the war he was part of the Italian II Corps fighting on the Western Front, and participated in the Meuse-Argonne Offensive.

After serving as staff officer, he was promoted to colonel on 1 January 1936 and given command of the 50th Infantry Regiment "Parma" and later of the Chemical Regiment, until 31 August 1941.

On 1 October 1940 he was promoted to brigadier general and stationed in Sicily, as infantry commander of the 54th Infantry Division Napoli infantry division, and on 1 November 1941 he was given command of the newly formed 213th Coastal Division, also stationed in Sicily, which he held until 9 August 1942.

On 20 August 1942 he was sent to Egypt where he assumed command the 17th Infantry Division Pavia, deployed near El Alamein. The division was destroyed during the second battle of El Alamein, and in early November 1942 Scattaglia was captured by the British and sent to the United States as a prisoner of war.

After the Armistice of Cassibile, Scattaglia refused to cooperate with the Allies, and was thus imprisoned with other non-cooperators in a POW Camp in Hereford, Texas, where he was held till February 1946.

In 1948, he joined the newly formed Italian Social Movement and ran at the 1948 Italian general election, but was not elected.

He died in Rome on 16 January 1975.
