= 155th Artillery Regiment "Emilia" =

Inactive Italian Army artillery unit

- 155° Reggimento Artiglieria "Emilia"
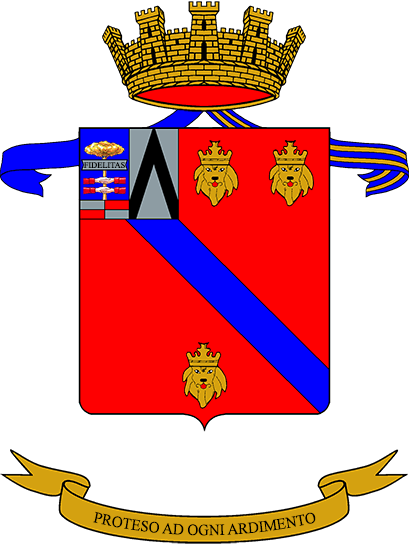
- Regimental coat of arms
- Active: 1 Dec. 1941 — 30 April 1964; 1 Jan. 1976 — 30 June 1992
- Country: Italy
- Branch: Italian Army
- Type: Artillery
- Role: Field artillery
- Part of: 5th Army Corps
- Garrison/HQ: Udine
- Motto: "Proteso ad ogni ardimento"
- Anniversaries: 15 June 1918 - Second Battle of the Piave River
- Decorations: 1x Bronze Medal of Military Valor; 1x Bronze Medal of Army Valor

Insignia
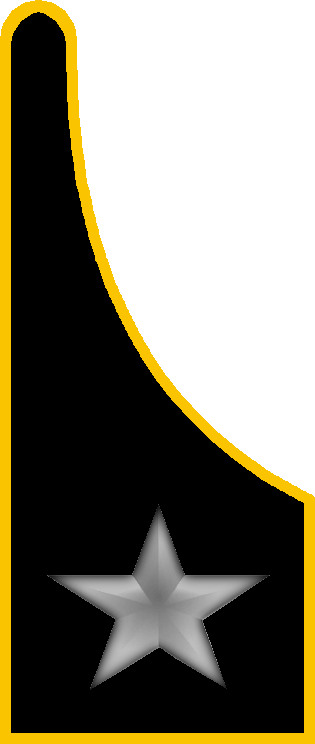
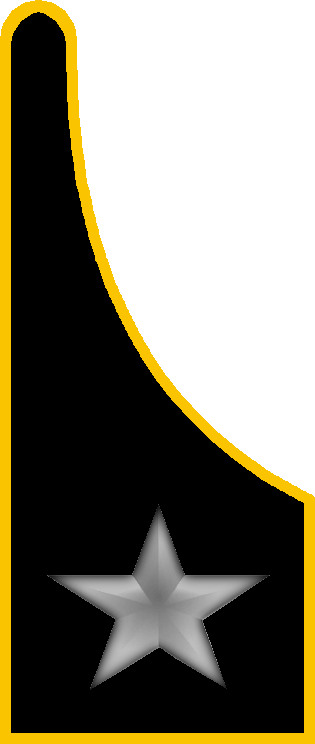
- Regimental gorget patches

The 155th Artillery Regiment "Emilia" (Italian: 155° Reggimento Artiglieria "Emilia") is an inactive field artillery regiment of the Italian Army, which was based in Udine in Friuli-Venezia Giulia. Originally an artillery regiment of the Royal Italian Army, the regiment was assigned in World War II to the 155th Infantry Division "Emilia", with which the regiment was deployed to occupied Montenegro. After the announcement of the Armistice of Cassibile the division and regiment battled Wehrmacht forces near Kotor and then escaped over the Adriatic Sea to Apulia in Southern Italy, where the survivors joined the Italian Co-belligerent Army. In October 1944 the regiment joined the Combat Group "Mantova", which was earmarked to join the British Eighth Army, but the war ended before the Combat Group "Mantova" reached the front. During the Cold War the regiment was assigned to the Infantry Division "Mantova" and from 1976 the Mechanized Division "Folgore". The unit was disbanded in 1992. The regimental anniversary falls, as for all Italian Army artillery regiments, on June 15, the beginning of the Second Battle of the Piave River in 1918.

== History ==
=== World War II ===
On 1 December 1941 the depot of the 2nd Artillery Regiment "Messina" in Ancona formed the 155th Artillery Regiment "Emilia". The regiment consisted of a command, a command unit, the I Group with 100/17 mod. 14 howitzers, and the II Group with 75/27 mod. 06 field guns. The latter group had been formed by the depot of the 3rd Artillery Regiment "Pistoia" in Bologna. After completing its formation the new regiment moved to Pesaro and was assigned to the 155th Infantry Division "Emilia", which also included the 119th Infantry Regiment "Emilia" and 120th Infantry Regiment "Emilia".

In March 1942 the division was transferred to Montenegro for occupation duty. After the announcement of the Armistice of Cassibile on 8 September 1943 the division concentrated its forces around the Bay of Kotor and formed with units of the Royal Italian Navy a defense perimeter. The division refused German demands to surrender and on 14 September 1943 went on the offensive and overran German positions. On 15 September the Germans were reinforced and began an intense aerial bombardment of the Emilia's positions. On 16 September the division's commander Ugo Buttà ordered the Emilia's units to requisition every vessel in Kotor harbor and sail for Apulia in Southern Italy, where British and Italian forces had driven out the Germans. The same evening most of the division managed to reach Apulia, while the division's rearguard, the I Battalion of the 120th Infantry Regiment "Emilia", surrendered.

For its conduct at the Bay of Kotor the regiment was awarded a Bronze Medal of Military Valor, which was affixed to the regiment's flag and is depicted on the regiment's coat of arms.

On 1 October 1943 the division was disbanded and its regiments reassigned to other divisions of the Italian Co-belligerent Army. The 155th Artillery Regiment "Emilia" had lost all its equipment and had to be rebuilt. On 1 January 1944 the regiment consisted of a command, a command unit, the I and II groups with 100/17 mod. 14 howitzers, the CCXIV Group with 100/22 mod. 14/19 howitzers, and an anti-aircraft section with 20/65 mod. 35 anti-aircraft guns. The CCXIV Group had been transferred from the 58th Artillery Regiment "Legnano". On 10 February 1944 the regiment was assigned to the 104th Infantry Division "Mantova". On 8 March 1944 the regiment was reorganized and consisted now of a command, a command unit, the I Group with 100/22 mod. 14/19 howitzers, the II Group with 100/22 mod. 14/19 howitzers (former CCXIV Group merged with the CCLVI Group), the III Group with 75/27 mod. 06 field guns, and the 811th Anti-aircraft Battery with 20/65 mod. 35 anti-aircraft guns. On 1 June 1944 the regiment received the IV Group with 100/22 mod. 14/19 howitzers and the 29th Anti-aircraft Battery with 20/65 mod. 35 anti-aircraft guns. On 1 September the regiment added the V Group with 105/32 field guns.

On 1 October 1944 the 104th Infantry Division "Mantova" was reorganized as Combat Group "Mantova", which was equipped with British materiel. Consequently, all groups of the 155th Artillery Regiment "Emilia" were equipped with British artillery pieces:

- 155th Artillery Regiment "Emilia"
  - Command Unit
  - I Group with QF 25-pounder field guns
  - II Group with QF 25-pounder field guns
  - III Group with QF 25-pounder field guns
  - IV Group with QF 25-pounder field guns
  - V Group with QF 17-pounder anti-tank guns
  - VI Group with 40/56 anti-aircraft autocannons (formed with the personnel of the 29th and 811th anti-aircraft batteries)
  - 2 × mobile workshops

By spring 1945 the combat group was ready to join the British Eighth Army, but it arrived at the front just as the German forces had surrendered.

=== Cold War ===
After the war the regiment was based in Piacenza. On 15 October 1945 the Combat Group "Mantova" was reorganized as Infantry Division "Mantova". In September 1946 the regiment ceded four of its groups to help reform other regiments: the II and IV groups were transferred to the 5th Field Artillery Regiment, the V Group to the 18th Anti-tank Field Artillery Regiment, and the VI Group to the 4th Light Anti-aircraft Artillery Regiment. Afterwards the regiment reformed the II Group and then consisted of a command, a command unit, and the I, II, and III groups with QF 25-pounder field guns. The same year the regiment moved from Piacenza to Bra.

In 1947 the regiment moved from Bra to Udine, where it began to replace the British materiel with American materiel. On 1 January 1951 the Infantry Division "Mantova" included the following artillery regiments:

- Infantry Division "Mantova", in Gorizia
  - 3rd Field Artillery Regiment, in Gradisca d'Isonzo
  - 5th Field Artillery Regiment, in Palmanova
  - 18th Anti-tank Field Artillery Regiment, in Udine
  - 155th Field Artillery Regiment, in Udine
  - 4th Light Anti-aircraft Artillery Regiment, in Cervignano del Friuli

On 30 June 1951 the Italian Army's artillery was reorganized and the next day the regiment consisted of the following units:

- 155th Field Artillery Regiment, in Udine
  - Command Unit
  - I Group with M101 105 mm howitzers
  - II Group with M101 105 mm howitzers
  - III Light Anti-aircraft Group with 40/56 anti-aircraft autocannons (from the 4th Light Anti-aircraft Artillery Regiment)
  - Anti-tank Sub-grouping
    - IV Group with QF 17-pounder anti-tank guns (from the 18th Anti-tank Field Artillery Regiment)
    - V Group with QF 17-pounder anti-tank guns (from the 18th Anti-tank Field Artillery Regiment)

On 1 March 1954 the regiment was reorganized and ceded its I, II, III, and V groups to other regiments, while the IV Group was renamed IV Self-propelled Field Group and equipped with self-propelled Sexton howitzers. The regiment also received the Self-propelled Anti-tank Sub-grouping, which consisted of the CI and CII self-propelled anti-tank groups with M18 Hellcat tank destroyers. Consequently the regiment was renamed 155th Self-propelled Army Corps Artillery Regiment and assigned to the 5th Army Corps. On 1 August of the same year the regiment received from the 33rd Field Artillery Regiment the 3rd Self-propelled Anti-tank Sub-grouping, which consisted of the CXIII e CXIV self-propelled anti-tank groups with M36 tank destroyers. On 1 January 1957 the regiment's IV Self-propelled Field Group became an autonomous unit and left the regiment, which on the same date was renamed 155th Self-propelled Anti-tank Artillery Regiment. The same year the CI and CII self-propelled anti-tank groups replaced their M18 Hellcats with M36 tank destroyers. On 30 April 1964 the 155th Self-propelled Anti-tank Artillery Regiment was disbanded and the next day the regiment's personnel and materiel were used to form the 27th Heavy Self-propelled Artillery Regiment. Afterwards the flag of the 155th Artillery Regiment "Emilia" was transferred to the Shrine of the Flags in the Vittoriano in Rome.

During the 1975 army reform the army disbanded the regimental level and newly independent battalions and groups were granted for the first time their own flags. On 31 December 1975 the 5th Field Artillery Regiment of the Infantry Division "Mantova" was disbanded and the next day the regiment's III Field Artillery Group in Udine was reorganized and renamed 155th Heavy Self-propelled Field Artillery Group "Emilia". The group was assigned to the Artillery Command of the Mechanized Division "Mantova" and consisted of a command, a command and services battery, and three batteries with M109G 155 mm self-propelled howitzers.

On 12 November 1976 the group was assigned the flag and traditions of the 155th Artillery Regiment "Emilia" by decree 846 of the President of the Italian Republic Giovanni Leone. At the time the group fielded 477 men (38 officers, 62 non-commissioned officers, and 377 soldiers).

In June 1981 the group was equipped with modern towed FH70 155 mm howitzers and changed its name to 155th Heavy Field Artillery Group "Emilia". For its conduct and work after the 1976 Friuli earthquake the group was awarded a Bronze Medal of Army Valor, which was affixed to the group's flag and added to the group's coat of arms.

In 1986 the Italian Army abolished the divisional level and so on 30 September 1986 the Mechanized Division "Mantova" was disbanded. The next day the group was assigned to the Artillery Command of the 5th Army Corps. On 1 December 1991 the group entered the 5th Heavy Field Artillery Regiment. Half a year later, on 30 June 1992, the 155th Heavy Field Artillery Group "Emilia" was disbanded and on 24 November of the same year the flag of the 155th Artillery Regiment "Emilia" was returned to the Shrine of the Flags in the Vittoriano in Rome.
