= Passalacqua =

Passalacqua is an Italian surname. Notable people with the surname include:

- Connie Passalacqua Hayman, American journalist
- Juan Manuel García Passalacqua (1937–2010), Puerto Rican lawyer, writer and political analyst
- Ubaldo Passalacqua (1918–?), Italian footballer
- Azzo Passalacqua (1885-1967), Italian general
- Joe Pass, (1929-1994) American guitarist, was born Joseph Anthony Passalaqua
