= San Bartolomeo Apostolo, Floridia =

Church building in Floridia, Italy

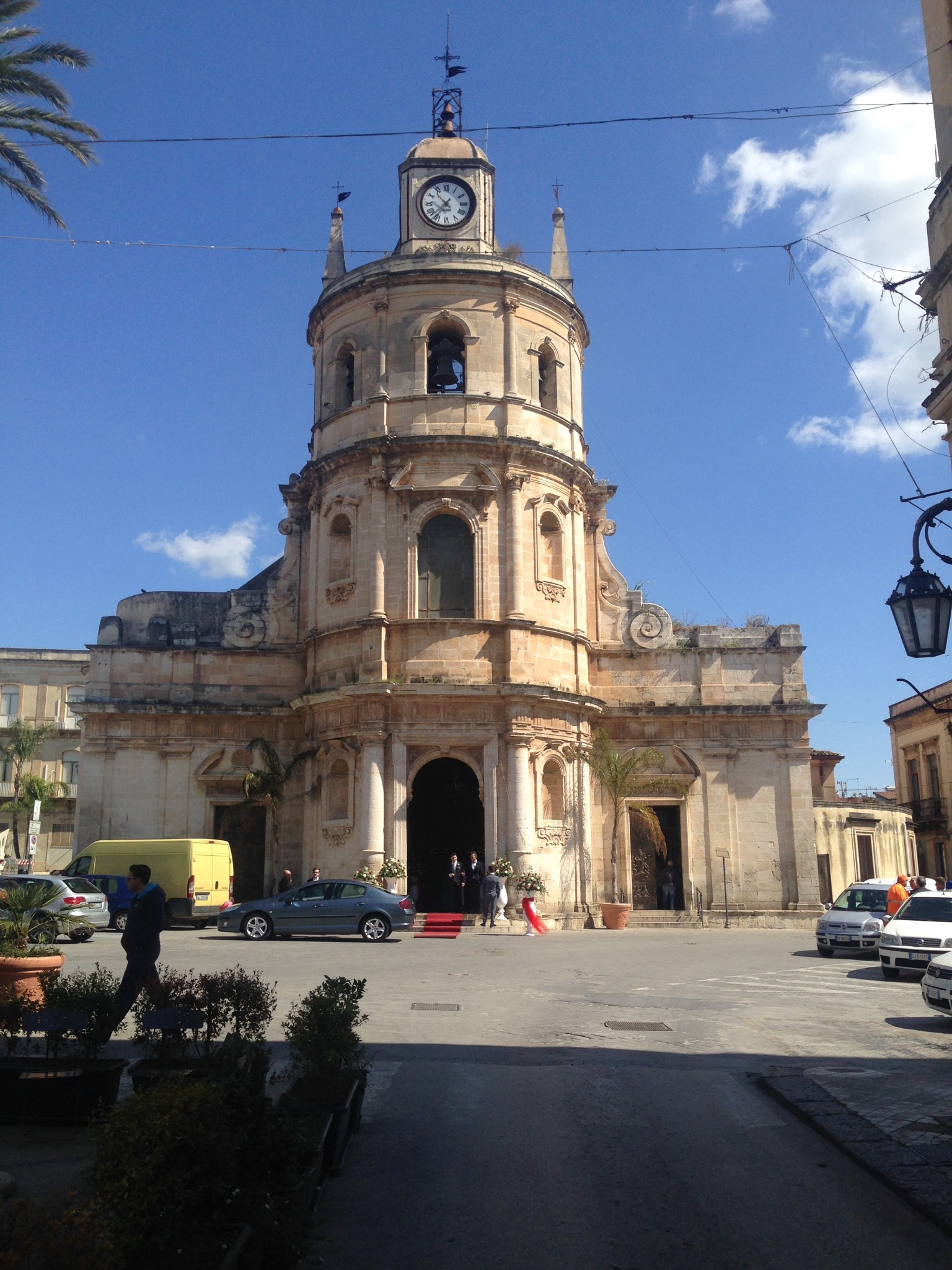
Facade of church

San Bartolomeo is a Baroque-style mother church, or chiesa madre, located on Via Francesco Crispi #1 in the town of Floridia, in the Province of Siracusa, region of Sicily, Italy.

== History and description ==
A prior mother church located in the prior old town and dedicated to the Madonna of the Providence, was razed by the 1693 Sicily earthquake. By 1748, the local Duke Ignazio Migliaccio commissioned construction of a new mother church in the central piazza of this then-newly planned urban center.

The facade is surmounted by a cylindrical tower with a clock superiorly along with bells. The portal reliefs are modern, completed in 2003-2004 by Romeo Sandrin. The reliefs on the right door depict episodes of the Old Testament, while those on the left depict the new Testament. The central portal has scenes of the life of Mary and five sacraments: baptism, communion, marriage, confirmation, and extreme unction.
