= 155th Infantry Division "Emilia" =

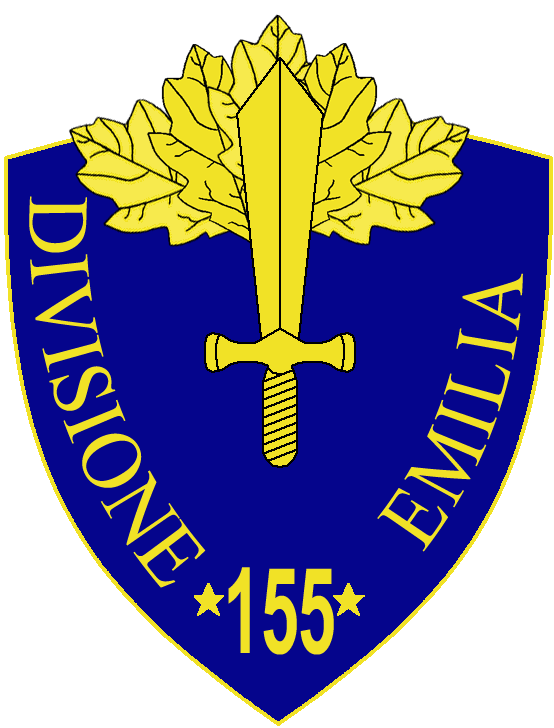
- 155th Infantry Division "Emilia" insignia
- Active: 1 December 1941– 1 October 1943
- Country: Kingdom of Italy
- Branch: Royal Italian Army
- Type: Infantry
- Size: Division
- Engagements: Second World War

Insignia
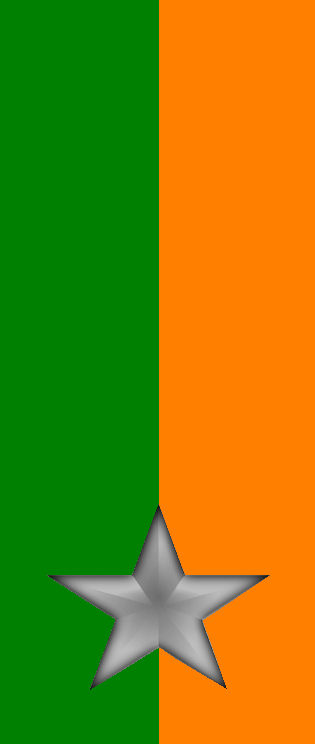
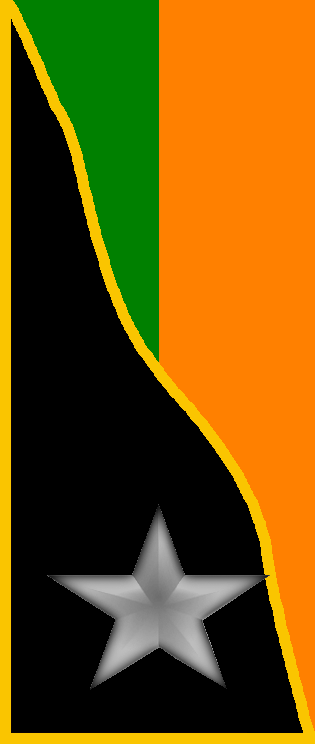
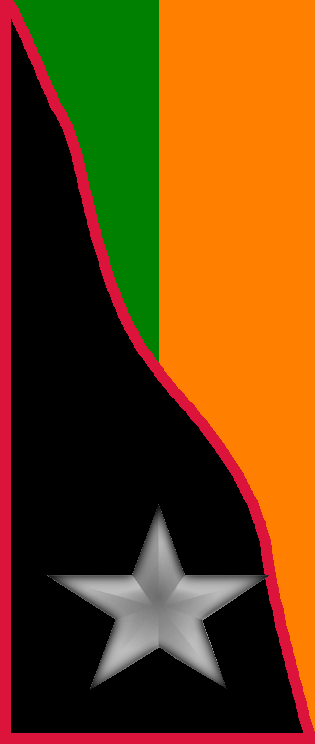
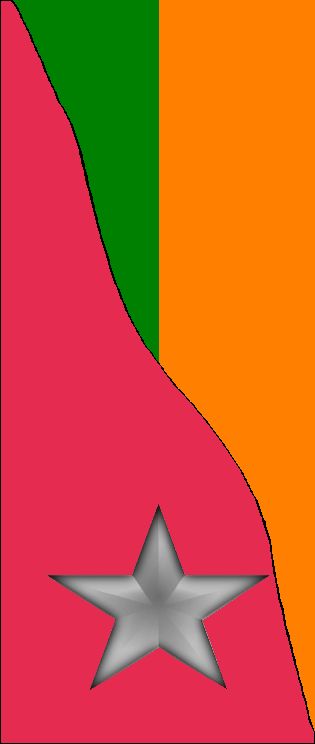
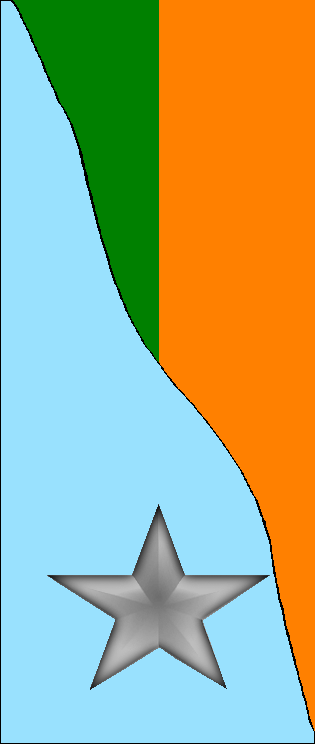
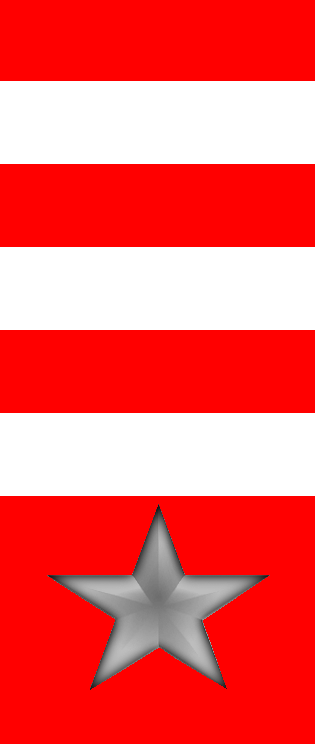
- Identification symbol: Emilia Division gorget patches

The 155th Infantry Division "Emilia" (Italian: 155ª Divisione di fanteria "Emilia") was an infantry division of the Royal Italian Army during the World War II. The Emilia was formed on 1 December 1941 and named for the historic region of Emilia. The Emilia was classified as an occupation infantry division, which meant that the division's artillery regiment consisted of two artillery groups instead of the three artillery groups of line infantry divisions and that the divisional mortar battalion was replaced by a divisional machine gun battalion.

In April 1942 the division was sent to Dalmatia to fight Yugoslav Partisans. After the announcement of the Armistice of Cassibile on 8 September 1943 the division fought advancing German forces for eight days, before crossing the Adriatic Sea to reach Apulia in Southern Italy, where the division's survivors joined forces with the Italian Co-belligerent Army.

== History ==
=== World War I ===
The division's lineage begins with the Brigade "Emilia" raised in Bologna in March 1915 with the 119th and 120th infantry regiments. The brigade fought on the Italian front in World War I and together with its regiments was disbanded after the war in December 1919.

=== World War II ===
The 155th Infantry Division "Emilia" was activated in Ancona on 1 December 1941 and consisted of the 119th Infantry Regiment "Emilia", 120th Infantry Regiment "Emilia", and the 155th Artillery Regiment "Emilia". As a division raised during the war the Emilia did not have its own regimental depots and therefore its regiments were raised by the depots of the 18th Infantry Division "Messina": the 119th Infantry Regiment "Emilia" was raised in Ancona on 15 October 1941 by the 93rd Infantry Regiment "Messina" and the 120th Infantry Regiment "Emilia" was raised in Fano on 15 October 1941 by the 94th Infantry Regiment "Messina", while the 155th Artillery Regiment "Emilia" was raised in Pesaro on 1 December 1941 by the 2nd Artillery Regiment "Messina".

The division left its bases in the Marche region on 18 March 1942 and was shipped from Bari to Kotor in Montenegro, where it assembled on 24 March. The division based its headquarter Kotor, with its units garrisoned in Kumbor and Herceg Novi, along the coast to Budva, along the Gruda-Zelenika railway, and later also in Nikšić. The division hardly saw any combat as the activities of the Yugoslav partisans in the Emilia's area of operation were minimal. Only when the division took over the Nikšić sector from the 151st Infantry Division "Perugia" did sporadic fighting erupt in Grahovo, Vilusi and Trubjela.

After the announcement of the Armistice of Cassibile on 8 September 1943 the division concentrated its forces around the Bay of Kotor and formed with the units of the Royal Italian Navy a defense perimeter. The division refused German demands to surrender. On 14 September the division went on the offensive and overran German positions at Prevlaka, Lepetani, and Trojica, and on the Vrmac and Kobyla mountains. Only the German bases at Gruda and in Kotor managed to resist. On 15 September the Germans were reinforced at Gruda and began an intense aerial bombardment of the Emilia's positions. In the afternoon German forces began an offensive from Gruda, Trebinje, Nikšić, and Cetinje.

On 16 September the division's commander Ugo Buttà ordered the Emilia's units to requisition every vessel in Kotor harbor and sail for Apulia in Southern Italy, where British and Italian forces had driven out the Germans. The same evening most of the division managed to reach Apulia, while the division's rearguard, the I Battalion of the 120th Infantry Regiment, surrendered. On 1 October 1943 the division was dissolved and its regiments reassigned to other divisions of the Italian Co-belligerent Army:

- 119th Infantry Regiment "Emilia", was reformed with the survivors of the Emilia division was initially assigned to the 152nd Infantry Division "Piceno", and then transferred to the 104th Infantry Division "Mantova" on 10 February 1944
- 120th Infantry Regiment "Emilia", was reformed with units of other regiments:
  - I Battalion, former III Battalion/ 67th Infantry Regiment "Legnano"
  - II Battalion, former III Battalion/ 68th Infantry Regiment "Legnano"
  - III Battalion, former III Battalion/ 93rd Infantry Regiment "Messina"
- 155th Artillery Regiment "Emilia", had lost all its equipment and was reformed with British materiel and assigned to the 104th Infantry Division "Mantova" on 10 February 1944

== Organization ==
155th Infantry Division "Emilia" organization

- 155th Infantry Division "Emilia"
  - Headquarters
    - Command Company
    - 134th Carabinieri Section
    - 135th Carabinieri Section
    - 155th Field Post Office
    - 155th Infantry Division Command Transport Squad
  - 119th Infantry Regiment "Emilia"
    - Command Company
    - 3 × Fusilier battalions
    - Cannons Company (47/32 mod. 35 anti-tank guns)
    - Mortar Company (81mm Mod. 35 mortars)
  - 120th Infantry Regiment "Emilia"
    - Command Company
    - 3 × Fusilier battalions
    - Cannons Company (47/32 mod. 35 anti-tank guns)
    - Mortar Company (81mm Mod. 35 mortars)
  - 155th Artillery Regiment "Emilia"
    - Command Unit
    - I Group (100/17 mod. 14 howitzers)
    - II Group (75/27 mod. 06 field guns; formed by the depot of the 3rd Artillery Regiment "Pistoia")
    - 1 × Anti-aircraft battery (20/65 Mod. 35 anti-aircraft guns)
    - Ammunition and Supply Unit
  - CCLV Machine Gun Battalion
  - CLV Mixed Engineer Battalion
    - 155th Engineer Company
    - 255th Telegraph and Radio Operators Company
  - 355th Anti-tank Company (47/32 mod. 35 anti-tank guns; transferred to the 5th Infantry Division "Cosseria" for the deployment in the Soviet Union)
  - 155th Medical Section
    - 2 × Field hospitals
    - 1 × Surgical unit
  - 155th Supply Section
  - 1120th Transport Section

Attached to the division during its deployment in Montenegro:

- 4th Bersaglieri Regiment
  - Command Company
  - XXVI Battalion
  - XXIX Battalion
  - XXXI Battalion
  - 4th Motorcyclists Company
  - 4th Anti-tank Company (47/32 mod. 35 anti-tank guns)
- XXV Carabinieri Battalion
- LXXXI CC.NN. Battalion
- 135th Volunteer Formation "Val Zupa" (Montenegrin Anti-Communist Volunteer Militia)
- 415th Mortar Company (81mm mod. 35 mortars)

== Commanding officers ==
The division's commanding officers were:

- Generale di Divisione Giuseppe Romano (1 December 1941 - 4 April 1943)
- Colonel Vittorio Alfieri (acting, 5–25 April 1943)
- Generale di Brigata Ugo Buttà (25 April 1943 - 1 October 1943)
