= Chiesa del Carmine, Floridia =

Baroque Church in Sicily

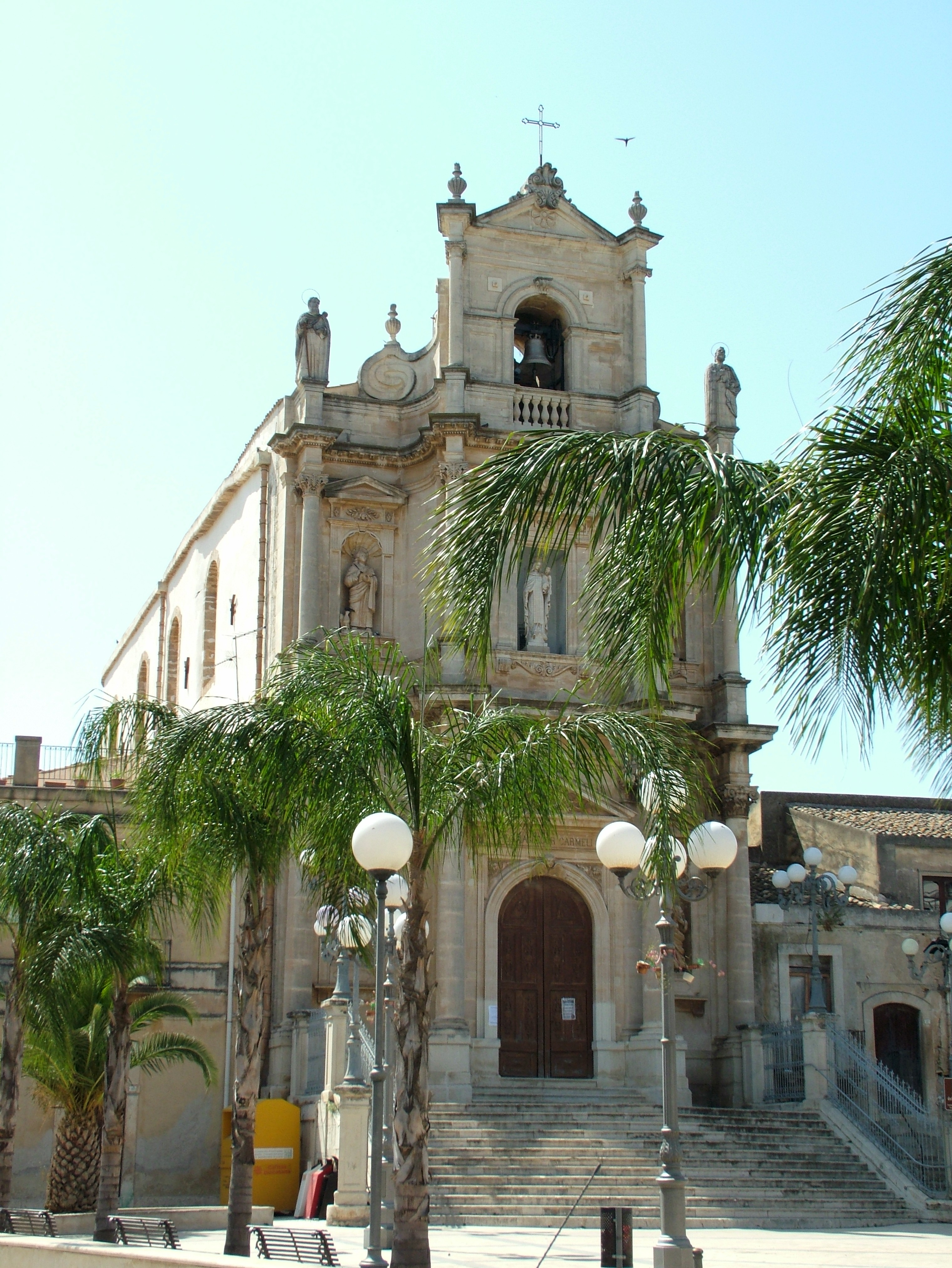
Facade of church

The Chiesa del Carmine is a Baroque-style church located on Via Vincenzo Bellini #57 in the town of Floridia, in the Province of Siracusa, region of Sicily, Italy.

== History and description ==
Also known as the Church of the Beata Vergine Maria di Monte Carmelo (Blessed Virgin Mary of Mount Carmel) or Madonna del Carmine, this church was built in the 18th century at the site of a former chapel dedicated to the Anime del Purgatorio (Souls in Purgatory). The church has a large crypt with an ossuary that was used for burials in prior centuries.

The tower-like facade has three orders and is surmounted by a bell-tower. The facade is preceded by a broad staircase. The central niche has a statue depicting the Madonna del Carmine, while the four flanking niches depict the four evangelist. In the top roofline are statues of St Peter and St Paul. The interior is highly decorated with stuccoes, bas reliefs, and altarpieces. The church, which was affiliated with the Reformed order of Carmelites, houses an altarpiece depicting the Madonna before the Souls of Purgatory (1714) by Martino Italia.
