= Priolo Gargallo =

- Comune
- Comune di Priolo Gargallo
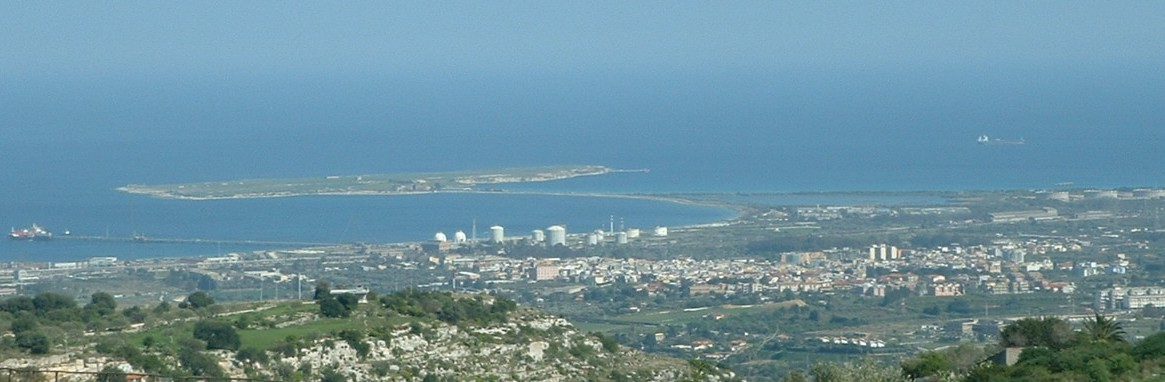

- Location within Italy Location within Sicily
- Coordinates: 37°10′N 15°11′E
- Country: Italy
- Region: Sicily
- Province: Syracuse (SR)

Government
  - Mayor: Giuseppe Gianni

Area
  - Total: 56.92 km^{2} (21.98 sq mi)
- Elevation: 30 m (98 ft)

Population (30 November 2017)
  - Total: 11,892
  - Density: 208.9/km^{2} (541.1/sq mi)
- Demonym: Priolesi
- Time zone: UTC+1 (CET)
  - Summer (DST): UTC+2 (CEST)
- Postal code: 96010
- Dialing code: 0931
- Website: Official website

Priolo Gargallo (Sicilian: U Priolu) is a comune (municipality) in the Province of Syracuse, Sicily (southern Italy). It is about 190 kilometres (120 mi) southeast of Palermo and about 13 kilometres (8 mi) northwest of Syracuse.

The name Priolo Gargallo comes from the nobleman Marquis Gargallo who owned land in this part of Sicily.

Priolo Gargallo borders the following municipalities: Melilli, Syracuse, Solarino, Sortino.

== Economy ==
The municipality of Priolo Gargallo is recognized as the operational base for the Priolo Gargallo complex. This industrial site incorporates the two distinct but integrated refineries, known as ISAB Nord and ISAB Sud, which are positioned within the complex. Both facilities are under the ownership and control of the Russian energy conglomerate, Lukoil.

These two refineries are functionally linked by a network of pipelines and operate cohesively, enabling them to achieve a combined crude oil processing capacity of 16 million metric tons per year.
