= Premariacco =

Premariacco Premariâs (Friulian)
- Comune
- Comune di Premariacco; Comun di Premariâs
- Coat of arms

- Location within Italy Location within Friuli-Venezia Giulia
- Coordinates: 46°4′N 13°24′E
- Country: Italy
- Region: Friuli-Venezia Giulia
- Province: Udine (UD)
- Frazioni: Azzano, Firmano, Ipplis, Leproso, Orsaria, Paderno

Area
  - Total: 39.43 km^{2} (15.22 sq mi)
- Elevation: 110 m (360 ft)

Population (31 December 2005)
  - Total: 4,065
  - Density: 103.1/km^{2} (267.0/sq mi)
- Time zone: UTC+1 (CET)
  - Summer (DST): UTC+2 (CEST)
- Postal code: 33040
- Dialing code: 0432
- Saint day: December 31
- Website: Official website

Premariacco (Friulian: Premariâs, Slovene: Premarjag) is a comune (municipality) in the Regional decentralization entity of Udine in the Italian region of Friuli-Venezia Giulia, located about 60 kilometres (37 mi) northwest of Trieste and about 13 kilometres (8 mi) east of Udine.

Premariacco borders the following municipalities: Buttrio, Cividale del Friuli, Corno di Rosazzo, Manzano, Moimacco, Pradamano, Remanzacco.

Paulinus II of Aquileia, the Patriarch of Aquileia and one of the most eminent scholars of the Carolingian Renaissance, was born in Premariacco around 726.

== Demographic evolution ==
Historical population

| Year | Pop. | ±% |
|---|---|---|
| 1861 | ? | — |
| 1871 | 3,577 | — |
| 1881 | 3,443 | −3.7% |
| 1901 | 3,806 | +10.5% |
| 1911 | 3,925 | +3.1% |

| Year | Pop. | ±% |
|---|---|---|
| 1921 | 3,950 | +0.6% |
| 1931 | 3,905 | −1.1% |
| 1936 | 3,663 | −6.2% |
| 1951 | 3,670 | +0.2% |
| 1961 | 3,288 | −10.4% |

| Year | Pop. | ±% |
|---|---|---|
| 1971 | 3,296 | +0.2% |
| 1981 | 3,713 | +12.7% |
| 1991 | 3,784 | +1.9% |
| 2001 | 4,001 | +5.7% |

Source: Data from ISTAT

== Notable people ==
- Saint Paulinus II - born c. 730; Patriarch of Aquileia 787–802
- Fiore dei Liberi - ca. 1350–1420, medieval fencing master

== Gallery ==
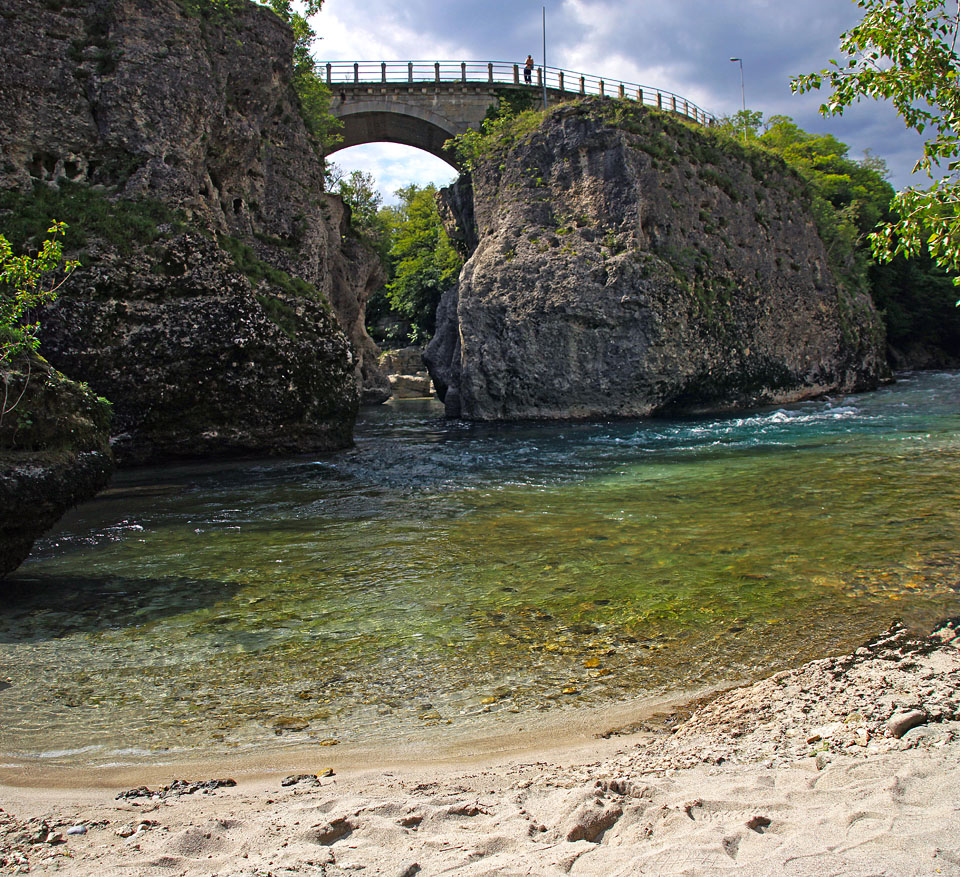
Ponte Romano

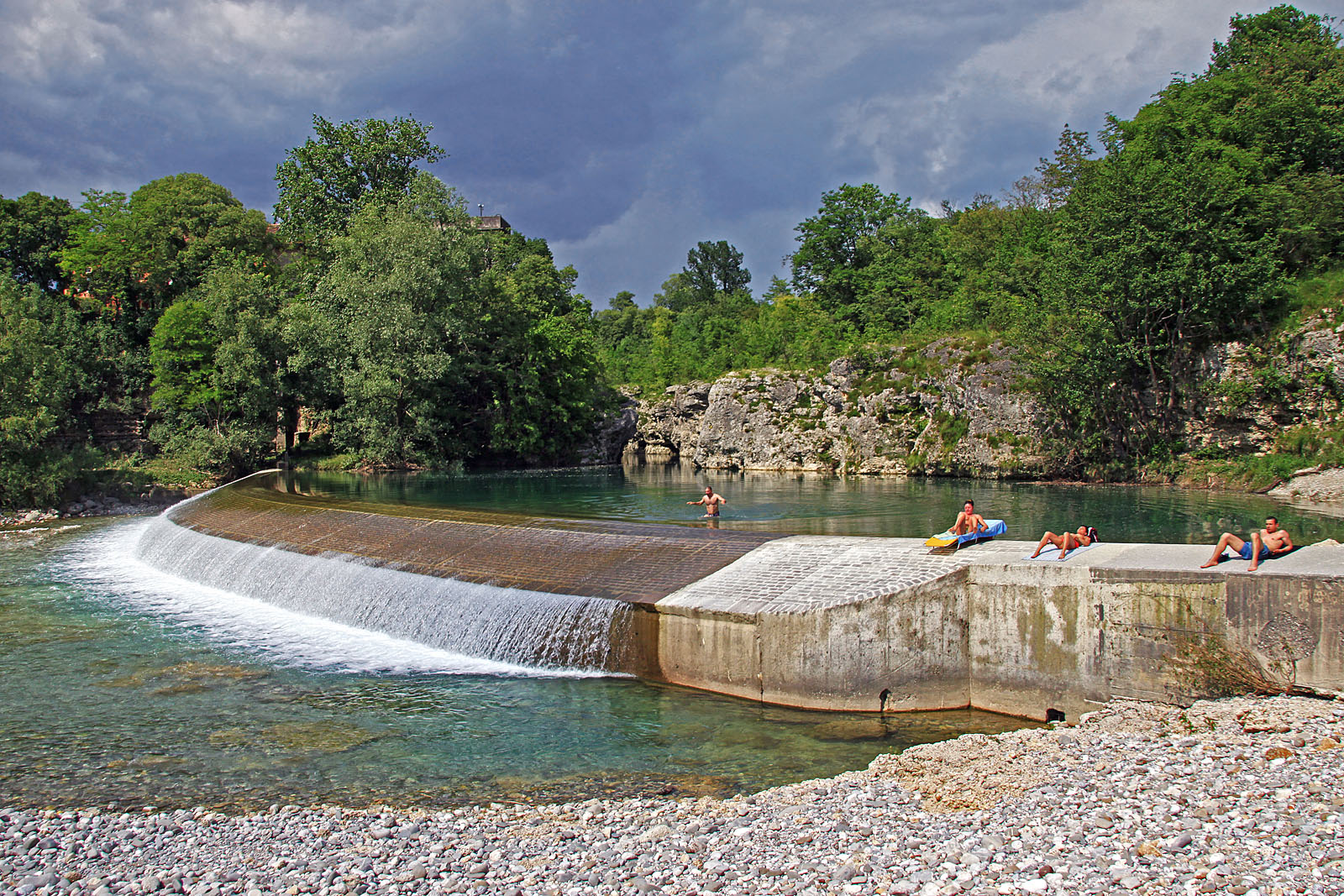
Premariacco beach

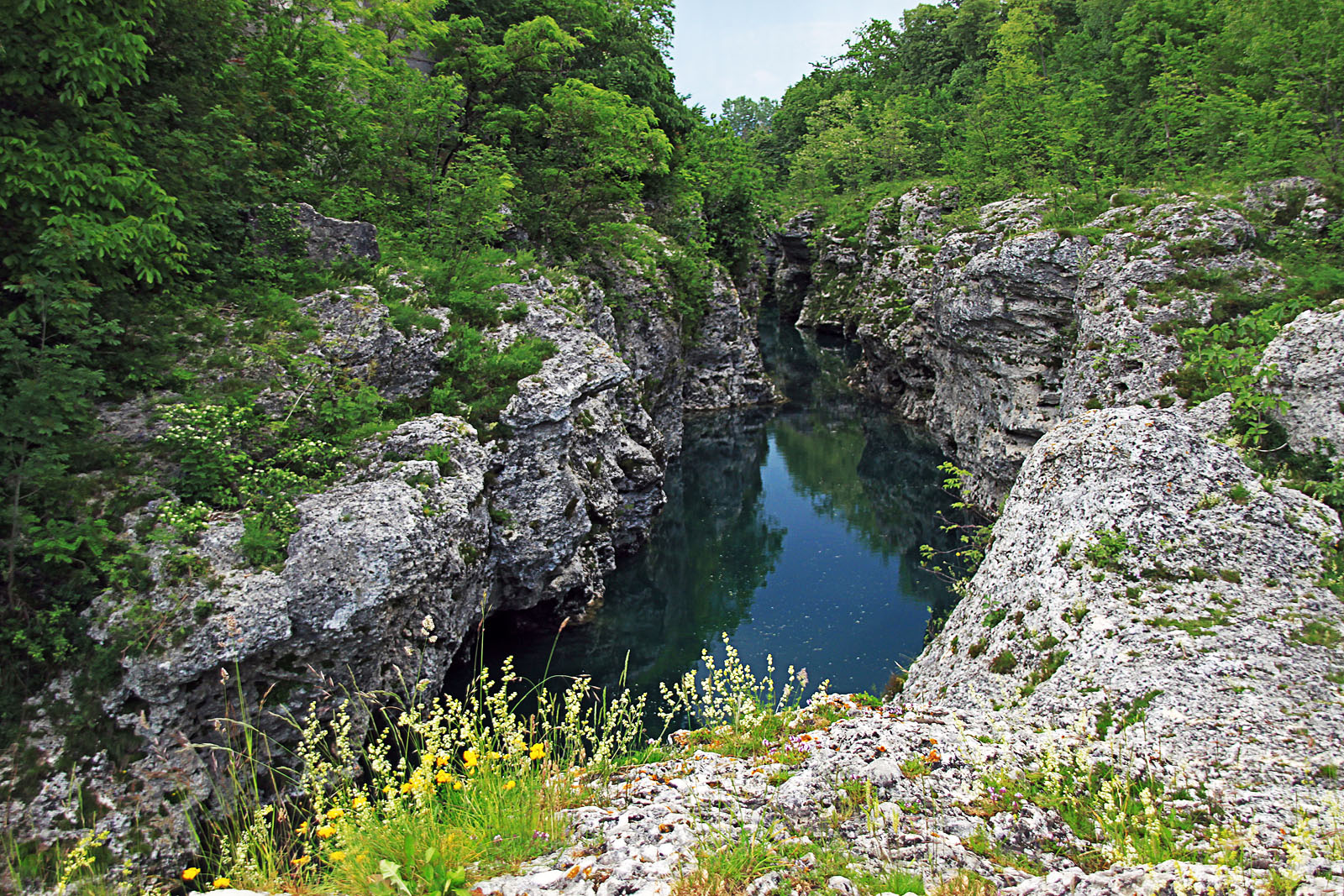
Natisone canyon at Premariacco

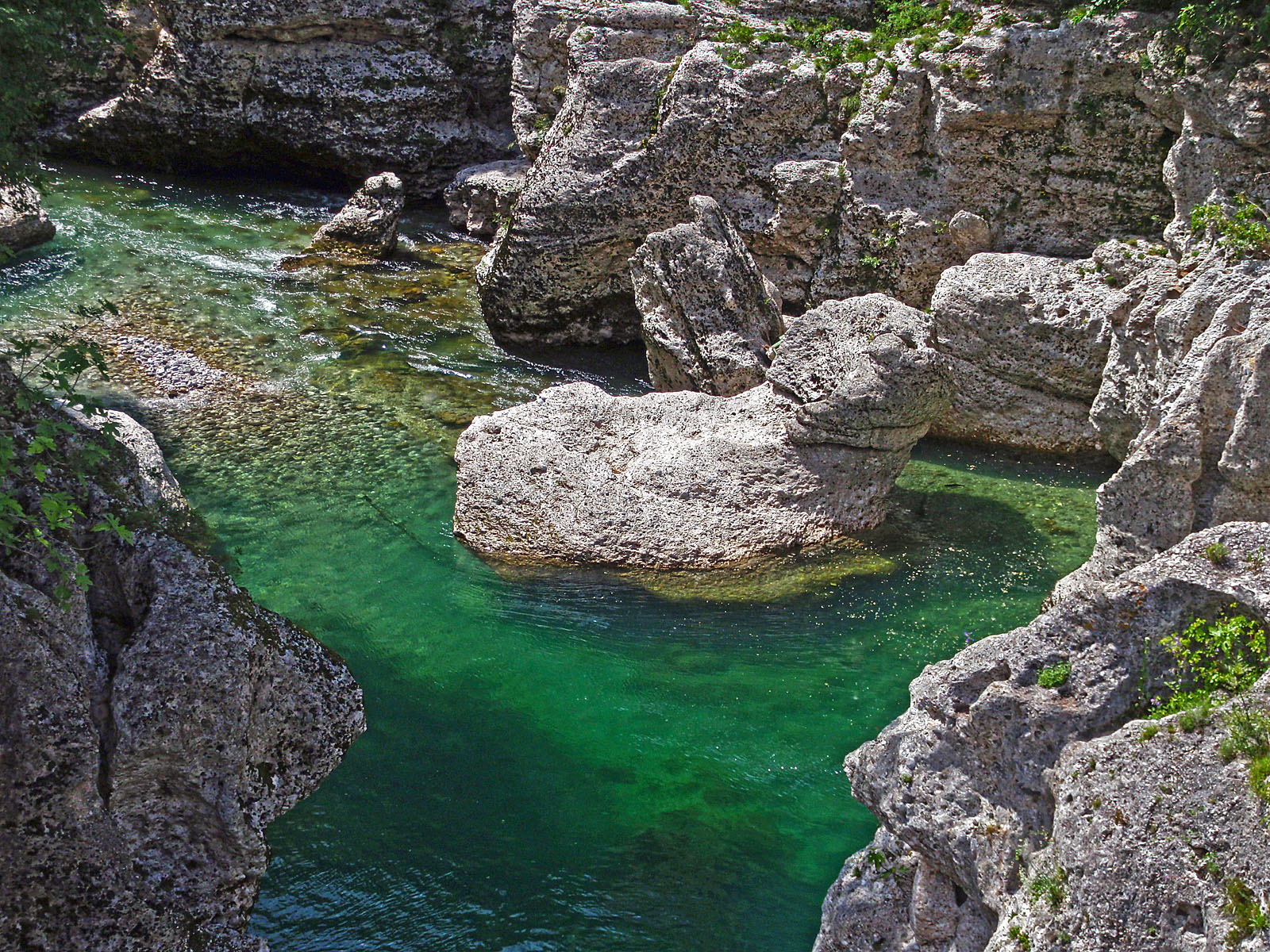
Conglomerate river bed of Natisone
