= Azzo Passalacqua =

Italian general

- Born: 2 July 1885; Morro Reatino, Kingdom of Italy
- Died: 4 February 1961 (aged 75); Rome, Italy
- Military career
- Allegiance: Kingdom of Italy
- Branch: Royal Italian Army
- Rank: Brigadier General
- Commands: 4th Coastal Brigade Sector; 8th Coastal Brigade Sector; Catania Port Defense
- Conflicts: World War I; Battles of the Isonzo; Battle of the Piave river; Battle of Monte Grappa; Battle of Vittorio Veneto; World War II; Allied invasion of Sicily
- Awards: Silver Medal of Military Valor; Order of the Crown of Italy

Azzo Passalacqua (2 July 1885 – 7 September 1967) was an Italian general during World War II.

== Biography ==
He was born in 1885 in the province of Rieti, the son of Anastasio Passalacqua. He attended the Military Academy of Modena in 1907–1908, graduating with the rank of second lieutenant, assigned to the 2nd Bersaglieri Regiment. He participated in the First World War fighting in the Carnic Alps, on the Karst Plateau, on the Piave river and on Monte Grappa, earning a Silver Medal of Military Valor and reaching the rank of major.

On June 16, 1934, Passalacqua was promoted to colonel and assigned to the headquarters of the 21st Infantry Division Granatieri di Sardegna in Rome. In October 1939 he was briefly attached to the Fast Army Corps. After the outbreak of the Second World War he held the command of the 4th Coastal Brigade Sector in Sardinia from 1 April to 31 July 1941 and then of the 8th Coastal Brigade Sector in Sicily from 1 August to 14 November 1941. From 15 November he was transferred to the headquarters of the XII Army Corps in Palermo. On 1 December 1941 he was transferred to the Army reserve and promoted to brigadier general, being then given command of Difesa Porto E, the ad hoc unit (consisting of two coastal infantry battalions, a coastal artillery group and a mortar company) tasked with the defense of the port of Catania from 16 April 1942. By decree of 18 September 1942 he was made Commander of the Order of the Crown of Italy.

After the Allied landings in Sicily, on 10 July 1943, Catania became one of the main targets of the British Eighth Army. After the rapid fall of nearby Augusta and Syracuse, Passalacqua took harsh measures to quell the growing desertions among his men; he set up roadblocks, ordered to carry out roll calls four times a day in order to quickly find out if anyone had gone AWOL, and instructed his subordinates to immediately hunt down and execute deserters with summary judgment. On 15 July he personally presided over a drumhead court-martial that sentenced to death by firing squad a MILMART officer, capomanipolo (lieutenant) Giuseppe Catanzaro, for having abandoned the battery under his command, located near the Simeto river, along with all his men. Catanzaro claimed that he had been ordered to destroy the guns and retreat towards Messina by a superior; after the war, in 1955, he was rehabilitated and acquitted with a sentence of the Court of Cassation.

During the battle for Catania, Passalacqua was repeatedly called by telephone by Benito Mussolini (until 22 July), worried by the nonarrival of the reinforcements that were expected to hold the city. On 5 August, a few hours before Catania fell to the British, he was ordered to withdraw from Catania with his surviving troops.

Passalacqua died in 1967 in Rome and was buried at the Verano cemetery.
