= Solarino =

- Comune
- Comune di Solarino
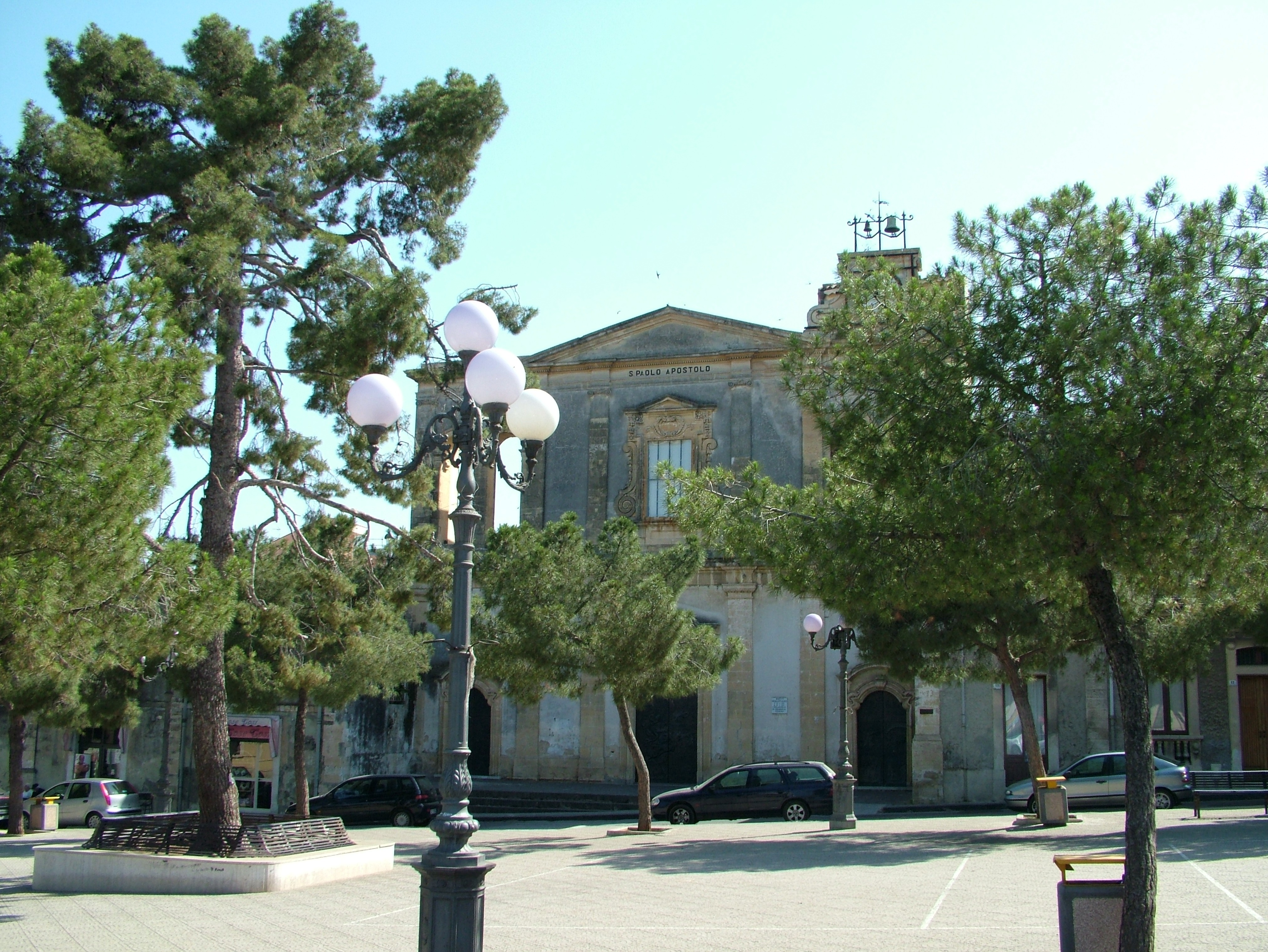

- Location within Italy Location within Sicily
- Coordinates: 37°6′N 15°7′E
- Country: Italy
- Region: Sicily
- Province: Province of Syracuse (SR)

Government
  - Mayor: Tiziano Spada

Area
  - Total: 13.01 km^{2} (5.02 sq mi)
- Elevation: 165 m (541 ft)

Population (Dec. 2006)
  - Total: 7,365
  - Density: 566.1/km^{2} (1,466/sq mi)
- Demonym: Solarinesi
- Time zone: UTC+1 (CET)
  - Summer (DST): UTC+2 (CEST)
- Postal code: 96010
- Dialing code: 0931
- Patron saint: Saint Paul
- Saint day: First Sunday of August
- Website: Official website

Solarino (Sicilian: San Paulu) is a comune (municipality) in the Province of Syracuse, Sicily (Italy). It is about 190 kilometres (120 mi) southeast of Palermo and about 15 kilometres (9 mi) west of Syracuse. As of 31 December 2006, it had a population of 7,365 and an area of 13.01 square kilometres (5.02 mi^{2}).

The father of Italian Australian Martial artist Sam Greco was born in Solarino, eventually settling in Melbourne, Australia.

Solarino borders the following municipalities: Floridia, Palazzolo Acreide, Priolo Gargallo, Syracuse, Sortino.

== Demographic evolution ==
Historical population

| Year | Pop. | ±% |
|---|---|---|
| 1861 | 2,408 | — |
| 1871 | 2,618 | +8.7% |
| 1881 | 2,895 | +10.6% |
| 1901 | 3,973 | +37.2% |
| 1911 | 4,456 | +12.2% |

| Year | Pop. | ±% |
|---|---|---|
| 1921 | 4,976 | +11.7% |
| 1931 | 4,944 | −0.6% |
| 1936 | 4,971 | +0.5% |
| 1951 | 5,807 | +16.8% |
| 1961 | 5,870 | +1.1% |

| Year | Pop. | ±% |
|---|---|---|
| 1971 | 5,901 | +0.5% |
| 1981 | 6,637 | +12.5% |
| 1991 | 7,252 | +9.3% |
| 2001 | 7,199 | −0.7% |

Source: Data from ISTAT

== Sister cities ==
- New Britain, (United States).
- Brunswick - Merri-bek, (Australia).

== Gallery ==
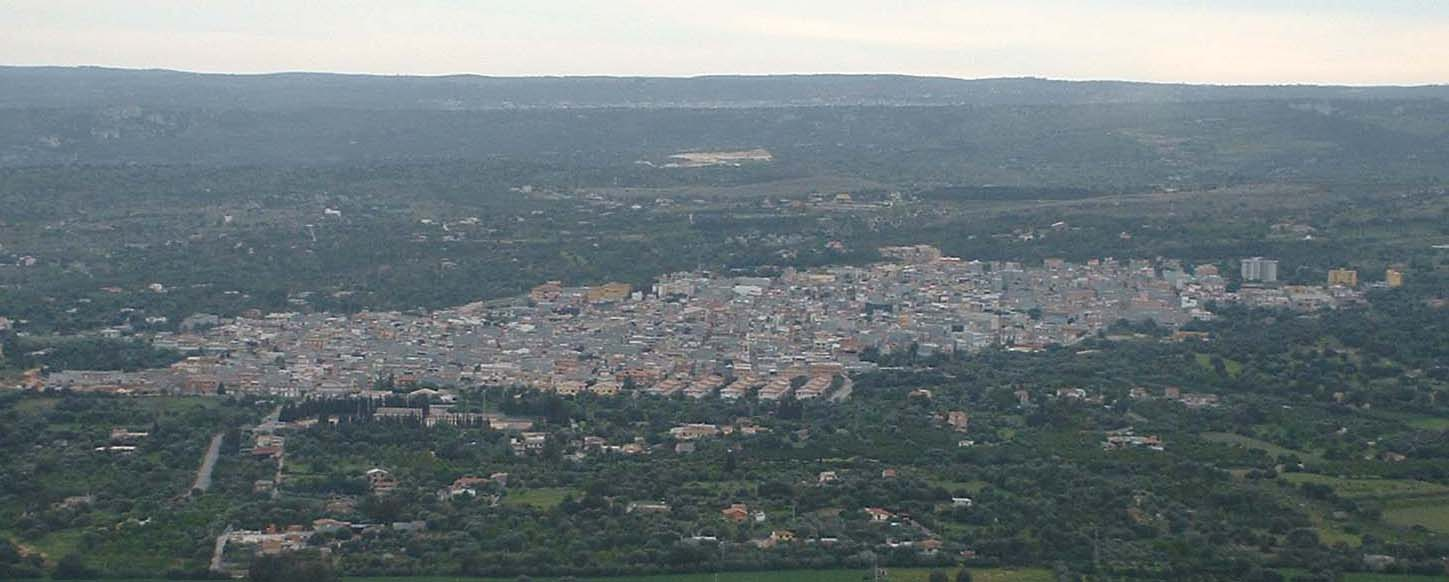
Panorama

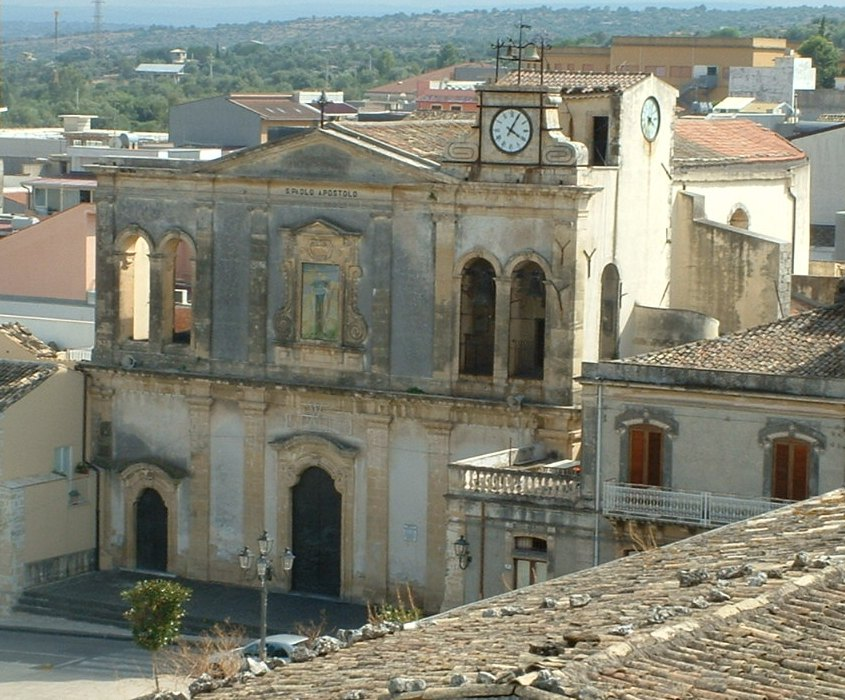
Church of St. Paul

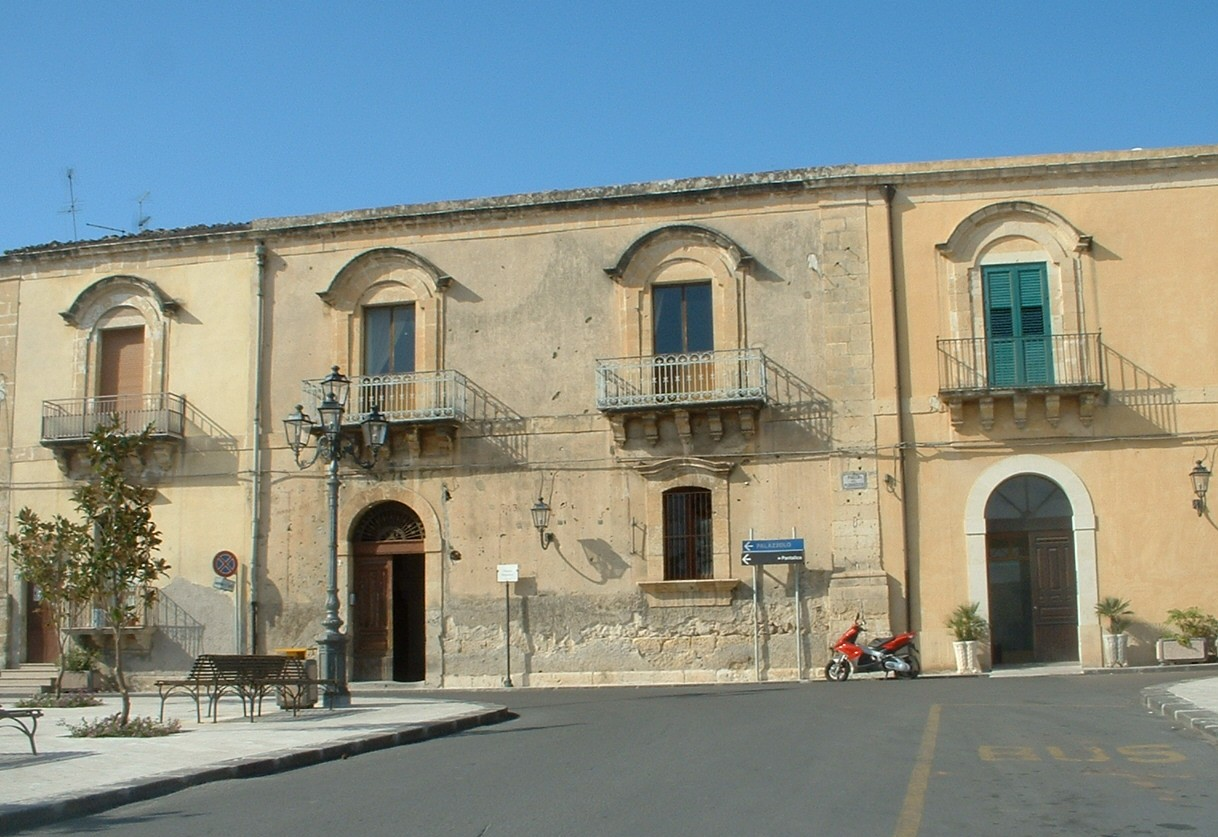
The Requisenz Palace

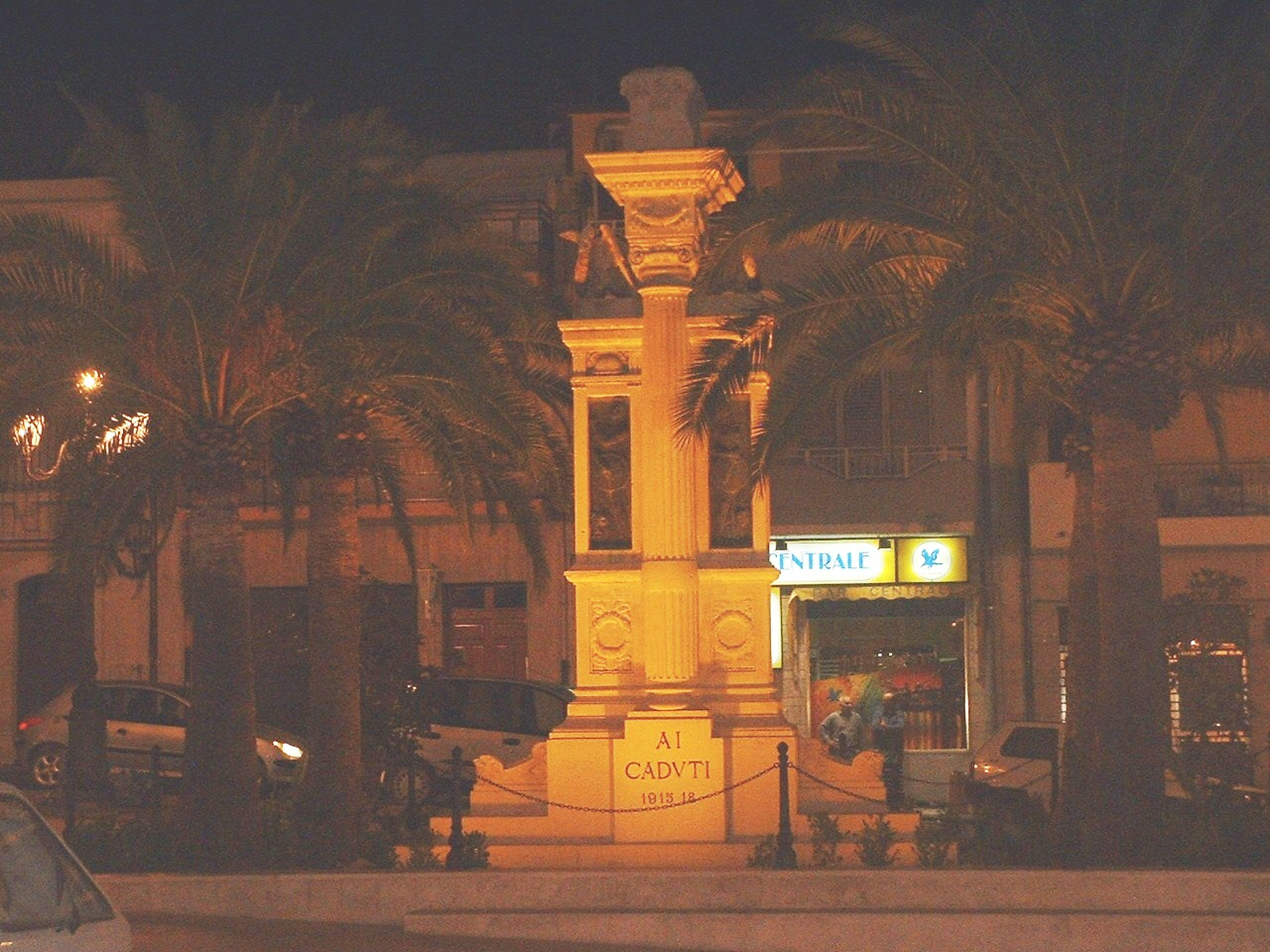
Monument to Fallen Italian Soldiers by night

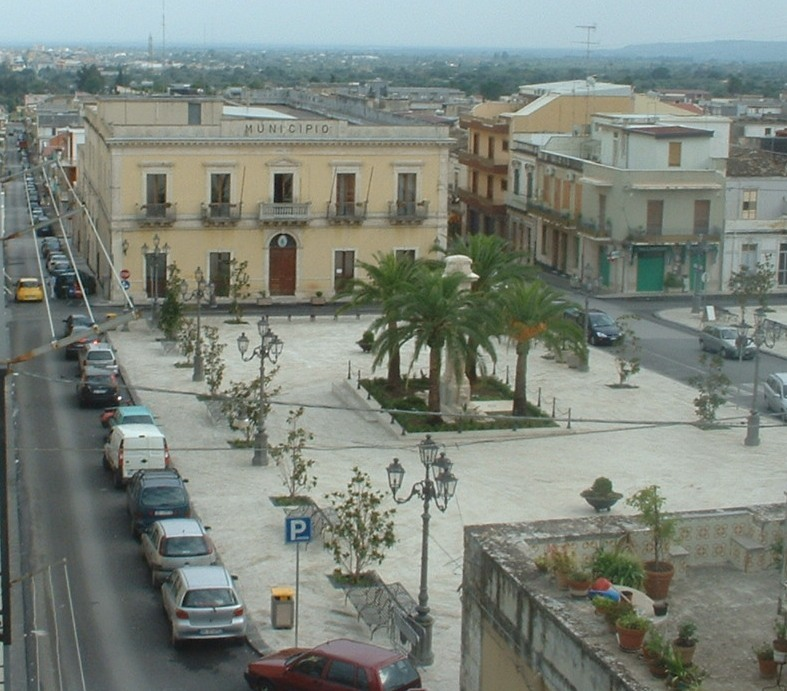
Plebiscito square

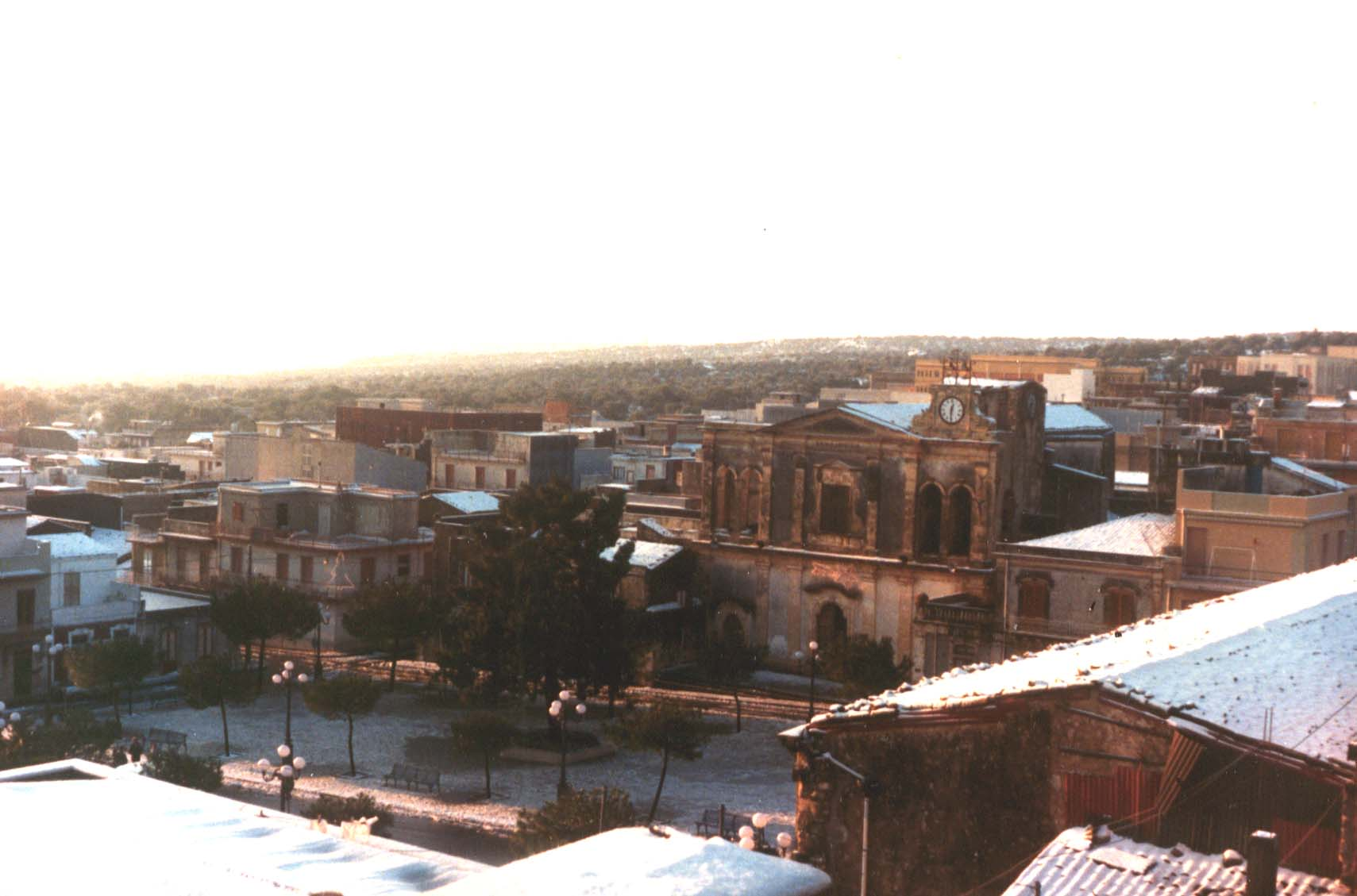
Plebiscito square in snow

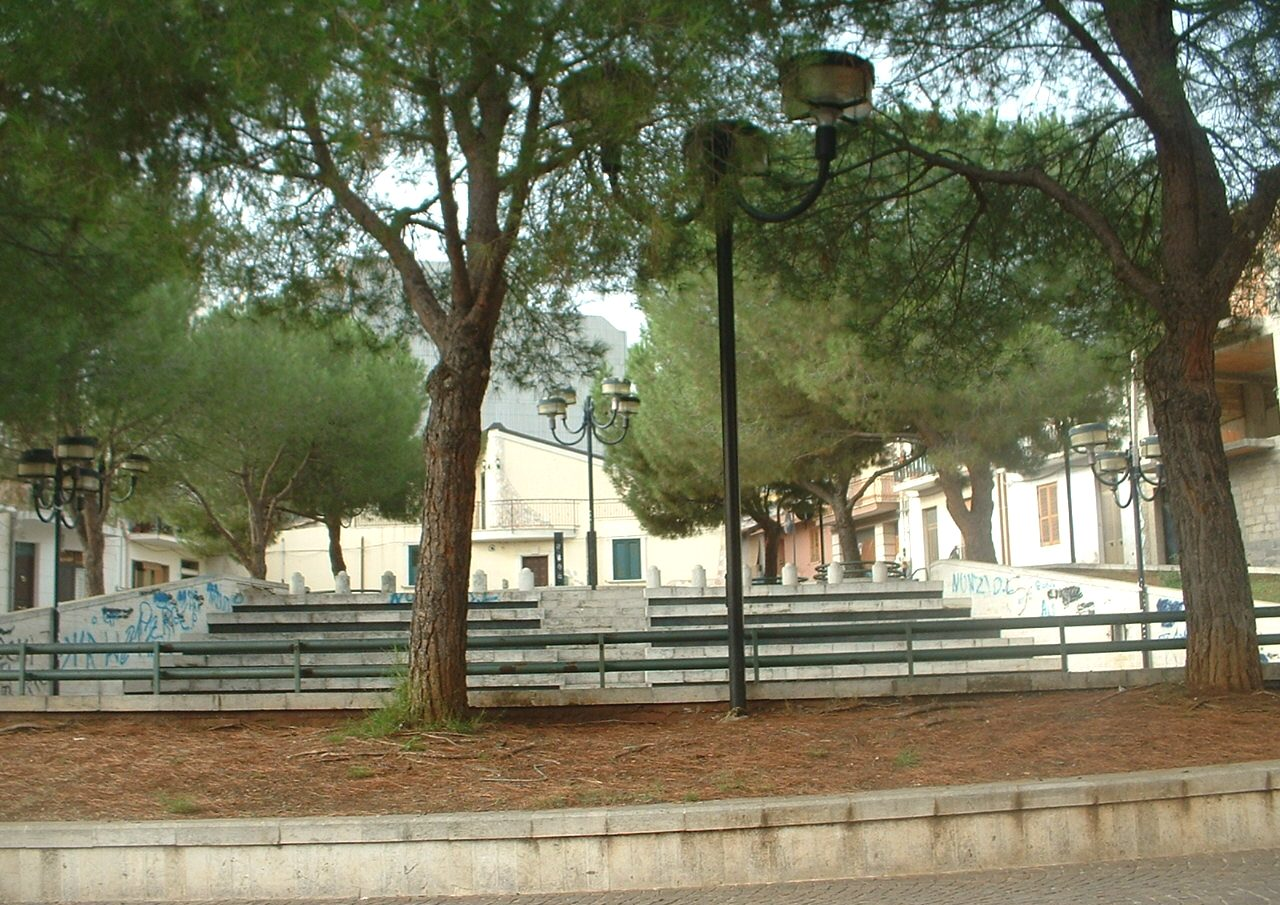
The IV November Square

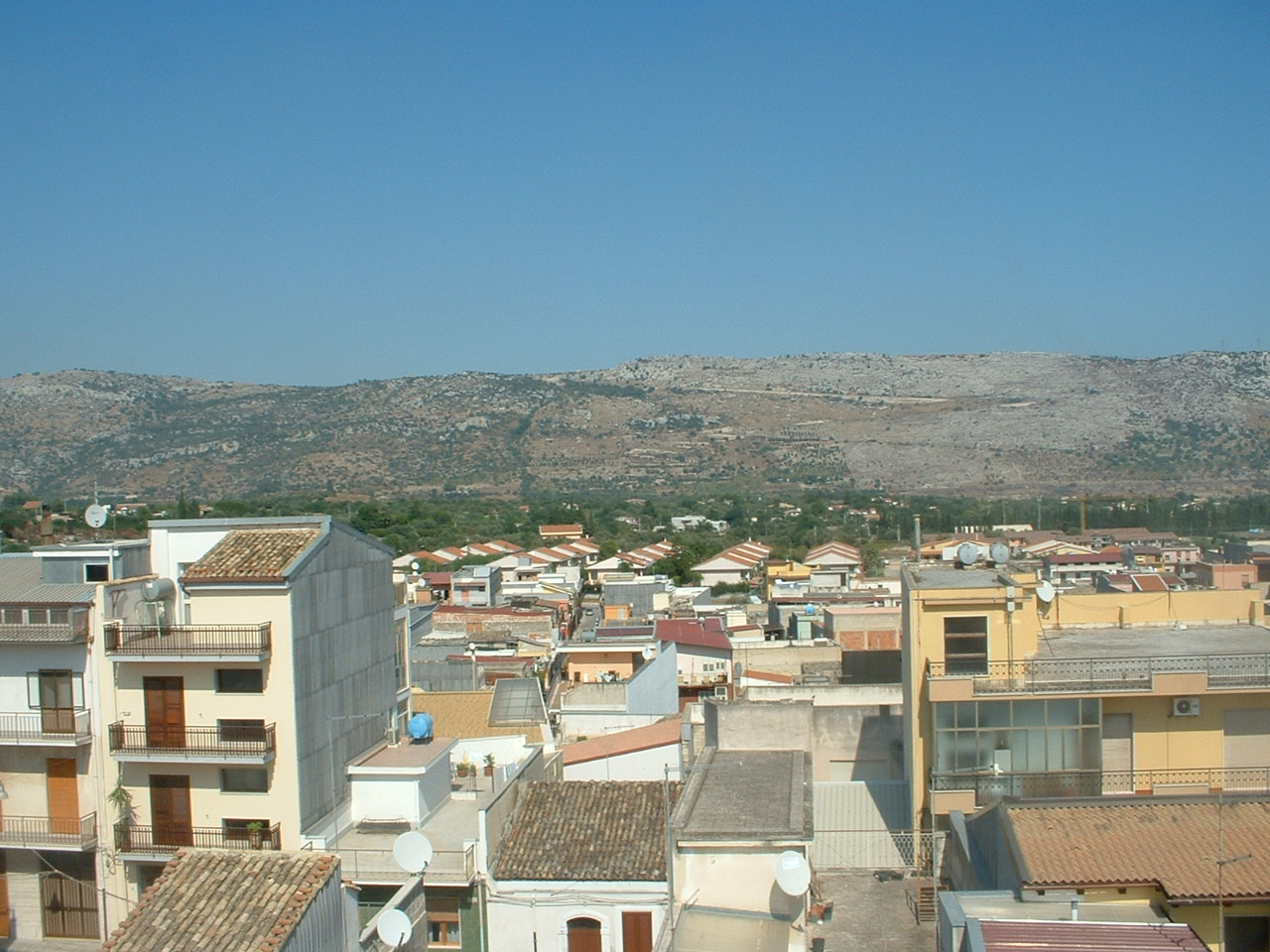
Solarino's north side and Climiti mountain

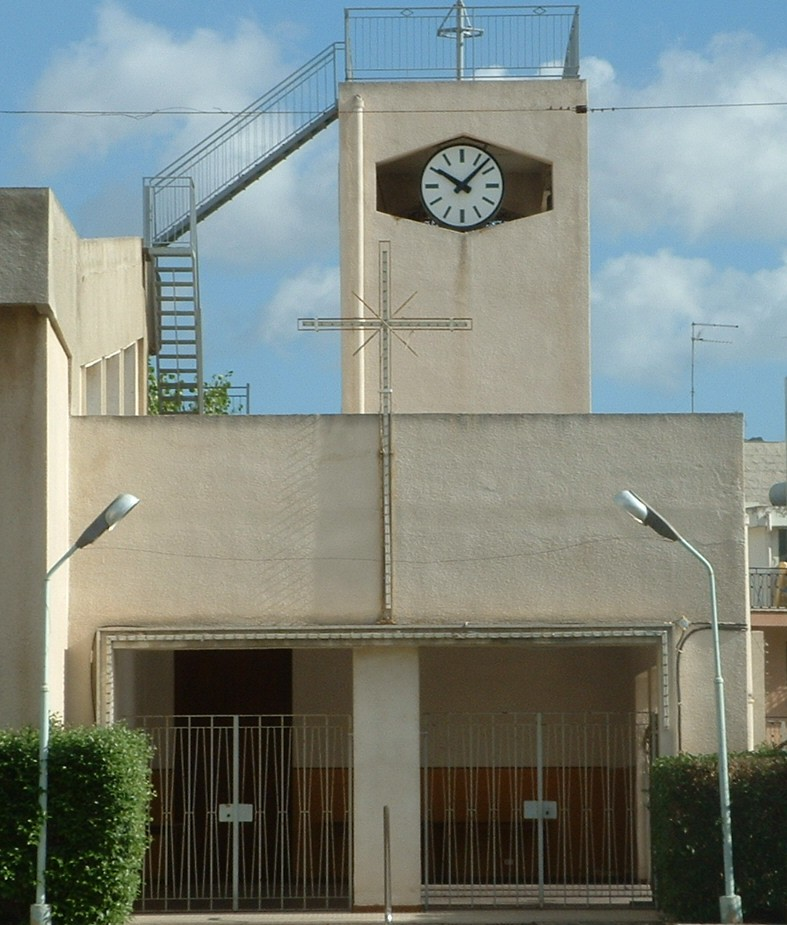
Church of "Madonna delle Lacrime"

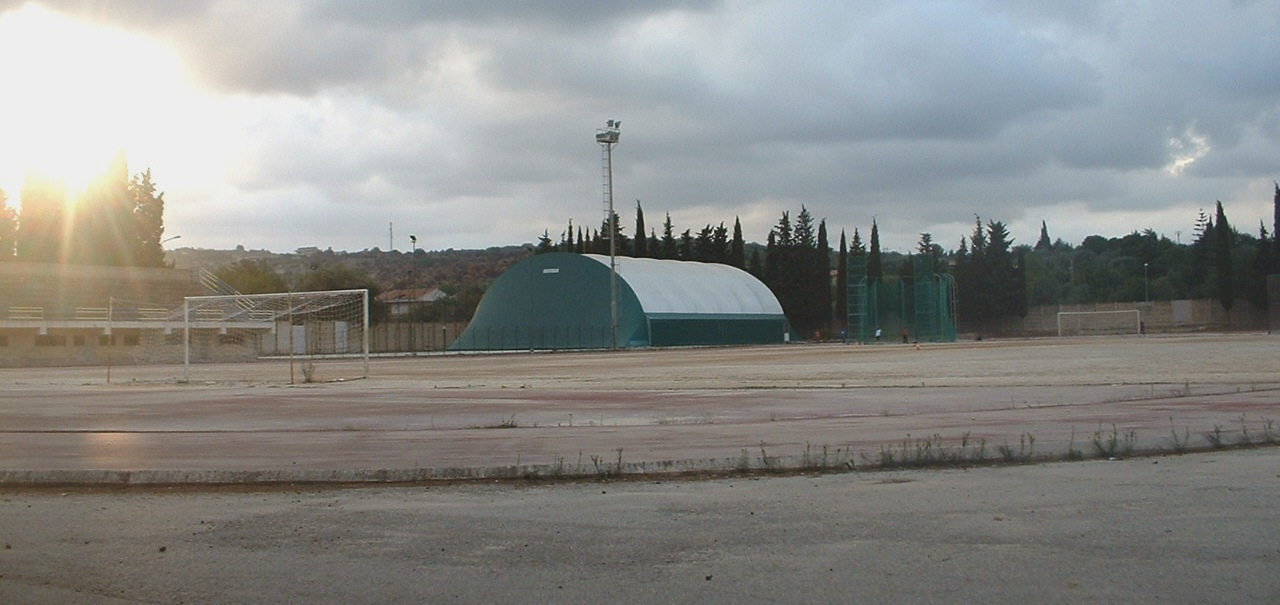
The "Pippo Scatà" Stadium

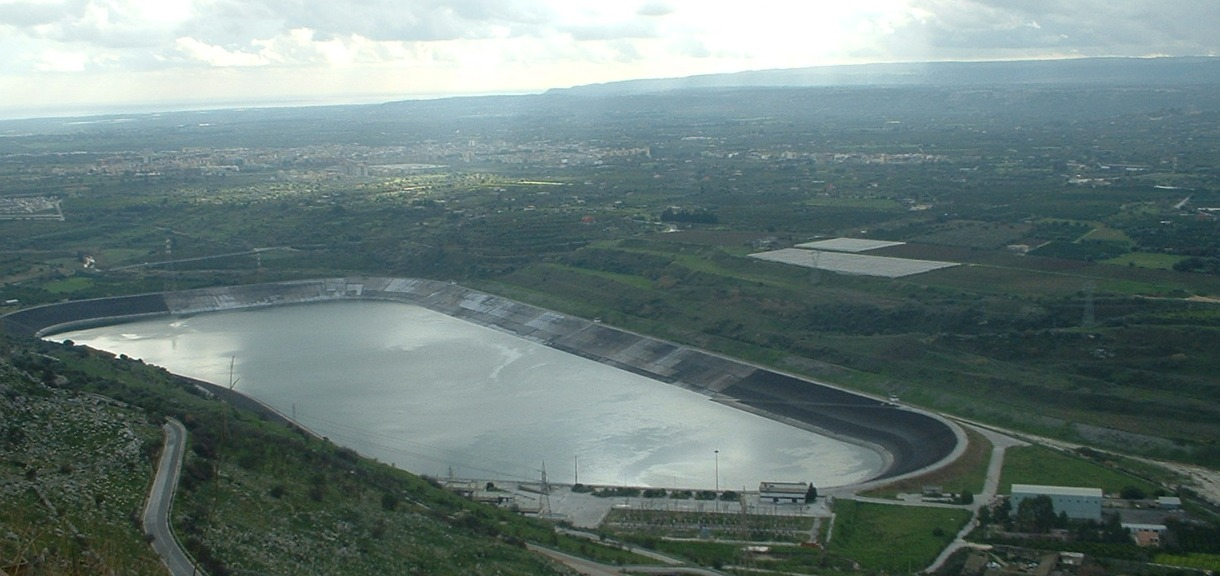
The hydroelectric station of Anapo river near Solarino
