= Ugo Buttà =

Italian military officer

- Born: 21 January 1891; Rome, Kingdom of Italy
- Died: 1 January 1949 (aged 57)
- Military career
- Allegiance: Kingdom of Italy
- Branch: Royal Italian Army
- Rank: Major General
- Commands: 4th Eritrean Battalions Group; 29th Infantry Regiment "Pisa"; Eastern Tripolitania Command; 213th Coastal Division; 58th Infantry Division "Legnano"
- Conflicts: World War I; First Battle of the Piave; Second Italo-Ethiopian War; First Battle of Tembien; World War II; Battle of the Western Alps; Greco-Italian War; North African campaign; Operation Achse
- Awards: Silver Medal of Military Valor; War Cross for Military Valor (twice); Military Order of Savoy; Order of the Crown of Italy; Colonial Order of the Star of Italy; Order of Saints Maurice and Lazarus

Ugo Buttà (Rome, 21 January 1891 – 1 January 1949) was an Italian general during World War II.

Buttà graduated from the Royal Military Academy of Infantry and Cavalry of Modena in 1912 and served in the First World War, earning a Silver Medal and War Cross for Military Valor. Buttà later served in the colonial troops in Somalia and Eritrea and worked as a secret agent in Khartoum. He participated in the Second Italo-Ethiopian War, earning a promotion to colonel and the Knight's Cross of the Military Order of Savoy. During World War II, Buttà took part in the Battle of the Western Alps and the Greco-Italian War, receiving another War Cross for Military Valor. He was promoted to brigadier general in 1941 and major general in 1943. After the proclamation of the armistice of Cassibile, Buttà's division refused to surrender to the Germans and evacuated most of their troops to Apulia.

== Biography ==
He was born in Rome on 21 January 1891, the son of Gaetano Buttà and Armida Ferrari. After enrolling at the Royal Military Academy of Infantry and Cavalry of Modena in 1908, he graduated with the rank of second lieutenant on 19 May 1912, entering service with the 2nd Bersaglieri Regiment in Rome. He participated in the First World War in the ranks of the 5th Bersaglieri Regiment, being promoted to lieutenant and later captain, and was awarded a Silver Medal and a War Cross for Military Valor for his conduct during the fighting on the Asiago plateau in late 1917 and early 1918. After the end of the war he served in the General Staff, later joining the Military Intelligence Service (SIM). He later served for a long time in the colonial troops in Somalia and Eritrea, being promoted to lieutenant colonel in 1927, and between July and October 1935 he worked in Khartoum as secret agent K.1, together with Captain Paolo Caccia Dominioni, gathering information on the British attitude and on the movements of British troops in view of the deteriorating diplomatic situation with Ethiopia, under the cover of a university professor, geologist and anthropologist, carrying out ethnographic research in the upper Nile.

He later took part in the Second Italo-Ethiopian War in command of the 4th Eritrean Battalions Group, part of the 2nd Eritrean Division, being promoted to colonel for war merit on 22 January 1936 (for his conduct during the First Battle of Tembien) and awarded the Knight's Cross of the Military Order of Savoy on 12 November 1936. He then commanded the 29th Infantry Regiment "Pisa", stationed in Asti, and later served at the command of the Royal Corps of Colonial Troops of Eritrea until 15 September 1939, when he became Chief of Staff of the 47th Infantry Division "Bari", with headquarters in Bari.

He remained in this post after the Kingdom of Italy entered World War II on 10 June 1940 and until the following December, participating in the Battle of the Western Alps and the Greco-Italian War (during which he was awarded another War Cross for Military Valor), after which he was promoted to brigadier general on 1 January 1941 and given command of the infantry of the 60th Infantry Division "Sabratha" after a period at the Albania General Headquarters. On 16 July 1941 he was assigned to the Armed Forces High Command of North Africa for special assignments, being made commander of Eastern Tripolitania. On 10 August 1942 he was given command of the 213th Coastal Division, stationed in eastern Sicily, but from 14 October he returned to the command of Eastern Tripolitania until 22 November, after which he was again attached to the Armed Forces High Command of North Africa until 31 March 1943. From 1 April that year he was assigned to the command of the 1st Army Corps in Turin for special assignments, before moving on to service at the Ministry of Italian Africa in Rome. From 25 April 1943 he assumed command of the 155th Infantry Division "Emilia", located in Montenegro, near the Boka Kotorska. On 1 July he was promoted to the rank of major general.

After the proclamation of the armistice of Cassibile on 8 September 1943, the troops of the division gathered around the Boka Kotorska, where together with the local Royal Italian Navy garrison they organized the defense of the local Naval Fortress Area, refusing to surrender to the Germans. Starting from September 14, the division gradually eliminated the smaller German garrisons that had remained isolated within its territory, except those of Kotor and Cruda, which resisted. On 16 September, in the face of intensifying German air and ground attacks and the lack of air support or reinforcements, General Buttà ordered the requisition of all vessels in Kotor (five steamers and a dozen smaller vessels) to carry his troops to Apulia. Two-thirds of the Division (6,500 men, including Buttà) were thus able to reach Allied-controlled southern Italy, while the rearguard was captured. On 1 October 1943 the "Emilia" Division was dissolved, and its troops were used to create the new units of the Italian Liberation Corps. Buttà died on 1 January 1949.
