= Floridia =

Floridia Ciurìddia (Sicilian)
- Comune
- Comune di Floridia
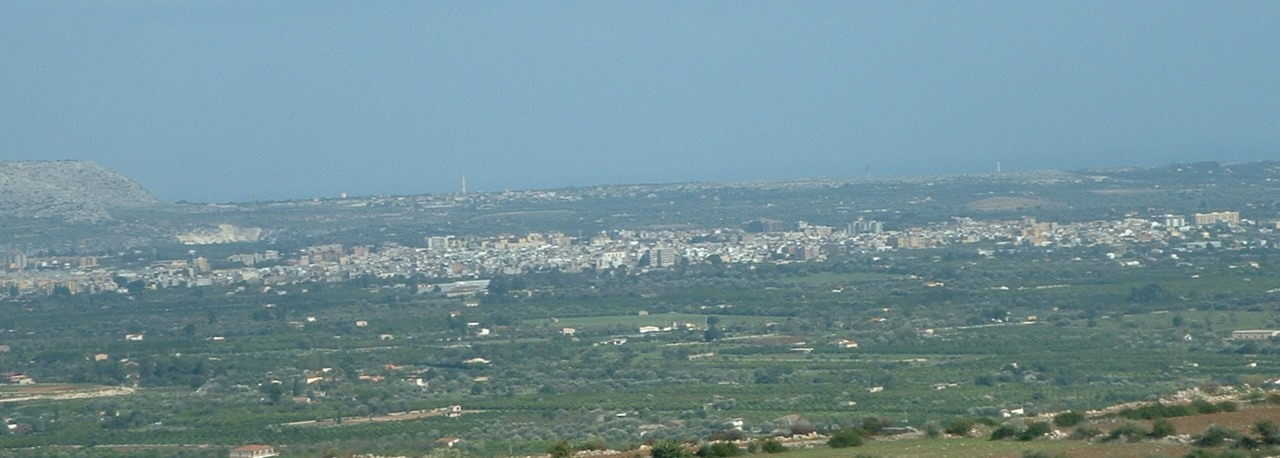

- Coat of arms

- Location within Italy Location within Sicily
- Coordinates: 37°05′N 15°09′E
- Country: Italy
- Region: Sicily
- Province: Syracuse (SR)

Government
  - Mayor: Marco Carianni

Area
  - Total: 26.22 km^{2} (10.12 sq mi)
- Elevation: 111 m (364 ft)

Population (December 31, 2005)
  - Total: 21,406
  - Density: 816.4/km^{2} (2,114/sq mi)
- Demonym: Floridiani
- Time zone: UTC+1 (CET)
  - Summer (DST): UTC+2 (CEST)
- Postal code: 96014
- Dialing code: 0931
- Patron saint: SS. Maria Immacolata
- Saint day: December 8
- Website: Official website

Floridia (Italian pronunciation: [floˈriːdja]; Sicilian: Çurìddia or Ciurìddia, pronounced [çʊˈɾidːja]; from Latin Florae dies 'day of Flora' or the adjective floridus 'florid') is an Italian town and comune (municipality) in the Province of Syracuse, Sicily.

== Geography ==
Floridia lies 12 kilometres (7.5 mi) west of Syracuse. Its principal industries are agriculture, livestock, and manufacturing.

Neighboring communities are Canicattini Bagni, Palazzolo Acreide, Syracuse, and Solarino.

== Climate ==
On 11 August 2021, Floridia broke the record for the highest recorded temperature in Europe at 48.8 °C (119.8 °F).

== History ==
Floridia was founded in 1628.

== Main sights ==
Floridia's streets are laid out in an even, rectangular grid pattern. The main landmarks are:

- San Bartolomeo Apostolo: mother church of town
- Sant'Antonio: church
- Santa Anna: church
- Chiesa del Carmine: church whose façade was greatly damaged by 1908 Messina earthquake, but has since been restored
- Chiesa della Madonna delle Grazie: church erected by the Spanish after their victory over the Austrians
- San Francesco: church
- Cava di Spampinato, a rock formation of crevices and caves that were created by erosion
- Casa di Ranieri, the home and religious site where many believers pray to the God of Rain each year

== Notable people born or raised in Floridia ==
Notable residents and historical figures include:

- Lucia Migliaccio (b. 1770 d. 1826) - Duchess of Floridia
