= AT-88 =

AT-88 may refer to:

- AT-88 semi-automatic pistol, a development of the Czech CZ-75, that had been developed in Switzerland by the ITM company who later went out of business
- USS Narragansett (AT-88), an American World War II Navajo-class fleet tug
