= Benvenuto Gioda =

Italian general (1886–1943)

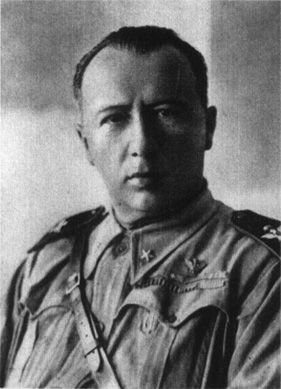
- Born: 16 February 1886; Turin, Kingdom of Italy
- Died: 25 February 1943; Bolzano, Kingdom of Italy
- Military career
- Allegiance: Kingdom of Italy
- Branch: Royal Italian Army
- Rank: Lieutenant General
- Commands: 24th Infantry Regiment "Como"; 8th Alpini Regiment; Military Academy of Modena; 4th Infantry Division Livorno; X Army Corps; XIX Army Corps
- Conflicts: Italo-Turkish War; Battle of Ain Zara; First Italo-Senussi War; World War I; Second Italo-Ethiopian War; World War II; Battle of the Western Alps; North African campaign; Operation Crusader; Battle of Gazala; Battle of Mersa Matruh; First Battle of El Alamein
- Awards: Silver Medal of Military Valor (twice); Bronze Medal of Military Valor; Military Order of Savoy

Benvenuto Gioda (16 February 1886 – 25 February 1943) was an Italian general during World War II.

== Biography ==
He was born in Turin on February 16, 1886, the son of Carlo Gioda and Carolina Sanchioli. After enlisting in the Royal Italian Army on November 3, 1904, he entered the Royal Military Academy of Modena as an officer cadet, graduating with the rank of second lieutenant in the Alpini Corps on September 14, 1906. With the rank of lieutenant and later of captain he took part in the Italian-Turkish war in Libya (participating in the battles of Ain Zara in December 1911 and of Sidi Said in June 1912), with the 3rd Alpini Regiment, being awarded a silver and bronze medal for military valor. He then participated in the First World War with the 5th Alpini Regiment, being promoted to major and then to lieutenant colonel; after the end of the war, in November 1919, he was assigned to the General Staff.

From 10 March 1922 to September 1923, he was a teacher at the Military School of Modena, and from 21 October 1923, he was transferred to the 4th Alpini Regiment. After promotion to colonel on 5 October 1928, he was given command of the 24th Infantry Regiment "Como" in 1930 and then of the 8th Alpini Regiment. On 4 January 1934, he was placed at the disposal of the Bologna Army Corps, and from 1 May 1934 to 1 August 1935 he was deputy commander of the Infantry Application School in Parma. He was then appointed deputy commander of the 5th CC.NN. Division "1 Febbraio", with which he left for Eritrea on November 3, 1935, participating in the conquest of Ethiopia, where he earned a second Silver Medal for Military Valor and the Knight's Cross of the Military Order of Savoy. On 1 January 1937, he was promoted to brigadier general for exceptional merits, and in the following July, he returned to Italy, becoming commander of the Royal Military Academy of Modena from 23 September 1937 to 15 December 1939. He was promoted to major general on June 30, 1939, and from 1 January 1940, he assumed command of the 4th Infantry Division Livorno, which after Italy’s entrance into World War II on 10 June of the same year, fought against French troops on the western Alpine front.

From 1 November 1941, after having left the command of the "Livorno" Division to General Domenico Chirieleison, he was assigned to the High Command of the Italian Armed Forces in North Africa, and on 12 December he assumed the Command of the X Army Corps, participating in Operation Crusader, the battle of Gazala, the battle of Mersa Matruh and the First Battle of El Alamein. On 16 August 1942, after some disagreements with German general Erwin Rommel, he left the command of the X Corps (being replaced by General Federico Ferrari Orsi) and was attached to Delease for special assignments until 5 September 1942, when he was repatriated.

He was then assigned to the headquarters of the newly established XIX Army Corps (stationed in South Tyrol), located in Bolzano, becoming its commander on the following 29 October, after promotion to lieutenant general. He suddenly died in Bolzano on 25 February 1943, at the age of 57.
