= 4th Infantry Division "Livorno" =

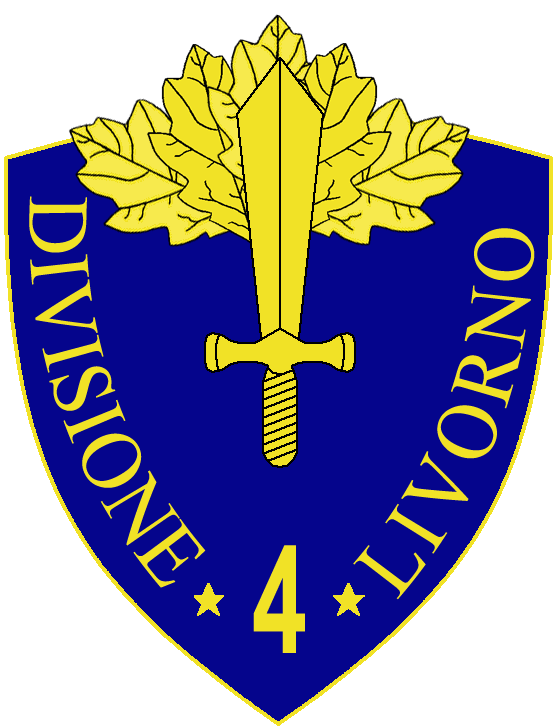
- 4th Infantry Division "Livorno" insignia
- Active: 1939 - 1943
- Country: Kingdom of Italy
- Branch: Royal Italian Army
- Type: Infantry
- Size: Division
- Garrison/HQ: Cuneo
- Engagements: World War II: France; Sicily; Gela

Commanders
- Notable commanders: General Domenico Chirieleison

Insignia
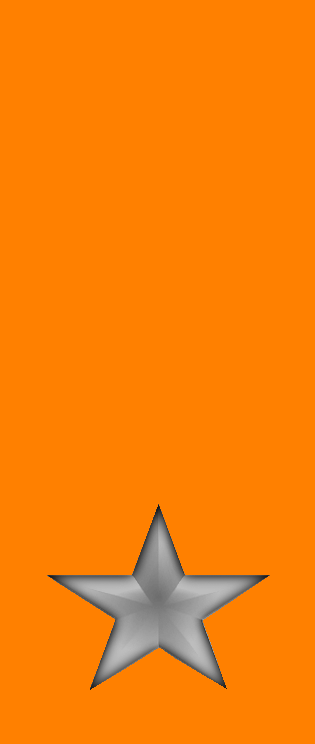
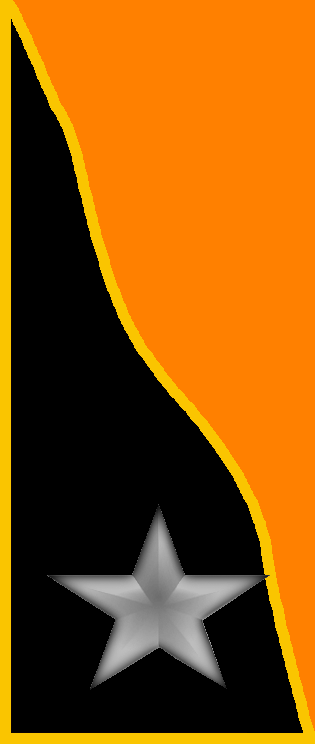
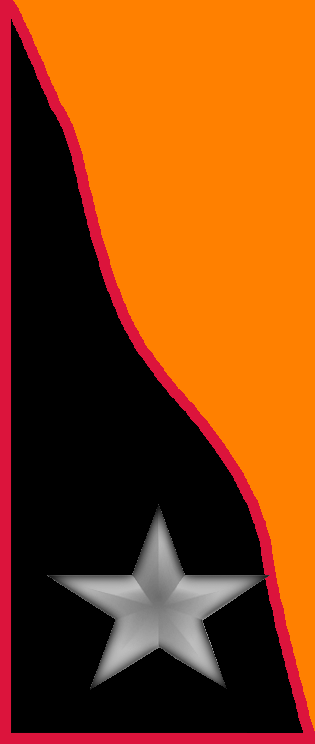
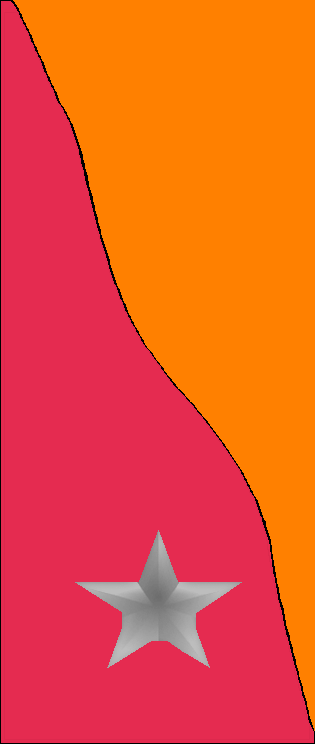
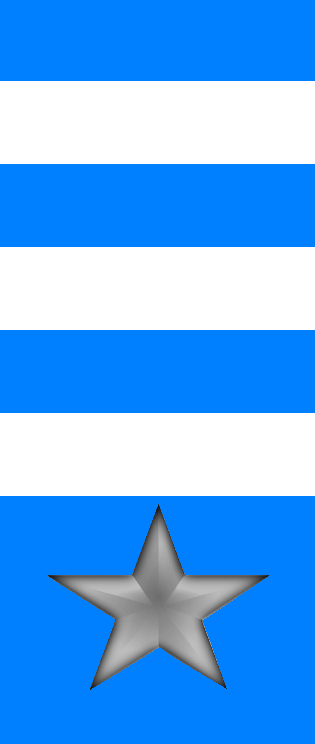
- Identification symbol: Livorno Division gorget patches

The 4th Infantry Division "Livorno" (Italian: 4ª Divisione di fanteria "Livorno") was an infantry division of the Royal Italian Army during World War II. The Livorno was a mountain-type infantry division, which meant that the division's artillery and logistics were moved by pack mules, while in standard infantry divisions artillery and logistics were moved by horse-drawn limbers and carriages. Italy's real mountain warfare divisions were the six alpine divisions manned by Alpini troops. The Livorno was formed on 5 April 1939 in Cuneo and named for the city of Livorno.

== History ==
The division's lineage begins with the Brigade "Livorno" established by order of the Provisional Government of the Grand Duchy of Tuscany on 4 November 1859 with the 5th and 6th infantry regiments. On 25 March 1860 the Brigade "Livorno" entered the Royal Sardinian Army three days after the Kingdom of Sardinia had annexed the United Provinces of Central Italy, which included the Grand Duchy of Tuscany. Already before entering the Royal Sardinian Army the brigade's two infantry regiments had been renumbered on 30 December 1859 as 33rd Infantry Regiment and 34th Infantry Regiment.

=== World War I ===
The brigade fought on the Italian front in World War I. On 1 October 1926 the brigade assumed the name of IV Infantry Brigade and received the 38th Infantry Regiment "Ravenna" from the disbanded Brigade "Ravenna". The brigade was the infantry component of the 4th Territorial Division of Cuneo, which also included the 28th Field Artillery Regiment.

In 1930 the division exchanged the 38th Infantry Regiment "Ravenna" for the 44th Infantry Regiment "Forlì" with the 3rd Territorial Division of Alessandria. In 1934 the division changed its name to 4th Infantry Division "Monviso". During the Second Italo-Ethiopian War the division's 34th Infantry Regiment "Livorno" was sent to garrison Leros in the Italian Islands of the Aegean. The regiment departed on 3 September 1935 and returned on 14 September 1936.

On 31 March 1939 the division ceded the 44th Infantry Regiment "Forlì" to the newly activated 36th Infantry Division "Forlì" and on 5 April of the same year the IV Infantry Brigade was dissolved and the two remaining infantry regiments came under direct command of the division, which changed its name to 4th Infantry Division "Livorno".

=== World War II ===
At the beginning of June 1940, the Livorno division was deployed for the Italian invasion of France at the border with France, south-west of Vinadio, concentrating at Pas de Saint-Anne and Lausfer pass. Rear echelons stretched back to Bagni di Vinadio. The division started operations on 13 June 1940 by shelling across the border. The actual advance started 15 June 1940 with the capture of Collalunga pass at altitude 2608 m. There was intermittent fighting mostly in the form of artillery barrages until 23 June 1940, when fierce fighting erupted. After a day-long assault, the Italian forces were able to break the French defenses and reached Saint-Honorat in La Bollène-Vésubie commune. Afterward, the advance stalled and not much progress was made until the armistice of 25 June 1940.

In April 1942 the Livorno began to reorganize as an auto-transportable division of the North-African type for the planned invasion of Malta scheduled for summer of that year. However due to the deteriorating situation in the North African theater the division was reformed as a motorized unit and earmarked for the Tunisian campaign. Once the transfer to Tunisia got underway the division was rerouted to Sicily as the situation in Tunisia worsened. In Sicily the division initially deployed in the area of Caltanissetta, San Cataldo, Aragona, Raffadali, and Serradifalco as the 6th Army's mobile reserve.

==== Sicily ====
The Livorno was the only Italian mobile division in Sicily as it had sufficient transport to move all of its infantry units simultaneously. Located in southern Sicily at the start of the Allied landings on 10 July 1943, the division carried out a substantial counterattack on 10–11 July 1943 that almost succeed to throw the allies back into the sea, being stopped just a few hundred meters from the beaches. On 10 July Livorno's infantry supported by the 155th Bersaglieri Motorcyclists Company and a column of tanks poured onto Highways 115 and 117 and nearly retook the city of Gela, but guns from the destroyer Shubrick and the light cruiser Boise destroyed several Fiat 3000 tanks. Also, Allied forces had attacked the division's right flank from Licata towards the direction of Ravanusa and Riesi, tying up many of the Italian troops. The Battle of Gela was reported by an American newspaper: "Supported by no less than forty-five tanks, a considerable force of infantry of the Livorno Division attacked the American troops around Gela. The American division beat them back with severe casualties. This was the heaviest response to the Allied advance." The Livorno regrouped and made a further attempt to retake Gela two days later and the III Battalion, 34th Infantry Regiment "Livorno", is recorded by its commanding officer to have made a valiant effort in the Gela Beachhead, but on 15 July 1943, the Allied armored units that attacked from west between Valguarnera Caropepe and Raddusa threatened to encircle the Livorno. Raddusa was lost by the Italians on 18 July 1943 after heavy fighting, and the Livorno took a stand at the Simeto river south of Catania. On 22 July 1943 the Livorno division was subject to heavy coastal bombardment by British ships between Leonforte and the mouth of the Simeto, but managed to hold its position.

Failures of other Axis units in Sicily then forced the Livorno to retreat. The retreat route passed through Agira and Regalbuto, where the division suffered severe losses. The remnants of Livorno were sent to Castroreale to reorganize on 30 July 1943, but because of a complete absence of supplies, the decision was made to evacuate the remnants of the division to the mainland Italy. On 1 August 1943, the Livorno division reached Messina. From 1-14 August 1943 the Livorno was ferried to Calabria, suffering further losses in the process. Only 4,200 troops out of an initial strength of 13,000 could be saved. In early September 1943, the Livorno returned to Piedmont to be reformed. After the announcement of the Armistice of Cassibile on 8 September 1943 the division was disbanded by the invading German forces on 9 September 1943, while all of its personnel was on leave.

== Organization ==
4th Infantry Division "Livorno" organization in 1940

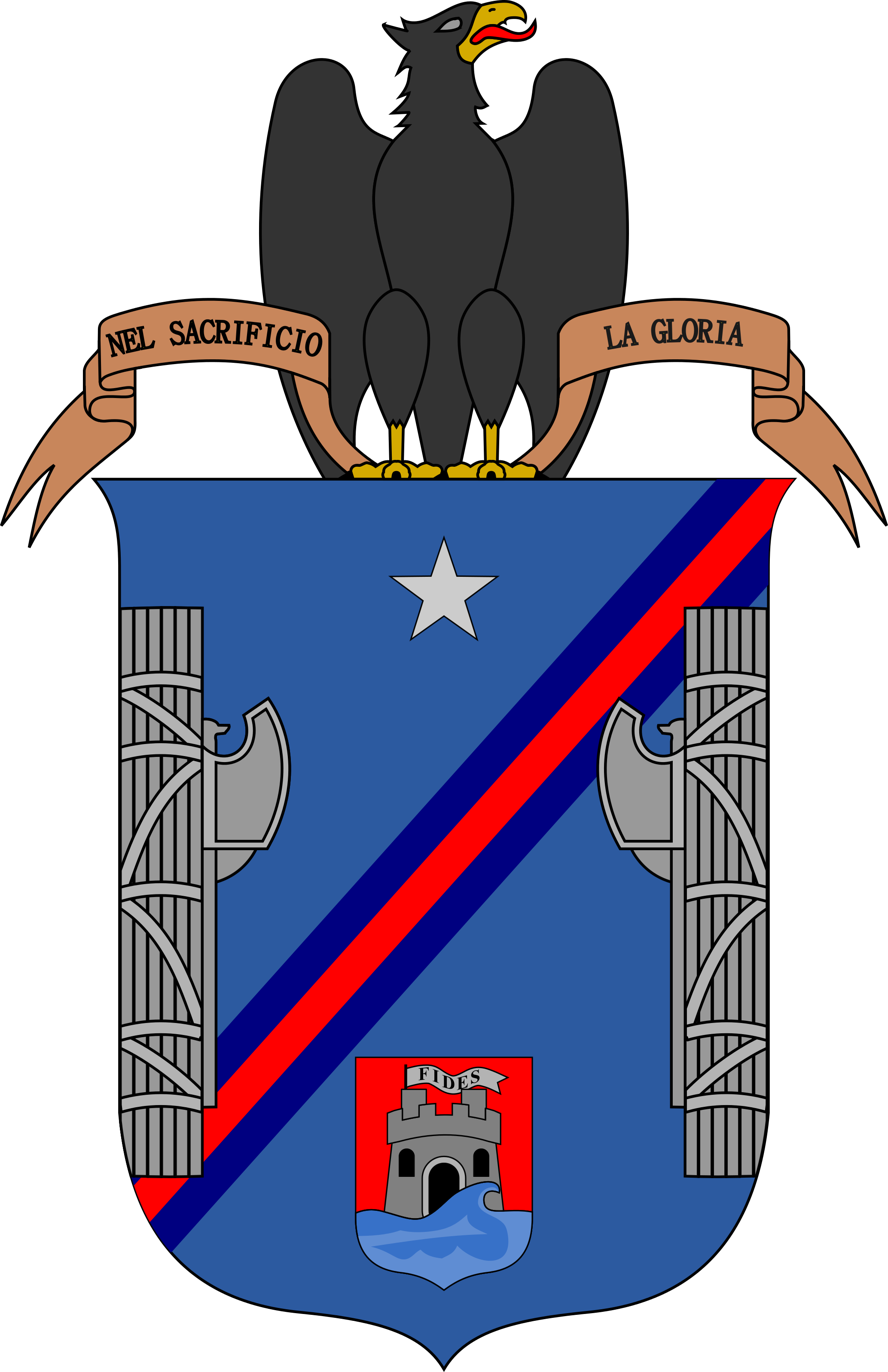
Coat of Arms of the 33rd Infantry Regiment "Livorno", 1939

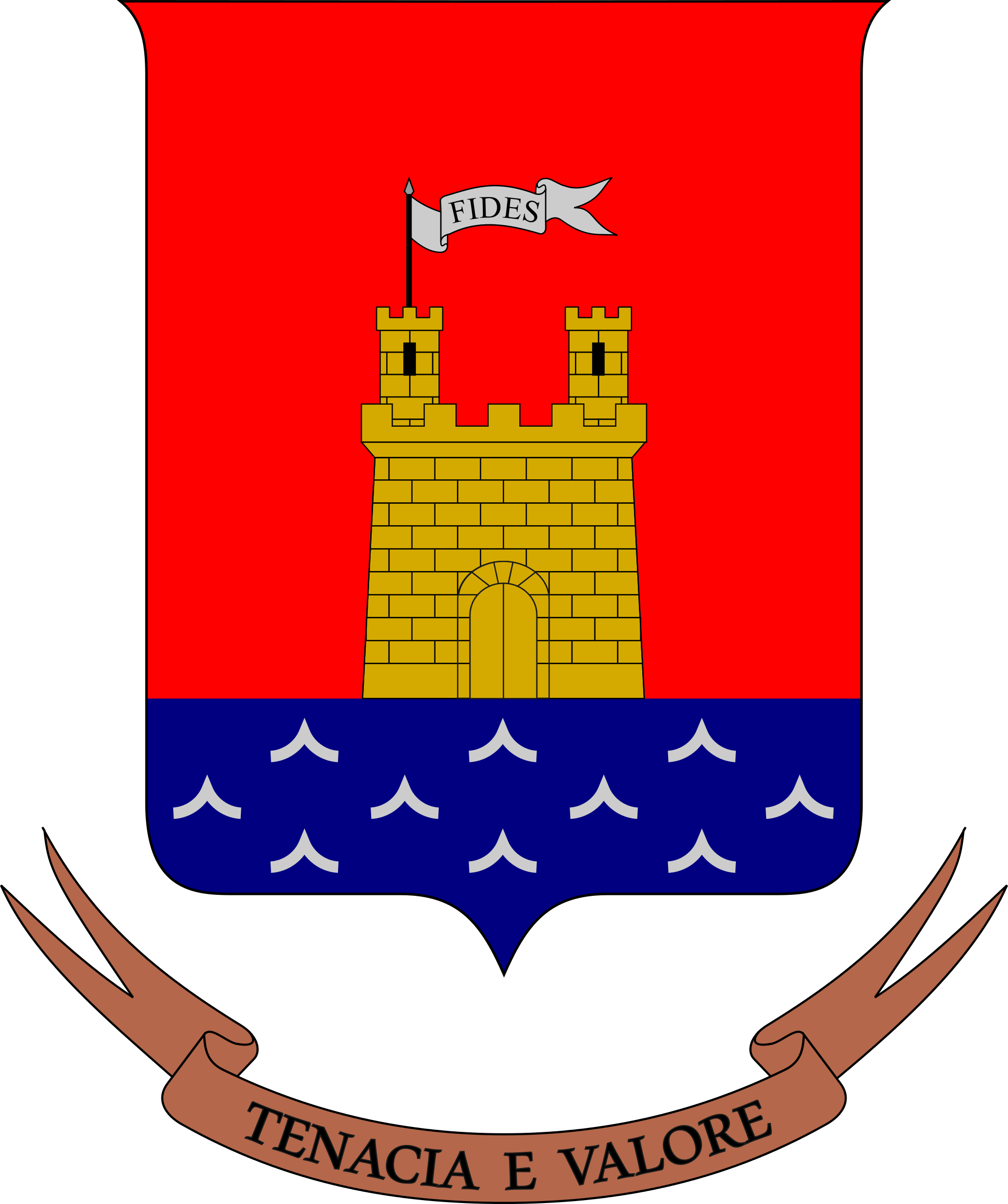
Coat of Arms of the 34th Infantry Regiment "Livorno", 1939

The 4th Infantry Division "Livorno" had its recruiting area in southern Piedmont and was headquartered in Cuneo. Its two infantry regiments were based in Cuneo (33rd) and Fossano (34th), with the division's artillery regiment also based in Cuneo.

- 4th Infantry Division "Livorno", in Cuneo
  - Headquarters
    - Command Company
    - 10th Carabinieri Section
    - 11th Carabinieri Section
    - 77th Field Post Office
    - 4th Infantry Division Command Transport Squad
  - 33rd Infantry Regiment "Livorno", in Cuneo
    - Command Company
    - 3 × Fusilier battalions
    - Support Weapons Battery (65/17 mod. 13 infantry support guns)
    - Mortar Company (81mm mod. 35 mortars)
  - 34th Infantry Regiment "Livorno", in Fossano
    - Command Company
    - 3 × Fusilier battalions
    - Support Weapons Battery (65/17 mod. 13 infantry support guns)
    - Mortar Company (81mm mod. 35 mortars)
  - 28th Artillery Regiment "Livorno", in Fossano
    - Command Unit
    - I Group (100/17 mod. 14 howitzers)
    - II Group (75/13 mod. 15 mountain guns; re-equipped in November 1940 with 100/17 mod. 14 howitzers)
    - III Group (75/13 mod. 15 mountain guns; re-equipped in November 1940 with 75/27 mod. 06 field guns)
    - 1 × Anti-aircraft batteries (20/65 mod. 35 anti-aircraft guns)
    - Ammunition and Supply Unit
  - 28th Artillery Regiment "Livorno", in Fossano (after being reorganized as motorized regiment on 15 April 1942)
    - Command Unit
    - I Group (100/17 mod. 14 howitzers)
    - II Group (100/17 mod. 14 howitzers; joined the regiment in 1943)
    - II Group (75/13 mod. 15 mountain guns; re-equipped in November 1940 with 100/17 mod. 14 howitzers; transferred on 15 April 1942 to the 157th Artillery Regiment "Novara")
    - III Group (75/13 mod. 15 mountain guns; re-equipped in November 1940 with 75/27 mod. 06 field guns; transferred on 15 April 1942 to the 157th Artillery Regiment "Novara")
    - II Group (75/18 mod. 35 howitzers; joined the regiment in April 1942; renumbered III Group in 1943)
    - III Group (75/18 mod. 35 howitzers; joined the regiment in April 1942; renumbered IV Group in 1943)
    - DLIV Self-propelled Group (Semovente da 75/18 self-propelled guns; attached to the regiment from 19 May to 15 July 1942)
    - 3 × Anti-aircraft batteries (20/65 mod. 35 anti-aircraft guns)
    - Ammunition and Supply Unit
  - IV Self-propelled Anti-tank Battalion (Semovente da 47/32 self-propelled guns; joined the division in 1942)
  - IV Mortar Battalion (81mm mod. 35 mortars)
  - LVII Mixed Engineer Battalion (formed in 1942)
  - 4th Anti-tank Company (47/32 mod. 35 anti-tank guns)
  - 18th Anti-tank Company, 18th Infantry Division "Messina" (47/32 mod. 35 anti-tank guns; attached July 1941)
  - 4th Telegraph and Radio Operators Company (entered the LVII Mixed Engineer Battalion in 1942)
  - 20th Engineer Company (entered the LVII Mixed Engineer Battalion in 1942)
  - 12th Medical Section (replaced in 1942 by the 68th Medical Section)
    - 4 × Field hospitals
    - 13th Surgical Unit
  - 68th Medical Section
    - 20th Field Hospital
    - 22nd Field Hospital
    - 63rd Field Hospital
    - 122nd Field Hospital
    - 1 × Surgical Unit
  - 4th Autocarrette Section (disbanded in 1942)
  - 8th Supply Section
  - 129th Transport Section

Attached during the invasion of France in 1940:

- XCV CC.NN. Battalion

Attached from 10 February to 18 August 1941:

- 195th CC.NN. Legion "Giovanni delle Bande Nere"
  - Command Company
  - LXXI CC.NN. Battalion
  - LXXXI CC.NN. Battalion
  - 195th CC.NN. Machine Gun Company

== Commanding officers ==
The division's commanding officers were:

No.	Portrait	Commander	Took office	Left office	Time in office
1	Antero Leonardo Canale	Generale di Divisione; Antero Leonardo Canale (1879–1959)	1936	14 December 1939	3 years, 347 days
2	Benvenuto Gioda	Generale di Divisione; Benvenuto Gioda (1886–1943)	15 December 1939	31 May 1943	3 years, 167 days
3	Domenico Chirieleison	Generale di Divisione; Domenico Chirieleison (1888–1972)	1 June 1943	August 1943	61 days
4	Vincenzo Robertiello	Generale di Brigata; Vincenzo Robertiello (born 1888)	August 1943	9 September 1943	39 days
