= Domenico Chirieleison =

Italian general

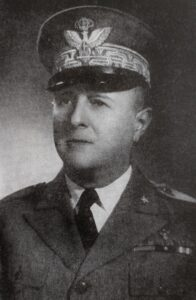
- Born: 26 December 1888; Asti, Kingdom of Italy
- Died: 1972 (aged 84); Rome, Italy
- Military career
- Allegiance: Kingdom of Italy
- Branch: Royal Italian Army
- Rank: Major General
- Commands: 9th Artillery Regiment "Brennero"; 4th Infantry Division Livorno
- Conflicts: World War I; Battles of the Isonzo; World War II; Operation Compass; Allied invasion of Sicily; Battle of Gela
- Awards: Silver Medal of Military Valor; Bronze Medal of Military Valor; War Merit Cross; Military Order of Savoy; Military Order of Italy; Order of Saints Maurice and Lazarus; Order of the Crown of Italy

Domenico Chirieleison (Asti, 26 December 1888 – Rome, 1972) was an Italian general during World War II.

== Biography ==
He was born in Asti on December 26, 1888, from a family hailing from Messina. He enlisted in the Royal Italian Army in 1905, and attended the Royal Military Academy of Artillery and Engineers in Turin, graduating on 19 September 1909 with the rank of artillery second lieutenant, assigned to the 27th Field Artillery Regiment. He participated in the First World War with the 3rd Field Artillery Regiment, rising in rank from lieutenant to major, and being awarded a Bronze Medal of Military Valor and a War Merit Cross.

He was promoted to lieutenant colonel and then colonel on 1 November 1934, receiving command of the 9th Artillery Regiment "Brennero" and then, from 1 October 1937, becoming Chief of Staff of the Turin Army Corps. Having become a brigadier general in June 1939, he was attached to the Naples Army Corps from August to October 1939; after the outbreak of World War II he served at the headquarters of the 10th Army in Libya, as deputy chief of staff, participating in the campaign that resulted in the destruction of the Army in February 1941. On 1 January 1942 he was promoted to the rank of major general.

On 1 November 1941 he was appointed commander of the 4th Infantry Division Livorno, replacing General Benvenuto Gioda. In 1942 the division was transferred from Piedmont to central Italy, where it underwent intensive training as one of the units chosen for the planned landing in Malta; it was later transferred to Sicily, where it was considered to be the best Italian unit at the time of the Allied landings in July 1943. The Division participated in the battle of Gela, launching heavy counterattacks against US troops on 11 July 1943, the day after the landings, being repelled with the help of naval gunfire. In the subsequent bitter fighting over 7,000 of the 11,000 men who made up the division were killed or wounded; in August 1943 the remnants of the Division were withdrawn to mainland Italy and sent to Cuneo for reorganization. For his role in the Sicilian campaign he was awarded a Silver Medal of Military Valor and the Officer's Cross of the Military Order of Italy.

At the time of the Armistice of Cassibile Chirieleison was in Rome; he joined the Italian Social Republic, and from January 1944 he was appointed Commissioner for the central administration of the open city of Rome. From 31 December 1943 he also assumed the post of Secretary General of the National Republican Army, replacing General Emilio Canevari. At the same time, he actively collaborated with the National Liberation Committee and with the Allies; after the liberation of Rome (June 1944) he returned to the ranks of the Royal Italian Army.

As commander of the open city of Rome in 1943–1944, in 1948 he was heard as a witness in the trial of Herbert Kappler.

He died in Rome in 1972.
