= 5th CC.NN. Division "1 Febbraio" =

- 5ª Divisione CC.NN. "1 Febbraio"
- Active: 15 July 1935 – 15 September 1936
- Country: Kingdom of Italy
- Branch: Blackshirts
- Size: Division
- Patron: Founding date of the Milizia Volontaria per la Sicurezza Nazionale
- Engagements: Second Italo-Ethiopian War

The 5th CC.NN. Division "1 Febbraio" (Italian: 5ª Divisione CC.NN. "1 Febbraio") was an Italian CC.NN. (Blackshirts militia) division raised on 15 July 1935 for the Second Italo-Ethiopian War against Ethiopia and disbanded shortly after the war. The name "1 Febbraio" was chosen to commemorate the founding of the Milizia Volontaria per la Sicurezza Nazionale on 1 February 1923.

== Organization ==
Below follows the division's organization during the Second Italo-Ethiopian War and the cities, in which its CC.NN. battalions and companies/batteries were raised.

- 5th CC.NN. Division "1 Febbraio"
  - 107th CC.NN. Legion "Cairoli", in Pavia
    - Command Company
    - CVII CC.NN. Battalion, in Pavia
    - CLXXXVI CC.NN. Battalion, in Lucca
    - 107th CC.NN. Machine Gun Company, in Pavia
    - 107th CC.NN. Artillery Battery, in Pavia (65/17 infantry support guns)
  - 128th CC.NN. Legion "Randaccio", in Vercelli
    - Command Company
    - CXXVIII CC.NN. Battalion, in Vercelli
    - CXXIX CC.NN. Battalion, in Arona
    - 128th CC.NN. Machine Gun Company, in Vercelli
    - 128th CC.NN. Artillery Battery, in Vercelli (65/17 infantry support guns)
  - 142nd CC.NN. Legion "Berica", in Vicenza
    - Command Company
    - CXLII CC.NN. Battalion, in Vicenza
    - CCXLII CC.NN. Battalion, in Vicenza
    - 142nd CC.NN. Machine Gun Company, in Vicenza
    - 142nd CC.NN. Artillery Battery, in Vicenza (65/17 infantry support guns)
  - V CC.NN. Machine Gun Battalion
  - V Artillery Group (65/17 infantry support guns, Royal Italian Army)
  - V Mixed Transport Unit (Royal Italian Army)
  - V Supply Unit (Royal Italian Army)
  - 2x CC.NN. replacement battalions
  - 5th Special Engineer Company (Royal Italian Army)
  - 5th Medical Section (Royal Italian Army)
  - 5th Logistic Section (Royal Italian Army)
  - 5th Carabinieri Section

The supply unit had 1,600 mules and the mixed transport unit 80 light trucks. The division engaged in war crimes in Ethiopia during the Second Italo-Ethiopian War.

== Sources ==
- Lucas, Ettore; de Vecchi, Giorgio (1976). Storia delle Unità Combattenti della MVSN 1923-1943. Giovanni Volpe Editore. pp. 63 to 116 plus errata.
