= USS Nauset =

Tugboat of the United States Navy

Coordinates: 40°38′N 14°38′E

History

United States
- Name: Nauset
- Builder: Cramp Shipbuilding Co., Philadelphia
- Yard number: 544
- Laid down: 10 August 1942
- Launched: 7 September 1942
- Commissioned: 2 March 1943
- Fate: Sunk in enemy action, 9 September 1943

General characteristics
- Displacement: 1,270 tons
- Length: 205 ft
- Beam: 38 ft 6 in
- Draft: 16 ft
- Speed: 16 knots (30 km/h)
- Armament: 1 3 in (76 mm)

USS Nauset (AT–89) was a Navajo class tug in the United States Navy

Nauset was laid down 10 August 1942 by the Cramp Shipbuilding Company, Philadelphia; launched 7 September 1942; and commissioned 2 March 1943.

Following shakedown off the mid-Atlantic and New England coasts, Nauset departed Norfolk, Virginia 28 April, and sailed, via Bermuda, to Mers-el-Kebir, Algeria, arriving 26 May. There she performed towing and salvage operations along the North African coast. Detached in early July, she departed Bizerte on the 8th and steamed eastward to participate in the invasion of Sicily. On the 10th she joined the “Cent” Attack Force and anchored less than three miles off the Scoglitti beaches to await calls for assistance.

Heavy surf, indefinite landmarks, and inexperienced boat crews took their toll, keeping Nauset busy for the next two weeks: at first in the Scoglitti area, then at Licata and Gela. By the end of the month her operational area had expanded to Palermo, whence she departed, in mid-August, to tow USS Shubrick (DD-639) to Malta for repairs. Back in Sicilian waters within a week, she continued salvage operations and towing services from the southern beaches to Palermo until the 23rd. On the 24th, Nauset arrived at Bizerte, completed several local salvage and towing assignments, and then staged for her last operation “Avalanche,” with Salerno its target.

On 7 September, Nauset departed the Tunisian coast with a Royal Navy boat crew as passengers, their boat, an LCA(HR)—assault craft equipped with hedgehog projectors as deck cargo, and hedgehogs and dynamite in her holds. Escaping damage during aerial attacks on the 8th, the tug arrived in the vicinity of the US lowering position soon after “D-day,” 9 September, began. Moving further in toward the “Uncle” beaches, AT–89 commenced lowering the LCA(HR), and by 0230, the British craft had shoved off to explode her hedgehog charges in the shallow waters off the beaches, thus, hopefully, clearing the area of mines. Nauset, in the meantime, stood by to await the craft's return for replenishment.

At 0430, the Luftwaffe paid its first visit to the Allied vessels. Forty minutes later enemy aircraft again flew over the ships in the Gulf of Salerno. Bombs, from a plane heard, but not seen, exploded in close proximity to the tug. Fire enveloped Nauset's entire boat deck and broke out in the motor and generator rooms, cutting all power. She began to list heavily to port and without pressure in the fire plugs, the fires spread quickly.

The tug Intent, followed by USS Narragansett (AT-88), immediately joined in the battle to save the ship, attaching tow lines and turning on their fire hoses, they stood in toward the nearest beach. Burned and wounded men were soon transferred to Intent, while the uninjured continued the battle. The deck fires were extinguished, but those below raged. Flooding soon broached the critical point and Nauset was abandoned.

After abandonment, the tug righted itself to a 20-foot (6 m) list, raising hopes for saving the ship. The captain, Lt. Joseph Orleck, the first lieutenant and the chief bos’n reboarded her to make lines fast from Narragansett. Within seconds, however, a final explosion, probably caused by a mine, rocked the ship. Nauset broke in two and sank, taking the captain and the first lieutenant with her.

Lt. Edwin Lee Reel SR. was the senior surviving officer.

Of her wartime complement of 113, 18 were known dead or missing and 41 suffered severe injuries.

Nauset received two battle stars for her brief service in World War II.
