= SS Robert Rowan =

World War II Liberty ship of the United States

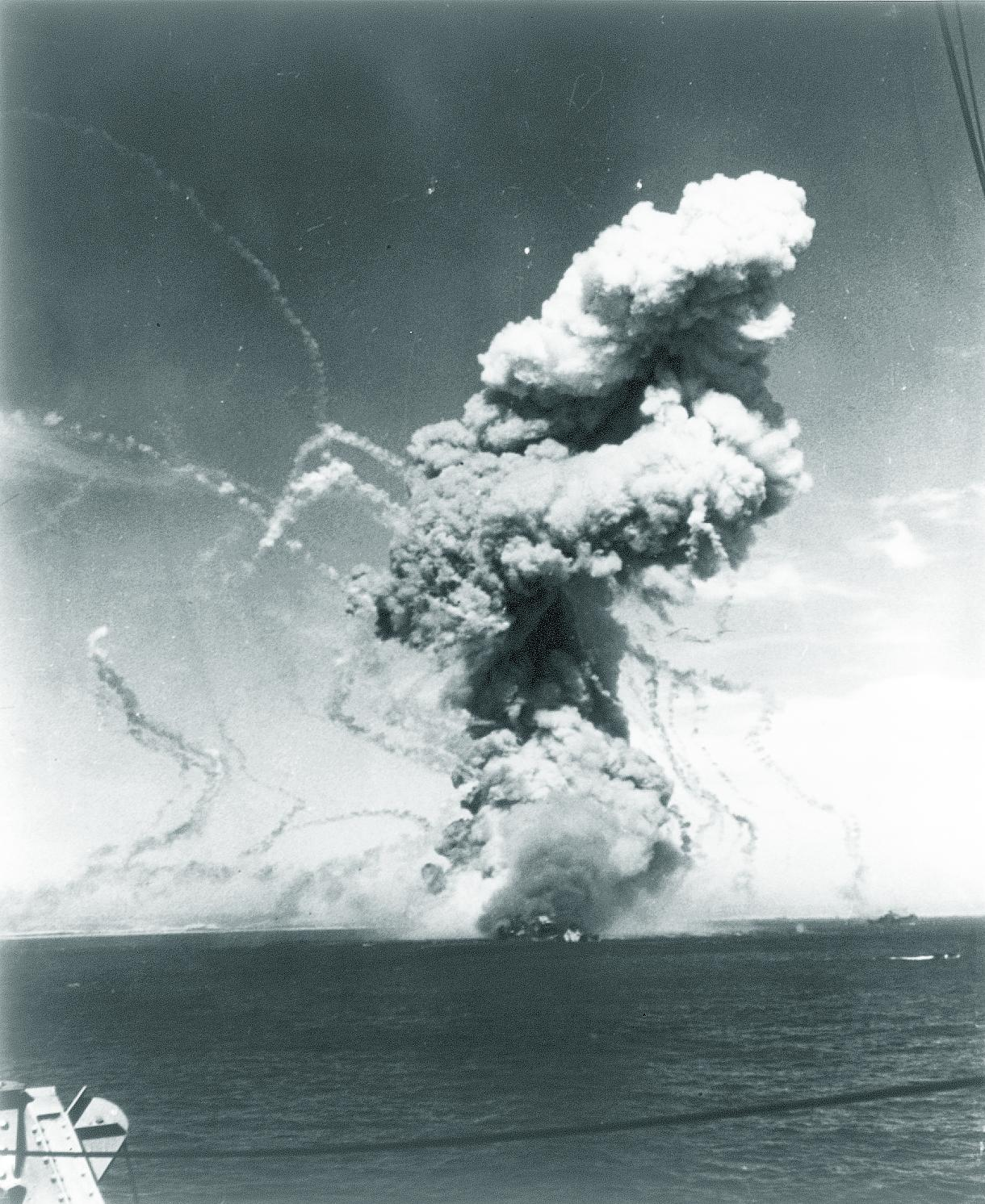
- Robert Rowan on 11 July 1943

History

United States
- Name: Robert Rowan
- Namesake: Robert Rowan
- Builder: North Carolina Shipbuilding Co.
- Way number: 1553
- Laid down: 5 March 1943
- Launched: 6 April 1943
- Fate: Sunk off Sicily, 11 July 1943; Scrapped, 1948

General characteristics
- Class & type: Liberty ship
- Displacement: 14,245 long tons (14,474 t)
- Length: 441 ft 6 in (134.57 m) o/a; 417 ft 9 in (127.33 m) p/p; 427 ft (130 m) w/l
- Beam: 57 ft (17 m)
- Draft: 27 ft 9 in (8.46 m)
- Propulsion: Two oil-fired boilers; Triple-expansion steam engine; 2,500 hp (1,900 kW); Single screw
- Speed: 11 knots (20 km/h; 13 mph)
- Range: 20,000 nmi (37,000 km; 23,000 mi)
- Capacity: 10,856 t (10,685 long tons) deadweight (DWT)
- Crew: 81
- Armament: Stern-mounted 4 in (100 mm) deck gun for use against surfaced submarines, variety of anti-aircraft guns

SS Robert Rowan was an American Liberty ship built in 1943 for service in World War II. Her namesake was Robert Rowan, an American politician.

== Design ==
Like other Liberty ships, she was 441 feet (134 m) long and 56 feet (17 m) wide, carried 9000 tons of cargo and had a top speed of 11 knots (20 km/h). Most Liberty ships were named after prominent deceased Americans.

== Construction and career ==
The keel of the ship was laid on 5 March 1943. Few months later the North Carolina Shipbuilding Company launched in Wilmington under the name Robert Rowan christened by Jean A. Huske from Fayetteville, NC and commissioned later that year.

She was delivered to the Isthmian Steamship Company on 13 April. Her maiden voyage started on 14 May 1943 at Hampton Roads, Virginia to Oran as part of convoy UGS-8A. She was sent on to Gela, Sicily to support the invasion of Sicily (Operation Husky). She arrived at Gela 11 July 1943 with a cargo of ammunition and 334 soldiers of the 18th Infantry. She also carried 14 U.S. Navy personnel, 32 U.S. Navy armed guards, and 41 crewmen. During the battle of Gela the Rowan was hit by three 500 kg bombs. Just before 14:00 hrs German Junkers Ju 88 bombers appeared overhead and attacked the ships in the bay. One bomb passed through the ship, but the other two exploded in the holds. Because of the nature of the cargo the ship was abandoned without any attempt to put the fire out. All 421 men on board safely evacuated the ship and were picked up by PT boats and transferred to nearby destroyers. Within twenty minutes the fire reached her munitions with a tremendous explosion tearing the ship in half. The burning ship came to rest on an even keel and burned for two days. The destroyer USS McLanahan tried to sink the ship because the fires lit up the area during the night, but this failed as the water was too shallow. The hulk lay in the waters off Gela until 1948 when it was sold and scrapped.

== Gallery ==
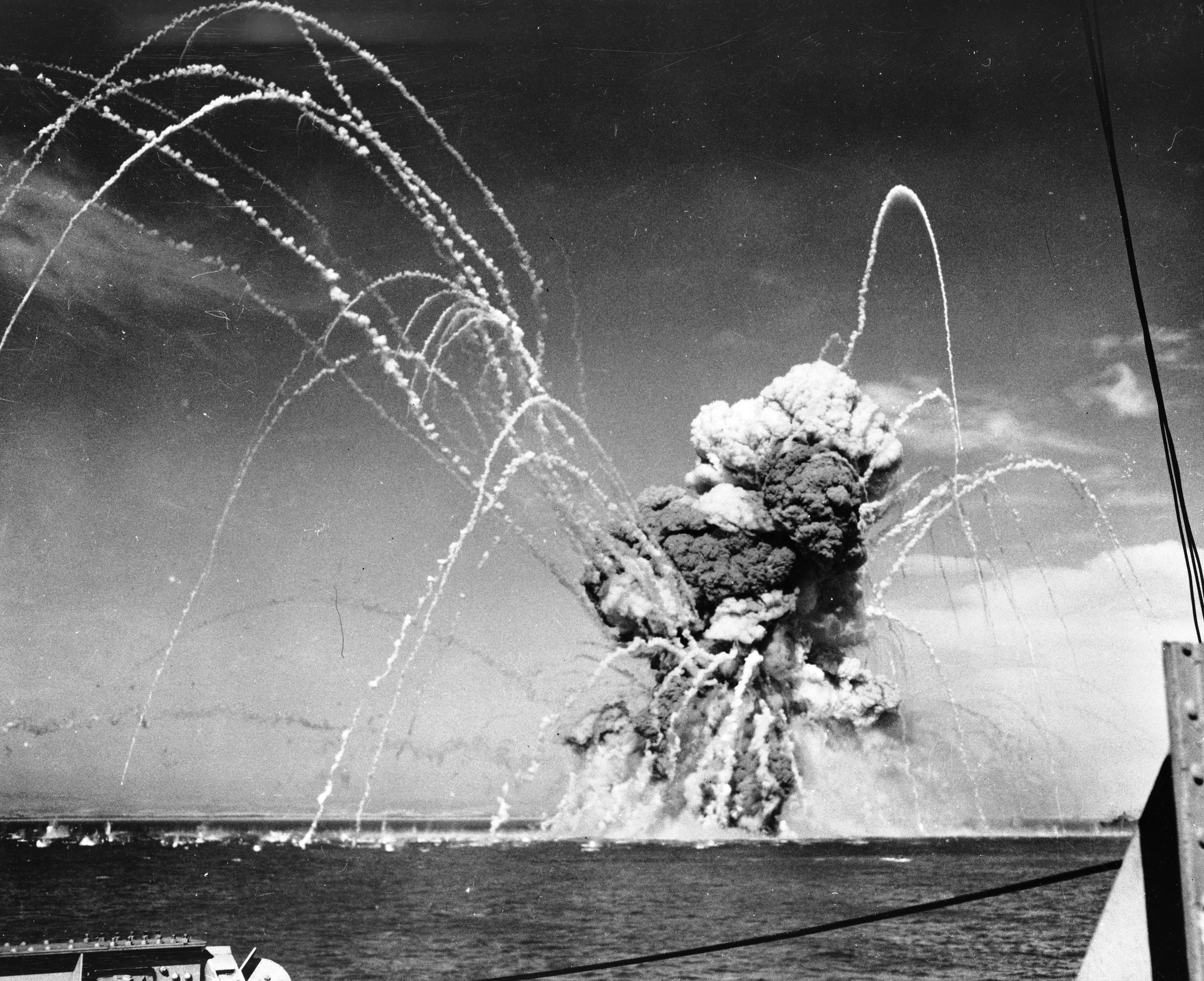
Explosion of SS Robert Rowan off Sicily

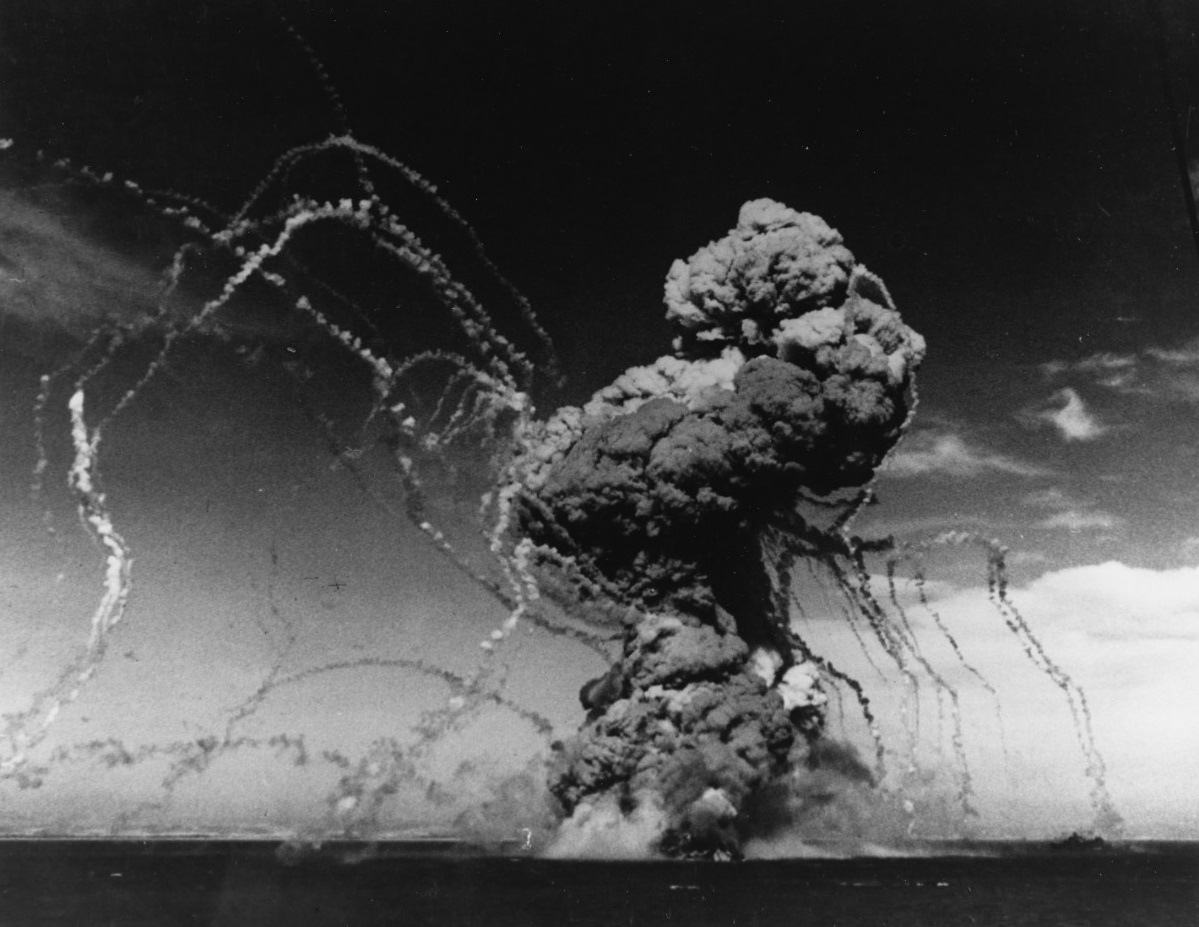

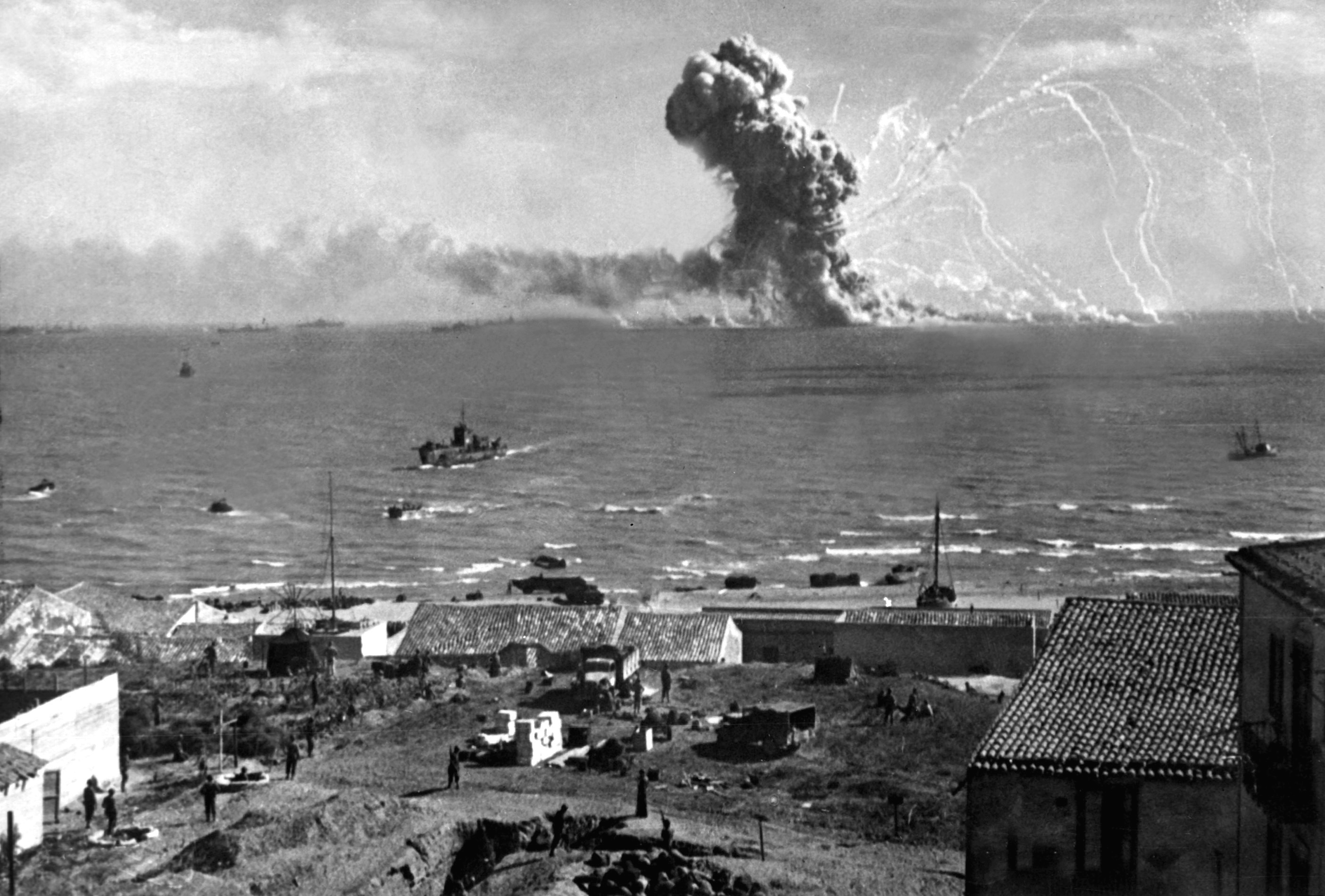
