= Battle of Gela (1943) =

Battle during the Allied Invasion of Sicily

- Part of the Allied invasion of Sicily in the Mediterranean theatre of World War II
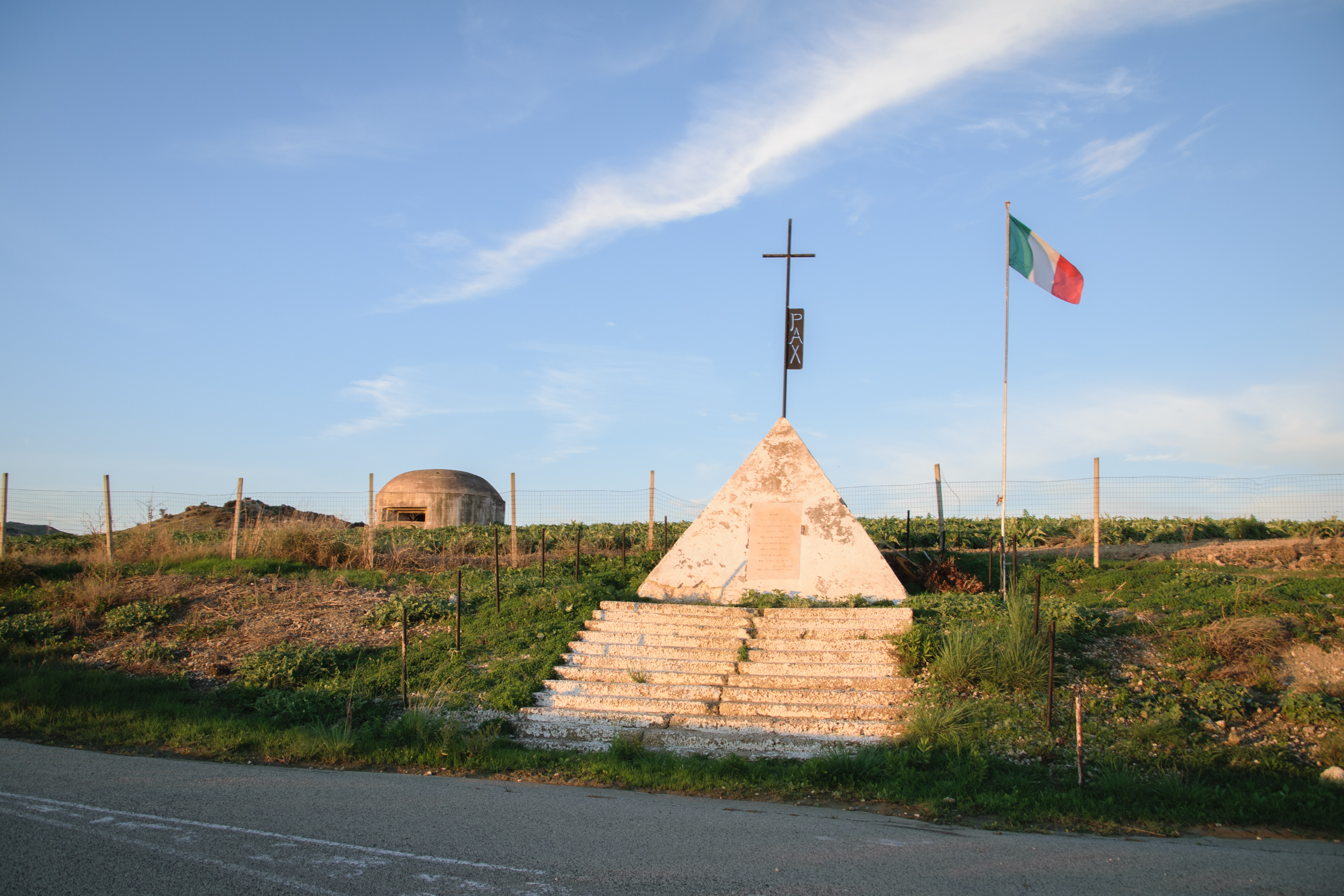
- Memorial to the fallen of the Battle of Gela
Date	10–12 July 1943
Location	Gela, Sicily
Result	Allied victory

Belligerents
United States; United Kingdom	Italy; Germany

Commanders and leaders
(United States) George S. Patton (United States) Terry de la Mesa Allen Sr. (United States) Hugh Joseph Gaffey (United States) Henry Kent Hewitt (United States) Charles Leslie Keerans Jr. †	(Fascist Italy) Alfredo Guzzoni (Fascist Italy) Arnaldo Rabellino (POW) (Fascist Italy) Domenico Chirieleison (Nazi Germany) Hans-Valentin Hube (Nazi Germany) Paul Conrath

Units involved
Gela beachead: 1st Infantry Division; 2nd Armored Division; Naval support: USS Savannah; USS Boise; HMS Abercrombie; USS Shubrick; USS Jeffers; USS Maddox; USS Butler; USS Glennon	Gela beachead: 429th Coastal Battalion; North of Gela: 4th Infantry Division "Livorno"; 1st Fallschirm-Panzer Division Hermann Göring; Air support: Luftflotte 2; 3rd Air Fleet; 4th Air Fleet

Casualties and losses
U.S.: 2,300 casualties 1 destroyer sunk	Italian: 3,350 killed 5,000 wounded 2,000 prisoners German: 630 killed, wounded, and prisoners 14 tanks

The amphibious Battle of Gela was the opening engagement of the American portion of the Allied Invasion of Sicily during World War II. United States Navy ships landed United States Army troops along the eastern end of the south coast of Sicily; and withstood attacks by Luftwaffe and Regia Aeronautica aircraft while defending the beachhead against attacks by Livorno Division and German Göring Division tanks until the US Army captured the Ponte Olivo Airfield for use by United States Army Air Forces planes. The battle convinced United States Army officers of the value of naval artillery support, and revealed problems coordinating air support from autonomous air forces during amphibious operations.

== Background ==
The invasion of Sicily followed the Allied capture of Tunisia in North Africa and preceded the Allied invasion of Italy as a means of diverting Axis forces from the eastern front with the Soviet Union until the Western Allies were prepared to invade occupied Europe through France. Ground forces under overall command of General Dwight D. Eisenhower were transported by naval forces under overall command of Admiral Andrew Cunningham. The invasion was constrained by marginally effective air cover from 670 Allied fighters operating at maximum range which limited patrolling time over one hundred miles of invasion beaches and prevented proportional response to incoming raids. There were three wings (twenty squadrons) of Supermarine Spitfires operating from airfields on Malta and two groups of Curtiss P-40 Warhawks from airfields on Pantelleria and Gozo. Allied air forces refused to provide air support for Allied ground forces until Axis air forces had been neutralized; and, since Axis bombing continued through 12 July, the role of Allied aircraft was negligible in the fighting at Gela. Pre-invasion strategic bombing reduced Luftflotte 2 strength to 175 planes in Sicily, but 418 additional Luftwaffe and 449 Regia Aeronautica aircraft remained serviceable at bases in Italy to be flown in as required.

Allied ground forces had no idea when, where, in what numbers, or under what circumstances they might see Allied aircraft. Unlike the earlier invasion of North Africa and later invasion of Italy, the United States invasion fleet included no aircraft carriers. Carriers which had supported the American landings during Operation Torch had been reassigned without replacement. The escort carrier USS Santee was defending UG convoys from U-boats while the other three Sangamon-class escort carriers had been transferred to the Pacific to support the Guadalcanal campaign and the fleet carrier USS Ranger was training new pilots on the United States Atlantic coast.

=== Setting ===
The fishing town of Gela was on a limestone plateau at 150-foot (46 m) elevation behind a beach with a 900-foot (270 m) pier. Plains cultivated for grain extended inland behind the community of 32,000. The mouth of the Gela River was 1 mile (1.6 km) east of the pier and the mouth of the Acate River was 5 miles (8 km) east of the Gela River. The sand and stone beach between the rivers was from 10–30 yards (9–27 m) wide and backed by 900 yards (820 m) of dunes. The drainage divide between the two rivers was the 400-foot (120 m) Piano Lupo highland 7 miles (11 km) northeast of Gela with a strategic junction of roads including the coastal highway between Gela and Scoglitti and roads leading inland to Niscemi and Caltagirone.

=== American forces ===
The 52d Troop Carrier Wing of 222 Douglas C-47 Skytrains from North Africa carried the airborne 505th Infantry Regiment for a parachute drop over Piano Lupo. A western task force of 601 ships (including 130 warships and 324 landing craft and transports with 1,124 shipboard landing boats) under the command of Vice Admiral Henry Kent Hewitt carried the Seventh United States Army under the command of Lieutenant General George S. Patton. Both officers sailed aboard the flagship transport USS Monrovia. Patton commanded three times as many soldiers as Hewitt had landed eight months earlier at Morocco during Operation Torch. Americans had not previously sustained so many combat troops over beaches without a port; so the amphibious shipping included nine new types of landing boats, five new types of landing ships, and project Goldrush pontoon causeways untested under combat conditions. The invasion was the European combat premier of tank landing ships (LST)s only a week after the Pacific Operation Cartwheel. The western task force was divided into Task Force C to land the 3rd Infantry Division near Licata (sector Joss) on the western flank, Task Force K to land the 45th Infantry Division near Scoglitti (sector Cent) on the eastern flank, and Task Force H to land the 16th and 26th Regiments of the 1st Infantry Division with the 531st Engineers and the 1st 3rd and 4th Rangers, with the 83rd Chemical Mortar Battalion attached near Gela (sector Dime). The reserve force of the 2nd Armored Division and 18th Regiment of the 1st Infantry Division was landed on the first day of fighting to support the 1st Infantry Division.

=== Axis forces ===
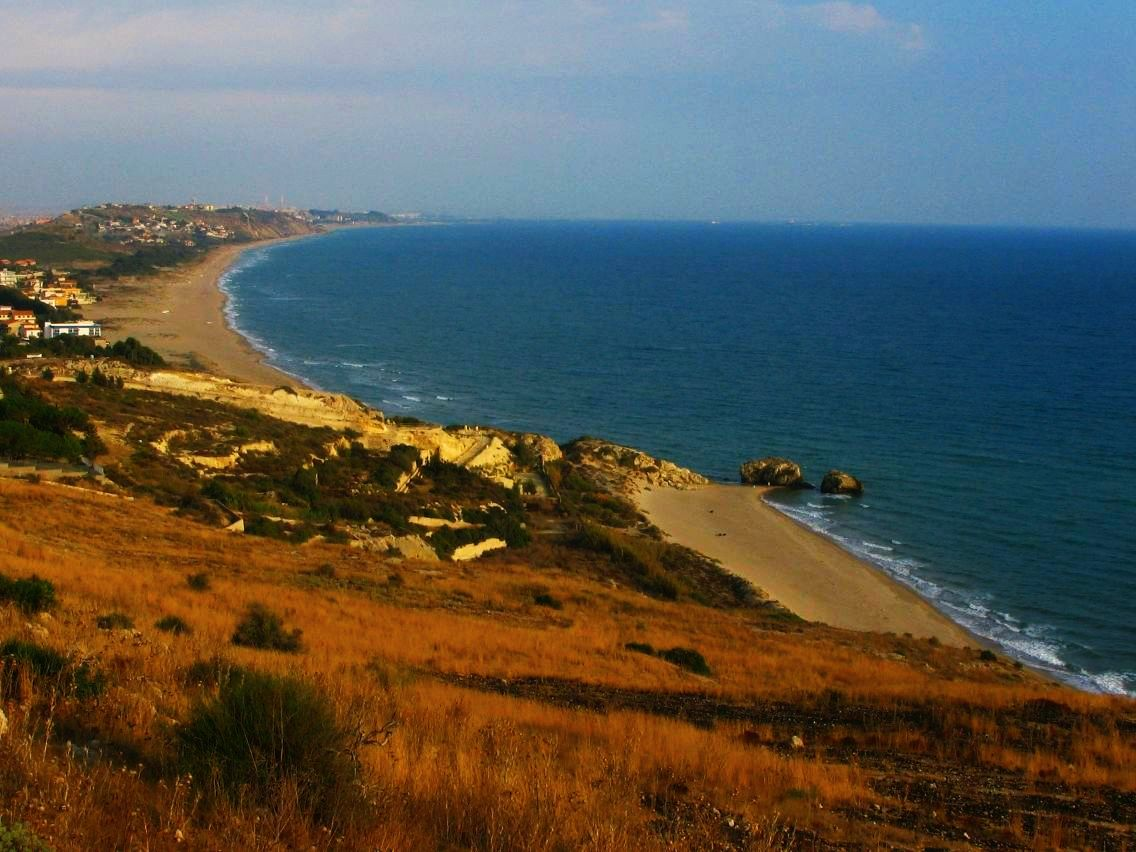
21st century view of Gela from the west.

The Gela invasion beaches were defended by the Italian 429th Coastal Battalion under Major Rubellino using barbed wire, concrete pillboxes, and anti-tank guns. The 429th Coastal Battalion was also defending the town itself. The beach on either side of the Gela pier was mined and defended by machine guns on both flanks and artillery batteries 7,000 yards (6,400 m) inland, on Cape Soprano to the west, and on Monte Lungo to the north. The sand and stone beach on the east side of the Gela River was defended by three machine gun nests at the east end and by artillery batteries 9,000 yards (8,200 m) to the north and 10,000 yards (9,100 m) to the northwest. The Italian 4th Infantry Division "Livorno" was positioned near Niscemi and supported by the Italian Mobile Group "E" at Ponte Olivo with obsolete R35 and Fiat tanks to respond when invasion points became known. They were joined on the afternoon of the first day by 9,000 German combat troops of the 1st Fallschirm-Panzer Division Hermann Göring with 46 Panzerkampfwagen III and 32 Panzerkampfwagen IV tanks from Caltagirone, reinforced with a regiment of the 15th Panzergrenadier Division with the schwere Panzer Abteilung 504 (s.Pz.Abt. 504) tank Battalion with 17 Tiger I tanks attached.

Air support was available from one staffel of Jagdgeschwader 53 Messerschmitt Bf 109G-6 fighters at Catania, two staffeln of Jagdgeschwader 77 Bf 109G-6 fighters at Trapani, another Jagdgeschwader 77 staffel at Sciacca, two staffeln of Schlachtgeschwader 2 Focke-Wulf Fw 190F-2 ground attack fighter-bombers at Castelvetrano, and two staffeln of Schnellkampfgeschwader 10 Fw 190A-5 fast bombers at Gerbini Airfield. Junkers Ju 88A and Savoia-Marchetti SM 79 medium bombers could reach Gela from bases in Italy.

== Prelude ==
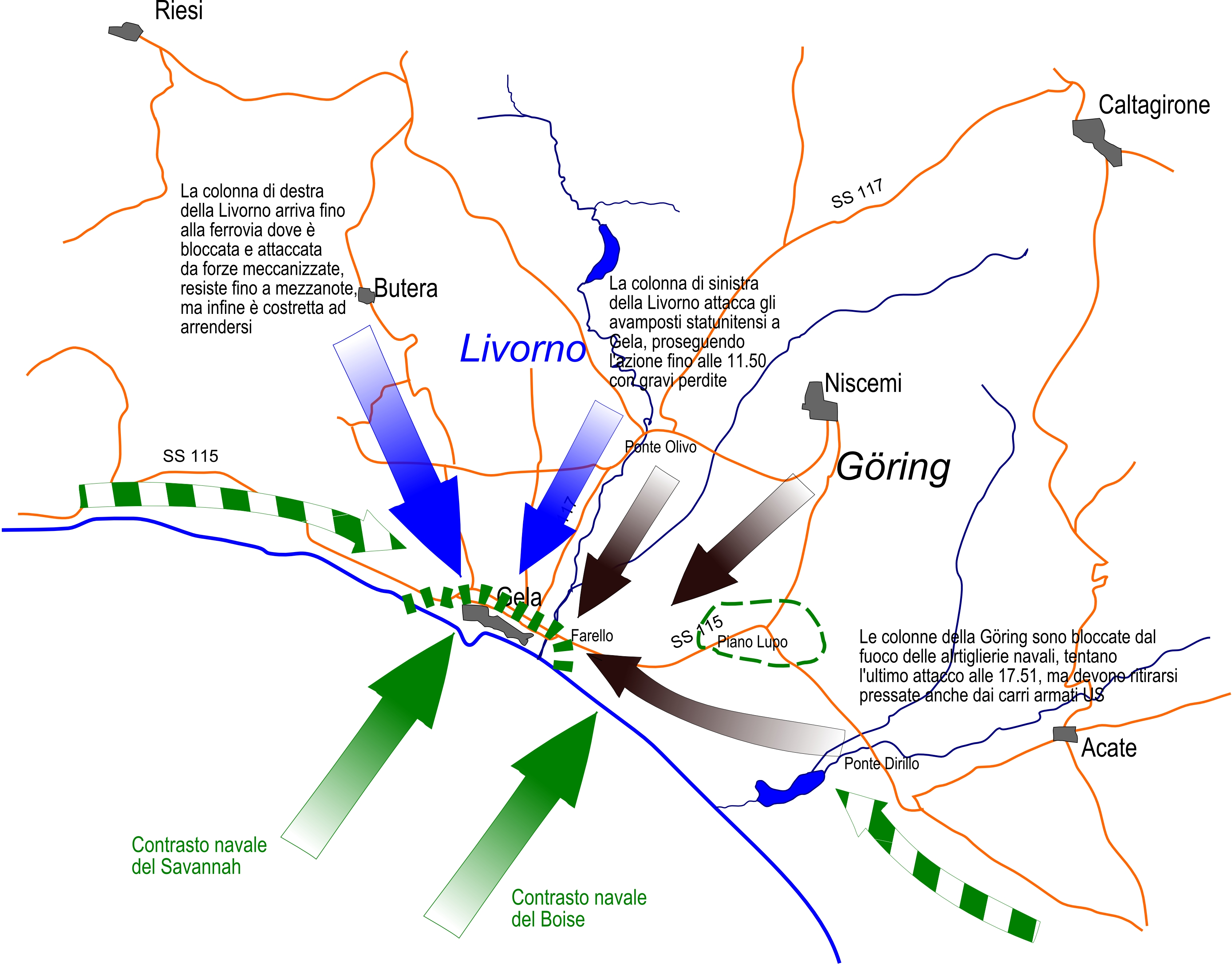
Map of Gela and surrounding area show troop movements.

The larger transports sailed from Oran on 5 July as convoy NCF 1 and were screened by destroyers as they hugged the African coast eastbound while the gunfire support cruisers sailed on a parallel course as a covering force to the north. The LSTs, LCIs, LCTs and patrol craft sailed directly from Tunisia as convoys TJM 1 and TJS 1. The convoys were spotted and all German forces on Sicily were alerted at 18:40 on 9 July. Beaufort scale force 7 winds created 12-foot (3.7 m) seas causing widespread seasickness among the embarked troops. Winds moderated on the evening of 9 July as ships divided into task forces C, H, and K and proceeded to assigned anchorages off the Sicilian coast. As the ships anchored, airborne troops of the 505th Infantry Regiment were scattered by wind and aircraft navigation errors. Fewer than 200 of the 3,400 paratroopers were able to reach the strategic Piano Lupo highland before the defending Livorno Division arrived.

The transports Joseph T. Dickman, (Note: Ship manned by United States Coast Guard crew. (Willoughby (1957) p. 221)) Prince Charles, Prince Leopold, Oberon, Barnett, Monrovia, Lyon, Samuel Chase, Betelgeuse, Thurston, Elizabeth C. Stanton, Orizaba, and Chateau Thierry anchored approximately 6 nautical miles (11 km; 6.9 mi) off the mouth of the Gela River with LCIs, LSTs, and salvage vessels slightly further offshore; and the destroyers USS Murphy, Glennon, Maddox, Bernadou, and Dallas screened the seaward side of the anchorage. The light cruiser USS Savannah and destroyer USS Shubrick patrolled a gunfire support area west of the anchorage, while USS Boise and Jeffers patrolled a similar gunfire support area east of the anchorage. The Army hoped for surprise, and declined Navy suggestions for pre-invasion bombardment.

== Battle ==
=== 10 July ===
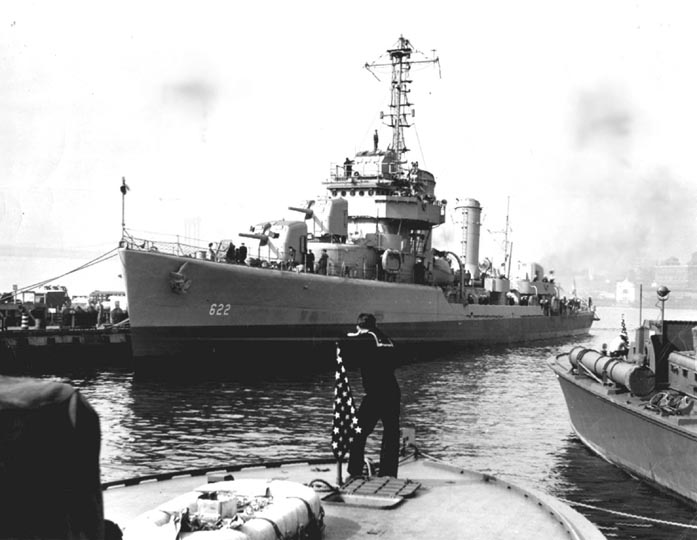
USS Maddox was bombed and sunk on the first day of the invasion.

The transports started unloading shortly after midnight, and General Guzzoni declared an emergency at 01:00. The first assault wave from Barnett, Lyon, Thurston and Stanton landed about 02:45. Shubrick destroyed two XVIII Coastal Brigade searchlights illuminating the first wave and fired on several XVIII Coastal Brigade artillery positions. Initial waves had landed on all beaches by 03:35. The Rangers landed on either side of the Gela pier. The 26th Regiment landed on the east side of the Gela River, and the 16th Regiment landed east of the 26th Regiment. Three hundred men of the 45th Division's 180th Regiment accidentally landed among the 16th Regiment on beaches west of the Acate River.

The 12th Air Support Command planned to provide air cover of 12 fighters over Gela during daylight hours, but the number actually available was never more than eight and sometimes as few as two. Axis air raids took place around the clock; so no Allied fighters were present when most Axis aircraft arrived. The first Allied fighters arrived at 05:01 before sunrise at 05:46; but Axis bombers had arrived before first light. Bombs and flares began falling at 04:21 and Maddox sank at 04:58 with 212 of her crew less than two minutes after being hit by a bomb dropped by a German Junker Ju-88 from unit KG-54. LST-345 and submarine chaser PC-621 were damaged by collision while maneuvering to avoid bombs.Savannah shot down a Ju 88 at 05:14. Absence of fighter cover during the initial Axis bombing attack created an enduring shipboard perception they were responsible for their own air defense and should prioritize aircraft destruction above identification. Axis fighters and fighter-bombers were able to make undetected low-level approaches from Catania under the fleet's radar horizon by flying down the Acate River canyon at the eastern edge of the Gela beachhead. Allied fighters patrolling at altitude to engage medium bombers were perceived as dive bombers and subjected to friendly fire losses when they attempted to engage low altitude air raids. Ships were using proximity fuzed anti-aircraft ammunition for the first time in the European theater.

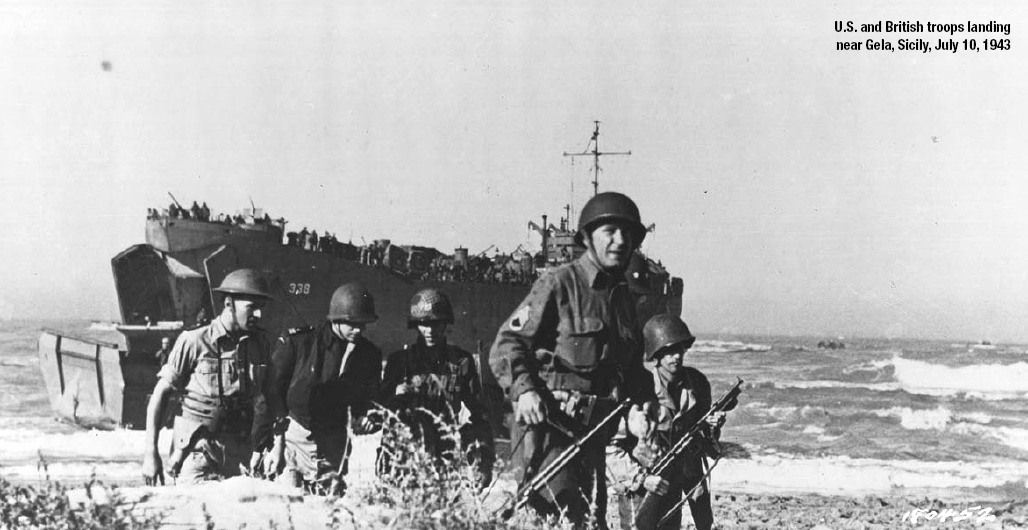
U.S. and British troops landing near Gela.

As the Rangers landed, they were immediately taken under fire from the Italian pillboxes and coastal batteries. The Rangers attacked the town of Gela hoping to capture the Gela pier for offloading the LSTs. Italian defenders destroyed the masonry pier with demolition charges at 02:40; but the Rangers captured the town by 08:00 with three 8 cm FK M. 5 artillery pieces and 200 prisoners of the XVIII Coastal Brigade defenders. The 429th Coastal Battalion had lost 194 men killed or wounded, 45% of its force. The 1st Infantry Division hoped to capture the Ponte Olivo Airfield within 24 hours of landing. The 26th Regiment was prepared to assist the Rangers in capturing Gela; but, when that proved unnecessary, began moving inland to take the high ground west of Ponte Olivo. The 16th Regiment intended to join the 505th airborne regiment assumed to be in control of the Piano Lupo highland east of Ponte Olivo. There they planned to defend against attacks from Niscemi and prepare for a coordinated attack with the 26th Regiment against Ponte Olivo. The 16th Regiment encountered heavy resistance from the machine gun nests at the east end of their landing beach; and XVIII Coastal Brigade artillery and mortars were targeting the beach as LCIs began landing support troops east of the Gela River at 04:30.

After sunrise, minesweepers began clearing mines near the beach so the LSTs could start landing vehicles at 08:00. LST-338 was straddled by Italian shellfire as soon as it beached. Italian artillery intensified firing at the eastern beach from 07:10 until Boise and Savannah temporarily silenced the batteries at 09:40. Landing craft temporarily stopped using the beach when Italian artillery resumed firing at 10:10 and destroyed some landing craft and supplies offloaded onto the beach. Half-tracks attempting to move inland from the eastern beach encountered an Italian minefield. Teller mines destroyed trucks, DUKWs and five navy bulldozers. Mine detectors were unreliable after exposure to salt water during the landing, and the first path through the minefield was not cleared until 12:12. By noon, not a single piece of Allied artillery had been landed, and none of the ten tanks assigned to the 1st Division were ashore. Landing craft had to wait up to four hours to be unloaded while the beach was congested by vehicles waiting to move inland. Unloading was frequently interrupted by air attacks and artillery fire; and a shortage of landing craft developed as nearly 200 were disabled by shellfire or broaching in the surf. Unexpected sand bars paralleled the beach 150 yards (137 m) offshore and prevented some landing craft (including LSTs carrying tanks) from getting ashore to offload their cargo. Some soldiers landing on the sandbars in darkness drowned wading toward the beach with their heavy packs. In the confusion ashore, some of the 1st Infantry Division's supporting artillery was diverted to the Licata beaches to the west and the Scoglitti beaches to the east; and was significantly delayed traveling overland to Gela.

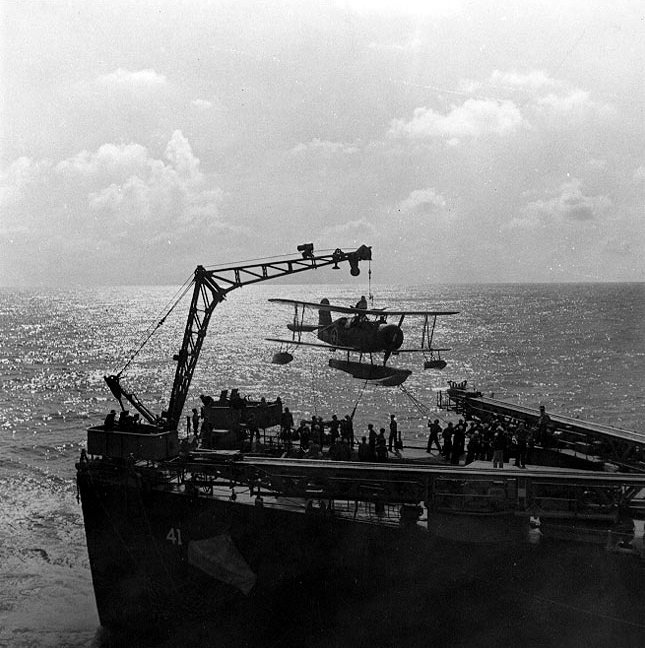
Cruiser launched Curtiss SOC Seagulls had a short life expectancy without fighter cover – four were shot down and all others disabled during the battle.

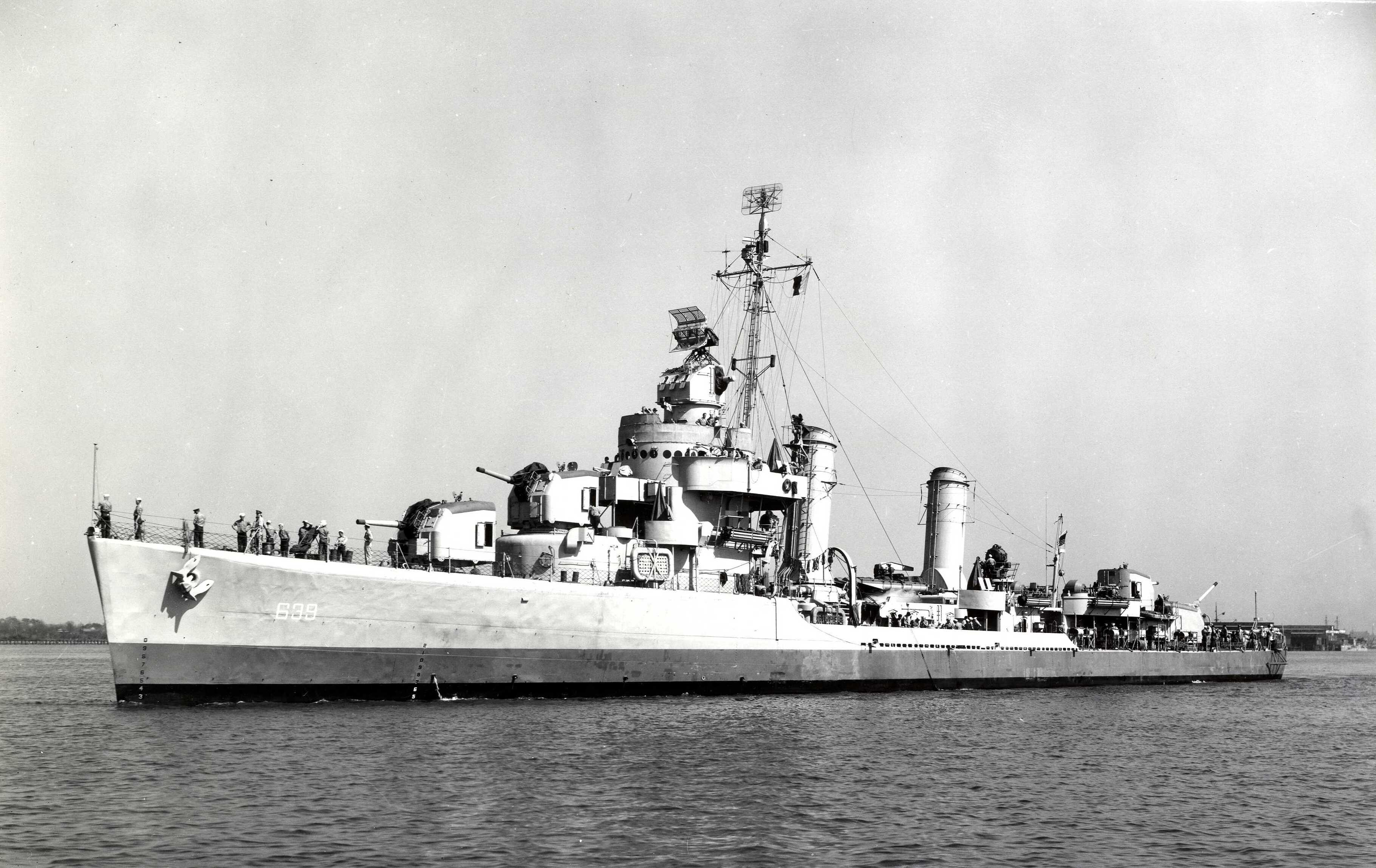
USS Shubrick earned a Ranger's praise: "It's pretty accurate work when a destroyer some 2 or 3 miles offshore knocks out three tanks some 7 or 8 miles inland."

Boise and Savannah launched Curtiss SOC Seagull observation seaplanes at 06:00 to locate targets and perform gunnery spotting. Bf 109s had shot down both Savannah planes by 07:30 as the Italian Livorno Division launched a three-prong counterattack to recapture Gela. The Italian counterattack was reported by an American newspaper: "Supported by no less than forty-five tanks, a considerable force of infantry of the Livorno Division attacked the American troops around Gela. The American division beat them back with severe casualties. This was the heaviest response to the Allied advance." An infantry column from Butera approached Gela from the west while a second infantry column preceded by 13 Fiat 3000 tanks approached Gela along the road from Ponte Olivo, and a third infantry column preceded by about 25 Fiat 3000 tanks approached the beachhead east of the Gela River from Niscemi. Savannah launched its two remaining SOCs at 08:30 as Rangers directed Shubrick gunfire destroying three of the tanks approaching Gela along the Ponte Olivo Road. Surviving tanks entered the town of Gela while the Italian infantry was immobilized by gunfire from Shubrick. The Rangers destroyed three of the tanks before the remaining seven retreated with their accompanying infantry. The Rangers used the captured 8 cm Italian artillery to repel the Livorno Division infantry column approaching Gela from Butera.

The Italian column from Niscemi pushed through a 505th Regiment roadblock to reach the Piano Lupo road junction before troops from the 16th Regiment arrived. Boise opened fire at 09:10 after their SOCs observed the Italian column approaching along the Niscemi Road and radioed coordinates before being chased off by Bf 109s. The Livorno infantry remained in previously prepared defensive positions to avoid the naval gunfire while the tanks continued toward the beachhead until they encountered the two forward battalions of the 16th Regiment. Bf 109s shot down another Savannah SOC and the last SOC returned to the ship damaged. Boise, Savannah and the British monitor HMS Abercrombie fired on the Italian column from 10:47 to 11:08. The 16th Regiment occupied Piano Lupo as the tanks and infantry from Niscemi withdrew under combined pressure from naval gunfire and the 16th Infantry Regiment. Boise launched the last operational SOC at 12:19 and it was shot down by Bf 109s as Boise fired on the Italians from 12:45 to 12:51. The naval artillery destroyed two tanks and the 16th Infantry destroyed two others.

Axis bombing raids hit the beach at 13:20 and 14:30 in support of the Hermann Göring Division armored regiment counterattack against the eastern beachhead. A high-altitude bombing attack at 15:30 was followed by intermittent attacks for the remainder of the day. The Hermann Göring Division approached Piano Lupo from Niscemi while 15th Panzergrenadiers supported by 17 Tiger I tanks approached from the Acate River. After some difficulty maneuvering the Tiger tanks through olive groves, the 15th Panzergrenadiers overran the 1st battalion of the 45th Division's 180th infantry regiment before being stopped by the 3rd battalion. The Hermann Göring Division pushed through the 16th Infantry Regiment in Piano Lupo, but paused as they encountered naval gunfire when moving off the Piano Lupo highland toward the beachhead. After waiting through the remaining daylight for a rendezvous with the stalled 15th Panzergrenadiers, the Hermann Göring Division withdrew at dusk to regroup. As the Hermann Göring Division withdrew, the reserve force of the 2nd Armored Division and 18th Infantry Regiment began landing at 17:00 over the beaches being vacated by the 26th Infantry Regiment. LST-313 was attempting to offload anti-tank artillery when three or four fighters dropped bombs on the pontoon causeway being used to offload the LSTs. One bomb struck LST-313, killing 21 men, damaging embarked vehicles, and igniting a gasoline fire causing a series of ammunition explosions. The burning LST, with the 26th Infantry's anti-tank artillery, was abandoned at 18:24; and continuing explosions scattered the pontoons, causing nearby LST-312 to broach, and prevented the offloading of more LSTs. The 1st Infantry Division requested extended air cover after being bombed from 17:30 to 19:30, and Axis bombing continued at a rate of 275–300 sorties per day with half arriving during hours of darkness. Gunfire support ships provided covering fire as the 1st Infantry Division began retreating back toward the beach at 21:50 under cover of darkness. Only three LSTs (carrying half-tracks but no tanks) had been unloaded when the 1st Infantry Division requested immediate tank support at 22:15. Axis bombing of beaches and ships intensified at 2245.

The Luftwaffe had flown 370 sorties on 10 July and lost 16 aircraft destroyed or missing. According to Italian sources, 141 sorties were flown by the Regia Aeronautica which lost 11 aircraft on the first day of the landings. That evening, Italian Stukas or Reggiane Re.2002s sank the Indian hospital ship Talamba 3–5 nmi (6–9 km; 3–6 mi) off the beaches of Sicily with heavy loss of lives.

=== 11 July ===
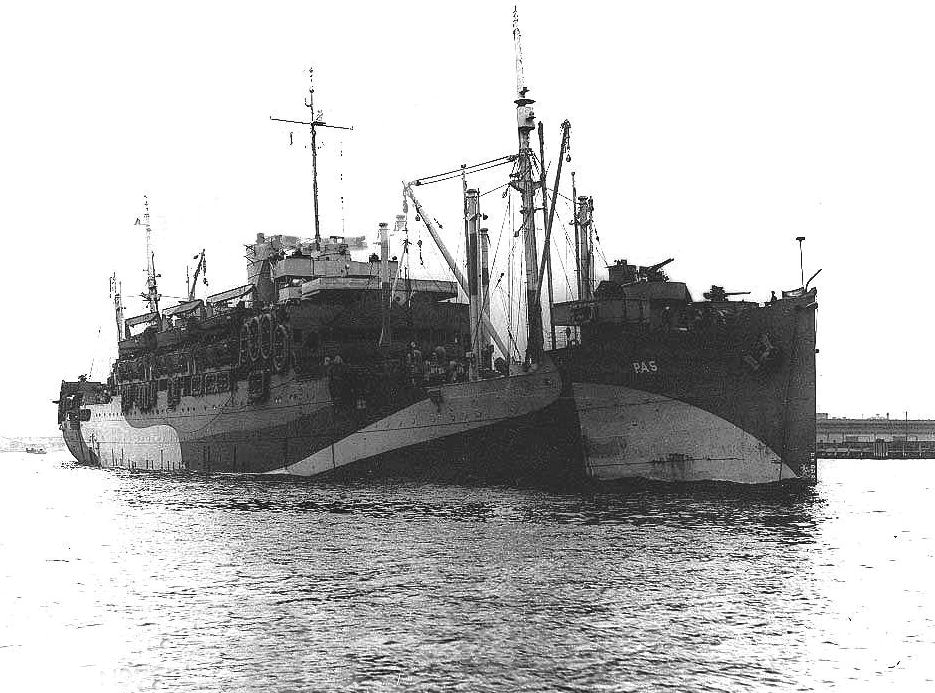
USS Barnett was hit by a bomb on the morning of 11 July.

Tugs refloated LST-312 around midnight. The first American tanks were landed at 02:00 and these 67th Armor Regiment vehicles promptly became stuck in soft beach sand. Bent steel matting intended to support the tanks' weight became entangled in their treads and bogey wheels. USS Butler replaced Shubrick as the western gunfire support destroyer at 05:30 and Glennon replaced Jeffers as the eastern destroyer at 06:20. Twelve SM 79s bombed the transport anchorage at 06:35 holing Dickman and Orizaba with near miss bomb fragments and striking Barnett with a bomb, killing seven army personnel, wounding 35 more, and starting a fire. It was the first of 14 Axis air raids on the beachhead that day, and covered a coordinated Axis attack. While the Livorno Division attacked the Rangers at Gela in three columns from the west side of the Gela River, the Hermann Göring Division attacked the 1st Infantry Division beachhead on the east side of the Gela River. Sixty Panzer III and Panzer IV tanks surviving the previous day's naval gunfire advanced in two columns. The 1st Battalion advanced from Niscemi and the 2nd Battalion from the Ponte Olivo Airfield while the 15th Panzergrenadiers again advanced down the Acate River valley to the east. The German forces from the east planned to meet the Italian forces from the west at the Gela beachhead. The German 2nd Battalion swept past the 3rd Battalion of the 26th Infantry Regiment at 06:40; and the 26th began retreating toward the beach, while the 16th Infantry Regiment delayed the German 1st Battalion until naval gunfire began to take effect at mid-morning.

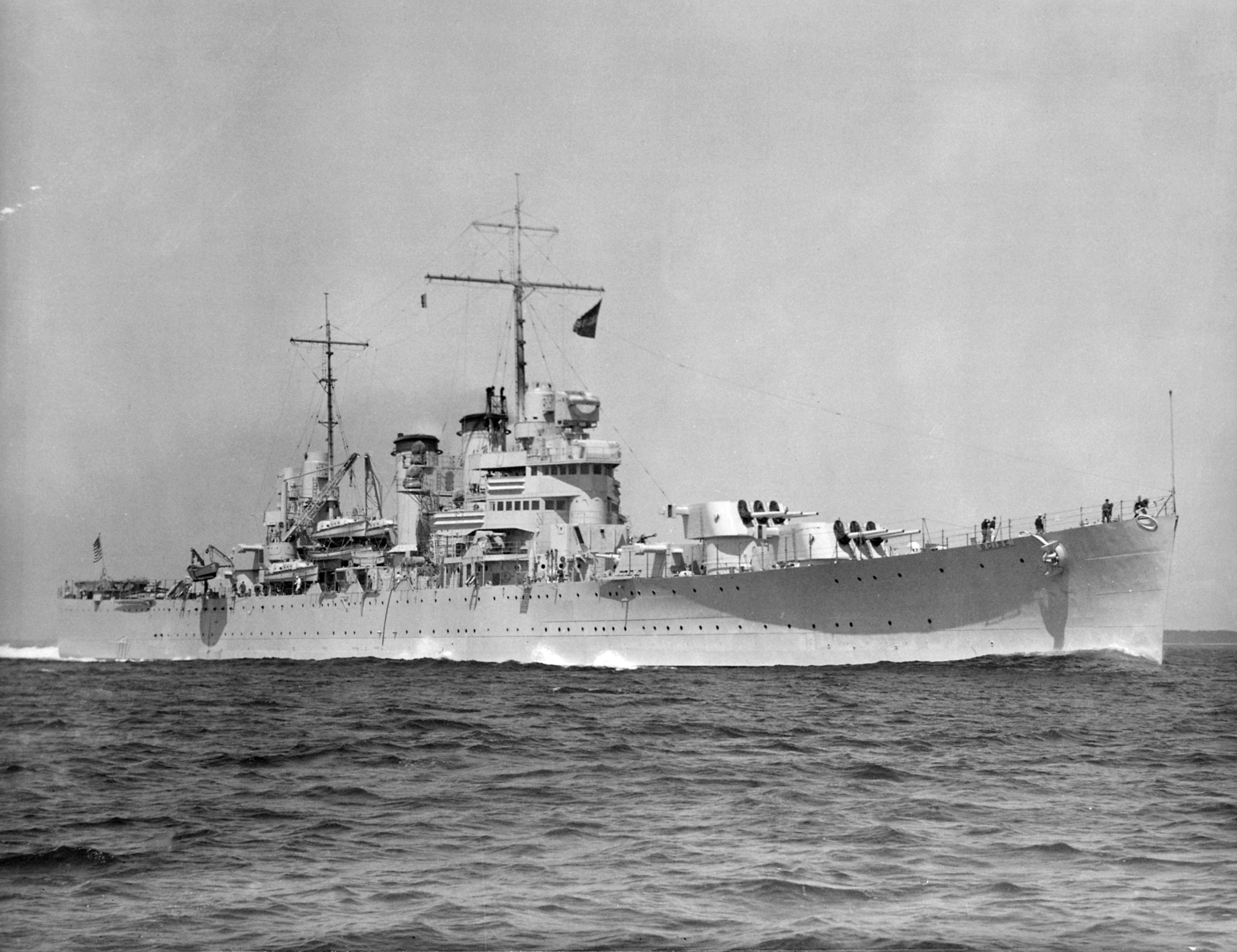
Brooklyn-class cruisers Boise (pictured) and her sister ship Savannah, demonstrated the effectiveness of naval gunfire against tanks.

While the sixty tanks landed earlier still wallowed in the dunes, five American tanks landed from LST-2 at 08:45 immediately went into action without being dewaterproofed. By that time, the German tanks were within 2,400 yards (2,200 m) of the beachhead. Every man on the beach, including yeomen, electricians, carpenters, and intelligence and supply officers of the Advanced Naval Base Group, was hastily armed and formed a firing line along the dunes with engineers of the Army shore parties. Ships began gunfire support requested by shore parties at 09:15, and Boise fired on the tanks from 10:40 to 11:42. Army observers reported 13 tanks destroyed by Boise, but after the war it was claimed that majority of these had been destroyed by the four mobile tanks of CCB, 2nd Armored Division. The 15th Panzergrenadiers in the Acate River valley were stopped by the 505th airborne infantry troops who had landed 36 hours earlier; and the westernmost column of the Livorno Division was stopped by the 3rd Infantry Division. Savannah fired 500 rounds of 6-inch (152 mm) shells, killing more than half of the Italian infantry advancing on Gela and leaving human bodies hanging from trees. Rangers took 400 prisoners from the dazed survivors. Although unable to reach Gela, Lieutenant-Colonel Dante Hugo Leonardi's 3rd Battalion from the 34th Infantry Regiment "Livorno" took a number of prisoners from forward elements of the US 26th Infantry Regiment. The Sarasota Herald Tribune confirmed on 12 July that no less than seven determined counterattacks against the US beachhead on 10 and 11 July had been carried out on the part of the Livorno Division, "The heaviest of seven Italian counter-attacks was met and beaten back by American troops in the Gela area. The attack was launched by the Italian's Fourth Livorno Division with 45 tanks in support."

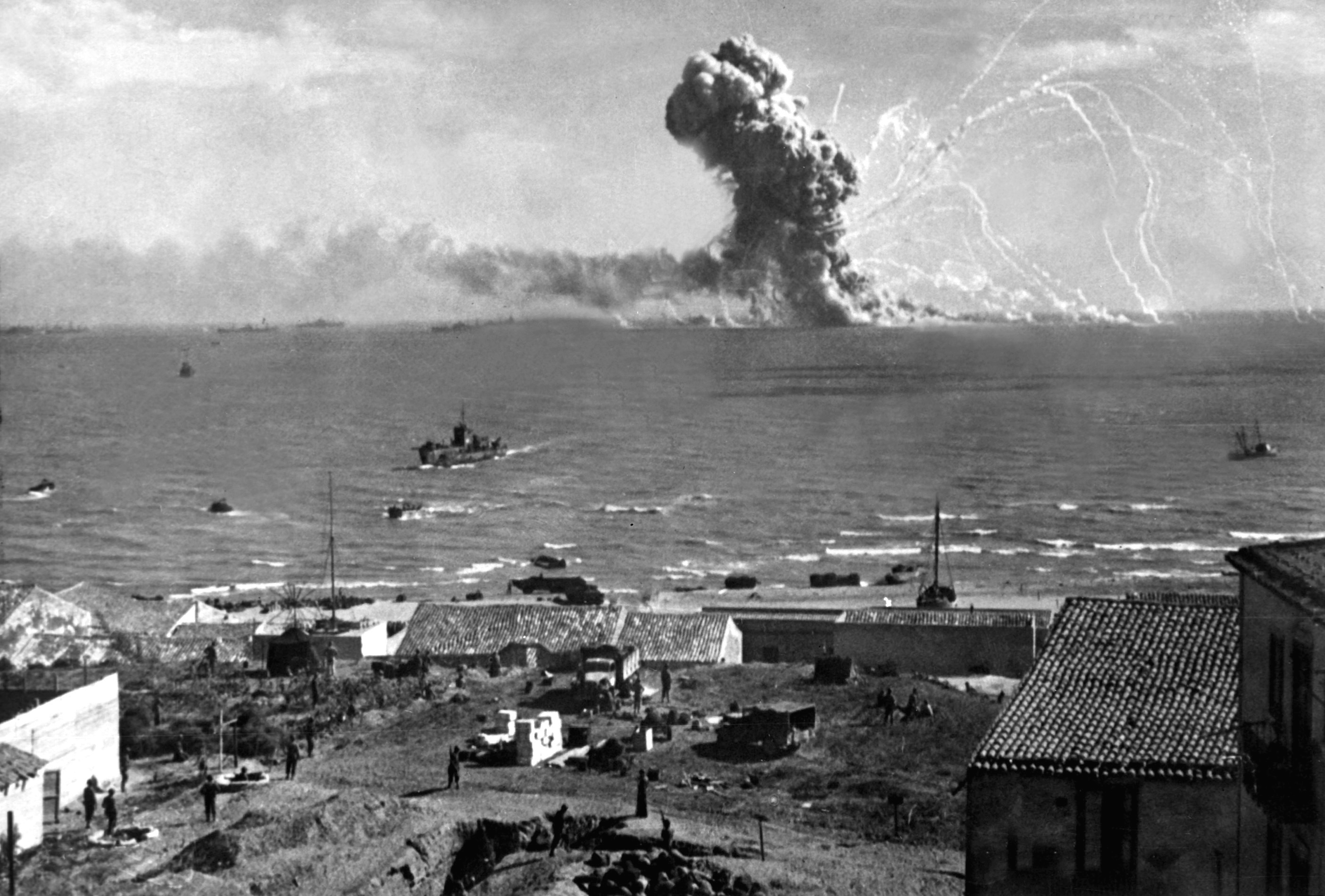
Liberty ship Robert Rowan explodes after being bombed on 11 July.

While American forces ashore stopped the Axis advance, minelayers spent the afternoon placing a protective minefield offshore of the anchorage. Axis bombing of the anchorage resumed at 12:35 and continued intermittently with repeated attacks from 13:51 to 15:35. A 15:45 attack by 35 Ju 88s with escorting Bf 109s hit the Liberty ship Robert Rowan. The Liberty ship's ammunition cargo detonated at 17:30; but the sunken ship was not submerged in the shallow anchorage, and fires illuminated the anchorage for a heavy bombing attack from 19:47 to 19:52 followed by a series of dive-bombing attacks beginning at 21:34 and lasting past midnight. Many ships were damaged by near misses, but only one LST remained to be unloaded at 16:00. Boise fired at Niscemi from 18:26 to 19:37. Surviving Axis tanks began to withdraw under cover of darkness at 22:35.

=== 12 July ===
The invasion convoy was 90 percent unloaded before dawn; and the 1st Infantry Division captured the Ponte Olivo airfield at 08:45, approximately 27 hours later than planned. Allied fighters successfully broke up an Axis bomber raid at 09:36 and the daily number of Axis bombing sorties was halved by the end of the day. Ships continued to provide gunfire support, and Butler fired on tanks near Ponte Olivo airfield from 11:26 to 11:35. General Patton left Monrovia at 17:00 to establish headquarters ashore. The Twelfth Air Force 27th Fighter Bomber Group landed North American A-36 Apache ground support aircraft at Ponte Olivo as soon as the airfield was declared secure for operations, and provided air support for continuing operations against German and Italian forces.
