= USS Shubrick (DD-639) =

Gleaves-class destroyer

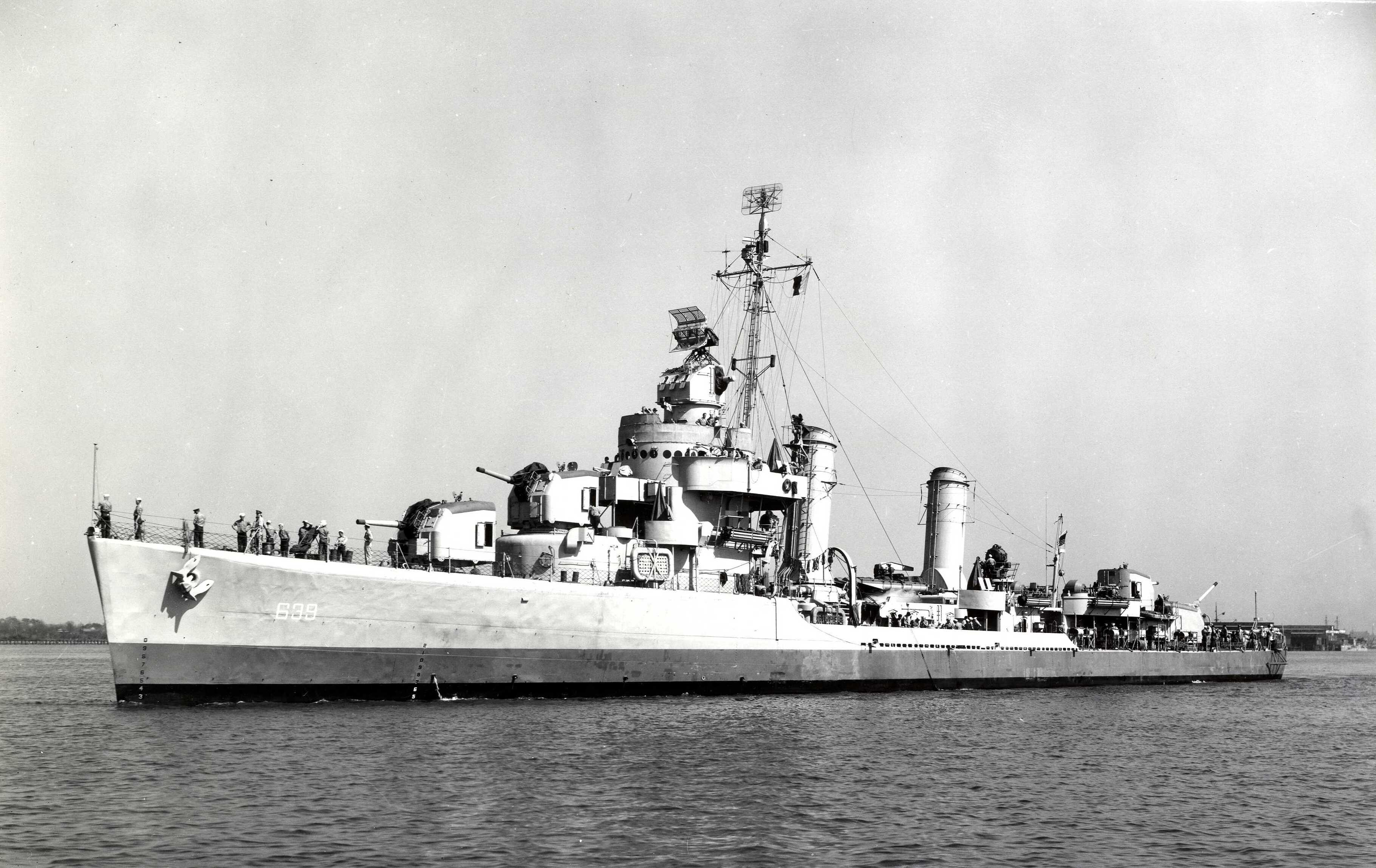
- USS Shubrick (DD-639)

History

United States
- Name: Shubrick
- Namesake: William B. Shubrick
- Builder: Norfolk Navy Yard, Portsmouth, Virginia
- Laid down: 17 February 1942
- Launched: 18 April 1942
- Commissioned: 7 February 1943
- Decommissioned: 16 November 1945
- Stricken: 28 November 1945
- Fate: Sold for scrap, 28 September 1947

General characteristics
- Class & type: Gleaves-class destroyer
- Displacement: 1,630 tons
- Length: 348 ft 3 in (106.15 m)
- Beam: 36 ft 1 in (11.00 m)
- Draft: 11 ft 10 in (3.61 m)
- Propulsion: 50,000 shp (37,000 kW); 4 boilers; 2 propellers
- Speed: 37.4 knots (69 km/h)
- Range: 6,500 nmi (12,000 km; 7,500 mi) at 12 kn (22 km/h; 14 mph)
- Complement: 16 officers, 260 enlisted
- Armament: 4 × 5 in (127 mm)/38 caliber DP guns; 4 × 40 mm (1.6 in) guns; 7 × 20 mm (0.79 in) AA guns, 5 × 21 in (533 mm) torpedo tubes (5 Mark 15 torpedoes); 6 × depth charge projectors, 2 × depth charge tracks

USS Shubrick (DD-639), a Gleaves-class destroyer, was the fourth ship of the United States Navy to be named for Rear Admiral William B. Shubrick.

Shubrick was laid down on 17 February 1942 by the Norfolk Naval Shipyard, Portsmouth, Virginia, launched on 18 April 1942, sponsored by Mrs. Grosvenor Bemis, great-great-granddaughter of R.Adm. Shubrick; and commissioned on 7 February 1943.

== Service history ==
=== Operation Husky ===
After shakedown, Shubrick sailed for North Africa with a large convoy on 8 June 1943. Reaching her destination, she prepared for Operation Husky and, on 10 July, provided fire support for the Amphibious Battle of Gela, Sicily. She engaged enemy shore batteries and broke up an enemy tank concentration, then retired to protect the transports offshore. On 11 and 12 July, she shot down two aircraft. After two trips to Bizerte and another period of shore bombardment, she escorted the cruiser Savannah to Palermo. There, during a night air raid on 4 August, Shubrick was hit amidships by a 500-pound (230 kg) bomb which caused flooding of two main machinery spaces and left the ship without power. Nine were killed and 20 wounded in the attack. The damaged destroyer was towed by Nauset into the inner harbor for emergency repairs and then to Malta for drydocking. Using one screw, the ship returned to the United States, arriving in New York on 9 October for permanent repairs.

=== Operation Overlord ===
==== Normandy ====
After completion of repairs and refresher training in January 1944, Shubrick made two convoy runs to Europe and back before joining the Normandy bombardment group in Belfast. After escorting the battleship Nevada and five cruisers to the Normandy beaches Shubrick took her own fire support station and, at 05:50 on 6 June, opened fire on her preassigned targets. She continued her fire as the troops landed, then checked her fire at 06:30 to avoid hitting friendly forces.

A third battery of German 150 mm (6 in) field cannon, part of the Maisy battery complex between Omaha and Utah landing beaches was targeted and destroyed by Shubrick on 8 June 1944. She remained off the Normandy beaches for over a month, performing escort duties, fire support missions and anti-motor torpedo boat and anti-submarine patrols, with trips to England for replenishment. On 27 June, she escorted six American PT boats to Cherbourg. There, the patrol craft reconnoitered enemy defenses by drawing their fire. Shubrick herself came under fire before the mission was completed. She left Normandy for the last time on 11 July and, five days later, joined a task group bound for the Mediterranean.

=== Operation Dragoon ===
On 12 August, Shubrick sailed from Malta with four escort carriers and five other destroyers to provide air cover for the landings in southern France on 15 August. Aside from float lights dropped on the evening after the landings, the force encountered no enemy opposition and was disbanded on 30 August. On 6 September, Shubrick sailed from Oran for overhaul in the United States.

=== Transfer to Pacific ===
After overhaul, Shubrick made a convoy trip to Taranto, Italy, and then conducted training along the east coast of the United States. On 1 February 1945, she transited the Panama Canal to join the U.S. Pacific Fleet. After additional training, she departed from Pearl Harbor on 21 April escorting the battleship Mississippi to Okinawa.

==== Okinawa, kamikaze strike ====
On 12 May, she and one other destroyer supported the landings at Tori Shima and shot down two attacking aircraft. Shubrick completed one radar picket patrol in mid-May, but, on her way to her second, she was attacked at 00:10, 29 May 1945, by two kamikaze aircraft, one of which crashed into the ship. The bomb carried by the plane blew a 30-foot (9.1 m) hole in the starboard side, and further damage was done when one of the ship's depth charges exploded. At first the situation looked grim. The destroyer Van Valkenburg came alongside at 01:13 and removed classified material and all wounded and unnecessary personnel. However, the crew finally controlled the flooding, and Shubrick was towed to Kerama Retto by ATR-9. The ship lost 35 men killed and missing, and 25 wounded in the attack.

=== Post World War II and fate ===
Shubrick underwent emergency repairs until 15 July, when she began the trip back to the United States on one engine, arriving at Puget Sound Navy Yard on 10 August. On 17 August, due to the end of the war, the Bureau of Ships decided not to repair the damage. The destroyer was decommissioned on 16 November 1945 and struck from the Navy Directory on 28 November. Later sold to the National Metal and Steel Corporation, Terminal Island, Los Angeles, for scrapping, her hulk was removed on 28 September 1947.

Shubrick received four battle stars for her World War II service.
