= USS Narragansett (AT-88) =

Tugboat of the United States Navy

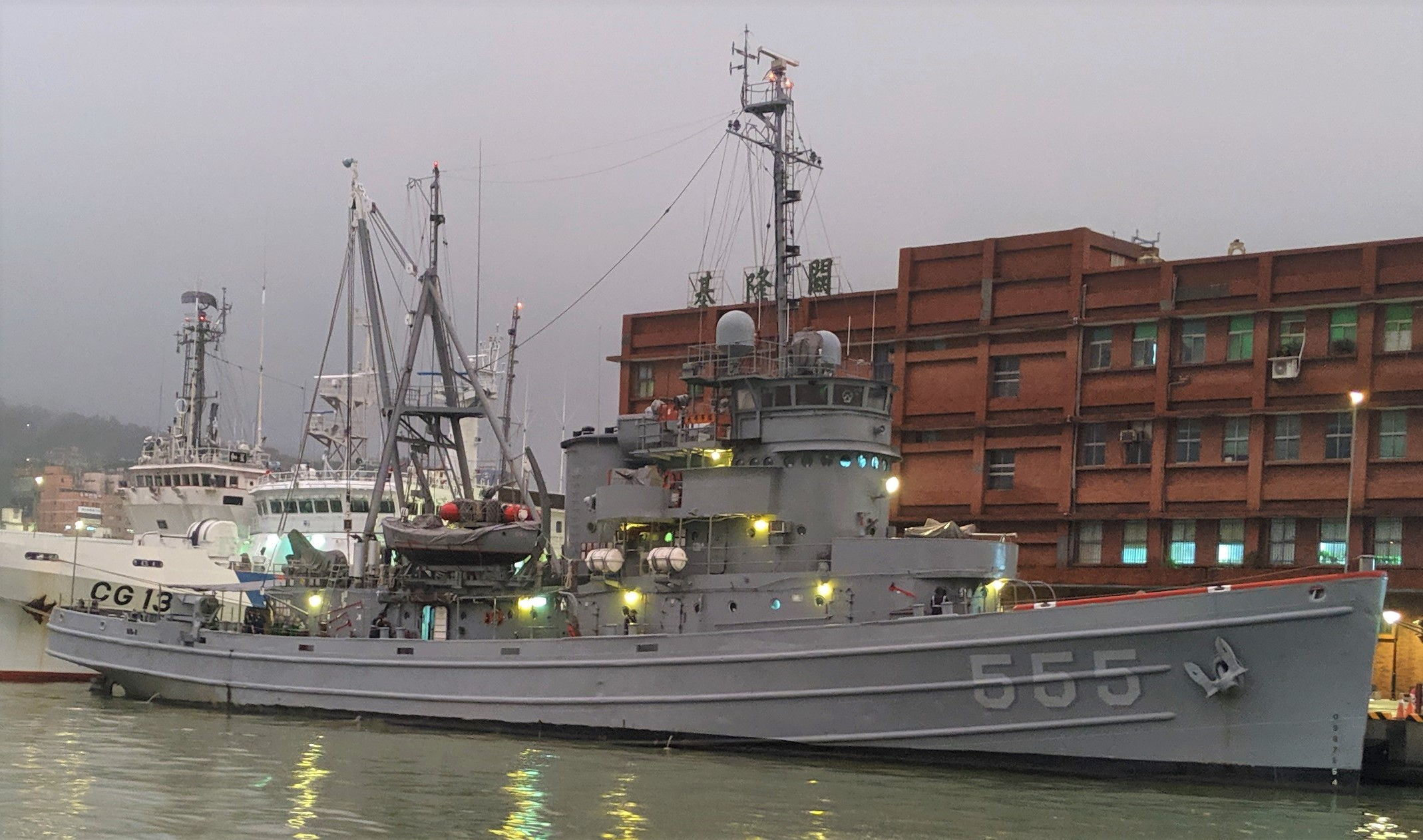
- Former USS Narragansett, ROCS Ta Feng at Keelung harbor, 28 September 2019

History

United States
- Name: USS Narragansett
- Builder: Cramp Shipbuilding Co., Philadelphia
- Yard number: 543
- Laid down: 31 January 1942
- Launched: 8 August 1942
- Commissioned: 15 January 1943
- Decommissioned: 21 December 1946
- Reclassified: ATF-88, 15 May 1944
- Stricken: 1 September 1961
- Identification: AT-88
- Honors and awards: 3 battle stars (World War II)
- Fate: Sold to Republic of China, 20 June 1991

Taiwan
- Name: ROCS Ta Feng
- Acquired: 20 June 1991
- Decommissioned: 1 Oct 2021
- Identification: ATF-555
- Fate: Sunk as target, 15 August 2023.

General characteristics
- Class & type: Navajo-class fleet tug
- Displacement: 1,235 long tons (1,255 t)
- Length: 205 ft (62 m)
- Beam: 38 ft 6 in (11.73 m)
- Draft: 15 ft 4 in (4.67 m)
- Propulsion: Diesel-electric; four General Motors 12-278A diesel main engines driving four General Electric generators and three General Motors 3-268A auxiliary services engines; single screw; 3,600 shp (2,685 kW)
- Speed: 16 knots (30 km/h; 18 mph)
- Complement: 85
- Armament: 1 × 3 in (76 mm) gun; 2 × twin 40 mm gun mounts; 2 × single 20 mm guns

USS Narragansett (AT-88) was a Navajo-class fleet tug constructed for the United States Navy during World War II. Her purpose was to aid ships, usually by towing, on the high seas or in combat or post-combat areas, plus "other duties as assigned." She served in the Atlantic Ocean and, at war's end, returned home with three battle stars to her credit.

The fourth Narragansett to be so named by the U.S. Navy, AT-88 was laid down on 31 January 1942 by the Cramp Shipbuilding Co., Philadelphia; launched on 8 August 1942, sponsored by Miss Lois Kinehen Hill, and commissioned on 15 January 1943.

== World War II Atlantic Ocean operations ==
Following shakedown of the Middle Atlantic seaboard and gunnery and anti-submarine training at Casco Bay, Narragansett departed American waters on 1 April 1943, in convoy for Gibraltar and the Mediterranean theater. Arriving at Gibraltar on the 30th, she continued on to Casablanca, thence to Algiers, arriving on 7 May to begin salvage operations along the North African coast under ComNavNAW.

== Supporting the invasion of Sicily ==
On 6 July, she was detached from those duties and ordered to Bizerte, where she prepared for "Operation Husky", the invasion of Sicily. On the 8th, she departed Bizerte, and by the 10th she was off Seaglitti with "Cent" Force as that force landed near the mouth of the Aeate River on the Camerina Plain.

Heavy tolls among the landing craft, caused by heavy surf indefinite landmarks, and inexperienced boat crews, kept the tug busy for the next weeks: at first in the Seaglitti area; then with "Joss" Force at Licata, and finally with "Dime" Force at Gela. By the end of the month she had moved her operation to Palermo, whence she operated until the end of August.

== Under attack by Luftwaffe aircraft ==
On the 10th of that month she departed Sicily to tow the disabled Mayrant (DD-402) to Malta, returning in mid-month. At 0430 on 23 August, the Luftwaffe raided Palermo, with bombs scoring on nearby service craft and a near miss wounding two of AT-88's crew. Narragansett's remaining crew immediately set to work to aid the damaged vessels despite explosions which exacted a heavy toll among the fire fighters and damage control sections. Six were dead and 12 seriously wounded before it was over.

== Supporting the invasion of Italy ==
On 30 August Narragansett returned to North Africa to stage for the invasion of Italy at Salerno. On 7 September she departed the Tunisian coast in task unit TU 85.1.1. Soon after midnight, on 9 September, she stood into the Gulf of Salerno. At 0330, the Northern Attack Force sent its assault troops onto the Unnele beaches. By 0507, Narragansett was hard at work aiding the burning Nauset (AT-89) and various landing craft and larger vessels in need of assistance. On the 14th she gained a brief respite from beachhead operations with an assignment to tow the Royal Navy cruiser HMS Uganda to Malta. Until the end of October she continued to operate in support of the Italian offensive; completing several runs to Malta towing both British and American vessels, salvaging vessels of various types and pulling landing from the beaches.

From November 1943, through to 22 February 1944, Narragansett once again operated off North Africa performing general duties at Algiers, towing targets for other vessels in the area, and performing salvage missions from Oran to Bizerte. At the end of February, she returned to Italy with a pontoon drydock in tow. and then resumed salvaging landing craft in the Naples area. During April, she performed towing services along the North African coast to Italy and to Sicily resuming in May, duties as general utility ship at Oran.

== Invasion of Southern France operations ==
On 16 June, the hard working tug, now reclassified ATF-86 (effective 15 May), again departed for Naples, this time to join in the preparations for "Operation Dragoon", the invasion of Southern France. For the next month and a half, she frequently transited the waters between Bizerte, Naples, Sardinia and Corsica, as harbors on the latter island were turned into supply stations, repair facilities and beaching craft convoy staging areas.

By 18 August she was off the Provence coast, assigned to "Delta" area, just outside the Golfe de St. Tropez. She next shifted to the more heavily defended "Carnet" area in the Golfe de Frejus. There the Germans, protecting the centuries-old invasion route to the interior along the Argens River and the only airfield and seaplane base on that coast, had mounted impressive coastal batteries along the cliffs heavily mined the waters and beaches. Kept busy in that area until the end of the month. Narragansett then moved on to Toulon and Marseille. Until mid-October she worked to clear those two harbors for the ships bringing the necessary supplies to the Allied land forces pushing inland toward the heart of the Third Reich.

== Returning Stateside for overhaul ==
Narragansett returned to Algeria on 13 October and in November departed, in convoy, for the United States. Arriving off the Carolina coast on 12 December, she entered the Charleston Navy Yard for overhaul prior to sailing for the Panama Canal and a new assignment, the Pacific Fleet.

== Transferred to the Pacific Fleet ==
On 21 January 1945 she departed for Cristobal, en route to San Francisco, California. While proceeding up the western Central American coast on 23 February, heavy seas and a 50-knot (93 km/h) wind caused the main tow line to floating dry dock ARDC-12 to part. The next day, as the ATF attempted to recover her tow the dock swerved violently hitting the tug and punching a hole, 4 feet (1.2 m) by 2 feet 6 inches (0.76 m), in the starboard side at the waterline. Effecting temporary repairs with mattresses and miscellaneous pieces of metal, she remained in the area until the ARDC was taken in tow by the Coast Guard cutter Bibb (WPG-31), after which she proceeded into Manzanillo, Mexico, for emergency repairs. On 8 March, she continued on up the coast, arriving at her new home port. Mare Island, on the 20th, to complete the job.

On 5 May, she departed for Pearl Harbor, whence she sailed, as a unit of ServRon 2, at the end of the month. After delivering U.S. Army barges and various district craft to Eniwetok, Saipan and Guam, she arrived at San Pedro Bay, Leyte on 11 July, to report for duty with ComServRon 10 for the remainder of the war and into October, she performed towing jobs in the Philippine, Marshall, Mariana, Volcano and Hawaiian Islands.

== Returned to the East Coast ==
Back at Pearl Harbor on 25 October, she sailed for the east coast, arriving at Charleston, South Carolina, to begin the new year. On active duty for only a few months, she was designated for inactivation in March 1946.

== Decommissioning and Sale ==
Decommissioned at Orange, Texas, on 21 December, she remained berthed there as a unit of the Atlantic Reserve Fleet until 1 September 1961, when she was struck from the Naval Vessel Register. Transferred to the Maritime Administration, she was berthed at Beaumont, Texas, as a unit of the National Defense Reserve Fleet into 1991. Narragansett was sold to the Republic of China (Taiwan) on 20 June 1991, where she was reactivated as Ta Feng (ATF-555).

Ta Feng was in active service until 1 October 2021, when she was decommissioned by Taiwanese Navy. She was sunk as a target on 15 August 2023.

== Awards ==
Narragansett was awarded three battle stars for her services in World War II.
