= Giovanni Randaccio =

Italian soldier

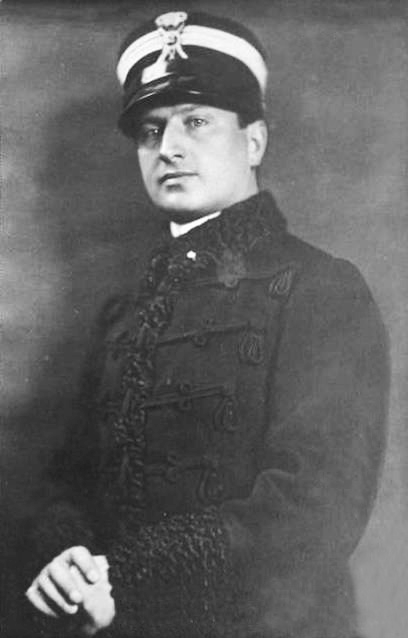
Portrait of Giovanni Randaccio, c.1915

Giovanni Randaccio (1 July 1884 in Turin – 28 May 1917 in San Giovanni al Timavo) was an Italian soldier.

== Life ==
Giovanni Randaccio was born in Turin in 1884 to a father of Sardinian origins and a mother from Vercelli. He began his military career in the infantry as a second lieutenant. He was promoted first to lieutenant, and then, on the outbreak of the First World War, captain. On 24 December 1914 he became a freemason joining the Vomere lodge in Naples.

Randaccio's war record was outstanding. He consistently displayed great courage and boldness, and was awarded many honours. He earned his first Silver Medal of Military Valor during the assault on Monte Sei Busi on 1 June 1915; and his second silver medal after the attack on the heights of (it) Polazzo on 21 October 1915. Seriously wounded, he was exempted from further service but insisted on returning to the front. In October 1916 he earned his third silver medal and a promotion to the rank of major at the taking of Veliki Kribach. Wounded once more, he again returned to the front.

Randaccio was placed in command of the 2nd battalion of the 77th Regiment of Infantry. Here he met Gabriele D'Annunzio, then working as liaison officer between the 45th Division and the 7th Infantry Division Lupi di Toscana, of which the regiment was a part. Both Randaccio and D’Annunzio, whom he commanded, took part in the Eighth and Ninth Battle of the Isonzo. A deep friendship and mutual admiration grew up between the two men.

== Death ==
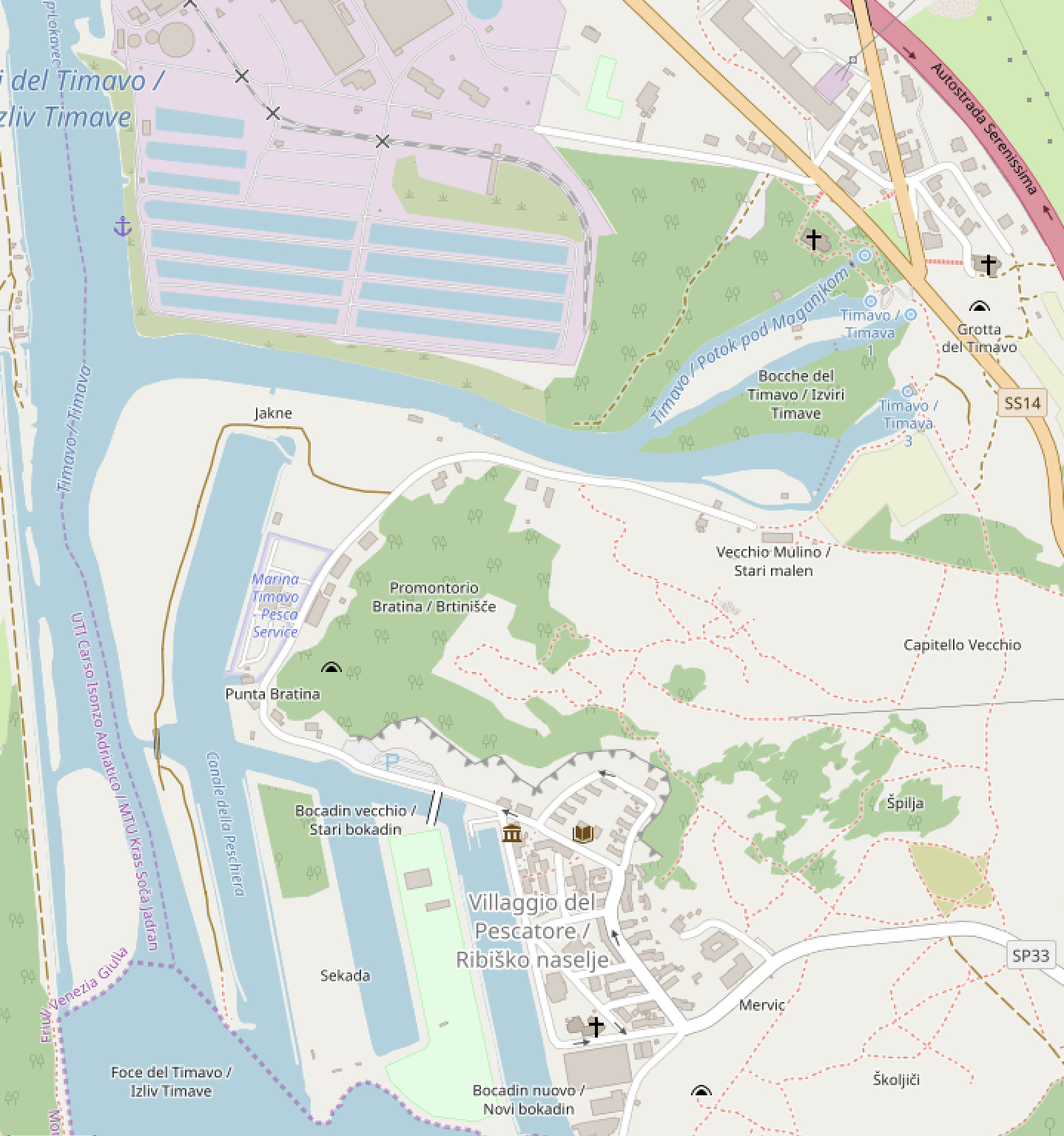
Promontorio Bratina (Quota 28)

On 27 May 1917, during the Tenth Battle of the Isonzo, Major Randaccio launched his battalion in a perilous assault on Quota 28 (‘hill 28’, on the Bratina promontory), on the other side of the Timavo river. Having taken the hill with heavy losses, Randaccio himself fell under a burst of enemy machine gun fire. He was taken to the "Scuola Popolare" in Monfalcone which was serving as a field hospital, but died soon afterwards. He was originally buried in Monfalcone on 30 May but his body was then transferred to Aquileia cathedral where a grand funeral was held for him.

There is a lack of certainty about the precise date of his death. The memorial erected on the site of the field hospital records the date of his death as 27 May. However, according to the official account of the military headquarters, the action that resulted in his death began during the night of 28 May and hill 28 was taken on the morning of the following day. Furthermore, the official citation for the award of the Gold Medal of Military Valour also refers to his death as being on 28 May. D'Annunzio himself repeatedly reported the date of Randaccio's death as the 28th, including in his diary.

== Disputed accounts ==
What became the official account of the circumstances of Randaccio's death was set out in the oration made by D'Annunzio at Randaccio's funeral, which the Duke of Aosta had printed and distributed to the soldiers of the Third Army in the interests of their 'moral preparation' as combattants. In this account, the Italians had tried for two days to force a crossing of the Timavo river, without success, before receiving orders to suspend operations. D'Annunzio then himself proposed an audacious assault on the enemy lines with the objective of moving along the coast to Duino. The intention was to raise the Italian flag from the top of the Duino castle, from where it would be visible in Trieste 21 kilometers away. This was to be a propaganda victory rather than the securing of an important military objective.

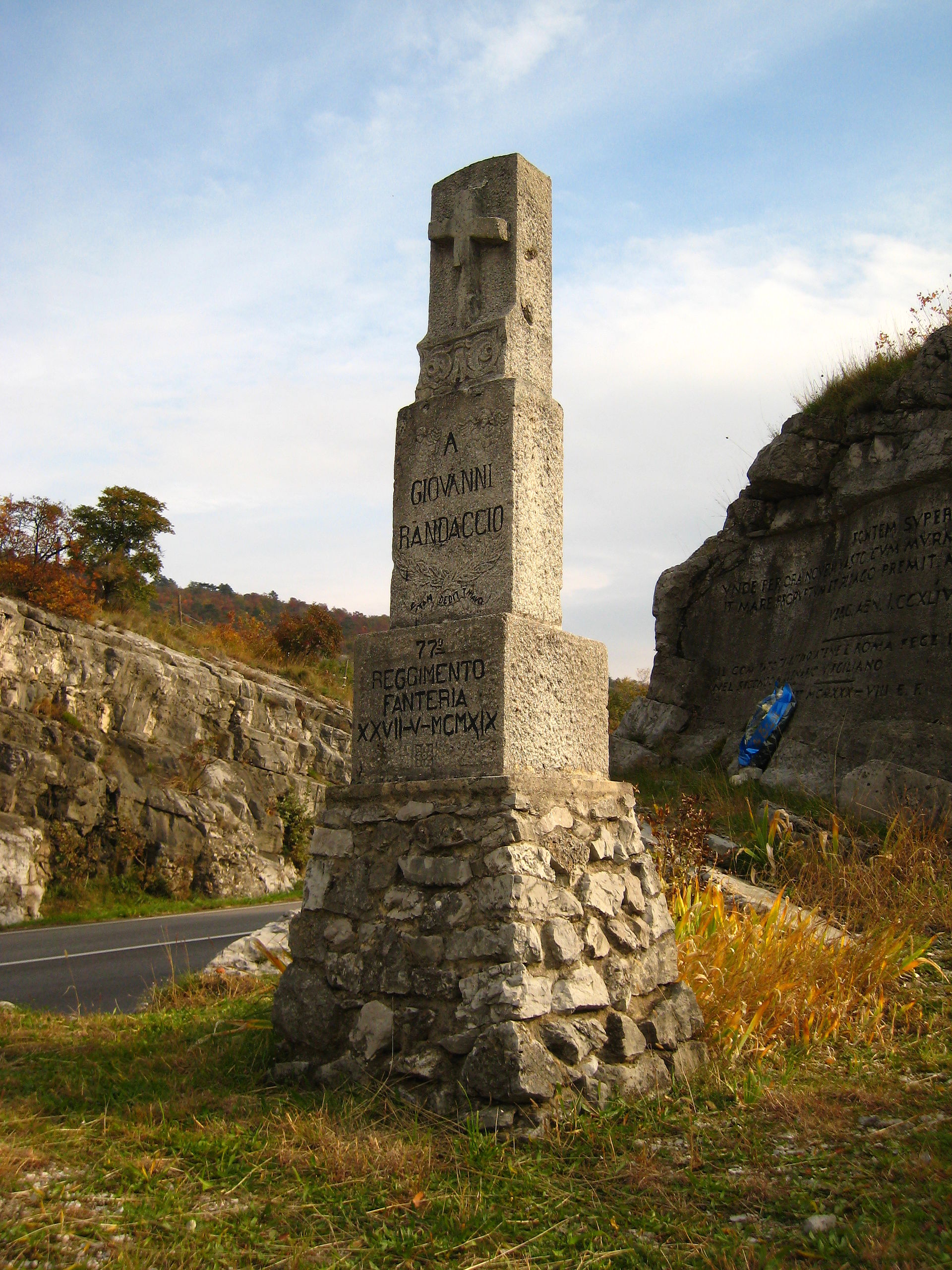
Memorial to Giovanni Randaccio at San Giovanni di Duino

To achieve this, the Italian troops needed to cross the mouth of the Timavo river on temporary catwalks made from 40 cm-wide boards, fixed to empty oil drums, and then take the Austrian batteries on the Bratina promontory. This assault began on 27 May. Despite terrible losses under enemy fire, the Italians succeeded in taking hill 28. However the Austrians brought up reinforcements and retook it, cutting off many Italian troops as they did so. At this, a number of Italian soldiers hoisted a white flag and surrendered.

According to D’Annunzio's account, Randaccio was struck by an Austrian bullet before the hill was taken. D’Annunzio was by his side, and rested his head on the folded tricolour Italian flag. Several times Randaccio asked if the hill had been taken, as D’Annunzio lied, telling him that it had because, as he said, “a hero cannot do other than die victorious.” According to D’Annunzio, as he lay dying Randaccio begged D’Annunzio to give him the poison capsule that the poet, he knew, always carried with him in battle. Three times he asked for it and three times D’Annunzio refused because, as he explained in his funeral oration: "It was necessary for him to suffer so that his life could become sublime in the immortality of death".

However, according to the account included in the official citation for his gold medal, he succeeded in taking the hill but was shot soon afterwards. According to other accounts, having taken and lost at the hill, Randaccio showed great bravery in leading his men in retreat, ensuring that they made their way back to the river, where they threw themselves in the water and swam back across. While escorting the last of them off the promontory, Randaccio was struck by enemy fire. Orderlies carried him towards safety on a stretcher under fire, but he was struck by a second bullet, and they dropped him and fled. He was eventually brought to safety but did not survive long.

Exactly what role D’Annunzio played during the last hours of his friend”s life is difficult to determine. While his own account may give the impression that they were together on the front line, D’Annunzio never crossed the river himself, remaining on the west bank throughout the fighting. According to some accounts, D’Annunzio was so enraged at the retreat from hill 28 that he ordered the Italian artillery to open fire on its own men as they struggled to get back across the Timavo.

According to Guido Agosti (see bibliography) Randaccio himself never crossed the river either, observing the advance from the west bank, throwing himself onto the catwalk to assist his retreating men and being mortally wounded there.

To add to the uncertainty, the stele memorialising Randaccio's death has been moved. It was originally placed on the west bank of the Timavo, near a footbridge, in 1919. However it now lies at San Giovanni di Duino alongside the SS14 road, under the monument to the Wolves of Tuscany, where it was moved following the industrialization of the Lisert district. At least one authority suggests that the move dates to 1932; however the 1949 Duino sheet of the Military Geographic Institute shows the "Cippo Randaccio" still in its original position, on the west bank.

== Legacy ==
Randaccio became a central figure in D’Annunzio's hero mythology, as a martyr and sacrificial victim. The flag on which D’Annunzio had first rested his head and later wrapped his body was used to cover his coffin at his funeral; it was to become a key symbolic object during the Italian Regency of Carnaro and D’Annunzio later kept it at his home, Vittoriale degli Italiani.

There are many streets and schools in Italy named after Randaccio. There is also a piazza Giovanni Randaccio in Rome.

== Bibliography ==
- Comando del Corpo di Stato Maggiore, Riassunti storici dei corpi e comandi nella guerra 1915-1918 – Fanteria - Vol.2, Roma, Edizioni Ufficio Storico, 1928.
- Ministero della Guerra - Comando del Corpo di Stato Maggiore, ufficio storico, "L'Esercito Italiano nella Grande Guerra", Vol. IV Tomo I, Le Operazioni del 1917 (da gennaio a maggio), Roma, 1940
- Österreich-Ungarns Letzter Krieg 1914-1918, Vienna, 1930
- Saverio Laredo de Mendoza, Gabriele D'Annunzio fante del Veliki e del Faiti, Milano, Impresa Editoriale Italiana, 1932.
- Gruppo Medaglie d'Oro al valor militare d'Italia, Le Medaglie d'Oro al valor militare, Roma, 1965.
- Enrico Morali, "In guerra coi Lupi di Toscana", Itinera Progetti, Bassano del Grappa (VI), 2010.
- Abramo Schmid, "La mancata conquista di Quota 28 del Timavo nel 1917", articolo inserito nella pubblicazione "Bisiacaria" del 1991.
- Mitja Juren, Nicola Persegati, Paolo Pizzamus, "Flondar 1917", Gaspari Editore, Udine, 2017.
- Angelo Gatti, "Caporetto", Il Mulino, Bologna, 1964.
- Augusto Vanzo, "In guerra con la Terza Armata", Itinera Progetti, Bassano del Grappa (VI), 2017
- Dario Marini de Canedolo, "Ermada", Gruppo Speleologico Flondar, Villaggio del Pescatore (Duino Aurisina), 2007.
- Dario Marini de Canedolo, Valentina Degrassi, Alice Sattolo, "Il Carso del Villaggio San Marco di Duino", Gruppo Speleologico Flondar, Villaggio del Pescatore (Duino Aurisina), 2014
- Guido Agosti, "Con i lupi del 77º Fanteria", Giulio Vanini Editore, Brescia, 1934.
- Carmela Timeus, "Attendiamo le navi", Licinio Cappelli Editore, Bologna, 1934.
- Gabriele D'Annunzio, "Sulla tomba di un eroe del Carso", Corriere della Sera, 7 giugno 1917.
- Gabriele D'Annunzio, "Per l'Italia degli Italiani", Milano, 1923.
- Luccio Formisano, "La Battaglia del Timavo 23-28 maggio 1917", Ed. Tipografia Sociale, Trieste, 1930.
