= 33rd Infantry Regiment "Livorno" =

Inactive Italian Army infantry unit

- 33° Reggimento Fanteria "Livorno"
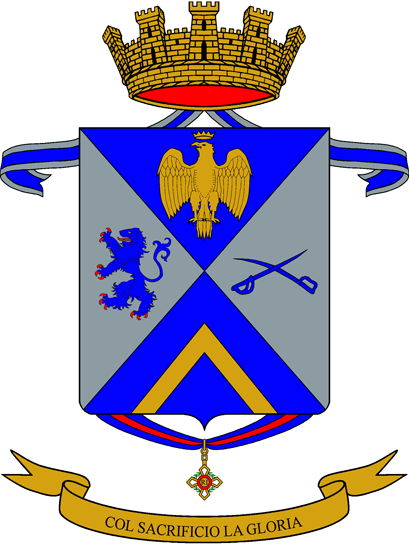
- Regimental coat of arms
- Active: 5 May 1859 – 7 Nov. 1917; 22 Nov. 1917 – 9 Sept. 1943; 1 Oct. 1976 – 30 Nov. 1991
- Country: Italy
- Branch: Italian Army
- Part of: Mechanized Brigade "Brescia"
- Garrison/HQ: Fogliano Redipuglia
- Motto: "Col sacrificio la gloria"
- Anniversaries: 23 August 1917 – Battle of Bainsizza
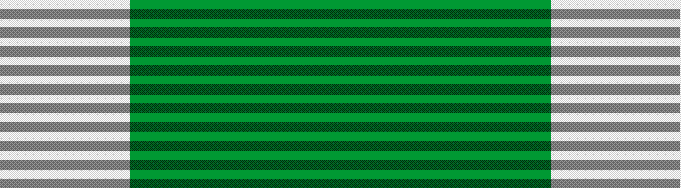
- Decorations: 1× Military Order of Italy; 2× Silver Medals of Military Valor; 1× Silver Medal of Merit

Insignia
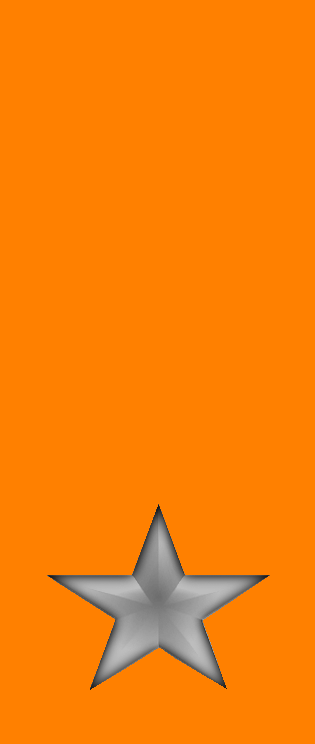
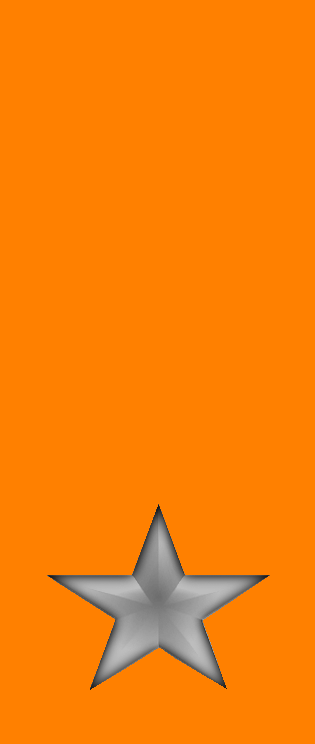
- Regimental gorget patches

The 33rd Infantry Regiment "Livorno" (Italian: 33° Reggimento Fanteria "Livorno") is an inactive unit of the Italian Army last based in Fogliano Redipuglia. The regiment is named for the city of Livorno and part of the Italian Army's infantry arm. The regiment was one of five line infantry regiments formed by the Provisional Government of Tuscany on 5 May 1859 during the Second Italian War of Independence. In 1860, the regiment joined the Royal Sardinian Army. In 1866, the 33rd Infantry Regiment participated in the Third Italian War of Independence. In World War I the regiment fought on the Italian front.

During World War II, the regiment was assigned to the 4th Infantry Division "Livorno", with which it fought in 1940 in the Italian invasion of France. In 1942, the "Livorno" division was sent to Sicily, where the division and its regiments suffered heavy losses during the allied Operation Husky in July 1943. The remnants of the division returned to their bases in Piedmont, where the division was disbanded by invading German forces after the announcement of the Armistice of Cassibile on 8 September 1943.

In 1976, the regiment's flag and traditions were assigned to the 33rd Infantry Fortification Battalion "Ardenza", which was assigned to the Mechanized Brigade "Gorizia". In 1991, the battalion was disbanded and the flag of the 33rd Infantry Regiment "Livorno" transferred to the Shrine of the Flags in the Vittoriano in Rome. The regiment's anniversary falls on 23 August 1917, the day during the Eleventh Battle of the Isonzo the two regiments of the Brigade "Livorno" conquered important Austro-Hungarian positions on the Banjšice plateau, for which the two regiments were awarded a Silver Medal of Military Valor.

== History ==
=== Formation ===
On 21 July 1858, French Emperor Napoleon III and the Prime Minister of Sardinia Camillo Benso, Count of Cavour met in Plombières and reached a secret verbal agreement on a military alliance between the Second French Empire and the Kingdom of Sardinia against the Austrian Empire. On 26 January 1859, Napoleon III signed the Franco-Sardinian Treaty, followed by King Victor Emmanuel II on 29 January 1859. On 9 March 1859, Sardinia mobilized its army, followed by Austria on 9 April. On 23 April, Austria delivered an ultimatum to Sardinia demanding its demobilization. Upon Sardinia's refusal, Austria declared war on 26 April and three days later the Austrians crossed the Ticino river into Piedmont. Consequently, France honored its alliance with Sardinia and declared war on Austria on 3 May 1859.

On 27 April 1859, Leopold II, Grand Duke of Tuscany refused popular demands to join the war against Austria, which led to an uprising in Florence, the capital of the Grand Duchy of Tuscany. As the Tuscan Army sided with the people, Leopold II fled the same day to the Austrian garrison in Bologna in the Papal Legations of the Romagne. The evening of the same day, 27 April 1859, the city council of Florence formed the Provisional Government of Tuscany, which was led by Ubaldino Peruzzi, Vincenzo Malenchini, and Alessandro Danzini. The next day Victor Emmanuel II nominated the Sardinian ambassador in Florence Carlo Bon Compagni di Mombello as new head of state of the Grand Duchy.

On 5 May 1859, the Provisional Government of Tuscany issued a decree to reorganize the infantry of the Army of the Grand Duchy of Tuscany. At the time the Tuscan infantry consisted of ten line infantry battalions and the Velites Battalion, which fielded grenadier troops. Consequently, five line regiments and one grenadier regiment were formed:

- Grenadier Regiment, formed by the Velites Battalion and other units
- 1st Line Regiment, formed by the VII Line Battalion and IX Line Battalion
- 2nd Line Regiment, formed by the V Line Battalion and X Line Battalion
- 3rd Line Regiment, formed by the VI Line Battalion and VIII Line Battalion
- 4th Line Regiment, formed by the I Line Battalion and III Line Battalion
- 5th Line Regiment, formed by the II Line Battalion and IV Line Battalion

On 23 May 1859, the 5th French Corps landed in Livorno and on 29 May the Grand Duchy of Tuscany joined the Franco-Sardinian alliance against Austria. On 18 June 1859, three volunteer battalions were used to form the 1st Jäger Regiment. On 2 July 1859, the 1st and 2nd line regiments, and the 3rd and 4th line regiments were grouped into two brigades. On 12 July 1859, the Second Italian War of Independence ended with the Armistice of Villafranca, which called for the rulers of the Grand Duchy of Tuscany, the Duchy of Modena and Reggio, and the Duchy of Parma and Piacenza, which all had fled their nations, to be restored to their thrones. However neither Sardinia nor the Sardinian installed governments in the three nations wished for a return of the rulers.

On 23 October 1859, the 1st Jäger Regiment was reorganized as 6th Line Regiment and grouped, together with the 5th Line Regiment, in a newly formed brigade. On 4 November 1859, the brigade, which consisted of the 1st and 2nd line regiments, was renamed Brigade "Pisa", while the brigade, which consisted of the 3rd and 4th line regiments, was renamed Brigade "Siena". On the same date, the brigade, which consisted of the 5th and 6th line regiments, was renamed Brigade "Livorno". On 30 December 1859, the Tuscan regiments took their place in the progressive numerical order of the regiments of the Royal Sardinian Army and were renumbered as follows:

- Brigade "Pisa"
  - 1st Line Regiment – 29th Infantry Regiment (Brigade "Pisa")
  - 2nd Line Regiment – 30th Infantry Regiment (Brigade "Pisa")
- Brigade "Siena"
  - 3rd Line Regiment – 31st Infantry Regiment (Brigade "Siena")
  - 4th Line Regiment – 32nd Infantry Regiment (Brigade "Siena")
- Brigade "Livorno"
  - 5th Line Regiment – 33rd Infantry Regiment (Brigade "Livorno")
  - 6th Line Regiment – 34th Infantry Regiment (Brigade "Livorno")

At the same time it was decided to form a fourth Tuscan brigade, which would consist of the 35th and 36th infantry regiments. On 17 January 1860, the 35th Infantry Regiment was formed in Livorno by reorganizing the Grenadier Regiment, which on the same date received the I Battalion of the 32nd Infantry Regiment (Brigade "Siena"). The following 27 January, the 36th Infantry Regiment was formed in Florence, which received the II Battalion of the former Grenadier Regiment and the III Battalion of the 31st Infantry Regiment (Brigade "Siena"). On the same date, 27 January 1860, the two new regiments were assigned to the newly formed Brigade "Pistoia". On 11 and 12 March 1860, the Royal Provinces of Emilia and the Grand Duchy of Tuscany voted in a plebiscite for annexation by the Kingdom of Sardinia. On 18 March 1860, the annexation act was presented to Victor Emmanuel II and one week later, on 25 March 1860, the four Tuscan brigades were formally incorporated into the Royal Sardinian Army.

=== Third Italian War of Independence ===
On 1 August 1862, the 33rd Infantry Regiment (Brigade "Livorno") ceded its 17th Company and 18th Company to help form the 72nd Infantry Regiment (Brigade "Puglie"), and one of its depot companies to help form the 64th Infantry Regiment (Brigade "Cagliari"). In 1866, the Brigade "Livorno" participated in the Third Italian War of Independence, during which the brigade fought in the Battle of Custoza. On 25 October 1871, the brigade level was abolished, and the two regiments of the Brigade "Livorno" were renamed 33rd Infantry Regiment "Livorno", respectively 34th Infantry Regiment "Livorno". On 2 January 1881, the brigade level was reintroduced, and the two regiments were renamed again as 33rd Infantry Regiment (Brigade "Livorno") and 34th Infantry Regiment (Brigade "Livorno").

On 1 November 1884, the 30th Infantry Regiment ceded some of its companies to help form the 91st Infantry Regiment (Brigade "Basilicata"). In 1887–88 the regiment's 2nd Company deployed to Massawa for the Italo-Ethiopian War of 1887–1889, which led to the establishment of the Italian colony of Eritrea. In 1895–96, the regiment provided nine officers and 269 enlisted for units deployed to Italian Eritrea for the First Italo-Ethiopian War.

In 1903–04, the regiment's 4th Company was sent to Tianjin in China to garrison the Italian concession of Tianjin, which had been ceded by China to Italy after the Eight-Nation Alliance's intervention in China during the Boxer Rebellion. In December 1908, the regiment was deployed to the area of the Strait of Messina for the recovery efforts after the 1908 Messina earthquake. For its service the regiment was awarded a Silver Medal of Merit, which was affixed to the regiment's flag. In 1911–12, the regiment provided 28 officers and 1,421 enlisted for units deployed to Libya for the Italo-Turkish War.

=== World War I ===
At the outbreak of World War I, the Brigade "Livorno" formed, together with the Brigade "Lombardia" and the 26th Field Artillery Regiment, the 4th Division. At the time the 33rd Infantry Regiment consisted of three battalions, each of which fielded four fusilier companies and one machine gun section. On 1 March 1915, the depot of the 33rd Infantry Regiment in Cuneo formed the regimental command and I Battalion of the 157th Infantry Regiment, which was assigned on the same day to the newly formed Brigade "Liguria". After Italy's entry into the war on 23 May 1915, the Brigade "Livorno" attacked towards Oslavia. During the First Battle of the Isonzo, Second Battle of the Isonzo, and Third Battle of the Isonzo the brigade attacked Austro-Hungarian positions on the Sabotin hill overlooking Gorizia and at again positions at Oslavia. On 10 November 1915, the first day of the Fourth Battle of the Isonzo, the brigade's 33rd Infantry Regiment attacked Height 188 at Oslavia, while the 34th Infantry Regiment attacked Height 609 on the Sabotin. After the first attack was repulsed the 33rd Infantry Regiment attacked again on 11, 12, 13, 18, 19, and 20 November, which finally led to the capture of Height 188. By then the brigade had suffered almost 3,000 casualties in its attacks at Oslavia and on the Sabotin, and was taken out of the line.On 10 December 1915, the depot of the 33rd Infantry Regiment formed the 204th Infantry Regiment, which on 11 March 1916 was assigned to the newly formed Brigade "Tanaro".

At the end of January 1916, the brigade was sent to the calm Giudicarie sector, where the brigade deployed in the valley of Daone om 7 March. The brigade remained in the Giudicarie until 4 November 1916, when it was sent to the Karst plateau to replace units that had suffered heavy casualties during the Ninth Battle of the Isonzo. In May 1917, during the Tenth Battle of the Isonzo, part of the 33rd Infantry Regiment was attached to the Brigade "Palermo" for an attack towards the summit of Sveta Gora. The brigade was then sent to the Banjšice plateau, where it fought in August 1917 in the Eleventh Battle of the Isonzo. On 21 August 1917, the Brigade "Livorno" attacked the first Austro-Hungarian trench line and by 27 August the brigade had fought its way across the Banjšice plateau, most of which was now in Italian hands.

The brigade remained on the Banjšice plateau until the Battle of Caporetto forced the Italians to retreat behind the Piave river. One day after the Austro-Hungarian and German breakthrough at Caporetto the brigade was ordered to fall back to Vrhovlje pri Kojskem, where the next day, on 26 October 1917, the brigade was attacked by advancing enemy troops. The brigade now began a fighting retreat towards the Tagliamento river, clashing every day with enemy units, until the brigade crossed the Tagliamento at Madrisio on the 31 October. On 6 November 1917, the remnants of the brigade, which had lost more than 2,500 men during the retreat, arrived in Volpago behind the new Piave front. The next day, on 7 November 1917, the brigade and its regiments were disbanded due to the losses the brigade had suffered.

On 22 November 1917, the Brigade "Livorno" and its two regiments were reformed with troops taken from reserve and depot units. On 13 December 1917, the brigade was entered the front on the Asiago plateau from Portecche to Bertigo and on to Monte Valbella. On 23 December 1917, the Austro-Hungarian troops attacked the brigade's positions at Portecche and on the Monte Valbella, but the brigade defeated the attack at the cost of 1,100 casualties. On 26 December 1917, the brigade was taken out of the front and sent to the rear.

On 8 May 1918, the brigade ordered to man the first line in the Brenta valley, which run from the valley floor to the Col Moschin. On 15 June 1918, Austro-Hungarian troops began the Second Battle of the Piave River and attacked the Brigade "Livorno" in strength and took the summit of Col Moschin. The next day, on 16 June, the IX Assault Unit retook Col Moschin, which stabilized the front of the Brigade "Livorno". During the decisive Battle of Vittorio Veneto the brigade was part of the reserve and did not see further action before the Armistice of Villa Giusti was signed.

For their conduct and bravery during the war, especially at Oslavia and on the Sabotin in 1915 and then on the Banjšice plateau in 1917, the two regiments of the Brigade "Livorno" were both awarded a Silver Medal of Military Valor. The medals were affixed to the regiments' flags and added to their coat of arms.

=== Interwar years ===
In April 1919, the Brigade "Livorno" was assigned to the Royal Italian Army's Expeditionary Force in the Eastern Mediterranean, which on 29 April 1919 occupied Antalya, and on 11 May 1919 Fethiye, Bodrum and Marmaris in Anatolia. Italy claimed the area as its sphere of influence as per the Agreement of Saint-Jean-de-Maurienne, which partitioned the Ottoman Empire. One battalion of the 136th Infantry Regiment (Brigade "Campania") was also sent to occupy Konya. The Treaty of Sèvres confirmed an Italian zone of influence in the area and the Italian occupation of Antalya continued until October 1922 when Italy removed its troops from Anatolia.

On 1 October 1926, the Brigade "Livorno" was renamed IV Infantry Brigade. The brigade was the infantry component of the 4th Territorial Division of Cuneo, which also included the 28th Field Artillery Regiment. On the same day the brigade's two infantry regiments were renamed 33rd Infantry Regiment "Livorno" and 34th Infantry Regiment "Livorno". On 10 October 1926, the command of the Brigade "Ravenna" was disbanded and the brigade's 38th Infantry Regiment "Ravenna" was transferred to the IV Infantry Brigade. On 18 October 1926, the 72nd Infantry Regiment "Puglie" was disbanded and its two battalions were transferred to the 33rd Infantry Regiment "Livorno" and 34th Infantry Regiment "Livorno". In 1930, the IV Infantry Brigade transferred the 38th Infantry Regiment "Ravenna" to the III Infantry Brigade, which in turn ceded the 44th Infantry Regiment "Forlì" to the IV Infantry Brigade.

In 1934, the 4th Territorial Division of Cuneo changed its name to 4th Infantry Division "Monviso". A name change that also extended to the division's infantry brigade. On 31 March 1939, the division ceded the 44th Infantry Regiment "Forlì" to the newly formed 36th Infantry Division "Forlì". On 5 April of the same year, the IV Infantry Brigade "Monviso" was disbanded and its infantry regiments came under direct command of the division, which was renamed 4th Infantry Division "Livorno".

=== World War II ===
At the outbreak of World War II, the 33rd Infantry Regiment "Livorno" consisted of a command, a command company, three fusilier battalions, a support weapons battery equipped with 65/17 infantry support guns, and a mortar company equipped with 81mm Mod. 35 mortars. In June 1940, the "Livorno" division participated in the Italian invasion of France near the Lausfer pass. On 15 June 1940, the division crossed the border and captured the Collalunga pass. On 23 June 1940, after a day-long assault, the division broke through the French lines and reached Saint-Honorat in La Bollène-Vésubie commune. There was no further advance until the Franco-Italian Armistice came into effect on 25 June 1940.

In 1942, the Livorno" division was deployed to Sicily and took up positions in the area of Caltanissetta, San Cataldo, Aragona, Raffadali, and Serradifalco as the 6th Army's mobile reserve. On 10 July 1943, Allied forces landed in Sicily and the "Livorno" division carried out a counterattack at Gela, which almost succeed to throw the allies back into the sea. The division regrouped and made a second attempt to retake Gela two days later, but on 15 July 1943, Allied armored attacked from west between Valguarnera Caropepe and Raddusa threatened to encircle the division. On 18 July 1943, Raddusa was lost and the division took a stand along the Simeto river to the South of Catania. Allied advances forced the division to retreat through Agira and Regalbuto. On 30 July 1943, the remnants of division were sent to Castroreale to reorganize, but due to a lack of supplies, the division was evacuated to the mainland Italy instead. On 1 August 1943, the division reached Messina. From 1–14 August 1943, the division's remaining troops were ferried to Calabria. Of the division's initial strength of 13,000 troops, only 4,200 troops made it to the mainland. In early September 1943, the division returned to its depots in Piedmont. After the announcement of the Armistice of Cassibile on 8 September 1943 the division was disbanded by the invading German forces on 9 September 1943.

For their conduct and bravery during Operation Husky in Sicily the two infantry regiments and the artillery regiment of the "Livorno" division, were awarded a Silver Medal of Military Valor. The medals were affixed to the regiments' flags and added to their coat of arms.

=== Cold War ===
During the 1975 army reform, the army disbanded the regimental level and newly independent battalions were granted for the first time their own flags. On 30 September 1976, the 53rd Infantry Fortification Regiment "Umbria" was disbanded and the next day the regiment's III Battalion in Fogliano Redipuglia became an autonomous unit and was renamed 33rd Infantry Fortification Battalion "Ardenza". The battalion was renamed Ardenza, a quarter of the city of Livorno, as the name "Livorno" was already assigned to the 28th Field Artillery Group "Livorno". The battalion was assigned to the Mechanized Brigade "Gorizia" and consisted of a command, a command and services company, and a varying number of fortification companies and maintenance squads, which were partly detached to Perteole. The battalion was tasked with manning fortifications of the Alpine Wall on the Karst plateau, and on the Western banks of the Soča and Torre from the area of their confluence to the Adriatic Sea.

On 12 November 1976, the President of the Italian Republic Giovanni Leone assigned with decree 846 the flag and traditions of the 33rd Infantry Regiment "Livorno" to the 33rd Infantry Fortification Battalion "Ardenza".

On 31 October 1986, the 53rd Infantry Fortification Battalion "Umbria" was assigned to the Mechanized Brigade "Gorizia", which in turn transferred the 33rd Infantry Fortification Battalion "Ardenza" to the Mechanized Brigade "Vittorio Veneto".

=== Recent times ===
After the end of the Cold War Italian Army began to draw down its forces and on 30 November 1991, the 33rd Infantry Fortification Battalion "Ardenza" was disbanded and the following 5 December the flag of the 33rd Infantry Regiment "Livorno" transferred to the Shrine of the Flags in the Vittoriano in Rome.
