= 18th Infantry Division "Messina" =

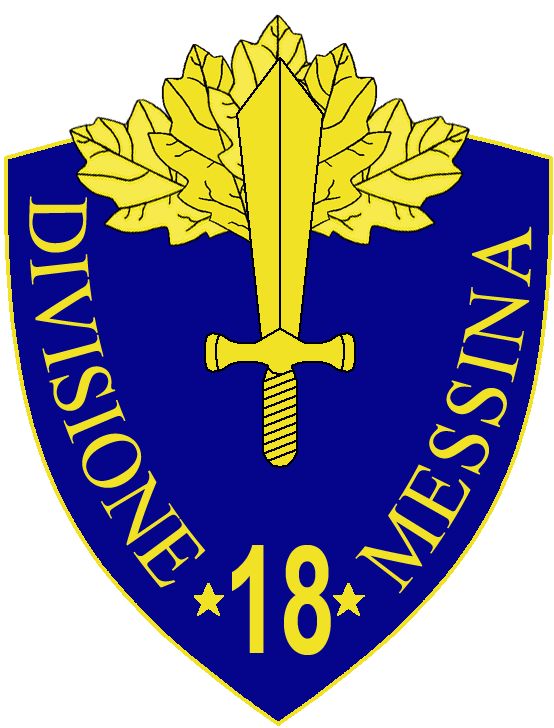
- 18th Infantry Division "Messina" insignia
- Active: 1937–1943
- Country: Kingdom of Italy
- Branch: Royal Italian Army
- Type: Infantry
- Size: Division
- Garrison/HQ: Ancona
- Engagements: World War II

Commanders
- Notable commanders: General Guglielmo Spicacci

Insignia
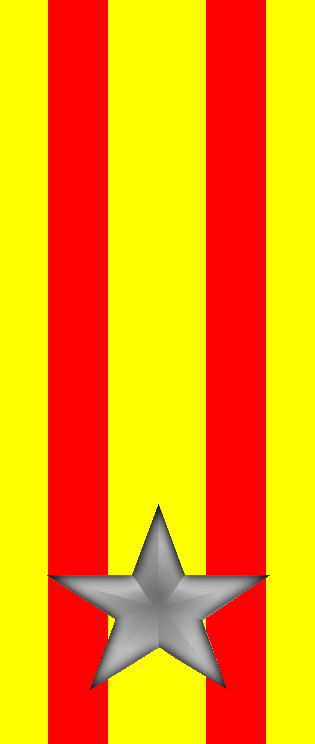
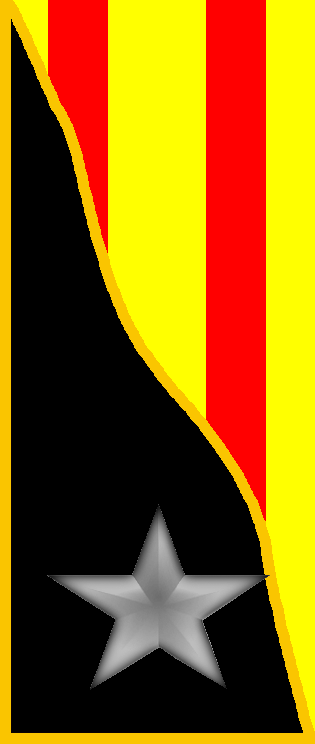
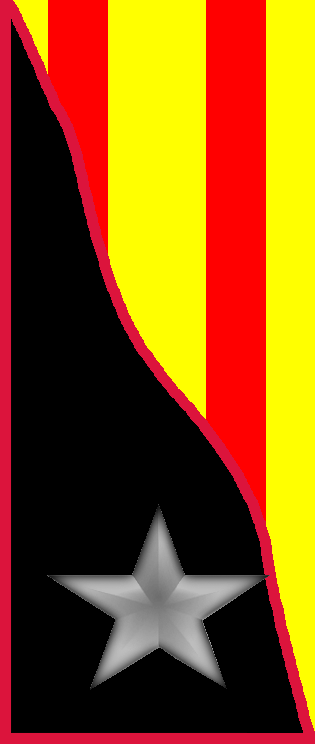
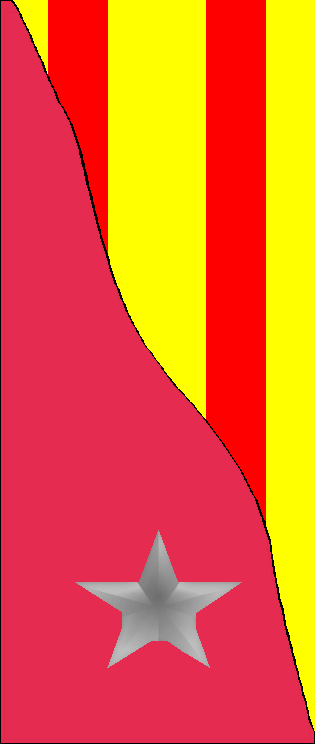
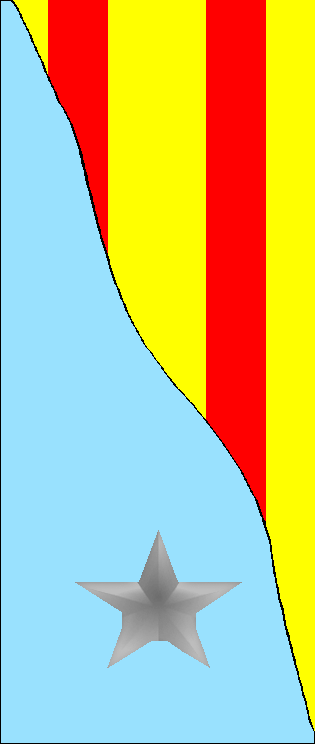
- Identification symbol: Messina Division gorget patches

The 18th Infantry Division "Messina" (Italian: 18ª Divisione di fanteria "Messina") was an infantry division of the Royal Italian Army during World War II. The Messina was named for the city of Messina and based primarily in the Marche region, where it also recruited most of its troops. The division's headquarter and 93rd Infantry Regiment were based in Ancona, the 94th Infantry Regiment in Fano, and the 2nd Artillery Regiment in Pesaro.

== History ==
The division's lineage begins with the Brigade "Messina" established in Gaeta on 1 November 1884 with the 93rd and 94th infantry regiments.

=== World War I ===
The brigade fought on the Italian front in World War I. On 30 September 1926 the brigade assumed the name of XVIII Infantry Brigade and on 6 November of the same year received the 157th Infantry Regiment "Liguria" from the disbanded Brigade "Liguria". The brigade was the infantry component of the 18th Territorial Division of Ancona, which also included the 2nd Artillery Regiment. In 1934 the division changed its name to 18th Infantry Division "Metauro".

=== Second Italo-Ethiopian War ===
In preparation for the Second Italo-Ethiopian War the division was mobilized on 27 September 1935 with the 93rd and 157th infantry regiments and the 2nd Artillery Regiment and shipped to Libya. On 15 November the division returned to its base in Ancona and demobilized. From 1 October 1935 to 15 November 1936, while the Metauro division was in Africa, the division's depots continued to train conscrips, who were used to temporarily reform the 49th Artillery Regiment, which was assigned to the temporarily formed 118th Infantry Division "Metauro II". The Metauro II also included the Metauro division's 94th Infantry Regiment "Messina" and the 61st Infantry Regiment "Sicilia", which had been transferred from the 8th Infantry Division "Po" that had deployed overseas for the war. In January 1936, the 49th Artillery Regiment was sent to Eritrea, where it joined the 26th Infantry Division "Assietta" for the war. After the 18th Infantry Division "Metauro" and 49th Artillery Regiment returned from Ethiopia the 118th Infantry Division "Metauro II" and the 49th Artillery Regiment were disbanded and the regiment's personnel was transferred to the returning 2nd Artillery Regiment. At the same time the 61st Infantry Regiment "Sicilia" returned to the 8th Infantry Division "Po".

In October 1937, the 157th Infantry Regiment "Liguria" left the division and moved to Libya to join the 63rd Infantry Division "Cirene". On 1 March 1938 the division raised the 226th Infantry Regiment "Arezzo" in Macerata as replacement for the 157th Infantry Regiment "Liguria".

=== World War II ===
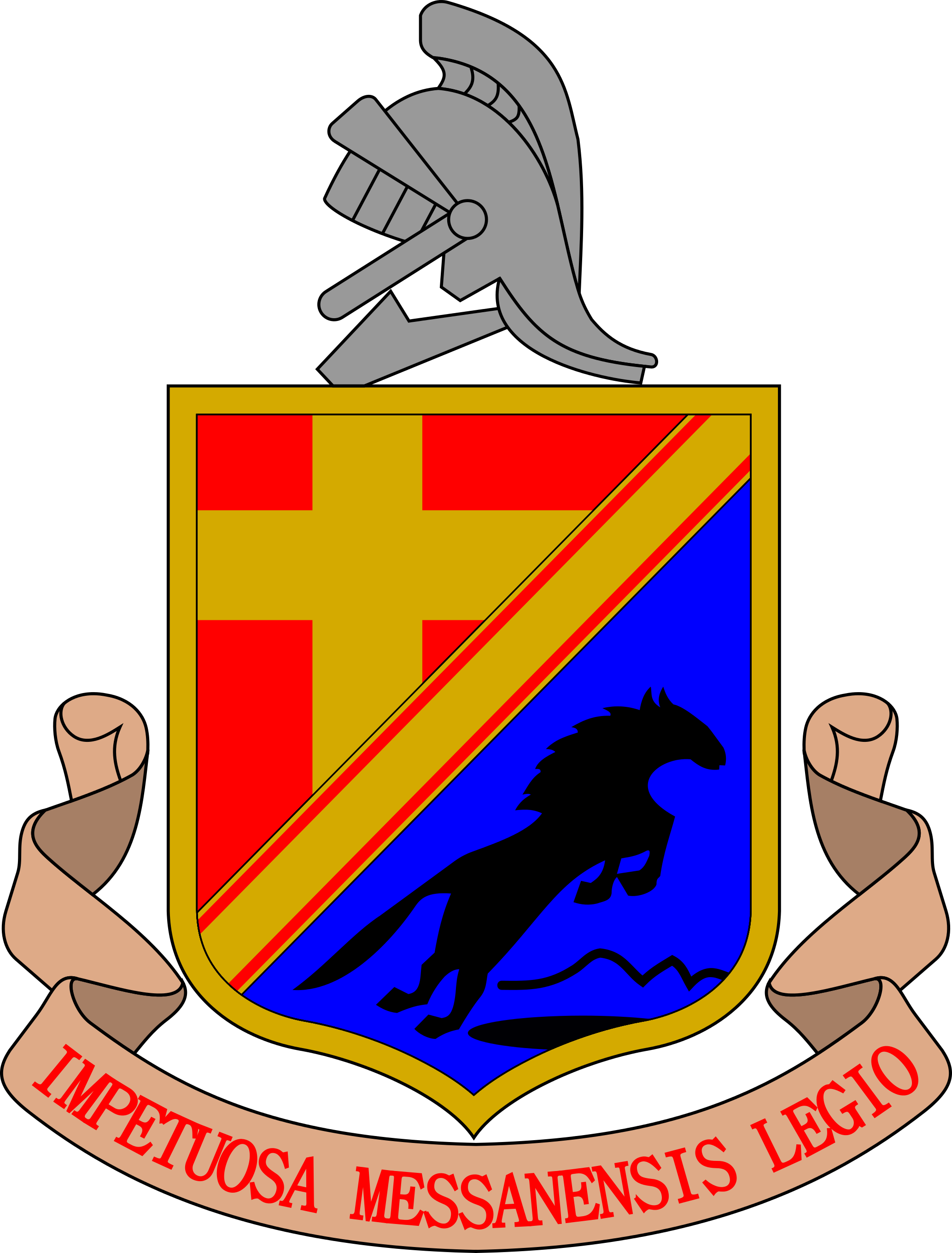
Coat of Arms of the 93rd Infantry Regiment "Messina", 1939

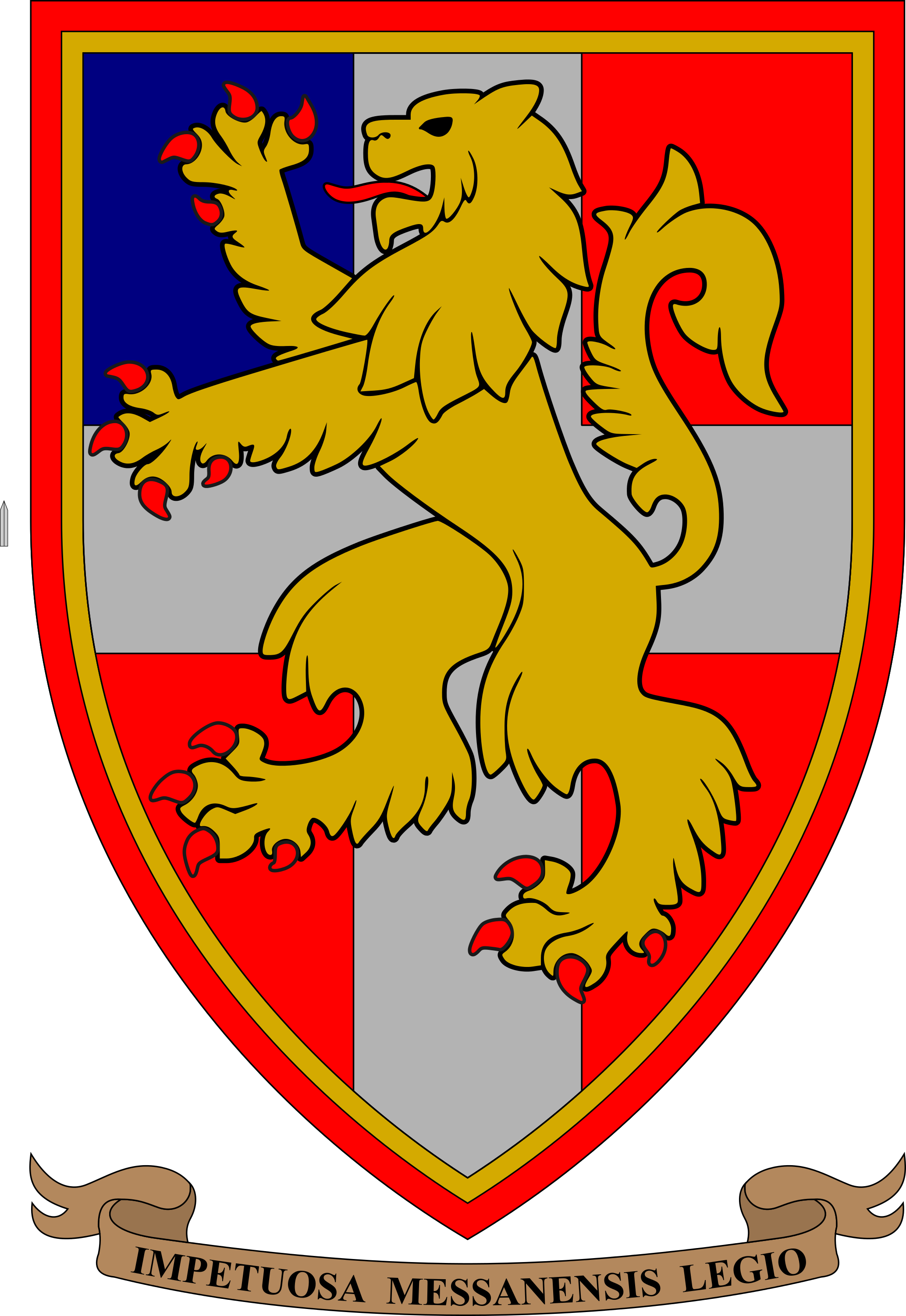
Coat of Arms of the 94th Infantry Regiment "Messina", 1939

On 24 May 1939 the division ceded 226th Infantry Regiment "Arezzo" to the newly activated 53rd Infantry Division "Arezzo". On the same day the division took its traditional name "Messina", dissolved the XVIII Infantry Brigade, with the two remaining infantry regiments coming under direct command of the division, and the 2nd Artillery Regiment was given the name "Messina".

==== Invasion of Yugoslavia ====
The Messina did not participate in the invasion of France in June 1940 and remained at its bases in the Marche region. On 3 April 1941 the division arrived in Albania and moved to positions between Shkodër and Drisht in the North of the country for the upcoming invasion of Yugoslavia. On 12–13 April 1941 the division skirmished with Yugoslavian forces along Mount Tarabosh on the western side of Lake Skadar. On 15 April the Italian XVII Army Corps with the Messina, 32nd Infantry Division "Marche", and 131st Armored Division "Centauro" crossed the Yugoslav border and moved towards Bar in Montenegro, which was taken on 16 April. On 17 April 1941, the Messina captured Cetinje and Kotor, where much of the Royal Yugoslav Navy was at bay. The Messina then advanced to Podgorica, reaching the city on 25 April 1941. The division remained there as occupation force, with its area of responsibility covering Cetinje, Danilovgrad, Podgorica, Berane, and Kotor. Almost immediately Yugoslav partisan activity commenced and the Messina fought partisan formations in Virpazar, Šavnik, Kotor, and Cetinje.

==== Croatia ====
While the Messina was on occupation duty in Yugoslavia the division's regimental depots in Italy raised the 155th Infantry Division "Emilia": the depot of the 93rd Infantry Regiment "Messina" raised the 119th Infantry Regiment "Emilia", the depot of the 94th Infantry Regiment "Messina" raised the 120th Infantry Regiment "Emilia", and the depot of the 2nd Artillery Regiment "Messina" raised the 155th Artillery Regiment "Emilia".

In early August 1942 the division was transferred to Metković in Croatia, where it continued with anti-partisans. From 12 August to 2 September 1942 the Messina operated against partisan forces in the Biokovo area, where Italian forces burned 10 villages, and killed and arrested several hundred people.

Between 5 and 10 October 1942 the Messina participated in Operation Alfa with the aim to retake Prozor in Bosnia and Herzegovina. The operation, led by VI Army Corps achieved its objectives in 6 days.

After the Armistice of Cassibile was announced on 8 September 1943 the Messina was ordered separately by German, Yugoslav, and Croatian forces to hand over its weapons and surrender. The division refused and in the ensuing confusion the 93rd Infantry Regiment "Messina" and the 108th CC.NN. Legion "Stamira" managed to embark and sail to liberated Apulia in southern Italy. The rest of the division was dissolved by the Germans on 13 September 1943.

== Organization ==
18th Infantry Division "Messina" organization in 1940

- 18th Infantry Division "Messina", in Ancona
  - Headquarters
    - Command Company
    - 52nd Carabinieri Section
    - 53rd Carabinieri Section
    - 91st Field Post Office
    - 18th Infantry Division Command Transport Squad
  - 93rd Infantry Regiment "Messina", in Ancona
    - Command Company
    - 3 × Fusilier battalions
    - Support Weapons Battery (65/17 mod. 13 infantry support guns)
    - Mortar Company (81mm mod. 35 mortars)
  - 94th Infantry Regiment "Messina", Fano
    - Command Company
    - 3 × Fusilier battalions
    - Support Weapons Battery (65/17 mod. 13 infantry support guns)
    - Mortar Company (81mm mod. 35 mortars)
  - 2nd Artillery Regiment "Messina", in Pesaro
    - Command Unit
    - I Group (100/17 mod. 14 howitzers)
    - II Group (75/27 mod. 11 field guns)
    - III Group (75/13 mod. 15 mountain guns)
    - 1 × Anti-aircraft battery (20/65 mod. 35 anti-aircraft guns)
    - Ammunition and Supply Unit
  - XVIII Mortar Battalion
  - 18th Anti-tank Company (47/32 mod. 35 anti-tank guns; transferred to the 210th Coastal Division)
  - 18th Telegraph and Radio Operators Company
  - 48th Engineer Company
  - 49th Medical Section
    - 3 × Field hospitals
    - 1 × Surgical Unit
  - 18th Autocarrette Section
  - 23rd Supply Section
  - 190th Transport Section

Attached from 10 February 1941:

- 108th CC.NN. Legion "Stamira", in Ancona
  - CII CC.NN. Battalion
  - CVIII CC.NN. Battalion
  - 108th CC.NN. Machine Gun Company

== Commanding officers ==
The division's commanding officers were:

- Generale di Divisione Francesco Zani (1 September 1939 - 26 April 1941)
- Generale di Brigata Carlo Tucci (27 April 1941 - 10 October 1941)
- Colonel Aldo Gabutti (acting, 11 October 1941 - 2 November 1941)
- Generale di Brigata Carlo Tucci (3 November 1941 - 8 February 1942)
- Colonel Giovanni Bertelli (acting, 9 February 1942 - 3 March 1942)
- Generale di Brigata Carlo Tucci (4 March 1942 - 17 September 1942)
- Generale di Brigata Attilio Amato (acting, 18 September 1942 - 15 October 1942)
- Generale di Divisione Guglielmo Spicacci (16 October 1942 - 13 September 1943)

== CROWCASS ==
The names of eight men attached to the division can be found in the Central Registry of War Criminals and Security Suspects (CROWCASS) set up by the Anglo-American Supreme Headquarters Allied Expeditionary Force in 1945. The names can be found at: Central Registry of War Criminals and Security Suspects from the Kingdom of Italy.
