= 72nd Infantry Regiment "Puglie" =

Inactive Italian Army infantry unit

- 72° Reggimento Fanteria "Puglie"
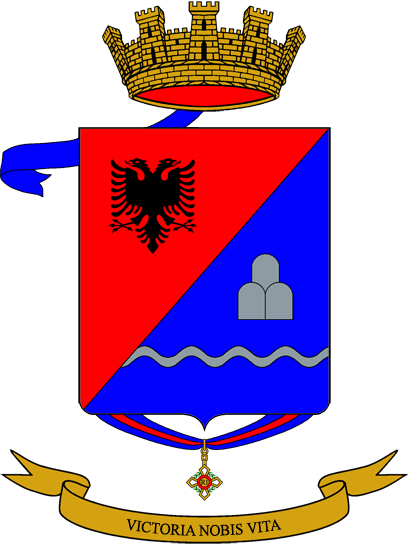
- Regimental coat of arms
- Active: 1 Aug. 1862 – 23 Nov. 1917; 18 May 1918 – 18 Oct. 1926; 15 April 1939 – 8 Sept. 1943; 1 May 1977 – 6 Nov. 1999
- Country: Italy
- Branch: Italian Army
- Garrison/HQ: Albenga
- Motto: "Victoria nobis vita"
- Anniversaries: 13 April 1941 – Battle of Méry-Prémecy
- Decorations: 1× Military Order of Italy; 1× Bronze Medal of Military Valor

Insignia
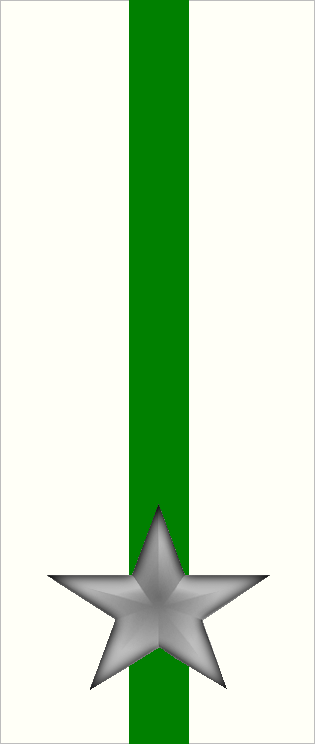
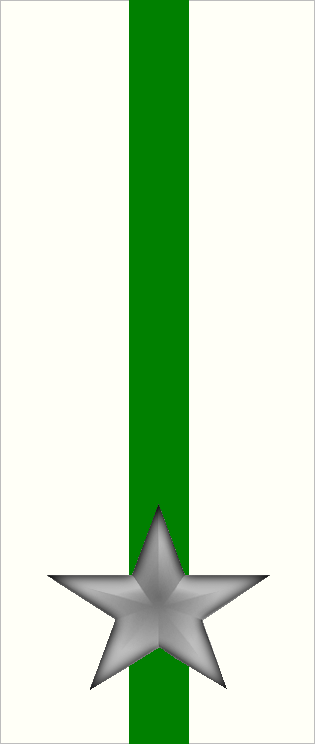
- Regimental gorget patches

The 72nd Infantry Regiment "Puglie" (Italian: 72° Reggimento Fanteria "Puglie") is an inactive unit of the Italian Army last based in Albenga. Formed in 1862 the regiment is part of the Italian Army's infantry arm and named for the region of Apulia.

The regiment was one of ten infantry regiments formed on 1 August 1862. In 1866 the regiment participated in the Third Italian War of Independence. During World War I the regiment fought on the Italian front and the Macedonian front. The regiment was disbanded in 1926 and reformed in April 1939. During World War II the regiment was assigned to the 38th Infantry Division "Puglie", with which it fought in the Greco-Italian War. The division was in northern Albania and Kosovo, when the Armistice of Cassibile was announced on 8 September 1943 and was soon thereafter disbanded by invading German forces. The regiment was reformed as battalion sized training unit in 1977 and disbanded in 1999.

== History ==
=== Formation ===
On 1 August 1862 the 29th Infantry Regiment (Brigade "Pisa"), 30th Infantry Regiment (Brigade "Pisa"), 33rd Infantry Regiment (Brigade "Livorno"), 34th Infantry Regiment (Brigade "Livorno"), 57th Infantry Regiment (Brigade "Abruzzi"), and 58th Infantry Regiment (Brigade "Abruzzi") ceded their 17th Company and 18th Company to help form the 72nd Infantry Regiment (Brigade "Puglie") in Milan. The twelve companies were grouped into three battalions. On the same date the 62nd Infantry Regiment (Brigade "Sicilia") ceded a depot company to help form the new regiment's depot in Milan, while the 4th Provisional Depot in Milazzo in Sicily provided four companies to form the regiment's IV Battalion, which initially remained based in Milazzo.

The regiment was assigned, together with the 71st Infantry Regiment, to the Brigade "Puglie" in Milan. The brigade's command and the 71st Infantry Regiment had also been formed on 1 August 1962, with the 13th Infantry Regiment (Brigade "Pinerolo"), 14th Infantry Regiment (Brigade "Pinerolo"), 19th Infantry Regiment (Brigade "Brescia"), 20th Infantry Regiment (Brigade "Brescia"), 21st Infantry Regiment (Brigade "Cremona"), and 22nd Infantry Regiment (Brigade "Cremona") ceding their 17th Company and 18th Company to help form the three battalions of the 71st Infantry Regiment, while the 62nd Infantry Regiment (Brigade "Sicilia") provided the depot company. The 71st Infantry Regiment's IV Battalion was also formed in Sicily – namely in Bagheria with two companies from the 3rd Provisional Depot and two companies from the 5th Provisional Depot.

In 1866 the regiment participated in the Third Italian War of Independence. On 25 October 1871 the brigade level was abolished and the two regiments of the Brigade "Puglie" were renamed 71st Infantry Regiment "Puglie", respectively 72nd Infantry Regiment "Puglie". On 2 January 1881 the brigade level was reintroduced and the two regiments were renamed again as 72st Infantry Regiment (Brigade "Puglie") and 72nd Infantry Regiment (Brigade "Puglie").

On 1 November 1884 the regiment ceded some of its companies to help form the 90th Infantry Regiment (Brigade "Salerno") in Bologna. In 1895–96 the regiment provided seven officers and 180 enlisted for units deployed to Italian Eritrea for the First Italo-Ethiopian War. In 1911–12 the regiment provided volunteers to augment units fighting in the Italo-Turkish War.

=== World War I ===
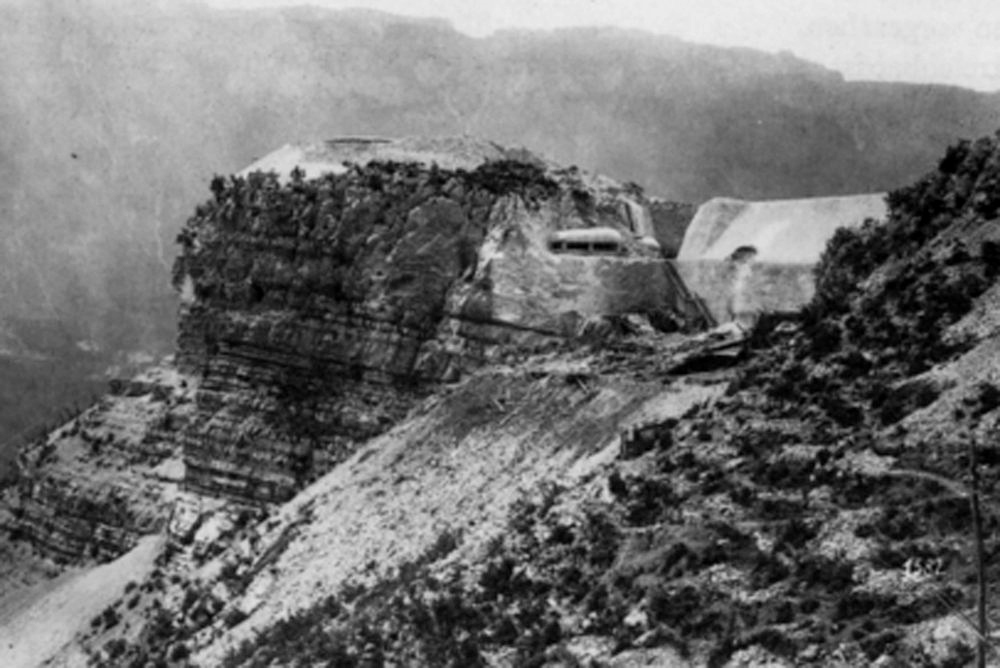
The Austro-Hungarian fort at Pozzacchio

At the outbreak of World War I, the Brigade "Puglie" formed, together with the Brigade "Roma" and the 29th Field Artillery Regiment, the 9th Division. At the time the 72nd Infantry Regiment consisted of three battalions, each of which fielded four fusilier companies and one machine gun section. On 1 March 1915 the 72nd Infantry Regiment's depot in Mantua formed the brigade command of the Brigade "Mantova" and the 114th Infantry Regiment (Brigade "Mantova"). After Italy's entry into the war on 23 May 1915 the Brigade "Puglie" was deployed to the Italian front: in June 1915 the brigade fought against Austro-Hungarian forces in the Trentino sector of the front. In November of the same year the brigade was on the Karst plateau, where it fought in the Fourth Battle of the Isonzo, with the 72nd Infantry Regiment trying to take Podgora hill. In February 1916 the brigade was transferred to Albania, but already on 10 May 1916 it was repatriated and sent as reinforcement to the Trentino sector during the Battle of Asiago. On 22 May the brigade entered the frontline on Monte Pasubio and held the mountain against repeated Austro-Hungarian attacks. On 26 June the brigade was deployed in the Vallarsa vallery and participated there in the Italian counteroffensive, during which the 72nd Infantry Regiment tried unsuccessfully to take the Austro-Hungarian fort at Valmorbia.

In February 1917 the depot of the regiment in Mantua formed the brigade command of the Brigade "Mantova" and the 253rd Infantry Regiment (Brigade "Porto Maurizio"). In May 1917 the regiment fought in the Tenth Battle of the Isonzo on the slopes of Monte Ermada. In August of the same year the regiment fought in the Eleventh Battle of the Isonzo on the Banjšice plateau. In October 1917 the regiment fought during the Battle of Caporetto on Monte Globočak and in November retreated with the rest of the army to the Piave river. On 13 November 1917 the 71st Infantry Regiment was disbanded and its personnel used to reinforce units, which had suffered heavy losses during the retreat. On 15 November the brigade command was disbanded and on 23 November the 72nd Infantry Regiment.

On 18 May 1918 the brigade and its two regiments were reformed. In June 1918 the brigade fought in the Second Battle of the Piave River. From 25–30 August 1918 the brigade was shipped to Vlorë in Albania to participate in the last offensive on the Macedonian front. The brigade operated in the area of the lower Vjosa river and on 3 October the 71st Infantry Regiment liberated Berat.

=== Interwar years ===
On 18 October 1926 the 72nd Infantry Regiment "Puglie" was disbanded and its two battalions were transferred to the 33rd Infantry Regiment "Livorno" and 34th Infantry Regiment "Livorno". On 31 December 1926 the Brigade "Puglie", which now consisted of the 71st Infantry Regiment "Puglie", 56th Infantry Regiment "Marche", and 58th Infantry Regiment "Abruzzi", was renamed X Infantry Brigade. The brigade was the infantry component of the 10th Territorial Division of Padua.

In 1934, the 10th Territorial Division of Padua changed its name to 10th Infantry Division "Piave". A name change that also extended to the division's infantry brigade. On 15 April 1939 the 72nd Infantry Regiment "Puglie" was reformed in Vittorio Veneto and assigned to the newly formed 38th Infantry Division "Puglie". At the same time the 71st Infantry Regiment "Puglie" was transferred from the 10th Infantry Division "Piave" to the newly formed division.

=== World War II ===
At the outbreak of World War II the regiment consisted of a command, a command company, three fusilier battalions, a support weapons battery equipped with 65/17 infantry support guns, and a mortar company equipped with 81mm Mod. 35 mortars. In February 1941 the division was sent to Albania to reinforce the Italian front in the Greco-Italian War. On 5 March the division entered the front at Dishnicë. From 9 March 1941 the division tried to take Monastery Hill near the hamlet of Komarak, as part of the failed Italian Spring Offensive. By 11 March 1941 the division had suffered so many casualties that it was removed from the front line and sent to the rear to be rebuilt.

On 1 April 1941 the division was transferred to the Albanian-Yugoslav border for the upcoming Invasion of Yugoslavia. On 11 April the division crossed the border and entered Kosovo. On 27–28 April 1941 the Puglie occupied Prizren, Peć and Gjakova. The division remained in Kosovo on anti-partisan duty until the Armistice of Cassibile was announced on 8 September 1943. After the announcement the division retreated to Albania, where it was disbanded by invading German forces near Shkodër.

For their conduct during the Greco-Italian War and the Invasion of Yugoslavia the 71st Infantry Regiment "Puglie" and 72nd Infantry Regiment "Puglie" were both awarded a Bronze Medal of Military Valor.

=== Cold War ===
During the 1975 army reform the army disbanded the regimental level and newly independent battalions were granted for the first time their own flags. On 15 November 1975 the I Battalion of the 157th Infantry Regiment "Liguria" in Diano Castello was renamed 26th Infantry Battalion "Bergamo". The battalion consisted of a command, a command platoon, and eight recruits companies, four of which were detached to Albenga. The battalion was assigned to the Armored Division "Centauro", as the division's recruits training battalion.

On 1 May 1977 the detachment in Albenga became an autonomous unit and was renamed 72nd Infantry Battalion "Puglie". Already on 14 March 1977 the President of the Italian Republic Giovanni Leone had issued decree 173, which assigned the flag and traditions of the 72nd Infantry Regiment "Puglie" to the battalion. The battalion was assigned to the Armored Division "Centauro", as one of the division's two recruits training battalion, and consisted of a command, a command platoon, and four recruits companies. In 1988 the command platoon was expanded to command and services company.

=== Recent times ===
On 1 October 1993 the 72nd Infantry Battalion "Puglie" lost its autonomy and the next day the battalion entered the reformed 72nd Regiment "Puglie" as I Battalion.

On 6 November 1999 the 72nd Regiment "Puglie" was renamed 157th Regiment "Liguria" and the flag of the 72nd Infantry Regiment "Puglie" was transferred to the Shrine of the Flags in the Vittoriano.
