= 157th Infantry Regiment "Liguria" =

Inactive Italian Army infantry unit

- 157° Reggimento Fanteria "Liguria"
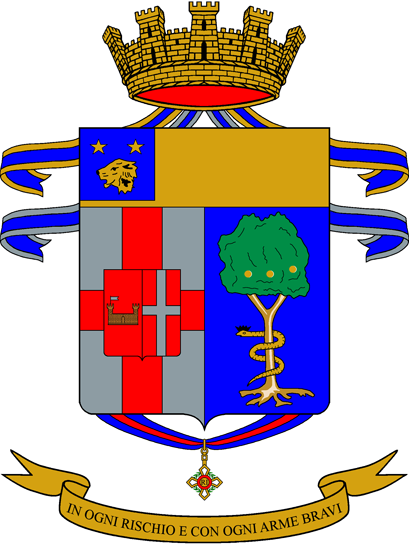
- Regimental coat of arms
- Active: 1 March 1915 – 5 Jan. 1941; 1 April 1947 – 13 Oct. 1995; 6 Nov. 1999 – June 2004
- Country: Italy
- Branch: Italian Army
- Garrison/HQ: Albenga
- Nicknames: Leoni di Liguria (Lions of Liguria)
- Motto: "In ogni rischi e con ogni arme bravi"
- Anniversaries: 16 June 1916 – Battle of Monte Zovetto
- Decorations: 1× Military Order of Italy; 2× Gold Medals of Military Valor; 2× Silver Medals of Military Valor

Insignia
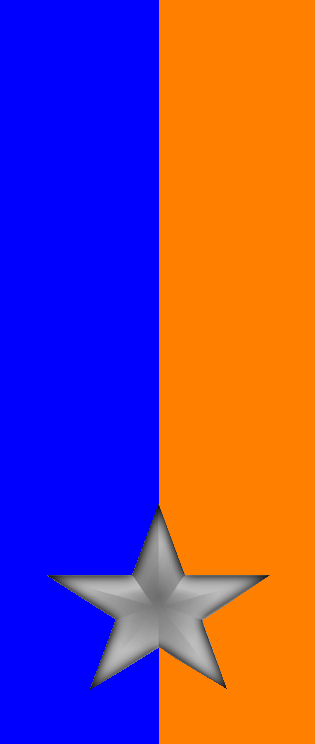
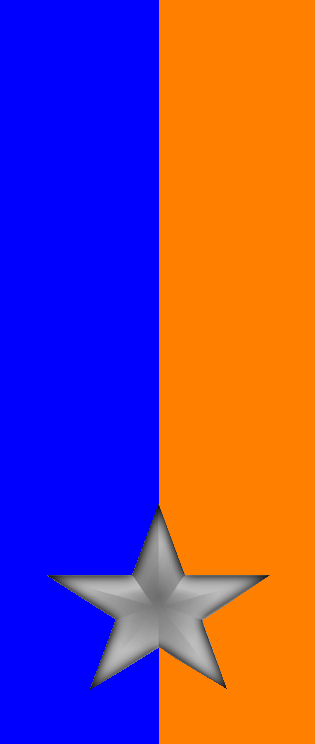
- Regimental gorget patches

The 157th Infantry Regiment "Liguria" (Italian: 157° Reggimento Fanteria "Liguria") is an inactive unit of the Italian Army last based in Albenga. The regiment is named for the region of Liguria and part of the Italian Army's infantry arm.

The regiment was formed in preparation for Italy's entry into World War I. During the war the regiment fought on the Italian front and was awarded Italy's highest military honor the Gold Medal of Military Valor. In 1937 the regiment moved to Italian Libya, where it was assigned to the 63rd Infantry Division "Cirene". In September 1940 the Cirene division participated in the Italian invasion of Egypt, but the division and regiment were destroyed in January 1941 in the Battle of Bardia. For its conduct in Egypt and Libya the regiment's III Battalion was awarded a Gold Medal of Military Valor. Reformed in 1947 the regiment was reduced to a battalion sized motorized unit in 1975. In 1993 the regiment was reformed, disbanded in 1995, and reformed once more as training unit in 1999, which remained active until 2004.

== History ==
=== Formation ===
The 157th Infantry Regiment (Brigade "Liguria") was formed, together with its sister regiment the 158th Infantry Regiment (Brigade "Liguria"), on 1 March 1915 in the city of Genoa, the capital of Liguria. The two regiments formed the Brigade "Liguria", which had been raised with reservists from Liguria and Southern Piedmont by the following pre-war regiments:

- 33rd Infantry Regiment (Brigade "Livorno") in Cuneo:
  - 157th Infantry Regiment Command
  - I Battalion / 157th Infantry Regiment
- 34th Infantry Regiment (Brigade "Livorno") in Fossano:
  - II Battalion / 157th Infantry Regiment
- 41st Infantry Regiment (Brigade "Modena") in Savona:
  - III Battalion / 158th Infantry Regiment
- 44th Infantry Regiment (Brigade "Forlì") in Novi Ligure:
  - I Battalion / 158th Infantry Regiment (minus the 4th Company)
- 74th Infantry Regiment (Brigade "Lombardia") in Bra:
  - III Battalion / 157th Infantry Regiment
- 90th Infantry Regiment (Brigade "Salerno") in Genoa:
  - Brigade "Liguria" Command
  - 158th Infantry Regiment Command
  - II Battalion / 158th Infantry Regiment
  - 4th Company / I Battalion / 158th Infantry Regiment

Each battalion consisted of four fusilier companies and one machine gun section. The Brigade "Liguria" formed, together with the Brigade "Emilia", the 33rd Division.

=== World War I ===
During World War I the Brigade "Liguria" fought on the Italian front, initially in 1915 along the Isonzo river in the East in the area of Monte Nero, however on 15 May 1916 Austro-Hungary commenced the Battle of Asiago and the brigade spent the rest of the war fighting on the Asiago plateau. In June 1916 the brigade fought on the slopes of Monte Zovetto, then defended the Coston di Lora, and in October conquered Austrian positions on Monte Pasubio. For their conduct in 1916 the brigade's two regiments were each awarded Italy's highest military honor, the Gold Medal of Military Valor.

In November and December 1917 the brigade aggressively defended the Meletta di Gallio and Monte Zomo, for which both regiments were awarded a Silver Medal of Military Valor. In June 1918 the brigade defended the Col del Rosso and Col d'Echelle during the Second Battle of the Piave River. During the final battle of the war on the Italian front, the Battle of Vittorio Veneto in October 1918, the brigade attacked Austrian positions on Monte Corno and Monte Spil and once the Austrian lines had been breached advanced into Trentino, where it reached Rovereto by 4 November 1918.

=== Interwar years ===
After World War I the Royal Italian Army disbanded the brigades and the regiments formed during the war, with the exception of brigades, whose regiments had both been awarded a Gold Medal of Military Valor. In 1921 the 157th Infantry Regiment moved to Zadar in the newly conquered Province of Zara and was reduced to two battalions. In 1926 the regiment merged its two battalions into a single battalion and on 30 September 157th Infantry Regiment, now renamed 157th Infantry Regiment "Liguria", was assigned to the XVIII Infantry Brigade, which was the infantry component of the 18th Territorial Division of Ancona. On 6 November the command of the Brigade "Liguria" and the command of the 158th Infantry Regiment were disbanded, and one of the battalions of the 158th joined the 157th in Zadar, while the 158th's other battalion was transferred to the 89th Infantry Regiment "Salerno".The

In 1929 the regiment left Zadar and moved to Senigallia and in 1930 the regiment moved to Macerata. In 1934 the 18th Territorial Division of Ancona was renamed 18th Infantry Division "Metauro". A name change that also extended to the division's infantry brigade. On 1 October 1937 the 63rd Infantry Division "Cirene" was established in Benghazi in Libya with the 225th Infantry Regiment "Arezzo" of the 24th Infantry Division "Gran Sasso" and the 157th Infantry Regiment "Liguria". Both regiments left Italy and moved to Cyrenaica to join the Cirene. On 1 March 1938 the 225th Infantry Regiment "Arezzo" was renamed 158th Infantry Regiment "Liguria" and in 1939 the division's regiments were renamed "Cirene".

=== World War II ===
At the outbreak of World War II the regiment consisted of a command, a command company, three fusilier battalions, a support weapons battery equipped with 65/17 infantry support guns, and a mortar company equipped with 81mm Mod. 35 mortars. When Italy entered the war on 10 June 1940, the Cirene was at Al Adam (now Tobruk Airport) in the East of Italian Libya. From 9 September 1940 the Cirene participated in the Italian invasion of Egypt, which started the Western Desert campaign. The division was forced to retreat to Bardia during the British Operation Compass offensive. The division and its regiments were destroyed on 5 January 1941 during the Battle of Bardia.

For its conduct during the Western Desert campaign the President of Italy awarded on 7 December 1951 a Gold Medal of Military Valor to the III Battalion of the 157th Infantry Regiment "Cirene", while the division's two infantry regiment were each awarded a Silver Medal of Military Valor.

=== Cold War ===
On 1 April 1947 the 157th Infantry Regiment "Liguria" was reformed in Genoa and on 1 January 1951 the regiment was assigned to the Infantry Division "Cremona". The regiment consisted of a command, a command company, four battalions, and an anti-tank company.

During the 1975 army reform the army disbanded the regimental level and newly independent battalions were granted for the first time their own flags. On 1 June 1975 the regiment's II and III battalions were disbanded. On 1 August 1975, the regiment's I Battalion became an autonomous unit and moved from Genoa to Diano Castello, where the battalion was used to form the Recruits Training Battalion "Centauro", which on 15 November 1975 was renamed 26th Infantry Battalion "Bergamo". On 29 October 1975, the 157th Infantry Regiment "Liguria" was disbanded and the next day the regiment's IV Battalion in Novi Ligure became an autonomous unit and was renamed 157th Motorized Infantry Battalion "Liguria". The battalion consisted of a command, a command and services company, three motorized companies, and a heavy mortar company equipped with towed 120mm Mod. 63 mortars. At the time the battalion fielded 844 men (41 officers, 94 non-commissioned officers, and 709 soldiers). On 30 October 1975 the Infantry Division "Cremona" was reduced to Motorized Brigade "Cremona".

On 12 November 1976, the President of the Italian Republic Giovanni Leone assigned with decree 846 the flag and traditions of the 157th Infantry Regiment "Liguria" to the 157th Motorized Infantry Battalion "Liguria".

=== Recent times ===
On 1 June 1991 battalion was reorganized as a mechanized unit and renamed 157th Mechanized Infantry Battalion "Liguria". The battalion consisted now of a command, a command and services company, three mechanized companies equipped with M113 armored personnel carriers, and a mortar company equipped with M106 mortar carriers with 120mm Mod. 63 mortars. On 22 September 1993 the 157th Mechanized Infantry Battalion "Liguria" lost its autonomy and the next day the battalion entered the reformed 157th Infantry Regiment "Liguria" as I Mechanized Battalion.

On 13 October 1995 the 157th Infantry Regiment "Liguria" was disbanded and the flag of the regiment was transferred on 17 October to the Shrine of the Flags in the Vittoriano in Rome.

On 6 November 1999 the regiment was reformed in Albenga by renaming the 72nd Infantry Regiment "Puglie". The 157th served as training unit until it was disbanded again in June 2004.
