= 2nd Tank Regiment (Italy) =

Inactive Italian Army tank unit

- 2° Reggimento Carri
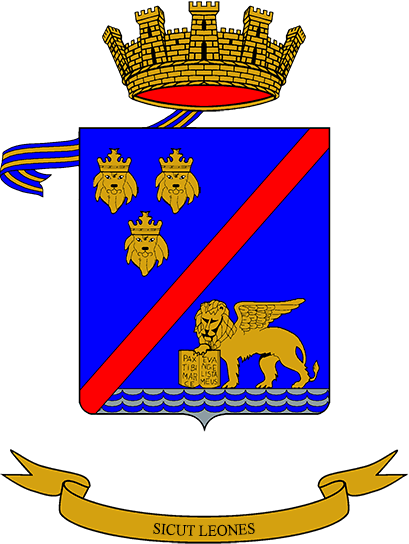
- Regimental coat of arms
- Active: 1 Sept. 1935 — 8 Sept. 1943; 24 May 1964 — 31 Oct. 1995
- Country: Italy
- Branch: Italian Army
- Part of: Mechanized Brigade "Gorizia"
- Garrison/HQ: San Vito al Tagliamento
- Motto(s): "Sicut Leones"
- Anniversaries: 1 October 1927
- Decorations: 1x Bronze Medal of Army Valor

Insignia
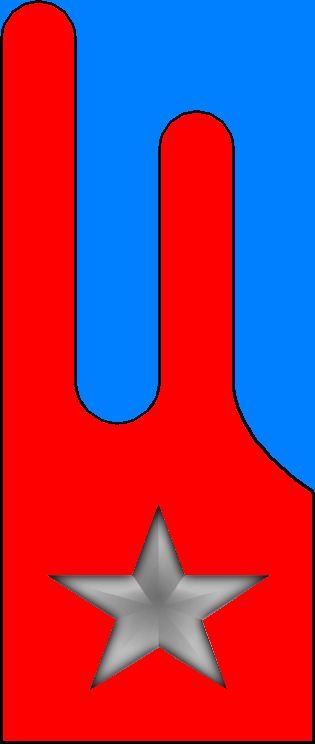
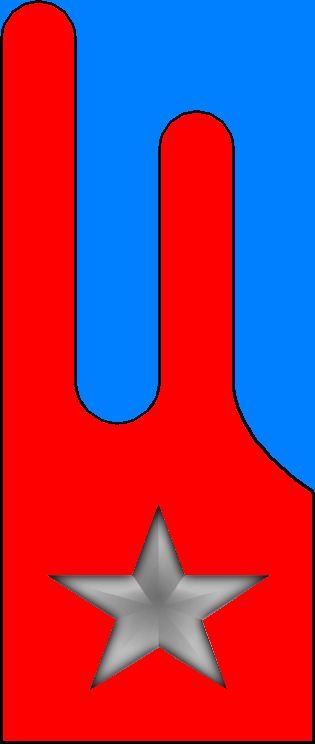
- Tank units gorget patches

The 2nd Tank Regiment (Italian: 2° Reggimento Carri) is an inactive tank regiment of the Italian Army, which was based in San Vito al Tagliamento in Friuli-Venezia Giulia and operationally assigned to the Mechanized Brigade "Gorizia". The 2nd Tank Infantry Regiment, which was formed on 15 September 1936 in Montorio Veronese and renamed 32nd Tank Infantry Regiment on 1 December 1938, is unrelated to the 2nd Tank Regiment, whose lineage traces back to the World War II XXII Tank Battalion L. During World War II the XXII Tank Battalion L fought in 1940 in the Italian invasion of France and in 1941 in the Invasion of Yugoslavia. In October 1941, the battalion was transferred to the island of Sardinia, where it was disbanded shortly after the Armistice of Cassibile had been announced on 8 September 1943. In 1964, the battalion was reformed and assigned to the Lagunari Regiment "Serenissima". In 1975, the battalion became an autonomous unit and was renamed 22nd Tank Battalion "M.O. Piccinini". The battalion was then assigned to the Mechanized Brigade "Gorizia". In 1991, the battalion lost its autonomy and entered the newly formed 22nd Tank Regiment "M.O. Piccinini", which in 1993 was renamed 2nd Tank Regiment. The regiment was disbanded in 1995.

Originally the unit, like all Italian tank units, was part of the army's infantry arm, but on 1 June 1999 the tankers specialty was transferred from the infantry arm to the cavalry arm. The regiment's anniversary falls, as for all tank units, which have not yet distinguished themselves in the battle, on 1 October 1927, the day the tankers speciality was founded.

== History ==
=== Interwar years ===
On 1 September 1935, the XXII Assault Tanks Battalion "Coralli" was formed in Bologna. The battalion was equipped with L3/35 tankettes. The battalion, like all tank battalions at the time, was named for an infantry officer, who had served in World War I and been awarded posthumously Italy's highest military honor the Gold Medal of Military Valor. The XXII Assault Tanks Battalion was named for Major Luigi Coralli, who, as commanding officer of the II Battalion, 21st Infantry Regiment, was killed in action on 15 June 1918 on Monte Pertica during the Second Battle of Monte Grappa.

In December 1935, the battalion was sent to Libya, where it, together with other Italian units, remained for the duration of the Second Italo-Ethiopian War. On 21 July 1936, the battalion returned to Italy and was based in the city of Trento. In 1938, the battalion was renamed XXII Tank Battalion L (with L standing for Italian: "Leggero" or Light) and assigned to the 2nd Tank Infantry Regiment. However already on 1 December 1938 the 2nd Tank Infantry Regiment was renamed 32nd Tank Infantry Regiment and the battalion was transferred on the same date to the 1st Tank Infantry Regiment.

=== World War II ===
On 6 November 1939, the XXII Tank Battalion L was assigned to the newly formed 33rd Tank Infantry Regiment. On 9 April 1940, the battalions assigned to a tank regiment were renumbered and the XXII Tank Battalion L was redesignated as II Tank Battalion L, 33rd Tank Infantry Regiment. In June 1940, the 33rd Tank Infantry Regiment fought in the Italian invasion of France near the Little St Bernard Pass, where the first Italian tankers of World War II were killed in action. In April 1941, the regiment participated in the invasion of Yugoslavia and its tanks advanced along the coast of Dalmatia. In October 1941, the I and II tank battalions L of the 33rd Tank Infantry Regiment became autonomous units and were transferred to the island of Sardinia on coastal defense duty. In the evening of 8 September 1943, the Armistice of Cassibile, which ended hostilities between the Kingdom of Italy and the Anglo-American Allies, was announced by General Dwight D. Eisenhower on Radio Algiers and by Marshal Pietro Badoglio on Italian radio. Shortly thereafter the two tank battalions were disbanded.

=== Cold War ===
On 24 May 1964, the XXII Tank Battalion was reformed in Mestre. The battalion was assigned to the Lagunari Regiment "Serenissima" and equipped with M4 Sherman tanks and M24 Chaffee light tanks. On 25 October 1964, the battalion moved from Mestre to San Vito al Tagliamento, where it received M47 Patton tanks.

During the 1975 army reform the army disbanded the regimental level and newly independent battalions were granted for the first time their own flags, respectively in the case of cavalry units, their own standard. On 20 October 1975, the Lagunari Regiment "Serenissima" was disbanded and the next day the regiment's XXII Tank Battalion in San Vito al Tagliamento became an autonomous unit and was renamed 22nd Tank Battalion "M.O. Piccinini". As part of the reform tank and armored battalions were named for officers, soldiers and partisans of the tank speciality, who had served in World War II and been awarded Italy's highest military honor the Gold Medal of Military Valor. The 22nd Tank Battalion was named for Captain Vittorio Piccinini, who, as commanding officer of the 3rd Company, IV Tank Battalion M13/40, 133rd Tank Infantry Regiment, was killed in action on 25 October 1942 during the Second Battle of El Alamein.

The battalion was assigned to the Mechanized Brigade "Gorizia" and consisted of a command, a command and services company, and three tank companies with Leopard 1A2 main battle tanks. The battalion fielded now 434 men (32 officers, 82 non-commissioned officers, and 320 soldiers). On 12 November 1976, the President of the Italian Republic Giovanni Leone granted with decree 846 the 22nd Tank Battalion "M.O. Piccinini" its flag.

For its conduct and work after the 1976 Friuli earthquake the 22nd Tank Battalion "M.O. Piccinini" was awarded a Bronze Medal of Army Valor, which was affixed to the battalion's flag and added to the battalion's coat of arms.

=== Recent times ===
On 27 October 1991, the 22nd Tank Battalion "M.O. Piccinini" lost its autonomy and the next day the battalion entered the newly formed 22nd Tank Regiment "M.O. Piccinini". On 1 October 1993, the regiment was renamed 2nd Tank Regiment. On 26 October 1995, the regiment transferred its flag to the Shrine of the Flags in the Vittoriano in Rome for safekeeping. Five days later, on 31 October 1995, the 2nd Tank Regiment was disbanded.
