= Mechanized Brigade "Gorizia" =

Brigata Meccanizzata "Gorizia"
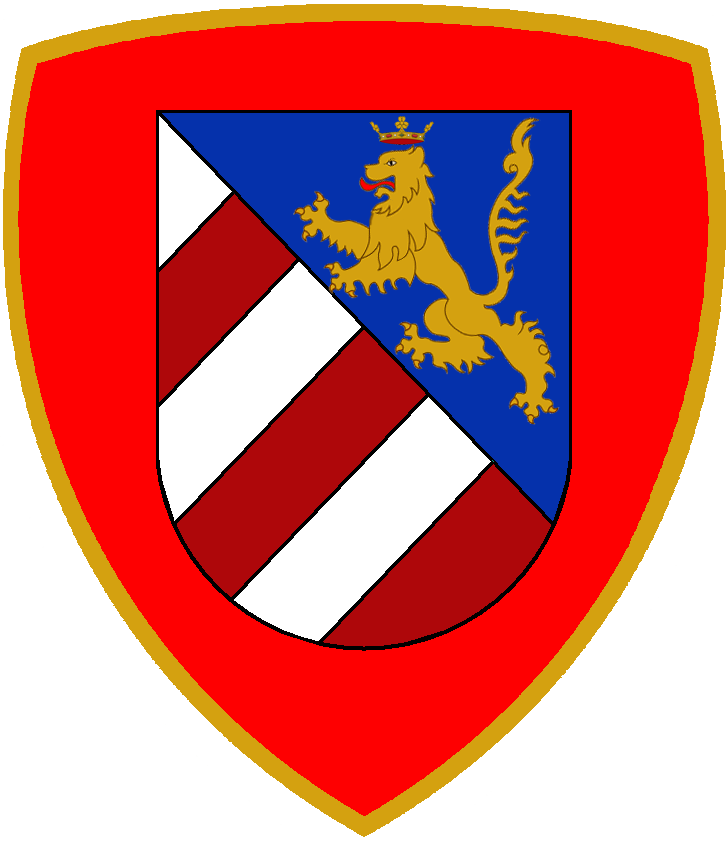
- Coat of Arms of the Mechanized Brigade "Gorizia"
- Active: 1 November 1975 – 30 October 1996
- Country: Italy
- Branch: Italian Army
- Type: Infantry
- Role: Armored warfare
- Part of: 1975–1986 Mechanized Division "Folgore"; 1986–1996 5th Army Corps
- Garrison/HQ: Gorizia

The Mechanized Brigade "Gorizia" was a mechanized brigade of the Italian Army. Its core units were mechanized infantry battalions. The brigade's headquarters was in the city of Gorizia and the brigade's units were based in the region of Friuli-Venezia Giulia. The brigade's name was chosen in memory of the World War I Battle of Gorizia. The brigade's sister brigade, the Armored Brigade "Vittorio Veneto", was named to commemorate the World War I Battle of Vittorio Veneto.

The brigade was founded in, based in, and named after the city of Gorizia. Its coat of arms was based on the coat of arms of the medieval House of Gorizia.

== History ==
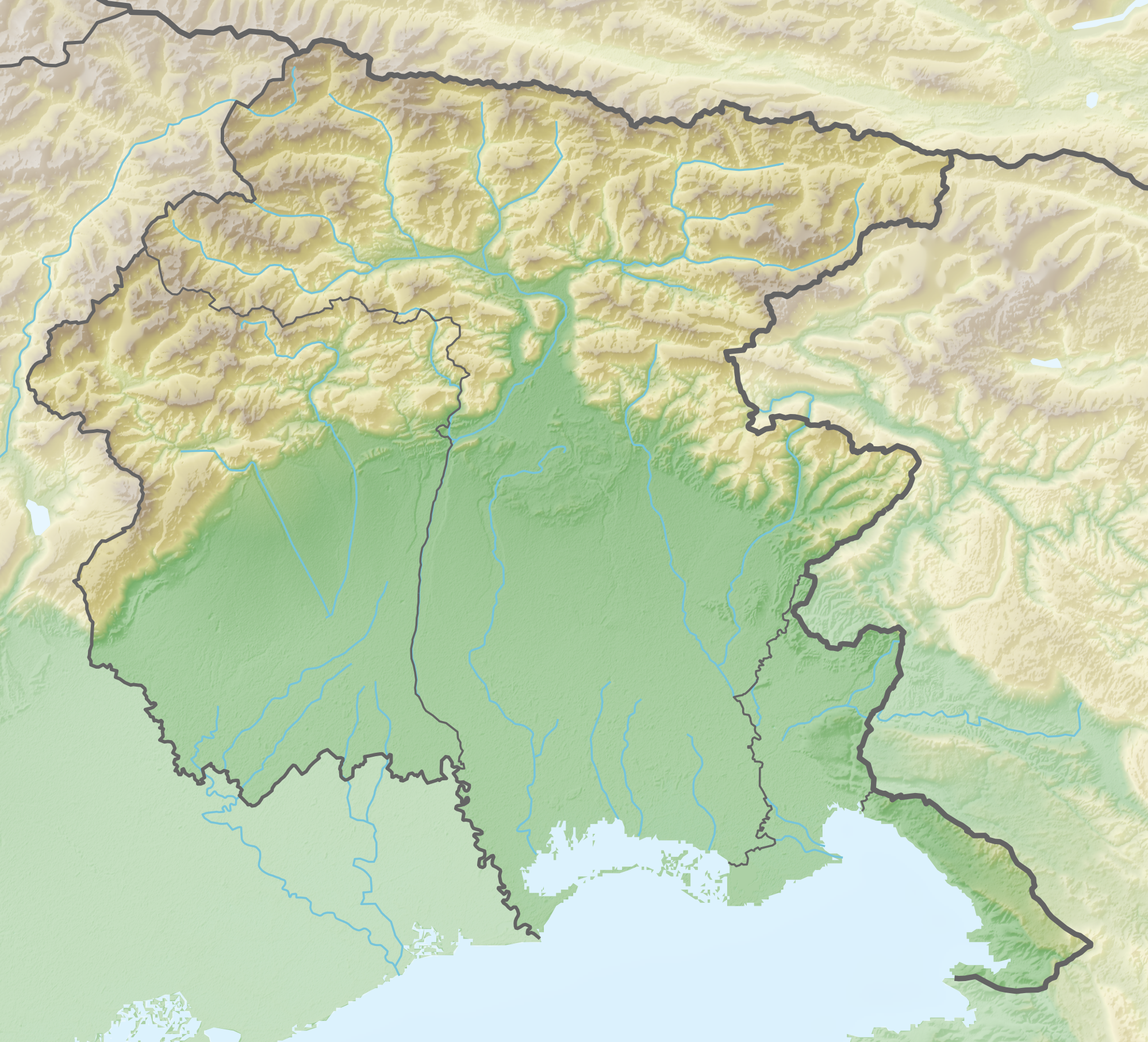
Gorizia units in 1989

The Italian Army undertook a major reorganization in 1975 during which the regimental level was abolished and battalions came under the direct command of multi-arms brigades. Tensions with Yugoslavia over the city of Trieste were allayed by the Treaty of Osimo, and mandatory military service was reduced from 15 to 12 months for the army and air force and from 24 to 18 months for the navy. The army reduced its forces by nearly 45,000 troops. It was decided that the units assigned to the Infantry Division "Folgore" would contract to brigade. After disbanding most units of the division, the remaining units were used to raise the Mechanized Brigade "Gorizia" in Gorizia on 1 November 1975. The brigade's command was created by reorganizing and renaming the command of the 82nd Infantry Regiment "Torino" in Gorizia. After the activation the "Gorizia" brigade entered the Mechanized Division "Folgore", which was part of the 5th Army Corps based in North-Eastern Italy. The 5th Army Corps was tasked with defending the Yugoslav–Italian border against possible attacks by the Warsaw Pact or Yugoslavia. The Gorizia was to defend the city of Gorizia and the brigade's two infantry fortification battalions were tasked to man and hold the fixed positions of the Alpine Wall. The brigade's strength was around 5,000 men and it was composed of the following units:

- Mechanized Brigade "Gorizia", in Gorizia
  - Command and Signal Unit "Gorizia", in Gorizia
  - 33rd Infantry Fortification Battalion "Ardenza", in Fogliano Redipuglia (former III Battalion, 53rd Position Infantry Regiment "Umbria", fielded 10x companies)
  - 41st Mechanized Infantry Battalion "Modena", in Villa Vicentina (former Amphibious Battalion "Isonzo" of the disbanded Lagunari Regiment "Serenissima")
  - 63rd Infantry Fortification Battalion "Cagliari", in San Lorenzo Isontino (former II Battalion, 53rd Position Infantry Regiment "Umbria", fielded 12x companies)
  - 82nd Mechanized Infantry Battalion "Torino", in Cormons(former II Battalion of the disbanded 82nd Infantry Regiment "Torino")
  - 183rd Mechanized Infantry Battalion "Nembo", in Gradisca d'Isonzo (former IV Battalion of the disbanded 183rd Infantry Regiment "Nembo")
  - 22nd Tank Battalion "M.O. Piccinini", in San Vito al Tagliamento (Leopard 1A2 main battle tanks, former XXII Tank Battalion of the disbanded Lagunari Regiment "Serenissima")
  - 46th Field Artillery Group "Trento", in Gradisca d'Isonzo (M114 155mm towed howitzers, former I Self-propelled Field Artillery Group of the disbanded 33rd Field Artillery Regiment)
  - Logistic Battalion "Gorizia", in Gradisca d'Isonzo
  - Anti-tank Company "Gorizia", in Gorizia (BGM-71 TOW anti-tank guided missiles)
  - Engineer Company "Gorizia", in Cormons

On 31 October 1986 the Italian Army abolished the divisional level. Brigades, which had until then been under one of the Army's four divisions, came under the direct command of the Army's 3rd or 5th Army Corps. Thus the Gorizia came under the direct command of the 5th Army Corps. From the disbanded "Folgore" Division the Gorizia received the 53rd Infantry Fortification Battalion "Umbria", in Pavia di Udine, and at the same time ceded the 33rd Infantry Fortification Battalion "Ardenza" to the Mechanized Brigade "Vittorio Veneto".

After the end of the Cold War the Italian Army began to draw down its forces: first the 63rd Infantry Fortification Battalion "Cagliari" was disbanded on 30 November 1991, followed by the 53rd Infantry Fortification Battalion "Umbria" on 31 March 1993, while the 183rd Mechanized Infantry Battalion "Nembo" was transferred to the Paratroopers Brigade "Folgore" in 1991. During the same year the 184th Self-propelled Field Artillery Group "Filottrano" replaced the 46th Field Artillery Group "Trento". At the same time for traditional reasons the battalions were renamed as regiments without changing composition or strength. For the last year of its life the brigades was composed of the following units:

- Mechanized Brigade "Gorizia", in Gorizia
  - Command and Tactical Supports Unit "Gorizia", in Gorizia
  - 2nd Tank Regiment, in San Vito al Tagliamento (Leopard 1A2 Main battle tanks)
  - 41st Mechanized Infantry Regiment "Modena", in Gradisca d'Isonzo (VCC-2 Armoured personnel carriers)
  - 82nd Mechanized Infantry Regiment "Torino", in Cormons (VCC-2 Armoured personnel carriers)
  - 184th Self-propelled Field Artillery Group "Filottrano", in Gradisca d'Isonzo (M109L Self-propelled howitzers)
  - Logistic Battalion "Gorizia", in Gradisca d'Isonzo

On 30 September 1995 the 41st Infantry Regiment was disbanded. On 30 October 1996 the brigade was disbanded with the rest of its units. Only the 82nd Infantry Regiment "Torino" remained active and was transferred to the Mechanized Brigade "Mantova".
