= 38th Infantry Division "Puglie" =

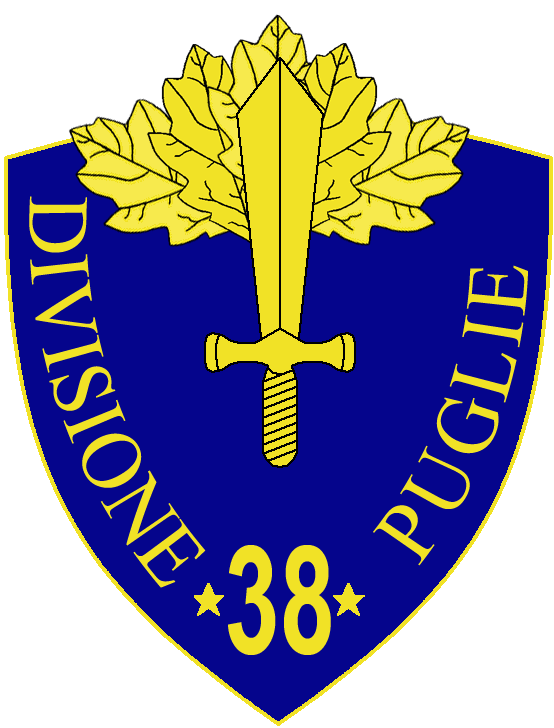
- 38th Infantry Division "Puglie" insignia
- Active: 1939–1943
- Country: Kingdom of Italy
- Branch: Royal Italian Army
- Type: Infantry
- Size: Division
- Garrison/HQ: Conegliano
- Engagements: World War II; Invasion of Yugoslavia

Commanders
- Notable commanders: General Alberto D'Aponte

Insignia
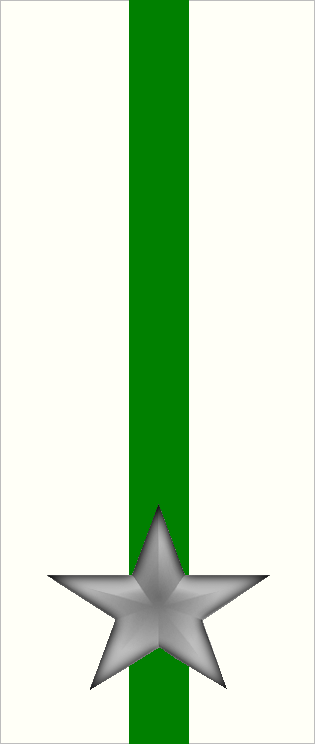
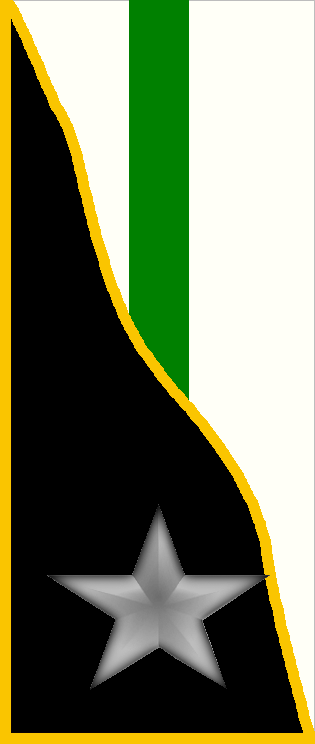
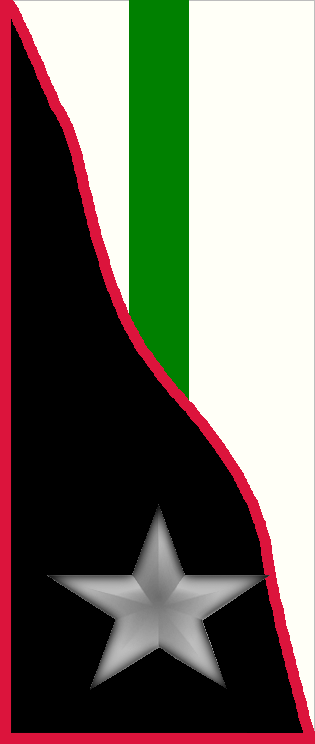
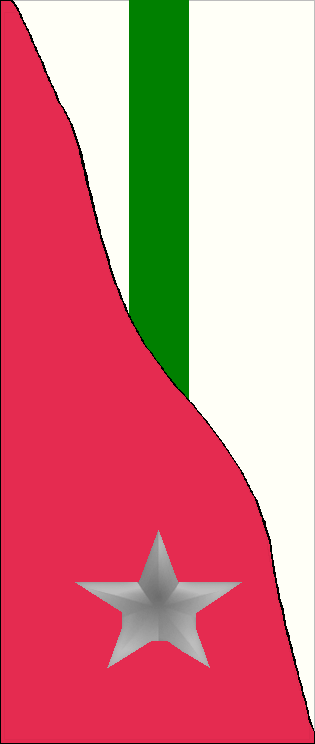
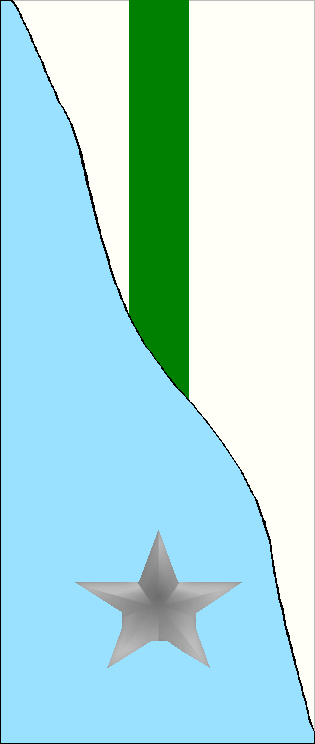
- Identification symbol: Puglie Division gorget patches

The 38th Infantry Division "Puglie" (Italian: 38ª Divisione di fanteria "Puglie") was a infantry division of the Royal Italian Army during World War II. The Puglie was a mountain-type infantry division, which meant that the division's artillery and logistics were moved by pack mules, while in standard infantry divisions artillery and logistics were moved by horse-drawn limbers and carriages. Italy's real mountain warfare divisions were the six alpine divisions manned by Alpini troops.

The division was raised on 15 May 1939 and named for the Southern Italian region of Apulia (Italian: Puglia). The division mostly drafted men from eastern Veneto and the Friuli region, with a majority of soldiers hailing from the towns of Sacile and Vittorio Veneto. The Puglie was disbanded by Germans forces the Armistice of Cassibile between Italy and the Allies was announced on 8 September 1943.

== History ==
The division's lineage begins with the Brigade "Puglie" established in Milan on 1 August 1862 with the 71st and 72nd infantry regiments.

=== World War I ===
The brigade fought on the Italian front in World War I. In fall 1926 the 72nd Infantry Regiment "Puglie" was disbanded, while Brigade "Puglie" was renamed X Infantry Brigade. On 15 May 1939 the 72nd Infantry Regiment "Puglie" was reactivated and the command of the 38th Infantry Division "Puglie" was raised. On the same date the division received the 71st Infantry Regiment "Puglie" from the 10th Infantry Division "Piave" and the 15th Artillery Regiment from the 13th Infantry Division "Re".

=== World War II ===
In February 1941 the division was sent to Albania to reinforce the Italian front in the Greco-Italian War. On 5 March the Puglie entered the front at Dishnicë. From 9 March 1941 the Puglie division tried to take Monastery Hill near the hamlet of Komarak, as part of the failed Italian Spring Offensive. By 11 March 1941 the division had suffered so many casualties that it was removed from the front line and sent to the rear to be rebuilt.

On 1 April 1941 the Puglie was transferred to the Albanian-Yugoslav border for the upcoming Invasion of Yugoslavia. The Puglie took up positions near Kukës, Fushë-Muhurr and Qafë-Murrë. On 7 April 1941 the division defeated Yugoslav attacks at Blatë and on 9 April at Maqellarë. On 11 April the division crossed the border and entered Kosovo, where it captured Debar. On the same day the Puglie met up with German forces entering Kosovo from the north. On 27–28 April 1941 the Puglie occupied Prizren, Peć and Gjakova. On 1 May 1941 additional garrisons were established at Orahovac, Štimlje and Skenderaj and the division's headquarter established itself in Prizren. The Puglie remained in Kosovo on anti-partisan duty for the rest of the war.

After the announcement of the Armistice of Cassibile on 8 September 1943 the Puglie retreated to Albania, where it was disbanded by Albanians

== Organization ==
38th Infantry Division "Puglie" organization in 1940

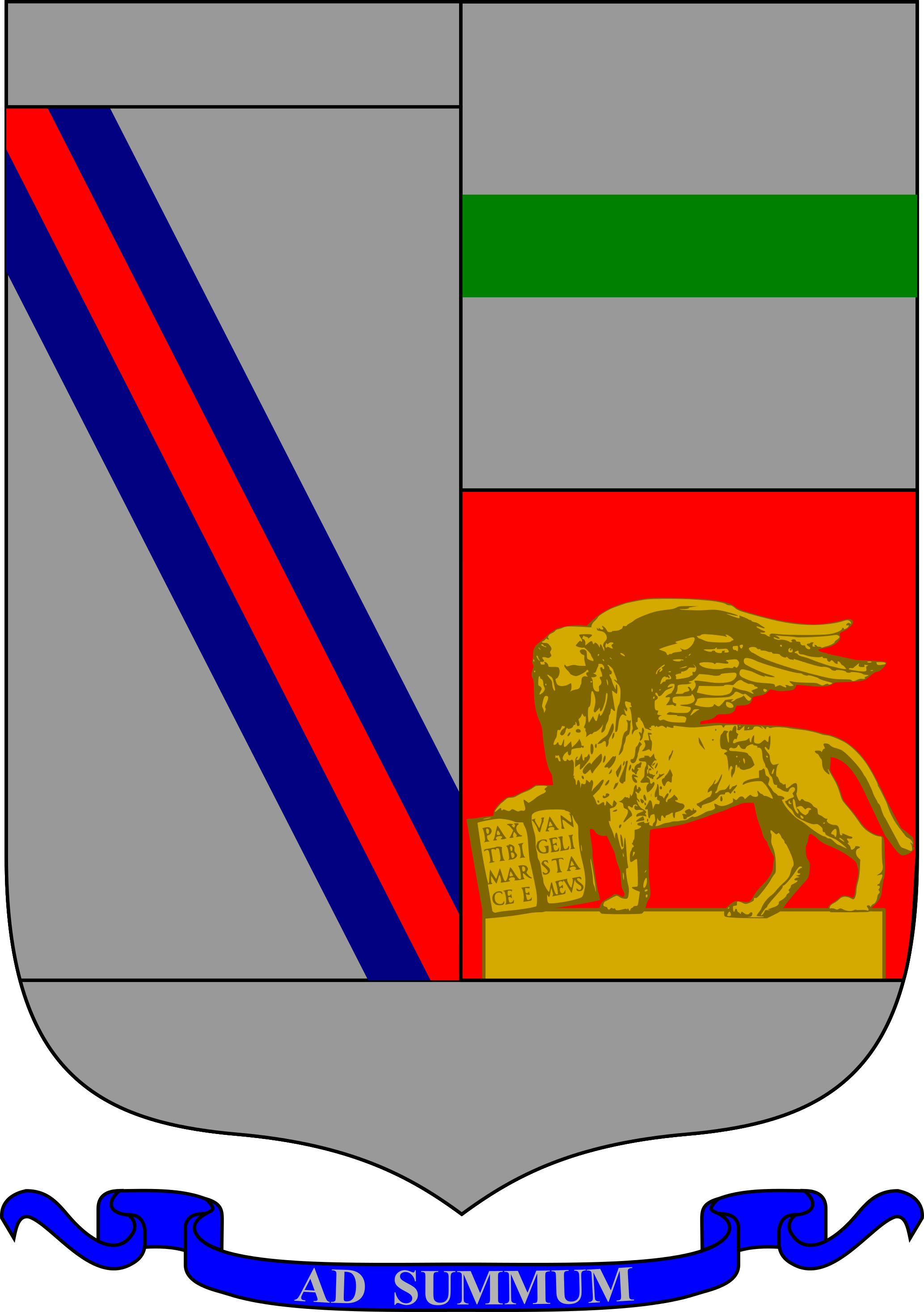
Coat of Arms of the 71st Infantry Regiment "Puglie", 1939

- 38th Infantry Division "Puglie", in Conegliano
  - Headquarters
    - Command Company
    - 71st Carabinieri Section
    - 1 × Carabinieri Section
    - 12th Field Post Office
    - 38th Infantry Division Command Transport Squad
  - 71st Infantry Regiment "Puglie", in Sacile
    - Command Company
    - 3 × Fusilier battalions
    - Support Weapons Battery (65/17 mod. 13 infantry support guns)
    - Mortar Company (81mm mod. 35 mortars)
  - 72nd Infantry Regiment "Puglie", in Vittorio Veneto
    - Command Company
    - 3 × Fusilier battalions
    - Support Weapons Battery (65/17 mod. 13 infantry support guns)
    - Mortar Company (81mm mod. 35 mortars)
  - 15th Artillery Regiment "Puglie", in Conegliano
    - Command Unit
    - I Group (100/17 mod. 14 howitzers)
    - II Group (75/27 mod. 11 field guns)
    - III Group (75/13 mod. 15 mountain guns)
    - 1 × Anti-aircraft battery (20/65 mod. 35 anti-aircraft guns)
    - Ammunition and Supply Unit
  - XXXVIII Mortar Battalion (81mm mod. 35 mortars)
  - 38th Anti-tank Company (47/32 mod. 35 anti-tank guns)
  - 38th Telegraph and Radio Operators Company
  - 43rd Engineer Company
  - 56th Medical Section
  - 56th Supply Section
  - 38th Autocarrette Section
  - 38th Transport Section

Attached to the division from the end of 1940 to early 1942:

- 115th CC.NN. Legion "Del Cimino"
  - CXV CC.NN. Battalion (remained attached to the division until September 1943)
  - CXXI CC.NN. Battalion
  - 115th CC.NN. Machine Gun Company

Attached to the division in 1943:

- 1st Regiment "Cacciatori d'Albania"
  - Battalion "Gramos"
  - Battalion "Korata"
  - Machine Gun Company
  - Cannons Company (47/32 mod. 35 anti-tank guns)

== Commanding officers ==
The division's commanding officers were:

- Generale di Brigata Francesco Zani (15 May 1939 - 31 August 1939)
- Generale di Divisione Mario Marghinotti (1 September 1939 - 1 November 1940)
- Generale di Divisione Alberto d'Aponte (2 November 1940 - 30 April 1942)
- Colonel Gino Reghini (acting, 1-11 May 1942)
- Generale di Divisione Federico d'Arle (12 May 1942 - 1 September 1943)
- Generale di Brigata Luigi Clerico (2-9 September 1943)
