= Logistic Battalion "Gorizia" =

Inactive Italian Army brigade logistics unit

- Battaglione Logistico "Gorizia"
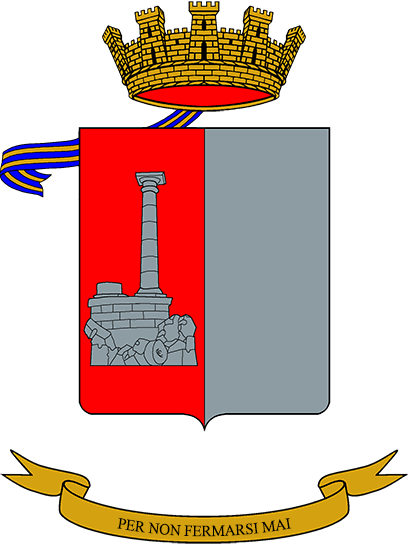
- Battalion coat of arms
- Active: 20 Oct. 1975 — 20 Oct. 1997
- Country: Italy
- Branch: Italian Army
- Type: Military logistics
- Part of: Mechanized Brigade "Gorizia"
- Garrison/HQ: Gradisca d'Isonzo
- Motto(s): "Per non fermarsi mai"
- Anniversaries: 22 May 1916 - Battle of Asiago
- Decorations: 1× Bronze Medal of Army Valor

Insignia
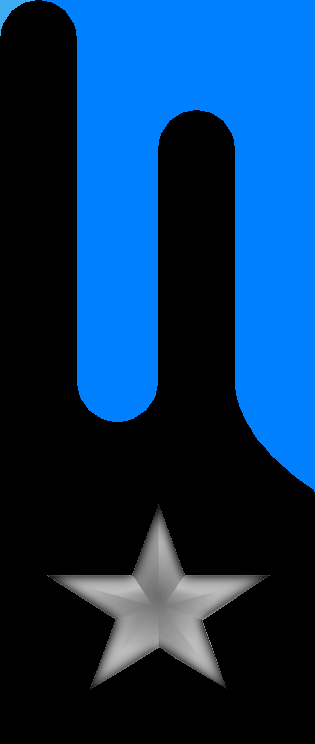
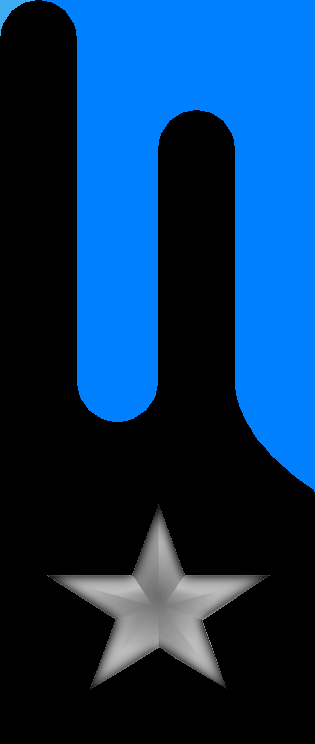
- Unit gorget patches

The Logistic Battalion "Gorizia" (Italian: Battaglione Logistico "Gorizia") is an inactive military logistics battalion of the Italian Army, which was assigned to the Mechanized Brigade "Gorizia". The battalion's anniversary falls, as for all units of the Italian Army's Transport and Materiel Corps, on 22 May, the anniversary of the Royal Italian Army's first major use of automobiles to transport reinforcements to the Asiago plateau to counter the Austro-Hungarian Asiago Offensive in May 1916.

== History ==
=== Cold War ===
As part of the 1975 army reform the units of the Infantry Division "Folgore" were reorganized and on 1 November 1975 the Mechanized Brigade "Gorizia" was formed in the city of Gorizia. Already on 20 October of the same year, the Logistic Battalion "Gorizia" had been formed in Gradisca d'Isonzo for the brigade. Initially the battalion consisted of a command, a command platoon, a supply and transport company, a medium workshop, and a vehicle park. At the time the battalion fielded 692 men (38 officers, 85 non-commissioned officers, and 569 soldiers).

On 12 November 1976, the President of the Italian Republic Giovanni Leone granted with decree 846 the battalion a flag.

For its conduct and work after the 1976 Friuli earthquake the battalion was awarded a Bronze Medal of Army Valor, which was affixed to the battalion's flag and added to the battalion's coat of arms.

On 10 December 1981, the battalion was reorganized and consisted afterwards of the following units:

- Logistic Battalion "Gorizia", in Gradisca d'Isonzo
  - Command and Services Company
  - Supply Company
  - Maintenance Company
  - Medium Transport Company
  - Medical Unit (Reserve)

=== Recent times ===
From 2 February to 1 May 1993, the battalion formed, together with personnel of the Army's Medical Command, the Medical Unit "Gorizia", which operated as part of the Unified Task Force in Somalia.

On 1 April 1996, the battalion was transferred to the Mechanized Brigade "Mantova". On 16 October 1997, the Logistic Battalion "Gorizia" transferred its flag to the Shrine of the Flags in the Vittoriano in Rome for safekeeping, and the following 20 October the battalion was disbanded.

== See also ==
- Military logistics
