= Vrhovlje pri Kojskem =

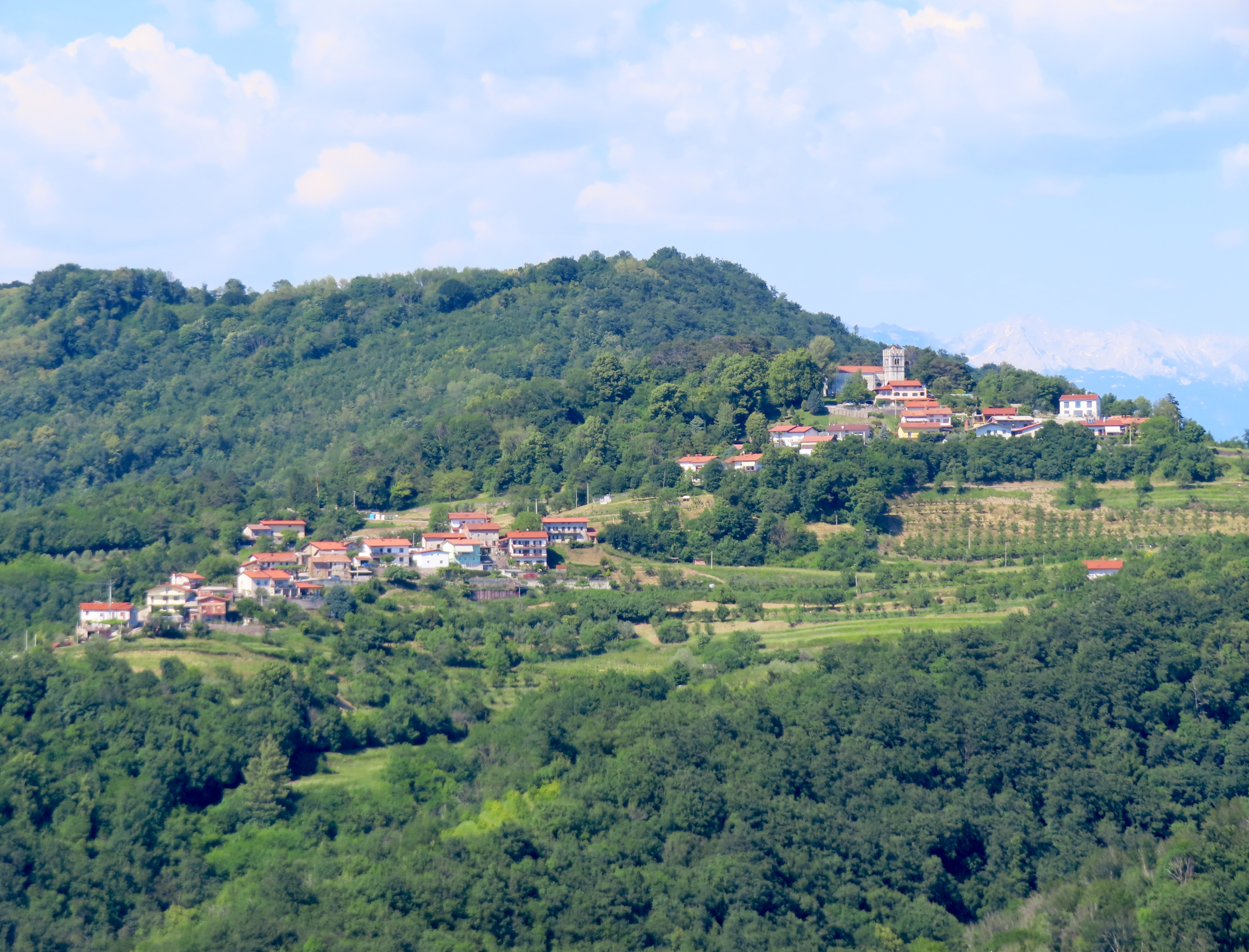

- Location in Slovenia
- Coordinates: 46°1′30.55″N 13°34′31.5″E
- Country: Slovenia
- Traditional region: Slovenian Littoral
- Statistical region: Gorizia
- Municipality: Brda

Area
  - Total: 3.45 km^{2} (1.33 sq mi)
- Elevation: 382 m (1,253 ft)

Population (2020)
  - Total: 103
  - Density: 29.9/km^{2} (77.3/sq mi)

Vrhovlje pri Kojskem (pronounced [ʋəɾˈxoːu̯ljɛ pɾi ˈkoːi̯skɛm]) is a settlement north of Kojsko in the Municipality of Brda in the Littoral region of Slovenia.

== Name ==
The name of the settlement was changed from Vrhovlje to Vrhovlje pri Kojskem in 1953. The settlement is also known as Vrhuje in the local dialect and humorously as Slepo Vrhovlje (literally, 'blind Vrhovlje'), in contrast to nearby Vrhovlje pri Kožbani (dubbed Gluho Vrhovlje 'deaf Vrhovlje').

== Church ==
The local church is dedicated to Mary Help of Christians and belongs to the Parish of Šmartno.

== Notable people ==
Notable people that were born or lived in Vrhovlje pri Kojskem include:

- Ivan Kovačič (1873–1936), writer and folk poet
