= 63rd Infantry Division "Cirene" =

Infantry division of the Royal Italian Army during World War II

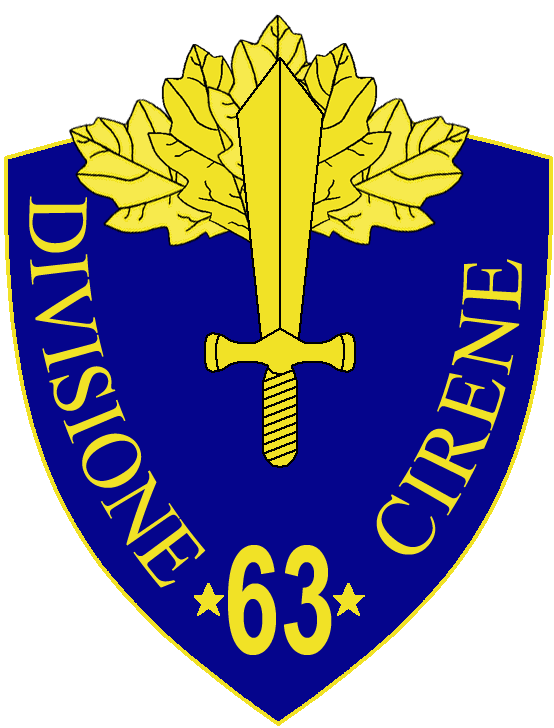
- 63rd Infantry Division "Cirene" insignia
- Active: 1937–1941
- Country: Kingdom of Italy
- Branch: Royal Italian Army
- Type: Infantry
- Size: Division
- Garrison/HQ: Benghazi
- Engagements: World War II

Commanders
- Notable commanders: Gen. D. Carlo Spatocco; Gen. B. Alessandro De Guidi

Insignia
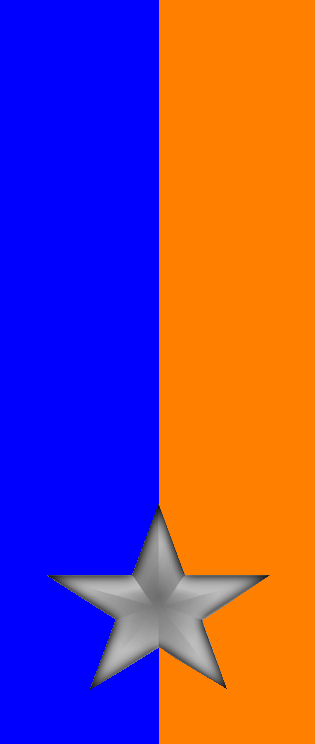
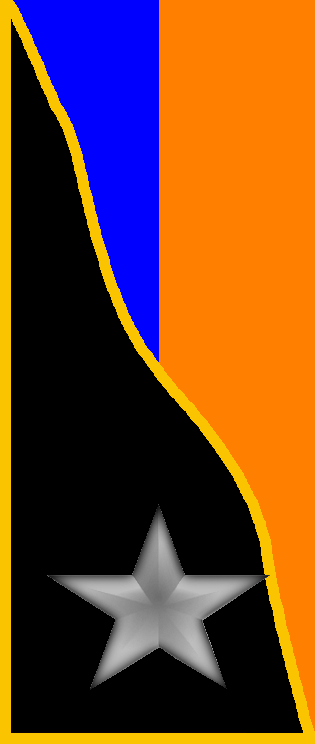
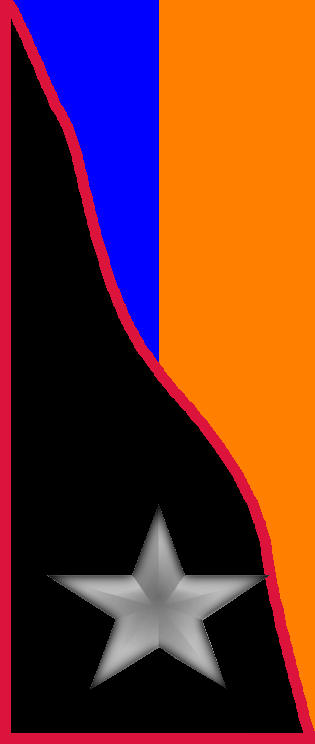
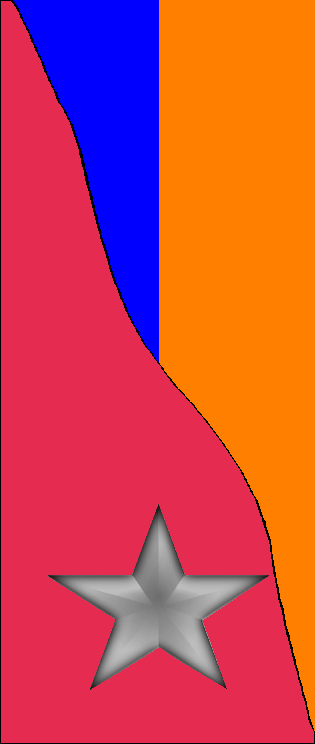
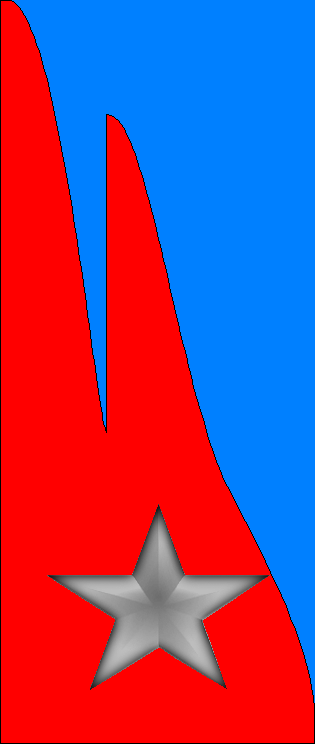
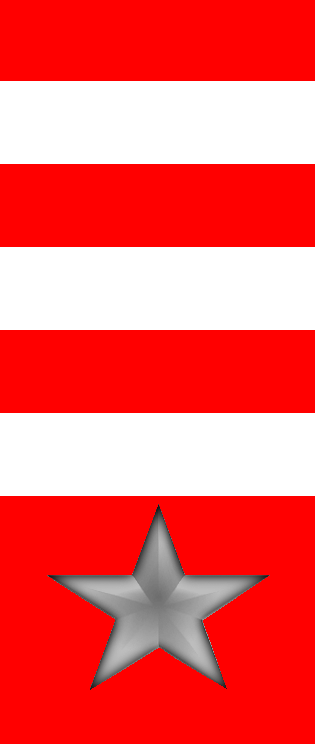
- Identification symbol: Cirene Division gorget patches

The 63rd Infantry Division "Cirene" (Italian: 63ª Divisione di fanteria "Cirene") was an infantry division of the Royal Italian Army during World War II. The division was formed on 1 October 1937 in Benghazi in Italian Libya and named for the nearby antique city of Cyrene (Cirene). The division's regimental depots were in mainland Italy in Liguria and shared with the 37th Infantry Division "Modena", with both divisions recruiting their troops from and training them there. The Cirene was classified as an auto-transportable division, meaning it had some motorized transport, but not enough to move the entire division at once. The division was destroyed on 5 January 1941 during the Battle of Bardia.

== History ==
=== World War I ===
The division's lineage begins with the Brigade "Liguria" established in preparation for Italy's entry into World War I in Genova on 1 March 1915. The brigade consisted of the 157th and 158th infantry regiments, which were manned by reservists from Liguria. The brigade fought on the Italian front and for their conduct the brigade's two infantry regiments were awarded Italy's highest military honor, the Gold Medal of Military Valor. After the war the regiments raised during the war were dissolved, with the exception of those, who had been awarded a Gold Medal of Military Valor.

On 6 November 1926 the brigade command and the 158th Infantry Regiment were disbanded, while the 157th Infantry Regiment "Liguria" was transferred to the XVIII Infantry Brigade.

On 1 October 1937 the 63rd Infantry Division "Cirene" was established in Benghazi in Libya with the 225th Infantry Regiment "Arezzo" from the 24th Infantry Division "Gran Sasso". The same month the 157th Infantry Regiment "Liguria" left the 18th Infantry Division "Metauro" and was transferred to Libya to join the Cirene. The same year the 44th Artillery Regiment was revived in Italy and then transferred to Libya to join the division. On 1 March 1938 the 225th Infantry Regiment "Arezzo" was renamed 158th Infantry Regiment "Liguria".

The division's major units were:

- 63rd Infantry Division "Cirene", in Benghazi
  - 157th Infantry Regiment "Liguria", in Benghazi
  - 158th Infantry Regiment "Liguria", in Marj
  - 45th Artillery Regiment, in Abyar

In 1939 the division's three regiments were renamed "Cirene".

=== World War II ===
Western Desert area

At Italy's entry into World War II on 10 June 1940, the Cirene was at Al Adam (now Tobruk Airport) in the East of Italian Libya. In August 1940 it moved to the Sallum-Bardia area near the border with British Egypt. From 9 September 1940 the Cirene participated in the Italian invasion of Egypt, crossing into Egypt on 13 September and reaching Sidi Barrani on 16 September. Afterwards, the Italian 10th Army formed a defensive line composed of big outposts separated by wide desert areas. At the southern end of the line was the Buqbuq sector, where the Cirene fortified four strong points around a rocky hill near Ābār Abū Safāfī (Bir Sofafi), ‘Alam ar Rābiyah (Alam Rabia), the crossroads at point 236 31°11.33′N 25°33.14′E, the crossroads at Qabr el Mahdi (Qabe Mahdi) and point 226 near Ābār Abū Safāfī (Bir Sofafi). They were separated from the next formation to the north, the Maletti Group by a 30 km (19 mi) gap.

The opening stage of the British offensive Operation Compass is known in Italy as the "Battle of the Marmarica" after the name of the coastal plain where the battle was fought. The British know it as the "Battle of the Camps" after the individual Italian camps set up in a defensive line outside of Sidi Barrani. On 11 December 1940, a patrol from the 7th Support Group entered Rabia to find it empty. The Cirene had withdrawn from there and Ābār Abū Safāfī (Sofafi) overnight. The British 4th Armoured Brigade was ordered to cut them off west of Ābār Abū Safāfī (Sofafi), but arrived too late and the Cirene was able to make its way along the top of the escarpment and link up with Italian forces at Halfaya Pass during the retreat to Sallum.

By 15 December the Italian commander Annibale Bergonzoli at Bardia had approximately 40,000 defenders under his command, but the situation deteriorated rapidly due heavy aerial bombardment and continued Allied ground attacks. The Italian divisions defending the perimeter from Sallum to Bardia included remnants of the Cirene, the 62nd Infantry Division "Marmarica", the 1st CC.NN. Division "23 Marzo", and the 2nd CC.NN. Division "28 Ottobre". At first, the Cirene division guarded the Marsá al Murayghah (Mrega) zone, which was a part of an 18-mile (29 km) perimeter which had a permanent anti-tank ditch, extensive wire fence, and a double row of concrete strong points. But soon British bombardment of the front line has increased to an intolerable level, therefore the bulk of Cirene retreated to Bardia city proper.

On 3 January 1941, the British forces resumed their offensive, starting the Battle of Bardia. As the Allied forces advanced, the Italian units were surrounded, cut off from their supplies and defeated. After some hard fighting, one position after another surrendered. The Australians captured Bardia on 5 January, taking 45,000 prisoners and 462 guns for a loss of 130 dead and 326 wounded of their own. Whenever the Italians choose to fight, the fighting was fierce. An Australian historian later wrote that "in parts their defense was most efficient and often extremely brave". The majority of Italian units have surrendered without fight, their morale sapped by hunger, thirst, lice and dysentery.

== Organization ==
63rd Infantry Division "Cirene" organization in 1940

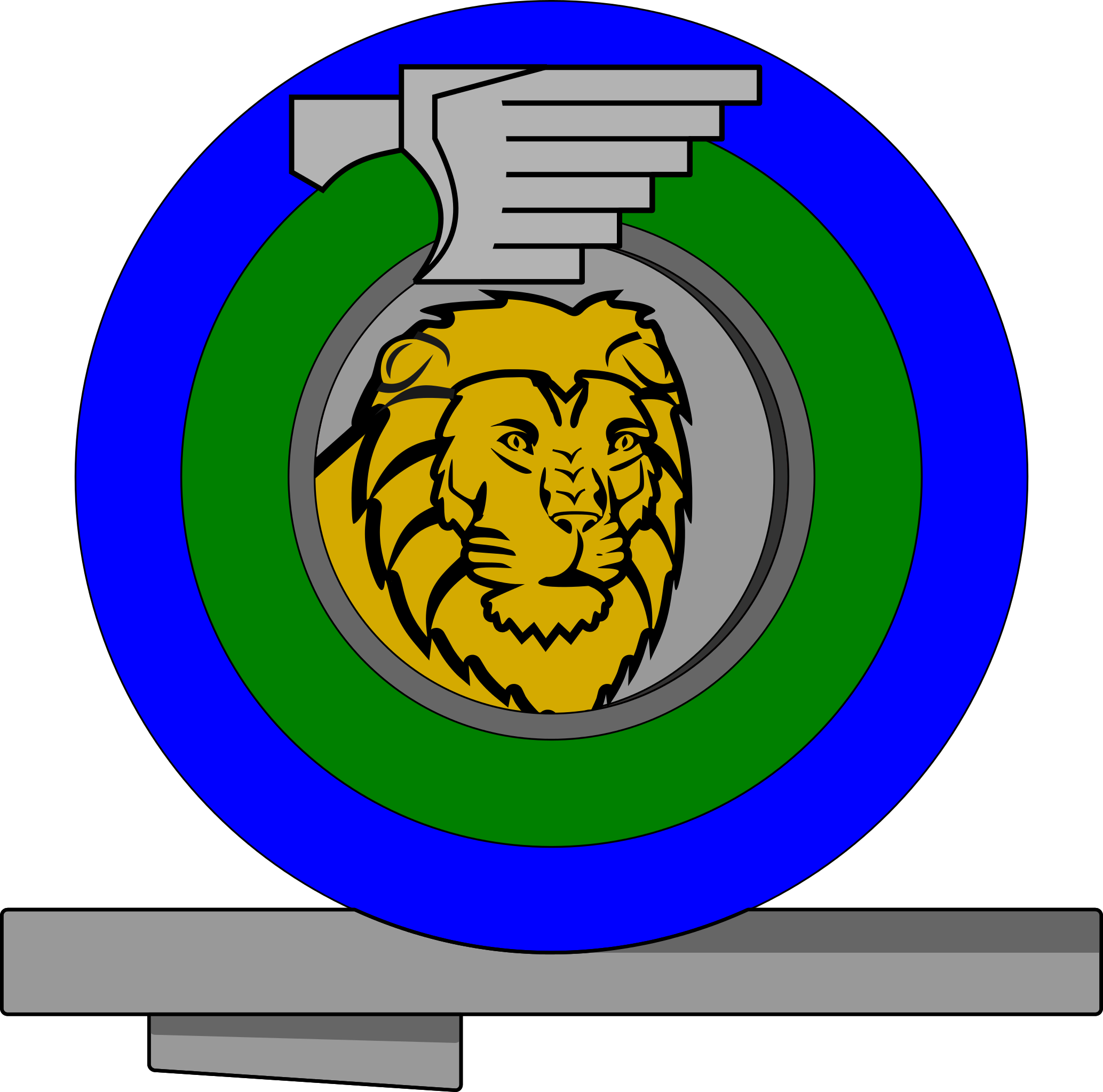
Coat of Arms of the 158th Infantry Regiment "Liguria", 1939

- 63rd Infantry Division "Cirene"
  - Headquarters
    - Command Company
    - 337th Carabinieri Section
    - 338th Carabinieri Section
    - 263rd Field Post Office
    - 63rd Infantry Division Command Transport Squad
  - 157th Infantry Regiment "Cirene" (Note: Named 157th Infantry Regiment "Liguria" until 1939 when the army reorganized its divisions as binary divisions and divisional infantry regiments took the name of the division.)
    - Command Company
    - 3 × Fusilier battalions
    - Support Weapons Battery (65/17 mod. 13 infantry support guns)
    - Mortar Company (81mm mod. 35 mortars)
  - 158th Infantry Regiment "Cirene" (Note: Named 158th Infantry Regiment "Liguria" until 1939 when the army reorganized its divisions as binary divisions and divisional infantry regiments took the name of the division.)
    - Command Company
    - 3 × Fusilier battalions
    - Support Weapons Battery (65/17 mod. 13 infantry support guns)
    - Mortar Company (81mm mod. 35 mortars)
  - 45th Artillery Regiment "Cirene"
    - Command Unit
    - I Group (100/17 mod. 14 howitzers; transferred from the 14th Artillery Regiment "Murge")
    - II Group (75/27 mod. 06 field guns; transferred from the 18th Artillery Regiment "Gran Sasso")
    - III Group (75/27 mod. 06 field guns; transferred from the 2nd Artillery Regiment "Metauro")
    - 63rd Anti-aircraft Battery (20/65 mod. 35 anti-aircraft guns)
    - 263rd Anti-aircraft Battery (20/65 mod. 35 anti-aircraft guns)
    - Ammunition and Supply Unit
  - LXIII Tank Battalion L (L3/35 tankettes; transferred to the 64th Infantry Division "Catanzaro" on 9 December 1940)
  - LXIII Machine Gun Battalion
  - LXIII Mixed Engineer Battalion
    - 63rd Telegraph and Radio Operators Company
    - 1 × Engineer Company
    - 1 × Searchlight Section
  - LXIII Replacements Battalion
  - 63rd Bersaglieri Motorcyclists Company
  - 63rd Anti-tank Company (47/32 mod. 35 anti-tank guns)
  - 27th Medical Section
    - 2 × Field hospitals
    - 1 × Surgical unit
  - 9th Supply Section
  - 63rd Transport Unit

== Military honors ==
For its conduct during the Western Desert campaign the President of Italy awarded on 7 December 1951 to the III Battalion of the 157th Infantry Regiment "Cirene" Italy's highest military honor, the Gold Medal of Military Valor.

- III Battalion/ 157th Infantry Regiment "Cirene" on 7 December 1951

== Commanding officers ==
The division's commanding officers were:

- Generale di Divisione Carlo Spatocco (1 October 1937 - 23 September 1940)
- Generale di Brigata Alessandro De Guidi (24 September 1940 - 5 January 1941)

== Bibliography ==
- Paoletti, Ciro (2008). A Military History of Italy. Greenwood Publishing Group. ISBN 978-0-275-98505-9.
- Churchill, Winston (1949). Their Finest Hour. The Second World War. Vol. 2 (1st ed.). Houghton Mifflin Company.
- Latimer, Jon (2000). Operation Compass 1940: Wavell's Whirlwind Offensive. Oxford: Osprey. ISBN 1-85532-967-0.
- Macksey, Major Kenneth (1971). Beda Fomm: Classic Victory. Ballentine's Illustrated History of the Violent Century, Battle Book Number 22. New York: Ballantine Books. ISBN 0-345-02434-6.
- Mead, Richard (2007). Churchill's Lions: A biographical guide to the key British generals of World War II. Stroud (UK): Spellmount. pp. 544 pages. ISBN 978-1-86227-431-0.
- Playfair, Major-General I.S.O.; with Stitt R.N., Commander G.M.S.; Molony, Brigadier C.J.C. & Toomer, Air Vice-Marshal S.E. (2004) [1st. pub. HMSO 1954]. Butler, J.R.M (ed.). The Mediterranean and Middle East, Volume I The Early Successes Against Italy (to May 1941). History of the Second World War, United Kingdom Military Series. Naval & Military Press. ISBN 1-84574-065-3.
