= Tarabosh =

Mountain in Albania

Tarabosh (Shën Marku)
- Mali i Taraboshit
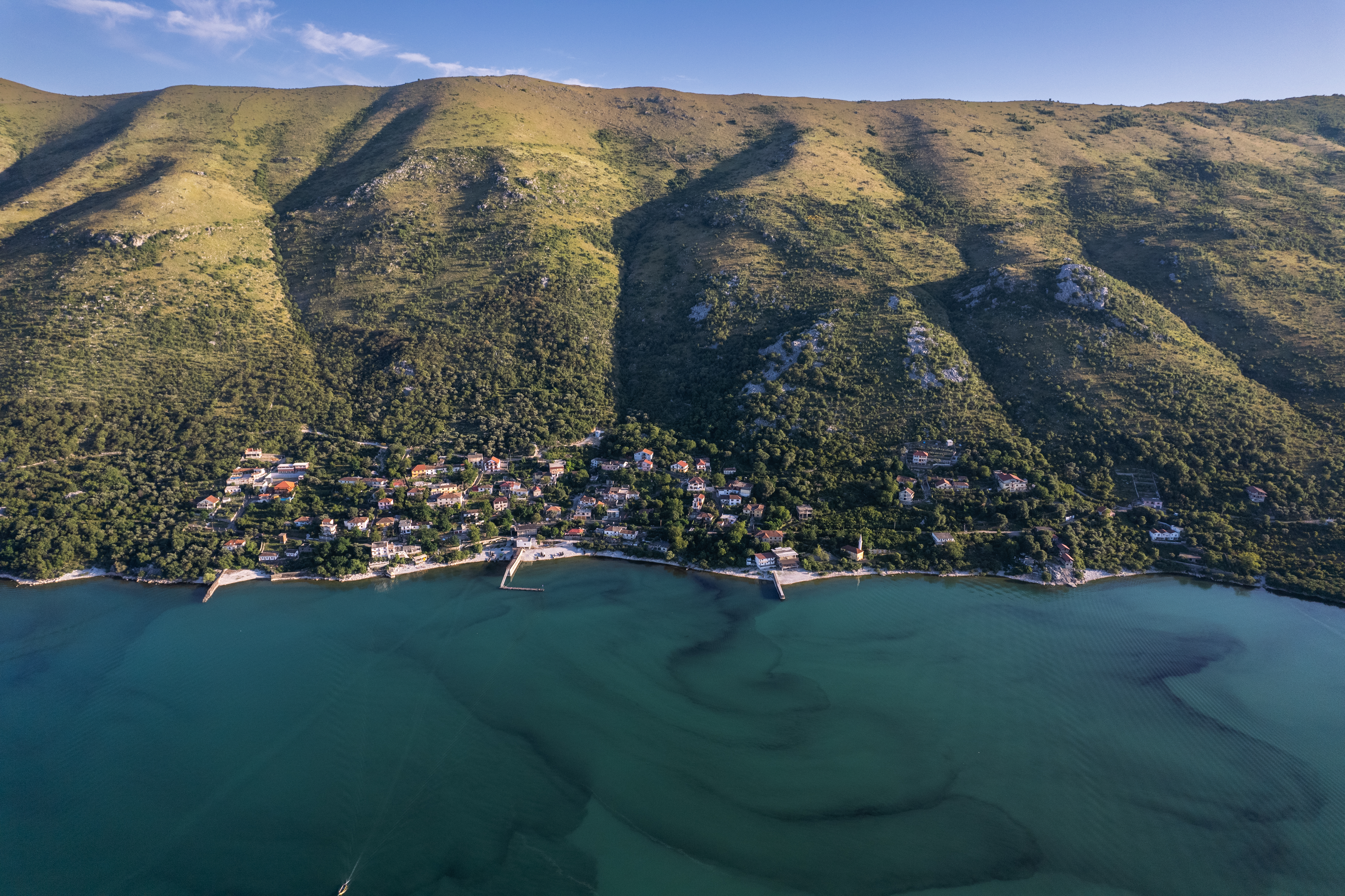
- Tarabosh towering over the lake village of Zogaj

Highest point
- Elevation: 593 m (1,946 ft)
- Prominence: 74 m (243 ft)
- Isolation: 2.5 km (1.6 mi)
- Coordinates: 42°02′47″N 19°26′58″E

Geography
- Location within Albania
- Country: Albania
- Region: Coastal Lowlands
- Municipality: Shkodër
- Parent range: Rumija

Geology
- Rock age: Late Triassic
- Mountain type: mountain
- Rock type(s): limestone, dolomite

Tarabosh (also known as Shën Marku) is a mountain in northwestern Albania, situated along the southwestern margin of Lake Shkodër. Rising to an elevation of 593 m (1,946 ft) above sea level, it forms a prominent relief overlooking the lake and the surrounding lowlands.

== Geography ==
Tarabosh extends between Lake Shkodër to the west and the Buna River plain to the east. Its western flank descends steeply toward the lakeshore, while the terrain on the eastern side declines more gradually toward the Buna lowland. At the foothills of the western slope lie the settlements of Shirokë, a traditional lakeside resort area and Zogaj. To the east, the mountain adjoins the region of Anamal, which constitutes part of the Buna plain.

== Geology ==
Tarabosh is composed primarily of Late Triassic limestones and dolomites. The landform is rugged and uneven, shaped by pronounced karst processes resulting from the dissolution of carbonate rocks. The western slope is heavily influenced by tectonic fracturing and drops abruptly toward Lake Shkodër along the contact zone between limestone formations and flysch–molasse deposits.

== Biodiversity ==
Vegetation is relatively sparse, particularly on the more exposed slopes, due to the rocky substrate and limited soil development. The area has been documented as a breeding ground for the land snail Campylaea dinarica.

== Natural resources ==
The limestone mass of Tarabosh has long been of economic importance, with Albania’s first cement factory established at its base.

During communist rule, a cigarette brand bore the name of the mountain.

== Siege of Scutari ==
As the Siege of Scutari entered its final phase, Montenegrin forces launched repeated assaults against the Ottoman defensive position at Tarabosh, south of the city. Despite prolonged artillery bombardments beginning on 31 March 1913, the attacks were repelled due to strong trench systems, barbed wire, machine-gun fire and effective resistance, while the attackers suffered from ammunition shortages and heavy losses, estimated at about 1,200 casualties. Renewed assaults on April 1st and subsequent fighting led to a prolonged stalemate.

Scutari was eventually handed over later that month, as a result of diplomatic pressure from the Great Powers, who imposed a naval blockade and decided that the city should become part of the newly established state of Albania, prompting the withdrawal of Montenegrin forces in early May.

== See also ==
- List of mountains in Albania
