= Dëshnicë =

- Administrative unit
- Location within Albania
- Coordinates: 40°20′N 20°9′E
- Country: Albania
- County: Gjirokastër
- Municipality: Këlcyrë

Population (2011)
  - Administrative unit: 1,159
- Time zone: UTC+1 (CET)
  - Summer (DST): UTC+2 (CEST)

Dëshnicë is a former municipality in the Gjirokastër County, southern Albania. At the 2015 local government reform it became a subdivision of the municipality Këlcyrë. The population at the 2011 census was 1,159. The municipal unit consists of the villages Beduqas, Tolar, Panarit, Riban, Varibop, Kuqar, Mërtinjë, Xhanaj, Bënjë, Fratar, Senican, Katundishtë, Leskovec, Gërdas and Kodrishtë.
