= 1975 Italian Army reforms =

Restructuring, force reduction, and modernization program

With the 1975 reforms, the Italian Army abolished the regimental level and replaced it with brigades made up of multiple arms (including for example armour, infantry, and artillery). During the reform, the army disbanded 48 regimental commands and reduced its force by 87 battalions. A further ten regimental commands were used to raise ten new brigade commands. Ten training centers, which for traditional reasons had carried the names of regiments, were also disbanded. The reduction in units also allowed to mechanize most of the remaining units in Northern Italy and Italy's defense strategy changed from a hold-at-all-costs territorial defense to one of mobile warfare.

The reform was pushed through by General Andrea Cucino. Having become Chief of the General Staff of the Army on 1 February 1975, Cucino, concerned with the number of under-manned and under-equipped units, ordered an immediate review of the army's structure. After two months, Cucino and his staff presented a plan to restructure the entire army and, having secured an additional 1,100 billion Lire over 10 years to modernize the army's equipment, Cucino ordered the reform to begin on 1 September 1975. By 31 November 1975, the reform concluded and the army's organs, units, doctrine, training, and organization had been thoroughly and radically altered. After the reform, operational units were at 93% readiness, with the Armored Division "Ariete" and the Anti-aircraft Artillery Command at 100% readiness.

== Third Army ==
As a founding member of NATO, Italy was obliged to assign its military forces to NATO's integrated military command in case of war. While the Italian Air Force's operational units would have come under NATO's 5th Allied Tactical Air Force (5 ATAF) in Vicenza, the Italian Army would have come under NATO's Allied Land Forces Southern Europe (LANDSOUTH) in Verona. However, as tensions between Italy and Yugoslavia over the Free Territory of Trieste were high after World War II and as Yugoslavia was not a Warsaw Pact member, a conflict between the two countries would have likely not involved NATO. Therefore, on 1 May 1952, the Italian Army re-activated the Third Army in Padua to be able to act outside NATO's chain of command in case a war would break out between Italy and Yugoslavia. Third Army duplicated the functions of LANDSOUTH with a purely Italian staff. To not violate NATO's integrated military command, Italy described Third Army in all official documents as "the command designated Third Army" (il Comando Designato 3^{a} Armata) and assigned no combat units to it during peacetime.

In case of war, Third Army would have commanded the V Army Corps in Vittorio Veneto and the Carnia-Cadore Troops Command of the IV Alpine Army Corps. The latter command, based in San Daniele del Friuli, had been specifically created to be able to split the IV Alpine Army Corps' area of operation in case of war with Yugoslavia. Reinforcements for Third Army would have come from the III Army Corps in Milan and the VI Army Corps in Bologna.

With the easing of tensions between Italy and Yugoslavia, which culminated in the division of the Free Territory of Trieste with the Treaty of Osimo in 1975, the army disbanded Third Army, along with the VI Army Corps, on 1 April 1972. With the 1975 reform, the last traces of Third Army's existence were eliminated: the Carnia-Cadore Troops Command was disbanded and the support units that had supported the Command Designated Third Army were reassigned or disbanded. Furthermore, the army significantly reduced its forces in the Friuli-Venezia Giulia region along the Yugoslavian-Italian border: 17 regimental commands and 28 battalions were disbanded and a further six regimental commands were transformed into brigade commands. In total, about a third of the pre-reform personnel were withdrawn from the Friuli-Venezia Giulia region as a goodwill gesture to Yugoslavia.

== Personnel and training ==
As part of the reform, the military service length for the army was reduced from 15 to 12 months (Article 40, Law nr. 191, 31 May 1975). Subsequently, the army reduced its personnel strength from 285,000 to 240,000. At the same time, the training of recruits was radically altered. Until 1975, all recruits received their basic training at ten Recruits Training Centers (Centro Addestramento Reclute - CAR) and were assigned only afterwards to their units. With the reform, all higher commands were assigned Recruits Training Battalions (Battaglione Addestramento Reclute - BAR), which trained the recruits assigned to the command's units.

Another part of the reform focused on the selection of the army's squad leaders. Until the reform, squad leaders were chosen prior to their arrival at the army's Recruits Training Centers, based on their army physical and their prior civilian education. Their actually ability to lead a squad was not taken into account. General Cucino ended this practice. Forthwith, the company commanders of the Recruits Training Battalions chose future squad leaders among their best recruits.

== Naming conventions ==
=== Numerals ===
Until the 1975 reform, the army alternated the numbering of its units between Roman numerals and Arabic numerals. With the reform the use of Roman numerals was discontinued. The table below gives an overview of the units of the army and the use of numerals before 1975:

Unit type	Numerals	Commanding officer rank (NATO code)	Notes
Army	Arabic	General (Generale - OF-10)	The army's only active field army, the 3ª Armata, was disbanded on 1 April 1972.
Army Corps, Inspectorate (Ispettorato), Military Region (Regione Militare)	Roman	Lieutenant General (Generale di Corpo d'Armata - OF-8)	Inspectorates and Military Regions were administrative formations.
Division, Troops Command (Comando Truppe), Service Command (Comando del Servizio)	Arabic	Major General (Generale di Divisione - OF-7)	Service Commands were administrative formations.
Brigade	Roman	Brigadier General (Generale di Brigata - OF-6)	
Regiment, Grouping (Raggruppamento)	Arabic	Colonel (Colonnello - OF-5)	Groupings were administrative formations.
Battalion, Group, Squadrons Group, Unit (Reparto)	Roman	Lieutenant Colonel (Tenente Colonnello - OF-4)	Units were an administrative formations of 2-3 companies.
Company, Battery, Squadron	Arabic	Captain (Capitano - OF-2)	

=== Brigades ===
With the reform, the army raised ten new brigades and named them, depending on the division they were assigned to, by different conventions:

- The Armored Division "Centauro" was split into two brigades, which both were named for battles fought in Lombardy during the First Italian War of Independence:
  - 3rd Mechanized Brigade "Goito", named for the Battle of Goito
  - 31st Armored Brigade "Curtatone", named for the Battle of Curtatone

The two brigades were joined by the Mechanized Brigade "Legnano", which was named for the World War II 58th Infantry Division "Legnano", which in turn had been named for the medieval Battle of Legnano fought between the Lombard League and Holy Roman Emperor Frederick Barbarossa.

- The Armored Division "Ariete" was split into three brigades, which were named for heroes of the Revolutions of 1848 in the Italian states:
  - 8th Mechanized Brigade "Garibaldi" named to honor Giuseppe Garibaldi, who led the military forces of the Republic of Rome
  - 32nd Armored Brigade "Mameli" named to honor Goffredo Mameli, who wrote the national anthem of Italy and died during the 1849 Siege of Rome
  - 132nd Armored Brigade "Manin" named to honor Daniele Manin, who was the president of the Republic of San Marco
- The Mechanized Division "Folgore" consisted of three brigades after the reform: two named for World War I battles, and a pre-existing brigade, named for a World War II division, which had distinguished itself during the Western Desert campaign:
  - Mechanized Brigade "Gorizia", named for the Battle of Gorizia
  - Armored Brigade "Vittorio Veneto", named for the Battle of Vittorio Veneto
- The two brigades were joined by the Mechanized Brigade "Trieste", which was named for the World War II 101st Motorised Division "Trieste"
- The Mechanized Division "Mantova" consisted of three brigades after the reform: a new one named for a World War I battle, a pre-existing brigade named for a World War I battle, and a new brigade, named after a World War II division, which had distinguished itself during the Western Desert campaign:
  - Mechanized Brigade "Isonzo", named after the World War II 14th Infantry Division "Isonzo", which in turn had been named for the Battles of the Isonzo
  - Mechanized Brigade "Brescia", named after the World War II 27th Infantry Division "Brescia"
- The two brigades were joined by the Armored Brigade "Pozzuolo del Friuli", named for the World War I Battle of Pozzuolo.

The tenth new brigade was the Motorized Brigade "Acqui", named after the World War II 33rd Infantry Division "Acqui".

=== Battalions and groups ===
In 1975, newly independent battalions and groups were given a name, battle flag, and coat of arms. These names, flags, and coats of arms are still in use today. The naming convention introduced in 1975 is as follows:

==== Infantry ====
Each speciality of the infantry developed its own naming convention.

The three Granatieri (Grenadier) battalions were named for two battles, where the Granatieri had withstood overwhelming enemy numbers, and for the oldest regiment of their line:

- 1st Mechanized Granatieri Battalion "Assietta", named for the War of the Austrian Succession Battle of Assietta, where in 1747 the Granatieri stopped the French invasion of Piedmont
- 2nd Mechanized Granatieri Battalion "Cengio", named for the World War I battle of Monte Cengio, where in 1916 the Granatieri stopped the Austro-Hungarian Asiago offensive
- 3rd Granatieri Battalion "Guardie" (Recruits Training), named for the Guards Regiment (Reggimento delle Guardie) raised in 1659

Line infantry regiments already carried names before the reform and mostly retained them. The newly independent line infantry battalions, which changed their names, did so because:

- in one case a division with same name existed (114th Infantry Regiment "Mantova" - Mechanized Division "Mantova")
- in six cases the regiment was part of a brigade with the same name (i.e. 17th Infantry Regiment "Acqui" - Motorized Brigade "Acqui", 67th Infantry Regiment "Legnano" - Mechanized Brigade "Legnano")
- in six cases because the regiment's sister regiment was also active with the same name (i.e. 59th Infantry Regiment "Calabria" - 60th Infantry Regiment "Calabria", 151st Infantry Regiment "Sassari"- 152nd Infantry Regiment "Sassari")
- in two cases because an artillery regiment carried the same name (33rd Infantry Regiment "Livorno" - 28th Artillery Regiment "Livorno", 120th Infantry Regiment "Emilia" - 155th Artillery Regiment "Emilia")
- in two cases because a brigade with the same name existed and because the regiment's sister regiment was already active with the same name: 21st Infantry Regiment "Cremona" - 22nd Infantry Regiment "Cremona" - Motorized Brigade"Cremona".
- in the case of the reactivated 1st Infantry Regiment "Re" ("King"), because the army did not want the unit to carry a royal title. For the same reason the 9th Infantry Regiment "Regina" ("Queen") had been renamed 9th Infantry Regiment "Bari" in 1947.

All newly independent infantry battalions, with the exception of six, were named for battles where the antecedent regiment had distinguished itself. The six battalions were renamed, in one case for the patron saint of the city where the unit was based (1st Motorized Infantry Battalion "San Giusto"), in one case for a quarter of the city, which was the unit's former title (33rd Infantry Fortification Battalion "Ardenza"), in one case for a historic event that had occurred in the area of the regiment's former title (74th Infantry Fortification Battalion "Pontida"). In the remaining three cases for the historic name of the region surrounding the unit's base from where it drew its recruits: 45th Infantry Battalion "Arborea", 47th Infantry Battalion "Salento", 91st Infantry Battalion "Lucania".

Bersaglieri regiments and battalions had not carried names before the reform and the newly independent battalions were named, with two exceptions, for battles. The 1st Bersaglieri Battalion was named for the founder of the Bersaglieri corps General Alessandro Ferrero La Marmora, while the 11th Battalion, which had received the flag of the 182nd Regiment "Garibaldi", was named for the island of Caprera, where Giuseppe Garibaldi had spent the last years of his life.

Alpini battalions and the associated mountain artillery groups had been recruited in the Alpine valleys of Northern Italy and were named since 1887 for the location of their main depot. With the 1975 reform Alpini battalions and mountain artillery groups became independent under their historic names.

Armor battalions were named for officers, soldiers and partisans, who were posthumously awarded Italy's highest military honor the Gold Medal of Military Valor for heroism during World War II. Similarly the two mechanized Carabinieri battalions were named for Carabinieri officers, who were posthumously awarded the Gold Medal of Military Valor. I.e. 13th Tank Battalion "M.O. Pascucci".

Paracadutisti (Paratroopers) battalions were named for World War II battles: Second Battle of El Alamein, Air Assault of Poggio Rusco, and one battalion was named for the location of the first Italian military parachute school Tarquinia. The Paratroopers Assault Battalion was named for the World War I conquest of the summit of Col Moschin by its predecessor regiment.

The infantry's youngest speciality the Lagunari fielded two battalions after the reform:

- 1st Lagunari Battalion "Serenissima", named for the honorary title of the Republic of Venice
- Amphibious Vehicles Battalion "Sile", named for the Sile river, which flows into the Venetian lagoon and was the location of heavy combat between Austro-Hungarian and Italian forces in 1918.

==== Cavalry ====
During the reform, two cavalry squadron groups were reactivated and both, as all already active squadron groups, retained their traditional names. Two squadron groups retained their names based on former Kingdom of Sardinia possession in France: "Nizza Cavalleria" named for the County of Nice and "Savoia Cavalleria" named for the Duchy of Savoy. One squadrons group retained its name based on the Second Italian War of Independence Battle of Montebello, one squadrons group retained its title as the guides ("Guide") of the army, while the remainder of the squadron groups retained their names, which were derived from Italian regions (i.e. "Piemonte Cavalleria") or cities (i.e. "Lancieri di Novara").

==== Artillery ====
The artillery remained divided into the following specialities:

- da campagna - Field Artillery (includes also da campagna semovente (self-propelled field artillery) and da campagna paracadutisti (paratroopers field artillery)): groups of this type were maneuver elements of brigade-level units and were given flags and names of former divisional artillery regiments.
- pesante campale - Heavy Field Artillery (includes also pesante campale semovente (heavy self-propelled field artillery)): regiments and groups of this type were support elements of divisions or corps; the first were given flags of former divisional artillery regiments, while the latter received flags of former army corps artillery regiments.
- pesante - Heavy Artillery (includes also pesante semovente (heavy self-propelled artillery)): groups of this type were tasked with army-level strategic nuclear fire and were given, with the exception of the 27th Heavy Self-propelled Artillery Regiment, flags of former army artillery regiments. The 27th Artillery Regiment was originally a field artillery regiment, which had become a Heavy Artillery unit over time, which still retained its Field Artillery flag.
- da montagna - Mountain Artillery: groups of this type were maneuver elements of Alpine brigades.
- controaerei - Anti-aircraft Artillery.
- a cavallo - Horse Artillery: the only regiment of this type was organized as a Heavy Field Artillery regiment.

Most artillery units retained the names of the former regiments, whose flags they were given. The units, which changed their names, did so because:

- in two because cases a division with same name existed (131st Artillery Regiment "Centauro" - Armored Division "Centauro", 132nd Artillery Regiment "Ariete" - Armored Division "Ariete")
- in one cases a division and a brigade with same name existed (185th Paratroopers Artillery Regiment "Folgore" - Mechanized Division "Folgore" - Paratroopers Brigade "Folgore")
- in five cases a brigade with the same name existed (i.e. 7th Artillery Regiment "Cremona" - Motorized Brigade "Cremona", 35th Artillery Regiment "Friuli" - Motorized Brigade "Friuli").
- in eight cases because an infantry regiment carried the same name (183rd Infantry Regiment "Nembo" - 184th Artillery Regiment "Nembo")
- and in the case of the 120th Self-propelled Field Artillery Group "Po" name had to be chosen as the preceding unit was simply known as 120th Motorized Regiment.

Unlike the other service arms of the army the artillery did not follow a unified naming convention. Which led to units being named for battles (3rd "Pastrengo", 13th "Magliana", 184th "Filottrano"), rivers (1st "Adige", 10th "Avisio"), mountains (i.e. 4th "Bondone"), landscapes (i.e. 14th "Murge", 47th "Gargano"), cities (i.e. 33rd "Terni", 132nd "Rovereto"), bridges (19th "Rialto"), and World War II divisions (120th "Po"). However light anti-aircraft reserve groups were named systematically for birds of prey.

==== Engineers ====
Engineer battalions were named for a lake if they supported a corps or named for a river if they supported a division or brigade: i.e. the 5th Pioneers Battalion "Bolsena" supported the 5th Army Corps, while the 104th Pioneers Battalion "Torre" supported the Mechanized Division "Mantova". In the case of the 184th Pioneers Battalion "Santerno" the name was chosen to also commemorate the CLXXXIV Engineer Battalion's role in crossing the river Santerno during the allied 1945 Spring offensive.

==== Signals ====
Signal battalions were named for mountain passes, with the exception of the two Southernmost units, which were named for volcanoes.

Named for passes: 4th Signal Battalion "Gardena", 33rd Electronic Warfare Battalion "Falzarego"; named for volcanoes: 45th Signal Battalion "Vulture" and 46th Signal Battalion "Mongibello".

==== Army aviation ====
Army aviation units were new creations and named for celestial objects:

- Groupings were numbered with a single digit and named for stars: i.e. the 5th Army Light Aviation Grouping "Rigel" was named for the brightest star in the Orion constellation. Accordingly, the coat of arms of aviation units highlight the name-giving star within its constellation. Aviation support units elevated to regiment in the 1990s were named for the constellation of the aviation regiment they supported: i.e. the support regiment of the 5th Army Aviation Regiment "Rigel" was named 2nd Army Aviation Support Regiment "Orione".
- Squadron groups were numbered with two digits and named for constellations, and planets of the Solar System. When possible the names were chosen to relate to a unit's location or its superior unit: i.e. the 34th Squadrons Group formed in 1986 from squadrons based in Turin was named "Toro" (Italian for bull) as the symbol of Turin is a rampant bull. The 46th Squadrons Group of the "Centauro" division was named "Sagittario", as this constellation is commonly represented by a centaur pulling-back a bow, which is also the division's symbol. Furthermore, the numbers assigned to squadron groups were specified as:
  - 10-19 for medium transport helicopters squadron groups (Elicotteri da Trasporto Medio - ETM)
  - 20-39 for light airplanes and helicopters squadron groups (Aerei Leggeri e Elicotteri - ALE)
  - 40-49 for reconnaissance helicopters squadron groups (Elicotteri da Ricognizione - ERI)
  - 50-59 for multirole helicopters squadron groups (Elicotteri Multiruolo - EM)

If a squadrons group was part of a regiment the second digit of its number corresponded to the number of the regiment. I.e. the 44th Squadrons Group was a reconnaissance helicopter unit assigned to the 4th Army Aviation Regiment "Altair".

==== Transport and materiel ====
Transport groups were named for Roman roads near their bases: i.e. 10th Joint Forces Maneuver Auto Group "Salaria" and the 11th Maneuver Auto Group "Flaminia", both based in Rome, were named for Roman roads starting in Rome.

Logistic battalions were named for the division or brigade they were assigned to. In 1986 logistic units supporting the army corps were given the names of landscapes in the corps' area of operations (i.e. "Carnia", "Carso", "Dolomiti").

==== History ====
This naming convention is still in force and newly created units' names adhere to it:

- 1 October 1983: 51st Pioneer Battalion "Simeto" in Palermo, named for the Simeto river in Southern Sicily.
- 13 July 1987: 10th Transport Battalion "Appia" in Naples, named for the Roman road Via Appia.
- 5 July 1996: 7th Attack Helicopters Regiment "Vega" in Casarsa della Delizia, named for Vega - the brightest star in the Lyra constellation.
- 24 January 2005: Battalion "Nemi" of the 6th Pioneer Regiment in Rome, named for lake Nemi in Lazio.

== Flags and coat of arms ==
For the first time, the Italian Army allowed units below the regimental level to carry a flag ("bandiera di guerra"). With the presidential decrees n. 846 of 12 November 1976 and n. 173 of 14 March 1977 the newly raised units were officially assigned their names and either assigned an existing flag or granted a newly created one:

- Granatieri, Bersaglieri, cavalry, line infantry, field artillery, heavy artillery, anti-air artillery, engineer, and Paracadutisti battalions and groups were assigned flags of regiments disbanded during the reform or flags of non-active regiments, whose flags had been stored at Shrine of the Flags (Sacrario delle Bandiere) in the Vittoriano in Rome.
- Alpini, Lagunari, signal, mountain artillery, tank, and armored battalions and groups exceeded the number of pre-existing regiments and therefore were assigned a mix of existing flags and newly created flags.
- Aviation, logistic, Carabinieri and transport units were given flags for the first time and their flags were all of new creation.

In total, 92 stored and 80 newly created flags were given to the units raised during the reform. With the flags these units also acquired the right to display a coat of arms. This required the army's heraldry office to design 80 new coat of arms and update the other 92, many of which had not been modified since the time of fascism and furthermore did not take the unit's World War II service into account.

== Equipment ==
The reduction of forces allowed the army to retire old equipment and invest in new gear. The first priority was to improve the anti-tank capabilities of infantry units by speeding up the introduction of the BGM-71 TOW anti-tank guided missiles and ordering another 10,000 missiles.

While the army had already bought 200 Leopard 1A2 main battle tanks and 69 Bergepanzer 2 armored recovery vehicles from Germany in 1971 and 1972 to equip the Cavalry Brigade "Pozzuolo del Friuli", in 1974 the army ordered an additional 400 license-built Leopard 1A2 and 67 Bergepanzer 2 from OTO-Melara to replace M47 Patton tanks and M74 armored recovery vehicles in units stationed in Northern Italy. In total, the army reduced the number of M47 tanks in service by about 900.

Unhappy with the protection level of the standard M113 armored personnel carrier, the army ordered the same year 600 VCC-1 Camillino with improved armor and a M2 Browning machine gun for its armored and mechanized brigades. As the amphibious LVT-4 of the Lagunari Regiment were obsolete the army ordered 17 LVTP-7 as replacement (15 × LVTP-7, 1 × LVTP-7C command post, 1 × LVTP-7R recovery vehicle). For the artillery 164 FH70 towed howitzers were ordered, while the last M7 Priest, M55 and M14/61 howitzers were retired. In total the army reduced the number of howitzers in service by about 450. The artillery's MGR-1 Honest John surface-to-surface missiles were replaced with MGM-52 Lance missiles, while its MQM-57 "Falconer" drones were replaced by Canadair CL-89B "Midge" drones.

The Army's Light Aviation had received its first CH-47C Chinook transport helicopter in February 1973; by 1975, the first operational unit could be formed and all 24 Chinook were in service by October 1977. In the same year, the first of 80 SM.1019A artillery observation and liaison plane entered service and began to replace the L-18C Super Cub and L-21B Super Cub planes, which were finally taken out of service in 1979 and 1980 respectively.

== Symbols ==
- -> = "changed to"
- --> = "assigned to"
- ʘ-> = "moved to"

== Army General Staff ==
- Army General Staff (Stato Maggiore dell'Esercito (SME)), in Rome
  - Chief of the Army General Staff
    - Deputy Chief of the Army General Staff
    - I Department (Operations, Training and Regulations, Studies)
    - II Department (Organization, Services, Transport, Research and Studies)
    - Operative Informations and Situation Service (SIOS)
    - Personnel Secretariat
    - Administration
  - Medical Service, in Rome
    - Military Medicine School, in Florence
      - Training and Studies Office
      - Complement Officer Cadets / Specialized Cadets Unit
      - Administrative Service
      - Special Infirmary
    - Military Medicine Studies and Research Center, in Rome
  - Military Veterinary Service, in Rome
    - Military Veterinary Service School, in Pinerolo
    - Military Veterinary Service Studies Center, in Rome
    - Quadrupeds Infirmary, in Pinerolo
    - Quadrupeds Infirmary, in Meran
    - Quadrupeds Infirmary, in Udine
    - Quadrupeds Rearing Post, in Grosseto
  - Automotive Service, in Rome
    - Secretariat and Personnel Office -> Office of the Chief (Secretariat and Personnel, Studies and Regulations, Training and Organization)
    - Regulation, Organization and Training Office -> disbanded
    - Motorization Schools Command, in Rome-Cecchignola
      - Command Unit, in Rome-Cecchignola
      - Automotive Service Application School, in Rome-Cecchignola -> Automotive Service Application School
      - Motorization Specialists School, in Rome-Cecchignola -> Motorization Specialists School
      - Motorization Mechanics and Drivers School, in Rome-Cecchignola -> Motorization Mechanics School
      - Maneuver Auto Group, in Rome-Cecchignola
      - Medium Workshop, in Rome-Cecchignola
    - X Auto Group, in Rome -> 10th Joint Forces Maneuver Auto Group "Salaria" (granted a new flag)
    - XI Maneuver Auto Group, in Rome -> 11th Maneuver Auto Group "Flaminia" (granted a new flag)
  - Military Commissariat Service, in Rome
    - Military Commissariat and Administration Services School, in Maddaloni
      - Command Company, in Maddaloni -> Command and Services Company
      - I Courses Unit (Commissariat), in Maddaloni -> 1st Specialized Cadets Battalion
      - II Courses Unit (Administration), in Maddaloni > disbanded
      - III Experimental Unit, in Maddaloni -> 3rd Experimental Battalion
      - IV Specialized Cadets Unit, in Nocera Inferiore -> 2nd Specialized Cadets Battalion
  - Military Administration Service, in Rome
  - Artillery Technical Service, in Rome
  - Engineering Technical Service, in Rome
  - Signal Technical Service, in Rome
  - Motorization Technical Service, in Rome
  - Chemical-Physical Technical Service, in Rome
  - Geographic Technical Service, in Rome
    - Military Geographical Institute, in Florence
  - War School, in Civitavecchia
  - Military Academy, in Modena
  - Arms Application Schools Command, in Turin -> Application School
    - Infantry and Cavalry Application School, in Turin -> disbanded
    - Artillery Application School, in Turin -> disbanded
    - Engineering Application School, in Turin -> disbanded
  - "Nunziatella" Military School, in Naples
  - Non-commissioned Officers Cadets School, in Viterbo
  - Army Foreign Languages School, in Rome

=== Infantry and Cavalry Inspectorate ===
- Infantry and Cavalry Inspectorate, in Rome
  - Secretariat and Personnel Office -> 1st Office: Secretariat, Organization, and Personnel
  - Training, Regulations, Schools Office -> 2nd Office: Schools Training and Regulations; Schools Courses and Materials
  - Studies and Experiences Office -> disbanded
  - General Officer Divisional Infantry -> General Officer for motorized, alpine, parachute, and fortification infantry units
    - Infantry School, in Cesano
      - Command Unit, in Cesano -> Command and Services Company
      - Cadets Battalion, in Cesano
      - Infantry Complement Officer Cadets School, in Ascoli Piceno -> 235th Infantry Battalion "Piceno" (Recruits Training) (assigned the flag of the 235th Infantry Regiment "Piceno") --> Comando Artiglieria Controaerei dell'Esercito
      - Infantry Complement Non-commissioned Officers Cadets School, in Spoleto
    - Equestrian Military School, in Montelibretti
  - General Officer Alpine Troops -> disbanded
    - Alpine Military School (SMALP), in Aosta
      - Command Unit, in Aosta -> Command and Services Company
      - Cadets Battalion, in Aosta
      - Alpine Troops Skiers Group, in Aosta
      - Light Aviation Unit (SMALP), at Pollein Heliport -> 545th Multirole Helicopters Squadron / 54th Multirole Helicopters Squadrons Group "Cefeo" / 4th Army Aviation Regiment "Altair"
  - General Officer Parachute Troops -> disbanded
    - Parachuting Military School, in Pisa
      - Command Unit, in Pisa -> Command and Services Company
      - Paratrooper Recruits Training Battalion "Folgore", in Pisa -> 3rd Paratroopers Battalion "Poggio Rusco" (Recruits Training) (assigned the flag of the 185th Paratroopers Regiment "Folgore") --> Paratroopers Brigade "Folgore"
      - new: Cadets Battalion, in Pisa
  - General Officer Armored Troops -> General Officer for mechanized and armored units of infantry and cavalry
    - Mechanized and Armored Troops School (SCUTMEC), in Caserta -> Armored Troops School
      - Command Unit, in Caserta -> Command and Services Company
      - Cadets Battalion, in Caserta
      - Tank Training Battalion, in Caserta -> Tank-Armored Battalion
      - Mechanized and Armored Troops Squad Commanders Cadets School, in Lecce -> Armored Troops Specialists School
      - Light Aviation Unit SCUTMEC, at Pontecagnano Airport -> merged into the 20th Light Airplanes and Helicopters Squadrons Group "Andromeda"
  - Physical Education Military School, in Orvieto
    - 1st Athletes Company, in Rome
    - 2nd Athletes Company, in Naples
    - 3rd Athletes Company, in Bologna

=== Artillery Inspectorate ===
- Artillery Inspectorate, in Rome -> Artillery and NBC-defense Inspectorate
  - Secretariat and Personnel Office
  - Studies, Regulations, Schools Office -> disbanded
  - General Officer Field Artillery
    - Field Artillery Office
    - Artillery School, in Bracciano
      - Command Unit, in Bracciano
      - VIII Army Corps Self-propelled Field Artillery Group, in Bracciano -> 1st Self-propelled Field Artillery Group "Cacciatori delle Alpi" (assigned the flag of the 1st Artillery Regiment "Cacciatori delle Alpi")
      - Artillery Officer and Non-Commissioned Officer Cadets School, in Foligno
      - Complement Officer Cadets Group, in Bracciano
      - Logistic Unit, in Bracciano
  - General Officer Anti-aircraft Artillery
    - Anti-aircraft Artillery Office
    - Anti-aircraft Artillery School, in Sabaudia
      - Command Unit, in Sabaudia
      - I Anti-aircraft Artillery Group, in Sabaudia
      - Cadets Group, in Sabaudia
      - Logistic Unit, in Sabaudia
    - Artillery Electronic Technicians School, in Rome -> disbanded

=== Engineering Inspectorate ===
- Engineering Inspectorate, in Rome
  - Secretariat and Personnel Office
  - I Office: Regulations, Training and Schools -> Training and Studies Office
  - II Office: Studies and Experiences -> Research and Army General Staff Studies Office
  - III Office: Works and Property -> Works and Property Office
  - General Officer Engineering -> Deputy-Inspector Engineering
    - Pioneer Engineering School, in Rome-Cecchignola -> Engineering School
      - new: Command and Services Company, in Rome-Cecchignola
      - I Courses Battalion, in Rome-Cecchignola -> 1st Complement Officer Cadets Battalion
      - II Specialized Cadets Battalion, in Rome-Cecchignola -> 2nd Specialized Cadets Battalion
      - III Specialized Cadets Battalion, in Rome-Cecchignola -> 3rd Specialized Cadets Battalion
      - IV Training Battalion, in Rome-Cecchignola -> 4th Pioneer Cadets Battalion

=== Signal Inspectorate ===
- Signal Inspectorate, in Rome
  - Secretariat and Personnel Office
  - I Office: Studies, Regulations, Materiels, and Electronic Warfare -> Training and Studies Office
  - II Office: Plans, Procedures, and Cypher -> Plans, Procedures, and Cypher Office
  - III Office: Telecommunications -> Telecommunications Office
    - X Signal Battalion, in Rome (supports the Defense Ministry -> 10th Signal Battalion "Lanciano" (assigned the flag of the 3rd Engineer Regiment (Telegraphers))
    - XI Signal Battalion, in Bologna -> 11th Signal Battalion "Leonessa" (granted a new flag) ʘ-> Civitavecchia
  - Armed Forces Telecommunications School, in Chiavari
    - new: Command and Services Company, in Chiavari
    - Cadets Battalion, in Chiavari
  - General Officer Signals -> Deputy-Inspector Signals
    - Signal School, in Rome-Cecchignola
      - new: Command and Services Company, in Rome-Cecchignola
      - I Courses Battalion, in Rome-Cecchignola -> 1st Complement Officer Cadets Battalion
      - II Specialized Cadets Battalion, in Rome-Cecchignola -> 2nd Specialized Cadets Battalion
      - III Specialized Cadets Battalion, in Rome-Cecchignola -> 3rd Specialized Cadets Battalion
    - Electronic Defense Center, in Anzio (granted a new flag)
      - IX Electronic Warfare Battalion, in Anzio -> 9th Electronic Warfare Battalion "Rombo" (granted a new flag)
      - SIGINT Unit, in Anzio -> 8th Signals Intelligence Battalion "Tonale" (granted a new flag)
    - Signal Specialists School, in San Giorgio a Cremano

=== NBC-defense Inspectorate ===
- NBC-defense Inspectorate, in Rome -> disbanded
  - Secretariat and Personnel Office
  - Civil Protection Support Advisory and Study Cell
  - NBC-Defense Department -> disbanded
    - Studies, Regulations, Training Office
    - Technical Instruction, Equipment Loads Office
    - NBC-Network Control Center Cell
    - Atomic Coordination Section
  - Armed Forces Atomic, Biological, Chemical Defense School, in Rieti -> Armed Forces Nuclear, Biological, Chemical Defense School --> Artillery and NBC-defense Inspectorate
  - NBC-defense Battalion, in Rieti -> 1st NBC Battalion "Etruria" (assigned the flag of the Chemical Regiment) --> Artillery and NBC-defense Inspectorate

=== Army Logistic Inspectorate ===
- Army Logistic Inspectorate, in Rome
  - Secretariat and Personnel Section
  - Coordination Office
  - Statistics-Data Processing-Coordination Office (STAMECO)
  - Studies Office
  - Arms, Ammunition, and NBC-defense Materiel Office
  - Engineering and Signal Materiel Office
  - Army Light Aviation Materiel Office
  - new: Supply Programs Office
  - new: Logistic Organization Office
  - Commissariat Materiel Office (coordinates with the Military Commissariat Service)
  - Motorization Materiel Office (coordinates with the Automotive Service)
  - Medical Materiel Office (coordinates with the Medical Service)
  - Veterinary Service Materiel Section (coordinates with the Military Veterinary Service)
  - Army Arsenal, in Naples
  - Army Arsenal, in Piacenza
  - Arms Factory, in Terni -> in 1978: Light Armament Military Plant
  - Army Fuse Factory, in Torre Annunziata -> Terrestrial Ammunition Military Plant (Fuses Division)
  - Army Pyrotechnics, in Capua -> Detached Section (Pyrotechnics Division) --> Terrestrial Ammunition Military Plant
  - Army Powder Factory, in Fontana Liri
  - Amy Precision Laboratory, in Rome -> in 1978: Electronic and Precision Materiels Military Plant
  - Projecticles Filling Laboratory, in Madonna di Baiano -> Terrestrial Ammunition Military Plant
    - Detached Section, in Noceto
  - 21st Signal Plant, in Rome -> in 1978: Military Engineering Plant
  - 22nd Military Engineering Plant, in Pavia -> in 1978: Military Engineering Plant
  - NBC-defense Materiel Directorate, in Rome -> NBC-defense Materiel Military Plant
  - Military Chemical-Pharmaceutical Institute, in Florence -> in 1978: Chemical-Pharmaceutical Military Plant
  - Army Tractor Repairs Workshop, in Piacenza -> in 1978: Detached Section Combat Vehicles Plant (Bologna) --> Combat Vehicles Plant
  - Armored Vehicles Repairs Workshop, in Bologna -> in 1978: Combat Vehicles Plant
  - Armored Vehicles Repairs Workshop, in Nola -> in 1978: Combat Vehicles Plant
  - Graphic Workshop, in Gaeta -> Graphic Military Plant
  - new: Arms and Ammunition Military Technical Center, in Rome
  - Artillery Experiences Center, in Nettuno
  - Engineering Technical Center, in Rome -> Engineering Military Technical Center
  - Signal Technical Center, in Rome -> Signals Military Technical Center
  - Commissariat Technical Center, in Turin -> Commissariat Military Technical Center
  - Motorization Studies and Experiences Center, in Rome -> in 1978: Motorization Military Technical Center
  - Vehicles and Spares Supply Center, in Turin
  - Army Aero-photographic Reproduction Center, in Villafranca di Verona
  - Chemical, Physical, and Biological Technical Center, in Rome -> NBC-defense Military Technical Center ʘ-> Civitavecchia
  - new: 4th Light Army Aviation Repairs Battalion, at Viterbo Airport

=== Office of the Inspector of Army Light Aviation ===
- Office of the Inspector of Army Light Aviation, in Rome -> Army Light Aviation Inspectorate
  - Secretariat and Personnel Office
  - I Flight-cooperation Office -> disbanded
  - II Training, Courses, Flight Safety, and Personnel Office -> disbanded
  - III Army Light Aviation Materiel and Experiences Office -> disbanded
  - Army Light Aviation Training Center, at Viterbo Airport -> Army Light Aviation Center
    - Training Office -> Operations, Training, Information Office
    - Administration Office -> disbanded
    - Command Unit, at Viterbo Airport -> Courses Unit
    - Flight Unit, at Viterbo Airport -> Aircraft Unit
  - new: 1st Army Light Aviation Grouping "Antares", at Viterbo Airport (granted a new flag)
    - Medium Helicopter Battalion, at Viterbo Airport (CH-47C Chinook helicopters) -> 11th Medium Transport Helicopters Squadrons Group "Ercole" and 12th Medium Transport Helicopters Squadrons Group "Gru"
    - I General Use Helicopters Battalion, at Viterbo Airport (AB 204/205 helicopters) -> 51st Multirole Helicopters Squadrons Group "Leone"
  - XXX Light Aviation Battalion, at Padua Airport (AB 204/205 helicopters -> III General Use Helicopters Battalion --> III Army Corps; on 19 February 1976 -> 53rd Multirole Helicopters Squadrons Group "Cassiopea"
  - Light Airplanes Section, at Alghero Airport (SISMI support unit, SM.1019A planes) -> 399th Light Airplanes Squadron ʘ-> Guidonia Airport

=== III Army Corps ===
- III Army Corps, in Milan -> 3rd Army Corps
  - new: 3rd Army Corps Command Unit, in Milan
  - Horse Artillery Regiment, in Milan
    - Command and Services Battery, in Milan
    - I 155/23 Self-propelled Group, in Milan (M44 155 mm self-propelled howitzers)
    - II 155/23 Self-propelled Group, in Milan (M44 155 mm self-propelled howitzers)
    - III 155/23 Self-propelled Group, in Milan (M44 155 mm self-propelled howitzers) -> III 155/45 Cannons Group -> M59 155 mm towed howitzers
    - Horse Battery (Ceremonial unit with horse-drawn 75/27 mod 12 cannons)
  - 52nd Heavy Artillery Regiment, in Brescia -> disbanded
    - Command and Services Battery, in Brescia -> disbanded
    - I 155/45 Cannons Group, in Brescia (M59 155 mm towed howitzers) -> 52nd Field Artillery Group "Venaria" (assigned the flag of the 52nd Artillery Regiment "Torino") -> M114 155 mm towed howitzers --> Mechanized Brigade "Brescia"
    - II 155/45 Cannons Group, in Brescia (M59 155 mm towed howitzers) -> IV 155/45 Cannons Group (Reserve) / Horse Artillery Regiment ʘ-> Cremona
    - III 155/45 Cannons Group (Reserve), in Brescia (M59 155 mm towed howitzers) -> disbanded
    - IV 203/25 Howitzers Group, in Brescia (M115 203 mm towed howitzers) -> V 203/25 Howitzers Group / Horse Artillery Regiment
    - V 203/25 Howitzers Group (Reserve), in Brescia (M115 203 mm towed howitzers) -> disbanded
  - III Artillery Specialists Group, in Milan -> 30th Artillery Specialists Group "Brianza" (Reserve - 1 × company active and assigned to the Horse Artillery Regiment)
  - III Light Aviation Battalion, at Bresso Airport (L-21B Super Cup) -> 23rd Light Airplanes and Helicopters Squadrons Group "Eridano"
  - III Army Corps Engineer Battalion, in Pavia -> 3rd Engineer Battalion "Lario" (assigned the flag of the 10th Engineer Regiment)
  - III Army Corps Signal Battalion, in Milan -> 3rd Signal Battalion "Spluga" (assigned the flag of the 1st Radio-Telegraphers Regiment)
  - III Army Corps Auto Group, in Milan -> 3rd Army Corps Auto Group "Fulvia" (granted a new flag)
  - III Supply, Repairs, Recovery Battalion, in Milan -> 3rd Supply, Repairs, Recovery Battalion
  - 3rd Light Army Aviation Repairs Unit, at Orio al Serio Airport --> Army Logistic Inspectorate

==== Armored Division "Centauro" ====
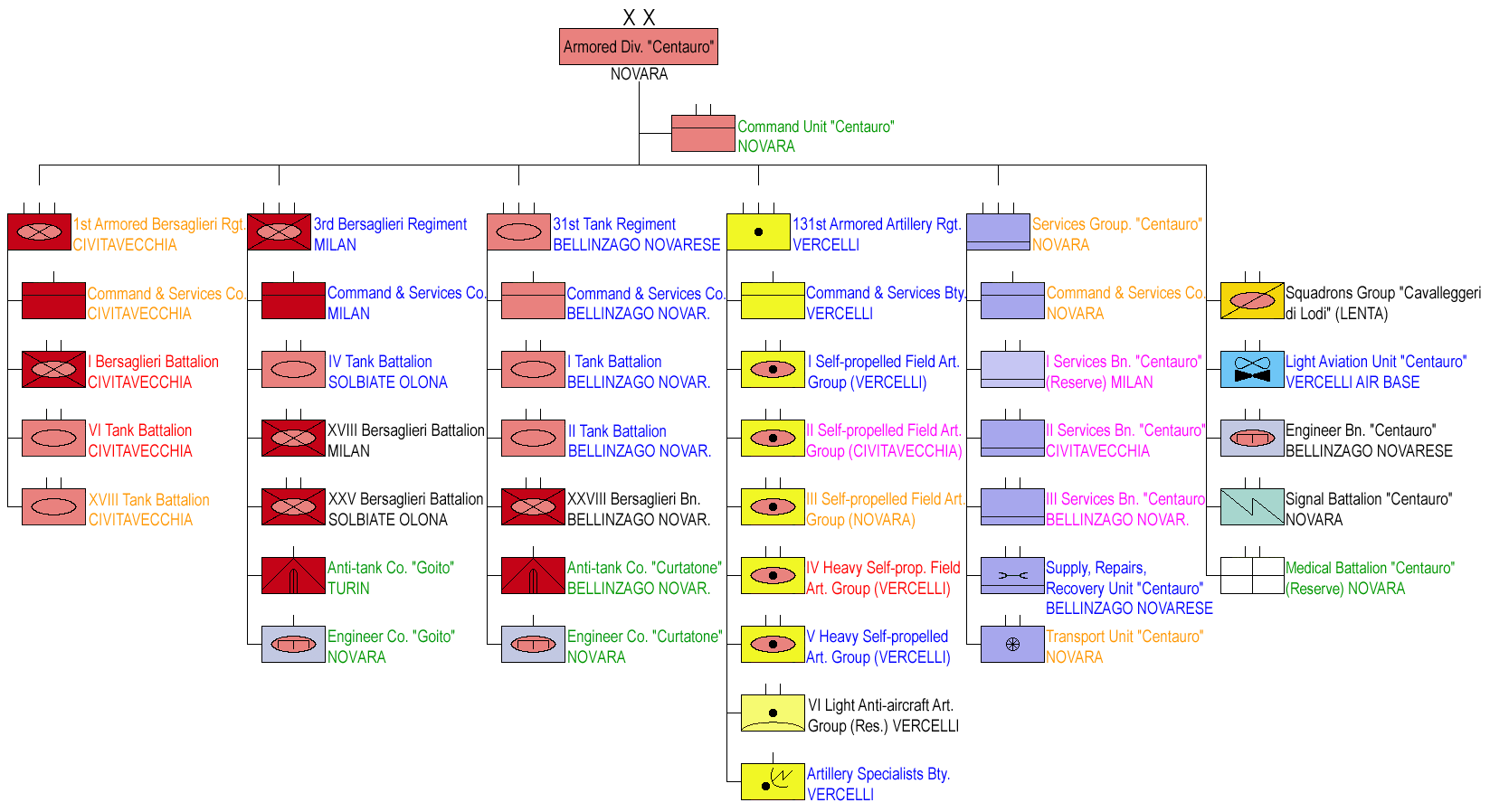
Armored Division "Centauro" 1975 reform changes

- Armored Division "Centauro", in Novara
  - new: Command Unit "Centauro", in Novara
  - 1st Armored Bersaglieri Regiment, in Civitavecchia -> disbanded
    - Command and Services Company, in Civitavecchia (includes an anti-tank guided missile platoon) -> disbanded
    - I Bersaglieri Battalion, in Civitavecchia (M113 APCs) -> 1st Bersaglieri Battalion "La Marmora" (assigned the flag of the 1st Bersaglieri Regiment) --> Mechanized Brigade "Granatieri di Sardegna"
    - VI Tank Battalion, in Civitavecchia (M47 Patton tanks) -> 6th Tank Battalion "M.O. Scapuzzi" (assigned the flag of the 33rd Tank Regiment) --> Mechanized Brigade "Granatieri di Sardegna"
    - XVIII Tank Battalion, in Civitavecchia (M47 Patton tanks) -> disbanded
  - 3rd Bersaglieri Regiment, in Milan -> 3rd Mechanized Brigade "Goito"
    - Command and Services Company, in Milan (includes an anti-tank guided missile platoon) -> Command and Signal Unit "Goito"
    - IV Tank Battalion, in Solbiate Olona (M47 Patton tanks) -> 4th Tank Battalion "M.O. Passalacqua" (granted a new flag) -> Leopard 1A2 main battle tanks
    - XVIII Bersaglieri Battalion, in Milan (M113 APCs) -> 18th Bersaglieri Battalion "Poggio Scanno" (assigned the flag of the 3rd Bersaglieri Regiment)
    - XXV Bersaglieri Battalion, in Solbiate Olona (M113 APCs) -> 10th Bersaglieri Battalion "Bezzecca" (assigned the flag of the 7th Bersaglieri Regiment)
    - new: Anti-tank Company "Goito", in Turin
    - new: Engineer Company "Goito", in Novara
  - 31st Tank Regiment, in Bellinzago Novarese -> 31st Armored Brigade "Curtatone"
    - Command and Services Company, in Bellinzago Novarese (includes an anti-tank guided missile platoon) -> Command and Signal Unit "Curtatone"
    - I Tank Battalion, in Bellinzago Novarese (M47 Patton tanks) -> 1st Tank Battalion "M.O. Cracco" (assigned the flag of the 31st Tank Regiment) -> Leopard 1A2 main battle tanks
    - II Tank Battalion, in Bellinzago Novarese (M47 Patton tanks) -> 101st Tank Battalion "M.O. Zappala" (assigned the flag of the 131st Tank Regiment) -> Leopard 1A2 main battle tanks
    - XXVIII Bersaglieri Battalion, in Bellinzago Novarese (M113 APCs) -> 28th Bersaglieri Battalion "Oslavia" (assigned the flag of the 9th Bersaglieri Regiment)
    - new: Anti-tank Company "Curtatone", in Bellinzago Novarese
    - new: Engineer Company "Curtatone", in Novara
  - 131st Armored Artillery Regiment, in Vercelli -> Divisional Artillery Command
    - Command and Services Battery, in Vercelli -> Artillery Specialists Group "Centauro"
    - I Self-propelled Field Artillery Group, in Vercelli (M109G 155 mm self-propelled howitzers) -> 131st Heavy Field Artillery Group "Vercelli" (assigned the flag of the 131st Artillery Regiment "Centauro") -> M114 155 mm towed howitzers
    - II Self-propelled Field Artillery Group, in Civitavecchia (M109G 155 mm self-propelled howitzers) -> 13th Field Artillery Group "Magliana" (assigned the flag of the 13th Artillery Regiment "Granatieri di Sardegna") -> M114 155 mm towed howitzers --> Mechanized Brigade "Granatieri di Sardegna"
    - III Self-propelled Field Artillery Group, in Novara (M109G 155 mm self-propelled howitzers) -> disbanded
    - IV Heavy Self-propelled Field Artillery Group, in Vercelli (M44 155 mm self-propelled howitzers) -> 9th Self-propelled Field Artillery Group "Brennero" (assigned the flag of the 9th Artillery Regiment "Brennero") --> 31st Armored Brigade "Curtatone"
    - V Heavy Self-propelled Artillery Group, in Vercelli (M55 203 mm self-propelled howitzers) -> 205th Heavy Field Artillery Group "Lomellina" (assigned the flag of the 205th Artillery Regiment "Bologna") -> M114 155 mm towed howitzers
    - VI Light Anti-aircraft Artillery Group (Reserve), in Vercelli (Bofors 40 mm anti-aircraft guns and 12.7mm anti-aircraft machine guns) -> 11th Light Anti-aircraft Artillery Group "Falco" (Reserve)
    - Artillery Specialists Battery, in Vercelli -> Artillery Specialists Group "Centauro"
  - Squadrons Group "Cavalleggeri di Lodi", in Lenta (Fiat Campagnola reconnaissance vehicles and M47 Patton tanks) -> 15th Squadrons Group "Cavalleggeri di Lodi" (assigned the flag of the Regiment "Cavalleggeri di Lodi" (15th))
  - Light Aviation Unit "Centauro", at Vercelli Airport (L-19E Bird Dog light aircraft and AB 206 reconnaissance helicopters) -> 46th Reconnaissance Helicopters Squadrons Group "Sagittario"
  - Engineer Battalion "Centauro", in Bellinzago Novarese -> 131st Engineer Battalion "Ticino" (assigned the flag of the 9th Engineer Regiment)
  - Signal Battalion "Centauro", in Novara -> 231st Signal Battalion "Sempione" (granted a new flag)
  - Services Grouping "Centauro", in Novara -> disbanded
    - Command and Services Company, in Novara -> disbanded
    - Supply, Repairs, Recovery Unit "Centauro", in Bellinzago Novarese -> Logistic Battalion "Centauro" (granted a new flag)
    - Auto Unit "Centauro", in Novara -> disbanded
    - I Services Battalion "Centauro" (Reserve), in Milan -> Logistic Battalion "Goito" (granted a new flag) ʘ-> Monza --> 3rd Mechanized Brigade "Goito"
    - II Services Battalion "Centauro", in Civitavecchia -> Logistic Battalion "Granatieri di Sardegna" (granted a new flag) --> Mechanized Brigade "Granatieri di Sardegna"
    - III Services Battalion "Centauro", in Bellinzago Novarese -> Logistic Battalion "Curtatone" (granted a new flag) --> 31st Armored Brigade "Curtatone"
  - new: Medical Battalion "Centauro" (Reserve), in Novara

==== Infantry Division "Legnano" ====
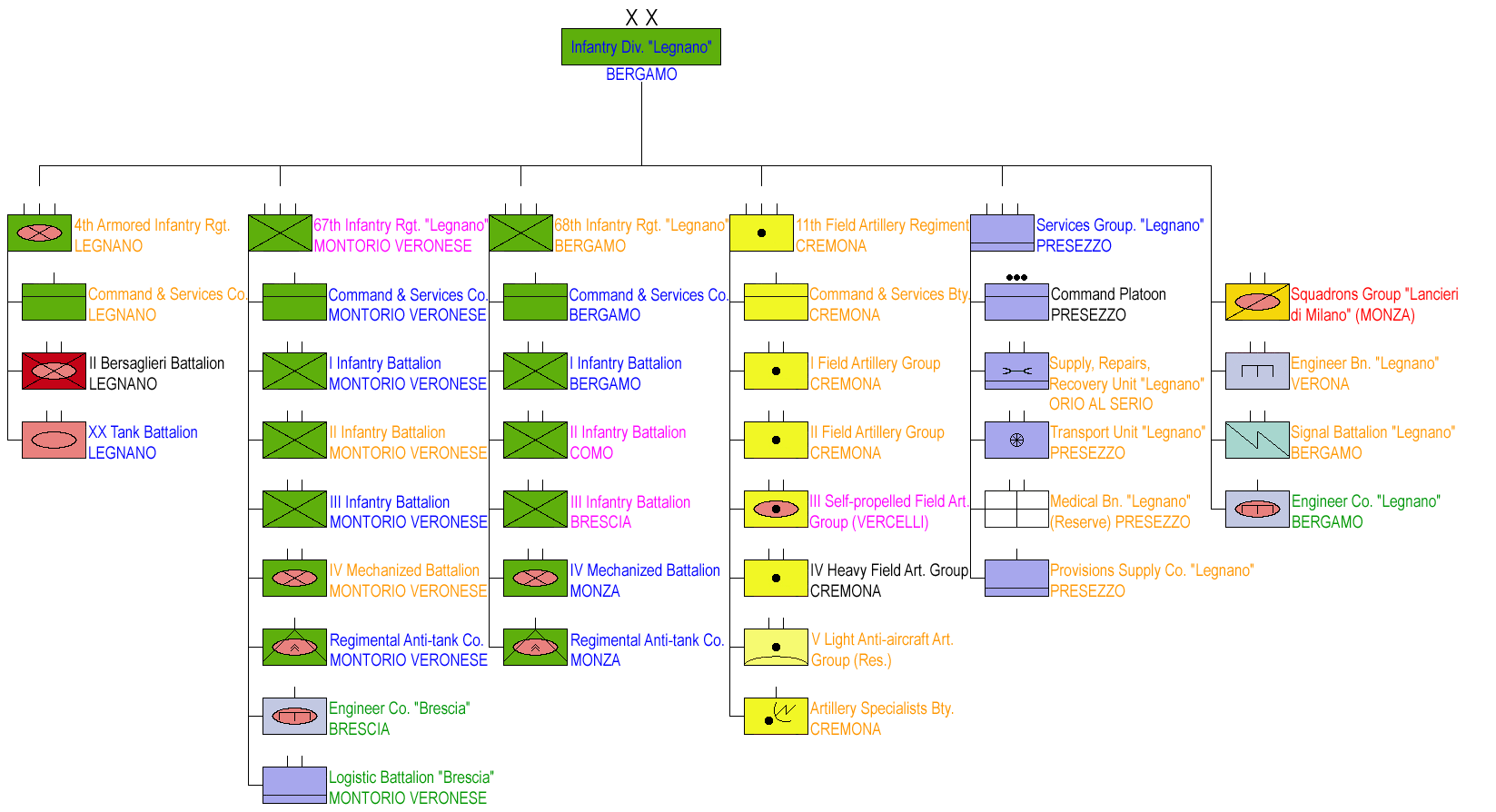
Infantry Division "Legnano" 1975 reform changes

- Infantry Division "Legnano", in Bergamo -> Mechanized Brigade "Legnano" --> Armored Division "Centauro"
  - 4th Armored Infantry Regiment, in Legnano -> disbanded
    - Command and Services Company, in Legnano (includes an anti-tank guided missile platoon) -> disbanded
    - II Bersaglieri Battalion, in Legnano (M113 APCs) -> 2nd Bersaglieri Battalion "Governolo" (assigned the flag of the 2nd Bersaglieri Regiment)
    - XX Tank Battalion, in Legnano (M47 Patton tanks) -> 20th Tank Battalion "M.O. Pentimalli" (assigned the flag of the 4th Armored Infantry Regiment) -> Leopard 1A2 main battle tanks
  - 67th Infantry Regiment "Legnano", in Montorio Veronese -> Mechanized Brigade "Brescia" ʘ-> Brescia --> Mechanized Division "Mantova"
    - Command and Services Company, in Montorio Veronese -> Command and Signal Unit "Brescia" ʘ-> Brescia
    - I Infantry Battalion, in Montorio Veronese -> 85th Mechanized Infantry Battalion "Verona" (assigned the flag of the 85th Infantry Regiment "Verona")
    - II Infantry Battalion, in Montorio Veronese -> disbanded
    - III Infantry Battalion, in Montorio Veronese -> 30th Mechanized Infantry Battalion "Pisa" (assigned the flag of the 30th Infantry Regiment "Pisa")
    - IV Mechanized Battalion, in Montorio Veronese (M113 armored personnel carriers and M47 tanks) -> disbanded
    - Regimental Anti-tank Company, in Montorio Veronese (anti-tank guided missiles and M47 tanks) -> Anti-tank Company "Brescia"
    - new: Logistic Battalion "Brescia", in Montorio Veronese (granted a new flag)
  - 68th Infantry Regiment "Legnano", in Bergamo -> disbanded
    - Command and Services Company, in Bergamo -> Command and Signal Unit "Legnano"
    - I Infantry Battalion, in Bergamo -> 68th Mechanized Infantry Battalion "Palermo" (assigned the flag of the 68th Infantry Regiment "Legnano")
    - II Infantry Battalion, in Como -> 23rd Infantry Battalion "Como" (Recruits Training) (assigned the flag of the 23rd Infantry Regiment "Como") --> Regione Militare Nord Ovest
    - III Infantry Battalion, in Brescia -> 20th Mechanized Infantry Battalion "Monte San Michele" (assigned the flag of the 20th Infantry Regiment "Brescia") --> Mechanized Brigade "Brescia"
    - IV Mechanized Battalion, in Monza (M113 armored personnel carriers and M47 tanks) -> 67th Mechanized Infantry Battalion "Montelungo" (assigned the flag of the 67th Infantry Regiment "Legnano")
    - Regimental Anti-tank Company, in Monza (anti-tank guided missiles and M47 tanks) -> Anti-tank Company "Legnano"
  - 11th Field Artillery Regiment, in Cremona -> disbanded
    - Command and Services Battery, in Cremona -> disbanded
    - I Field Artillery Group, in Cremona (M101 105 mm towed howitzers) -> disbanded
    - II Field Artillery Group, in Cremona (M101 105 mm towed howitzers) -> disbanded
    - III Self-propelled Field Artillery Group, in Vercelli (M7 105 mm self-propelled howitzers) -> 3rd Field Artillery Group "Pastrengo" (assigned the flag of the 3rd Artillery Regiment "Pistoia") -> M114 155 mm towed howitzers --> 3rd Mechanized Brigade "Goito"
    - IV Heavy Field Artillery Group, in Cremona (M114 155 mm towed howitzers) -> 11th Field Artillery Group "Monferrato" (assigned the flag of the 11th Field Artillery Regiment)
    - V Light Anti-aircraft Artillery Group (Reserve), in (?) (Bofors 40 mm anti-aircraft guns and 12.7mm anti-aircraft machine guns) -> disbanded
    - Artillery Specialists Battery, in Cremona -> disbanded
  - Squadrons Group "Lancieri di Milano", in Monza (Fiat Campagnola reconnaissance vehicles and M47 Patton tanks) -> 7th Squadrons Group "Lancieri di Milano" (assigned the flag of the Regiment "Lancieri di Milano" (7th)) ʘ-> Remanzacco --> Mechanized Division "Mantova"
  - Engineer Battalion "Legnano", in Verona -> split into Engineer Company "Legnano" and Engineer Company "Brescia" ʘ-> Bergamo respectively ʘ-> Brescia
  - Signal Battalion "Legnano", in Bergamo -> disbanded
  - Services Grouping "Legnano", in Presezzo -> Logistic Battalion "Legnano" (granted a new flag)
    - Command Platoono, in Presezzo
    - Supply, Repairs, Recovery Unit "Legnano", in Orio al Serio -> disbanded
    - Auto Unit "Legnano", in Presezzo -> disbanded
    - Medical Battalion "Legnano" (Reserve), in Presezzo (includes the 5th Field Hospital) -> disbanded
    - Provisions Supply Company "Legnano", in Presezzo -> disbanded

==== Infantry Division "Cremona" ====
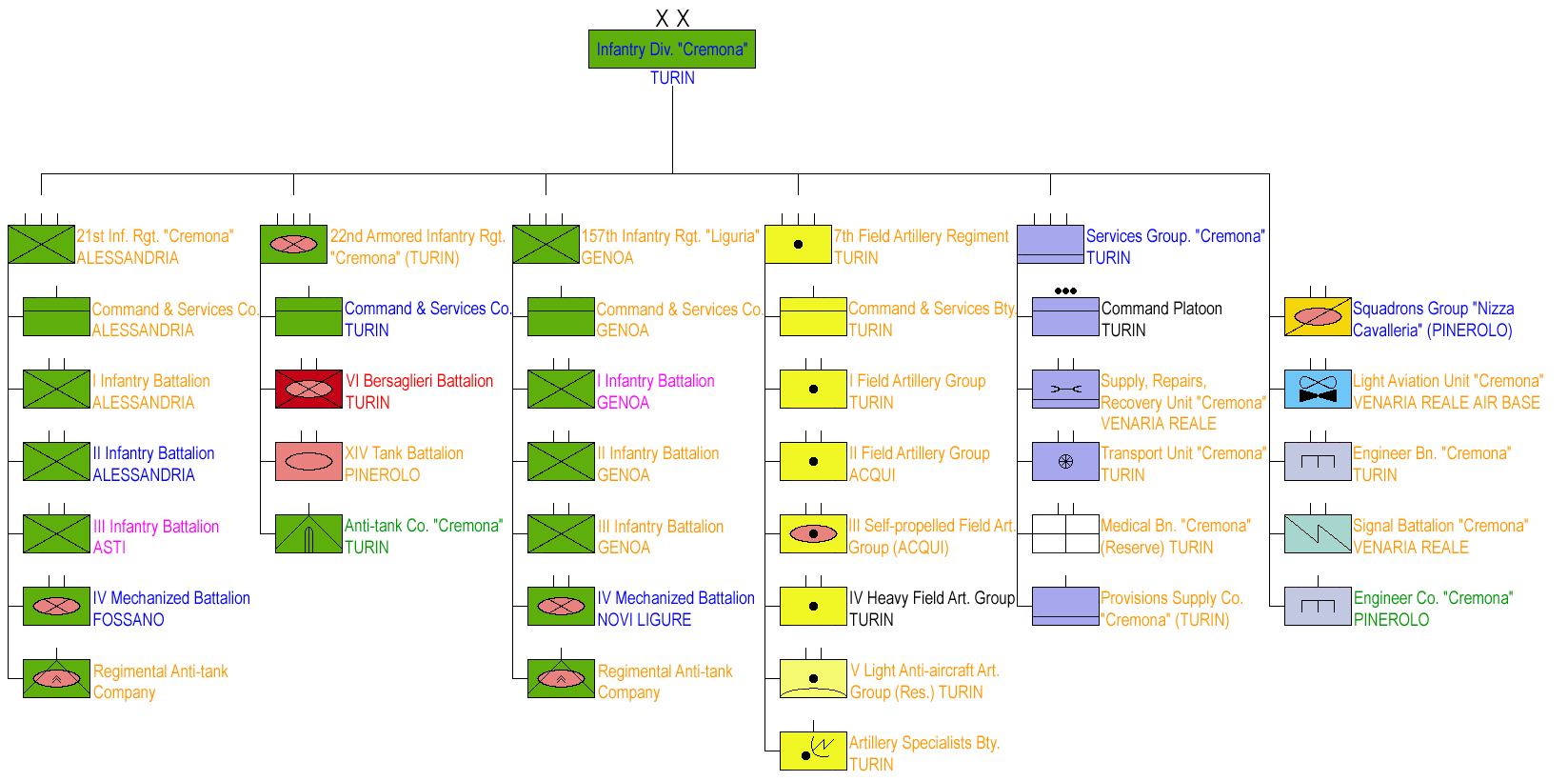
Infantry Division "Cremona" 1975 reform changes

- Infantry Division "Cremona", in Turin -> Motorized Brigade "Cremona"
  - 21st Infantry Regiment "Cremona", in Asti -> disbanded
    - Command and Services Company, in Asti -> disbanded
    - I Infantry Battalion, in Alessandria -> disbanded and equipment stored (In case of war would have been activated as 50th Motorized Infantry Battalion "Parma" and would have been assigned the flag of the 50th Infantry Regiment "Parma")
    - II Infantry Battalion, in Alessandria -> 21st Motorized Infantry Battalion "Alfonsine" (assigned the flag of the 21st Infantry Regiment "Cremona")
    - III Infantry Battalion, in Asti -> Detachment 23rd Infantry Battalion "Como" (Recruits Training); in 1977 -> 4th Infantry Battalion "Guastalla" (Recruits Training) (assigned the flag of the 4th Infantry Regiment "Piemonte") --> 3rd Army Corps
    - IV Mechanized Battalion, in Fossano (M113 armored personnel carriers and M47 tanks) -> 22nd Infantry Battalion "Primaro" (Recruits Training) (assigned the flag of the 22nd Infantry Regiment "Cremona")
    - Regimental Anti-tank Company, in Asti (anti-tank guided missiles and M47 tanks) -> disbanded
  - 22nd Armored Infantry Regiment "Cremona", in Turin -> disbanded
    - Command and Services Company, in Turin (includes an anti-tank guided missile platoon) -> Command and Signal Unit "Cremona"
    - VI Bersaglieri Battalion, in Turin (M113 armored personnel carriers) -> 6th Bersaglieri Battalion "Palestro" (assigned the flag of the 6th Bersaglieri Regiment) --> 3rd Mechanized Brigade "Goito"
    - XIV Tank Battalion, in Pinerolo (M47 Patton tanks) -> disbanded
  - 157th Infantry Regiment "Liguria", in Genoa -> disbanded
    - Command and Services Company, in Genoa -> disbanded
    - I Infantry Battalion, in Genoa -> 26th Infantry Battalion "Bergamo" (Recruits Training) (assigned the flag of the 26th Infantry Regiment "Bergamo") ʘ-> Diano Castello --> Armored Division "Centauro"
    - II Infantry Battalion, in Genoa -> disbanded
    - III Infantry Battalion, in Genoa -> disbanded
    - IV Mechanized Battalion, in Novi Ligure (M113 armored personnel carriers and M47 tanks) -> 157th Motorized Infantry Battalion "Liguria" (assigned the flag of the 157th Infantry Regiment "Liguria")
    - Regimental Anti-tank Company, in (?) (anti-tank guided missiles and M47 tanks) -> disbanded
  - 7th Field Artillery Regiment, in Turin -> disbanded
    - Command and Services Battery, in Turin -> disbanded
    - I Field Artillery Group, in Turin (M101 105 mm towed howitzers) -> disbanded
    - II Field Artillery Group, in Acqui (M101 105 mm towed howitzers) -> disbanded
    - III Self-propelled Field Artillery Group, in Acqui (M7 105 mm self-propelled howitzers) -> disbanded
    - IV Heavy Field Artillery Group, in Turin (M114 155 mm towed howitzers) -> 7th Field Artillery Group "Adria" (assigned the flag of the 7th Artillery Regiment "Cremona")
    - V Light Anti-aircraft Artillery Group (Reserve), in (?) (Bofors 40 mm anti-aircraft guns and 12.7mm anti-aircraft machine guns) -> disbanded
    - Artillery Specialists Battery, in Turin -> disbanded
  - Squadrons Group "Nizza Cavalleria", in Pinerolo (Fiat Campagnola reconnaissance vehicles and M47 Patton tanks) -> 1st Armored Squadrons Group "Nizza Cavalleria" (assigned the flag of the Regiment "Nizza Cavalleria" (1st))
  - Light Aviation Unit "Cremona", at Venaria Reale Airport (L-19E Bird Dog light aircraft and AB 206 reconnaissance helicopters) -> disbanded
  - Engineer Battalion "Cremona", in Turin -> disbanded
  - Signal Battalion "Cremona", in Venaria Reale -> disbanded
  - new: Engineer Company "Cremona", in Pinerolo
  - new: Anti-tank Company "Cremona", in Turin
  - Services Grouping "Cremona", in Turin -> Logistic Battalion "Cremona" (granted a new flag)
    - Command Platoon, in Turin
    - Supply, Repairs, Recovery Unit "Cremona", in Venaria Reale -> disbanded
    - Auto Unit "Cremona", in Turin -> disbanded
    - Medical Battalion "Cremona" (Reserve), in Turin -> disbanded
    - Provisions Supply Company "Cremona", in Turin -> disbanded

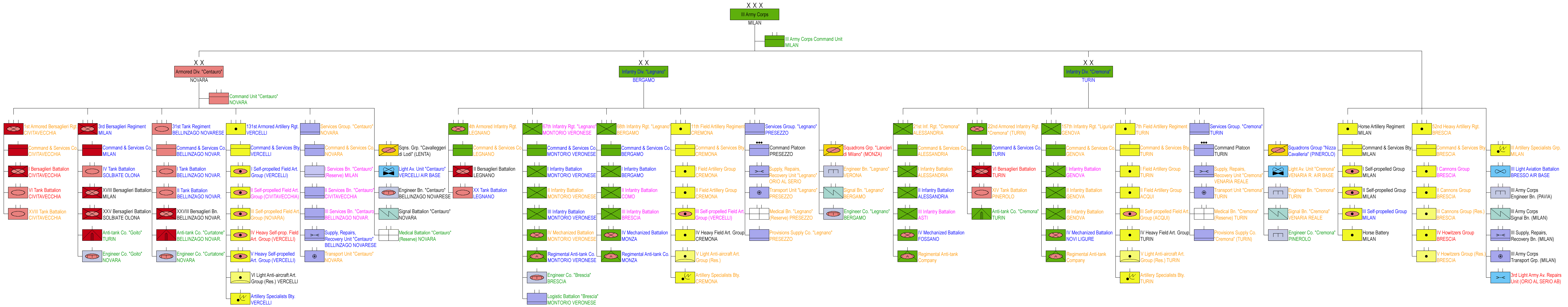
III Army Corps 1975 reform changes

=== IV Alpine Army Corps ===
- IV Alpine Army Corps, in Bolzano -> 4th Alpine Army Corps
  - new: 4th Alpine Army Corps Command Unit, in Bolzano
  - 2nd Alpini Regiment (CAR), in Cuneo -> disbanded
    - Command and Services Company, in Cuneo -> disbanded
    - Alpini Battalion "Orobica", in Cuneo -> Alpini Battalion "Mondovì" (Recruits Training) (assigned the flag of the 1st Alpini Regiment) --> Alpine Brigade "Taurinense"
    - Alpini Battalion "Tridentina", in Cuneo -> disbanded
    - Alpini Battalion "Taurinense", in Bra -> disbanded
  - 2nd Engineer Regiment, in Bolzano -> disbanded
    - Command and Services Company, in Bolzano -> disbanded
    - II Mining Engineer Battalion, in Bolzano -> 2nd Mining Engineer Battalion "Iseo" (assigned the flag of the 2nd Engineer Regiment)
    - IV Engineer Battalion, in Bolzano -> disbanded
    - VII Engineer Battalion, in Riva del Garda -> disbanded
    - XIV Army Corps Engineer Battalion, in Trento -> 4th Engineer Battalion "Orta" (assigned the flag of the 4th Engineer Regiment)
    - 1st Cable Car Company, in Trento -> disbanded
    - Mixed Photoelectric-Camouflage Company, in Trento -> disbanded
  - Regiment "Savoia Cavalleria" (3rd), in Meran -> disbanded
    - Command and Services Squadron, in Meran -> disbanded
    - I Squadrons Group, in Meran (M47 Patton tanks and M113 armored personnel carriers) -> 3rd Armored Squadrons Group "Savoia Cavalleria" (assigned the flag of the Regiment "Savoia Cavalleria" (3rd))
    - II Squadrons Group, in Meran (M47 Patton tanks and M113 armored personnel carriers) -> disbanded
    - III Squadrons Group, in Meran (M47 Patton tanks and M113 armored personnel carriers) -> disbanded
  - 4th Heavy Field Artillery Regiment, in Trento (flag of the 4th Army Corps Artillery Regiment)
    - Command and Services Battery, in Trento
    - I 155/23 Howitzers Group, in Trento (M114 155 mm towed howitzers)
    - II 155/23 Howitzers Group, in Trento (M114 155 mm towed howitzers)
    - III 155/23 Howitzers Group (Reserve), in Trento (M114 155 mm towed howitzers) -> disbanded
    - IV 155/45 Cannons Group, in Trento (M59 155 mm towed howitzers) (former II 155/45 Cannons Group / 9th Heavy Artillery Regiment, transferred in 1973) -> (Reserve)
    - V 155/45 Cannons Group, in Trento (M59 155 mm towed howitzers) (former III 155/45 Cannons Group / 9th Heavy Artillery Regiment, transferred in 1973)
  - III Self-propelled Field Artillery Group, in Trento (M7 105 mm self-propelled howitzers) -> 10th Self-propelled Field Artillery Group "Avisio" (assigned the flag of the 10th Army Corps Artillery Regiment) -> M44 155 mm self-propelled howitzers
  - IV Artillery Specialists Group, in Trento -> 4th Artillery Specialists Group "Bondone" (assigned the flag of the 3rd Army Corps Artillery Regiment)
  - new: 4th Army Light Aviation Grouping "Altair", at Bolzano Airport (granted a new flag)
  - IV Light Aviation Battalion, at Bolzano Airport (L-21B Super Cup) -> 24th Light Airplanes and Helicopters Squadrons Group "Orione" --> 4th Army Light Aviation Grouping "Altair"
  - IV General Use Helicopters Battalion, at Bolzano Airport(AB 204/205 helicopters) -> 54th Multirole Helicopters Squadrons Group "Cefeo" --> 4th Army Light Aviation Grouping "Altair"
  - IV Army Corps Signal Battalion, in Bolzano -> 4th Signal Battalion "Gardena" (assigned the flag of the 2nd Radio-Telegraphers Regiment)
  - IV Army Corps Auto Group, in Eppan -> 4th Army Corps Auto Group "Claudia" (granted a new flag)
  - IV Supply, Repairs, Recovery Battalion, in Bolzano
  - VII Mechanized Carabinieri Battalion "Trentino-Alto Adige", in Laives (M47 Patton tanks and M113 APCs) -> 7th Carabinieri Battalion "M. O. Petruccelli" (granted a new flag)
  - Alpini Paratroopers Company, in Bolzano

==== Alpine Brigade "Taurinense" ====
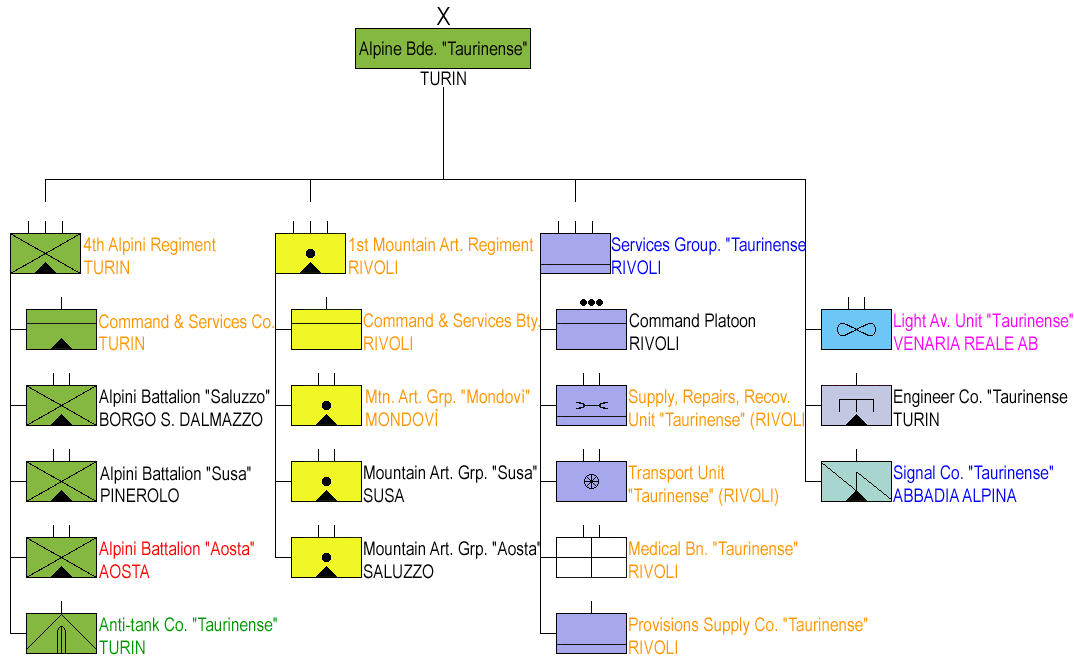
Alpine Brigade "Taurinense" 1975 reform changes

- Alpine Brigade "Taurinense", in Turin
  - 4th Alpini Regiment, in Turin -> disbanded
    - Command and Services Company, in Turin -> disbanded
    - Alpini Battalion "Saluzzo", in Borgo San Dalmazzo -> Alpini Battalion "Saluzzo" (assigned the flag of the 2nd Alpini Regiment)
    - Alpini Battalion "Susa", in Pinerolo -> Alpini Battalion "Susa" (assigned the flag of the 3rd Alpini Regiment)
    - Alpini Battalion "Aosta", in Aosta -> Alpini Battalion "Aosta" (assigned the flag of the 4th Alpini Regiment) --> Military Alpine School
  - 1st Mountain Artillery Regiment, in Rivoli -> disbanded
    - Command and Services Battery, in Rivoli -> disbanded
    - Mountain Artillery Group "Mondovì", in Mondovì (M56 105 mm pack howitzers) -> disbanded
    - Mountain Artillery Group "Susa", in Susa (M56 105 mm pack howitzers) -> Mountain Artillery Group "Pinerolo" (assigned the flag of the 4th Mountain Artillery Regiment)
    - Mountain Artillery Group "Aosta", in Saluzzo (M56 105 mm pack howitzers) -> Mountain Artillery Group "Aosta" (assigned the flag of the 1st Mountain Artillery Regiment)
  - Light Aviation Unit "Taurinense", at Venaria Reale Airport (L-19E Bird Dog) -> 442nd Reconnaissance Helicopters Squadron / 44th Reconnaissance Helicopters Squadrons Group "Fenice" / 4th Army Light Aviation Grouping "Altair"
  - new: Alpini Anti-tank Company "Taurinense", in Turin
  - Alpini Engineer Company "Taurinense", in Turin
  - Alpini Signal Company "Taurinense", in Abbadia Alpina -> Alpini Command and Signal Unit "Taurinense"
  - Services Grouping "Taurinense", in Rivoli -> Logistic Battalion "Taurinense" (granted a new flag)
    - Command Platoon, in Rivoli
    - Supply, Repairs, Recovery Unit "Taurinense", in Rivoli -> disbanded
    - Medical Battalion "Taurinense", in Rivoli -> disbanded
    - Auto Unit "Taurinense", in Rivoli -> disbanded
    - Provisions Supply Company "Taurinense", in Rivoli -> disbanded

==== Alpine Brigade "Orobica" ====
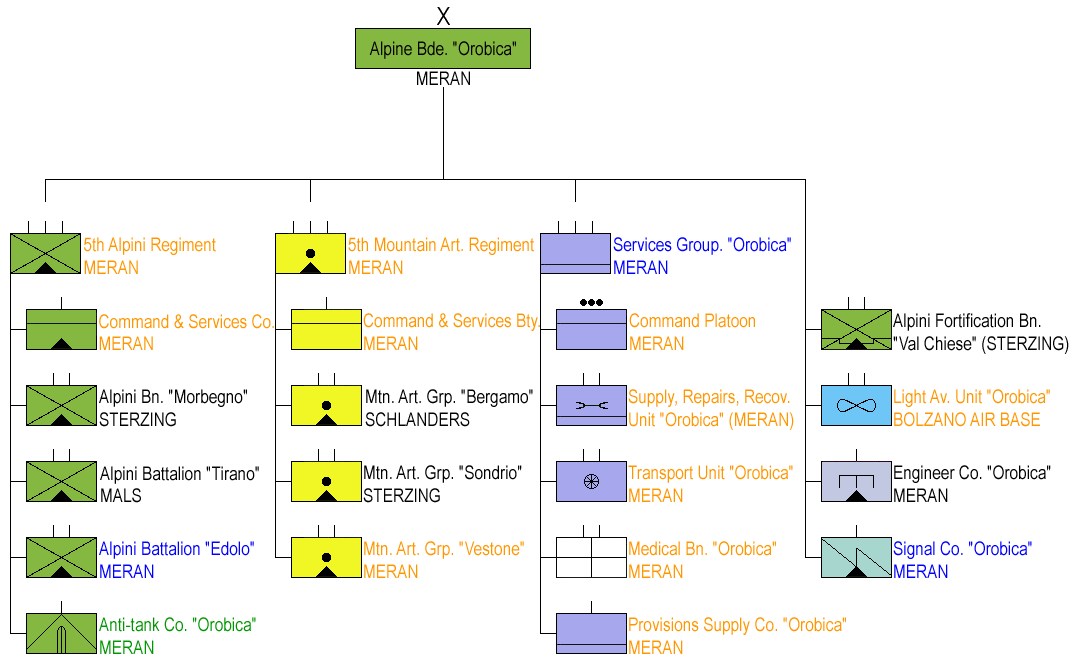
Alpine Brigade "Orobica" 1975 reform changes

- Alpine Brigade "Orobica", in Meran
  - 5th Alpini Regiment, in Meran -> disbanded
    - Command and Services Company, in Meran -> disbanded
    - Alpini Battalion "Morbegno", in Sterzing -> Alpini Battalion "Morbegno" (assigned the flag of the 5th Alpini Regiment)
    - Alpini Battalion "Tirano", in Mals and Glurns -> Alpini Battalion "Tirano" (granted a new flag)
    - Alpini Battalion "Edolo", in Meran -> Alpini Battalion "Edolo" (Recruits Training) (granted a new flag)
  - 5th Mountain Artillery Regiment, in Meran -> disbanded
    - Command and Services Battery, in Meran -> disbanded
    - Mountain Artillery Group "Bergamo", in Schlanders (M56 105 mm pack howitzers) -> Mountain Artillery Group "Bergamo" (assigned the flag of the 5th Mountain Artillery Regiment)
    - Mountain Artillery Group "Sondrio", in Sterzing (M56 105mm pack howitzers) -> Mountain Artillery Group "Sondrio" (granted a new flag)
    - Mountain Artillery Group "Vestone", in Meran (M56 105mm pack howitzers) -> disbanded
  - Alpini Fortification Battalion "Val Chiese", in Sterzing and Glurns -> Alpini Fortification Battalion "Val Chiese" (assigned the flag of the 22nd Alpini Fortification Grouping)
  - Light Aviation Unit "Orobica", at Bolzano Airport (L-19E Bird Dog) -> disbanded
  - new: Alpini Anti-tank Company "Orobica", in Meran
  - Alpini Engineer Company "Orobica", in Meran
  - Alpini Signal Company "Orobica", in Meran -> Alpini Command and Signal Unit "Orobica"
  - Services Grouping "Orobica", in Meran -> Logistic Battalion "Orobica" (granted a new flag)
    - Command Platoon, in Meran
    - Supply, Repairs, Recovery Unit "Orobica", in Meran -> disbanded
    - Medical Battalion "Orobica", in Meran -> disbanded
    - Auto Unit "Orobica", in Meran -> disbanded
    - Provisions Supply Company "Orobica", in Meran -> disbanded

==== Alpine Brigade "Tridentina" ====
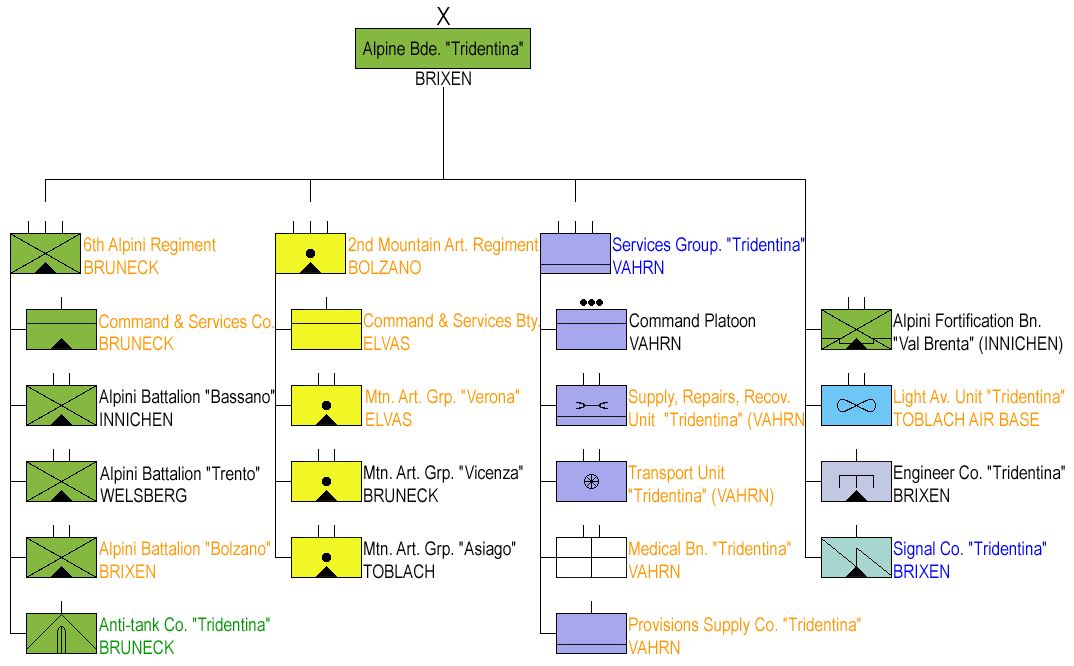
Alpine Brigade "Tridentina" 1975 reform changes

- Alpine Brigade "Tridentina", in Brixen
  - 6th Alpini Regiment, in Bruneck -> disbanded
    - Command and Services Company, in Bruneck -> disbanded
    - Alpini Battalion "Bassano", in Innichen -> Alpini Battalion "Bassano" (assigned the flag of the 6th Alpini Regiment)
    - Alpini Battalion "Trento", in Welsberg -> Alpini Battalion "Trento" (assigned the flag of the 11th Alpini Regiment)
    - Alpini Battalion "Bolzano", in Brixen -> disbanded and equipment stored (In case of war would have been activated as Alpini Battalion "Bolzano" and would have been granted a new flag)
  - 2nd Mountain Artillery Regiment, in Bolzano -> disbanded
    - Command and Services Battery, in Elvas -> disbanded
    - Mountain Artillery Group "Verona", in Elvas (M56 105 mm pack howitzers) -> disbanded
    - Mountain Artillery Group "Vicenza", in Bruneck (M56 105mm pack howitzers) -> Mountain Artillery Group "Vicenza" (assigned the flag of the 2nd Mountain Artillery Regiment)
    - Mountain Artillery Group "Asiago", in Toblach (M56 105 mm pack howitzers) -> Mountain Artillery Group "Asiago" (granted a new flag)
  - Alpini Fortification Battalion "Val Brenta", in Innichen -> Alpini Fortification Battalion "Val Brenta" ʘ-> Bruneck (assigned the flag of the 21st Alpini Fortification Grouping)
  - Light Aviation Unit "Tridentina", at Toblach Airport (L-19E Bird Dog) -> disbanded
  - new: Alpini Anti-tank Company "Tridentina", in Bruneck
  - Alpini Engineer Company "Tridentina", in Brixen
  - Alpini Signal Company "Tridentina", in Brixen -> Alpini Command and Signal Unit "Tridentina"
  - Services Grouping "Tridentina", in Vahrn -> Logistic Battalion "Tridentina" (granted a new flag)
    - Command Platoon, in Vahrn
    - Supply, Repairs, Recovery Unit "Tridentina", in Vahrn -> disbanded
    - Medical Battalion "Tridentina", in Vahrn -> disbanded
    - Auto Unit "Tridentina", in Vahrn -> disbanded
    - Provisions Supply Company "Tridentina", in Vahrn -> disbanded

==== Carnia-Cadore Troops Command ====
- Carnia-Cadore Troops Command, in San Daniele del Friuli -> disbanded
  - VII Army Corps Signal Battalion, in Bassano -> 7th Signal Company --> 4th Signal Battalion "Gardena"
  - VII Light Aviation Battalion, at Campoformido Airport -> disbanded

===== Alpine Brigade "Cadore" =====
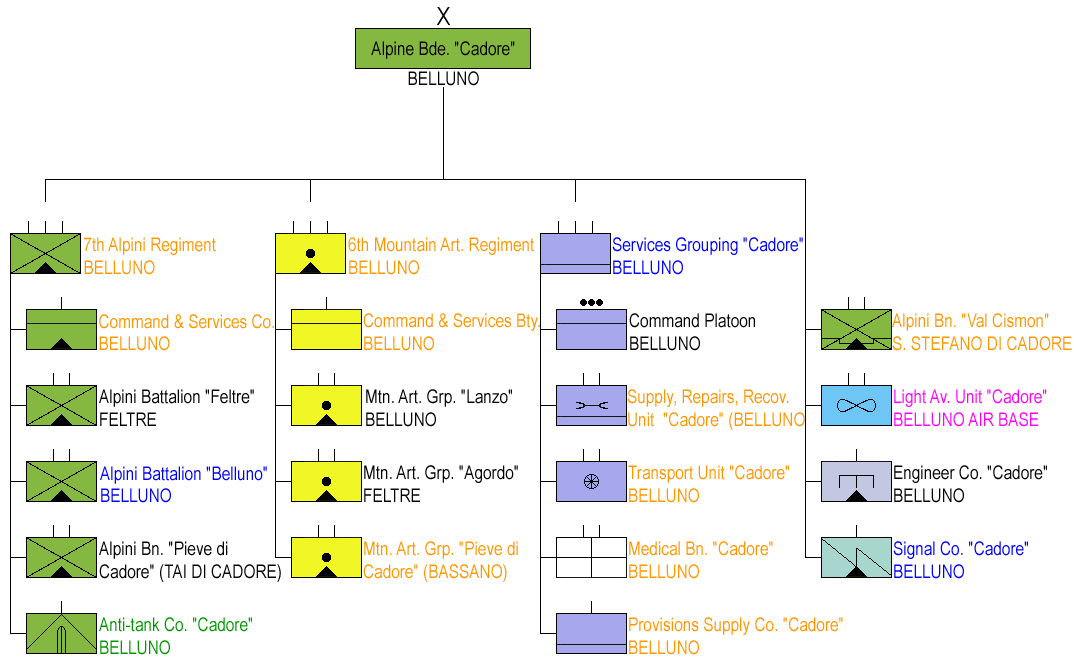
Alpine Brigade "Cadore" 1975 reform changes

- Alpine Brigade "Cadore", in Belluno
  - 7th Alpini Regiment, in Belluno -> disbanded
    - Command and Services Company, in Belluno -> disbanded
    - Alpini Battalion "Feltre", in Feltre and Strigno -> Alpini Battalion "Feltre" (assigned the flag of the 7th Alpini Regiment)
    - Alpini Battalion "Belluno", in Belluno and Agordo -> Alpini Battalion "Belluno" (Recruits Training) (granted a new flag)
    - Alpini Battalion "Pieve di Cadore", in Tai di Cadore -> Alpini Battalion "Pieve di Cadore" (granted a new flag)
  - 6th Mountain Artillery Regiment, in Belluno -> disbanded
    - Command and Services Battery, in Belluno -> disbanded
    - Mountain Artillery Group "Lanzo", in Belluno (M56 105 mm pack howitzers) -> Mountain Artillery Group "Lanzo" (assigned the flag of the 6th Mountain Artillery Regiment)
    - Mountain Artillery Group "Agordo", in Feltre (M56 105mm pack howitzers) -> disbanded, name and traditions transferred to the Mountain Artillery Group "Pieve di Cadore"
    - Mountain Artillery Group "Pieve di Cadore", in Bassano (M56 105 mm pack howitzers) -> Mountain Artillery Group "Agordo" (granted a new flag)
  - Alpini Battalion "Val Cismon", in Santo Stefano di Cadore -> disbanded; 264th Company and three reserve companies --> Alpini Fortification Battalion "Val Brenta"
  - Light Aviation Unit "Cadore", at Belluno Airport (L-19E Bird Dog) -> 44th Reconnaissance Helicopters Squadrons Group "Fenice" --> 4th Army Light Aviation Grouping "Altair"
  - new: Alpini Anti-tank Company "Cadore", in Belluno
  - Alpini Engineer Company "Cadore", in Belluno
  - Alpini Signal Company "Cadore", in Belluno -> Alpini Command and Signal Unit "Cadore"
  - Services Grouping "Cadore", in Belluno -> Logistic Battalion "Cadore" (granted a new flag)
    - Command Platoon, in Belluno
    - Supply, Repairs, Recovery Unit "Cadore", in Belluno -> disbanded
    - Medical Battalion "Cadore", in Belluno -> disbanded
    - Auto Unit "Cadore", in Belluno -> disbanded
    - Provisions Supply Company "Cadore", in Belluno -> disbanded

===== Alpine Brigade "Julia" =====
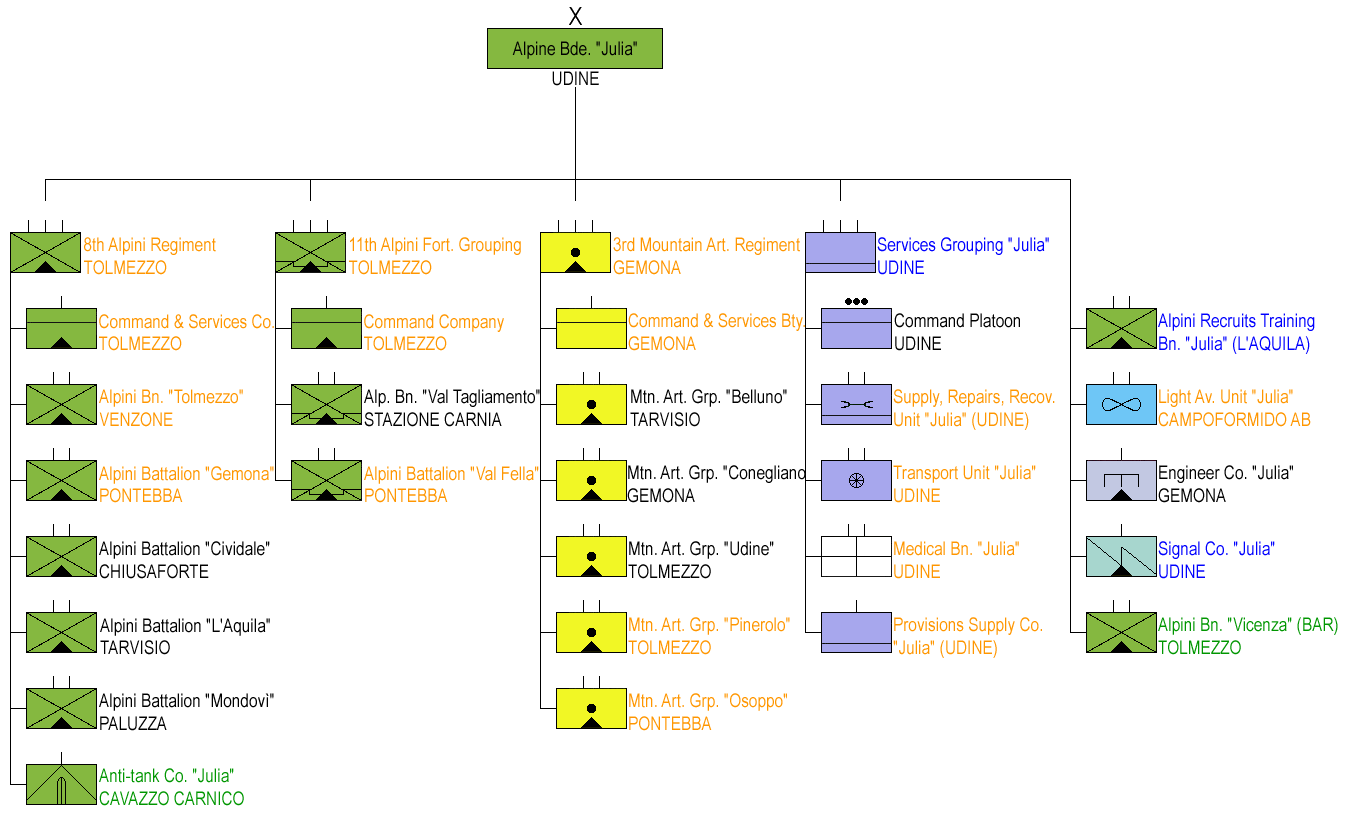
Alpine Brigade "Julia" 1975 reform changes

- Alpine Brigade "Julia", in Udine
  - 8th Alpini Regiment, in Tolmezzo -> disbanded
    - Command and Services Company, in Tolmezzo -> disbanded
    - Alpini Battalion "Tolmezzo", in Venzone and Moggio Udinese -> disbanded, name and traditions transferred to the Alpini Battalion "Mondovì"
    - Alpini Battalion "Gemona", in Pontebba and Ugovizza -> disbanded, name and traditions transferred to the Alpini Battalion "L'Aquila"
    - Alpini Battalion "Cividale", in Chiusaforte -> Alpini Battalion "Cividale" (granted a new flag) ʘ-> Tarvisio
    - Alpini Battalion "L'Aquila", in Tarvisio -> Alpini Battalion "Gemona" (assigned the flag of the 8th Alpini Regiment)
    - Alpini Battalion "Mondovì", in Paluzza, Paularo, and Forni Avoltri -> Alpini Battalion "Tolmezzo" (granted a new flag), "Mondovì" name and traditions transferred to the Alpini Battalion "Orobica" of the 2nd Alpini Regiment (CAR)
  - 11th Alpini Fortification Grouping, in Tolmezzo -> disbanded
    - Command and Services Company, in Tolmezzo -> disbanded
    - Alpini Battalion "Val Tagliamento", in Stazione Carnia, Cavazzo Carnico, Tolmezzo and Paluzza -> Alpini Fortification Battalion "Val Tagliamento" (assigned the flag of the 11th Alpini Fortification Grouping) ʘ-> Tolmezzo
    - Alpini Battalion "Val Fella", in Pontebba and Ugovizza -> disbanded; 269th Company and five reserve companies --> Alpini Fortification Battalion "Val Tagliamento"
  - 3rd Mountain Artillery Regiment, in Gemona -> disbanded
    - Command and Services Battery, in Gemona -> disbanded
    - Mountain Artillery Group "Belluno", in Tarvisio (M56 105 mm pack howitzers) -> disbanded, name and traditions transferred to the Mountain Artillery Group "Osoppo"
    - Mountain Artillery Group "Conegliano", in Gemona (M56 105 mm pack howitzers) -> Mountain Artillery Group "Conegliano" (assigned the flag of the 3rd Mountain Artillery Regiment) ʘ-> Udine
    - Mountain Artillery Group "Udine", in Tolmezzo (M56 105 mm pack howitzers) -> Mountain Artillery Group "Udine" (granted a new flag)
    - Mountain Artillery Group "Pinerolo", in Tolmezzo and Paularo (M56 105 mm pack howitzers) -> disbanded, name and traditions transferred to the Mountain Artillery Group "Susa" of the Alpine Brigade "Taurinense"
    - Mountain Artillery Group "Osoppo", in Pontebba (M56 105mm pack howitzers) -> Mountain Artillery Group "Belluno" (granted a new flag)
  - Alpini Recruits Training Battalion "Julia", in L'Aquila and Teramo -> Alpini Battalion "L'Aquila" (granted a new flag)
  - new: Alpini Battalion "Vicenza" (Recruits Training), in Tolmezzo (assigned the flag of the 9th Alpini Regiment) ʘ-> Codroipo
  - Light Aviation Unit "Julia", at Campoformido Airport (L-19E Bird Dog) -> disbanded
  - new: Alpini Anti-tank Company "Julia", in Cavazzo Carnico
  - Alpini Engineer Company "Julia", in Gemona
  - Alpini Signal Company "Julia", in Udine -> Alpini Command and Signal Unit "Julia"
  - Services Grouping "Julia", in Udine -> Logistic Battalion "Julia" (granted a new flag)
    - Command Platoon, in Udine
    - Supply, Repairs, Recovery Unit "Julia", in Udine -> disbanded
    - Medical Battalion "Julia", in Udine -> disbanded
    - Auto Unit "Julia", in Udine -> disbanded
    - Provisions Supply Company "Julia", in Udine -> disbanded

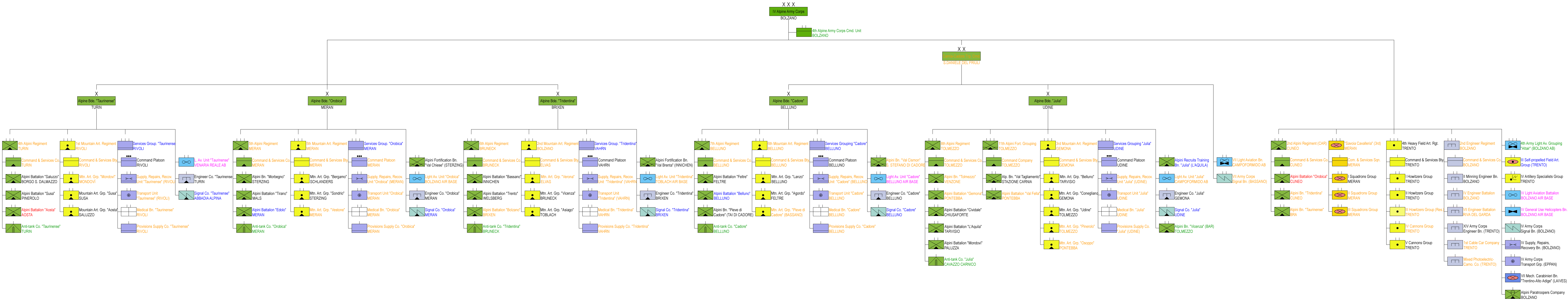
IV Alpine Army Corps 1975 reform changes

=== V Army Corps ===
- V Army Corps, in Vittorio Veneto -> 5th Army Corps
  - new: 5th Army Corps Command Unit, in Vittorio Veneto
  - Lagunari Regiment "Serenissima", in Venice Lido -> Amphibious Troops Command --> Mechanized Division "Folgore"
    - Command and Services Company, in Venice Lido -> Command and Signal Company, in Venice Lido
    - Amphibious Battalion "Marghera", in Venice-Malcontenta -> disbanded
    - Amphibious Battalion "Piave", in Mestre -> 1st Lagunari Battalion "Serenissima" (assigned the flag of the Lagunari Regiment "Serenissima")
    - Amphibious Battalion "Isonzo", in Villa Vicentina -> 41st Mechanized Infantry Battalion "Modena" (assigned the flag of the 41st Infantry Regiment "Modena") --> Mechanized Brigade "Gorizia"
    - XXII Tank Battalion, in San Vito al Tagliamento (M47 Patton tanks) -> 22nd Tank Battalion "M.O. Piccinini" (granted a new flag) -> Leopard 1A2 main battle tanks --> Mechanized Brigade "Gorizia"
    - Signal Company, in Venice Lido -> disbanded
    - Amphibious Transports Company, in Isola di Sant'Andrea and Ca' Vio -> Amphibious Vehicles Battalion "Sile" (granted a new flag)
  - 27th Heavy Self-propelled Artillery Regiment, in Udine --> in 1977 to 3rd Missile Brigade "Aquileia"
    - Command and Services Battery, in Udine
    - I 175/60 Self-propelled Group, in Udine (M107 175 mm self-propelled guns)
    - II 175/60 Self-propelled Group, in Udine (M107 175 mm self-propelled guns)
    - III 175/60 Self-propelled Group, in Udine (M107 175 mm self-propelled guns) -> disbanded
  - 41st Heavy Field Artillery Regiment, in Padua -> disbanded, flag and traditions transferred to the 41st Artillery Specialists Group "Cordenons" flag and traditions transferred to the V Artillery Specialists Group
    - Command and Services Battery, in Padua -> disbanded
    - I 155/45 Cannons Group, in Padua (M59 155 mm towed howitzers) -> disbanded
    - II 155/23 Howitzers Group, in Padua (M114 155 mm towed howitzers) -> disbanded
    - III 155/23 Howitzers Group, in Padua (M114 155 mm towed howitzers) -> disbanded
    - IV 155/23 Howitzers Group (Reserve), in Padua (M114 155 mm towed howitzers) -> disbanded
  - 3rd Sappers Fortification Regiment, in Orcenico Superiore -> disbanded
    - Command and Services Company, in Orcenico Superiore -> disbanded
    - XXX Sappers Fortification Battalion, in Orcenico Superiore -> disbanded
    - XXXI Sappers Fortification Battalion, in Orcenico Superiore -> 3rd Sapper Battalion "Verbano" (assigned the flag of the 3rd Engineer Regiment) ʘ-> Udine
  - 5th Engineer Regiment, in Udine -> disbanded
    - Command and Services Company, in Udine -> disbanded
    - I Mining Engineer Battalion, in Udine -> 1st Mining Engineer Battalion "Garda" (assigned the flag of the 1st Engineer Regiment)
    - IV Mining Engineer Battalion, in Udine -> disbanded
    - V Army Corps Engineer Battalion, in Udine -> 5th Engineer Battalion "Bolsena" (assigned the flag of the 5th Engineer Regiment)
    - 2nd Photoelectric Company, in Udine -> disbanded
    - 2nd Camouflage Company, in Udine -> disbanded
  - V Artillery Specialists Group, in Cordenons -> 41st Artillery Specialists Group "Cordenons" (assigned the flag of the 41st Artillery Regiment "Firenze") --> in 1977 to 3rd Missile Brigade "Aquileia" and ʘ-> Casarsa della Delizia
  - new: 5th Army Light Aviation Grouping "Rigel", at Casarsa Airport (granted a new flag)
  - V Light Aviation Battalion, at Casarsa Airport (L-21B Super Cup) -> 25th Light Airplanes and Helicopters Squadrons Group "Cigno", in Casarsa della Delizia --> 5th Army Light Aviation Grouping "Rigel"
  - V General Use Helicopters Battalion, at Casarsa Airport (AB 204/205 helicopters) -> 55th Multirole Helicopters Squadrons Group "Dragone", in Casarsa della Delizia --> 5th Army Light Aviation Grouping "Rigel"
  - V Army Corps Signal Battalion, in Codroipo -> 5th Signal Battalion "Rolle" (assigned the flag of the 7th Engineer Regiment (Telegraphers)) ʘ-> Sacile
  - V Army Corps Auto Group, in Treviso -> 5th Army Corps Auto Group "Postumia", in Treviso (granted a new flag)
  - V Territorial Auto Group, in Montorio Veronese -> 14th Maneuver Auto Group "Flavia", in Montorio Veronese (granted a new flag)
  - V Supply, Repairs, Recovery Battalion, in Pordenone
  - XIII Mechanized Carabinieri Battalion "Friuli-Venezia Giulia", in Gorizia -> 13th Carabinieri Battalion "M. O. Gallo" (granted a new flag)

==== Armored Division "Ariete" ====
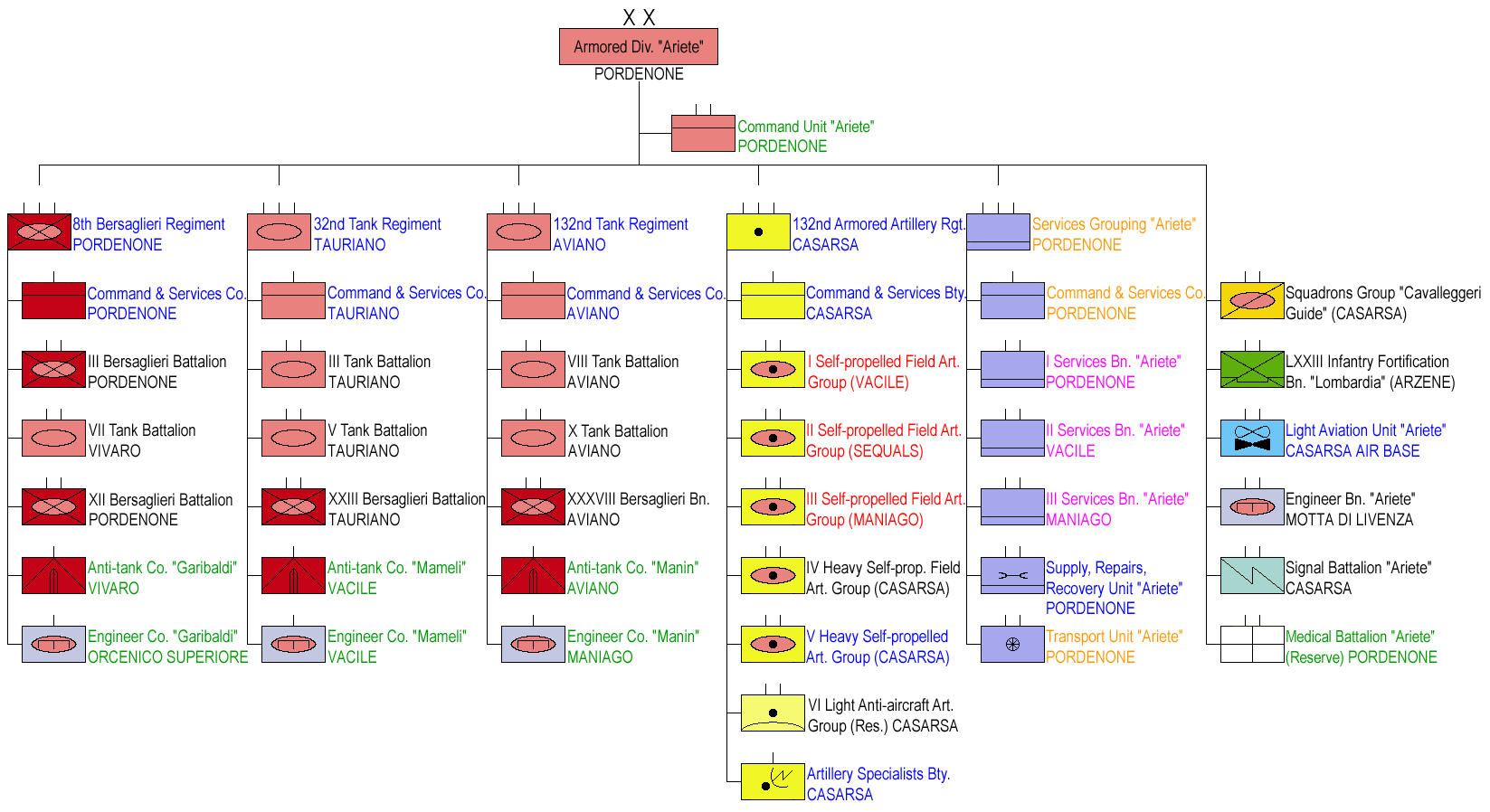
Armored Division "Ariete" 1975 reform changes

- Armored Division "Ariete", in Pordenone
  - new: Command Unit "Ariete", in Pordenone
  - 8th Bersaglieri Regiment, in Pordenone -> 8th Mechanized Brigade "Garibaldi", in Pordenone
    - Command and Services Company, in Pordenone (includes an anti-tank guided missile platoon) -> Command and Signal Unit "Garibaldi"
    - III Bersaglieri Battalion, in Pordenone (M113 armored personnel carriers) -> 3rd Bersaglieri Battalion "Cernaia" (assigned the flag of the 8th Bersaglieri Regiment)
    - VII Tank Battalion, in Vivaro (M60A1 Patton main battle tanks) -> 7th Tank Battalion "M.O. Di Dio" (granted a new flag)
    - XII Bersaglieri Battalion, in Pordenone (M113 armored personnel carriers) -> 26th Bersaglieri Battalion "Castelfidardo" (assigned the flag of the 4th Bersaglieri Regiment)
    - new: Anti-tank Company "Garibaldi", in Vivaro
    - new: Engineer Company "Garibaldi", in Orcenico Superiore
  - 32nd Tank Regiment, in Tauriano -> 32nd Armored Brigade "Mameli"
    - Command and Services Company, in Tauriano (includes an anti-tank guided missile platoon) -> Command and Signal Unit "Mameli"
    - III Tank Battalion, in Tauriano (M60A1 Patton main battle tanks) -> 3rd Tank Battalion "M.O. Galas" (assigned the flag of the 32nd Tank Regiment)
    - V Tank Battalion, in Tauriano (M60A1 Patton main battle tanks) -> 5th Tank Battalion "M.O. Chiamenti" (granted a new flag)
    - XXIII Bersaglieri Battalion, in Tauriano (M113 armored personnel carriers) -> 23rd Bersaglieri Battalion "Castel di Borgo" (assigned the flag of the 12th Bersaglieri Regiment)
    - new: Anti-tank Company "Mameli", in Vacile
    - new: Engineer Company "Mameli", in Vacile
  - 132nd Tank Regiment, in Aviano -> 132nd Armored Brigade "Manin"
    - Command and Services Company, in Aviano (includes an anti-tank guided missile platoon) -> Command and Signal Unit "Manin"
    - VIII Tank Battalion, in Aviano (M60A1 Patton main battle tanks) -> 8th Tank Battalion "M.O. Secchiaroli" (assigned the flag of the 132nd Tank Regiment)
    - X Tank Battalion, in Aviano (M60A1 Patton main battle tanks) -> 10th Tank Battalion "M.O. Bruno" (assigned the flag of the 133rd Tank Regiment)
    - XXXVIII Bersaglieri Battalion, in Aviano (M113 armored personnel carriers) -> 27th Bersaglieri Battalion "Jamiano" (assigned the flag of the 11th Bersaglieri Regiment)
    - new: Anti-tank Company "Manin", in Aviano
    - new: Engineer Company "Manin", in Maniago
  - 132nd Armored Artillery Regiment, in Casarsa della Delizia -> Divisional Artillery Command
    - Command and Services Battery, in Casarsa della Delizia -> Artillery Specialists Group "Ariete"
    - I Self-propelled Field Artillery Group, in Vacile (M109G 155 mm self-propelled howitzers) -> 12th Self-propelled Field Artillery Group "Capua" (assigned the flag of the 12th Artillery Regiment "Savona") --> 32nd Armored Brigade "Mameli"
    - II Self-propelled Field Artillery Group, in Sequals (M109G 155 mm self-propelled howitzers) -> 19th Self-propelled Field Artillery Group "Rialto" (assigned the flag of the 19th Artillery Regiment "Venezia") --> 8th Mechanized Brigade "Garibaldi"
    - III Self-propelled Field Artillery Group, in Maniago (M109G 155 mm self-propelled howitzers) -> 20th Self-propelled Field Artillery Group "Piave" (assigned the flag of the 20th Artillery Regiment "Piave") --> 132nd Armored Brigade "Manin"
    - IV Heavy Self-propelled Field Artillery Group, in Casarsa della Delizia (M109G 155 mm self-propelled howitzers) -> 132nd Heavy Self-propelled Field Artillery Group "Rovereto" (assigned the flag of the 132nd Armored Artillery Regiment "Ariete")
    - V Heavy Self-propelled Artillery Group, in Casarsa della Delizia (M55 203 mm self-propelled howitzers) -> 108th Heavy Self-propelled Field Artillery Group "Cosseria" (assigned the flag of the 108th Artillery Regiment "Cosseria") -> M109G 155 mm self-propelled howitzers
    - VI Light Anti-aircraft Artillery Group (Reserve), in Casarsa della Delizia (Bofors 40 mm anti-aircraft guns and 12.7mm anti-aircraft machine guns) -> 14th Light Anti-aircraft Artillery Group "Astore" (Reserve)
    - Artillery Specialists Battery, in Casarsa della Delizia -> Artillery Specialists Group "Ariete"
  - Squadrons Group "Cavalleggeri Guide", in Casarsa della Delizia (Fiat Campagnola reconnaissance vehicles and M47 Patton tanks) -> 19th Squadrons Group "Cavalleggeri Guide" (assigned the flag of the Regiment "Cavalleggeri Guide" (19th))
  - LXXIII Infantry Fortification Battalion "Lombardia", in Arzene and Latisana -> 73rd Infantry Fortification Battalion "Lombardia", in Arzene (assigned the flag of the 73rd Infantry Regiment "Lombardia") and 74th Infantry Fortification Battalion "Pontida" (Reserve), in Latisana (Unit would have been activated in case of war and would have been assigned the flag of the 74th Infantry Regiment "Lombardia")
  - Light Aviation Unit "Ariete", at Casarsa Airport (L-19E Bird Dog light aircraft and AB 206 reconnaissance helicopters) -> 49th Reconnaissance Helicopters Squadrons Group "Capricorno"
  - Engineer Battalion "Ariete", in Motta di Livenza -> 132nd Engineer Battalion "Livenza" (assigned the flag of the 11th Engineer Regiment)
  - Signal Battalion "Ariete", in Casarsa della Delizia -> 232nd Signal Battalion "Fadalto" (granted a new flag)
  - Services Grouping "Ariete", in Pordenone-> disbanded
    - Command and Services Company, in Pordenone -> disbanded
    - Supply, Repairs, Recovery Unit "Ariete", in Pordenone -> Logistic Battalion "Ariete" (granted a new flag) ʘ-> Casarsa della Delizia
    - Auto Unit "Ariete", in Pordenone -> disbanded
    - I Services Battalion "Ariete", in Pordenone -> Logistic Battalion "Garibaldi" (granted a new flag) --> 8th Mechanized Brigade "Garibaldi"
    - II Services Battalion "Ariete", in Vacile -> Logistic Battalion "Mameli" (granted a new flag) --> 32nd Armored Brigade "Mameli"
    - III Services Battalion "Ariete", in Maniago -> Logistic Battalion "Manin" (granted a new flag) --> 132nd Armored Brigade "Manin"
  - new: Medical Battalion "Ariete" (Reserve), in Pordenone

==== Infantry Division "Folgore" ====
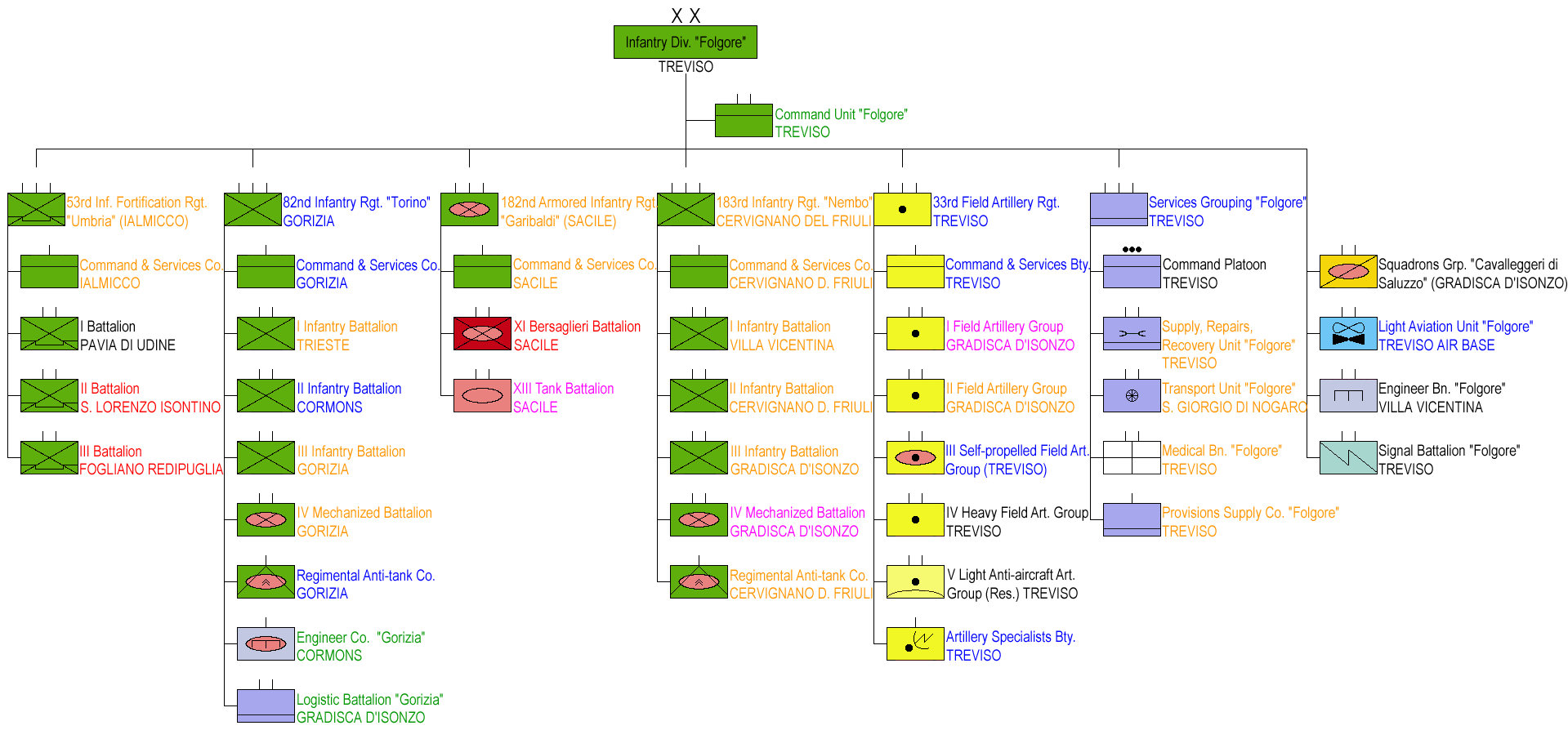
Infantry Division "Folgore" 1975 reform changes

- Infantry Division "Folgore", in Treviso -> Mechanized Division "Folgore"
  - new: Command Unit "Folgore", in Treviso
  - 53rd Infantry Fortification Regiment "Umbria", in Ialmicco -> disbanded
    - Command and Services Company, in Ialmicco -> disbanded
    - I Battalion, in Pavia di Udine and Brazzano -> 53rd Infantry Fortification Battalion "Umbria" (assigned the flag of the 53rd Infantry Regiment "Umbria")
    - II Battalion, in San Lorenzo Isontino, Farra d'Isonzo, and Lucinico -> 63rd Infantry Fortification Battalion "Cagliari" (assigned the flag of the 63rd Infantry Regiment "Cagliari") --> Mechanized Brigade "Gorizia"
    - III Battalion, in Fogliano Redipuglia and Perteole -> 33rd Infantry Fortification Battalion "Ardenza" (assigned the flag of the 33rd Infantry Regiment "Livorno") --> Mechanized Brigade "Gorizia"
  - 82nd Infantry Regiment "Torino", in Gorizia -> Mechanized Brigade "Gorizia"
    - Command and Services Company, in Gorizia -> Command and Signal Unit "Gorizia"
    - I Infantry Battalion, in Trieste -> disbanded
    - II Infantry Battalion, in Cormons -> 82nd Mechanized Infantry Battalion "Torino" (assigned the flag of the 82nd Infantry Regiment "Torino")
    - III Infantry Battalion, in Gorizia -> disbanded
    - IV Mechanized Battalion, in Gorizia (M113 armored personnel carriers and M47 tanks) -> disbanded
    - Regimental Anti-tank Company, in Gorizia (anti-tank guided missiles and M47 tanks) -> Anti-tank Company "Gorizia"
    - new: Engineer Company "Gorizia", in Cormons
    - new: Logistic Battalion "Gorizia", in Gradisca d'Isonzo (granted a new flag)
  - 182nd Armored Infantry Regiment "Garibaldi", in Sacile -> disbanded
    - Command and Services Company, in Sacile (includes an anti-tank guided missile platoon) -> disbanded
    - XI Bersaglieri Battalion, in Sacile (M113 armored personnel carriers) -> 11th Bersaglieri Battalion "Caprera" (assigned the flag of the 182nd Armored Infantry Regiment "Garibaldi") ʘ-> Orcenico Superiore --> 8th Mechanized Brigade "Garibaldi"
    - XIII Tank Battalion, in Sacile (M47 Patton tanks) -> 13th Tank Battalion "M.O. Pascucci" (granted a new flag) ʘ-> Cordenons --> Mechanized Brigade "Brescia", and in 1977 -> Leopard 1A2 main battle tanks
  - 183rd Infantry Regiment "Nembo", in Cervignano del Friuli -> disbanded
    - Command and Services Company, in Cervignano del Friuli -> disbanded
    - I Infantry Battalion, in Villa Vicentina -> disbanded
    - II Infantry Battalion, in Cervignano del Friuli -> disbanded
    - III Infantry Battalion, in Gradisca d'Isonzo -> disbanded
    - IV Mechanized Battalion, in Gradisca d'Isonzo (M113 armored personnel carriers and M47 tanks) -> 183rd Mechanized Infantry Battalion "Nembo" (assigned the flag of the 183rd Paratroopers Regiment "Nembo") --> Mechanized Brigade "Gorizia"
    - Regimental Anti-tank Company, in Cervignano del Friuli (anti-tank guided missiles and M47 tanks) -> disbanded
  - 33rd Field Artillery Regiment, in Treviso -> Divisional Artillery Command
    - Command and Services Battery, in Treviso -> Artillery Specialists Group "Folgore"
    - I Field Artillery Group, in Gradisca d'Isonzo (M101 105 mm towed howitzers) -> 46th Field Artillery Group "Trento" (assigned the flag of the 46th Artillery Regiment "Trento") -> M114 155 mm towed howitzers --> Mechanized Brigade "Gorizia"
    - II Field Artillery Group, in Gradisca d'Isonzo (M101 105 mm towed howitzers) -> disbanded
    - III Self-propelled Field Artillery Group, in Treviso (M7 105 mm self-propelled howitzers) -> 33rd Heavy Self-propelled Field Artillery Group "Terni" (assigned the flag of the 33rd Artillery Regiment "Acqui") -> M109G 155 mm self-propelled howitzers
    - IV Heavy Field Artillery Group, in Treviso (M114 155 mm towed howitzers) -> 184th Heavy Self-propelled Field Artillery Group "Filottrano" (assigned the flag of the 184th Artillery Regiment "Nembo") ʘ-> Padua
    - V Light Anti-aircraft Artillery Group (Reserve), in Treviso (Bofors 40 mm anti-aircraft guns and 12.7mm anti-aircraft machine guns) -> 13th Light Anti-aircraft Artillery Group "Condor" (Reserve)
    - Artillery Specialists Battery, in Treviso -> Artillery Specialists Group "Folgore"
  - Squadrons Group "Cavalleggeri di Saluzzo", in Gradisca d'Isonzo (Fiat Campagnola reconnaissance vehicles and M47 Patton tanks) -> 12th Squadrons Group "Cavalleggeri di Saluzzo" (assigned the flag of the Regiment "Cavalleggeri di Saluzzo" (12th)) ʘ-> Gorizia
  - Light Aviation Unit "Folgore", at Treviso Airport (L-19E Bird Dog light aircraft and AB 206 reconnaissance helicopters) -> 47th Reconnaissance Helicopters Squadrons Group "Levrieri"
  - Engineer Battalion "Folgore", in Villa Vicentina -> 184th Engineer Battalion "Santerno" (assigned the flag of the 8th Engineer Regiment)
  - Signal Battalion "Folgore", in Treviso -> 184th Signal Battalion "Cansiglio" (granted a new flag)
  - Services Grouping "Folgore", in Treviso -> Logistic Battalion "Folgore" (granted a new flag)
    - Command Platoon, in Treviso
    - Supply, Repairs, Recovery Unit "Folgore", in Treviso -> disbanded
    - Auto Unit "Folgore", in San Giorgio di Nogaro -> disbanded
    - Medical Battalion "Folgore", in Treviso -> Medical Battalion "Folgore" (Reserve)
    - Provisions Supply Company "Folgore", in Treviso -> disbanded

==== Infantry Division "Mantova" ====
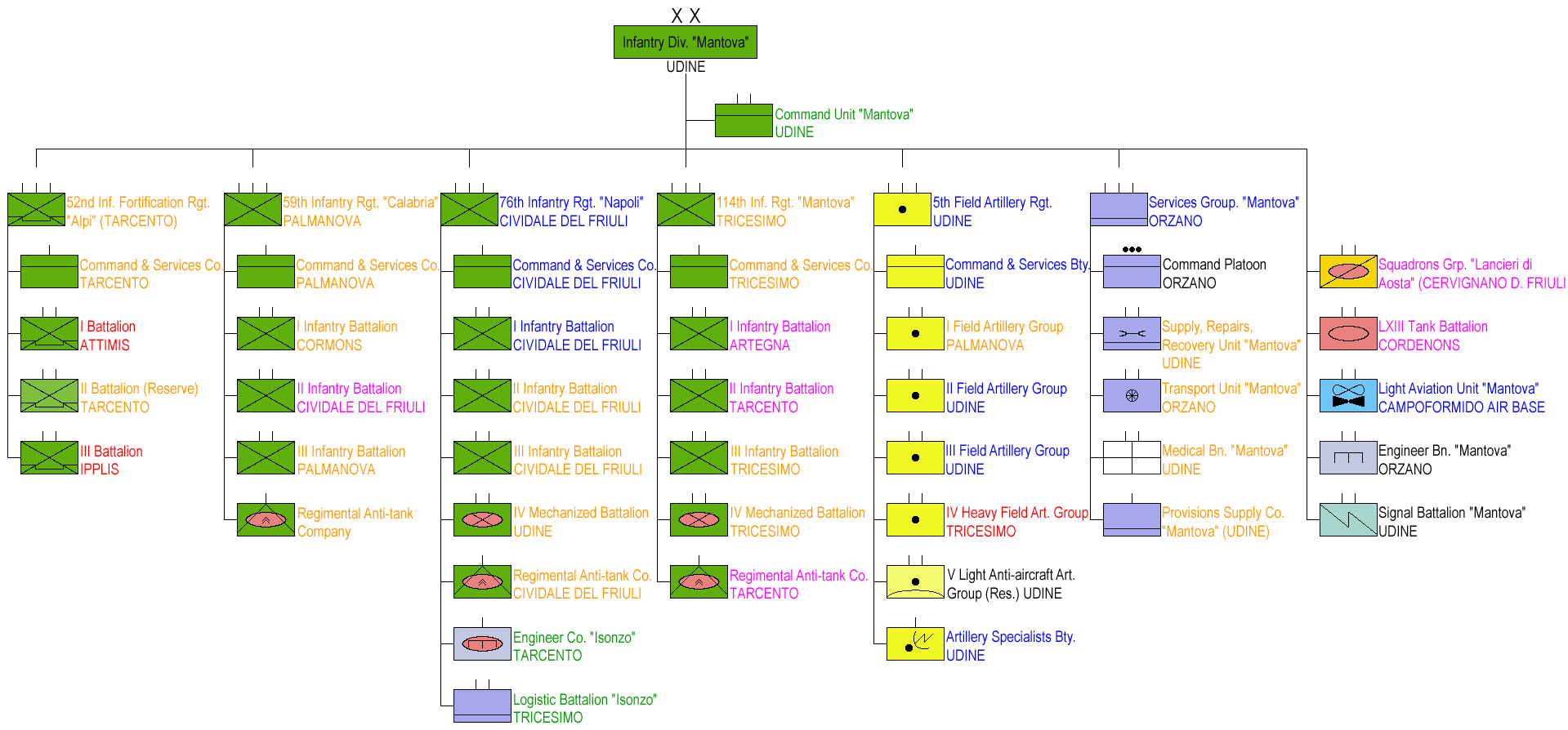
Infantry Division "Mantova" 1975 reform changes

- Infantry Division "Mantova", in Udine -> Mechanized Division "Mantova"
  - new: Command Unit "Mantova", in Udine
  - 52nd Infantry Fortification Regiment "Alpi", in Tarcento -> disbanded
    - Command and Services Company, in Tarcento -> disbanded
    - I Battalion, in Tarcento and Attimis -> 52nd Infantry Fortification Battalion "Alpi" (assigned the flag of the 52nd Infantry Regiment "Alpi") ʘ-> Attimis --> Mechanized Brigade "Isonzo"
    - II Battalion (Reserve), in Tarcento -> disbanded
    - III Battalion, in Ipplis, Grupignano, and Purgessimo -> 120th Infantry Fortification Battalion "Fornovo" (assigned the flag of the 120th Infantry Regiment "Emilia") --> Mechanized Brigade "Isonzo"
  - 59th Infantry Regiment "Calabria", in Palmanova -> disbanded
    - Command and Services Company, in Palmanova -> disbanded
    - I Infantry Battalion, in Cormons -> disbanded
    - II Infantry Battalion, in Cividale del Friuli -> 59th Mechanized Infantry Battalion "Calabria" (assigned the flag of the 59th Infantry Regiment "Calabria") --> Mechanized Brigade "Isonzo"
    - III Infantry Battalion, in Palmanova -> disbanded
    - Regimental Anti-tank Company, in (?) (anti-tank guided missiles and M47 tanks) -> disbanded
  - 76th Infantry Regiment "Napoli", in Cividale del Friuli -> Mechanized Brigade "Isonzo"
    - Command and Services Company, in Cividale del Friuli -> Command and Signal Unit "Isonzo"
    - I Infantry Battalion, in Cividale del Friuli -> 76th Mechanized Infantry Battalion "Napoli" (assigned the flag of the 76th Infantry Regiment "Napoli")
    - II Infantry Battalion, in Cividale del Friuli -> disbanded
    - III Infantry Battalion, in Cividale del Friuli -> disbanded
    - IV Mechanized Battalion, in Udine (M113 armored personnel carriers and M47 tanks) -> disbanded
    - Regimental Anti-tank Company, in Cividale del Friuli (anti-tank guided missiles and M47 tanks) -> disbanded
    - new: Engineer Company "Isonzo", in Tarcento
    - new: Logistic Battalion "Isonzo", in Tricesimo (granted a new flag)
  - 114th Infantry Regiment "Mantova", in Tricesimo -> disbanded
    - Command and Services Company, in Tricesimo -> disbanded
    - I Infantry Battalion, in Artegna -> 7th Infantry Battalion "Cuneo" (Recruits Training) (assigned the flag of the 7th Infantry Regiment "Cuneo") --> 5th Army Corps ʘ-> Udine
    - II Infantry Battalion, in Tarcento -> 114th Mechanized Infantry Battalion "Moriago" (assigned the flag of the 114th Infantry Regiment "Mantova") --> Mechanized Brigade "Isonzo", and in 1976 ʘ-> Tricesimo
    - III Infantry Battalion, in Tricesimo -> disbanded
    - IV Mechanized Battalion, in Tricesimo (M113 armored personnel carriers and M47 tanks) -> disbanded
    - Regimental Anti-tank Company, in Tarcento (anti-tank guided missiles and M47 tanks) -> Anti-tank Company "Isonzo"
  - 5th Field Artillery Regiment, in Udine -> Divisional Artillery Command
    - Command and Services Battery, in Udine -> Artillery Specialists Group "Mantova"
    - I Field Artillery Group, in Palmanova (M101 105 mm towed howitzers) -> disbanded
    - II Field Artillery Group, in Udine (M101 105 mm towed howitzers) -> 5th Heavy Self-propelled Field Artillery Group "Superga" (assigned the flag of the 5th Artillery Regiment "Superga") -> M109G 155 mm self-propelled howitzers
    - III Field Artillery Group, in Udine (M101 105 mm towed howitzers) -> 155th Heavy Self-propelled Field Artillery Group "Emilia" (assigned the flag of the 155th Artillery Regiment "Emilia") -> M109G 155 mm self-propelled howitzers
    - IV Heavy Field Artillery Group, in Tricesimo (M114 155 mm towed howitzers) -> 28th Field Artillery Group "Livorno" (assigned the flag of the 28th Artillery Regiment "Livorno") --> Mechanized Brigade "Isonzo"
    - V Light Anti-aircraft Artillery Group (Reserve), in Udine (Bofors 40 mm anti-aircraft guns and 12.7mm anti-aircraft machine guns) -> 12th Light Anti-aircraft Artillery Group "Nibbio" (Reserve)
    - Artillery Specialists Battery, in Udine -> Artillery Specialists Group "Mantova"
  - Squadrons Group "Lancieri di Aosta", in Cervignano del Friuli (Fiat Campagnola reconnaissance vehicles and M47 Patton tanks) -> 6th Tank Squadrons Group "Lancieri di Aosta" (assigned the flag of the Regiment "Lancieri di Aosta" (6th)) -> Leopard 1A2 main battle tanks --> Armored Brigade "Vittorio Veneto"
  - LXIII Tank Battalion, in Cordenons (M47 Patton tanks) -> 63rd Tank Battalion "M.O. Fioritto" (granted a new flag) -> Leopard 1A2 main battle tanks --> Mechanized Brigade "Isonzo"
  - Light Aviation Unit "Mantova", at Campoformido Airport (L-19E Bird Dog light aircraft and AB 206 reconnaissance helicopters) -> 48th Reconnaissance Helicopters Squadrons Group "Pavone"
  - Engineer Battalion "Mantova", in Orzano di Remanzacco -> 104th Engineer Battalion "Torre" (assigned the flag of the 7th Engineer Regiment)
  - Signal Battalion "Mantova", in Udine -> 107th Signal Battalion "Predil" (granted a new flag)
  - Services Grouping "Mantova", in Udine -> Logistic Battalion "Mantova" (granted a new flag)
    - Command Platoon, in Udine
    - Supply, Repairs, Recovery Unit "Mantova", in Udine -> disbanded
    - Auto Unit "Mantova", in Orzano di Remanzacco -> disbanded
    - Medical Battalion "Mantova", in Udine -> Medical Battalion "Mantova" (Reserve)
    - Provisions Supply Company "Mantova", in Udine -> disbanded

==== Cavalry Brigade "Pozzuolo del Friuli" ====
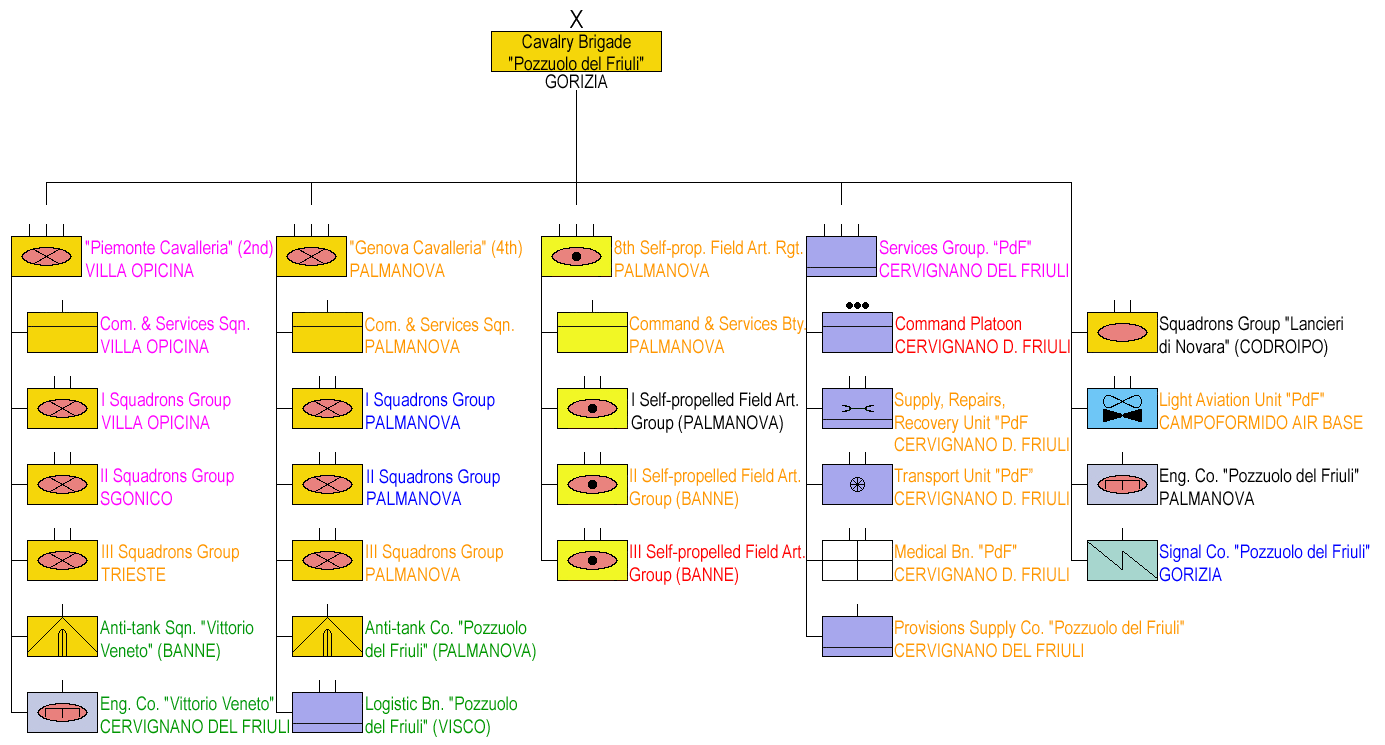
Cavalry Brigade "Pozzuolo del Friuli" 1975 reform changes

- Cavalry Brigade "Pozzuolo del Friuli", in Gorizia -> Armored Brigade "Pozzuolo del Friuli" ʘ-> Palmanova --> Mechanized Division "Mantova"
  - Regiment "Piemonte Cavalleria" (2nd), in Villa Opicina -> Armored Brigade "Vittorio Veneto" --> Mechanized Division "Folgore"
    - Command and Services Squadron, in Villa Opicina -> Command and Signal Unit "Vittorio Veneto"
    - I Squadrons Group, in Villa Opicina (Leopard 1A2 main battle tanks and M113 APCs) -> 2nd Mechanized Squadrons Group "Piemonte Cavalleria" (assigned the flag of the Regiment "Piemonte Cavalleria" (2nd)) -> M113 APCs --> Armored Brigade "Vittorio Veneto"
    - II Squadrons Group, in Sgonico (Leopard 1A2 main battle tanks and M113 APCs) -> 9th Tank Squadrons Group "Lancieri di Firenze" (assigned the flag of the Regiment "Lancieri di Firenze" (9th)) -> Leopard 1A2 main battle tanks --> Armored Brigade "Vittorio Veneto"
    - III Squadrons Group, in Trieste (Leopard 1A2 main battle tanks and M113 APCs) -> disbanded
    - new: Anti-tank Squadron "Vittorio Veneto", in Banne
    - new: Engineer Company "Vittorio Veneto", in Cervignano del Friuli
  - Regiment "Genova Cavalleria" (4th), in Palmanova -> disbanded
    - Command and Services Squadron, in Palmanova -> disbanded
    - I Squadrons Group, in Palmanova (Leopard 1A2 main battle tanks and M113 APCs) -> 4th Mechanized Squadrons Group "Genova Cavalleria" (assigned the flag of the Regiment "Genova Cavalleria" (4th)) -> M113 APCs
    - II Squadrons Group, in Palmanova (Leopard 1A2 main battle tanks and M113 APCs) -> 28th Tank Squadrons Group "Cavalleggeri di Treviso" (assigned the flag of the Regiment "Cavalleggeri di Treviso" (28th)) -> Leopard 1A2 main battle tanks
    - III Squadrons Group, in Palmanova (Leopard 1A2 main battle tanks and M113 APCs) -> disbanded
  - 8th Self-propelled Field Artillery Regiment, in Palmanova -> disbanded
    - Command and Services Battery, in Palmanova -> disbanded
    - I Self-propelled Field Artillery Group, in Visco (M109G 155 mm self-propelled howitzers) -> 120th Self-propelled Field Artillery Group "Po" (assigned the flag of the 120th Motorized Artillery Regiment) ʘ-> Palmanova
    - II Self-propelled Field Artillery Group, in Banne (M109G 155 mm self-propelled howitzers) -> disbanded
    - III Self-propelled Field Artillery Group, in Banne (M109G 155 mm self-propelled howitzers) -> 8th Self-propelled Field Artillery Group "Pasubio" (assigned the flag of the 8th Artillery Regiment "Pasubio") --> Armored Brigade "Vittorio Veneto"
  - Squadrons Group "Lancieri di Novara", in Codroipo (Leopard 1A2 main battle tanks) -> 5th Tank Squadrons Group "Lancieri di Novara" (assigned the flag of the Regiment "Lancieri di Novara" (5th))
  - Light Aviation Unit "Pozzuolo del Friuli", in Campoformido (L-19E Bird Dog) -> disbanded
  - new: Anti-tank Squadron "Pozzuolo del Friuli", in Palmanova
  - Engineer Company "Pozzuolo del Friuli", in Palmanova
  - Signal Company "Pozzuolo del Friuli", in Gorizia -> Command and Signal Unit "Pozzuolo del Friuli" ʘ-> Palmanova
  - new: Logistic Battalion "Pozzuolo del Friuli", in Visco (granted a new flag)
  - Services Grouping "Pozzuolo del Friuli", in Cervignano del Friuli -> Logistic Battalion "Vittorio Veneto" (granted a new flag) --> Armored Brigade "Vittorio Veneto"
    - Command Platoon, in Cervignano del Friuli
    - Supply, Repairs, Recovery Unit "Pozzuolo del Friuli", in Cervignano del Friuli -> disbanded
    - Medical Battalion "Pozzuolo del Friuli", in Cervignano del Friuli -> disbanded
    - Auto Unit "Pozzuolo del Friuli", in Cervignano del Friuli -> disbanded
    - Provisions Supply Company "Pozzuolo del Friuli", in Cervignano del Friuli -> disbanded

==== III Missile Brigade ====
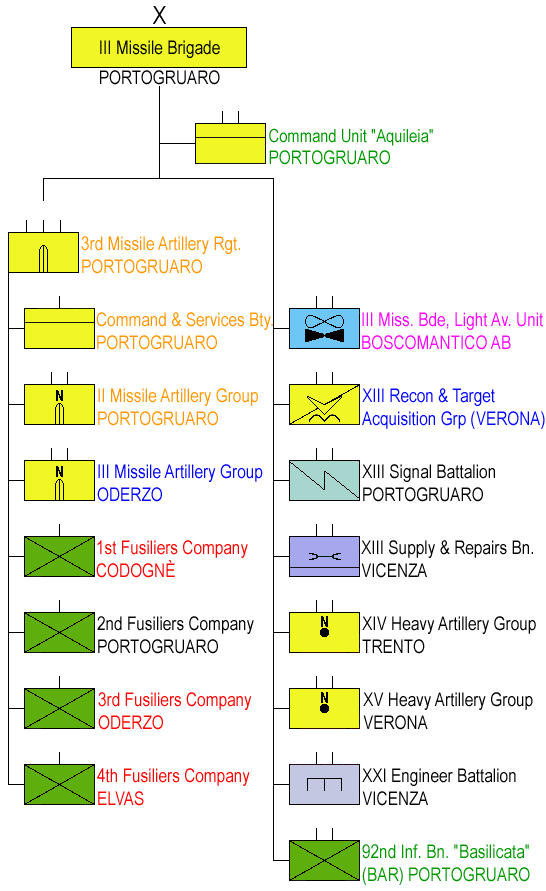
III Missile Brigade 1975 reform changes

- III Missile Brigade, in Portogruaro -> 3rd Missile Brigade "Aquileia"
  - new: Command Unit "Aquileia", in Portogruaro
  - 3rd Missile Artillery Regiment, in Portogruaro -> disbanded
    - Command and Services Battery, in Portogruaro -> disbanded
    - I Missile Artillery Group, in Codogné (MGR-1 Honest John surface-to-surface missiles) (already disbanded 31 July 1973)
    - II Missile Artillery Group, in Portogruaro (MGR-1 Honest John surface-to-surface missiles) -> disbanded
    - III Missile Artillery Group, in Oderzo (MGR-1 Honest John surface-to-surface missiles) -> 3rd Missile Artillery Group "Volturno" (assigned the flag of the 3rd Army Artillery Regiment) -> MGM-52 Lance
    - IV Missile Artillery Group, in Elvas (MGR-1 Honest John surface-to-surface missiles) (already disbanded 31 July 1973)
    - 1st Fusiliers Company, in Codogné
    - 2nd Fusiliers Company, in Portogruaro ʘ-> Vicenza --> 3rd Missile Brigade "Aquileia"
    - 3rd Fusiliers Company, in Oderzo
    - 4th Fusiliers Company, in Elvas --> 1st Heavy Artillery Group "Adige"
  - XIII Reconnaissance and Target Acquisition Group (GRACO), in Verona -> 13th Target Acquisition Group "Aquileia"
    - Command and Services Battery
    - Reconnaissance and Target Acquisition Battery
    - Unmanned Aircraft Battery (MQM-57 "Falconer" drones) -> Canadair CL-89B "Midge" drones
  - III Missile Brigade Light Aviation Unit, at Boscomantico Airport -> Air Component --> 13th Target Acquisition Group "Aquileia"
    - Light Airplanes Section (L-19E Bird Dog) -> 398th Light Airplanes Squadron -> SM.1019A planes
    - General Use Helicopters Section (AB-204B helicopters) -> 598th Multirole Helicopters Squadron
    - Maintenance Section -> Light Airplanes Maintenance Squadron
  - XIII Signal Battalion, in Portogruaro -> 13th Signal Battalion "Mauria" (granted a new flag)
  - XIII Supply and Repairs Battalion, in Vicenza
  - XIV Heavy Artillery Group, in Trento (M115 203 mm towed howitzers) -> 1st Heavy Artillery Group "Adige" (assigned the flag of the 1st Army Artillery Regiment) ʘ-> Elvas
  - XV Heavy Artillery Group, in Verona (M115 203 mm towed howitzers) -> 9th Heavy Artillery Group "Rovigo" (assigned the flag of the 9th Army Artillery Regiment)
  - XXI Engineer Battalion, in Vicenza -> 21st Engineer Battalion "Timavo" (assigned the flag of the 21st Engineer Regiment)
  - new: 92nd Infantry Battalion "Basilicata" (Recruits Training), in Portogruaro (assigned the flag of the 92nd Infantry Regiment "Basilicata")

==== Trieste Troops Command ====
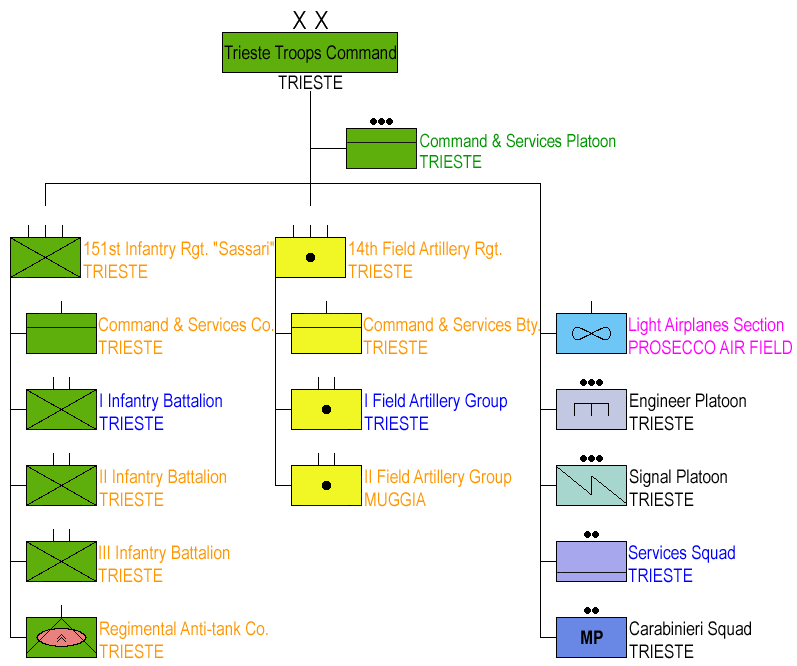
Trieste Troops Command 1975 reform changes

- Trieste Troops Command, in Trieste
  - new: Command and Services Platoon, in Trieste
  - 151st Infantry Regiment "Sassari", in Trieste -> disbanded, flag and traditions transferred to the II Battalion of the 152nd Infantry Regiment "Sassari"
    - Command and Services Company, in Trieste -> disbanded
    - I Infantry Battalion, in Trieste -> 1st Motorized Infantry Battalion "San Giusto" (assigned the flag of the 1st Infantry Regiment "Re")
    - II Infantry Battalion, in Trieste -> disbanded and equipment stored (In case of war would have been activated as 43rd Motorized Infantry Battalion "Forlì" and would have been assigned the flag of the 43rd Infantry Regiment "Forlì")
    - III Infantry Battalion, in Trieste -> disbanded and equipment stored (In case of war would have been activated as 255th Motorized Infantry Battalion "Veneto" and would have been assigned the flag of the 255th Infantry Regiment "Veneto")
    - Regimental Anti-tank Company, in Trieste (anti-tank guided missiles and M47 tanks) -> disbanded
  - 14th Field Artillery Regiment, in Trieste -> disbanded
    - Command and Services Battery, in Trieste -> disbanded
    - I Field Artillery Group, in Trieste (M101 105 mm towed howitzers) -> 14th Field Artillery Group "Murge" (assigned the flag of the 14th Artillery Regiment "Murge") -> M114 155 mm towed howitzers
    - II Field Artillery Group, in Muggia (M101 105 mm towed howitzers) -> disbanded
  - Engineer Platoon, in Trieste
  - Signal Platoon, in Trieste
  - Light Airplanes Section, at Trieste-Prosecco Heliport -> 554th Multirole Helicopters Squadron / 55th Multirole Helicopters Squadrons Group "Dragone" / 5th Army Light Aviation Grouping "Rigel"
  - Services Squad, in Trieste -> Provisions Supply Platoon
  - Carabinieri Squad, in Trieste

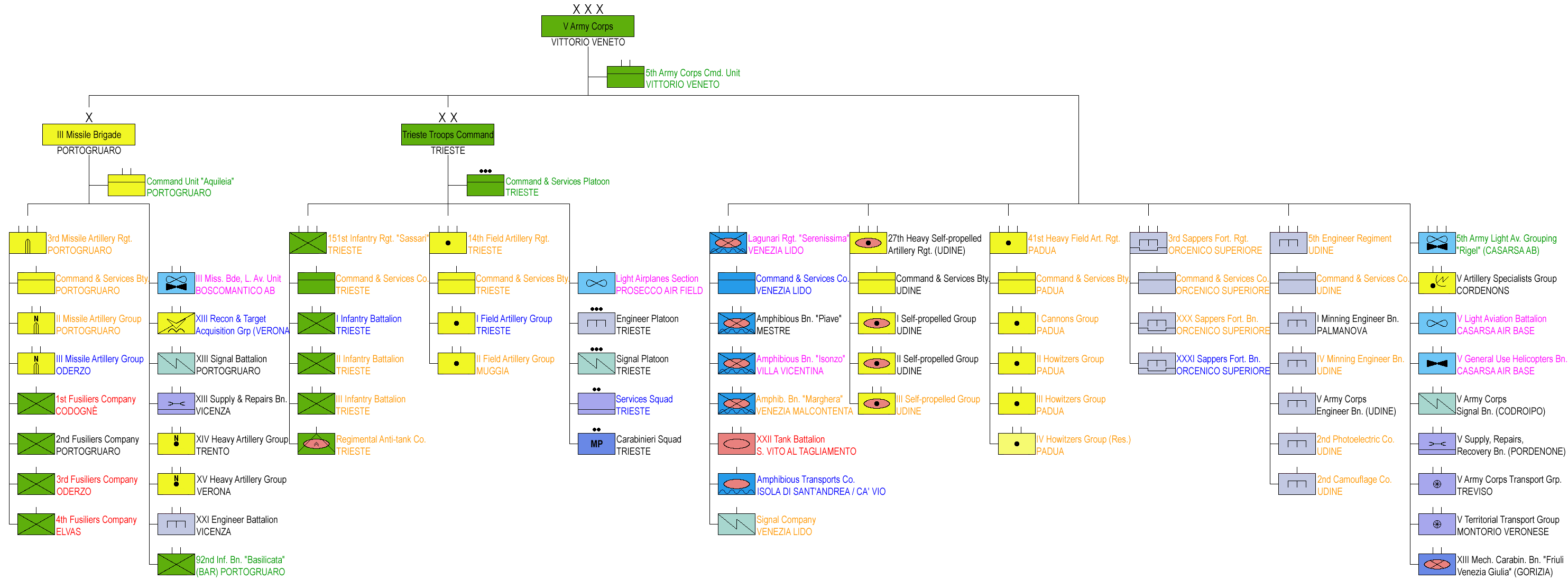
V Army Corps support units 1975 reform changes

=== Northwestern Military Region - I C.M.T. ===
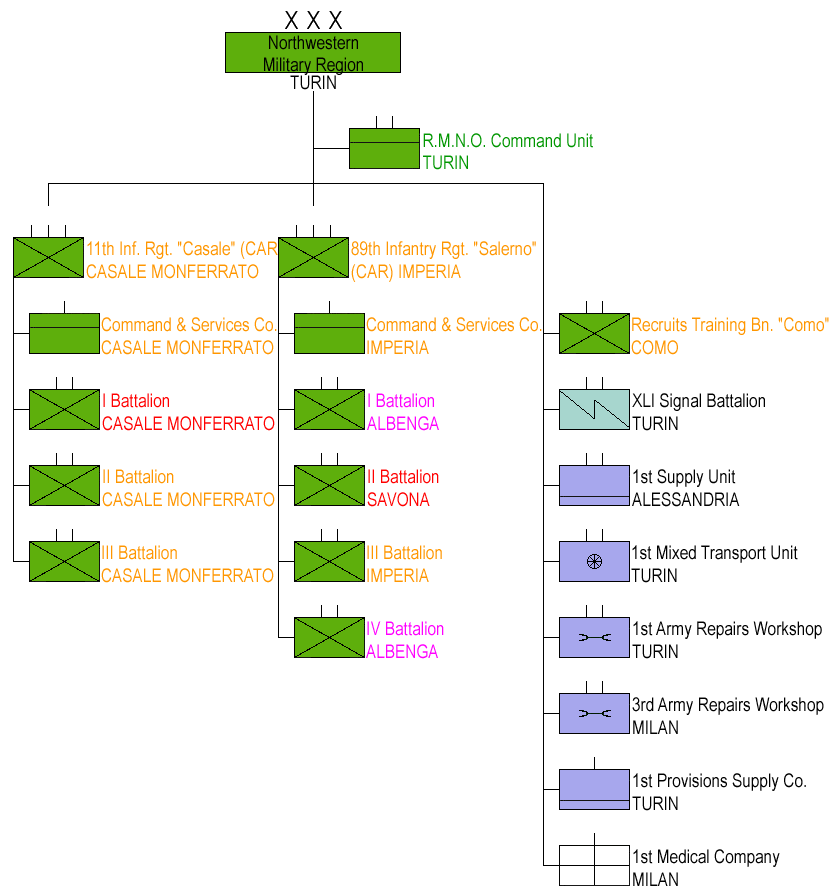
Northwestern Military Region 1975 reform changes

- Northwestern Military Region - I C.M.T., in Turin (Regione Militare Nord Ovest (R.M.N.O.): Aosta, Liguria (minus La Spezia province), Lombardy (minus Brescia and Mantua provinces), and Piedmont regions)
  - new: R.M.N.O. Command Unit, in Turin
  - 11th Infantry Regiment "Casale" (CAR), in Casale Monferrato -> disbanded
    - Command and Services Company, in Casale Monferrato -> disbanded
    - I Battalion, in Casale Monferrato -> 11th Infantry Battalion "Casale" (Recruits Training) (assigned the flag of the 11th Infantry Regiment "Casale") --> Mechanized Division "Mantova"
    - II Battalion, in Casale Monferrato -> disbanded
    - III Battalion, in Casale Monferrato -> disbanded
  - 89th Infantry Regiment "Salerno" (CAR), in Imperia -> disbanded, name, flag, and traditions transferred to the II Armored Troops Recruits Training Battalion of the Southern Military Region
    - Command and Services Company, in Imperia -> disbanded
    - I Battalion, in Imperia -> disbanded
    - II Battalion, in Diano Castello -> Detachment 26th Infantry Battalion "Bergamo" (Recruits Training); in 1977 -> 72nd Infantry Battalion "Puglie" (Recruits Training) (assigned the flag of the 72nd Infantry Regiment "Puglie") --> Armored Division "Centauro"
    - III Battalion, in Albenga -> Detachment 16th Infantry Battalion "Savona" (Recruits Training); in 1977 -> 14th Bersaglieri (Recruits Training) Battalion "Sernaglia" (Recruits Training) (assigned the flag of the 5th Bersaglieri Regiment) --> Armored Division "Ariete"
    - IV Battalion, in Savona -> 16th Infantry Battalion "Savona" (Recruits Training) (assigned the flag of the 16th Infantry Regiment "Savona") --> Armored Division "Ariete"
  - Recruits Training Battalion "Como", in Como -> disbanded
  - XLI Signal Battalion, in Turin -> 41st Signal Battalion "Frejus" (granted a new flag)
  - 1st Supply Unit, in Alessandria
  - 1st Mixed Auto Unit, in Turin -> 1st Mixed Maneuver Auto Unit
  - 1st Army Repairs Workshop Type B, in Turin
  - 3rd Army Repairs Workshop Type A, in Milan
  - 1st Provisions Supply Company, in Turin
  - 1st Medical Company, in Milan
  - Main Military Hospital, in Milan
  - Military Hospital Type A, in Turin
  - Military Hospital Type B, in Genoa
  - Military Hospital Type B, in Brescia

=== Northeastern Military Region - V C.M.T. ===
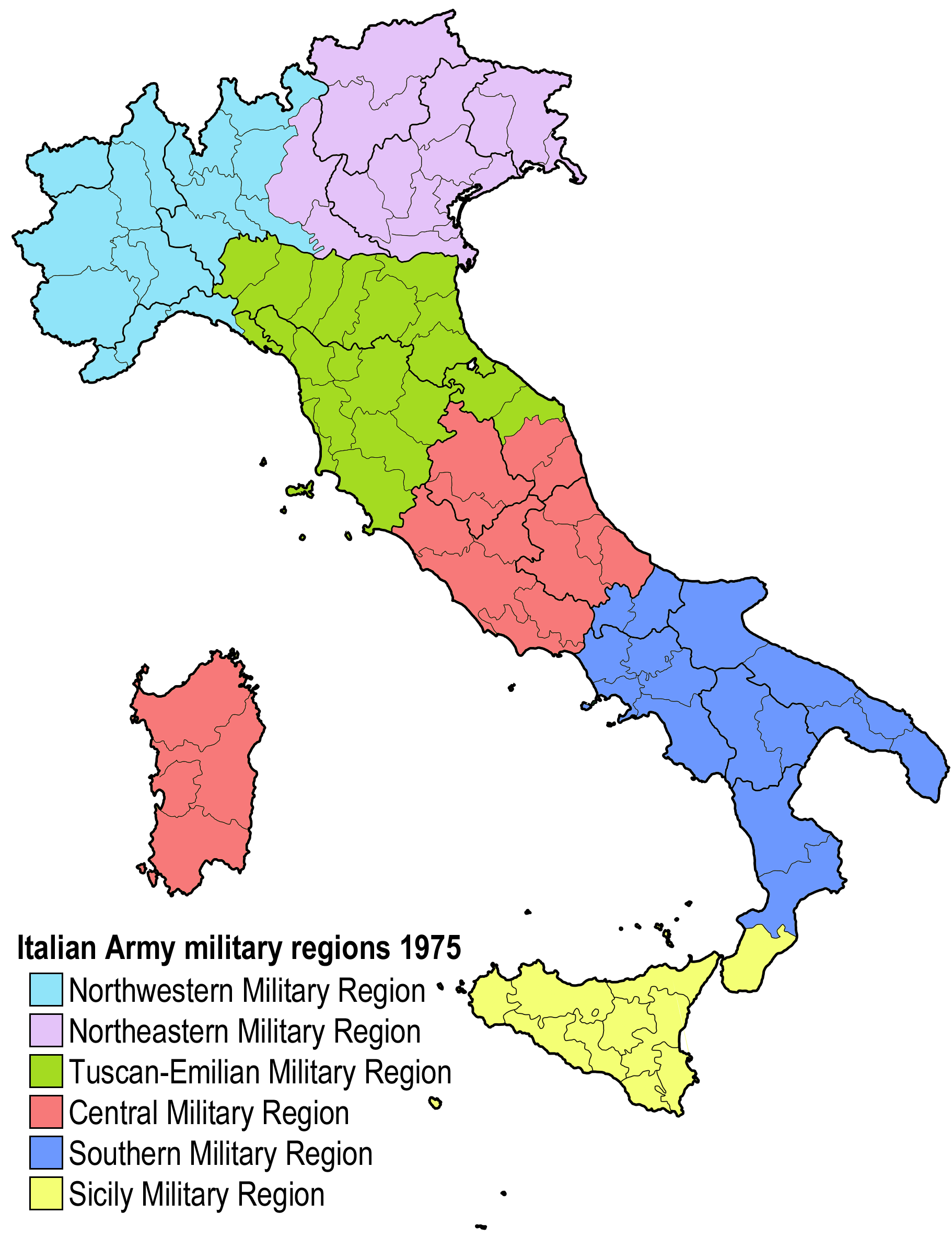
Italian Army military regions 1975

- Northeastern Military Region - V C.M.T., in Padua (Regione Militare Nord Est (R.M.N.E.): Friuli-Venezia Giulia, Trentino-Alto Adige, and Veneto regions and the two Lombardy provinces Brescia and Mantova)
  - new: R.M.N.E. Command Unit, in Padua
  - XXXI Signal Battalion, in Padua -> disbanded
  - XXXII Signal Battalion, in Padua -> 32nd Signal Battalion "Valles" (granted a new flag) --> 5th Army Corps
  - XLII Signal Battalion, in Padua -> 42nd Signal Battalion "Pordoi" (granted a new flag)
  - Mixed Electronic Warfare Company, in Conegliano -> 33rd Electronic Warfare Battalion "Falzarego" (granted a new flag); 1 March 1979: --> 5th Army Corps
  - 4th Supply Unit, in Verona
  - 5th Supply Unit, in Mestre
  - 4th Repairs Workshop Type A, in Verona
  - 5th Repairs Workshop Type A, in Dosson
  - 15th Repairs Workshop Type A, in Padua
  - 4th Provisions Supply Company, in Verona
  - 5th Provisions Supply Company, in Padua
  - 4th Medical Company, in Verona
  - 5th Medical Company, in Udine
  - Military Hospital Type A, in Verona
  - Military Hospital Type A, in Padua
  - Military Hospital Type A, in Udine
  - Military Hospital Type B, in Bolzano

=== Tuscan-Emilian Military Region - VII C.M.T. ===
- Tuscan-Emilian Military Region - VII C.M.T., in Florence (Regione Militare Tosco-Emiliana (R.M.T.E.): Emilia-Romagna and Tuscany regions, the Liguria province La Spezia, and the two Marche provinces Ancona and Pesaro-Urbino)
  - new: R.M.T.E. Command Unit, in Florence
  - 28th Infantry Regiment "Pavia" (CAR), in Pesaro -> disbanded
    - Command and Services Company, in Pesaro -> disbanded
    - I Battalion, in Pesaro -> 28th Infantry Battalion "Pavia" (Recruits Training) (assigned the flag of the 28th Infantry Regiment "Pavia") --> Mechanized Division "Folgore"
    - II Battalion, in Fano -> disbanded
    - III Battalion, in Falconara Marittima -> disbanded
  - 84th Infantry Regiment "Venezia" (CAR), in Siena -> disbanded
    - Command and Services Company, in Siena -> disbanded
    - I Battalion, in Siena -> 84th Infantry Battalion "Venezia" (Recruits Training) (assigned the flag of the 84th Infantry Regiment "Venezia") --> Central Military Region; in 1977: ʘ-> Falconara Marittima
    - II Battalion, in Pistoia -> disbanded
    - III Battalion, in Arezzo -> 225th Infantry Battalion "Arezzo" (Recruits Training) (assigned the flag of the 225th Infantry Regiment "Arezzo") --> Motorized Brigade "Friuli"
  - 3rd Heavy Field Artillery Regiment, in Pisa -> disbanded, flag and traditions transferred to the 4th Artillery Specialists Group "Bondone"
    - Command and Services Battery, in Pisa -> disbanded
    - I 155/23 Howitzers Group, in Lucca (M114 155 mm towed howitzers) -> disbanded
    - II 155/23 Howitzers Group, in Pisa (M114 155 mm towed howitzers) -> disbanded
    - III 155/23 Howitzers Group (Reserve), in Lucca (M114 155 mm towed howitzers) -> disbanded
    - IV 155/23 Howitzers Group, in Pisa (M114 155 mm towed howitzers) -> disbanded
    - 3rd Artillery Specialists Battery, in Pisa -> disbanded
  - 8th Heavy Field Artillery Regiment, in Modena (flag of the 8th Army Corps Artillery Regiment)
    - Command and Services Battery, in Modena
    - I 155/45 Cannons Group, in Modena (M59 155 mm towed howitzers) -> IV 155/45 Cannons Group / 8th Heavy Field Artillery Regiment
    - II 155/23 Howitzers Group, in Ferrara (M114 155 mm towed howitzers)
    - III 155/23 Howitzers Group (Reserve), in Modena (M114 155 mm towed howitzers)
    - IV 155/23 Howitzers Group, in Piacenza (M114 155 mm towed howitzers) (former II 155/23 Howitzers Group / 6th Heavy Field Artillery Regiment, transferred in 1974) -> I 155/23 Howitzers Group / 8th Heavy Field Artillery Regiment
    - V 155/45 Cannons Group (Reserve), in Piacenza (M59 155 mm towed howitzers) (former I 155/23 Howitzers Group / 6th Heavy Field Artillery Regiment, transferred and switched to M59 155 mm towed howitzers in 1974)
    - 8th Artillery Specialists Battery, in Modena -> disbanded
  - 2nd Pontieri Engineer Regiment, in Piacenza --> Engineering Inspectorate
    - Command and Services Company, in Piacenza -> Command and Services Platoon
    - I Pontieri Battalion (Reserve), in Piacenza -> II Pontieri Engineer Battalion (Reserve)
    - II Pontieri Battalion, in Legnago -> I Pontieri Engineer Battalion
    - III Pontieri Battalion, in Piacenza
  - Ferrovieri Engineer Regiment, in Castel Maggiore --> Engineering Inspectorate
    - Command and Services Company, in Castel Maggiore -> Command and Services Platoon
    - I Ferrovieri Battalion (Metal Bridges), in Castel Maggiore
    - II Ferrovieri Battalion (Operations), in Turin (operated the Chivasso–Ivrea–Aosta railway)
    - VI Army Corps Engineer Battalion, in Bologna -> disbanded
  - XLIII Signal Battalion, in Florence -> 43rd Signal Battalion "Abetone" (granted a new flag)
  - 7th Supply Unit, in Sesto Fiorentino
  - 7th Mixed Auto Unit, in Coverciano -> 7th Mixed Maneuver Auto Unit
  - 2nd Light Army Aviation Repairs Unit, at Borgo Panigale Airport --> Army Logistic Inspectorate
  - 6th Army Repairs Workshop Type B, in Bologna
  - 7th Army Repairs Workshop Type A, in Coverciano
  - 7th Provisions Supply Company, in Florence
  - 7th Medical Company, in Florence
  - Military Hospital Type A, in Bologna
  - Military Hospital Type A, in Florence
  - Military Hospital Type B, in Livorno
  - Military Hospital Type B, in Piacenza

==== Infantry Brigade "Trieste" ====
- Infantry Brigade "Trieste", in Bologna -> Mechanized Brigade "Trieste" --> Mechanized Division "Folgore"
  - 40th Infantry Regiment "Bologna", in Bologna -> disbanded
    - Command and Services Company, in Bologna -> Command and Signal Unit "Trieste"
    - I Infantry Battalion, in Bologna -> 40th Mechanized Infantry Battalion "Bologna" (assigned the flag of the 40th Infantry Regiment "Bologna")
    - II Infantry Battalion, in Forlì -> 66th Mechanized Infantry Battalion "Valtellina" (assigned the flag of the 66th Infantry Regiment "Valtellina")
    - III Infantry Battalion, in Bologna -> 37th Mechanized Infantry Battalion "Ravenna" (assigned the flag of the 37th Infantry Regiment "Ravenna")
    - Regimental Anti-tank Company, in Bologna (anti-tank guided missiles and M47 tanks) -> Anti-tank Company "Trieste"
  - XI Armored Battalion, in Ozzano dell'Emilia (M47 Patton tanks and M113 APCs) -> 11th Tank Battalion "M.O. Calzecchi" (granted a new flag); in 1977: -> Leopard 1A2 main battle tanks
  - Field Artillery Group "Trieste", in Bologna (M101 105 mm towed howitzers) -> 21st Field Artillery Group "Romagna" (assigned the flag of the 21st Artillery Regiment "Trieste") -> M114 155 mm towed howitzers
  - Light Aviation Unit "Trieste", at Borgo Panigale Airport (L-21B Super Cup) -> 271st Light Airplanes Squadron / 27th Light Airplanes and Helicopters Squadrons Group "Mercurio" / Tuscan-Emilian Military Region
  - Engineer Company "Trieste", in Bologna
  - Signal Company "Trieste", in Bologna --> Command and Signal Unit "Trieste"
  - Supply, Repairs, Recovery Unit "Trieste", in Budrio -> Logistic Battalion "Trieste" (granted a new flag)
  - Auto Unit "Trieste", in Budrio --> Logistic Battalion "Trieste"

==== Infantry Brigade "Friuli" ====
- Infantry Brigade "Friuli", in Florence -> Motorized Brigade "Friuli"
  - 78th Infantry Regiment "Lupi di Toscana", in Scandicci -> disbanded
    - Command and Services Company, in Scandicci -> Command and Signal Unit "Friuli"
    - I Infantry Battalion, in Scandicci -> 78th Motorized Infantry Battalion "Lupi di Toscana" (assigned the flag of the 78th Infantry Regiment "Lupi di Toscana")
    - II Infantry Battalion, in Pistoia -> 87th Motorized Infantry Battalion "Senio" (assigned the flag of the 87th Infantry Regiment "Friuli")
    - III Infantry Battalion, in Scandicci -> disbanded and equipment stored (In case of war would have been activated as 35th Motorized Infantry Battalion "Pistoia" and would have been assigned the flag of the 35th Infantry Regiment "Pistoia")
    - Regimental Anti-tank Company, in Scandicci (anti-tank guided missiles and M47 tanks) -> Anti-tank Company "Friuli"
  - XIX Armored Battalion, in Florence (M47 Patton tanks and M113 APCs) -> 19th Armored Battalion "M.O. Tumiati" (granted a new flag)
  - Field Artillery Group "Friuli", in Pistoia (M101 105 mm towed howitzers) -> 35th Field Artillery Group "Riolo" (assigned the flag of the 35th Artillery Regiment "Friuli") -> M114 155 mm towed howitzers
  - Light Aviation Unit "Friuli", at Peretola Airport (L-21B Super Cup) -> 27th Light Airplanes and Helicopters Squadrons Group "Mercurio" --> Tuscan-Emilian Military Region
  - Engineer Company "Friuli", in Florence
  - Signal Company "Friuli", in Florence --> Command and Signal Unit "Friuli"
  - Supply, Repairs, Recovery Unit "Friuli", in Coverciano -> Logistic Battalion "Friuli" (granted a new flag)
  - Auto Unit "Friuli", in Coverciano --> Logistic Battalion "Friuli"

==== Paratroopers Brigade "Folgore" ====
- Paratroopers Brigade "Folgore", in Livorno
  - 1st Paratroopers Regiment, in Livorno -> disbanded
    - Command and Services Company, in Livorno -> Paratroopers Command and Signal Unit "Folgore"
    - II Paratroopers Battalion, in Pisa -> 2nd Paratroopers Battalion "Tarquinia" (assigned the flag of the 187th Paratroopers Regiment "Folgore") ʘ-> Livorno
    - V Paratroopers Battalion, in Pisa -> 5th Paratroopers Battalion "El Alamein" (assigned the flag of the 186th Paratroopers Regiment "Folgore") ʘ-> Livorno
    - 120mm Mortar Company, in Livorno -> disbanded
  - Saboteur Paratroopers Battalion, in Pisa -> 9th Paratroopers Assault Battalion "Col Moschin" (assigned the flag of the 10th Arditi Regiment)
  - Carabinieri Paratroopers Battalion, in Livorno -> 1st Carabinieri Paratroopers Battalion "Tuscania" (granted a new flag)
  - Paratroopers Field Artillery Group, in Livorno (M56 105 mm towed howitzers) -> 185th Paratroopers Field Artillery Group "Viterbo" (assigned the flag of the 185th Artillery Regiment "Folgore")
  - Light Aviation Unit "Folgore", at Pisa-San Giusto Air Base -> 26th Light Airplanes and Helicopters Squadrons Group "Giove"
  - Paratroopers Pathfinder Company "Folgore", in Siena
  - Paratroopers Engineer Company "Folgore", in Livorno ʘ-> Lucca
  - Paratroopers Signal Company "Folgore", in Livorno --> Paratroopers Command and Signal Unit "Folgore"
  - Air-supplies Company "Folgore", in Pisa -> Paratroopers Logistic Battalion "Folgore" (granted a new flag)
  - Maintenance Company "Folgore", in Livorno --> Paratroopers Logistic Battalion "Folgore"
  - new: Paratroopers Anti-tank Company "Folgore", in Livorno

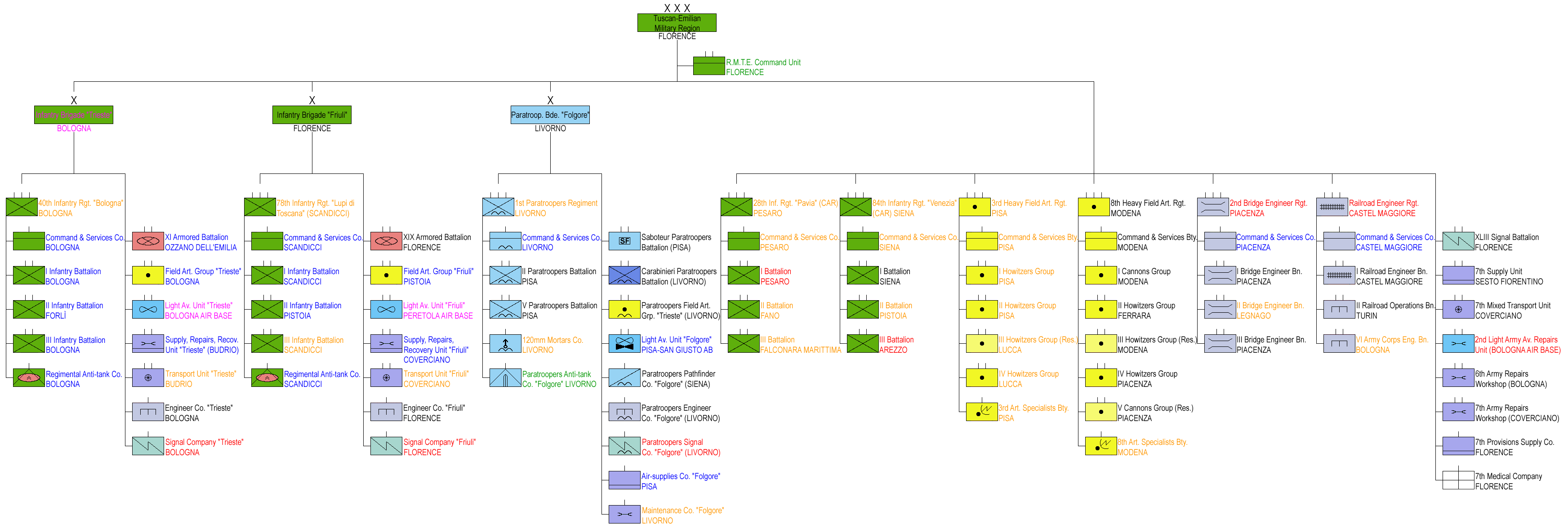
Tuscan-Emilian Military Region 1975 reform changes

=== Central Military Region - VIII C.M.T. ===
- Central Military Region - VIII C.M.T., in Rome (Regione Militare Centrale (R.M.C.): Abruzzo, Lazio, Marche (minus Ancona and Pesaro provinces) Sardinia, and Umbria regions)
  - new: R.M.C. Command Unit, in Rome
  - 80th Infantry Regiment "Roma" (CAR), in Orvieto -> disbanded
    - Command and Services Company, in Orvieto -> disbanded
    - I Battalion, in Sora -> 57th Motorized Infantry Battalion "Abruzzi" (assigned the flag of the 57th Infantry Regiment "Abruzzi") --> Motorized Brigade "Acqui"
    - II Battalion, in Orvieto -> 3rd Granatieri Battalion "Guardie" (Recruits Training) (assigned the flag of the 3rd Regiment "Granatieri di Sardegna") --> Mechanized Brigade "Granatieri di Sardegna"
    - III Battalion, in Cassino -> 80th Infantry Battalion "Roma" (Recruits Training) (assigned the flag of the 80th Infantry Regiment "Roma")
  - Regiment "Lancieri di Montebello" (8th), in Rome -> disbanded
    - Command and Services Squadron, in Rome -> disbanded
    - I Squadrons Group, in Rome (M47 Patton tanks and M113 APCs) -> 8th Armored Squadrons Group "Lancieri di Montebello" (assigned the flag of the Regiment "Lancieri di Montebello" (8th))
    - II Squadrons Group, in Rome (M47 Patton tanks and M113 APCs) -> disbanded
    - III Squadrons Group, in Rome (M47 Patton tanks and M113 APCs) -> disbanded
  - Recruits Training Battalion "Chieti", in Chieti -> Detachment 235th Infantry Battalion "Piceno" (Recruits Training); in 1985 -> 123rd Infantry Battalion "Chieti" (Recruits Training) (assigned the flag of the 123rd Infantry Regiment "Chieti")
  - XLIV Signal Battalion, in Rome -> 44th Signal Battalion "Penne" (granted a new flag)
  - 8th Supply Unit, in Rome
  - 8th Mixed Auto Unit, in Rome -> 8th Mixed Maneuver Auto Unit
  - 1st Light Army Aviation Repairs Unit, at Bracciano Airport --> Army Logistic Inspectorate
  - 8th Army Repairs Workshop Type A, in Rome
  - 8th Provisions Supply Company, in Rome
  - 8th Medical Company, in Rome
  - Main Military Hospital, in Rome
  - Military Hospital Type B, in Chieti
  - Military Hospital Type B, in Perugia
  - Military Hospital Type B, in Anzio

==== Infantry Division "Granatieri di Sardegna" ====
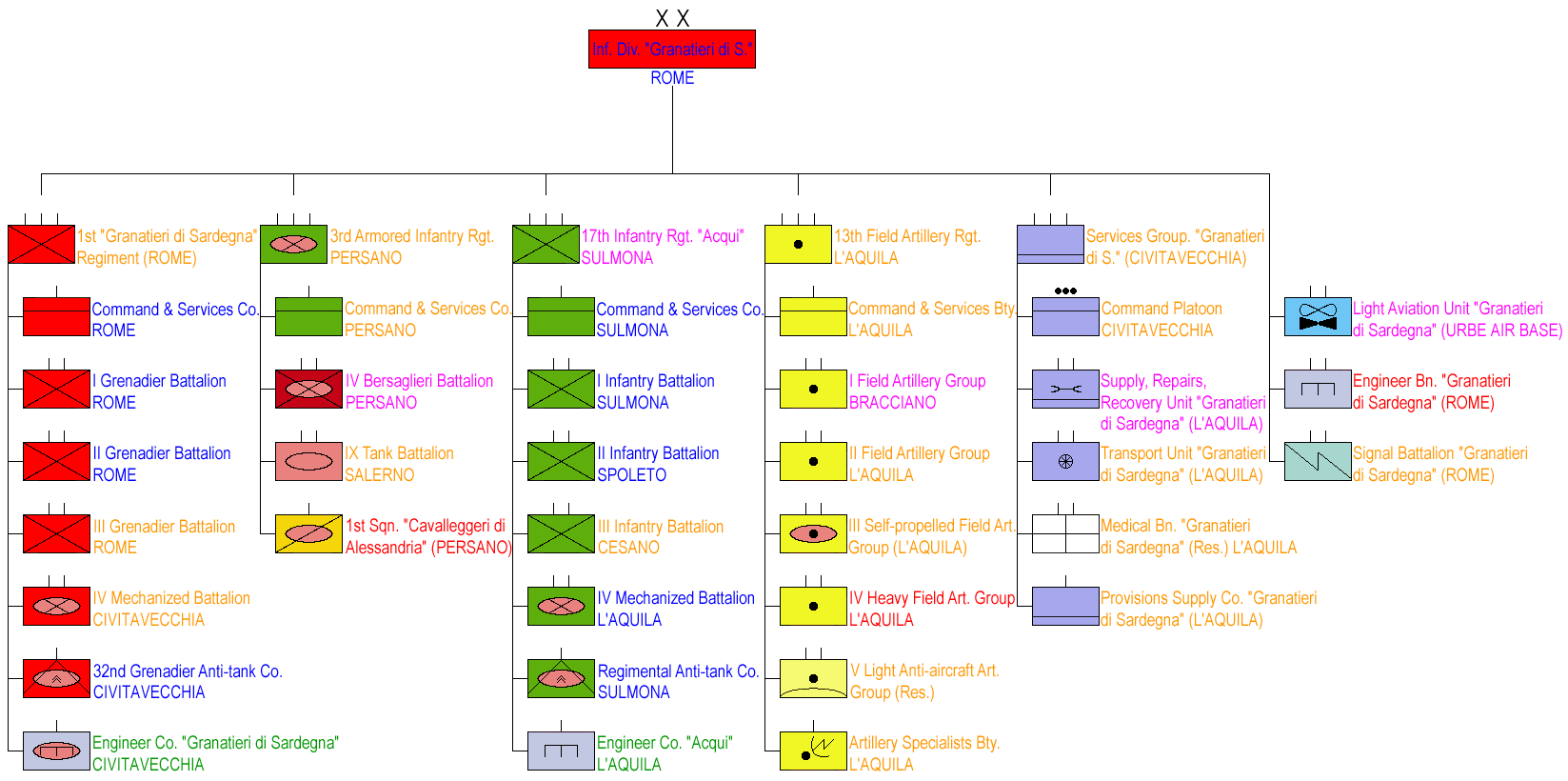
Divisione Fanteria "Granatieri di Sardegna" 1975 reform changes

- Infantry Division "Granatieri di Sardegna", in Rome -> Mechanized Brigade "Granatieri di Sardegna"
  - 1st Regiment "Granatieri di Sardegna", in Rome -> disbanded
    - Command and Services Company, in Rome -> Command and Signal Unit "Granatieri di Sardegna"
    - I Granatieri Battalion, in Rome -> 1st Mechanized Granatieri Battalion "Assietta" (assigned the flag of the 1st Regiment "Granatieri di Sardegna")
    - II Granatieri Battalion, in Rome -> 2nd Mechanized Granatieri Battalion "Cengio" (assigned the flag of the 2nd Regiment "Granatieri di Sardegna")
    - III Granatieri Battalion, in Rome -> disbanded
    - IV Mechanized Battalion, in Civitavecchia (M113 armored personnel carriers and M47 tanks) -> disbanded
    - 32nd Granatieri Anti-tank Company, in Civitavecchia (anti-tank guided missiles and M47 tanks)
  - 3rd Armored Infantry Regiment, in Persano -> disbanded, flag and traditions transferred to the IV Mechanized Battalion of the 17th Infantry Regiment "Acqui"
    - Command and Services Company, in Persano (includes an anti-tank guided missile platoon) -> disbanded
    - IV Bersaglieri Battalion, in Persano (M113 APCs) -> 67th Bersaglieri Battalion "Fagare" (assigned the flag of the 18th Bersaglieri Regiment) --> Motorized Brigade "Pinerolo"
    - IX Tank Battalion, in Salerno (M47 Patton tanks) -> disbanded
    - Squadron "Cavalleggeri di Alessandria", in Persano -> 14th Reconnaissance Squadron "Cavalleggeri di Alessandria" ʘ-> Civitavecchia --> Mechanized Brigade "Granatieri di Sardegna"
  - 17th Infantry Regiment "Acqui", in Sulmona -> Motorized Brigade "Acqui" ʘ-> L'Aquila
    - Command and Services Company, in Sulmona -> Command and Signal Unit "Acqui" ʘ-> L'Aquila
    - I Infantry Battalion, in Sulmona -> 17th Infantry Battalion "San Martino" (Recruits Training) (assigned the flag of the 17th Infantry Regiment "Acqui")
    - II Infantry Battalion, in Spoleto -> 130th Motorized Infantry Battalion "Perugia" (assigned the flag of the 130th Infantry Regiment "Perugia")
    - III Infantry Battalion, in Cesano -> disbanded and equipment stored (In case of war would have been activated as 70th Motorized Infantry Battalion "Ancona" and would have been assigned the flag of the 70th Infantry Regiment "Ancona")
    - IV Mechanized Battalion, in L'Aquila (M113 armored personnel carriers and M47 tanks) -> 9th Armored Battalion "M.O. Butera" (assigned the flag of the 3rd Armored Infantry Regiment)
    - Regimental Anti-tank Company, in Sulmona (anti-tank guided missiles and M47 tanks) -> Anti-tank Company "Acqui" ʘ-> L'Aquila
  - 13th Field Artillery Regiment, in L'Aquila -> disbanded, flag and traditions transferred to the II Self-propelled Field Artillery Group of the 131st Armored Artillery Regiment
    - Command and Services Battery, in L'Aquila -> disbanded
    - I Field Artillery Group, in Bracciano (M101 105 mm towed howitzers) -> 18th Field Artillery Group "Gran Sasso" (assigned the flag of the 18th Artillery Regiment "Pinerolo") --> Artillery School
    - II Field Artillery Group, in L'Aquila (M101 105 mm towed howitzers) -> disbanded
    - III Self-propelled Field Artillery Group, in L'Aquila (M7 105 mm self-propelled howitzers) -> disbanded
    - IV Heavy Field Artillery Group, in L'Aquila (M114 155 mm towed howitzers) -> 48th Field Artillery Group "Taro" (assigned the flag of the 48th Artillery Regiment "Taro") --> Motorized Brigade "Acqui"
    - V Light Anti-aircraft Artillery Group (Reserve), in (?) (Bofors 40 mm anti-aircraft guns and 12.7mm anti-aircraft machine guns) -> disbanded
    - Artillery Specialists Battery, in L'Aquila -> disbanded
  - Light Aviation Unit "Granatieri di Sardegna", at Urbe Airport (L-19E Bird Dog light aircraft and AB 206 reconnaissance helicopters) -> 28th Light Airplanes and Helicopters Squadrons Group "Tucano" --> Central Military Region
  - Engineer Battalion "Granatieri di Sardegna", in Rome -> 6th Engineer Battalion "Trasimeno" (assigned the flag of the 6th Engineer Regiment) --> Central Military Region
  - Signal Battalion "Granatieri di Sardegna", in Rome -> disbanded, 1 × company --> Command and Signal Unit "Granatieri di Sardegna" and 1 × company --> Command and Signal Unit "Acqui"
  - Services Grouping "Granatieri di Sardegna", in Civitavecchia -> disbanded
    - Command Platoon, in Civitavecchia -> disbanded
    - Supply, Repairs, Recovery Unit "Granatieri di Sardegna", in L'Aquila -> Logistic Battalion "Acqui" (granted a new flag) --> Motorized Brigade "Acqui"
    - Auto Unit "Granatieri di Sardegna", in L'Aquila -> disbanded
    - Medical Battalion "Granatieri di Sardegna", in L'Aquila -> disbanded
    - Provisions Supply Company "Granatieri di Sardegna", in L'Aquila -> disbanded

==== Sardinia Military Command ====
- Sardinia Military Command, in Cagliari (Comando Militare della Sardegna - C.M.S.: Sardinia region)
  - new: C.M.S. Command Unit, in Cagliari
  - 152nd Infantry Regiment "Sassari" (CAR), in Sassari -> disbanded
    - Command and Services Company, in Sassari -> disbanded
    - I Battalion, in Sassari -> 152nd Infantry Battalion "Sassari" (Recruits Training) (assigned the flag of the 152nd Infantry Regiment "Sassari")
    - II Battalion, in Cagliari -> 151st Infantry Battalion "Sette Comuni" (Recruits Training) (assigned the flag of the 151st Infantry Regiment "Sassari")
    - III Battalion, in Macomer -> Detachment 151st Infantry Battalion "Sette Comuni" (Recruits Training); in 1977 -> 45th Infantry Battalion "Arborea" (Recruits Training) (assigned the flag of the 45th Infantry Regiment "Reggio")
  - Armored Units Training Ground, in Teulada -> 1st Armored Infantry Regiment (assigned the flag of the 1st Tank Infantry Regiment)
    - Command and Services Company, in Teulada
    - I Armored Battalion, in Teulada -> 1st Armored Battalion
    - II Armored Battalion (Reserve), in Teulada -> 2nd Armored Battalion (Reserve)
    - Auto Unit, in Teulada -> Logistic Unit
    - Special Medium Workshop, in Teulada --> Logistic Unit
    - General Use Helicopters Section, in Teulada -> 421st Reconnaissance Helicopters Squadron / 21st Light Airplanes and Helicopters Squadrons Group "Orsa Maggiore"
    - new: 170th Self-propelled Field Artillery Group (Reserve), in Teulada
  - C.M.S. Light Aviation Unit, at Elmas Airport (L-21B Super Cup) -> 21st Light Airplanes and Helicopters Squadrons Group "Orsa Maggiore"
  - 12th Supply Unit, in Nuoro
  - 12th Mixed Auto Unit, in Cagliari -> 12th Mixed Maneuver Auto Unit
  - 12th Army Repairs Workshop Type B, in Cagliari
  - 12th Provisions Supply Company, in Cagliari
  - 12th Medical Company, in Cagliari
  - C.M.S. Signal Company, in Cagliari -> 47th Signal Company
  - Military Hospital Type B, in Cagliari

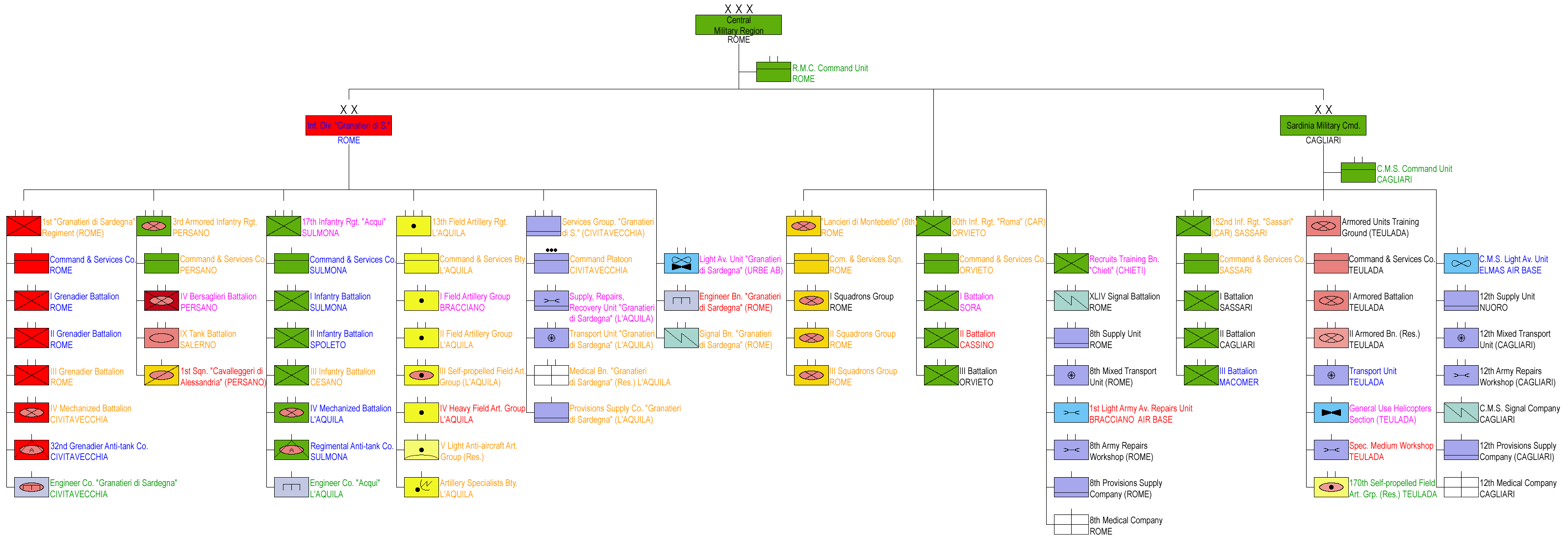
Central Military Region 1975 reform changes

=== Southern Military Region - X C.M.T. ===
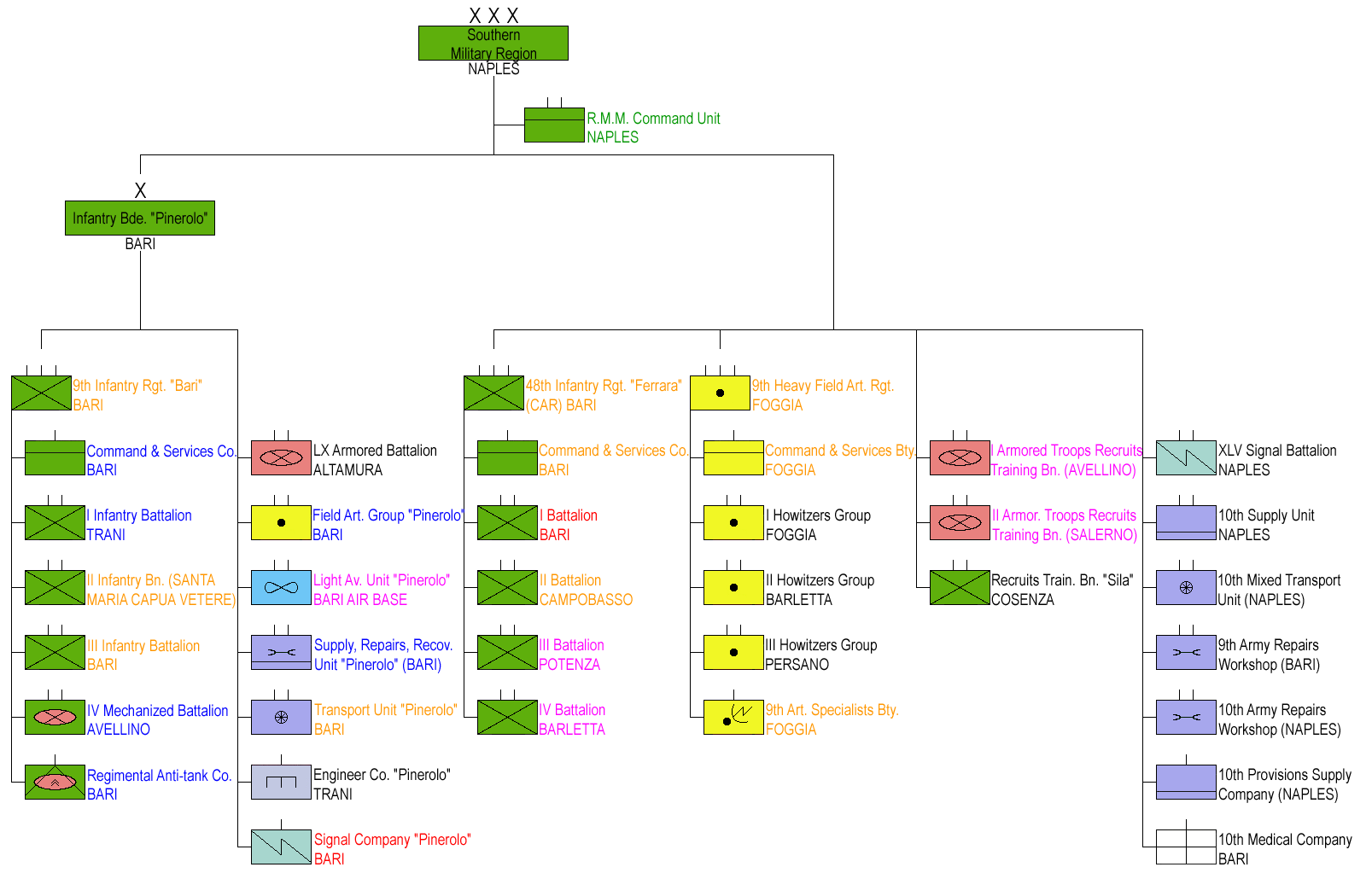
Southern Military Region 1975 reform changes

- Regione Militare Meridionale - X C.M.T., in Naples (Regione Militare Meridionale (R.M.M.): Apulia, Basilicata, Calabria (minus Reggio Calabria province), Campania and Molise regions)
  - new: R.M.M. Command Unit, in Naples
  - 48th Infantry Regiment "Ferrara" (CAR), in Bari -> disbanded
    - Command and Services Company, in Bari -> disbanded
    - I Battalion, in Bari -> 48th Infantry Battalion "Ferrara" (Recruits Training) (assigned the flag of the 48th Infantry Regiment "Ferrara") --> 5th Army Corps
    - II Battalion, in Campobasso -> disbanded
    - III Battalion, in Potenza -> Detachment 244th Infantry Battalion "Cosenza" (Recruits Training); in 1977 -> 91st Infantry Battalion "Lucania" (Recruits Training) (assigned the flag of the 91st Infantry Regiment "Basilicata")
    - IV Battalion, in Barletta -> Detachment 48th Infantry Battalion "Ferrara" (Recruits Training); in 1977 -> 47th Infantry Battalion "Salento" (Recruits Training) (assigned the flag of the 47th Infantry Regiment "Ferrara")
  - 9th Heavy Field Artillery Regiment, in Foggia -> disbanded
    - Command and Services Battery, in Foggia -> disbanded
    - I 155/23 Howitzers Group, in Foggia (M114 155 mm towed howitzers) -> 9th Heavy Field Artillery Group "Foggia" (assigned the flag of the 9th Army Corps Artillery Regiment)
    - II 155/23 Howitzers Group, in Barletta (M114 155 mm towed howitzers) -> 2nd Heavy Field Artillery Group "Potenza" (assigned the flag of the 2nd Army Corps Artillery Regiment)
    - III 155/23 Howitzers Group, in Persano (M114 155 mm towed howitzers) -> 11th Heavy Field Artillery Group "Teramo" (assigned the flag of the 11th Army Corps Artillery Regiment)
    - 9th Artillery Specialists Battery, in Foggia -> disbanded
  - I Armored Troops Recruits Training Battalion, in Avellino -> 231st Infantry Battalion "Avellino" (Recruits Training) (assigned the flag of the 231st Infantry Regiment "Avellino") --> Motorized Brigade "Pinerolo"
  - II Armored Troops Recruits Training Battalion, in Salerno -> 89th Infantry Battalion "Salerno" (Recruits Training) (assigned the flag of the 89th Infantry Regiment "Salerno") --> Signal Specialists School
  - Recruits Training Battalion "Sila", in Cosenza -> 244th Infantry Battalion "Cosenza" (Recruits Training) (assigned the flag of the 244th Infantry Regiment "Cosenza")
  - XLV Signal Battalion, in Naples -> 45th Signal Battalion "Vulture" (granted a new flag)
  - 10th Supply Unit, in Naples
  - 10th Mixed Auto Unit, in Naples -> 10th Mixed Maneuver Auto Unit
  - 9th Army Repairs Workshop Type B, in Bari
  - 10th Army Repairs Workshop Type A, in Naples
  - 10th Provisions Supply Company, in Naples
  - 10th Medical Company, in Bari
  - Military Hospital Type A, in Bari
  - Military Hospital Type A, in Caserta
  - Military Hospital Type B, in Naples
  - Military Hospital Type B, in Catanzaro

==== Infantry Brigade "Pinerolo" ====
- Infantry Brigade "Pinerolo", in Bari -> Motorized Brigade "Pinerolo"
  - 9th Infantry Regiment "Bari", in Bari -> disbanded
    - Command and Services Company, in Bari -> Command and Signal Unit "Pinerolo"
    - I Infantry Battalion, in Trani -> 9th Motorized Infantry Battalion "Bari" (assigned the flag of the 9th Infantry Regiment "Bari")
    - II Infantry Battalion, in Santa Maria Capua Vetere -> disbanded
    - III Infantry Battalion, in Bari -> disbanded
    - IV Mechanized Battalion, in Avellino -> 13th Motorized Infantry Battalion "Valbella" (assigned the flag of the 13th Infantry Regiment "Pinerolo")
    - Regimental Anti-tank Company, in Bari (anti-tank guided missiles and M47 tanks) -> Anti-tank Company "Pinerolo"
  - LX Armored Battalion, in Altamura (M47 Patton tanks and M113 APCs) -> 60th Armored Battalion "M.O. Locatelli" (granted a new flag)
  - Field Artillery Group "Pinerolo", in Bari (M101 105 mm towed howitzers) -> 47th Field Artillery Group "Gargano" (assigned the flag of the 47th Artillery Regiment "Bari") -> M114 155 mm towed howitzers
  - Light Aviation Unit "Pinerolo", at Bari Airport (L-21B Super Cup) -> 20th Light Airplanes and Helicopters Squadrons Group "Andromeda" ʘ-> Pontecagnano Airport --> Southern Military Region
  - Engineer Company "Pinerolo", in Trani
  - Signal Company "Pinerolo", in Bari --> Command and Signal Unit "Pinerolo"
  - Supply, Repairs, Recovery Unit "Pinerolo", in Bari -> Logistic Battalion "Pinerolo" (granted a new flag)
  - Auto Unit "Pinerolo", in Bari -> disbanded

=== Sicily Military Region - XI C.M.T. ===
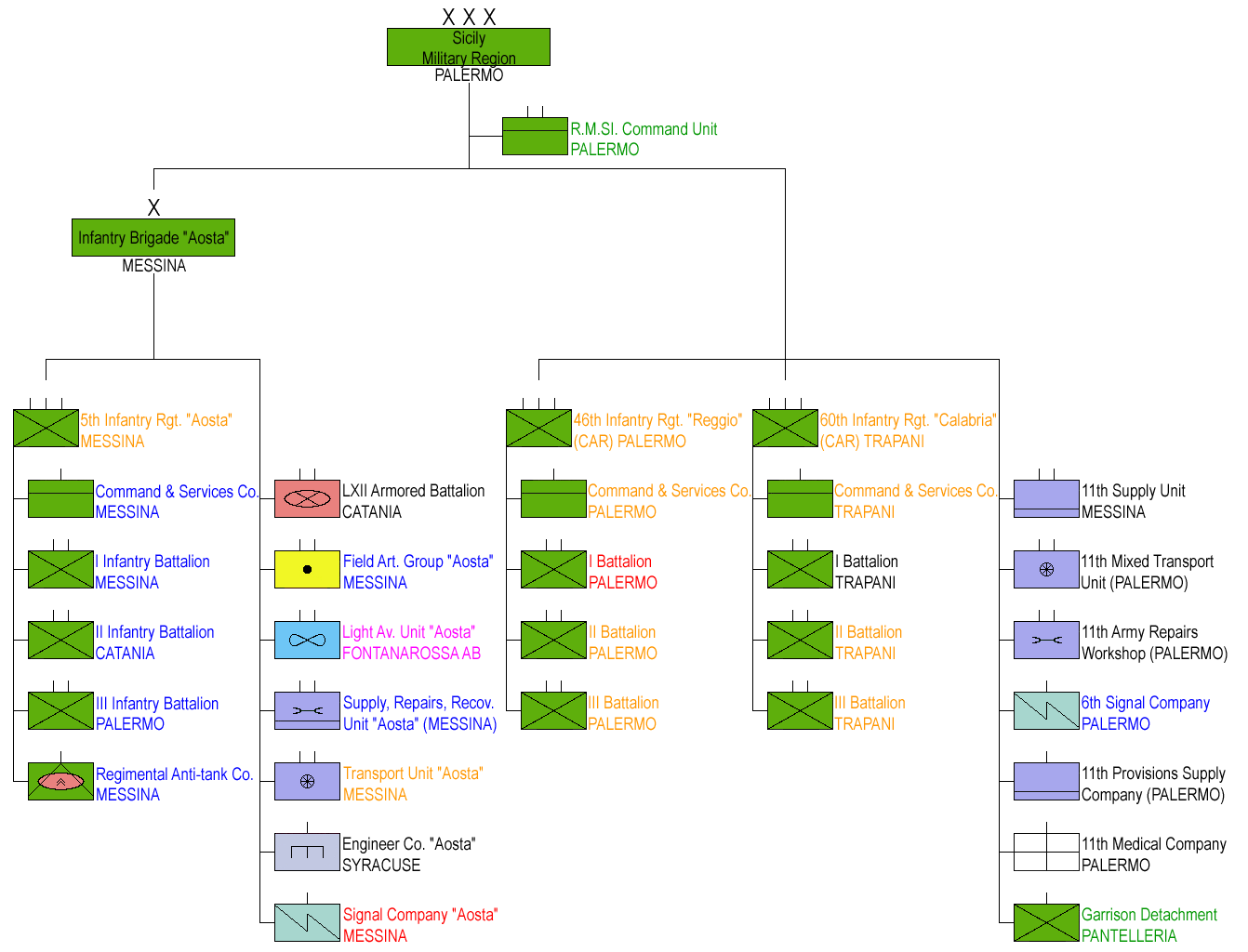
Sicily Military Region 1975 reform changes

- Sicily Military Region - XI C.M.T., in Palermo (Regione Militare della Sicilia (R.M.SI.): Sicily region and the Calabria province of Reggio Calabria)
  - new: R.M.SI. Command Unit, in Palermo
  - 46th Infantry Regiment "Reggio" (CAR), in Palermo -> disbanded
    - Command and Services Company, in Palermo -> disbanded
    - I Battalion, in Palermo -> 46th Infantry Battalion "Reggio" (Recruits Training) (assigned the flag of the 46th Infantry Regiment "Reggio") --> Motorized Brigade "Aosta"
    - II Battalion, in Palermo -> disbanded
    - III Battalion, in Palermo -> disbanded
  - 60th Infantry Regiment "Calabria" (CAR), in Trapani -> disbanded
    - Command and Services Company, in Trapani -> disbanded
    - I Battalion, in Trapani -> 60th Infantry Battalion "Col di Lana" (Recruits Training) (assigned the flag of the 60th Infantry Regiment "Calabria")
    - II Battalion, in Trapani -> disbanded
    - III Battalion, in Trapani -> disbanded
  - 6th Signal Company, in Palermo -> 4 November 1975: 46th Signal Company -> 1 May 1976: 46th Signal Battalion "Mongibello" (granted a new flag)
  - 11th Supply Unit, in Messina
  - 11th Mixed Auto Unit, in Palermo -> 11th Mixed Maneuver Auto Unit
  - 11th Army Repairs Workshop Type B, in Palermo
  - 11th Provisions Supply Company, in Palermo
  - 11th Medical Company, in Palermo
  - Military Hospital Type B, in Palermo
  - Military Hospital Type B, in Messina
  - new: Garrison Detachment, on Pantelleria island

==== Infantry Brigade "Aosta" ====
- Infantry Brigade "Aosta", in Messina -> Motorized Brigade "Aosta"
  - 5th Infantry Regiment "Aosta", in Messina -> disbanded
    - Command and Services Company, in Messina -> Command and Signal Unit "Aosta"
    - I Infantry Battalion, in Messina -> 5th Motorized Infantry Battalion "Col della Beretta" (assigned the flag of the 5th Infantry Regiment "Aosta")
    - II Infantry Battalion, in Catania -> 62nd Motorized Infantry Battalion "Sicilia" (assigned the flag of the 62nd Infantry Regiment "Sicilia")
    - III Infantry Battalion, in Palermo -> 141st Motorized Infantry Battalion "Catanzaro" (assigned the flag of the 141st Infantry Regiment "Catanzaro")
    - Regimental Anti-tank Company, in Messina (anti-tank guided missiles and M47 tanks) -> Anti-tank Company "Aosta"
  - LXII Armored Battalion, in Catania (M47 Patton tanks and M113 APCs) -> 62nd Armored Battalion "M.O. Jero" (granted a new flag)
  - Field Artillery Group "Aosta", in Messina (M101 105 mm towed howitzers) -> 24th Field Artillery Group "Peloritani" (assigned the flag of the 24th Artillery Regiment "Piemonte") -> M114 155 mm towed howitzers
  - Light Aviation Unit "Aosta", at Fontanarossa Airport (L-21B Super Cup) -> 30th Light Airplanes and Helicopters Squadrons Group "Pegaso" --> Sicily Military Region
  - Engineer Company "Aosta", in Syracuse
  - Signal Company "Aosta", in Messina --> Command and Signal Unit "Aosta"
  - Supply, Repairs, Recovery Unit "Aosta", in Messina -> Logistic Battalion "Aosta" (granted a new flag)
  - Auto Unit "Aosta", in Messina -> disbanded

=== Anti-aircraft Artillery Command ===
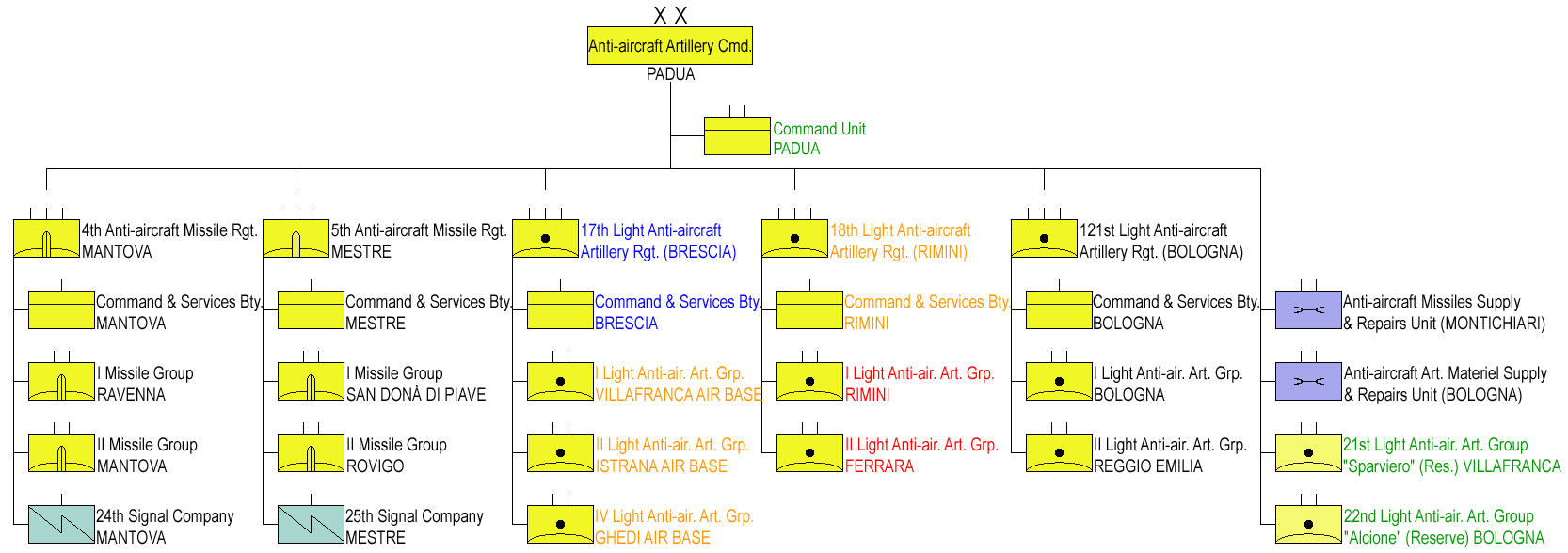
Anti-aircraft Artillery Command 1975 reform changes

In peacetime the Anti-aircraft Artillery Command was under administrative control of the Artillery Inspectorate in Rome, in wartime it would have come under operational control of NATO's Allied Land Forces Southern Europe Command in Verona.

- Anti-aircraft Artillery Command, in Padua
  - new: Command Unit, in Padua
  - 4th Anti-aircraft Missile Artillery Regiment, in Mantua
    - Command and Services Battery, in Mantua
    - I Missile Group, in Ravenna (MIM-23 Hawk anti-aircraft missile systems)
    - II Missile Group, in Mantua (MIM-23 Hawk anti-aircraft missile systems)
    - 24th Signal Company, in Mantua
  - 5th Anti-aircraft Missile Artillery Regiment, in Mestre
    - Command and Services Battery, in Mestre
    - I Missile Group, in San Donà di Piave (MIM-23 Hawk anti-aircraft missile systems)
    - II Missile Group, in Rovigo (MIM-23 Hawk anti-aircraft missile systems)
    - 25th Signal Company, in Mestre
  - 17th Light Anti-aircraft Artillery Regiment, in Brescia -> 17th Light Anti-aircraft Artillery Group "Sforzesca" (assigned the flag of the 17th Artillery Regiment "Sforzesca") ʘ-> Villafranca
    - Command and Services Battery, in Brescia -> Command Battery ʘ-> Villafranca
    - I Light Anti-aircraft Artillery Group, at Villafranca Air Base (L/70 40 mm anti-aircraft cannons) -> 1st Light Anti-aircraft Artillery Battery / 17th Light Anti-aircraft Artillery Group "Sforzesca"
    - II Light Anti-aircraft Artillery Group, at Istrana Air Base (L/70 40 mm anti-aircraft cannons) -> 3rd Light Anti-aircraft Artillery Battery / 17th Light Anti-aircraft Artillery Group "Sforzesca"
    - IV Light Anti-aircraft Artillery Group, at Ghedi Air Base (L/70 40 mm anti-aircraft cannons) -> 2nd Light Anti-aircraft Artillery Battery / 17th Light Anti-aircraft Artillery Group "Sforzesca"
  - 18th Light Anti-aircraft Artillery Regiment, in Rimini -> disbanded, flag and traditions transferred to the I Field Artillery Group of the 13th Field Artillery Regiment
    - Command and Services Battery, in Rimini -> disbanded
    - I Light Anti-aircraft Artillery Group, in Rimini (L/70 40 mm anti-aircraft cannons) -> III Light Anti-aircraft Artillery Group --> 121st Light Anti-aircraft Artillery Regiment "
    - II Light Anti-aircraft Artillery Group, in Ferrara (L/70 40mm anti-aircraft cannons) -> IV Light Anti-aircraft Artillery Group --> 121st Light Anti-aircraft Artillery Regiment
  - 121st Light Anti-aircraft Artillery Regiment, in Bologna
    - Command and Services Battery, in Bologna
    - I Light Anti-aircraft Artillery Group, in Bologna (L/70 40mm anti-aircraft cannons)
    - II Light Anti-aircraft Artillery Group, in Reggio Emilia (L/70 40mm anti-aircraft cannons) ʘ-> Mestre on 10 March 1977
  - new: 21st Light Anti-aircraft Artillery Group "Sparviero" (Reserve), in Villafranca (equipment of the disbanded groups of the 17th Light Anti-aircraft Artillery Regiment)
  - new: 22nd Light Anti-aircraft Artillery Group "Alcione" (Reserve), in Bologna (equipment of the disbanded groups of the 17th Light Anti-aircraft Artillery Regiment)
  - Anti-aircraft Missiles Supply and Repairs Unit, in Montichiari
  - Anti-aircraft Artillery Materiel Supply and Repairs Unit, in Bologna

== Sources ==
L'Esercito Italiano verso il 2000, a 6-tome book published by the Ufficio Storico (History Office) of the Italian army's General Staff is the main source for this article. The book contains the official history of every Italian army unit that was granted a flag. The other main sources of this article are the presidential decrees from 12 November 1976, n. 846 and 14 March 1977, n. 173, with which the President of the Italian Republic awarded the units created in the 1975 reform their flags and names. The third main source is the Circolare SME n. 350/151 del 4.8.1975 with which the Army General Staff informed all units of the changes affecting them during the reform.
