= Punta Tagliamento Lighthouse =

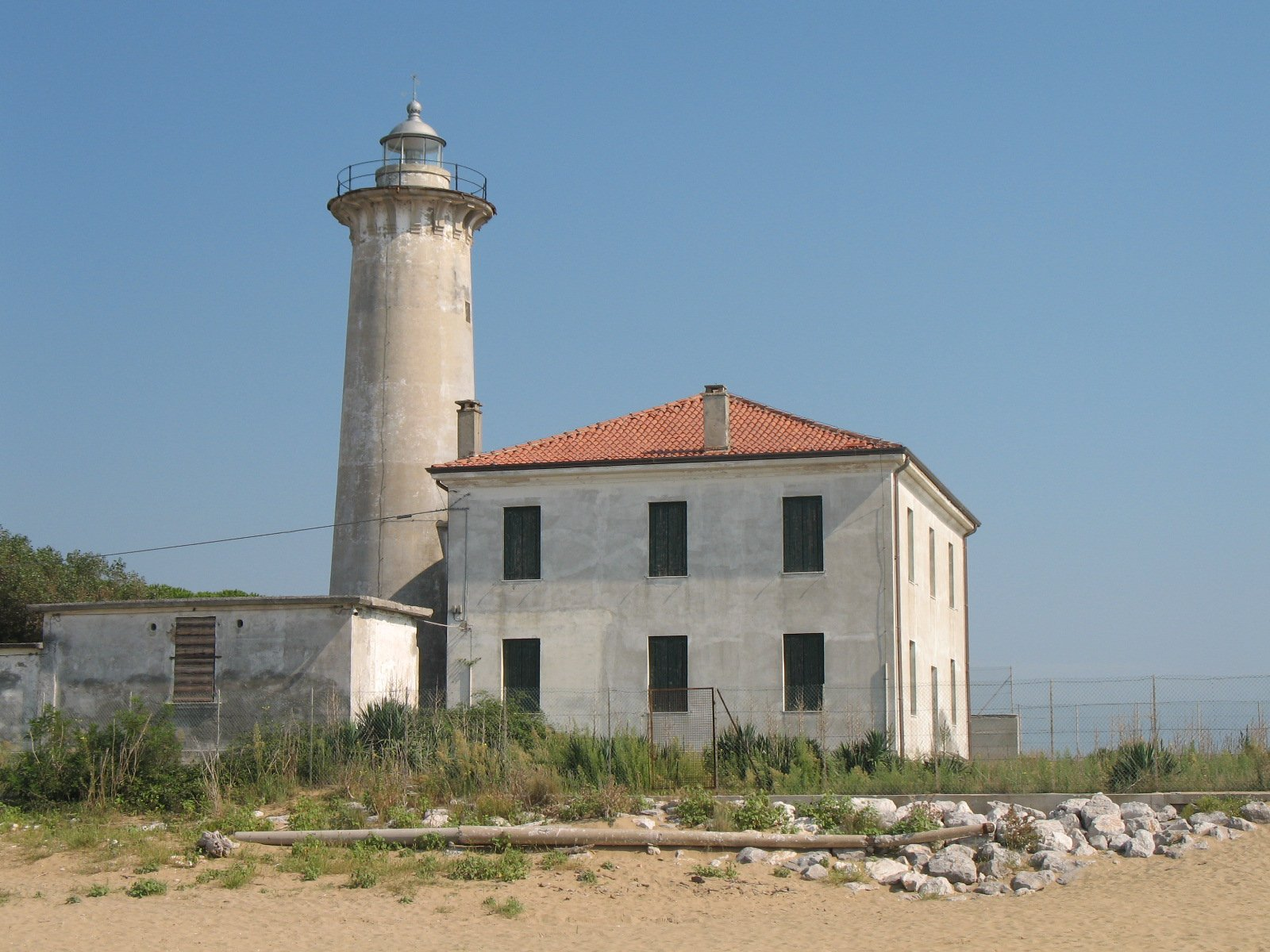
- Location: Bibione, San Michele al Tagliamento, Veneto, Italy
- Coordinates: 45°38′11″N 13°05′51″E

Tower
- Constructed: 1913
- Construction: concrete
- Automated: 1973
- Height: 21 m (69 ft)
- Shape: cylindrical tower with balcony and lantern
- Markings: White
- Power source: mains electricity
- Operator: Italian Navy

Light
- Focal height: 22 m (72 ft)
- Lens: Type TD, focal length: 187.5 mm
- Intensity: main: AL 1000 w reserve: LABI 100 W
- Range: 15 nmi (28 km; 17 mi) (main light), 11 nmi (20 km; 13 mi) (auxiliary light)
- Characteristic: Fl(3) W 10s
- Italy no.: 4288 E.F.

Punta Tagliamento Lighthouse (Italian: Faro di Punta Tagliamento) is a lighthhose in Bibione a frazione of San Michele al Tagliamento, Veneto on the coast of the Adriatic Sea. It is placed on the beach protected by several seawalls placed as erosion control.

== History ==
The lighthouse was built in 1913 on the Venetian side of the mouth of the Tagliamento river, which at that time was the northern border of the Kingdom of Italy. In 1917 the light was destroyed by a bombing during World War I but it was rebuilt. In 1952 the plant was electrified and in 1973 was completely automated. The lighthouse is formed by a concrete white tower 21 metres (69 ft) high adjacent to a two-story white and ochre keeper's house completely restored in June 2015 which will be used in part to accommodate a Museum, cultural events and to celebrate marriage too. The light is active, fully automated and operated by Marina Militare identified by the code number 4288 E.F.

== See also ==
- List of lighthouses in Italy
