= 3rd Missile Brigade "Aquileia" =

- 3ª Brigata Missili "Aquileia"
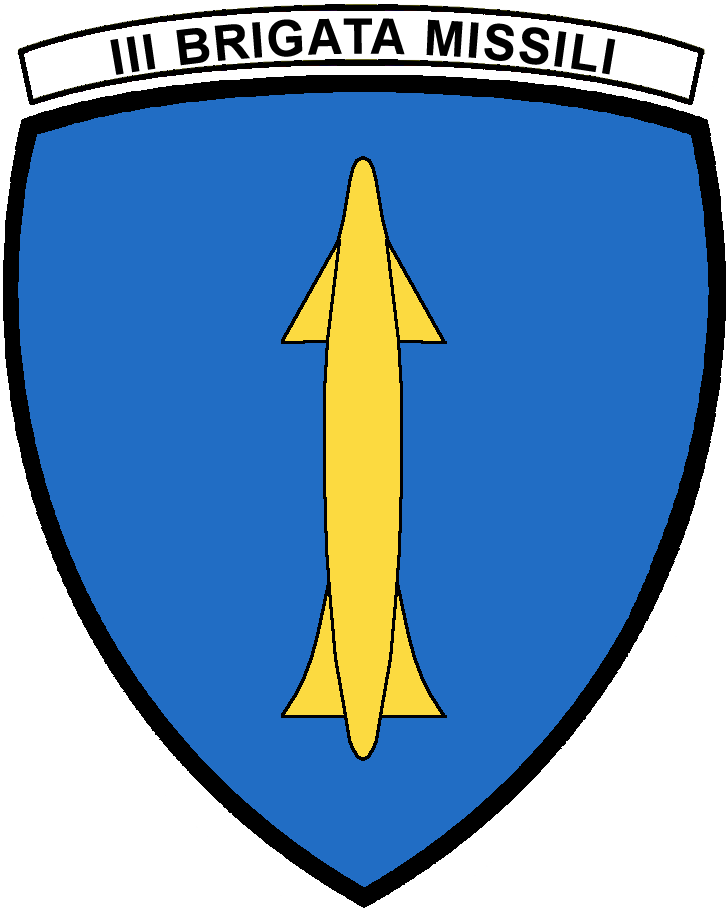
- Brigade coat of arms
- Active: 1 October 1959 – 30 November 1991
- Country: Italy
- Branch: Italian Army
- Type: Artillery
- Role: Rocket artillery
- Part of: 5th Army Corps
- Garrison/HQ: Portogruaro

The 3rd Missile Brigade "Aquileia" (Italian: 3ª Brigata Missili "Aquileia") was an artillery brigade of the Italian Army active between 1959 and 1991. The brigade was stationed in North-Eastern Italy and armed with missile and artillery systems capable of firing tactical nuclear weapons as part of Italy's participation in NATOs nuclear sharing programme. During peacetime the brigade fell under command of the Italian V Army Corps, but during wartime the brigade would have been subordinate to NATOs Allied Land Forces Southern Europe (LANDSOUTH) command in Verona. After the end of the Cold War the brigade was disbanded and its weapon systems retired.

== History ==
In the early 1950s NATO introduced tactical nuclear weapons to counter the Warsaw Pact superiority in conventional weapon systems. On 20 October 1954 Italy and the US signed a series of secret agreements regulating the nuclear defence of Italy:

- the Atomic Stockpile Agreement discussing the introduction and storage within Italy, custody, security, safety and release of weapons, as well as cost sharing.
- the Atomic Cooperation Agreement about the "Exchange of Atomic information useful for mutual Defence Purposes".
- the Service-Level Agreement between the US and Italian militaries regarding technical details about the implementation of the government-to-government stockpile agreement, with details about where the nuclear weapons would be stored and the command structure for their use, as well as joint and individual responsibilities for their storage.

Italy and the United States of America had also signed a bilateral military agreement in 1954, which allowed the American Forces leaving Austria after the signing of the Austrian State Treaty in 1955 to use bases in Italy. At the end of 1955 10,000 US troops left Austria and joined the US Southern European Task Force (SETAF) in Italy. SETAF included two nuclear armed artillery battalions, whose equipment was handed over to the Italian Army when the SETAF was reduced in size and most of its troops returned to the continental USA.

After all the details had been worked out 44 Italian soldiers of the 3rd Heavy Artillery Regiment began their training at the US Army base of the 77th Field Artillery Battalion in Vicenza on 10 January 1959. Initially the only delivery system was the MGR-1 Honest John nuclear-capable surface-to-surface missile and on 25 February 1959 the Italians launched their first missile from the Adriatic coastal town of Bibione.

On 1 March 1959 the 3rd Heavy Artillery Regiment activated two rocket launchers groups armed with Honest John missile systems. On 1 October 1959 the regiment's names was changed to 3rd Heavy Artillery Regiment (Missile) and it became the first unit of the newly raised III Missile Brigade in Vicenza. The regiment added a third rocket launchers group on 15 November 1960 and a fourth rocket launchers group on 15 November 1962. Each group fielded four Honest John launch systems and were based in Elvas, Oderzo, Codogné and Portogruaro.

Since its inception the brigade was augmented with further units and by 1964 the brigade consisted of the following units:

- III Missile Brigade, in Vicenza
  - 3rd Missile Artillery Regiment, in Portogruaro
    - I Missile Artillery Group, in Codogné
    - II Missile Artillery Group, in Portogruaro
    - III Missile Artillery Group, in Oderzo
    - IV Missile Artillery Group, in Elvas
  - XIII Target Acquisition Group, in Verona
  - XIV Heavy Artillery Group, in Trento armed with M115 203mm howitzers
  - XV Heavy Artillery Group, in Verona armed with M115 203mm howitzers
  - XXI Engineer Battalion, in Vicenza
  - XIII Logistic Battalion, in Vicenza
  - 13th Signal Company, in Portogruaro
  - 4x infantry companies guarding the nuclear ammunition storage sites in Codogné, Portogruaro, Oderzo and Elvas

The units of the brigade were stationed in the North-east of Italy behind the defensive lines of the IV Army Corps and V Army Corps. In case the frontline corps would have failed to hold a Warsaw Pact attack, the III Missile Brigade was tasked to use its tactical nuclear weapons to destroy enemy troop concentrations and to turn the Puster, Canal and Piave valleys into nuclear wastelands to deny the enemy passage.

=== 1975 reform ===
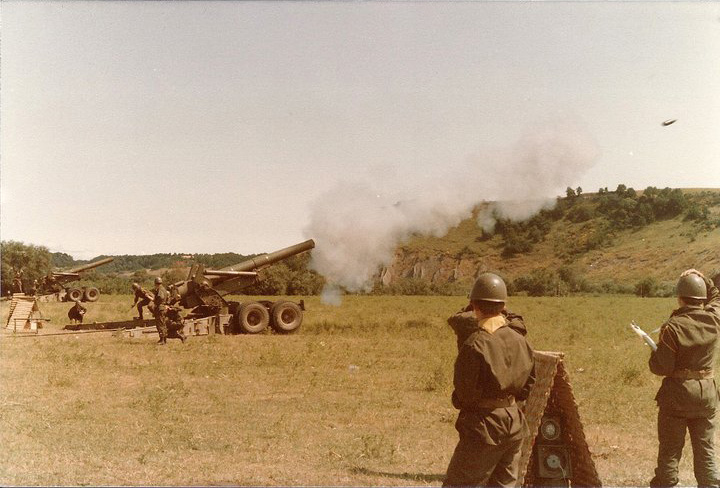
1st Heavy Artillery Group "Adige" firing its M115 203mm howitzers

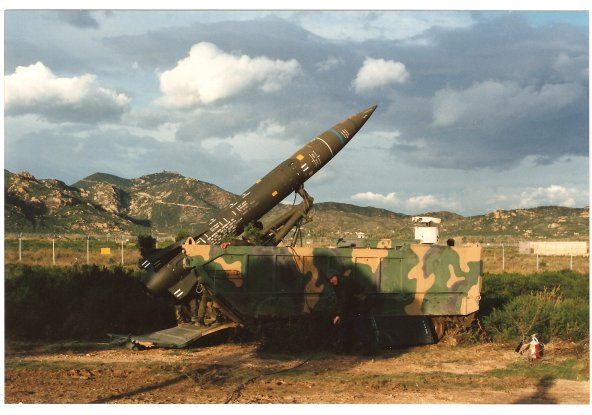
3rd Missile Artillery Group "Volturno" readying a MGM-52 Lance missile for launch

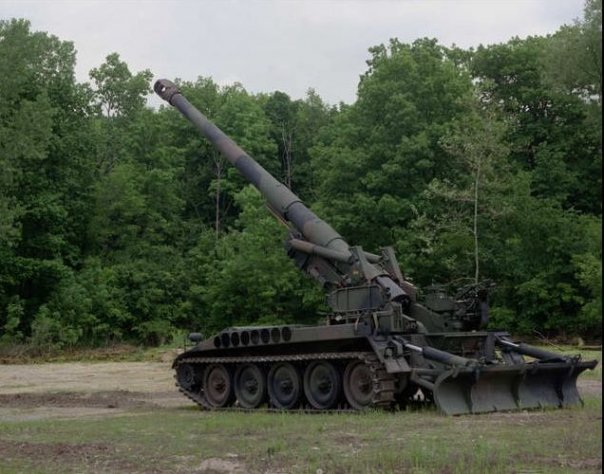
27th Heavy Artillery Group "Marche" M110A2 203mm howitzer

In summer 1973 the 3rd Missile Artillery Regiment began the transition from Honest John to the more accurate and powerful MGM-52 Lance missile system. In summer 1974 troops from the 3rd Missile Artillery Regiment visited the US Army Field Artillery School in Fort Sill in Oklahoma to train with the new missile system. The training culminated with the launch of six Lance missiles on 5 and 6 December 1974 at the White Sands Missile Range in New Mexico. After the troops' return to Italy the 3rd Missile Artillery Regiment began to phase out its Honest John systems. As the MGM-52 Lance was more accurate, far reaching and powerful than the MGR-1 Honest John the 3rd Missile Artillery Regiment was disbanded on 1 January 1975 and replaced by the 3rd Missile Artillery Group "Volturno". The Volturno fielded three missile batteries, each armed with two M-752 missile launchers.

On 27 July 1975 the 3rd Missile Artillery Group "Volturno" fired the first Lance missiles on Italian soil from the Salto di Quirra military firing range at Perdasdefogu in Sardinia. After the successful launch the group was declared operational. The same year the Italian army abolished the regimental level, moved from Roman numerals to Arabic numerals and awarded new honorific titles to units. Therefore, the brigade became the 3rd Missile Brigade "Aquileia" and its new composition at the end of 1977 was as follows:

- 3rd Missile Brigade "Aquileia" / 5th Army Corps Artillery Command, in Portogruaro
  - Command Unit "Aquileia", in Portogruaro
  - 27th Heavy Self-propelled Artillery Regiment, in Udine
    - Command and Services Battery, in Udine
    - I 175/60 Self-propelled Group, in Udine (M107 175mm self-propelled guns)
    - II 175/60 Self-propelled Group, in Udine (M107 175mm self-propelled guns)
  - 1st Heavy Artillery Group "Adige", in Elvas
    - Command and Services Battery, in Elvas
    - 7th Battery, in Elvas (M115 203mm towed howitzers, ammunition included W33 nuclear artillery shells)
    - 8th Battery, in Elvas (M115 203mm towed howitzers, ammunition included W33 nuclear artillery shells)
    - 4th Fusiliers Company, in Elvas
  - 3rd Missile Artillery Group "Volturno", in Oderzo
    - Command Battery, in Oderzo
    - 1st Missile Battery, in Oderzo (MGM-52 Lance surface-to-surface missiles, ammunition included W70 nuclear warheads)
    - 2nd Missile Battery, in Codogné (MGM-52 Lance surface-to-surface missiles, ammunition included W70 nuclear warheads)
    - 3rd Missile Battery, in Codogné (MGM-52 Lance surface-to-surface missiles, ammunition included W70 nuclear warheads)
    - 1st Fusiliers Company, in Codogné
    - 3rd Fusiliers Company, in Oderzo
    - Services Battery, in Oderzo
  - 9th Heavy Artillery Group "Rovigo", in Verona
    - Command and Services Battery, in Verona
    - 1st Battery, in Verona (M115 203mm towed howitzers, ammunition included W33 nuclear artillery shells)
    - 2nd Battery, in Verona (M115 203mm towed howitzers, ammunition included W33 nuclear artillery shells)
  - 13th Signal Battalion "Mauria", in Portogruaro
  - 21st Engineer Battalion "Timavo", in Vicenza
    - Command and Park Company, in Vicenza
    - 1st Engineer Company, in Vicenza
    - 2nd Engineer Company, in Vicenza
    - 2nd Fusiliers Company, in Vicenza
  - 41st Artillery Specialists Group "Cordenons", in Casarsa della Delizia
    - Command and Services Battery, in Casarsa della Delizia
    - 1st Target Acquisition Battery, in Casarsa della Delizia
    - 2nd Target Acquisition Battery (Reserve), in Casarsa della Delizia
    - 3rd Target Acquisition Battery (Reserve), in Casarsa della Delizia
    - Unmanned Aircraft Battery, in Casarsa della Delizia
  - 92nd Infantry Battalion "Basilicata" (Recruits Training), in Portogruaro
  - 13th Target Acquisition Group "Aquileia", in Verona
    - Command and Services Battery
    - Reconnaissance and Target Acquisition Battery
    - Unmanned Aircraft Battery (Canadair CL-89B "Midge" drones)
    - Air Component, at Boscomantico Air Base
      - 398th Light Airplanes Squadron (SM.1019A planes)
      - 598th Multirole Helicopters Squadron (AB-204B helicopters)
      - Light Airplanes Maintenance Squadron
  - XIII Resupply, Repairs, Recovery Unit, in Vicenza (reorganized on 1 January 1982 as 13th Maneuver Logistic Battalion and moved to Portogruaro)

At the time the brigade fielded around 5,500 men.

=== Strategic plans in case of war ===
After the 1975 reform the brigade's heavy artillery groups had each one valley they were tasked to defend with nuclear fire:

- the 1st Heavy Artillery Group "Adige" was to defend the Puster in case the Alpine Brigade "Tridentina" would have failed to hold it. Additionally the group would have covered the Austrian Inn and Wipp valleys in case NATO's Central Army Group in Southern Germany would have failed to keep Warsaw Pact forces from entering the two aforementioned valleys.
- the 9th Heavy Artillery Group "Rovigo" was to defend the Piave valley in case the Alpine Brigade "Cadore" would have failed to hold it. Additionally the group would have covered the Adige valley with nuclear fire if Warsaw Pact forces would have managed to reach it through the Puster or Wipp valley.
- the 27th Heavy Artillery Group "Marche" was to defend the Canal valley in case the Alpine Brigade "Julia" would have failed to hold it. Additionally the group would have provided fire against enemy forces approaching through the Yugoslavian Socialist Republic of Slovenia.

The W33 nuclear artillery shells for the three heavy artillery groups and W70 nuclear missile warheads for the 3rd Missile Artillery Group "Volturno" were stored in depots guarded by the brigades four infantry companies, but administered by the US Army 559th Artillery Group. These so-called "Special Ammunition Sites" were:

- "Site Pluto" & "Site River": Site Pluto opened in 1955 and was the oldest of the special ammunition sites. Build into a cave system near Longare about 10 km south-east Vicenza it was the main nuclear weapons depot in Italy. At Site Pluto the 28th Field Artillery Detachment and the 69th Ordnance Company stored Honest John warheads, nuclear artillery shells, nuclear land mines and W31 nuclear warheads for the Italian Air Force's MIM-14 Nike-Hercules surface-to-air missile systems. Site River in Tormeno stored the same mix of ammunition and was administered by the 22nd Field Artillery Detachment and housed also the 19th Explosive Ordnance Disposal Detachment. The two sites were guarded by a Carabinieri Company and from 1976 onward also the Aquileia's 2nd Infantry Company. 140 W33 shells for the 9th Heavy Artillery Group "Rovigo" and 140 shells for the 27th Heavy Artillery Group "Marche" were stored at Site Pluto. Since the return of the nuclear weapons to the USA the site is used as ammunition depot for the US 173rd Airborne Brigade Combat Team in Vicenza.
- "Site Aldebaran" in Chiarano was opened in 1967 and administered by the 12th US Army Field Artillery Detachment. W70 warheads for the 1st Battery of the 3rd Missile Artillery Group "Volturno" were stored at the site. The site was guarded by the Aquileia's 3rd Infantry Company.
- "Site Algol" in Orsago fell also under administration of the 12th US Army Field Artillery Detachment. W70 warheads for the 2nd and 3rd Battery of the 3rd Missile Artillery Group "Volturno" were stored at the site. The site was guarded by the Aquileia's 1st Infantry Company. Site Algol was the last of the special ammunition sites to be closed after the Cold War in 1992.
- "Site Castor" in Alvisopoli near Portogruaro was administered by the 28th Field Artillery Detachment and stored warheads for the Honest John missile system, but after the system was retired in 1975 the site was given up and the Aquileia's 2nd Infantry Company moved to guard "Site Pluto".
- "Site Rigel" in Natz was opened in 1967 and administered by the 11th US Army Field Artillery Detachment. 140x W33 shells for the 1st Heavy Artillery Group "Adige" were stored at Site Rigel. The site was guarded by the Aquileia's 4th Infantry Company. In 1983 the depot was closed and the units and ammunition moved to the "San Bernardo" depot.
- "San Bernardo" was an ammunition depot of the Italian Army near Reana del Rojale. After the 1st Heavy Artillery Group "Adige" lost its nuclear role in 1983 the ammunition, the 11th US Army Field Artillery Detachment and the Aquileia's 4th Infantry Company moved to San Bernardo to support the 27th Heavy Artillery Group "Marche".

Each of the three heavy artillery groups had two firing batteries with 4 artillery systems per battery. In the 1980s the W33 nuclear artillery shells were replaced with fewer but more powerful W79 nuclear artillery shells. However, with the introduction of the second version of the MGM-52 Lance tactical surface-to-surface missile system in the 1980s the three Heavy Artillery Battalions lost their nuclear role. As the Lance had a greater range (130 km vs. 20 km), a higher mobility and better accuracy the Italian Army decided to rely on its stockpile of over 100 missiles rather than on artillery to deny Warsaw Pact forces passage through the Alpine valleys. Therefore, the 1st Heavy Artillery Group "Adige" was disbanded on 31 July 1982 with its 8th battery joining the 9th Heavy Artillery Group "Rovigo" as 3rd Battery "Wolves of Elvas". The Rovigo itself lost its nuclear capability in 1986, and the Marche in 1992.

== After the Cold War ==
With the end of the Cold War the Italian Army began to draw down its forces. One of the seven brigades that were disbanded in 1991 was the 3rd Missile Brigade "Aquileia". Already in the 1980s the brigade had lost two of its heavy artillery groups:

- in 1983 the 1st Heavy Artillery Group "Adige" was disbanded and its 8th Battery moved to Verona and joined the 9th Heavy Artillery Group "Rovigo"
- in 1986 the 9th Heavy Artillery Group "Rovigo" lost its nuclear role and together with the 41st Artillery Specialists Group "Cordenons" came under direct command of the 5th Army Corps

At the beginning of 1991 the brigade consisted of the following units:

- 3rd Missile Brigade "Aquileia", in Portogruaro
  - 3rd Missile Artillery Group "Volturno", in Oderzo and Codogné
  - 27th Heavy Self-propelled Artillery Group "Marche", in Udine with M110A2 203mm howitzers
  - 92nd Infantry Battalion "Basilicata" (Recruits Training), in Foligno
  - 13th Target Acquisition Group "Aquileia", in Verona
  - 13th Signal Battalion "Mauria", in Portogruaro
  - 13th Logistic Battalion "Aquileia", in Portogruaro
  - Engineer Company "Aquileia", in Portogruaro
  - 4x infantry companies guarding the nuclear ammunition storage sites in Codogné, Oderzo, Longare and Udine

On 31 January 1991 the Engineer Company and the 2nd Infantry Company at Site Pluto were disbanded. In the course of the year the 92nd Infantry Battalion "Basilicata" was transferred to the Central Military Region and on 30 November 1991 the 13th Logistic Battalion "Aquileia" was disbanded and the 13th Signal Battalion "Mauria" was reduced to 13th Signal Company. On 30 November 1991 the brigade was disbanded, but on 1 December 1991 the 3rd Artillery Regiment "Aquileia" was activated in Portogruaro with brigade's staff and the following units of the brigade:

- 3rd Artillery Regiment "Aquileia", in Portogruaro
  - Command and Support Unit
  - 3rd Missile Artillery Group "Volturno", in Oderzo and Codogné with M270 Multiple Launch Rocket Systems
  - 9th Heavy Artillery Group "Rovigo", in Verona with M115 203mm towed howitzers (transferred on 31 July 1992 to the 4th Alpine Army Corps)
  - 27th Heavy Self-propelled Artillery Group "Marche", in Udine with M110A2 203mm howitzers (left the regiment on 6 September 1992)
  - 13th Target Acquisition Group "Aquileia", in Verona
  - 13th Signal Company, in Portogruaro
  - 3x infantry companies guarding the nuclear ammunition storage sites in Codogné, Oderzo and Udine

In 1992, after the US Army had moved all nuclear warheads back to the United States, the three infantry companies were disbanded. The regiment itself along with the 13th Signal Company was disbanded on 28 September 1992. The remaining units passed to 5th Army Corps. Today the following units of the brigade are still in active service with the Italian Army: the engineer battalion became the 21st Engineer Regiment of the Bersaglieri Brigade "Garibaldi", while the 13th Target Acquisition Group and 41st Artillery Specialists Group "Cordenons" are today part of the army's Tactical Intelligence Brigade: the 41st Regiment "Cordenons" based in Sora is a battlefield surveillance unit equipped with unmanned aerial vehicles and counter-battery radars, while the 13th HUMINT Regiment in Anzio specializes in human intelligence gathering.
