= 27th Artillery Regiment "Marche" =

Inactive Italian Army artillery unit

- 27° Reggimento Artiglieria "Marche"
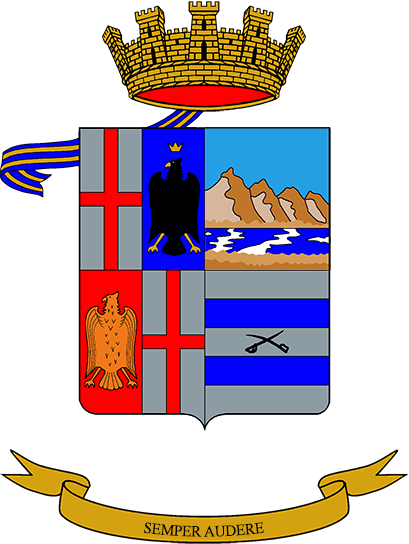
- Regimental coat of arms
- Active: 1 March 1912 - 21 Nov. 1943; 1 March 1948 — 7 Sept. 1995
- Country: Italy
- Branch: Italian Army
- Part of: 5th Army Corps
- Garrison/HQ: Udine
- Motto: "Semper Audere"
- Anniversaries: 15 June 1918 - Second Battle of the Piave River
- Decorations: 1x Bronze Medal of Army Valor

Insignia
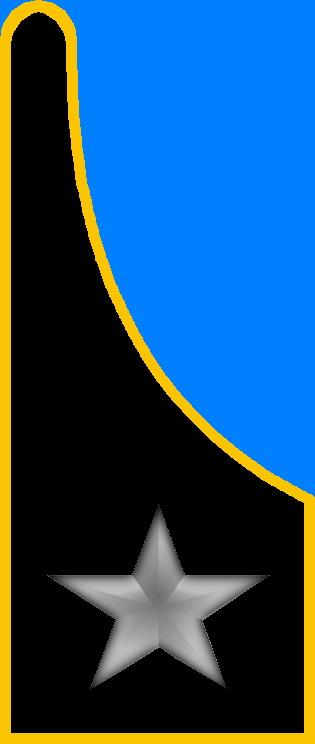
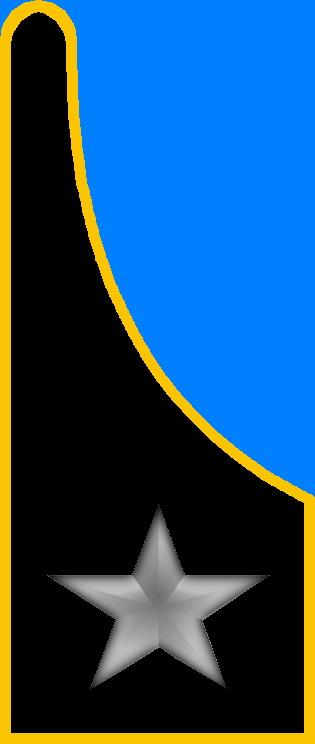
- Regimental gorget patches

The 27th Artillery Regiment "Marche" (Italian: 27° Reggimento Artiglieria "Marche") is an inactive field artillery regiment of the Italian Army, which was based in Udine in Friuli-Venezia Giulia. Originally an artillery regiment of the Royal Italian Army, the regiment was formed in 1912 and served in World War I on the Italian front. In 1935 the regiment was assigned to the 6th Infantry Division "Cuneo", with which the regiment fought in the Greco-Italian War of World War II. The division and regiment were located on the Greek island of Samos in the Eastern Aegean Sea, when the Armistice of Cassibile was announced on 8 September 1943. The division fought against German forces with British support. On 21 November 1943 the regiment dissolved and its personnel sailed for Turkey, where it was interred.

The regiment was reformed in 1948 and assigned to the Infantry Division "Legnano". In 1952 the regiment was transferred to the III Territorial Military Command. In 1964 the regiment was transferred to the V Army Corps and moved from Milan to Udine. In 1976 the regiment passed to the 3rd Missile Brigade "Aquileia". In October 1985 the regiment was reduced 27th Heavy Self-propelled Artillery Group "Marche" and equipped with M110A2 howitzers. In 1986 the Italian Army's nuclear weapons mission was transferred from the 9th Heavy Artillery Group "Rovigo" to the 27th Heavy Self-propelled Artillery Group "Marche", and consequently the US Army's 11th Field Artillery Detachment stored W33 and later W79 nuclear artillery shells for the group at the San Bernardo ammunition depot in Reana del Rojale. In 1992 the group was reorganized as regiment and in 1995 the regiment was disbanded. The regimental anniversary falls, as for all Italian Army artillery regiments, on June 15, the beginning of the Second Battle of the Piave River in 1918.

== History ==
On 1 March 1912 the 27th Field Artillery Regiment was formed in Milan with five batteries ceded by the 6th Field Artillery Regiment (4th and 5th battery) and the 16th Field Artillery Regiment (6th, 7th, and 8th battery). The ceded batteries had participated in 1860-1861 in the campaign to conquer central and southern Italy and fought in the Battle of Castelfidardo in the Marche region. In 1866 the batteries had participated in the Third Italian War of Independence and fought in the Battle of Custoza.

=== World War I ===
At the outbreak of World War I the regiment was assigned, together with the Brigade "Cuneo" and Brigade "Palermo", to the 5th Division. At the time the regiment consisted of a command, three groups with a combined eight batteries equipped with 75/27 mod. 06 field guns, and a depot. During the war the regiment's depot in Milan formed six siege batteries and contributed personnel for the formation of the 50th Field Artillery Regiment.

During the war the regiment served on the Italian front, where the regiment's I and II group were deployed in 1915 on Cima Cadì and the Tonale Pass, while the III Group fought in the Third Battle of the Isonzo at Peteano and Marcottini and in November of the year in the Fourth Battle of the Isonzo on Monte San Michele. In spring and summer 1916 the I and II groups were in the Val Camonica, while the III Group fought in the Fifth Battle of the Isonzo at San Martino del Carso. In June the group was again on Monte San Michele, before it moved to Nova Vas and the Pečinka. The rest of the year the group was deployed on Monte Volkovniak and on Veliki Hrib. In 1917 the entire regiment was sent to the Corno di Cavento and then the Val Camonica. In 1918 the regiment was again the Tonale sector and fought on the slopes of Cima Presena and Cima Zigolón. Later the regiment was arrayed on Monte Mantello. During the decisive Battle of Vittorio Veneto the regiment was again on the Tonale Pass, from where it followed retreating Austro-Hungarian troops down the Val di Sole to Bolzano, where the news of the Armistice of Villa Giusti reached the regiment.

=== Interwar years ===
In 1926 the 27th Field Artillery Regiment was based in Milan and assigned to the 6th Territorial Division of Milan. The regiment consisted of a command, a command unit, a group with 100/17 mod. 14 howitzers, two groups with 75/27 mod. 06 field guns, and one group with mule-carried 75/13 mod. 15 mountain guns, and a depot. In June 1934 one group with 75/27 mod. 06 field guns as disbanded and was replaced by training group in Bra. The training group fielded two batteries with 75/27 mod. 06 field guns and one battery with 100/17 mod. 14 howitzers. In January 1935 the 6th Territorial Division of Milan changed its name to 6th Infantry Division "Legnano" and the artillery regiment was renamed 27th Artillery Regiment "Legnano". During the Second Italo-Ethiopian War the regiment formed the 13th and 124th veterinary infirmaries, which were deployed to East Africa. The regiment also provided 23 officers and 655 enlisted to augment deployed units. On 24 May 1939 the division changed its name to 6th Infantry Division "Cuneo" and the regiment was renamed 27th Artillery Regiment "Cuneo". On 1 September of the same year the regiment ceded a group with 75/27 mod. 06 field guns to the reformed 58th Artillery Regiment "Legnano" of the 58th Infantry Division "Legnano", and a newly formed group with 100/17 mod. 14 howitzers to the reformed 37th Artillery Regiment "Cosseria" of the 5th Infantry Division "Cosseria".

=== World War II ===
On 10 June 1940, the day Italy entered World War II, the regiment consisted of a command, a command unit, a group with 100/17 mod. 14 howitzers, a group with 75/27 mod. 11 field guns, a group with 75/13 mod. 15 mountain guns, an anti-aircraft battery with 20/65 mod. 35 anti-aircraft guns, and a depot. On 1 December 1940 the regiment transferred its group with 75/27 mod. 11 field guns to the 41st Artillery Regiment "Firenze", which in turn transferred its III Group with 75/18 mod. 34 mountain guns to the 27th Artillery Regiment "Cuneo".

In January 1941 the division, which also included the 7th Infantry Regiment "Cuneo" and 8th Infantry Regiment "Cuneo", was sent to Albania to reinforce the Italian units fighting in the Greco-Italian War. By February 1941 the division's units were dispersed along the front in support of other divisions. In April 1941 the division participated in the Battle of Greece. The division remained in Greece and garrisoned the Cyclades in the Aegean Sea. In November 1941 the regiment's depot in Milan formed the 154th Artillery Regiment "Murge" for the 154th Infantry Division "Murge". After the announcement of the Armistice of Cassibile on 8 September 1943 the division fought German forces with British support in the Dodecanese campaign until 21 November, when the division's remaining troops sailed to Turkey.

=== Cold War ===
On 1 March 1948 the regiment was reformed in Milan as 27th Anti-tank Field Artillery Regiment by renaming the 13th Anti-tank Field Artillery Regiment, which had been formed on 1 April 1947 with one anti-tank group ceded by the 11th Field Artillery Regiment. The regiment consisted of a command, a command unit, two groups with QF 17-pounder anti-tank guns, and two groups QF 6-pounder anti-tank guns, one of which was in reserve status. The regiment was assigned to the Infantry Division "Legnano".

On 1 January 1951 the Infantry Division "Legnano" included the following artillery regiments:

- Infantry Division "Legnano", in Bergamo
  - Horse Artillery Regiment, in Milan
  - 11th Field Artillery Regiment, in Cremona
  - 27th Anti-tank Field Artillery Regiment, in Milan
  - 2nd Light Anti-aircraft Artillery Regiment, in Mantua

On 1 January 1952 the regiment left the Infantry Division "Legnano" and was assigned to the III Territorial Military Command and renamed Army Corps Anti-tank Artillery Regiment. The regiment now consisted of a command, a command unit, three groups with QF 17-pounder anti-tank guns, and a light mobile workshop. On 1 April 1952 two of the groups were transferred to the Horse Artillery Regiment and the regiment was renamed 27th Heavy Field Artillery Regiment, which consisted initially of a command, a command unit, and one group with 149/19 mod. 37 howitzers. In the next months the regiment added a second group with 149/19 mod. 37 howitzers and a group with BL 5.5-inch guns.

On 10 May 1954 the regiment formed a Light Aircraft Section with L-21B artillery observation planes. On 30 April 1956 the regiment received its first M44 self-propelled howitzers. On 1 February 1957 the regiment was renamed 27th Heavy Self-propelled Field Artillery Regiment and consisted of a command, a command unit, the I and II self-propelled groups with M44 self-propelled howitzers, the III Group with BL 5.5-inch guns in reserve status, and the Light Aircraft Section. On 10 October 1958 the III Group received M44 self-propelled howitzers and became an active unit.

On 20 April 1964 the 27th Heavy Self-propelled Field Artillery Regiment transferred its units to the Self-propelled Horse Field Artillery Regiment. On the same day the flag of the 27th Artillery Regiment was transferred from Milan to Udine, where it supplanted the flag of the 155th Self-propelled Anti-tank Artillery Regiment, whose flag was transferred to the Shrine of the Flags in the Vittoriano in Rome. Renamed 27th Heavy Self-propelled Artillery Regiment and assigned to V Army Corps, the regiment incorporated the units of the disbanded 155th Self-propelled Anti-tank Artillery Regiment and consisted of a command, a command unit, the I and II groups, which had just switched from M36 tank destroyers to M107 self-propelled guns, and the CXIII Anti-tank Group with M36 tank destroyers. On 17 July of the same year, the CXIII Group was renumbered III Group and replaced its M36 tank destroyers with M107 self-propelled guns. Each of the three groups fielded two batteries with six M107 self-propelled guns per battery.

For its conduct and work after the 1976 Friuli earthquake the regiment was awarded a Bronze Medal of Army Valor, which was affixed to the group's flag and added to the group's coat of arms.

On 1 June 1976 the regiment was reorganized and now consisted of a command, a command and services battery, and the I and II groups. Each of the two groups consisted of a command, a command and services battery, and three batteries with six M107 self-propelled guns per battery. At the time each of the two groups fielded 446 men (31 officers, 49 non-commissioned officers, and 366 soldiers). On 1 September 1977 the regiment was transferred from the 5th Army Corps to the 3rd Missile Brigade "Aquileia".

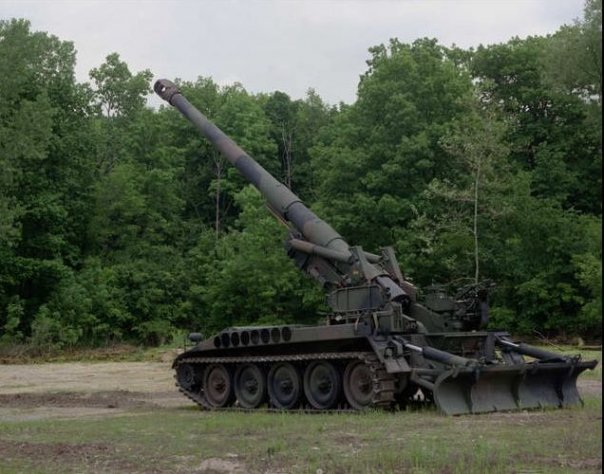
M110A2 of the 27th Heavy Self-propelled Artillery Group "Marche" in 1989

On 1 April 1985 the I Group replaced its M107 self-propelled guns with M110A2 self-propelled howitzers. On 10 October of the same year the II Group was placed in reserve status and the regiment was disbanded. The next day the I Group became an autonomous unit and was renamed 27th Heavy Self-propelled Artillery Group "Marche". The group retained the flag and traditions of the 27th Artillery Regiment and was named for the region, where the batteries, that had formed the regiment in 1912, had fought in the Battle of Castelfidardo in 1860. With the introduction of the M110A2 self-propelled howitzers the group took on the Italian Army's howitzer fired nuclear weapons mission, which until then had been assigned to the 9th Heavy Artillery Group "Rovigo". The US Army's 11th Field Artillery Detachment, which was part of the 559th Artillery Group, stored the W33 and later W79 nuclear artillery shells for the group at the Italian Army's San Bernardo ammunition depot in Reana del Rojale.

=== Recent times ===
On 30 November 1991 the 3rd Missile Brigade "Aquileia" was disbanded and the next day the remaining units of the brigade formed the 3rd Artillery Regiment "Aquileia". On 6 September 1992 the 27th Heavy Self-propelled Artillery Group "Marche" left the 3rd Artillery Regiment "Aquileia" and became an autonomous unit. The next day the group entered the reformed 27th Heavy Self-propelled Artillery Regiment "Marche". On 7 September 1995 the regiment was disbanded and on 27 September the flag of the 27th Artillery Regiment was returned to the Shrine of the Flags in the Vittoriano in Rome.
