= 13th Signal Battalion "Mauria" =

Inactive Italian Army signal unit

- 13° Battaglione Trasmissioni "Mauria"
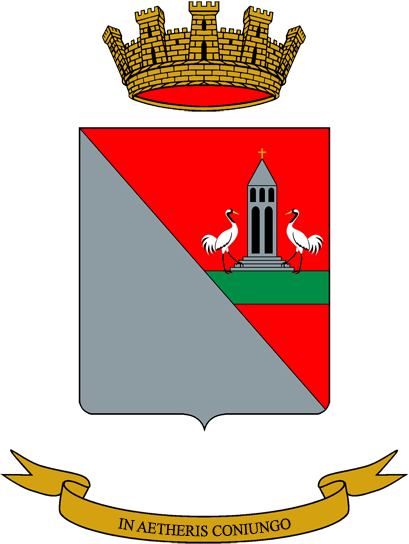
- Battalion coat of arms
- Active: 1 Oct. 1975 — 30 Nov. 1991
- Country: Italy
- Branch: Italian Army
- Role: Military signals
- Part of: 3rd Missile Brigade "Aquileia"
- Garrison/HQ: Portogruaro
- Motto(s): "In aetheris coniungo"
- Anniversaries: 20 June 1918 - Second Battle of the Piave River

Insignia
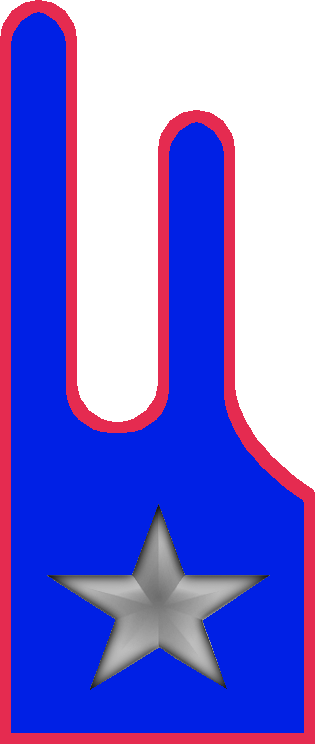
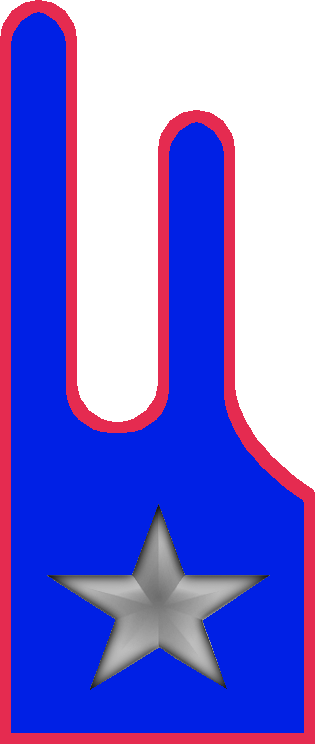
- Signallers gorget patches

The 13th Signal Battalion "Mauria" (Italian: 13° Battaglione Trasmissioni "Mauria") is an inactive signals unit of the Italian Army last based in Portogruaro in Veneto. Formed during the 1975 army reform the battalion was named for the Mauria Pass and assigned to the 3rd Missile Brigade "Aquileia". The battalion's anniversary falls, as for all signal units, on 20 June 1918, the day the Austro-Hungarian Army began its retreat across the Piave river during the Second Battle of the Piave River.

== History ==
On 1 December 1959, the Missile Brigade Signal Company was formed in Vicenza. The company was assigned to the III Missile Brigade, which was armed with missile and artillery systems capable of firing tactical nuclear weapons as part of Italy's participation in NATOs nuclear sharing program.

On 1 June 1961, the company was renamed 13th Signal Company and in May 1965 the company moved from Vicenza to Portogruaro. On 1 January 1968, the company was expanded to XIII Signal Battalion. At the time the battalion consisted of a command, a command and services platoon, and two signal companies.

During the 1975 army reform the army disbanded the regimental level and battalions were granted for the first time their own flags. During the reform signal battalions were renamed for mountain passes. On 1 October 1975, the XIII Signal Battalion was renamed 13th Signal Battalion "Mauria". The battalion was named for the Mauria Pass, which connects the Veneto and Friuli-Venezia Giulia regions. On 12 November 1976, the President of the Italian Republic Giovanni Leone granted with decree 846 the battalion a flag.

With the end of the Cold War the Italian Army began to draw down its forces. Consequently, on 30 November 1991, the 13th Signal Battalion "Mauria" was reduced to 13th Signal Company, which the next day entered the 3rd Artillery Regiment "Aquileia". On 5 December 1991, the flag of the 13th Signal Battalion "Mauria" was transferred to the Shrine of the Flags in the Vittoriano in Rome for safekeeping.
