= Corrado Mazzoni =

Italian Lieutenant of World War I

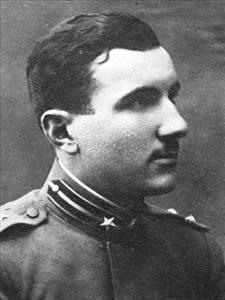
- Born: 12 May 1892; Bologna, Emilia-Romagna, Italy
- Died: 30 August 1917 (aged 25); Veliki Hrib, Austrian Littoral, Austria-Hungary
- Education: University of Bologna
- Military career
- Allegiance: Italy
- Branch: Royal Italian Army
- Service years: 1914–1917
- Rank: Tenente
- Unit: 67th Infantry Regiment
- Conflicts: World War I †: Italian Front; Tenth Battle of the Isonzo; Eleventh Battle of the Isonzo
- Awards: Gold Medal of Military Valour

Corrado Mazzoni was an Italian Lieutenant of World War I. He was an officer within the 67th Infantry Regiment and took part in the Tenth Battle of the Isonzo and the Eleventh Battle of the Isonzo before succumbing to wounds during a siege at Veliki Hrib. He was a posthumous recipient of the Gold Medal of Military Valour for his service during the war.

== Biography ==
Corrado was born in Bologna on 12 May 1892 as the son of Carlo and Emilia Melloni. He attended the "Galvani" High School and then enrolled in the veterinary medicine faculty of the University of Bologna.

In 1914, he was called to lend military service in the Royal Italian Army, being enlisted and assigned to the infantry arm of the 35th Infantry Regiment. He attended the course for cadet officers, obtaining the grades of second lieutenant in November and was transferred to the 67th Infantry Regiment of the "Palermo" Brigade stationed in Como.

On 24 May 1915, with the Italian entry into World War I, he followed his own unit to the front, first in the sector of the Upper Camonica Valley, and then in that of the Isonzo River. In August 1916, he was promoted to lieutenant on active permanent duty for war merit. In the spring of 1917, the 67th Infantry Regiment was operating in the sector of Monte Santo di Gorizia. On 23 May, during the Tenth Battle of the Isonzo, due to the excellent service performed during a dangerous assault against Monte Santo, Mazzoni obtained a Solemn Commendation. On 17 August, at the start of the offensive that will give rise to the Eleventh Battle of the Isonzo, the 67th Infantry Regiment was sent to the Sella di Dol area, with the aim of attacking the stronghold of Veliki Hrib.

On 29 August, under the command of the 2nd Company of the 1st Battalion, he launched an assault on the hill known as Quota 526, managing to conquer a stretch of trench. Despite being wounded and surrounded by enemy reinforcements, he managed to evade capture. The following day, after refusing to abandon his post to receive adequate treatment following a fresh wound in his leg, he again launched the assault on Veliki Hrib. During the charge, he was reported saying Viva l'Italia, viva il 67°!!, ("Long live Italy, Long Live the 67th!") Arriving on the enemy trench after a dense launch of hand grenades however, he was hit by two rifle bullets in the abdomen. Mazzoni was carried to the rescue station where he died a short time later.

Initially buried in the war cemetery of Vallensa, in 1922 his remains were reinterred to the Certosa di Bologna. With a Lieutenant Decree of 13 June 1918, he was posthumously awarded the Gold Medal of Military Valour, and on 9 January of the same year, the University of Bologna had awarded him a posthumous honorary degree in veterinary medicine.

== Legacy ==
In his home city of Bologna, the Corrado Mazzoni Carabinieri barracks, Via Corrado Mazzoni and the nursery school "Corrado Mazzoni" are all named after him in his honour. In Como, at the De Cristoforis barracks, where the 67th Infantry Regiment was based, there is a commemorative plaque dedicated to him.

== Wartime citations ==
He repeatedly led his company into the assault, displaying admirable dash and courage. Wounded and surrounded by the enemy in preponderant forces, he managed, despite the significant losses suffered, to open a passage with hand grenades and escape them. The next day, having launched the assault again, although wounded a second time by a bullet in the leg, he courageously continued the action and was the first to bravely penetrate the enemy trench, where he was hit again, and fatally, by two bullets in the chest . Veliki Hrib, June 29–30, 1917.

— Citation for the Gold Medal of Military Valor, Lieutenant Decree of June 13, 1918.

As a provisioning officer he carried out his service in an exemplary way, overcoming, for ten days, under the incessant enemy bombardment, very serious difficulties, and giving proof of courage, energy and pertinacity, never missing food and water at the regiment. Monte Santo, 17–26 May 1917.

— Advancement on Merit of War
