= 13th HUMINT Regiment (Italy) =

Active Italian Army human intelligence unit

- 13° Reggimento HUMINT
- Regimental coat of arms
- Active: 16 Dec. 1986 — 30 Sept. 1993; 28 June 2005 — today
- Country: Italy
- Branch: Italian Army
- Type: Human Intelligence
- Part of: Tactical Intelligence Brigade
- Garrison/HQ: Anzio
- Motto(s): "Per angusta ad augusta"
- Anniversaries: 15 June 1918 - Second Battle of the Piave River
- Decorations: 1× Gold Cross of Army Merit

Insignia
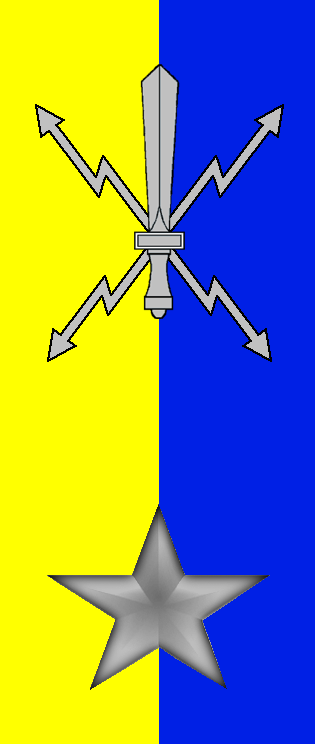
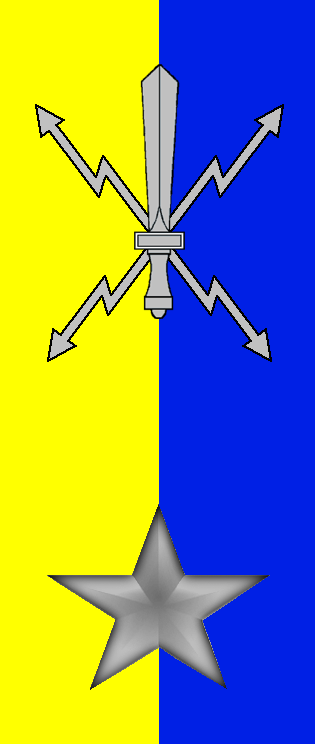
- Regimental gorget patches

The 13th HUMINT Regiment (Italian: 13° Reggimento HUMINT) is the Italian Army's only Human Intelligence unit. On 1 August 1960, the Italian Army formed a Target Acquisition Battalion for the III Missile Brigade. In 1993 the battalion was disbanded. In 2005, the battalion was reformed as a human intelligence battalion and assigned to the RISTA-EW Brigade. Originally the battalion was part of the army's artillery arm, but since becoming a human intelligence unit it has been designated as a "multi-arms unit". In 2018, the battalion was expanded to regiment and assigned to the Tactical Intelligence Brigade, which combines elements of the artillery and signal arms. The regiment is based in Anzio in Lazio. The regiment's anniversary falls, as for all Italian Army artillery units, on June 15, the beginning of the Second Battle of the Piave River in 1918.

== History ==
=== Cold War ===
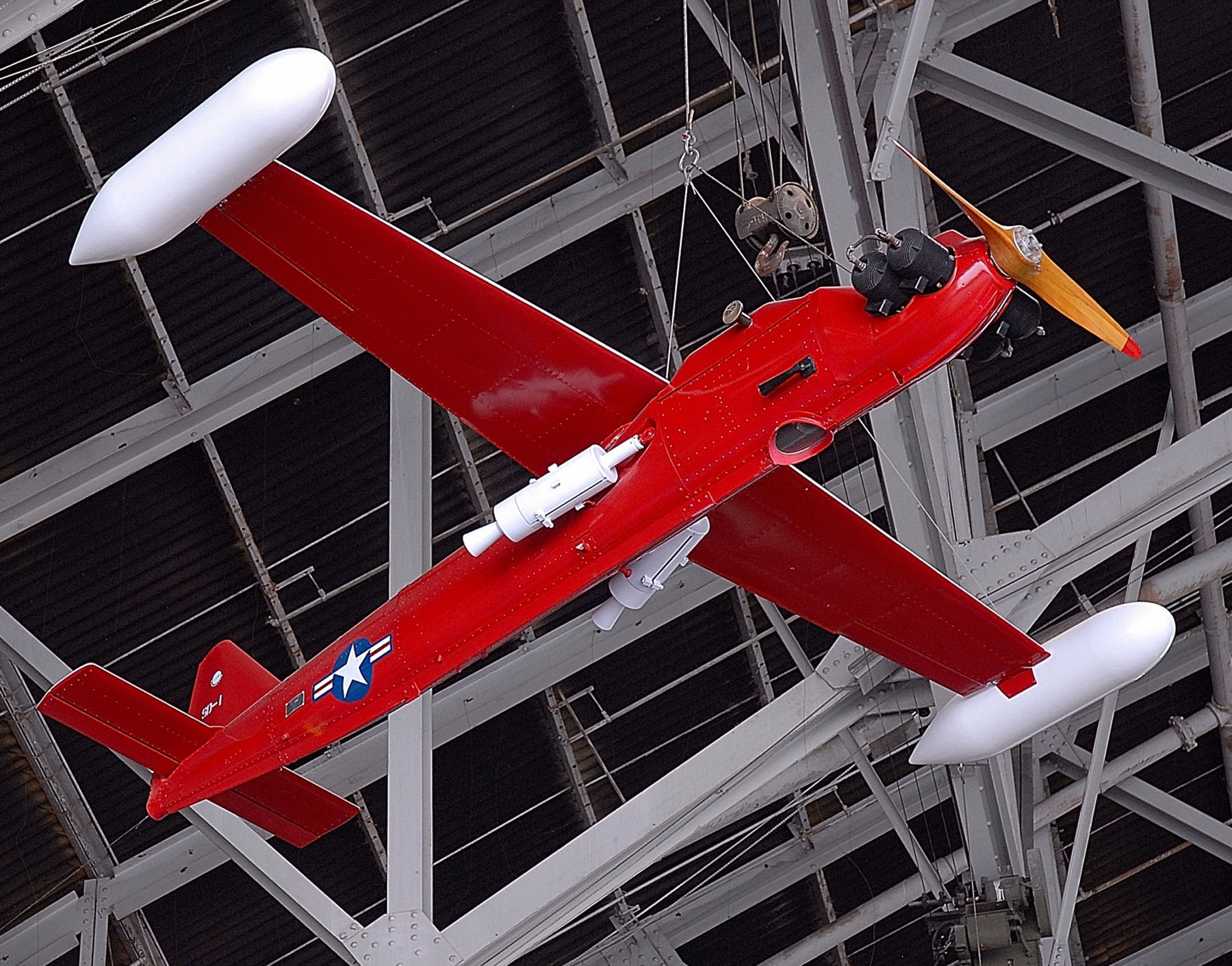
A RP-7l Falconer - AN/USD-1B drone

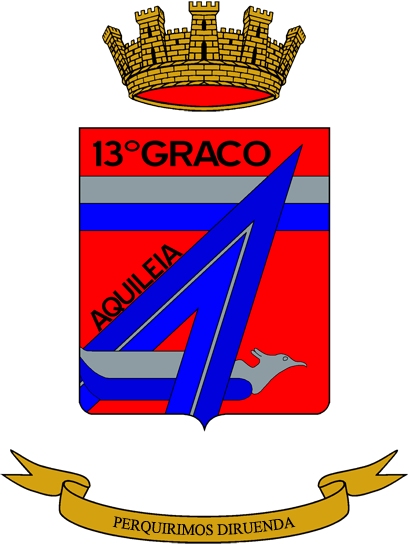
Coat of arms of the 13th Target Acquisition Group "Aquileia"

On 1 August 1960, the Italian Army formed a Target Acquisition Battalion in Vicenza, which was assigned to the III Missile Brigade. On 1 January 1961, the battalion was renamed XIII Artillery Reconnaissance Group and, on 1 September 1962, XIII Target Acquisition Group. The group consisted of a command, a command unit, the 1st Battery, which included a paratroopers section, and a light aviation component with SM.1019A planes. The group was tasked with tactical surveillance, target acquisition, and reconnaissance after the use of tactical nuclear weapons by the III Missile Brigade.

On 1 March 1963, the group moved to Montorio Veronese, while the light aviation component moved to Boscomantico Airport near Verona. In 1964, the group added a Remote-controlled Aircraft Section with RP-7l Falconer - AN/USD-1B drones, and in 1967 the group received AB-204B helicopters. In October 1969, the group moved to Verona and, on 1 September 1973, it was renamed XIII Reconnaissance and Target Acquisition Group (Italian: XIII Gruppo Ricognizione ed Acquisizione Obiettivi - abbreviated XIII GRACO).

During the 1975 army reform the army disbanded the regimental level and newly independent battalions were granted for the first time their own flags, respectively in the case of cavalry units, their own standard. On 1 October 1975, the XIII Reconnaissance and Target Acquisition Group was renamed 13th Target Acquisition Group "Aquileia" (Italian: 13° Gruppo Acquisizione Obiettivi "Aquileia"). On the same day the III Missile Brigade's Light Aviation Unit was merged into the group. After the reform the group consisted of the following units:

- 13th Target Acquisition Group "Aquileia"
  - Group Command
  - Command and Services Battery
  - Reconnaissance and Target Acquisition Battery
  - Remote-controlled Aircraft Battery, with CL-89B "Midge" drones
  - Air Component, at Boscomantico Airport
    - 398th Light Airplanes Squadron, with SM.1019A planes
    - 598th Multirole Helicopters Squadron, with AB-204B helicopters
    - Light Aircraft Maintenance Squadron

On 29 November 1985, the Air Component was disbanded. On 16 December 1986, the President of the Italian Republic Francesco Cossiga granted the group its flag. On 1 December 1991, the 3rd Missile Brigade "Aquileia" was reduced to 3rd Artillery Regiment "Aquileia". On 28 September 1992, the regiment was disbanded and the 13th Target Acquisition Group "Aquileia" was transferred to the Artillery Command of the 5th Army Corps. On 31 July 1993, the group transferred its Remote-controlled Aircraft Battery to the 41st Specialists Group "Cordenons" and the group's paratroopers company became an autonomous unit under the 5th Army Corps' Artillery Command. On 30 September 1993, the group was disbanded and its flag transferred on 10 November 1993 to the Shrine of the Flags in the Vittoriano in Rome for safekeeping.

=== Recent times ===
On 28 June 2005, the Italian Army formed the 13th Battalion "Aquileia" in Anzio. The new battalion was tasked with collecting human Intelligence and assigned to the RISTA-EW Brigade. After its formation, the battalion was assigned the flag and traditions of the 13th Target Acquisition Group "Aquileia". On 5 November 2018, the RISTA-EW Brigade was renamed Tactical Intelligence Brigade and on the same day the 13th Battalion "Aquileia" was reorganized as 13th HUMINT Regiment.

== Organization ==
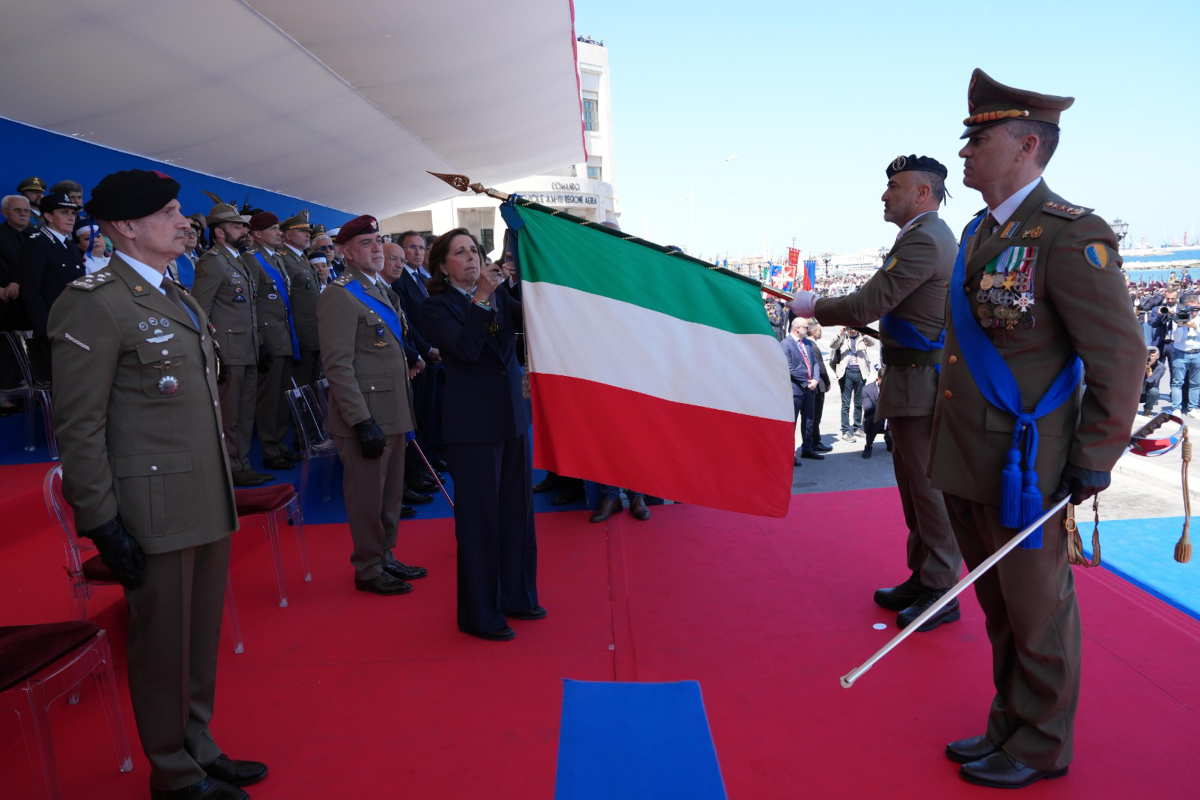
Undersecretary of Defence Isabella Rauti affixes the Gold Cross of Army Merit awarded to 13th HUMINT Regiment to the regiment's flag

As of 2025 the 13th HUMINT Regiment is organized as follows:

- 13th HUMINT Regiment, in Anzio
  - Command and Logistic Support Company
  - HUMINT Battalion "Aquileia"
    - 1st HUMINT Company
    - 2nd HUMINT Company
    - 3rd HUMINT Company
