= Ronchis =

Ronchis Roncjis (Friulian)
- Comune
- Comune di Ronchis / Comun di Roncjis
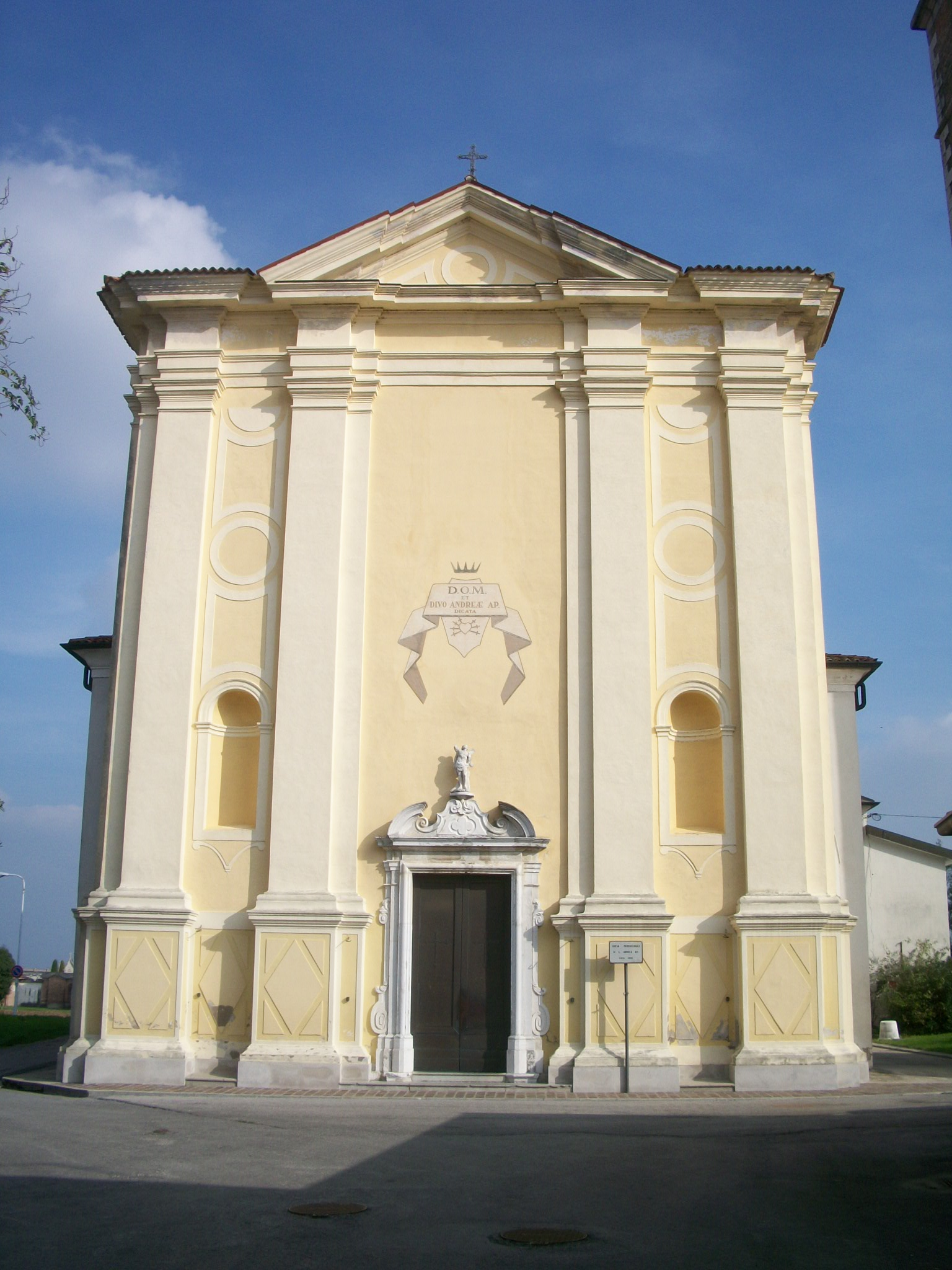
- Church of Saint Andrew the Apostle

- Coat of arms

- Location within Italy Location within Friuli-Venezia Giulia
- Coordinates: 45°49′N 13°7′E
- Country: Italy
- Region: Friuli-Venezia Giulia
- Province: Udine (UD)
- Frazioni: Fraforeano (Frofean)

Government
  - Mayor: Manfredi Michelutto

Area
  - Total: 18.4 km^{2} (7.1 sq mi)
- Elevation: 15 m (49 ft)

Population (30 April 2017)
  - Total: 2,017
  - Density: 110/km^{2} (284/sq mi)
- Demonym: Roncolini
- Time zone: UTC+1 (CET)
  - Summer (DST): UTC+2 (CEST)
- Postal code: 33050
- Dialing code: 0431
- Patron saint: St. Andrew
- Saint day: 30 November
- Website: Official website

Ronchis (Friulian: Roncjis) is a comune (municipality) in the Regional decentralization entity of Udine in the Italian region of Friuli-Venezia Giulia, located about 60 kilometres (37 mi) northwest of Trieste and about 30 kilometres (19 mi) southwest of Udine.

Ronchis borders the following municipalities: Latisana, Palazzolo dello Stella, Rivignano Teor, San Michele al Tagliamento, Varmo.
