= 21st Engineer Regiment (Italy) =

Active Italian Army combat engineer unit

- 21° Reggimento Genio Guastatori
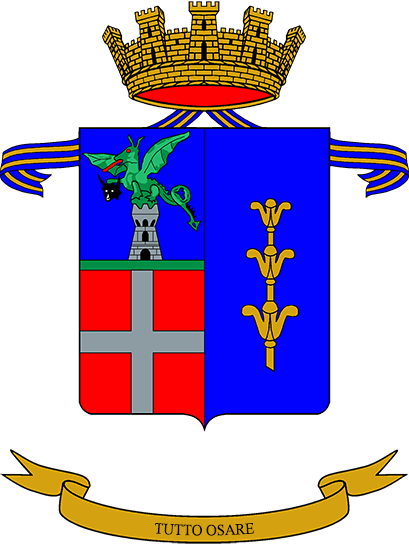
- Regimental coat of arms
- Active: 1 Oct. 1937 — Nov. 1942; 1 Oct. 1975 — today
- Country: Italy
- Branch: Italian Army
- Role: Combat engineers
- Part of: Bersaglieri Brigade "Garibaldi"
- Garrison/HQ: Caserta
- Motto(s): "Tutto osare"
- Anniversaries: 24 June 1918 - Second Battle of the Piave River
- Decorations: 1× Silver Medal of Army Valor; 1× Bronze Medal of Army Valor; 1× Bronze Cross of Army Merit; 1× Gold Medal of Civil Merit; 1× Bronze Medal of Civil Merit

Insignia
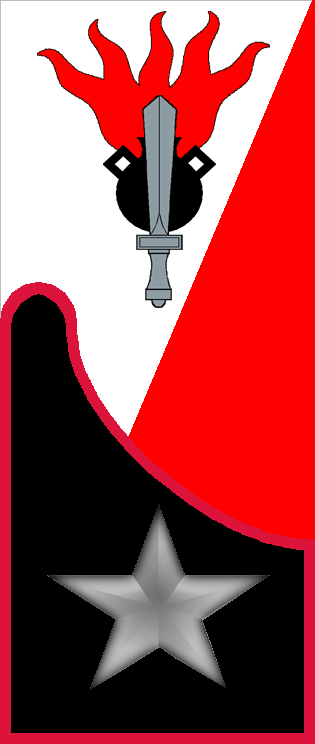
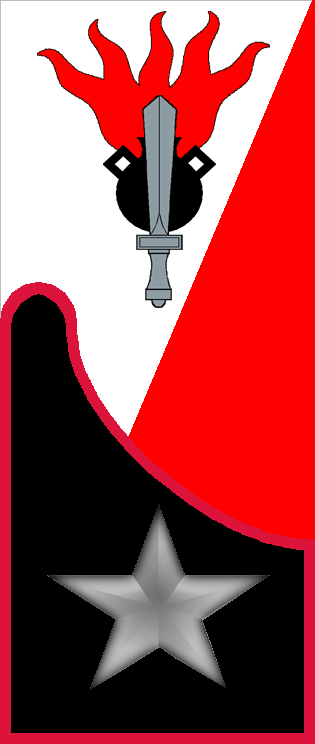
- Sappers gorget patches

The 21st Engineer Regiment (Italian: 21° Reggimento Genio Guastatori) is a military engineering regiment of the Italian Army based in Caserta in Campania. The regiment is the engineer unit of the Bersaglieri Brigade "Garibaldi". The regiment was formed in 1937 and assigned to the XXI Army Corps, which was based in Cyrenaica in eastern Libya. During World War II the regiment formed engineer units for the Italian forces fighting in the Western Desert campaign. After the Axis defeat in the Second Battle of El Alamein and the British conquest of Cyrenaica the regiment was declared lost due to wartime events.

The unit was reformed in 1953 in Trani as a battalion. In 1963, the battalion moved to Vicenza, where it joined the III Missile Brigade. In 1975, the battalion was named for the Timavo river and assigned the flag and traditions of the 21st Engineer Regiment. At the end of 1979, the battalion moved to Caserta in the South of Italy. In 1993, the battalion lost its autonomy and entered the reformed 21st Engineer Regiment. The regiment's anniversary falls, as for all engineer units, on 24 June 1918, the last day of the Second Battle of the Piave River.

== History ==
=== Interwar years ===
On 1 October 1937, the depot of the Royal Italian Army's 9th Engineer Regiment in Trani formed the 21st Engineer Regiment for the XXI Army Corps, which was based in the eastern part of Italian Libya known as Cyrenaica. On 17 October of the same year, the new regiment arrived at its base in Benghazi in Libya. The regiment was assigned the existing II, LXII, and LXIII mixed engineer battalions, each of which consisted of an engineer company and a connections company. Upon entering the new regiment the three battalions were renumbered and on 1 January 1938, the regiment consisted of a command, a command unit, and the I, II, and III mixed engineer battalions. On 4 July 1938, the regiment's depot in Benghazi became operational.

=== World War II ===
During World War II the regiment's depot in Benghazi mobilized the following units:

- XXI Army Corps Engineer Battalion (for the XXI Army Corps)
- XXI Army Corps Connections Battalion (for the XXI Army Corps)
- LXII Mixed Engineer Battalion (for the 62nd Infantry Division "Marmarica")
- LXIII Mixed Engineer Battalion (for the 63rd Infantry Division "Cirene")

The regiment's battalions fought in the Western Desert campaign. The regiment was declared lost after the Axis defeat in the Second Battle of El Alamein in November 1942 and the following British conquest of Cyrenaica.

=== Cold War ===
On 1 January 1953, the XXI Engineer Battalion was formed in Trani, which consisted of a command, two engineer companies, and a field park company. On 19 January 1963, the battalion moved from Trani to Vicenza in northern Italy, where it joined the III Missile Brigade. The III Missile Brigade was the Italian Army's nuclear sharing unit.

During the 1975 army reform the army disbanded the regimental level and newly independent battalions were granted for the first time their own flags. During the reform engineer battalions were named for a lake, if they supported an corps-level command, or a river, if they supported a division or brigade. On 1 October 1975, the XXI Engineer Battalion was renamed 21st Engineer Battalion "Timavo". The battalion was named for the Timavo river, which was fiercely contested between the Royal Italian Army and the Austro-Hungarian Army during World War I. After the reform the 21st Engineer Battalion "Timavo" consisted of a command, a command and park company, and two engineer companies. At the time the battalion fielded 527 men (30 officers, 68 non-commissioned officers, and 429 soldiers).

On 12 November 1976, the President of the Italian Republic Giovanni Leone assigned with decree 846 the flag and traditions of the 21st Engineer Regiment to the battalion. On 1 February 1976, the battalion received from the 3rd Missile Brigade "Aquileia" the 2nd Fusiliers Company in Vicenza, which was tasked with guarding the nuclear weapons depots "Site Pluto" in Longare and "Site River" in Tormeno.

On 1 February 1979, an engineer battalion was formed in Caserta in southern Italy. On 31 December 1979, the 21st Engineer Battalion "Timavo" in Vicenza was disbanded, with only one autonomous engineer company remaining active to cover the engineering needs of the 3rd Missile Brigade "Aquileia". The 21st Engineer Regiment's flag was then transferred to Caserta in the South of Italy, where the next day, on 1 January 1980, the engineer battalion in Caserta was renamed 21st Engineer Battalion "Timavo". The battalion was assigned to the Southern Military Region and consisted of a command, a command and park company, and two engineer companies.

For its conduct and work after the 1980 Irpinia earthquake the battalion was awarded a Bronze Medal of Army Valor, which was affixed to the battalion's flag and is depicted on the battalion's coat of arms. On 1 January 1981, the battalion formed a third engineer company and on 1 January 1987, the Command and Park Company split into the Command and Services Company and the Special Equipment Company. Afterwards the battalion consisted of the following units:

- 21st Engineer Battalion "Timavo", in Caserta
  - Command and Services Company
  - 1st Engineer Company
  - 2nd Engineer Company
  - 3rd Engineer Company
  - Special Equipment Company

=== Recent times ===
On 21 September 1993, the 21st Engineer Battalion "Timavo" lost its autonomy and the next day the battalion entered the reformed 21st Pioneers Regiment as Pioneers Battalion "Timavo". On 1 October 2000, the regiment was renamed 21st Engineer Regiment and, on 1 December of the same year, it was transferred from the Southern Military Region to the Bersaglieri Brigade "Garibaldi".

On 26 June 2003, the regiment deployed to Nasiriyah in Iraq. Taking up garrison and peacekeeping duties in the city the regiment found itself soon embroiled in the Iraqi insurgency. On 7 December 2003, the regiment left Iraq and returned to Italy. For its conduct in Iraq the regiment was awarded a Silver Medal of Army Valor, which was affixed to the regiment's flag and is depicted on the regiment's coat of arms. After the August 2016 earthquake in Central Italy the regiment's companies deployed to the area to assist in the recovery efforts and to provide engineering services to the affected communities. For its service after the earthquake the regiment was awarded a Bronze Cross of Army Merit, which was affixed to the regiment's flag.

== Organization ==
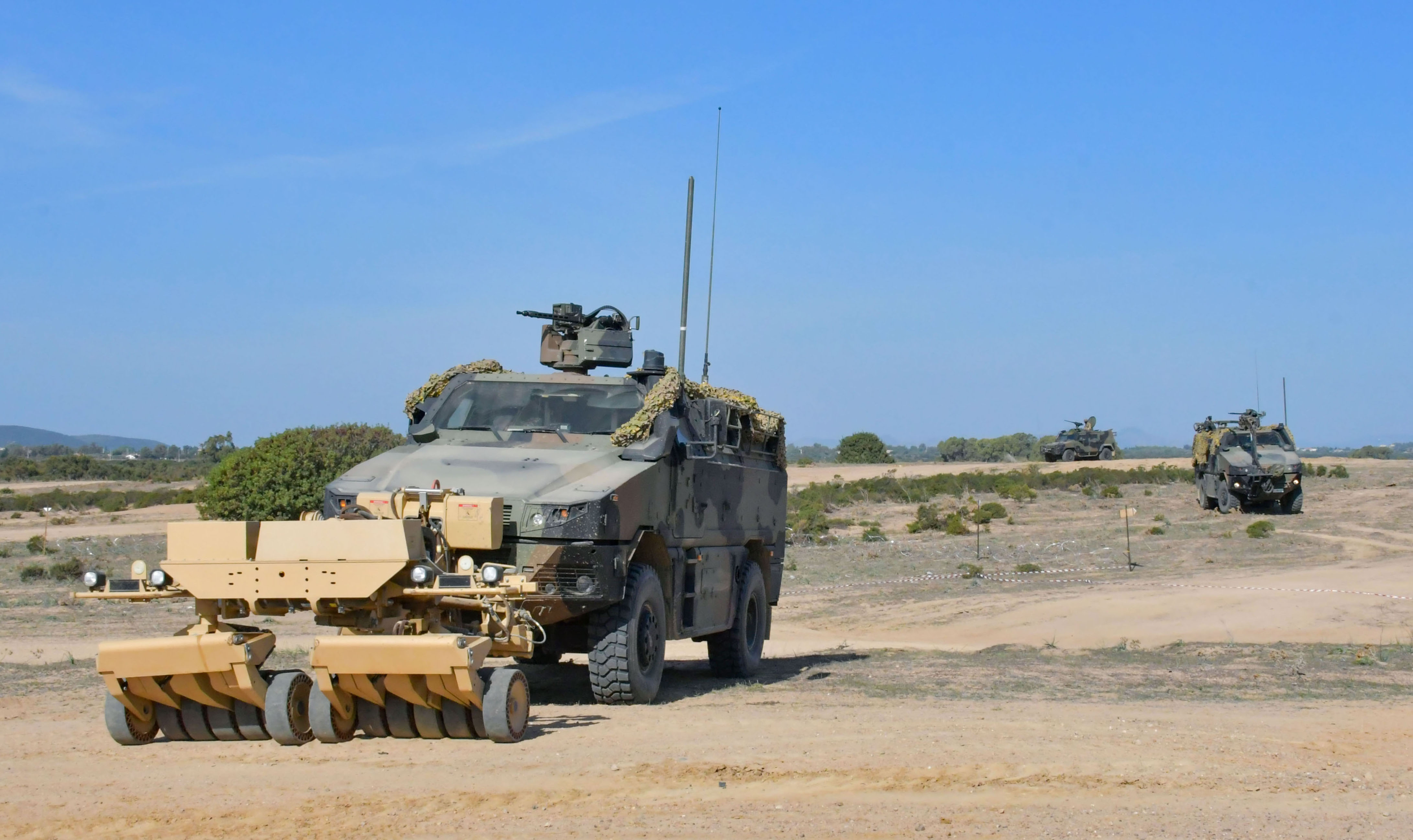
21st Engineer Regiment VTMM Orso ACRT-RC vehicles during an exercise

As of 2024 the 21st Engineer Regiment is organized as follows:

- 21st Engineer Regiment, in Caserta
  - Command and Logistic Support Company
  - Sappers Battalion "Timavo"
    - 1st Sappers Company
    - 2nd Sappers Company
    - 3rd Sappers Company
    - 4th Deployment Support Company
  - Engineer Company, in Castrovillari

The Engineer Company in Castrovillari provides disaster relief and emergency support for the Calabria region.

== See also ==
- Bersaglieri Brigade "Garibaldi"
