= Morsano al Tagliamento =

Morsano al Tagliamento Morsan (Friulian)
- Comune
- Comune di Morsano al Tagliamento
- Coat of arms

- Location within Italy Location within Friuli-Venezia Giulia
- Coordinates: 45°55′N 12°57′E
- Country: Italy
- Region: Friuli-Venezia Giulia
- Province: Pordenone (PN)
- Frazioni: Bando, Mussons, Saletto, San Paolo al Tagliamento

Government
  - Mayor: Piero Barei

Area
  - Total: 32.2 km^{2} (12.4 sq mi)
- Elevation: 14 m (46 ft)

Population (31 December 2014)
  - Total: 2,811
  - Density: 87.3/km^{2} (226/sq mi)
- Demonym: Morsanesi
- Time zone: UTC+1 (CET)
  - Summer (DST): UTC+2 (CEST)
- Postal code: 33075
- Dialing code: 0434
- Website: Official website

Morsano al Tagliamento (Standard Friulian: Morsàn da lis Ocjis, Western Friulian: Morsan) is a comune (municipality) in the Regional decentralization entity of Pordenone in the Italian region of Friuli-Venezia Giulia, located about 70 kilometres (43 mi) northwest of Trieste and about 25 kilometres (16 mi) east of Pordenone.

== Geography ==
Morsano borders the following municipalities: Camino al Tagliamento, Cordovado, Fossalta di Portogruaro, San Michele al Tagliamento, San Vito al Tagliamento, Sesto al Reghena, Teglio Veneto, Varmo.
