= Varmo =

Varmo Vildivar (Friulian)
- Comune
- Comune di Varmo
- Location of Varmo in Italy Varmo (Friuli-Venezia Giulia)
- Coordinates: 45°53′14″N 12°59′23″E
- Country: Italy
- Region: Friuli-Venezia Giulia
- Province: Udine (UD)
- Frazioni: Varmo, Santa Marizza, Levata), Gradiscutta, Belgrado, Casali di Belgrado, Roveredo, Romans, Canussio, Isola Maura, Madrisio, Casenove, Cornazzai, Santa Marizzutta, Casali Pepe, S. P. Ponte di Madrisio

Government
  - Mayor: Sergio Michelin

Area
  - Total: 34.92 km^{2} (13.48 sq mi)
- Elevation: 18 m (59 ft)

Population (30 April 2017)
  - Total: 2,769
  - Density: 79.30/km^{2} (205.4/sq mi)
- Demonym: Varmesi
- Time zone: UTC+1 (CET)
  - Summer (DST): UTC+2 (CEST)
- Postal code: 33030
- Dialing code: 0432
- Website: Official website

Varmo (Friulian: Vildivar) is a comune (municipality) in the Regional decentralization entity of Udine in the Italian region of Friuli-Venezia Giulia, located about 70 kilometres (43 mi) northwest of Trieste and about 30 kilometres (19 mi) southwest of Udine.

Varmo borders the following municipalities: Bertiolo, Camino al Tagliamento, Codroipo, Morsano al Tagliamento, Rivignano, Ronchis, San Michele al Tagliamento.

The Municipality of Varmo includes 9 towns, and various localities: the main town of Varmo, Santa Marizza (with Levata), Gradiscutta, Belgrado (with Casali di Belgrado), Roveredo, Romans, Canussio (with Isola Maura, beyond the Tagliamento River), Madrisio (with Casenove) and Cornazzai (with Santa Marizzutta, Casali Pepe and S. P. Ponte di Madrisio).

== History ==
In c. 1462, the former Despot of Serbia (r. 1458–1459) Stefan Branković acquired the castle of Belgrado, where he lived with his family, until his death in 1476.

=== Symbols ===
The coat of arms and the gonfalon were granted by royal decree of 14 October 1937. The coat of arms is a crenellated shield of five pieces: the first is gules, with a wavy silver fillet; the second is argent, with a band of azure. The gonfalon is a truncated banner of white and red.

== Sources ==
- Spremić, Momčilo (2004). "La famille serbe des Branković – considérations généalogiques et héraldiques" (PDF). Зборник радова Византолошког института (in French). 41: 441–452.
