= Tagliamento =

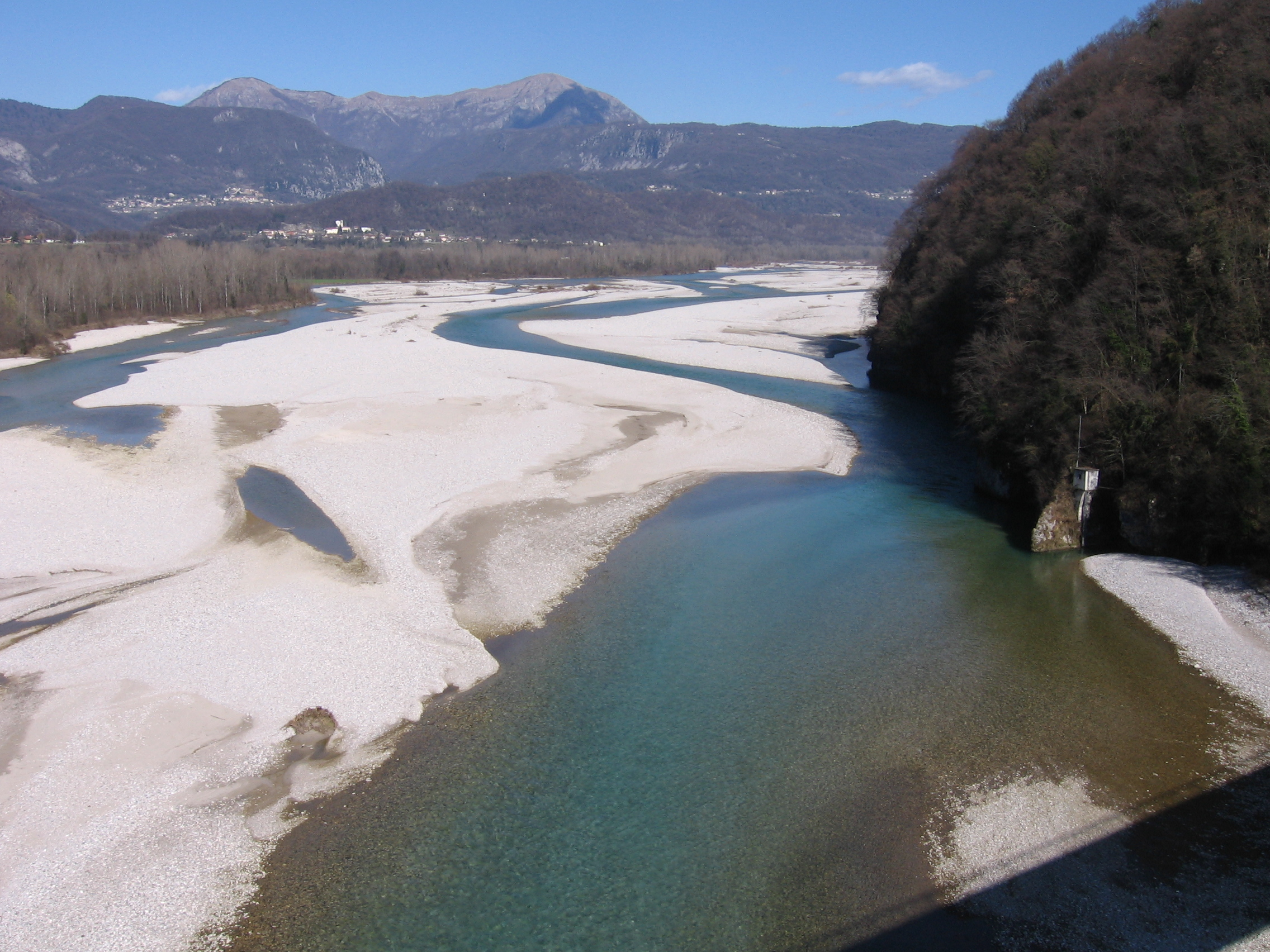
- The Tagliamento from the Pinzano's Bridge
- Native name: Tiliment (Friulian); Tajamento (Venetian)

Location
- Country: Italy

Physical characteristics
- Source
  - location: Mauria Pass, Friuli, Italy
  - coordinates: 46.449°N 12.522°E
  - elevation: 1,195 m (3,921 ft)
- Mouth
  - location: Adriatic Sea
  - coordinates: 45.644°N 13.101°E
- Length: 178 km (111 mi)
- Basin size: 2,916 km^{2} (1,126 sq mi)

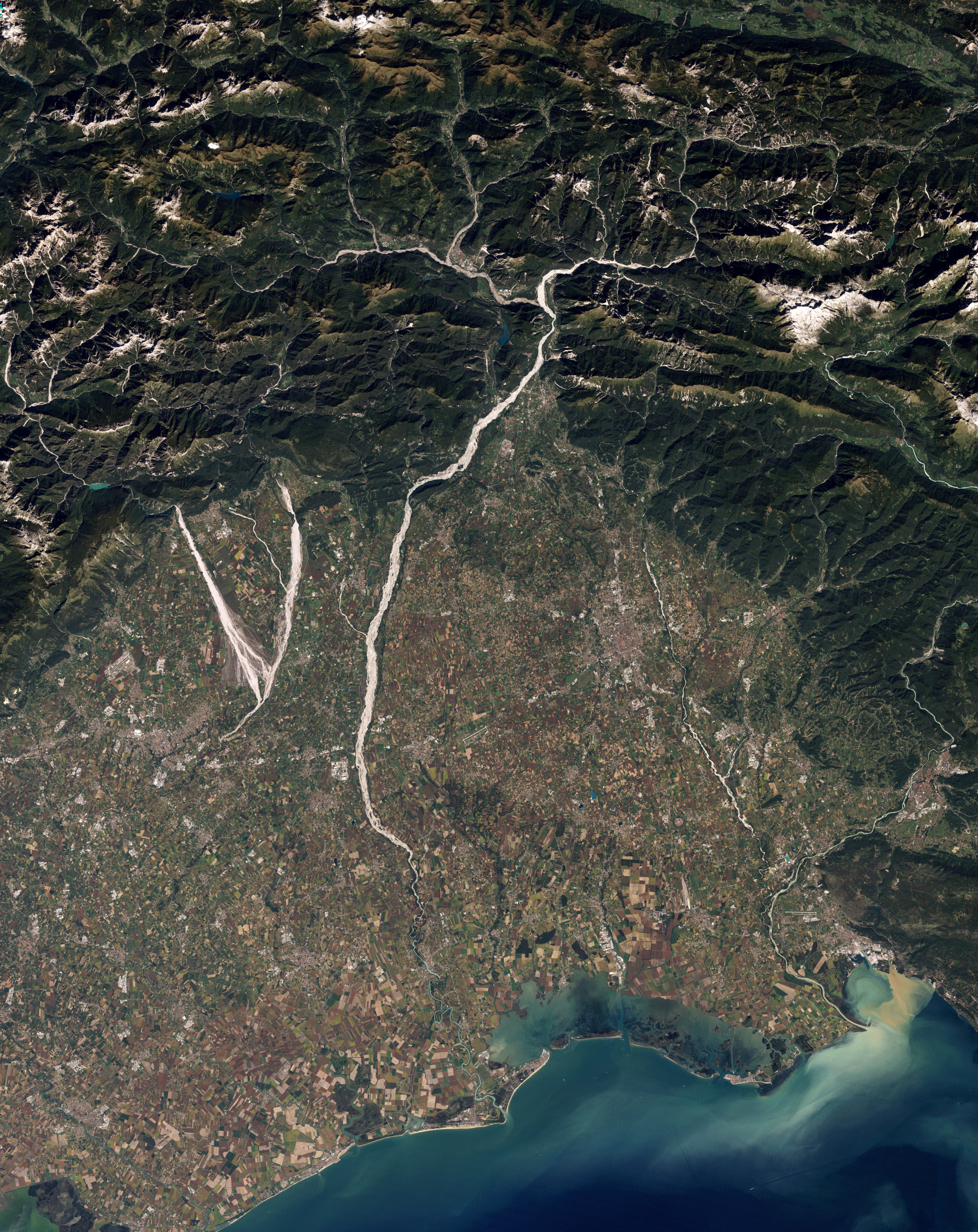
Natural-colour satellite image of north-eastern Italy showing parts of the Cellina, Meduna, and Tagliamento rivers

The Tagliamento (Italian: [taʎʎaˈmento]; Friulian: Tiliment; Venetian: Tajamento) is a braided river in north-east Italy, flowing from the Alps to the Adriatic Sea at a point between Trieste and Venice.

The Tagliamento river is considered as the last morphologically intact river in the Alps; its course has not been altered by human intervention. For this reason, it has been the subject of many scientific investigations into its peculiar characteristics: these include its 150 km long corridor which connects the Alps and the Adriatic Sea, its unconstrained floodplain, which hosts several aquatic and terrestrial habitats, and its over 600 islands.

The source is in the Mauria Pass, on the border between the regions of Veneto and Friuli-Venezia Giulia. In the upper section, it flows through the historic Carnia region, in the northern part of the province of Udine. In the middle and lower sections, it first sets the boundary between the provinces of Udine and Pordenone and later between the former and the Province of Venice. Finally, it flows into the Gulf of Venice between Lignano Sabbiadoro and Bibione.

The watershed covers an area of 2,916 square kilometres (1,126 mi^{2}) with a population of approximately 165,000. The watershed lies almost entirely in Carnia and the other mountain valleys of Friuli. 86.5% of the watershed is in the Province of Udine.

The main towns along its banks are Latisana and San Michele al Tagliamento. In the vicinity of the river are the following towns: Tolmezzo, Gemona del Friuli, San Daniele del Friuli, Spilimbergo, Casarsa della Delizia, Codroipo, San Vito al Tagliamento, Pinzano al Tagliamento.

== Course ==
The source is at an elevation of 1,195 metres (3,921 ft) in the Veneto region (Lorenzago di Cadore) in the Province of Belluno near the border with the Province of Udine, north-west of Forni di Sopra close to the Mauria Pass. Initially, the river's course is in a west to east direction, parallel to the Carnic Alps range. The first tributary of note is the Lumiei, which enters the Tagliamento from the left at a distance of 26 kilometres (16 mi) from the source.

The river passes through Pinzano and courses in a southward direction, while spreading across the plain reaching a width of 3 kilometres (1.9 mi) near Spilimbergo and splitting into a number of branches. Its gravelly bed is very permeable, and it absorbs almost all its waters, but the river recovers most of the flow downstream of Codroipo and Casarsa, thanks to abundant flows from underground rivers. From here onwards, the river bed distinctly narrows to 180 metres (590 ft) and starts to meander because of the reduced slope. Before ending its course, the river receives the waters of a small underground river, the Varmo. Finally, the river flows into the Adriatic Sea between Lignano and Bibione.

== In literature ==
The Tagliamento river appears in A Farewell to Arms (1929) by Ernest Hemingway. During the Italian retreat after the Battle of Caporetto, Lieutenant Frederic Henry enters the river to avoid arrest by the military police, giving the river a crucial role in the narrative.

== Names ==
In addition to the Italian name Tagliamento, the river is known by different names in other languages of the region. The Standard Friulian name for the river is Tiliment; other local variants include Taiament, Tilimint, Tiument, Timent, and Tuement. In Venetian, the river is known as Tajamento; in Slovene, as Tilment; and in Latin, as Tiliaventum or Taliamentum. It was known as Dülmende in German during the Middle Ages.

== See also ==
- Lake Ospedaletto
