= 5th Army Corps Auto Group "Postumia" =

Inactive Italian Army transport unit

- 5° Autogruppo di Corpo d'Armata "Postumia"
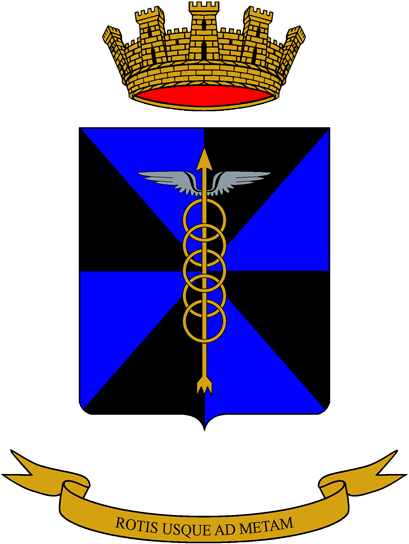
- Group coat of arms
- Active: 1 Oct. 1976 — 1 March 1983
- Country: Italy
- Branch: Italian Army
- Role: Military logistics
- Part of: 5th Army Corps
- Garrison/HQ: Treviso
- Motto: "Rotis usque ad metam"
- Anniversaries: 22 May 1916 - Battle of Asiago

Insignia
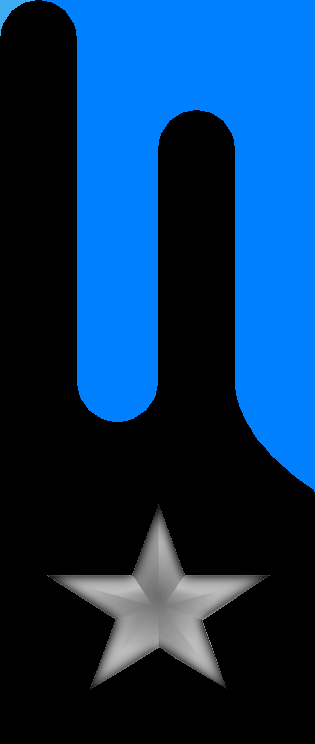
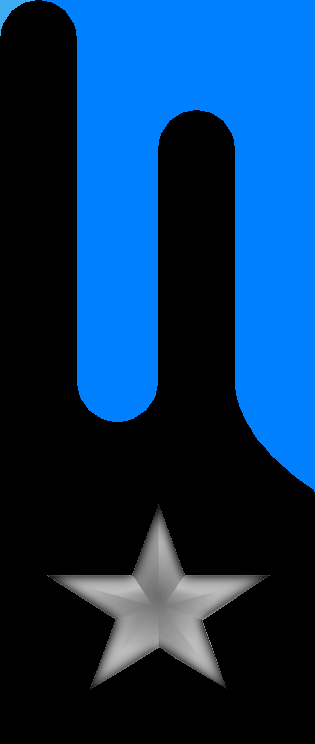
- Unit gorget patches

The 5th Army Corps Auto Group "Postumia" (Italian: 5° Autogruppo di Corpo d'Armata "Postumia") is an inactive military logistics battalion of the Italian Army, which was based in Treviso in Veneto. Originally a transport regiment of the Royal Italian Army, the unit was last active from 1976 to 1983. The group's anniversary falls, as for all units of the Italian Army's Transport and Materiel Corps, on 22 May, the anniversary of the Royal Italian Army's first major use of automobiles to transport reinforcements to the Asiago plateau to counter the Austro-Hungarian Asiago Offensive in May 1916.

== History ==
=== Interwar years ===
In August 1920, the V Automobilistic Center was formed in Trieste and assigned to the V Army Corps. In 1923, the center was disbanded and its personnel and materiel used to form the V Auto Grouping, which consisted of a command, an auto group, a railway group, and a depot. On 24 October 1926, the grouping was disbanded and the next day its personnel and vehicles were used to form the 5th Automobilistic Center. The center consisted of a command, the V Automobilistic Group, and a depot. The three companies of the disbanded railway group were assigned to the 4th Field Artillery Regiment, 6th Field Artillery Regiment, and 23rd Field Artillery Regiment.

In 1935-36, the center mobilized 23 officers and more than 1,000 troops to augment units deployed for the Second Italo-Ethiopian War.

=== World War II ===
On 1 July 1942, the 5th Automobilistic Center was renamed 5th Drivers Regiment. In the evening of 8 September 1943, the Armistice of Cassibile, which ended hostilities between the Kingdom of Italy and the Anglo-American Allies, was announced by General Dwight D. Eisenhower on Radio Algiers and by Marshal Pietro Badoglio on Italian radio. Germany reacted by invading Italy and the 5th Drivers Regiment was disbanded soon thereafter by German forces. During World War II the center mobilized in its depot in Trieste among others the following units:

- LVIII Heavy Auto Group
- 51st Heavy Mobile Workshop
- 61st Heavy Mobile Workshop

=== Cold War ===
On 1 April 1947, the 5th Drivers Center was formed in Treviso, which consisted of a command, the 5th Auto Unit, the 5th Vehicles Park, a fuel depot, and a depot. The center supported the V Territorial Military Command of the Northeastern Military Region. The unit was tasked with the transport of fuel, ammunition, and materiel between the military region's depots and the logistic supply points of the army's divisions and brigades. On 15 May 1948, the center added the newly formed V Auto Group in Padua, which incorporated the center's 5th Auto Unit. On 1 March 1949, the 5th Vehicles Park was transferred to the 5th Automotive Repair Shop.

On 1 May 1952, the V Territorial Military Command was reorganized as V Army Corps. On 1 October of the same year, the V Auto Group became an autonomous unit, was renamed V Army Corps Auto Group, and assigned to the V Army Corps. On 10 March 1955, the group moved from Padua to Treviso. On 1 October 1956, the group added the 3rd Auto Unit and, on 1 October 1962, the 4th Auto Unit. On 10 November 1962, the V Army Corps Auto Group was assigned to the Service Units Command of the V Army Corps. At the time the group consisted of a command, the 1st Mixed Auto Unit, the 2nd Mixed Auto Unit, the 3rd Mixed Auto Unit, the 4th Mixed Auto Unit, the 5th Mixed Auto Unit, and a light workshop. On 31 December 1964, the 5th Drivers Center was disbanded.

On 1 October 1976, as part of the 1975 army reform, the V Army Corps Auto Group was renamed 5th Army Corps Auto Group "Postumia". Like all Italian Army transport units the battalion was named for a historic road near its base, in case of the 5th Army Corps Auto Group for the Roman road Via Postumia, which connected Genoa and Aquileia. The group consisted of a command, a command unit, the 1st and 2nd mixed auto units in Treviso, and the 3rd and 4th mixed auto units in Palazzolo dello Stella.

On 12 November 1976, the President of the Italian Republic Giovanni Leone granted with decree 846 the group a flag and assigned the group the traditions of the 5th Drivers Regiment.

In January 1983, the group transferred the 3rd Mixed Auto Unit and 4th Mixed Auto Unit in Palazzolo dello Stella to the 13th Maneuver Logistic Battalion. Upon entering the battalion, the two units were reorganized into a medium transport company and a mixed transport company. On 1 March 1983, the group transferred the 1st Mixed Auto Unit and 2nd Mixed Auto Unit in Treviso to the 5th Maneuver Logistic Battalion in Pordenone. The two units were also reorganized into a medium transport company and a mixed transport company. On the same day, 1 March 1983, the 5th Army Corps Auto Group "Postumia" was disbanded. Two days later, on 3 March 1983, the group's flag was transferred to the Shrine of the Flags in the Vittoriano in Rome for safekeeping.

== See also ==
- Military logistics
