= 13th Logistic Battalion "Aquileia" =

Inactive Italian Army brigade logistics unit

- 13° Battaglione Logistico "Aquileia"
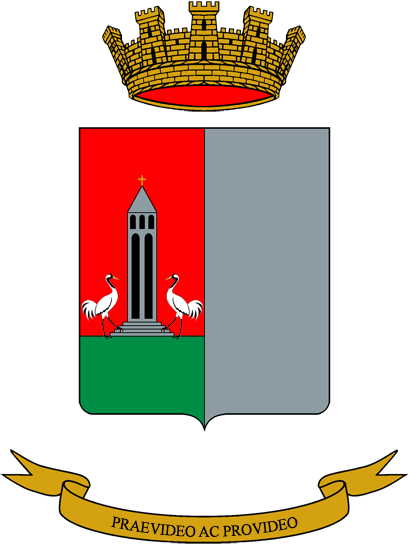
- Battalion coat of arms
- Active: 1 Jan. 1982 — 30 Nov. 1991
- Country: Italy
- Branch: Italian Army
- Type: Military logistics
- Part of: 3rd Missile Brigade "Aquileia"
- Garrison/HQ: Portogruaro
- Motto(s): "Praevideo ac provideo"
- Anniversaries: 22 May 1916 - Battle of Asiago

Insignia
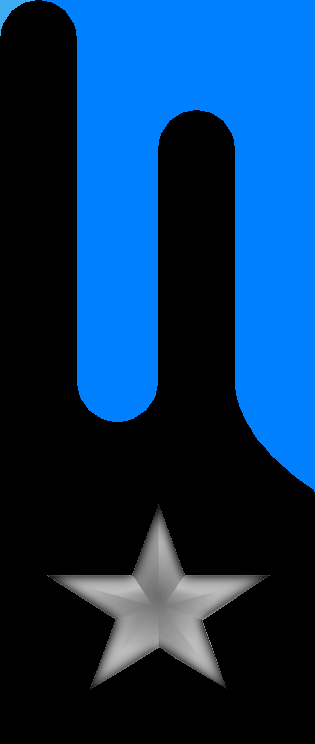
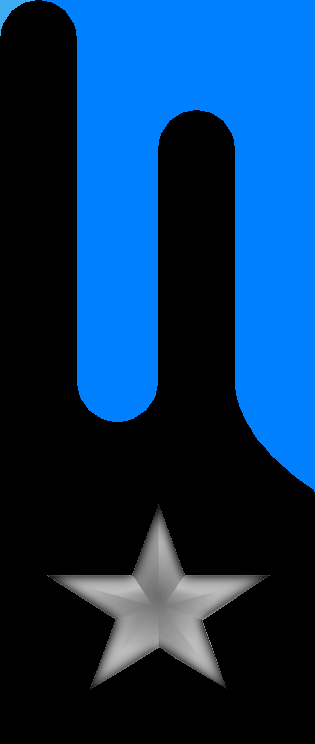
- Unit gorget patches

The 13th Logistic Battalion "Aquileia" (Italian: 13° Battaglione Logistico "Aquileia") is an inactive military logistics battalion of the Italian Army, which was assigned to the 3rd Missile Brigade "Aquileia". The battalion's anniversary falls, as for all units of the Italian Army's Transport and Materiel Corps, on 22 May, the anniversary of the Royal Italian Army's first major use of automobiles to transport reinforcements to the Asiago plateau to counter the Austro-Hungarian Asiago Offensive in May 1916.

== History ==
=== Cold War ===
On 1 January 1982, the 13th Maneuver Logistic Battalion was formed in Portogruaro with the personnel and materiel of the disbanded XIII Resupply, Repairs, Recovery Unit of the 3rd Missile Brigade "Aquileia".

Initially the battalion consisted of a command, a command and services company, a supply company, a maintenance company, and a special transport platoon. In January 1983, the battalion received the 3rd Mixed Auto Unit and 4th Mixed Auto Unit from the 5th Army Corps Auto Group "Postumia". The two auto units were reorganized into a medium transport company and a mixed transport company, which were both assigned to the battalion and based in Palazzolo dello Stella.

On 1 December 1988, the 13th Maneuver Logistic Battalion was renamed 13th Logistic Battalion "Aquileia" and consisted afterwards of the following units:

- 13th Logistic Battalion "Aquileia", in Portogruaro
  - Command and Services Company
  - Supply Company
  - Maintenance Company
  - Medium Transport Company, in Palazzolo dello Stella
  - Mixed Transport Company, Palazzolo dello Stella
  - Special Transport Platoon (for nuclear warheads)

=== Recent times ===
After the end of the Cold War the Italian Army began to draw down its forces. Consequently, on 30 November 1991, the 3rd Missile Brigade "Aquileia" and the 13th Logistic Battalion "Aquileia" were disbanded. On 5 December of the same year, the battalion's flag was transferred to the Shrine of the Flags in the Vittoriano in Rome for safekeeping.

== See also ==
- Military logistics
