= Mauria Pass =

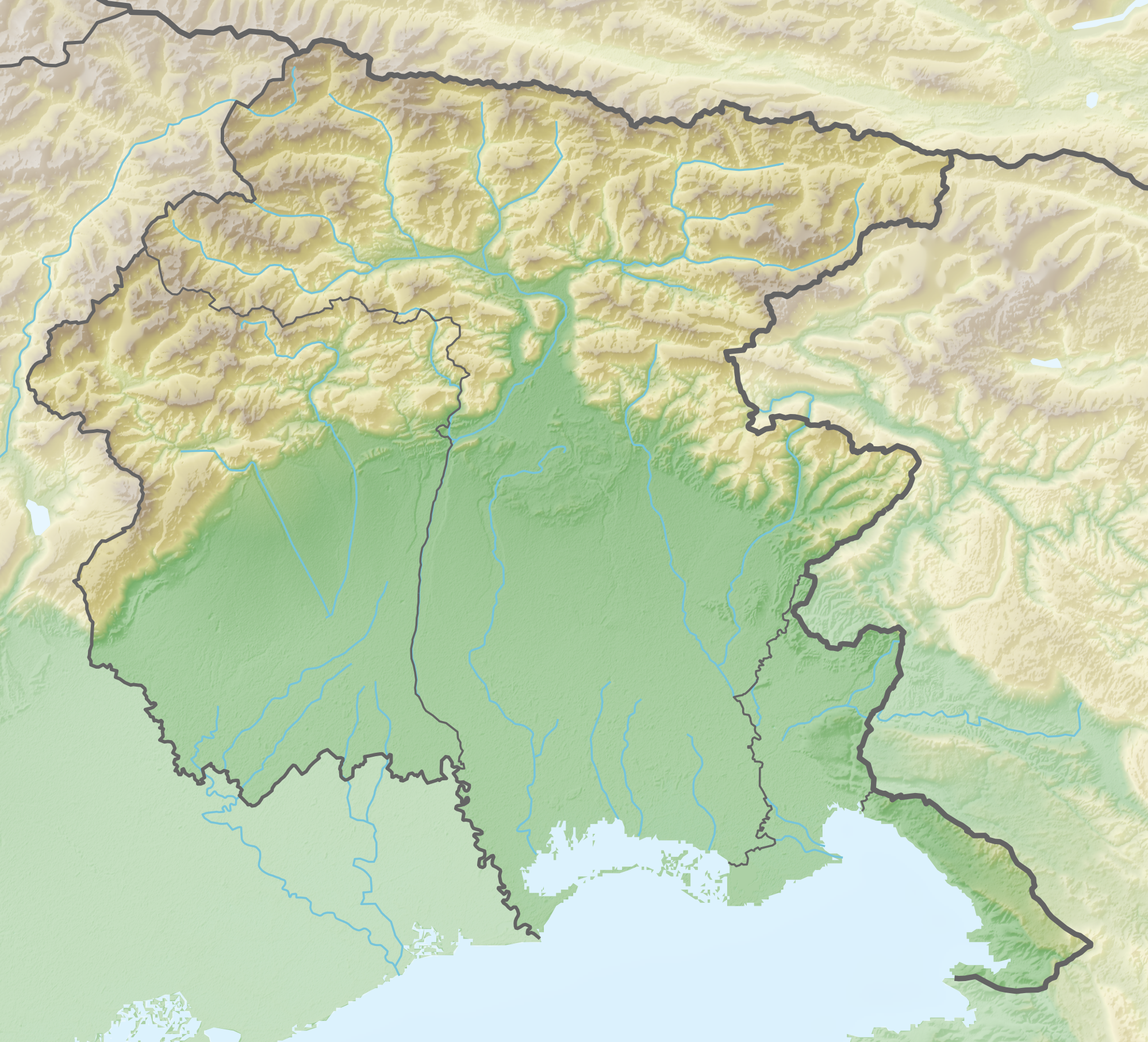
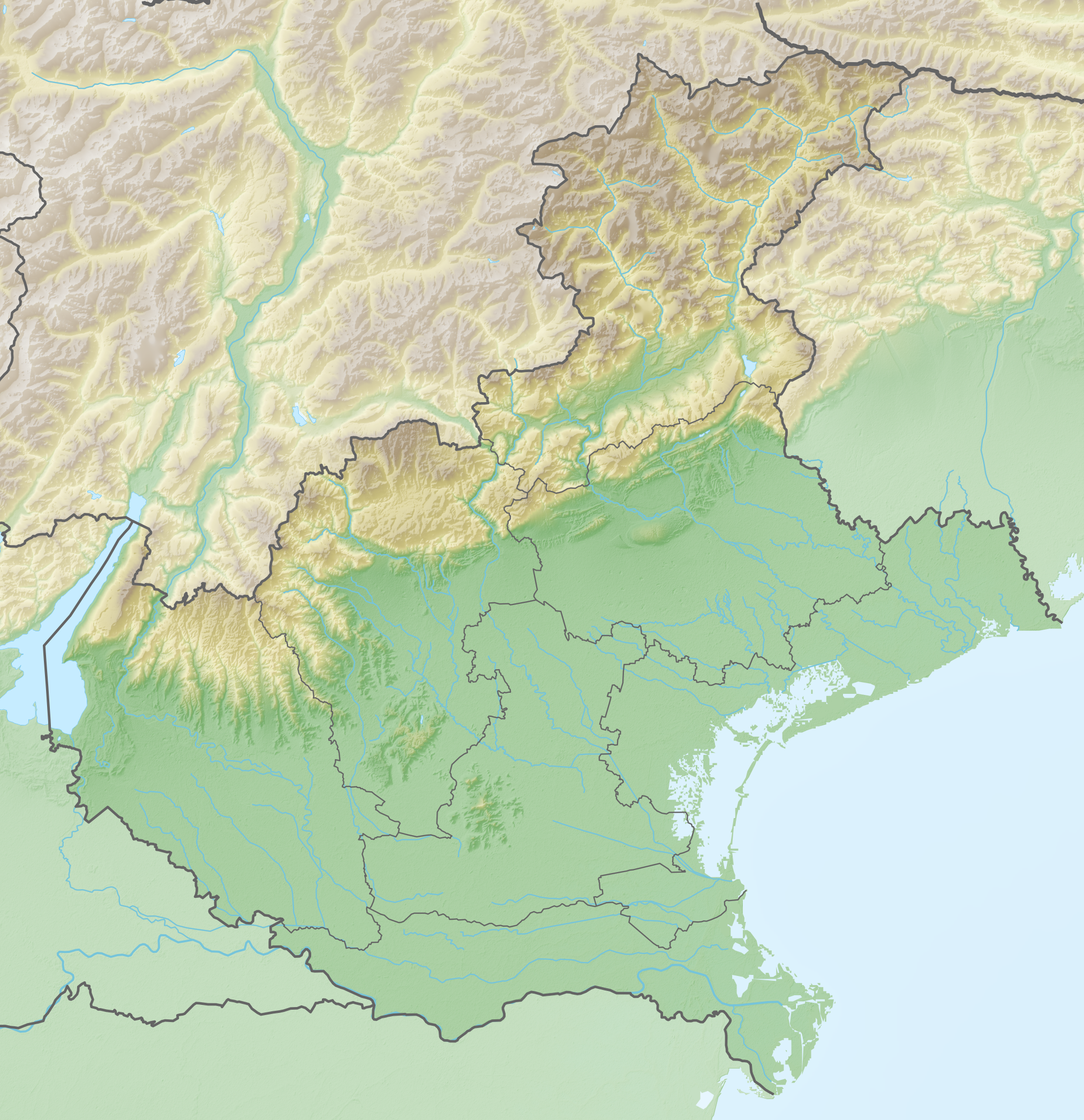
- Location within Alps Location within Friuli-Venezia Giulia Location within Veneto
- Elevation: 1,298 metres (4,259 ft)

Third Approach
- Location: Veneto/Friuli, Italy
- Coordinates: 46°27′16″N 12°30′48″E

The Mauria Pass (Italian: Passo della Mauria) (1298 m) is a high mountain pass between the regions of Veneto and Friuli in Italy. It connects Lorenzago di Cadore in Veneto and Forni di Sopra in Friuli. The pass road, the SS 52, has a maximum grade of 10%. Normally, the pass is open year-round. At the summit, there is a restaurant. Although this is an important east-west artery, the pass road is quite narrow. Near the pass to the south is the source of the Tagliamento.

== See also ==
- List of highest paved roads in Europe
- List of mountain passes
