= Veliki Hrib =

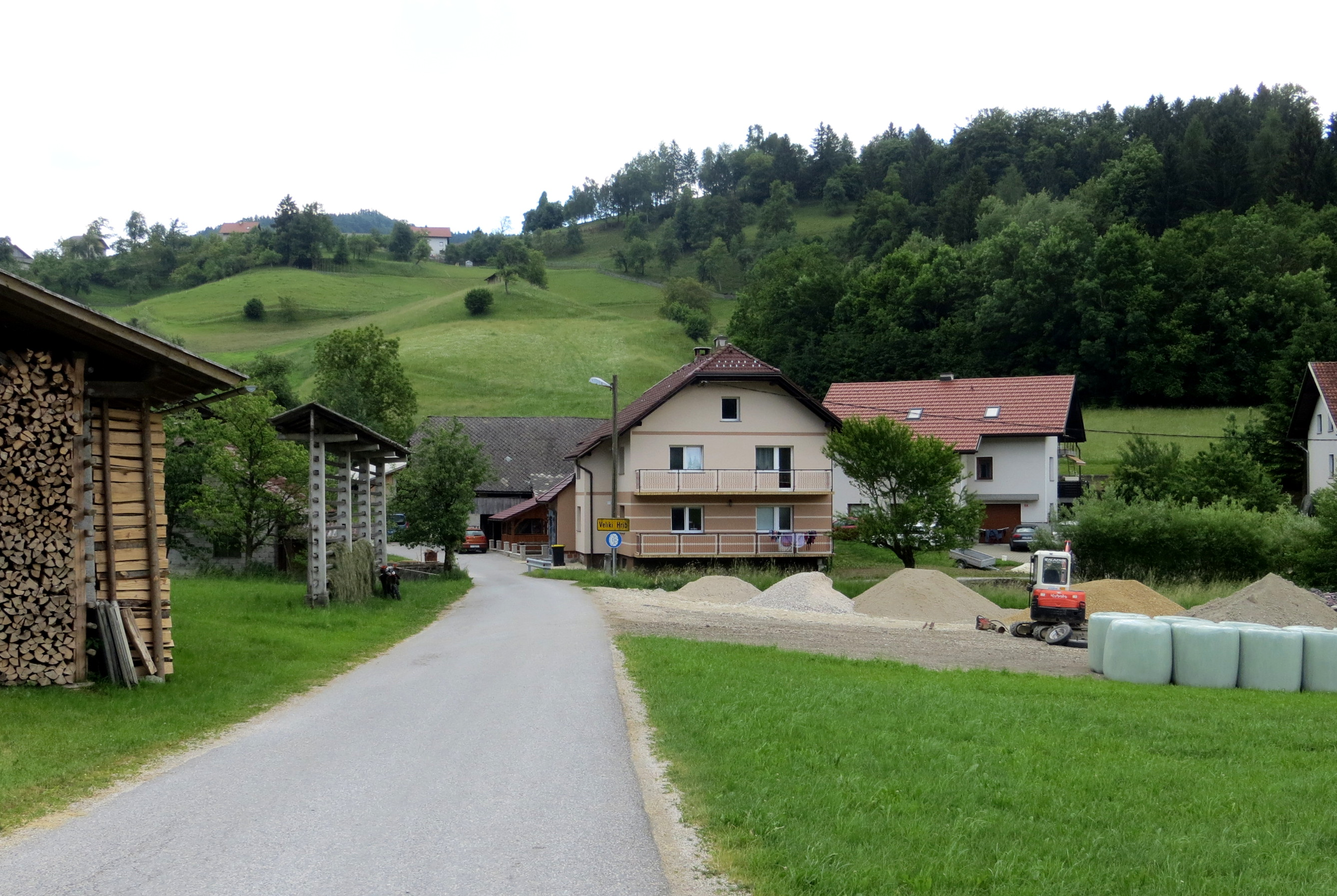

- Location in Slovenia
- Coordinates: 46°13′0.51″N 14°46′45.83″E
- Country: Slovenia
- Traditional region: Upper Carniola
- Statistical region: Central Slovenia
- Municipality: Kamnik

Area
  - Total: 1.5 km^{2} (0.58 sq mi)
- Elevation: 591.9 m (1,942 ft)

Population (2002)
  - Total: 77

Veliki Hrib (pronounced [ˈʋeːliki ˈxɾiːp]; German: Großhrib) is a dispersed settlement on an elevation on the left bank of the Nevljica River in the Tuhinj Valley in the Upper Carniola region of Slovenia.

== Notable people ==
Notable people that were born or lived in Veliki Hrib include the following:

- Ladislav Hrovat (1825–1902), linguist and translator
