= Reana del Rojale =

Reana del Rojale Reane dal Roiâl (Friulian)
- Comune
- Comune di Reana del Rojale
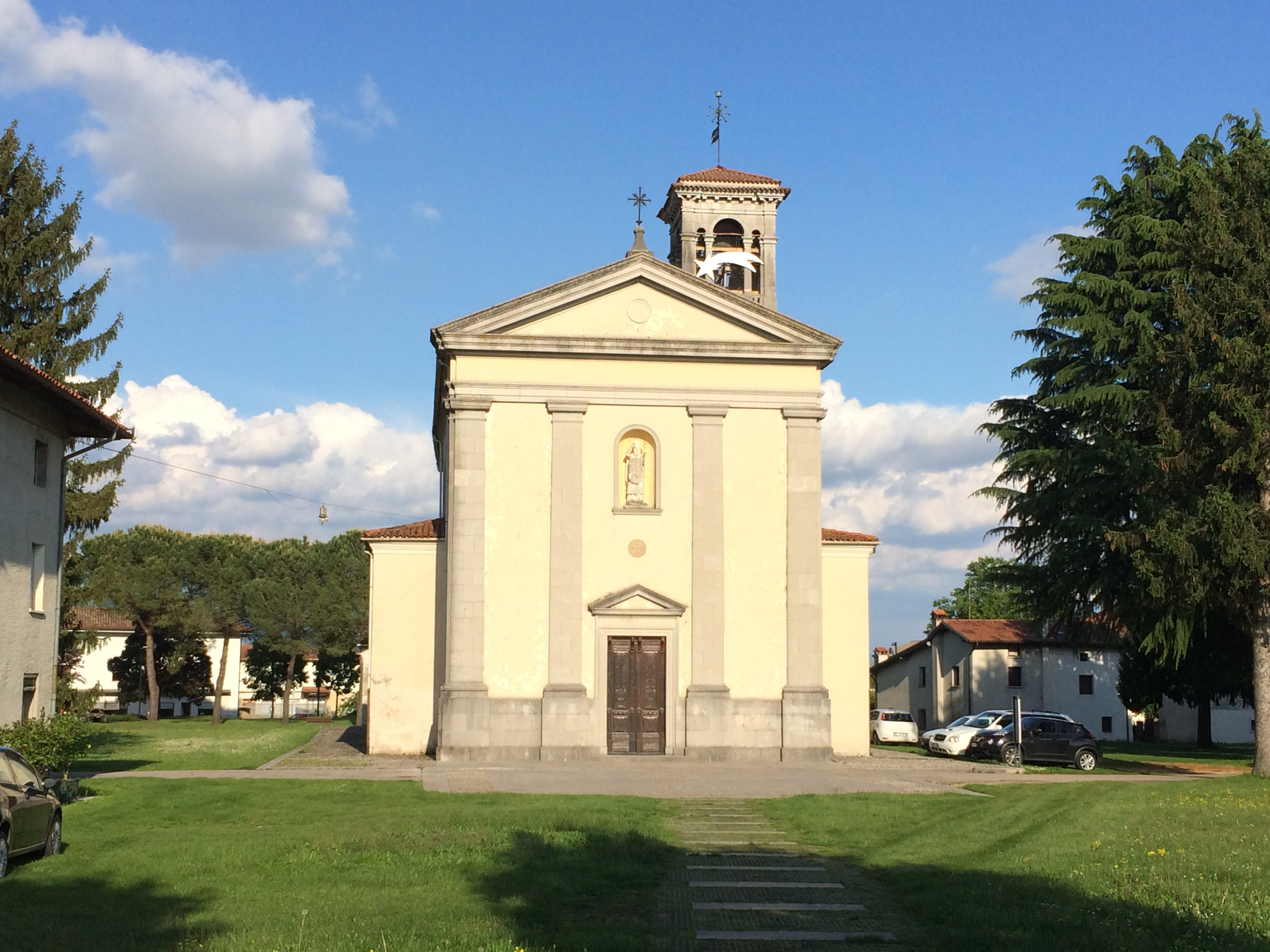
- San Felice Church

- Location within Italy Location within Friuli-Venezia Giulia
- Coordinates: 46°9′N 13°14′E
- Country: Italy
- Region: Friuli-Venezia Giulia
- Province: Udine (UD)
- Frazioni: Cortale, Qualso, Reana, Remugnano, Ribis, Rizzolo, Valle, Vergnacco, Zompitta

Government
  - Mayor: Edi Colaoni

Area
  - Total: 20.2 km^{2} (7.8 sq mi)
- Elevation: 168 m (551 ft)

Population (31 December 2008)
  - Total: 5,010
  - Density: 248/km^{2} (642/sq mi)
- Demonym: Reanesi
- Time zone: UTC+1 (CET)
  - Summer (DST): UTC+2 (CEST)
- Postal code: 33010
- Dialing code: 0432
- Website: Official website

Reana del Rojale (Friulian: Reane dal Roiâl) is a comune (municipality) in the Regional decentralization entity of Udine in the Italian region of Friuli-Venezia Giulia, located about 70 kilometres (43 mi) northwest of Trieste and about 9 kilometres (6 mi) north of Udine.

== Twin towns ==
Reana del Rojale is twinned with:

- Križevci, Croatia
- Salagnon, France
