= San Michele al Tagliamento =

- Comune
- Comune di San Michele al Tagliamento
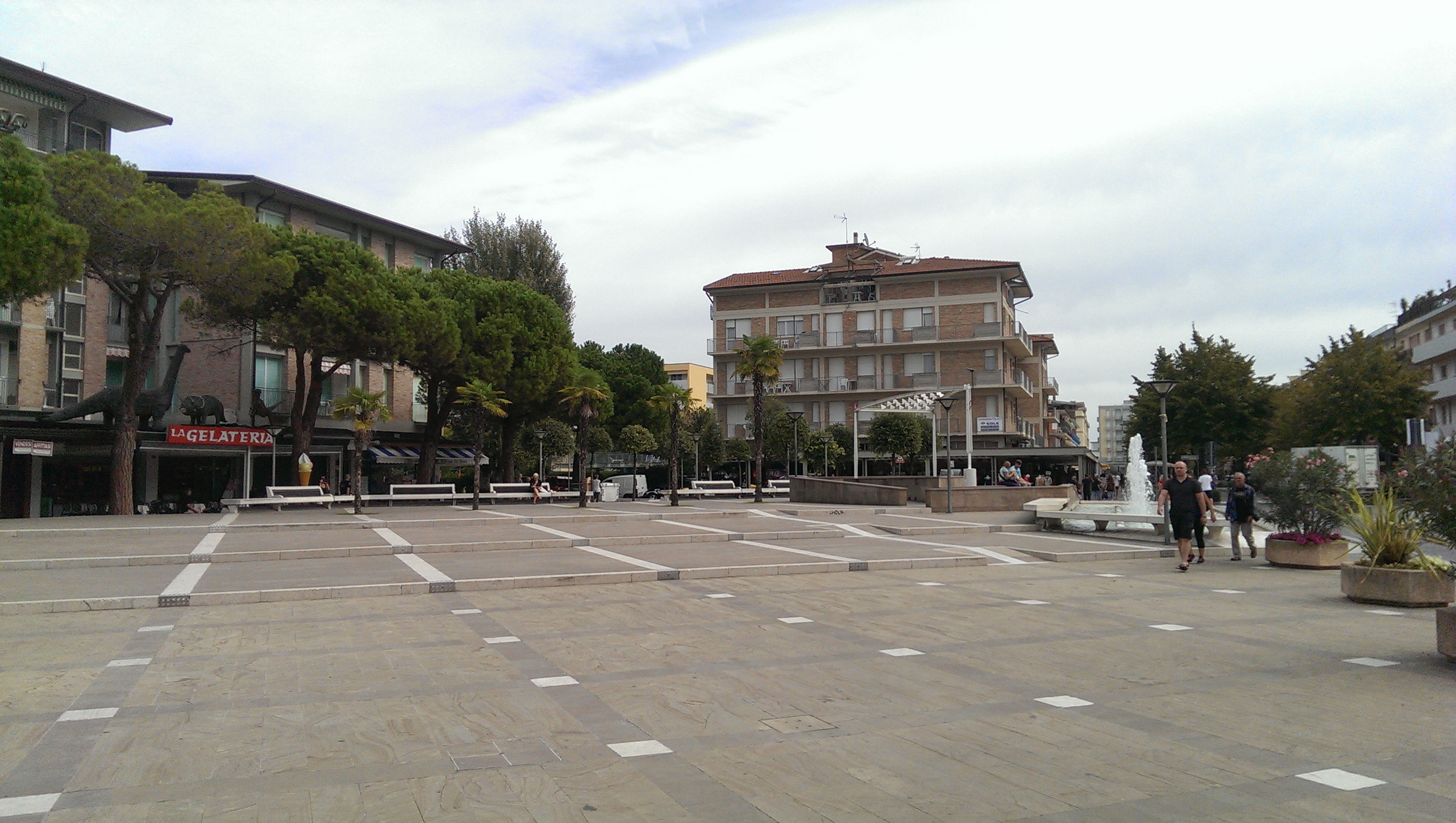

- Coat of arms

- Location within Italy Location within Veneto
- Coordinates: 45°45′49″N 12°59′43″E
- Country: Italy
- Region: Veneto
- Metropolitan city: Venice (VE)
- Frazioni: Bevazzana, Bibione, Cesarolo, Pozzi, San Giorgio al Tagliamento, III Bacino, Villanova-Malafesta Località: Marinella, San Filippo

Government
  - Mayor: Flavio Maurutto

Area
  - Total: 112.3 km^{2} (43.4 sq mi)
- Elevation: 7 m (23 ft)

Population (31 January 2009)
  - Total: 11,908
  - Density: 106.0/km^{2} (274.6/sq mi)
- Demonym: Sanmichelini
- Time zone: UTC+1 (CET)
  - Summer (DST): UTC+2 (CEST)
- Postal code: 30028
- Dialing code: 0431
- Patron saint: Madonna della Salute
- Saint day: 21 November
- Website: Official website

San Michele al Tagliamento is an Italian Municipality with 11,930 inhabitants in the Metropolitan City of Venice, Veneto, Italy.

SS14, one of the main state highways in Italy, passes through the commune, whose frazione of Bibione is a popular tourist resort.

The neighboring municipalities are Caorle, Fossalta di Portogruaro, Latisana, Lignano Sabbiadoro, Morsano al Tagliamento, Portogruaro, Ronchis and Varmo.

== History ==
The first traces of human settlement date back to the 4th and 3rd centuries BC, when the area (now part of the municipality of San Michele al Tagliamento) was populated by the Adriatic Veneti.

From 181 AC onward, the Roman colonization marked the beginning of the land reclamation and agricultural development of the entire area. Since the end of the 18th century, archaeological excavations have led to the discovery of black and white mosaic floors, copper coins, glass fragments and pottery, which can be traced back to the Roman imperial period.
