= Bibione =

- Frazione
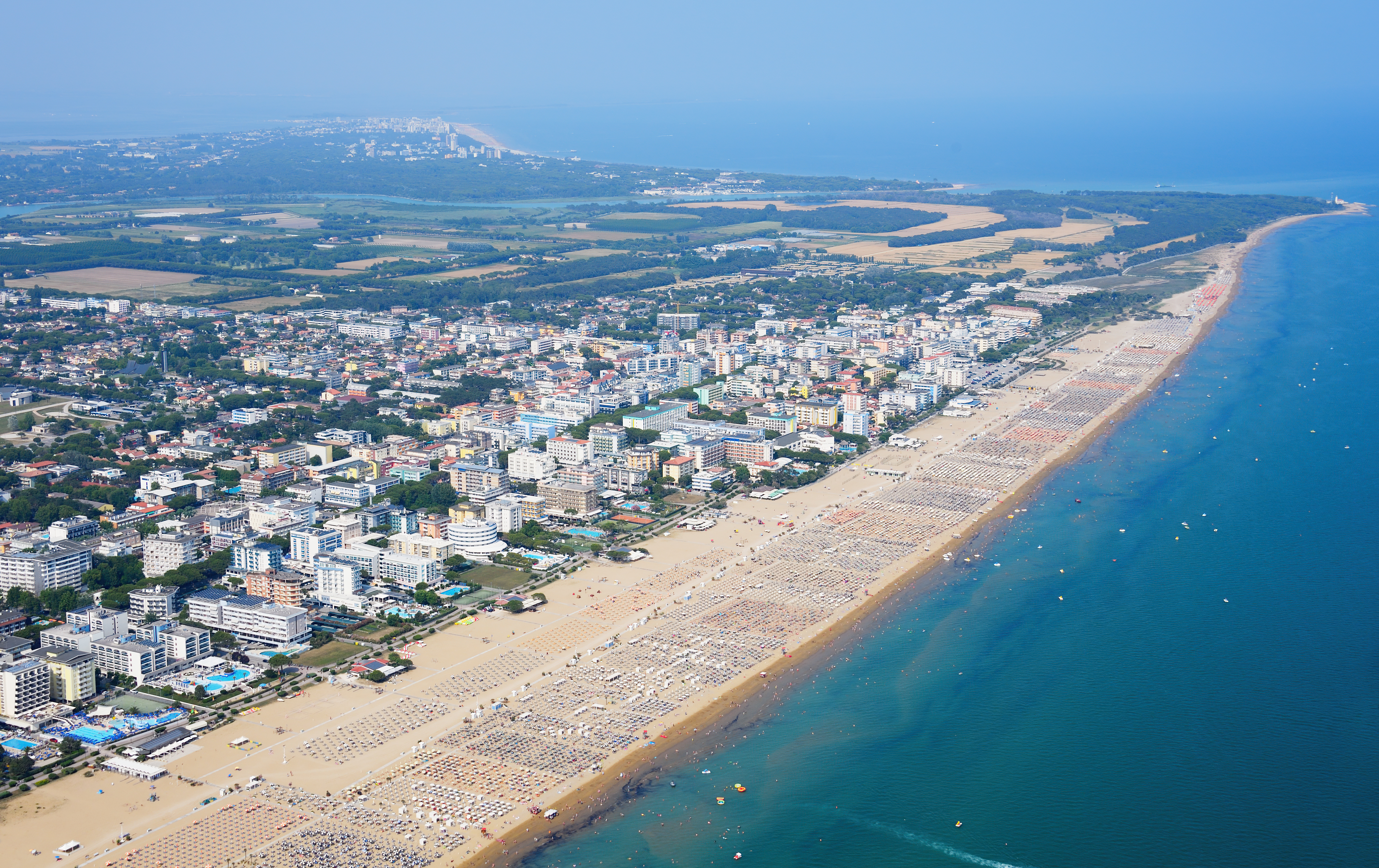
- Aerial view of Bibione

- Location of Bibione in Italy
- Coordinates: 45°38′09″N 13°03′14″E
- Country: Italy
- Region: Veneto
- Metropolitan city: Venice
- Comune: San Michele al Tagliamento

Area
  - Total: 28.4 km^{2} (11.0 sq mi)
- Elevation: 1 m (3.3 ft)

Population (2017)
  - Total: 2,564
  - Density: 90.3/km^{2} (234/sq mi)
- Demonym: Bibionesi
- Time zone: UTC+1 (CET)
  - Summer (DST): UTC+2 (CEST)
- Postal code: 30028
- Dialing code: 0431
- Patron saint: Assumption of Mary15 August
- Website: Official website

Bibione is a frazione of the comune of San Michele al Tagliamento, in the Metropolitan City of Venice, Veneto, northern Italy. It is a seaside resort, particularly popular among German, Austrian, Hungarian, Czech, Polish, and Slovak tourists.

The city offers around 100,000 beds, whether in hotels, holiday apartments or on campsites. Bibione is mostly visited between May and September, since this is the most suitable period to bathe. Many shops and beach facilities are open only during the summer season. Traditionally, a weekly market takes place every Tuesday on the square in front of the funfair.

== Geography ==
Bibione faces the Adriatic Sea, and occupies a peninsula situated between the Lugugnana canal and the river Tagliamento. Given the soil consistency and on the basis of some excavations, it can be assumed that Bibione originally consisted of a small group of islands. These were connected to the mainland and the lagoon by a narrow stretch of land, mentioned in several Roman and medieval documents as insulae bibioni or Bibiones.

== History ==
After the fall of the Western Roman Empire, Bibione fell under the suzerainty of the bishops of Concordia. Over the following centuries, the islands were neglected and pinewoods spread over the whole area. The actual land reclamation started at the beginning of the 20th century, when drainage canals and embankments were built. When the works ended, around 1950, Bibione was left with its pine forests and its sandy beach. In the following years, the first holiday accommodation was built and Bibione became a tourist resort.

== Tourism ==
Tourists come largely from Germany and Austria, but also from Italy, Eastern European countries and other parts of Europe (depending on the season and on the town district preferred). The cityscape is characterized by numerous hotels, guest houses and campsites, which provide a total number of beds that is forty times higher than the number of inhabitants. The centre of Bibione houses Corso Europa and other large streets filled with cafés, shops, restaurants and even arcades.

Bibione is divided into different areas: Lido dei Pini, Bibione Pineda, Bibione Spiaggia and Lido del Sole. In summer 2014, a smoking ban was imposed on the area between the shore and the first row of beach umbrellas and Bibione thus became Italy's first smoke-free beach. Since 2019 smoking is banned at the complete beach, except dedicated smoking areas.

Since 2024 Bibione has hosted the annual Bibione Sand Storm, part of the FIM Sand Races World Championship.
