= 1st Heavy Artillery Regiment (Italy) =

Inactive Italian Army nuclear artillery unit

- 1° Reggimento Artiglieria Pesante
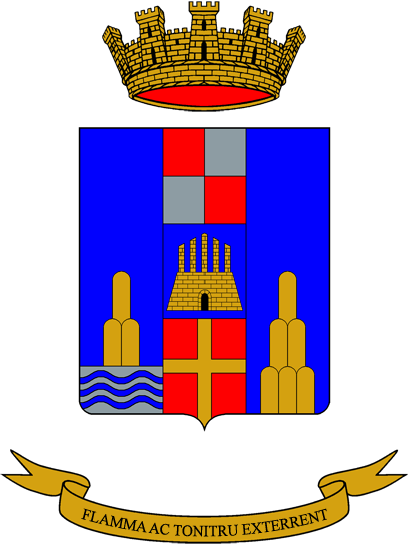
- Regimental coat of arms
- Active: 1 Nov. 1902 — 8 Sept. 1943; 1 Oct. 1975 — 31 July 1983
- Country: Italy
- Branch: Italian Army
- Part of: 3rd Missile Brigade "Aquileia"
- Garrison/HQ: Elvas
- Motto(s): "Flamma ac tonitru exterrent"
- Anniversaries: 15 June 1918 - Second Battle of the Piave River

Insignia
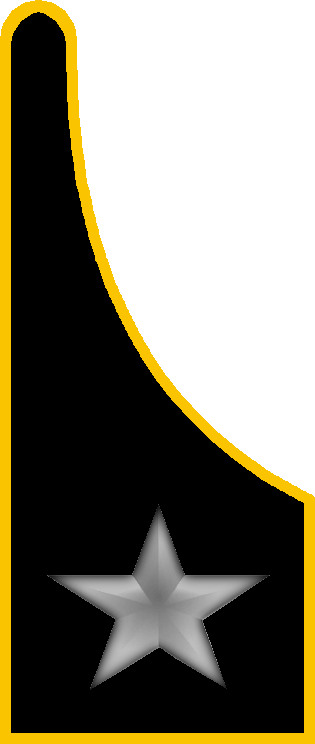
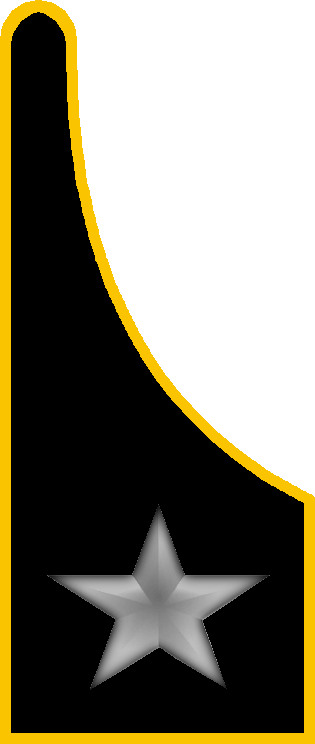
- Regimental gorget patches

The 1st Heavy Artillery Regiment (Italian: 1° Reggimento Artiglieria Pesante) is an inactive heavy artillery regiment of the Italian Army, which was based in Elvas in South Tyrol. Originally an artillery regiment of the Royal Italian Army, the regiment was formed in 1902 with pre-existing batteries. During World War I the regiment's groups and batteries fought on the Italian front. In World War II the regiment formed two army artillery groupings, which participated in 1940 in the invasion of France and in 1941 in the invasion of Yugoslavia. The regiment and its groupings were disbanded by invading German forces after the announcement of the Armistice of Cassibile on 8 September 1943.

In 1975 the XIV Heavy Artillery Group in Elvas was renamed 1st Heavy Artillery Group "Adige" and assigned the flag and traditions of the 1st Heavy Artillery Regiment. The group was assigned to the 3rd Missile Brigade "Aquileia", which consisted of the Italian Army's units with a nuclear weapons mission. The group was armed with M115 203mm howitzers, for which the US Army's 11th Field Artillery Detachment, which was part of the 559th Artillery Group, stored W33 and later W79 nuclear artillery shells at Site Rigel in Natz-Schabs. In 1983 the group was disbanded and the group's 8th Battery was transferred to the 9th Heavy Artillery Group "Rovigo". The regimental anniversary falls, as for all Italian Army artillery regiments, on June 15, the beginning of the Second Battle of the Piave River in 1918.

This article is about the Royal Italian Army's 1st Heavy Artillery Regiment, which was a support unit assigned to an army-level command. This regiment is unrelated to the 1st Heavy Field Artillery Regiment, which was a support unit assigned to a corps-level command, and unrelated to the 1st Field Artillery Regiment, which was a support unit assigned to a division-level command.

== History ==
On 1 November 1902 the 4th, 6th, 7th, and 8th fortress brigades, as well as the 16th, 17th, and 24th fortress companies, were combined to form the 1st Fortress Artillery Regiment in Turin. The new regiment consisted of a staff, five brigades, and depot. Of the companies that made up the new regiment, the 4th Company had participated in 1855-56 in the Crimean War, while the 1st Company had fought in 1859 in the Second Italian War of Independence, and the 10th Company in 1866 the Third Italian War of Independence. All three companies had also participated in 1860-61 in the Piedmontese invasion of Central and Southern Italy and fought in the Siege of Gaeta. In March 1896 troops drawn from eight companies deployed to Eritrea, where they formed four batteries for the First Italo-Ethiopian War.

On 17 July 1910 the brigades of the regiment were redesignated as groups. The same year the regiment ceded six companies to help form the 5th Fortress Artillery Regiment, 8th Fortress Artillery Regiment, and 9th Fortress Artillery Regiment. As a consequence of the expansion of the number of fortress artillery regiments the 1st Fortress Artillery Regiment was renumbered 6th Fortress Artillery Regiment. To replace the ceded companies the regiment formed two new companies and consisted by the end of the year of a staff, a depot, and three groups with a combined ten companies. During the Italo-Turkish War in 1911-12 the regiment's 6th, 8th, and 10th companies were deployed to Libya. In 1912 the regiment formed three new companies, one of which was ceded to the 9th Fortress Artillery Regiment the same year.

=== World War I ===
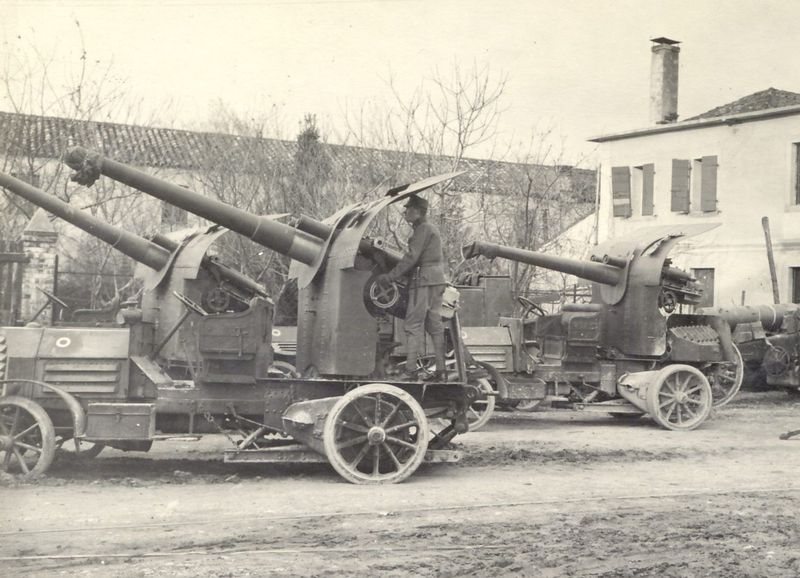
Austro-Hungarian troops with abandoned 102/35 anti-aircraft cannons on SPA 9000 trucks after the Battle of Caporetto

At the outbreak of World War I the regiment consisted of three groups, which consisted of four batteries each. During the war the regiment's groups and batteries, as well as the units formed by the regiment's depot in Turin, participated in all major battles of the Italian front. The regimental depot formed the commands of the 11th, 19th, 20th, 21st, 44th, 45th, 49th, 52nd, 53rd, 54th, 56th, 62nd, 67th, and 75th siege groupings and the commands of 34 siege groups: XXXV, LXI, LXX, XCVII, CI, CII, CIV, CXIX, CXXIII, CXXIV, CXXVII, CXXVIII, CXXIX, CXXX, CXXXI, CXXXII CXXXVI, CXL, CLIII, CLXI, CLXVII, CLXXV, CXCI, CXCII, CXCIII, CXCVIII, CCIII, CCIV, CCV, CCVI, CCVII, CCVIII, CCXXIII, and CCXXXVIII. For these groups and siege groups formed by other regiments the depot formed 87 siege batteries. The depot also formed the commands of the I and III cannon groups, which operated 102/35 anti-aircraft cannons mounted on SPA 9000 trucks. Each of the two groups fielded three batteries with four 102/35 anti-aircraft cannons per battery.

After the war the groups and batteries formed during the war were disbanded. On 1 March 1920 the army's artillery was reorganized again and the regiment was renamed 1st Heavy Artillery Regiment. By January 1923 the regiment consisted of a command and four groups, which fielded a mix of cannons, howitzers, and mortars. On 1 July of the same year the regiment transferred its IV Group to the 2nd Heavy Artillery Regiment.

On 10 November 1926 the regiment added two new groups: the IV Group, which had been the I Group of the 4th Heavy Artillery Regiment, and the V Group, which had been the IV Group of the 5th Heavy Artillery Regiment. In October 1934 the regiment was renamed 1st Army Artillery Regiment and in December of the same year the regiment was reduced to four groups, as the regiment's I and IV groups were used to form a School Group for the Complement Officers School in Moncalieri. In 1935-36 the regiment's depot formed the command of a grouping and the command of a group, as well as four batteries for the Second Italo-Ethiopian War.

=== World War II ===
At the outbreak of World War II the regiment consisted of a command and four groups. During the war the regiment's depot in Turin formed and mobilized the following unit commands:

- 1st Army Artillery Grouping
- 6th Army Artillery Grouping
- 43rd Army Corps Artillery Grouping (mobilized in July 1943 for the XXX Army Corps)
- I Cannons Group with 149/35 heavy guns
- II Cannons Group with 149/35 heavy guns
- III Cannons Group with 149/35 heavy guns
- IV Cannons Group with 149/35 heavy guns
- V Cannons Group with 149/35 heavy guns
- VI Cannons Group with 149/35 heavy guns
- XXXIV Cannons Group with 149/40 mod. 35 heavy guns
- XXXVI Cannons Group with 149/40 mod. 35 heavy guns
- LXI Howitzers Group with 152/13 howitzers
- LXII Howitzers Group with 152/13 howitzers
- LXXXI Mortars Group with 210/8 siege mortars
- LXXXII Mortars Group with 210/8 siege mortars
- CCCLXI Howitzers Group with 149/19 heavy howitzers
- CCCLXII Howitzers Group with 149/19 heavy howitzers
- LII Position Anti-aircraft Group with 75/27 mod. 06 field guns
- I Bombards Group with 240/12 L trench mortars
- V Bombards Group with 240/12 L trench mortars
- 1st Tractors Grouping and I Tractors Group

The regiment's depot also formed and mobilized the batteries for the group commands. The groups operated either under command of army artillery groupings or as autonomous units. The depot was disbanded by invading German forces after the announcement of the Armistice of Cassibile on 8 September 1943.

- 1st Army Artillery Grouping: the grouping was ordered to be formed on 2 September 1939. On 10 June 1940, the day Italy entered World War II, the grouping consisted of a command, command unit, the V Cannons Group with 149/35 heavy guns and the XLV Guardia alla Frontiera Group with 105/14 mod. 14 howitzers. The grouping was then reinforced with the XXIV Group with 149/35 heavy guns, which had been mobilized by the 5th Army Artillery Regiment, and the LI, LII, and LIII howitzers groups with 152/37 heavy field guns, which had been mobilized by the 4th Army Artillery Regiment. The grouping then participated in the invasion of France. In October 1940 the grouping returned to Turin and included the I and II cannons groups with 149/35 heavy guns, the LXI and LXII howitzers groups with 152/13 howitzers, and the LXXXI and LXXXII mortars groups with 210/8 siege mortars. In January 1941 the grouping was mobilized again and included now the I and II cannons groups with 149/35 heavy guns, and the LXI and LXII howitzers groups with 152/13 howitzers. The grouping then deployed to Rijeka on the border with Yugoslavia. In April 1941 the grouping participated in the invasion of Yugoslavia and afterwards returned to Turin. On 4 December 1942 the grouping, which at that time consisted only of the I and II cannons groups with 149/35 heavy guns, was attached to the 201st Coastal Division and tasked with coastal defense in the sector between Imperia and Albenga. There the grouping was disbanded by the Germans after 8 September 1943.
- 6th Army Artillery Grouping: the grouping was ordered to be formed on 2 September 1939. On 10 June 1940, the day Italy entered World War II, the grouping consisted of a command, command unit, the III and IV cannons groups with 149/35 heavy guns, the LIII Howitzers Group with 152/37 heavy field guns and the XLI Howitzers Group with 152/45 siege guns, which had both been mobilized by the 4th Army Artillery Regiment, and the LXXXVIII Mortars Group with 210/8 siege mortars, which had been mobilized by the 5th Army Artillery Regiment. Subsequently the LIII Howitzers Group was ceded to the 1st Army Artillery Grouping. The grouping then participated in the invasion of France and afterwards was demobilized. The grouping was mobilized again at the end of 1940 and deployed to the border with Yugoslavia. In April 1941 the grouping participated in the invasion of Yugoslavia and consisted at the time of the V and XI cannons groups with 149/35 heavy guns, with the XI Cannons Group having been mobilized by the 2nd Army Artillery Regiment, the LXII and LXVIII howitzers groups with 152/13 howitzers, with the LXVIII having been mobilized by the 5th Army Artillery Regiment, and the I and II bombards groups with 240/12 L trench mortars. In June 1941 the grouping returned to Turin, where it was disbanded by the Germans after 8 September 1943.

=== Cold War ===
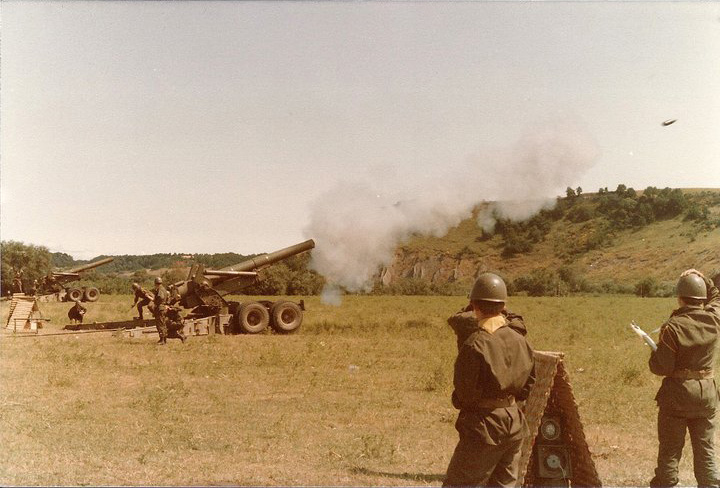
1st Heavy Artillery Group "Adige" firing its M115 203mm howitzers.

On 1 September 1962 the III Group of the 9th Heavy Artillery Regiment in Trento became an autonomous unit and was renamed XIV Heavy Artillery Group. The group was assigned to the III Missile Brigade, which consisted of the Italian Army's units with a nuclear weapons mission. The group consisted of a command, a command unit, and two batteries with M115 203mm howitzers. On 31 July 1973 the IV Missile Artillery Group of the 3rd Missile Artillery Regiment in Elvas was disbanded and the XIV Heavy Artillery Group moved from Trento into the empty base in Elvas. The W33 and later W79 nuclear artillery shells for the group were stored by the US Army's 11th Field Artillery Detachment at Site Rigel in Natz-Schabs.

During the 1975 army reform the army disbanded the regimental level and newly independent battalions and groups were granted for the first time their own flags. On 1 October 1975 the XIV Heavy Artillery Group was renamed 1st Heavy Artillery Group "Adige". The group was named for the Adige river, which flows past the unit's base. The group was assigned to the 3rd Missile Brigade "Aquileia" and consisted of the a command, a command and services battery, and the 7th and 8th batteries, which both fielded four M115 203mm howitzers. At the time the group fielded 450 men (31 officers, 47 non-commissioned officers, and 372 soldiers). The bases in Elvas and in Natz-Schabs were guarded by the 4th Fusiliers Company of the 3rd Missile Brigade "Aquileia".

On 12 November 1976 the President of the Italian Republic Giovanni Leone issued decree 846, which assigned the flag and traditions of the 1st Heavy Artillery Regiment to the 1st Heavy Artillery Group "Adige".

On 31 July 1983 the group and 7th Battery were disbanded, while the group's 8th Battery moved to Verona, where it was assigned to the 9th Heavy Artillery Group "Rovigo". Afterwards the flag of the 1st Heavy Artillery Regiment was transferred to the Shrine of the Flags in the Vittoriano in Rome.
