= 3rd Heavy Artillery Regiment "Volturno" =

Inactive Italian Army missile artillery unit

- 3° Reggimento Artiglieria Pesante "Volturno"
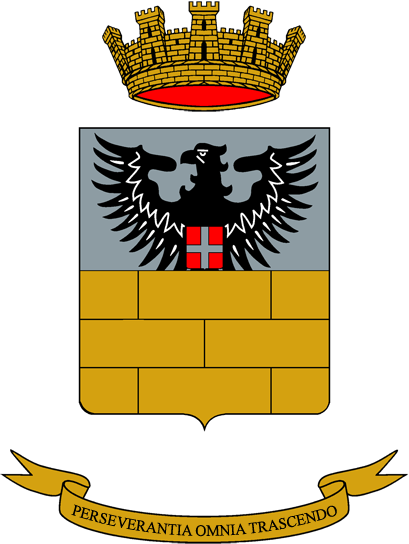
- Regimental coat of arms
- Active: 1 October 1910 – 8 September 1943; 1 Nov 1955 – 1 December 2001
- Country: Italy
- Branch: Italian Army
- Part of: 3rd Missile Brigade "Aquileia"
- Garrison/HQ: Oderzo
- Motto: "Perseverantia omnia trascendo"
- Anniversaries: 15 June 1918 – Second Battle of the Piave River

Insignia
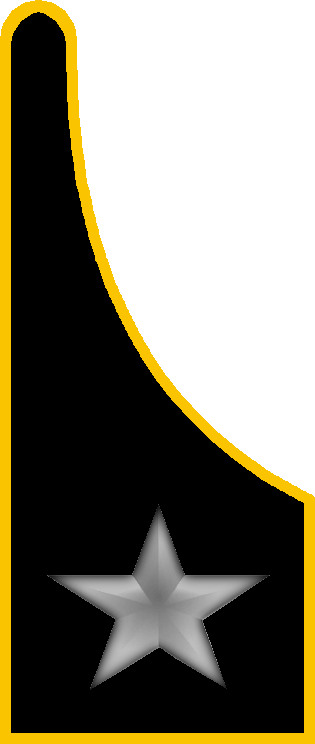
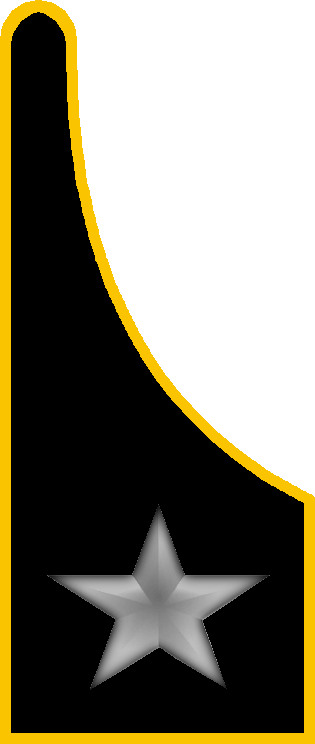
- Regimental gorget patches

The 3rd Heavy Artillery Regiment "Volturno" (Italian: 3° Reggimento Artiglieria Pesante "Volturno") is an inactive rocket artillery regiment of the Italian Army, which was based in Oderzo in Veneto. Originally an artillery regiment of the Royal Italian Army, the regiment was formed in 1910 with pre-existing batteries. During World War I the regiment's groups and batteries fought on the Italian front. In World War II the regiment formed two army artillery groupings, one of which participated in 1941 in the invasion of Yugoslavia, while the other was sent to North Africa, where it fought in the Western Desert campaign and the Tunisian campaign. The regiment was disbanded by invading German forces after the announcement of the Armistice of Cassibile on 8 September 1943.

The regiment was reformed in 1955 as 3rd Heavy Artillery Regiment and served as a support unit for the III Army Corps. In 1959 the regiment was equipped with MGR-1 Honest John rockets and in 1960 it was renamed 3rd Missile Artillery Regiment. The regiment was assigned to the III Missile Brigade, which consisted of the Italian Army's units with a nuclear weapons mission. The US Army's 559th Artillery Group stored the W31 nuclear warheads for the regiment's battalions at four sites in Northern Italy. In 1974 the regiment was reduced to a single group, which was re-equipped with MGM-52 Lance tactical ballistic missiles. In 1975 the regiment was disbanded and the remaining group became an autonomous unit, which was renamed 3rd Missile Artillery Group "Volturno" and assigned the flag and traditions of the 3rd Heavy Artillery Regiment. The group's nuclear mission came to an end in 1992. The same year the group was reorganized as 3rd Heavy Artillery Regiment "Volturno" and equipped with M270 Multiple Launch Rocket Systems. In 2001 the regiment was disbanded and its personnel and materiel transferred to the 5th Field Artillery Regiment "Superga". The regimental anniversary falls, as for all Italian Army artillery regiments, on 15 June, the beginning of the Second Battle of the Piave River in 1918.

This article is about the Royal Italian Army's 3rd Heavy Artillery Regiment, which was a support unit assigned to an army-level command. This regiment is unrelated to the 3rd Heavy Field Artillery Regiment, which was a support unit assigned to a corps-level command, and unrelated to the 3rd Field Artillery Regiment, which was a support unit assigned to a division-level command.

== History ==
On 1 October 1910 the 8th Fortress Artillery Regiment was formed in Bologna. The new regiment initially consisted of four companies, two of which had been ceded by the 1st Fortress Artillery Regiment, one of which had been transferred from the disbanded Artillery Workers Companies Group, and one of which was a newly formed company. Of the companies that made up the new regiment, the 2nd Company had been deployed, together with the I Bersaglieri Battalion in 1860 to Sicily to support Giuseppe Garibaldi's Expedition of the Thousand. On 1 October 1860 the company participated with Garibaldi's Southern Army in the Battle of the Volturno, after which it was reintegrated into the Royal Sardinian Army, with which it fought in November 1860 in the Siege of Capua, from November 1860 to February 1861 in the Siege of Gaeta, and in March 1861 in the siege of Messina.

In May 1911 the regiment received two additional companies from the 7th Fortress Artillery Regiment and in June of the same year the regiment formed three new companies. Afterwards the regiment consisted of a staff, a depot, and three groups of three companies each. During the Italo-Turkish War in 1911–12 the regiment provided eight officers and 124 troops to units deployed for the war. On 1 October 1912 the regiment received a further two companies from the 5th Fortress Artillery Regiment.

=== World War I ===
During World War I the regiment's groups and batteries, as well as the units formed by the regiment's depot in Bologna, participated in all major battles of the Italian front. The regimental depot formed the commands of the 8th, 13th, 18th, 22nd, 24th, 61st, 63rd, 64th, and 70th siege groupings and the commands of 26 siege groups: VII, X, XVIII, XXIII, XXX, XXXVII, XXXIX, XL, XLI, LXIV, LXVI, LXIX LXXXI, LXXXIV, XCI, CXLII, CLII, CLVI, CLXV, CLXXIII, CCXIV CCXV, CCXXVI, CCXXXII, CCXXXIV, and CCXXXIX. For these groups and siege groups formed by other regiments the depot formed 96 siege batteries.

After the war the groups and batteries formed during the war were disbanded. On 1 March 1920 the army's artillery was reorganized again and the regiment was renamed 6th Heavy Artillery Regiment. On this occasion the regiment was assigned a link to the 3rd Regiment — Fortress Regiment, which had been formed on 1 July 1860 in Genoa and was assigned to the field artillery speciality on 13 November 1870 as 3rd Artillery Regiment. Also in 1920 the regiment moved from Bologna to Treviso. By January 1923 the regiment consisted of a command and four groups, which fielded a mix of cannons, howitzers, and mortars. Two of the groups were based in Treviso with the regimental command and the other two in Sacile. In April of the same year the regiment received a group based in Vittorio Veneto from the 3rd Heavy Artillery Regiment, and on 1 June transferred one of its groups to the 7th Heavy Artillery Regiment (Mixed) and received one group based in Trieste in return. On 30 June 1923 the regiment was renamed 6th Heavy Artillery Regiment (Mixed) and now included the V Coastal Group based in San Nicolò in Venice Lido.

In 1926 the regiment moved from Treviso to Palmanova and in fall of the same year the Royal Italian Army's heavy artillery was reorganized: two of ten regiments were disbanded and three were reorganized as coastal artillery regiments. On 31 October the 6th Heavy Artillery Regiment (Mixed) ceded I and II groups to the 5th Heavy Artillery Regiment and its V Group to the 7th Heavy Artillery Regiment (Mixed), while the regiment's two remaining groups, the III Group and IV Group, were renumbered as I Group and II Group. The next day, on 1 November 1926, the 6th Heavy Artillery Regiment (Mixed) was renamed 3rd Heavy Artillery Regiment and received the III, IV, and V groups of the 7th Heavy Artillery Regiment (Mixed), which on the same date was renamed 2nd Coastal Artillery Regiment.

In 1931 the regiment moved from Palmanova to Reggio Emilia. On 1 November 1932 the regiment received the V Group of the 9th Heavy Artillery Regiment. This group was based in Zadar and renumbered as VI Group upon entering the 3rd Heavy Artillery Regiment. In October 1934 the regiment was renamed 3rd Army Artillery Regiment and on 1 January 1935 the regiment disbanded its III Group, whose personnel was used to form the V Group of the 9th Army Artillery Regiment. The same year the regiment formed the command of a grouping and the command of a group, as well as two batteries for the Second Italo-Ethiopian War. On 23 September 1935 the regiment formed the III Position Artillery Replacements Group, which was intended to provide replacement personnel for units deployed in the Second Italo-Ethiopian War. This III Group was disbanded on 30 April 1936 and its personnel assigned to various units involved in the war; these units included the Royal Corps of Colonial Troops in Libya, the 10th Artillery Regiment "Volturno" of the 25th Infantry Division "Volturno", and the 7th Motorized Regiment, which was formed the next day, on 1 May 1936, in Palermo by the depot of the 12th Army Corps Artillery Regiment. In November 1936 the regiment formed a Marching Position Artillery Group, which was sent to Massawa in Eritrea to provide replacement personnel for units engaged in the war in Ethiopia.

=== World War II ===
At the outbreak of World War II the regiment consisted of a command, a group with 210/8 siege mortars, two groups with 152/13 howitzers, and a group with 149/35 heavy guns. During the war the regiment's depot in Reggio Emilia formed and mobilized the following commands:

- 3rd Army Artillery Grouping
- 8th Army Artillery Grouping
- 11th Army Artillery Grouping
- XIII Cannons Group with 149/35 heavy guns
- XIV Cannons Group with 149/35 heavy guns
- XV Cannons Group with 149/35 heavy guns
- XVI Cannons Group with 149/35 heavy guns
- XVII Cannons Group with 149/35 heavy guns
- XVIII Cannons Group with 149/35 heavy guns
- XXXII Cannons Group with 149/40 mod. 35 heavy guns
- LXV Howitzers Group with 152/13 howitzers
- LXVI Howitzers Group with 152/13 howitzers
- LXXXV Mortars Group with 210/8 siege mortars
- LXXXVI Mortars Group with 210/8 siege mortars
- XXXII Bombards Group with 240/12 L trench mortars
- 3rd Tractors Grouping and III Tractors Group

The regiment's depot also formed and mobilized the batteries for the group commands listed above. The groups operated either under command of army artillery groupings or as autonomous units. The depot was disbanded by invading German forces after the announcement of the Armistice of Cassibile on 8 September 1943.

- 3rd Army Artillery Grouping: on 10 June 1940, the day Italy entered World War II, the grouping consisted of a command, command unit, the XVI, XVII, and XVIII cannons groups with 149/35 heavy guns, and the LXV and LXVI howitzers groups with 152/13 howitzers. A few days later the grouping was reinforced with the LII and LVIII cannons groups with 105/32 heavy field guns, which had both been mobilized by 11th Army Corps Artillery Regiment. In January 1941 the grouping was mobilized again and included now the XVII Cannons Group with 149/35 heavy guns, and the LII and LVIII cannons groups with 105/32 heavy field guns. The grouping was deployed to the border with Yugoslavia and in April 1941 participated in the invasion of Yugoslavia. Afterwards the grouping remained in occupied Yugoslavia until it was disbanded by the Germans after 8 September 1943.
- 8th Army Artillery Grouping: the grouping was formed upon Italy's entry in World War II. In June 1940 the grouping participated in the invasion of France and at the time included the IX, X, and XI cannons groups with 149/35 heavy guns and the LXXXIII and LXXXIV mortars groups with 210/8 siege mortars, had all been mobilized by the 2nd Army Artillery Regiment. The grouping also included the LI Howitzers Group with 152/37 heavy field guns and CII Mortars Group with 260/9 mod. 16 heavy mortars, which had both been mobilized by the 4th Army Artillery Regiment. The grouping was mobilized again in May 1941 and consisted of a command, command unit, the CXXXI and CXLVII howitzers groups with 149/28 heavy field howitzers, which had been mobilized by the 9th Army Corps Artillery Regiment, as well as the XXXIII Cannons Group with 149/40 mod. 35 heavy guns and the LII Howitzers Group with 152/37 heavy field guns, which had both been mobilized by the 4th Army Artillery Regiment. In October 1941 the grouping was deployed to Libya, where it participated in the Western Desert campaign. The grouping fought in the Second Battle of El Alamein and then retreated with the Axis forces into Tunisia, where it participated in the Tunisian campaign. By 17 April 1943 the grouping was down to 17 howitzers and on 13 May 1943 the grouping surrendered along with the remaining Axis forces to the Allies.

=== Cold War ===
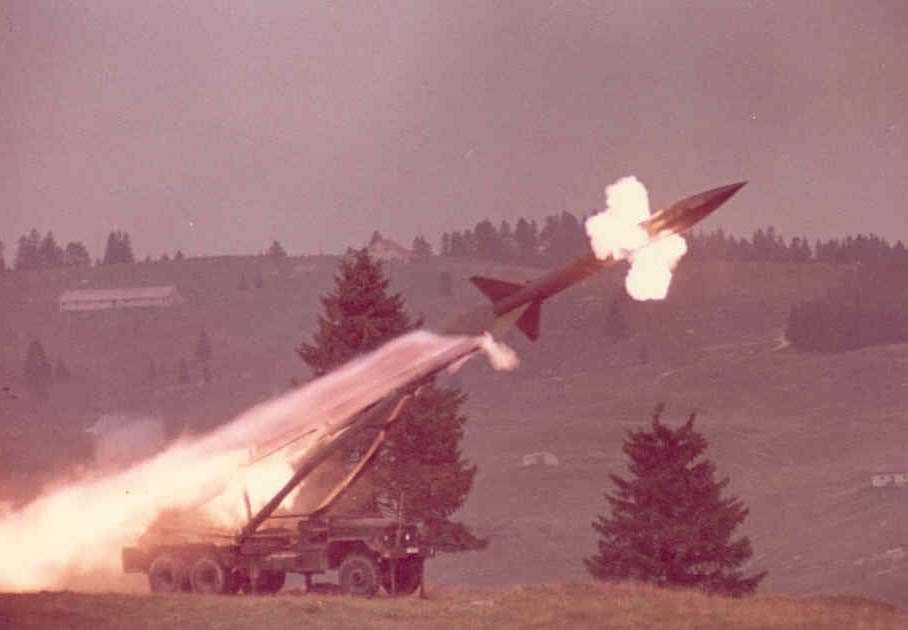
3rd Missile Artillery Regiment MGR-1 Honest John launch during an exercise in Asiago

On 1 November 1955 the 3rd Heavy Artillery Regiment was reformed in Brescia by renaming the 3rd Heavy Field Artillery Regiment. The regiment was assigned to the III Territorial Military Command and consisted of a command, a command unit, the I and II groups with M59 155mm field guns, and the III Group with M115 203mm howitzers. In 1958 the regiment, without its III Group, moved from Brescia to Vicenza, where the I and II groups began their conversion to rocket launcher units on 12 December 1958. On 10 January 1959 the first 44 Italian soldiers began the training to operate MGR-1 Honest John nuclear-capable surface-to-surface missiles at the US Army's Caserma Ederle in Vicenza. On 25 February 1959 the Italian soldiers launched their first Honest John missile from the training range at Bibione into the Adriatic Sea. On 1 March 1959 the regiments I and II groups were renamed I Rocket Launchers Group and II Rocket Launchers Group.

On 1 October 1959 the regiment's III Group exited the regiment and became an autonomous unit as XV Heavy Artillery Group. The same day the regiment was renamed 3rd Heavy Artillery Regiment (Missiles) and the regimental command formed the III Missile Brigade. On 15 November 1960 regiment formed the III Rocket Launchers Group in Oderzo. On 1 September 1961 the command of the III Missile Brigade and the command of the 3rd Heavy Artillery Regiment (Missiles) were split. Two months later, on 1 November 1961, the regiment was renamed 3rd Missile Artillery Regiment and the regiment's three groups were renamed I, II, and III Missile Artillery Groups. On 1 September 1962 the XV Heavy Artillery Group joined the III Missile Brigade and took on a nuclear weapons mission. On 15 November 1962 the regiment formed a IV Missile Artillery Group in Elvas and in 1963 the regiment and II Missile Artillery Group moved from Vicenza to Portogruaro. On 1 January 1966 each of the regiment's four groups received a fusilier company tasked with guarding the Honest John launchers. By 1966 the regiment consisted of the following units:

- 3rd Missile Artillery Regiment, in Portogruaro
  - Command Unit, in Portogruaro
  - I Missile Artillery Group, in Codogné
  - II Missile Artillery Group, in Portogruaro
  - III Missile Artillery Group, in Oderzo
  - IV Missile Artillery Group, in Elvas

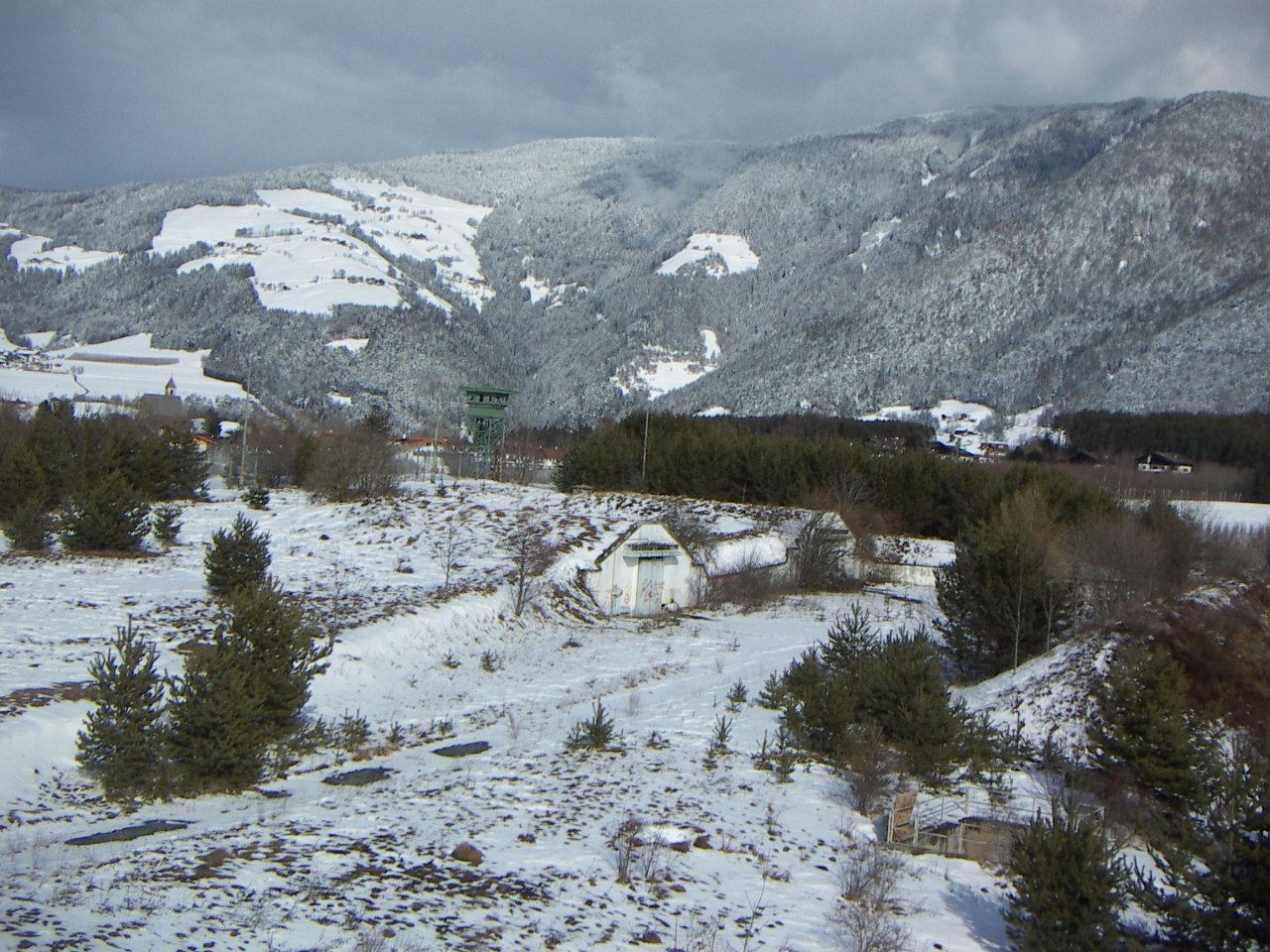
The nuclear warhead storage bunkers and one of the guard towers at Site Rigel in 2011

The nuclear warheads for the regiment were under operational control of the U.S. Army Southern European Task Force, whose 559th Artillery Group was tasked with their storage and maintenance. Until 1967 the W31 nuclear warheads for the Honest John rockets were stored, together with the W33 nuclear artillery shells for the XIV Heavy Artillery Group and XV Heavy Artillery Group, at Site Pluto in Longare near Vicenza. In Longare the US Army's 69th Ordnance Company guarded and maintained the nuclear warheads, while the 22nd Field Artillery Detachment and the 19th Explosive Ordnance Disposal Detachment were based at the nearby Site River in Tormeno. The Italian Army's 5th Anti-aircraft Missile Artillery Regiment's 8th Battery with MIM-23 Hawk air defence missile systems was stationed in San Rocco di Longare to protect the nuclear weapons storage site. In 1967 the US Army build four smaller nuclear warhead depots closer to the groups of the 3rd Missile Artillery Regiment:

- Site Algol in Orsago, where the 29th Field Artillery Detachment stored the warheads for the I Missile Artillery Group in Codogné
- Site Castor in Alvisopoli, where the 28th Field Artillery Detachment stored the warheads for the II Missile Artillery Group in Portogruaro
- Site Aldebaran in Chiarano, where the 12th Field Artillery Detachment stored the warheads for the III Missile Artillery Group in Oderzo
- Site Rigel in Naz-Sciaves, where the 11th Field Artillery Detachment stored the warheads for the IV Missile Artillery Group in Elvas

In preparation for the introduction of the MGM-52 Lance tactical ballistic missile into service the regiment's I and IV groups were disbanded on 31 July 1973. Afterwards the XIV Heavy Artillery Group moved from Trento into the empty base at Elvas. On 26 August 1974 Italian personnel arrived at the United States Army Field Artillery School in Fort Sill to start training on the Lance system. The training lasted until December and after the personnel returned to Italy in December 1974 the regiment's III Missile Artillery Group in Oderzo was disbanded on 31 December. The next day, on 1 January 1975, the personnel of the disbanded group, as well as the personnel that had returned from the training at Fort Sill, formed a new III Missile Artillery Group in Oderzo, which initially consisted of one battery with Lance missiles.

During the 1975 army reform the army disbanded the regimental level and newly independent battalions and groups were granted for the first time their own flags. On 30 September 1975 the 3rd Missile Artillery Regiment and II Missile Artillery Group, both stationed in Portogruaro, were disbanded. The next day, on 1 October 1975, the III Missile Artillery Group in Oderzo became an autonomous unit and was renamed 3rd Missile Artillery Group "Volturno". The group was named for the Volturno river in Southern Italy, where the 3rd Heavy Artillery Regiment's 2nd Company had its baptism of fire 115 years earlier on 1 October 1860 in the Battle of the Volturno. The group was assigned to the 3rd Missile Brigade "Aquileia" and consisted of the following units:

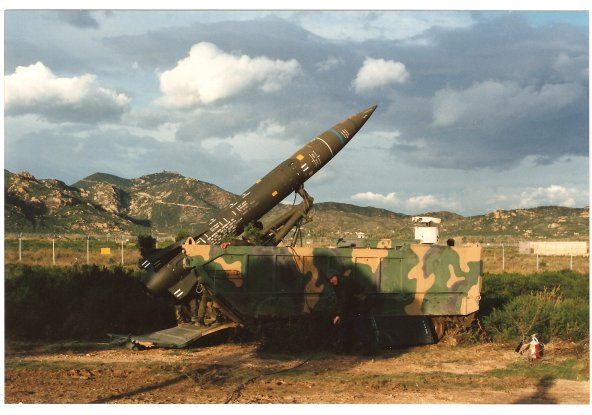
3rd Missile Artillery Group "Volturno" preparing to launch a MGM-52 Lance missile

- 3rd Missile Artillery Group "Volturno", in Oderzo
  - Command Battery, in Oderzo
  - 1st Lance Missile Battery, in Oderzo
  - 2nd Lance Missile Battery, in Codogné
  - 3rd Lance Missile Battery, in Codogné
  - 1st Fusiliers Company, in Codogné
  - 3rd Fusiliers Company, in Oderzo
  - Services Battery, in Oderzo

Each battery fielded two M752 Lance missile launchers. The W70 nuclear warheads for the Lance missiles were stored at Site Algol and Site Aldebaran, which were guarded by the US Army's 29th Field Artillery Detachment, respectively 12th Field Artillery Detachment. On 12 November 1976 the President of the Italian Republic Giovanni Leone issued decree 846, which assigned the flag and traditions of the 3rd Missile Artillery Regiment to the 3rd Missile Artillery Group "Volturno".

=== Recent times ===
On 31 November 1991 the 3rd Missile Brigade "Aquileia" was reduced to 3rd Artillery Regiment "Aquileia". In 1992 the US Army removed all nuclear warheads from Italy and the units of the 3rd Artillery Regiment "Aquileia" lost their nuclear weapons missions. After the end of its nuclear weapons mission, then 3rd Missile Artillery Group "Volturno" replaced its Lance missiles with M270 Multiple Launch Rocket Systems, for which Italy acquired 4,000 M26 rockets with M77 DPICM cluster munitions. On 31 July 1992 the 3rd Missile Artillery Group "Volturno" left the 3rd Artillery Regiment "Aquileia" and became an autonomous unit. On 28 September 1992 the 3rd Artillery Regiment "Aquileia" was disbanded and on the same day the 3rd Missile Artillery Group "Volturno" lost its autonomy. The next day the group entered the reformed 3rd Heavy Artillery Regiment "Volturno", which was assigned to the 5th Army Corps. The regiment remained a support unit of 5th Army Corps until 30 November 1997, as the next day the regiment was assigned to the army's Artillery Grouping.

In 2001 the regiment moved from Oderzo to Portogruaro. On 30 November 2001 the batteries of the 5th Heavy Field Artillery Regiment "Superga" in Udine were disbanded and the regiment's flag was transferred to Portogruaro, where the next day it supplanted the flag of the 3rd Heavy Artillery Regiment "Volturno", which was then transferred to the Shrine of the Flags in the Vittoriano in Rome
