= 9th Heavy Artillery Regiment (Italy) =

Inactive Italian Army nuclear artillery unit

- 9° Reggimento Artiglieria Pesante
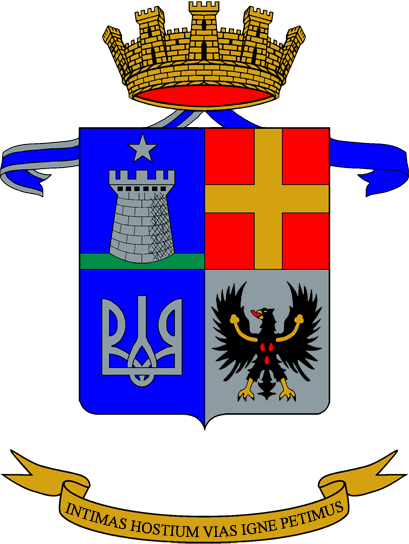
- Regimental coat of arms
- Active: 1 Nov. 1926 — 8 Sept. 1943; 1 Sept. 1950 — 30 Sept. 1973; 1 Oct. 1975 — 25 Sept. 1995
- Country: Italy
- Branch: Italian Army
- Part of: 3rd Missile Brigade "Aquileia"
- Garrison/HQ: Verona
- Motto: "Intimas hostium vias igne petimus"
- Anniversaries: 15 June 1918 - Second Battle of the Piave River
- Decorations: 1x Silver Medal of Military Valor; 1x Bronze Medal of Military Valor

Insignia
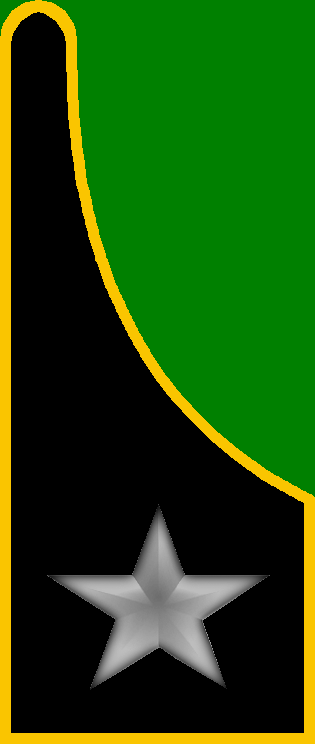
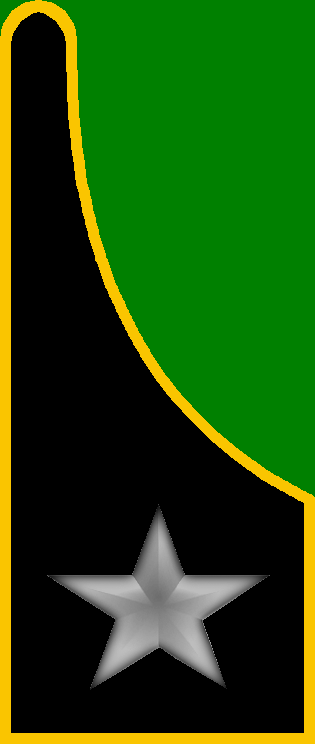
- Regimental gorget patches

The 9th Heavy Artillery Regiment (Italian: 9° Reggimento Artiglieria Pesante) is an inactive heavy artillery regiment of the Italian Army, which was based in Verona in Veneto. Originally an anti-aircraft artillery center of the Royal Italian Army, the center was reorganized as a heavy artillery regiment in 1930. In 1937 the regiment was transferred to the Guardia alla Frontiera, which was tasked with manning the fortifications of the Alpine Wall. During World War II the regiment formed two Guardia alla Frontiera artillery groupings, which participated in 1941 in the invasion of Yugoslavia. The regiment also formed the 9th Army Artillery Grouping, which participated in 1940 in the invasion of France and in 1941 in the invasion of Yugoslavia. In summer 1942 the 9th Army Artillery Grouping was assigned to the Italian Army in Russia, which was deployed to the Eastern Front. The Italian Army in Russia was destroyed in winter 1942-43 during the Soviet Operation Little Saturn and the remnants of the 9th Army Artillery Grouping were repatriated in spring 1943. The regiment and its groupings were disbanded by invading German forces after the announcement of the Armistice of Cassibile on 8 September 1943.

The regiment was reformed in 1950 as 9th Heavy Artillery Regiment and served as a support unit for the IV Army Corps. In 1973 the regiment was disbanded and its groups transferred to other regiments. In 1975 the XV Heavy Artillery Group in Verona was renamed 9th Heavy Artillery Group "Rovigo" and assigned the flag and traditions of the 9th Heavy Artillery Regiment. The group was assigned to the 3rd Missile Brigade "Aquileia", which consisted of the Italian Army's units with a nuclear weapons mission. The group was armed with M115 203mm howitzers, for which the US Army's 69th Ordnance Company and 28th Field Artillery Detachment, which were both part of the 559th Artillery Group, stored W33 and later W79 nuclear artillery shells at Site Pluto in Longare. In 1986 the Italian Army's nuclear weapons mission was assigned to the 27th Heavy Self-propelled Artillery Group "Marche" and consequently the 9th Heavy Artillery Group "Rovigo" was transferred from the 3rd Missile Brigade "Aquileia" to the Artillery Command of the 5th Army Corps. In 1992 the group was reorganized as regiment and assigned to the Artillery Command of the 4th Alpine Army Corps. in 1995 the regiment was disbanded. The regimental anniversary falls, as for all Italian Army artillery regiments, on June 15, the beginning of the Second Battle of the Piave River in 1918.

This article is about the Royal Italian Army's 9th Heavy Artillery Regiment, which was a support unit assigned to an army-level command. This regiment is unrelated to the 9th Heavy Field Artillery Regiment, which was a support unit assigned to a corps-level command, and unrelated to the 9th Field Artillery Regiment, which was a support unit assigned to a division-level command.

== History ==
On 1 November 1926 the 6th Anti-aircraft Artillery Center was formed in Rovigo, which incorporated the existing 4th Anti-aircraft Group. On 1 January 1927 the center consisted of a command, a trucked group with 75/27 C.K. anti-aircraft guns, a positional group with 76/45 anti-aircraft guns, a photo-electricians unit with search, and a depot. The center's photo-electricians operated searchlights. In 1927 the center moved from Rovigo to Rimini. On 31 March 1930 the center transferred the trucked group with 75/27 C.K. anti-aircraft guns and the photo-electricians unit to the 9th Anti-aircraft Artillery Center. The next day, on 1 April 1930, the center received a positional group with 76/45 anti-aircraft guns from the 8th Anti-aircraft Artillery Center. On 1 June of the same year the center was reorganized and renamed 9th Heavy Artillery Regiment and on 15 June the regiment received a group from the 3rd Coastal Artillery Regiment. Afterwards the regiment consisted of a command, the I, II, and IV groups, and a depot. One of the batteries the regiment received on 15 June had participated as 8th Battery in 1860-61 in the Piedmontese invasion of Central and Southern Italy, during which the battery had distinguished itself on 13 March 1861 in the Siege of Messina. For this the 8th Battery had been awarded a Bronze Medal of Military Valor, which was affixed to the 9th Heavy Artillery Regiment's flag and is depicted on the regiment's coat of arms.

On 16 May 1931 the regiment formed a III Group and on 15 September of the same year the regiment received another group based in Zadar from the disbanded 12th Anti-aircraft Artillery Center. On 17 October 1932 the regimental command and the IV Group moved from Rimini to Belluno. On 1 November 1932 the regiment ceded its V Group in Zadar to the 3rd Heavy Artillery Regiment. In October 1934 the regiment was renamed 9th Army Artillery Regiment and on 1 January 1935 the regiment reformed its V Group with personnel ceded by the 3rd Army Artillery Regiment. In 1935-36 the regiment provided seven officers and 291 troops for units deployed overseas for the Second Italo-Ethiopian War, and in April 1936 the regiment formed the 226th, 227th, 246th, and 247th position batteries for the 2nd Colonial Artillery Regiment, which was based in Libya.

On 13 May 1937 the Chief of Staff of the Royal Italian Army and Under-Secretary of War General Alberto Pariani ordered that the regiment should be transferred to the newly formed Guardia alla Frontiera, which was tasked with manning the fortifications of the Alpine Wall. The reorganization of the regiment began after the summer exercises 1937 with the move of the regimental command and depot from Belluno to Gorizia. In the course of the year the regiment was renamed 9th Guardia alla Frontiera Artillery Regiment and the regiment's depot reorganized as a mixed depot, responsible to train and mobilize all Guardia alla Frontiera infantry, artillery, and engineer units in the area of the Army Corps of Udine. The reorganization of the regiment concluded on 1 May 1938 and the regiment consisted then of a command in Gorizia, the I Group in Tolmin, the II and III groups in Vipava, the mixed depot in Gorizia, the branch depot in Cividale, and the mobilization magazines in Tolmin and Vipava.

The regiment's depot in Gorizia was responsible to mobilize the following units in case of war:

- commands of the Guardia alla Frontiera artillery groups: L, LII, LVI, LVIII, LXI, LXII, LXIV, LXV, LXVI, LXXIV
- batteries with 75/27 mod. 06 field guns: 80th, 87th, 88th, 90th, and 94th
- batteries with 100/17 mod. 14 howitzers: 306th, 307th, 308th, 309th, 310th, 311th, 319th, 320th, and 321st
- batteries with 149/12 howitzers: 190th, 191st, and 193rd
- batteries with 149/35 heavy guns: 151st, 152, 153rd, 161st, 168th, and 169th

And the regiment's branch depot in Cividale was responsible to mobilize the following units in case of war:

- commands of the Guardia alla Frontiera artillery groups: XLIX, LI, and LX
- batteries with 75/27 mod. 06 field guns: 89th and 324th
- batteries with 100/17 mod. 14 howitzers: 300th, 301st, 302nd, 303rd, 304th, 305th, and 315th

As the groups were tasked with defending specific sectors of the Italian borders areas, the mobilized batteries would have been assigned to the groups as needed by the military situation.

=== World War II ===
At the outbreak of World War II the regiment mobilized its units and the commands of the 9th and 17th Guardia alla Frontiera artillery groupings. The mobilized groups operated either under command of the two artillery groupings or as autonomous units. The depot was disbanded by invading German forces after the announcement of the Armistice of Cassibile on 8 September 1943.

- 9th Guardia alla Frontiera Artillery Grouping: the grouping was formed on 28 May 1940 in Gorizia and consisted of a command, a command unit, the LII Group with 149/12 howitzers, LVIII Group with 149/35 heavy guns, and the LXI and LXIV groups with 100/17 mod. 14 howitzers. The grouping was deployed in Idrija along the border with Yugoslavia. In April 1941 the grouping participated in the invasion of Yugoslavia and afterwards was deployed in occupied Yugoslavia. In January 1942 the grouping was reduced in size and afterwards consisted of the LII Group and the LXXIV Group with 75/27 mod. 06 field guns. At the beginning of 1943 the grouping was reduced to just the LXXIV Group, which at the time did not field any batteries. On 8 September 1943 the grouping was in Logatec in Slovenia, where it was disbanded by the Germans.
- 17th Guardia alla Frontiera Artillery Grouping: the grouping was formed on 28 May 1940 in Gorizia and consisted of a command, a command unit, the LXII and LXVI groups with 100/17 mod. 14 howitzers, and the LXV Group, which consisted of two batteries with 75/27 mod. 06 field guns and one battery with 149/12 howitzers. The grouping was immediately deployed to Postojna along the border with Yugoslavia. At the beginning of 1943 the grouping was deployed in Rakek and reduced to just the LXII and LXVI groups, with the latter not fielding any batteries. After 8 September 1943 the grouping was disbanded by the Germans.
- 9th Army Artillery Grouping: the grouping was formed in fall 1939 by the depot of the 4th Army Artillery Regiment in Piacenza. In June 1940 the grouping consisted of the II and XXIV cannons groups with 105/28 cannons, which had both been mobilized by the 1st Army Corps Artillery Regiment, the XV Cannons Group with 149/35 heavy guns 3rd Army Artillery Regiment, which had been mobilized by the 3rd Army Artillery Regiment, the LXI Howitzers Group with 152/13 howitzers, which had been mobilized by the 1st Army Artillery Regiment, and the CII Howitzers Group with 149/13 heavy howitzers, which had been mobilized by the 1st Army Corps Artillery Regiment. In this configuration the grouping participated in the invasion of France in the sector of Bardonecchia. In January 1941 the grouping was mobilized again and deployed to Pivka for the invasion of Yugoslavia. On 13 May 1941 the command of the grouping moved to Lodi, where it remained until it moved to Savona on 30 September 1941. The grouping was now tasked with coastal defense and consisted of the V and VI cannons groups with 105/28 cannons, which had both been mobilized by the 15th Army Corps Artillery Regiment, and three Guardia alla Frontiera groups. In April 1942 the grouping returned to Piacenza, where it was prepared for its deployment with the Italian Army in Russia to the Eastern Front. When the grouping departed for the Soviet Union it consisted of the following units:

- 9th Army Artillery Grouping
  - XXIV Howitzers Group (mobilized by the 1st Army Corps Artillery Regiment)
    - 3× Batteries — 4× 149/28 heavy field howitzers per battery
  - XXXI Cannons Group (mobilized by the 2nd Army Artillery Regiment)
    - 3× Batteries — 4× 149/40 mod. 35 heavy guns per battery
  - XXXII Cannons Group (mobilized by the 3rd Army Artillery Regiment)
    - 3× Batteries — 4× 149/40 mod. 35 heavy guns per battery
  - XXXIV Cannons Group (mobilized by the 1st Army Artillery Regiment)
    - 3× Batteries — 4× 149/40 mod. 35 heavy guns per battery
  - L Howitzers Group (mobilized by the 2nd Army Corps Artillery Regiment)
    - 3× Batteries — 4× 149/28 heavy field howitzers heavy field howitzers per battery
  - LXXIII Cannons Group (mobilized by the 5th Army Artillery Regiment)
    - 3× Batteries — 4× 210/22 heavy howitzers per battery

In January 1943 the grouping, along with most of the Italian Army in Russia, was destroyed during the Soviet Operation Little Saturn. The grouping was still in the process of being rebuilt when it was disbanded by invading German forces after the announcement of the Armistice of Cassibile on 8 September 1943. For its conduct in the Soviet Union the grouping was awarded a Silver Medal of Military Valor. After World War II the Italian Army decided to assign the traditions of the 9th Army Artillery Grouping to the until then unrelated 9th Heavy Artillery Regiment. Consequently the Silver Medal of Military Valor, which the 9th Army Artillery Grouping had earned in the Soviet Union, was affixed to the flag of the 9th Heavy Artillery Regiment and is depicted on the regiment's coat of arms.

=== Cold War ===
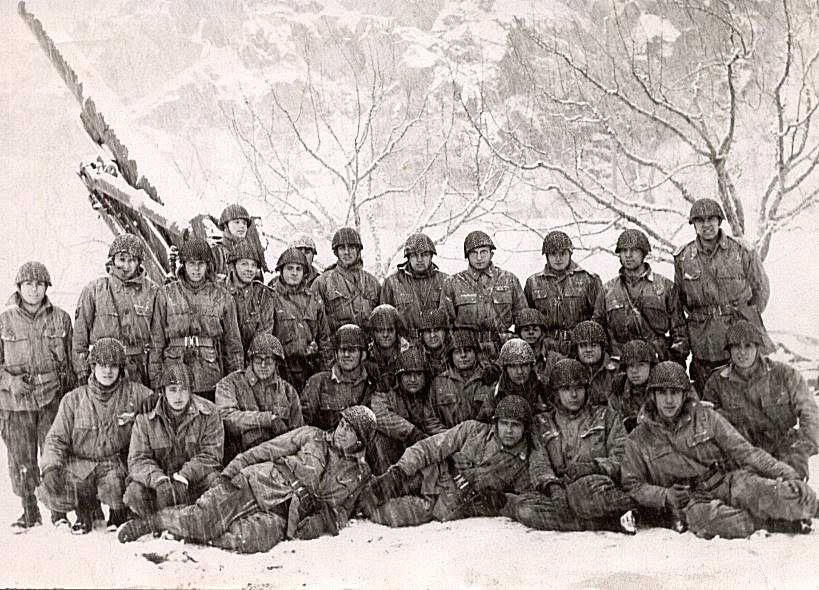
9th Heavy Artillery Regiment winter exercise in 1965

On 1 September 1950 the 9th Heavy Artillery Regiment was reformed in Verona. The regiment was assigned to the IV Territorial Military Command and consisted of a command, a command unit, and the I and II groups with M114 155mm howitzers. In August 1951 the regiment moved from Verona to Trento and there it formed the III and IV groups with M59 155mm field guns. On 1 April 1952 the regiment formed the V Group with 210/22 heavy howitzers and on 1 May of the same year the regiment was assigned to the IV Army Corps. On 5 December 1952 the regiment renumbered its groups, and then consisted of the following units:

- 9th Heavy Artillery Regiment, in Trento
  - Command Unit
  - I Group with 210/22 heavy howitzers
  - II Group with M59 155mm field guns
  - III Group with M59 155mm field guns
  - IV Group with M114 155mm howitzers
  - V Group with M114 155mm howitzers

On 30 June 1953 the IV and V groups were transferred to the 33rd Field Artillery Regiment, respectively the 21st Field Artillery Regiment. On 1 November 1954 the regiment formed a Light Aircraft Section with L-21B artillery observation planes. In June 1955 the I Group replaced its 210/22 heavy howitzers with M115 203mm howitzers. On 1 March 1956 regiment formed the IV Army Corps Artillery Specialists Unit, which on 1 March 1958 became autonomous and was assigned as IV Army Corps Artillery Specialists Group to the IV Army Corps. On 31 August 1962 the 10th Battery left the regiment's III Group and became an autonomous battery of the regiment. The next day, on 1 September 1962, the III Group exited the regiment and became an autonomous unit as XIV Heavy Artillery Group. The group was re-equipped with M115 203mm howitzers and assigned to the III Missile Brigade, which consisted of the Italian Army's units with a nuclear weapons mission.

In the following years the regiment used the autonomous 10th Company to form a new III Group. In March 1963 the Italian Army reorganized its light aviation and the 9th Heavy Artillery Regiment's Light Aircraft Section was used to help form new light aviation units. On 30 September 1973 the regiment was disbanded and its I and II groups were transferred to the 4th Heavy Field Artillery Regiment, while the III Group was transferred to the 52nd Heavy Artillery Regiment.

During the 1975 army reform the army disbanded the regimental level and newly independent battalions and groups were granted for the first time their own flags. On 1 October 1975 the XV Heavy Artillery Group in Verona was renamed 9th Heavy Artillery Group "Rovigo". The group was named for the city of Rovigo, where the regiment had been founded in 1926. The group was assigned to the 3rd Missile Brigade "Aquileia" and consisted of the a command, a command and services battery, and two batteries, which both fielded four M115 203mm howitzers. At the time the group fielded 450 men (31 officers, 47 non-commissioned officers, and 372 soldiers).

The XV Heavy Artillery Group had been formed on 1 October 1959 in Brescia, when the III Group of the 3rd Heavy Artillery Regiment became an autonomous unit. The group consisted of a command, a command unit, and two batteries with M115 203mm howitzers. On 1 September 1962 the group was assigned, together with the XIV Heavy Artillery Group, to the III Missile Brigade and took on a nuclear weapons mission. In 1968 the group moved from Brescia to Verona. The W33 and later W79 nuclear artillery shells for the group were stored by the US Army's 28th Field Artillery Detachment at Site Pluto in Longare.

On 12 November 1976 the President of the Italian Republic Giovanni Leone issued decree 846, which assigned the flag and traditions of the 9th Heavy Artillery Regiment to the 9th Heavy Artillery Group "Rovigo".

On 31 July 1983 the 1st Heavy Artillery Group "Adige" was disbanded and that group's 8th Battery moved from Elvas to Verona, where the next day it was assigned to the 9th Heavy Artillery Group "Rovigo", which renumbered the battery as 3rd Battery. In 1986 the Italian Army's nuclear weapons mission was assigned to the 27th Heavy Self-propelled Artillery Group "Marche" and consequently the 9th Heavy Artillery Group "Rovigo" was transferred on 31 December 1986 from the 3rd Missile Brigade "Aquileia" to the Artillery Command of the 5th Army Corps.

=== Recent times ===
On 31 July 1992 the group was transferred from the 5th Army Corps to the Artillery Command of the 4th Alpine Army Corps. On 8 September of the same year the group lost its autonomy and the next day entered, together with an Anti-aircraft Battery with 40/70 autocannons, the reformed 9th Heavy Field Artillery Regiment "Rovigo". The regiment was equipped with FH-70 155mm howitzers and remained a support unit of the 4th Alpine Army Corps.

On 25 September 1995 the 9th Heavy Field Artillery Regiment "Rovigo" was disbanded and on 16 November of the same year the flag of the 9th Heavy Artillery Regiment was transferred to the Shrine of the Flags in the Vittoriano in Rome.
