= Guardia alla Frontiera =

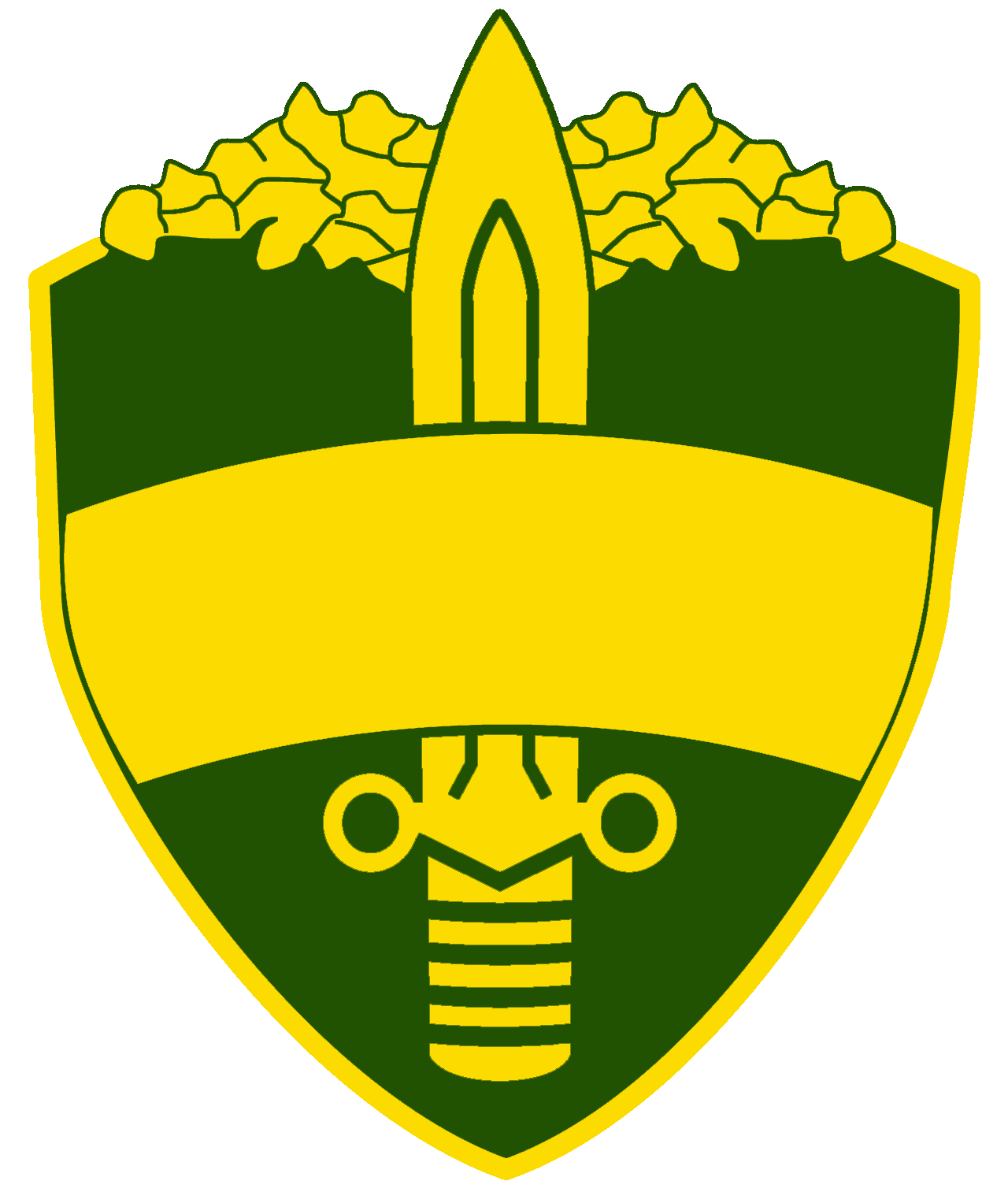
- Guardia alla Frontiera emblem
- Active: 1934 – 1953
- Country: Italy
- Allegiance: Kingdom of Italy; Republic of Italy
- Branch: Royal Italian Army
- Type: Border Guard
- Role: Mountain Warfare
- Size: 8 Corps areas with 27 Sectors
- Regimental Centre: Vallo Alpino
- Nickname: Vidoa
- Motto: Dei sacri confini guardia sicura
- Colors: Green
- Engagements: World War II

The Guardia alla Frontiera (GaF) (transl. "border guard"), was an Regio Esercito border guard created in 1937 who defended the 1,851 km of northern Italian frontiers with the "Vallo Alpino Occidentale" (487 km with France), "Vallo Alpino Settentrionale" (724 km with Switzerland and 420 km with Austria) and "Vallo Alpino Orientale" (220 km with Yugoslavia).

In 1940, the GaF had 21,000 military personnel, deployed in eight commands, 27 sectors, and seven regiments of artillery. It manned 1,000 fortifications, 6,000 machine guns, 1,000 mortars, 100 Cannone da 47/32 M35, and another thousand other medium and small-caliber cannons (75/27 and 149/35).

By 10 June 1940 (Italy's entry into the war) the GaF (not counting colonies in Libya and Albania) contained 23 sectors, 50,000 men, 28 battalions "Vallo Alpino", and 22 battalions of fascist militia.

== Organization ==
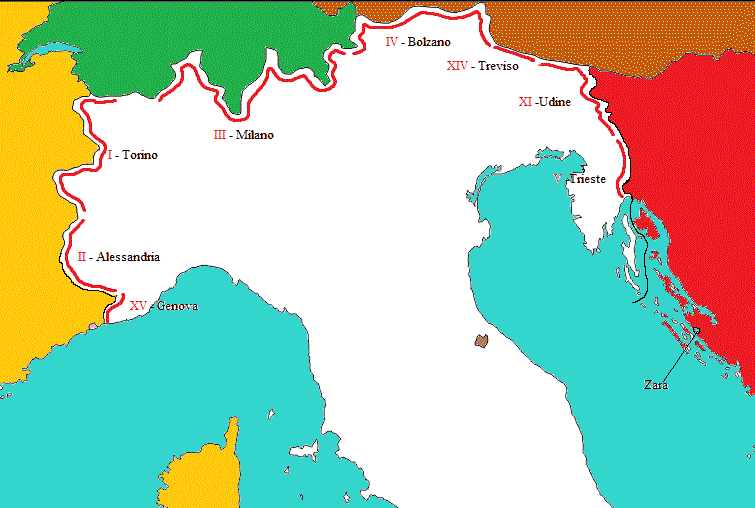
Guardia alla Frontiera corps in 1940

Each command of the army of GaF could be divided into "sectors" (27 areas of coverage, from I to XXVII, along the border; sectors XVIII, XIX and XX were never realized), which could be broken down into subsectors and so on for ever smaller units. Each command in the field had two or more subsectors which controlled the fortifications. These works were manned by infantry, artillery, engineers, etc. Despite the GaF being predominantly static it also received five light tank (carristi) companies, equipped with Fiat 3000 tanks that over time, due to their age and lack of spare parts, ended largely abandoned in Sector armories or buried to use the turrets as a fort.

The Guardia alla Frontiera disappeared after 1943, but nominally was active until 1953.

The sectors in 1943 were mostly focused on covering Northern Italy, thus leading to the creation of the coverage sectors of Western Alpine Valley, for the Western Alpine Valley and the Eastern Alpine Valley. However, as the war went on new sectors were created along the borders of Italian colonies, and occupied territories by Italy, such as Albania, Libya and Tunisia.

=== In Italy ===
==== Vallo alpino occidentale ====
Army Corps	Sector	Sector HQ	Subsectors	Subsector HQ	Area responsible
XV - Genoa	I Bassa Roja	Bordighera	1/a Destra Roja	Ventimiglia	Ligurian Sea - Testa dell'Alpe
XV - Genoa	I Bassa Roja	Bordighera	1/b Sinistra Roja	Dolceacqua	Ligurian Sea - Testa dell'Alpe
XV - Genoa	V Media Roja	Taggia	5/a Muratone	Pigna	Testa dell'Alpe - Balcone di Marta
XV - Genoa	V Media Roja	Taggia	5/b Marta	Molini di Triora	Testa dell'Alpe - Balcone di Marta
II - Alessandria	II Alta Roja - Gessi	Cuneo	2/a Alta Roja	Tende	Balcone di Marta - Ponte Negri
II - Alessandria	II Alta Roja - Gessi	Cuneo	2/b Gessi	Valdieri	Balcone di Marta - Ponte Negri
II - Alessandria	III Stura	Vinadio	3/a Collalunga - San Salvatore	Vinadio	Ponte Negri - Passo di Vanclava
II - Alessandria	III Stura	Vinadio	3/b Alta Stura	Sambuco	Ponte Negri - Passo di Vanclava
II - Alessandria	IV Maira - Po	Saluzzo	4/a Maira	Prazzo	Passo di Vanclava - Monte Granero
II - Alessandria	IV Maira - Po	Saluzzo	4/b Varaita	Casteldelfino	Passo di Vanclava - Monte Granero
II - Alessandria	IV Maira - Po	Saluzzo	4/c Po	Crissolo	Passo di Vanclava - Monte Granero
I - Turin	VI Pellice - Germanasca	Pinerolo	6/a Pellice	Torre Pellice	Monte Granero - Col d'Abries
I - Turin	VI Pellice - Germanasca	Pinerolo	6/b Germanasca	Perrero	Monte Granero - Col d'Abries
I - Turin	VII Monginevro	Cesana	7/a Cesana	Bousson	Col d'Abreis - Passo Desertes
I - Turin	VII Monginevro	Cesana	7/b Val Chisone	Cesana	Col d'Abreis - Passo Desertes
I - Turin	VIII Bardonecchia	Bardonecchia	8/a Colomion	Bardonecchia	Passo Desertes - Monte Niblé
I - Turin	VIII Bardonecchia	Bardonecchia	8/b Melmise	Bardonecchia	Passo Desertes - Monte Niblé
I - Turin	IX Moncenisio	Susa	9/a Clapier	Susa	Monte Niblè - Rocciamelone
I - Turin	IX Moncenisio	Susa	9/b Moncenisio	Mont Cenis	Monte Niblè - Rocciamelone
I - Turin	Autonomous Subsector Levanna			Lanzo Torinese	Rocciamelone - Cima Galisia
I - Turin	X Baltea	Aosta	10/a Nivolet - Valgrisenza	Valgrisenza	Cima Galisia - Monte Rosa
I - Turin	X Baltea	Aosta	10/b Piccolo S.Bernardo - Seigne	San Desiderio Terme	Cima Galisia - Monte Rosa
I - Turin	X Baltea	Aosta	10/c Gran S.Bernardo	San Remigio	Cima Galisia - Monte Rosa

Three artillery regiments supported the sectors of the Vallo alpino occidentale:

- 7th Guardia alla Frontiera Artillery Regiment, in Cuneo
- 8th Guardia alla Frontiera Artillery Regiment, in Venaria Reale
- 11th Guardia alla Frontiera Artillery Regiment, in Savona

==== Vallo alpino settentrionale ====
Army Corps	Sector	Sector HQ	Subsectors	Subsector HQ	Area responsible
III - Milan	XI Laghi	Varese	11/a Val d'Ossola	Domodossola	Monte Rosa - Pizzo Martello
III - Milan	XI Laghi	Varese	11/b Verbano-Lario	Como	Monte Rosa - Pizzo Martello
III - Milan	XII Valtellina	Sondrio	12/a Morbegno	Chiavenna	Pizzo Martello - Cima Garibaldi
III - Milan	XII Valtellina	Sondrio	12/b Bormio	Madonna di Tirano	Pizzo Martello - Cima Garibaldi
IV - Bolzano	XIII Venosta	Merano	13/a Resia	Mals	Cima Garibaldi - Cima Libera
IV - Bolzano	XIII Venosta	Merano	13/b Passiria	Merano	Cima Garibaldi - Cima Libera
IV - Bolzano	XIV Isarco	Brixen	14/a Brennero	Gossensaß	Cima Libera - Pizzo di Alpre
IV - Bolzano	XIV Isarco	Brixen	14/b Vipiteno	Sterzing	Cima Libera - Pizzo di Alpre
IV - Bolzano	XV Pusteria	Bruneck	15/a Drava	Innichen	Pizzo di Alpre - Sella Frugnoni
IV - Bolzano	XV Pusteria	Bruneck	15/b Rienza	Welsberg	Pizzo di Alpre - Sella Frugnoni
XIV - Treviso	XVI Cadore - Carnia	Tolmezzo	16/a Cadore	Santo Stefano di Cadore	Sella Frugnoni - Sella Valdolce
XIV - Treviso	XVI Cadore - Carnia	Tolmezzo	16/b Val Degano	Forni Avoltri	Sella Frugnoni - Sella Valdolce
XIV - Treviso	XVI Cadore - Carnia	Tolmezzo	16/c Val But	Paluzza	Sella Frugnoni - Sella Valdolce
XIV - Treviso	XVI Cadore - Carnia	Tolmezzo	16/d Val Chiarsò	Paularo	Sella Frugnoni - Sella Valdolce
XIV - Treviso	XVII Tarvisio	Pontebba	17/a Pontebba	Pontebba	Sella Valdolce - Monte Termine
XIV - Treviso	XVII Tarvisio	Pontebba	17/b Ugovizza	Ugovizza	Sella Valdolce - Monte Termine
XIV - Treviso	XVII Tarvisio	Pontebba	17/c Silizza	Tarvisio	Sella Valdolce - Monte Termine
XIV - Treviso	XVII Tarvisio	Pontebba	17/d Val Romana	Fusine Valromana	Sella Valdolce - Monte Termine

One artillery regiment and one autonomous artillery group supported the sectors of the Vallo alpino settentrionale:

- 6th Guardia alla Frontiera Artillery Regiment, in Bolzano
- Guardia alla Frontiera Autonomous Artillery Group, in Sondrio

==== Vallo alpino orientale ====
Army Corps	Sector	Sector HQ	Subsectors	Subsector HQ	Area responsible
XI - Udine	XXI Alto Isonzo	Tolmin	21/a	Trenta	Monte Termine - Passo di Piedicolle
XI - Udine	XXI Alto Isonzo	Tolmin	21/b	Polubino	Monte Termine - Passo di Piedicolle
XI - Udine	XXI Alto Isonzo	Tolmin	21/c	Podbrdo	Monte Termine - Passo di Piedicolle
XI - Udine	XXII Idria	Idrija	22/a	Cerkno	Passo di Piedicolle - Zolla-Selva di Piro-Cauzze
XI - Udine	XXII Idria	Idrija	22/b	Idrija	Passo di Piedicolle - Zolla-Selva di Piro-Cauzze
XI - Udine	XXII Idria	Idrija	22/c	Črni Vrh	Passo di Piedicolle - Zolla-Selva di Piro-Cauzze
XI - Udine	XXIII Postumia	Postojna	23/a	Vipava	Zolla-Selva di Piro-Cauzze - Monte Grosso
XI - Udine	XXIII Postumia	Postojna	23/b	Postojna	Zolla-Selva di Piro-Cauzze - Monte Grosso
V - Trieste	XXV Timavo	Pivka	25/a Timavo	Pivka	Monte Grosso - Testa d'Orso
V - Trieste	XXV Timavo	Pivka	25/b Nevoso	Knežak	Monte Grosso - Testa d'Orso
V - Trieste	XXVI Carnaro	Ilirska Bistrica	26/a Trestenico	Ilirska Bistrica	Testa d'Orso - Volosca
V - Trieste	XXVI Carnaro	Ilirska Bistrica	26/b Bresa	Klana	Testa d'Orso - Volosca
V - Trieste	XXVI Carnaro	Ilirska Bistrica	26/c Mattuglie	Matulji	Testa d'Orso - Volosca
V - Trieste	XXVII Fiume			Rijeka	Borgo Marina - Monte Calvario
Zara				Zadar	Province of Zara - Dalmatia

Three artillery regiments supported the sectors of the Vallo alpino orientale:

- 9th Guardia alla Frontiera Artillery Regiment, in Gorizia
- 10th Guardia alla Frontiera Artillery Regiment, in Trieste
- 12th Guardia alla Frontiera Artillery Regiment, in Osoppo

=== In Albania ===
Command	Sector	Sector HQ	Subsectors	Subsector HQ
26° - Tirana	XLI Scutari	Shkodër	41/a Miloti	Pilana
26° - Tirana	XLI Scutari	Shkodër	41/b Bojana	Oblika
26° - Tirana	XLI Scutari	Shkodër	41/c Kopliku	Koplik
26° - Tirana	XLI Scutari	Shkodër	Coastal Subsector San Giovanni di Medua	Shëngjin
26° - Tirana	XLI Scutari	Shkodër	Coastal Subsector Durazzo	Durrës
26° - Tirana	XLII Scutari	Shkodër	42/a	
26° - Tirana	XLII Scutari	Shkodër	42/b	
26° - Tirana	XLIII Kossovo	Kukës	43/a	Kukës
26° - Tirana	XLIII Kossovo	Kukës	43/b	
26° - Tirana	XLIV Laghi	Piskupat	44/a	Piskupat
26° - Tirana	XLIV Laghi	Piskupat	44/b	
26° - Tirana	XLV Librazhd	Librazhd	45/a Fieri	Fier
26° - Tirana	XLV Librazhd	Librazhd	45/b Ciamuria	Librazhd

One artillery regiment supported the 26th Command in Albania:

- 13th Guardia alla Frontiera Artillery Regiment, in Tirana

=== In Libya ===
==== Libyan-Tunisian border ====
Command	Sector	Sector HQ	Subsectors	Subsector HQ
20° - Tripoli	XXVIII Zuara	Zuwarah	28/a	Sidi Milad
20° - Tripoli	XXVIII Zuara	Zuwarah	28/b	Regdalin
20° - Tripoli	XXVIII Zuara	Zuwarah	28/c	Sidi abd es Samad
20° - Tripoli	XXIX Nalut	Nalut	29/a	Ain el Ghezaia
20° - Tripoli	XXIX Nalut	Nalut	29/b	Ras el Reab
20° - Tripoli	XXIX Nalut	Nalut	Autonomous Subsector Uadi Hammar	Uadi Hammar
Tripoli Military Garrison	XXXIII Tripoli Ovest	Tripoli	33/a	Sidi Bilal
Tripoli Military Garrison	XXXIII Tripoli Ovest	Tripoli	33/b	C. Lupini
Tripoli Military Garrison	XXXIII Tripoli Ovest	Tripoli	33/c	C. Sottocasa
Tripoli Military Garrison	XXXIV Tripoli Est	Tripoli	34/a	Bir ben Milad
Tripoli Military Garrison	XXXIV Tripoli Est	Tripoli	34/b	Al-Khums
Tripoli Military Garrison	XXXV Tripoli Sud	Tripoli	35/a	Castel Benito
Tripoli Military Garrison	XXXV Tripoli Sud	Tripoli	35/b	Bir Langar
Tripoli Military Garrison	XXXV Tripoli Sud	Tripoli	35/c	Suani ben Adem
Tripoli Military Garrison	XXXVI Tripoli Sud Est	Tripoli	36/a	
Tripoli Military Garrison	XXXVI Tripoli Sud Est	Tripoli	36/b	

One artillery regiment supported the units arrayed on the Libyan-Tunisian border:

- 14th Guardia alla Frontiera Artillery Regiment, in Tripoli

==== Libyan-Egyptian border ====
Command	Sector	Sector HQ	Subsectors	Subsector HQ
31° - Bardia	XXX Bardia	Bardia	30/a Sud	Fort Capuzzo
31° - Bardia	XXX Bardia	Bardia	30/b Centro	Jaghbub
31° - Bardia	XXX Bardia	Bardia	30/c Nord	Ponticelli
Tobruk Military Garrison	XXXI Ras el Meduar	Tobruk	31/a	
Tobruk Military Garrison	XXXI Ras el Meduar	Tobruk	31/b	
Tobruk Military Garrison	XXXII Sidi Daud	Tobruk	32/a	
Tobruk Military Garrison	XXXII Sidi Daud	Tobruk	32/b	

==== Libyan Sahara ====
G.a.F. Command	Sector	Sector HQ
Libyan Sahara Troops Command - Kufra	Gadames	Ghadames
Libyan Sahara Troops Command - Kufra	Serdeles	Ghat
Libyan Sahara Troops Command - Kufra	Cufra	Kufra

== See also ==
- Alpine Wall
