= Piz da las Trais Linguas =

Mountain in Switzerland

- Dreisprachenspitze (German); Cima Garibaldi (Italian)
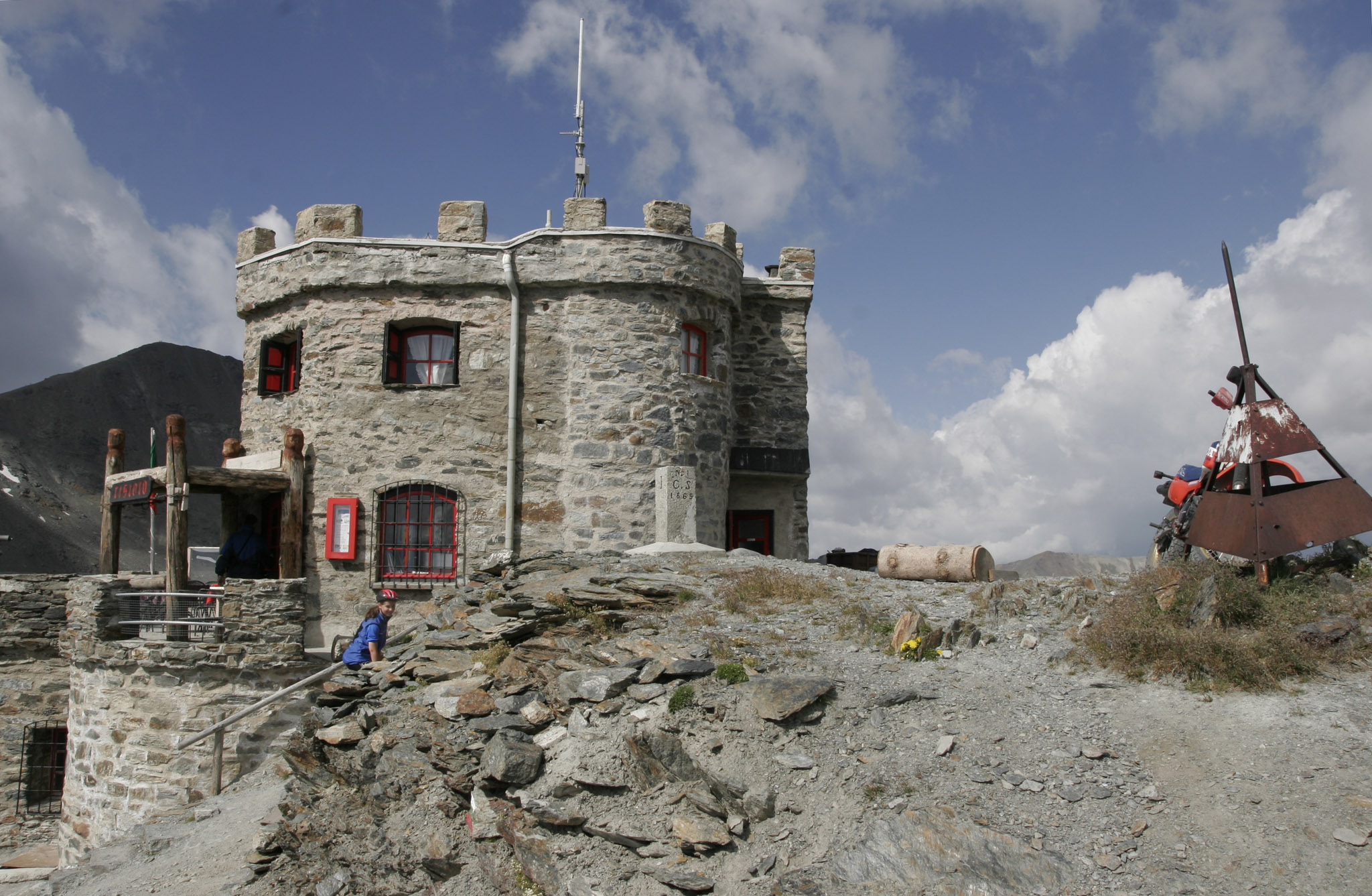
- Garibaldi Hut on the summit

Highest point
- Elevation: 2,843 m (9,327 ft)
- Prominence: less than 20 m
- Parent peak: Piz Cotschen/Rötlspitz
- Coordinates: 46°31′54.8″N 10°27′07.8″E

Geography
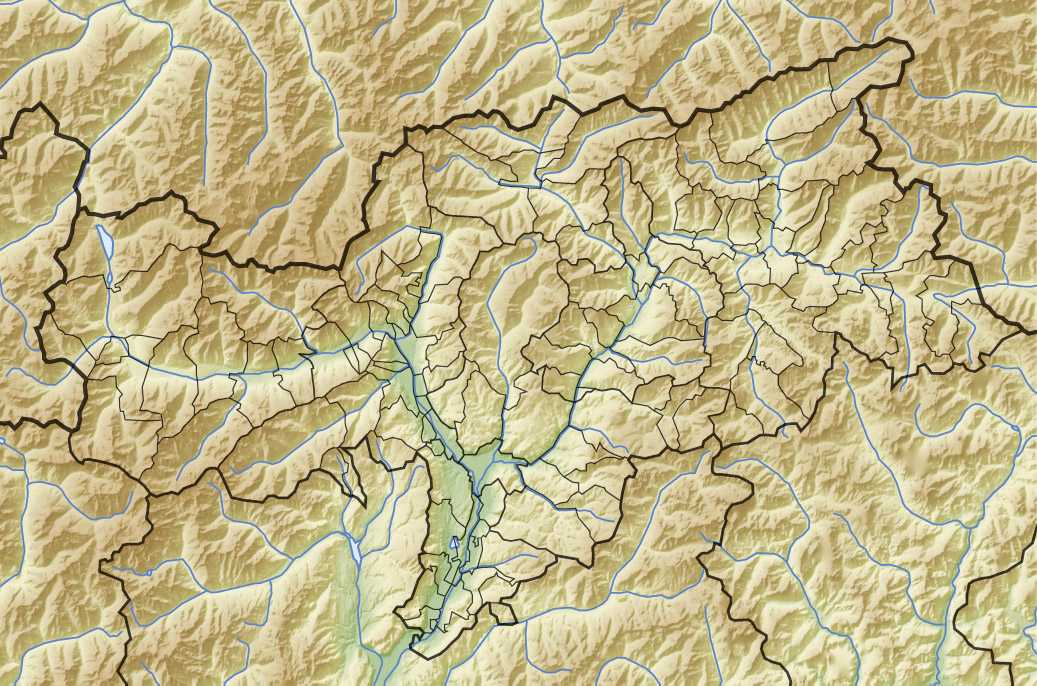
- Location within Alps Location within Switzerland Location within South Tyrol
- Location: Graubünden, Switzerland; Lombardy/South Tyrol, Italy
- Parent range: Ortler Alps

Piz da las Trais Linguas (Romansh: [ˈpits dɐ lɐs trajs ˈliŋwɐs]; German: Dreisprachenspitze; both meaning 'peak of the three languages'; Italian: Cima Garibaldi), is a minor summit of the Ortler Alps, located on the border between Switzerland and Italy. The summit is the tripoint between the Italian regions of Lombardy and South Tyrol and the Swiss canton of Graubünden. Before World War I it was the international tripoint of Switzerland, the Kingdom of Italy and Austria-Hungary. The Romansh and German names refer to the encounter of different linguistic areas in this region. The Italian name refers to Giuseppe Garibaldi, however losing the reference to the meeting of different cultures.

On its southern side the mountain overlooks the Stelvio Pass (German: Stilfserjoch).

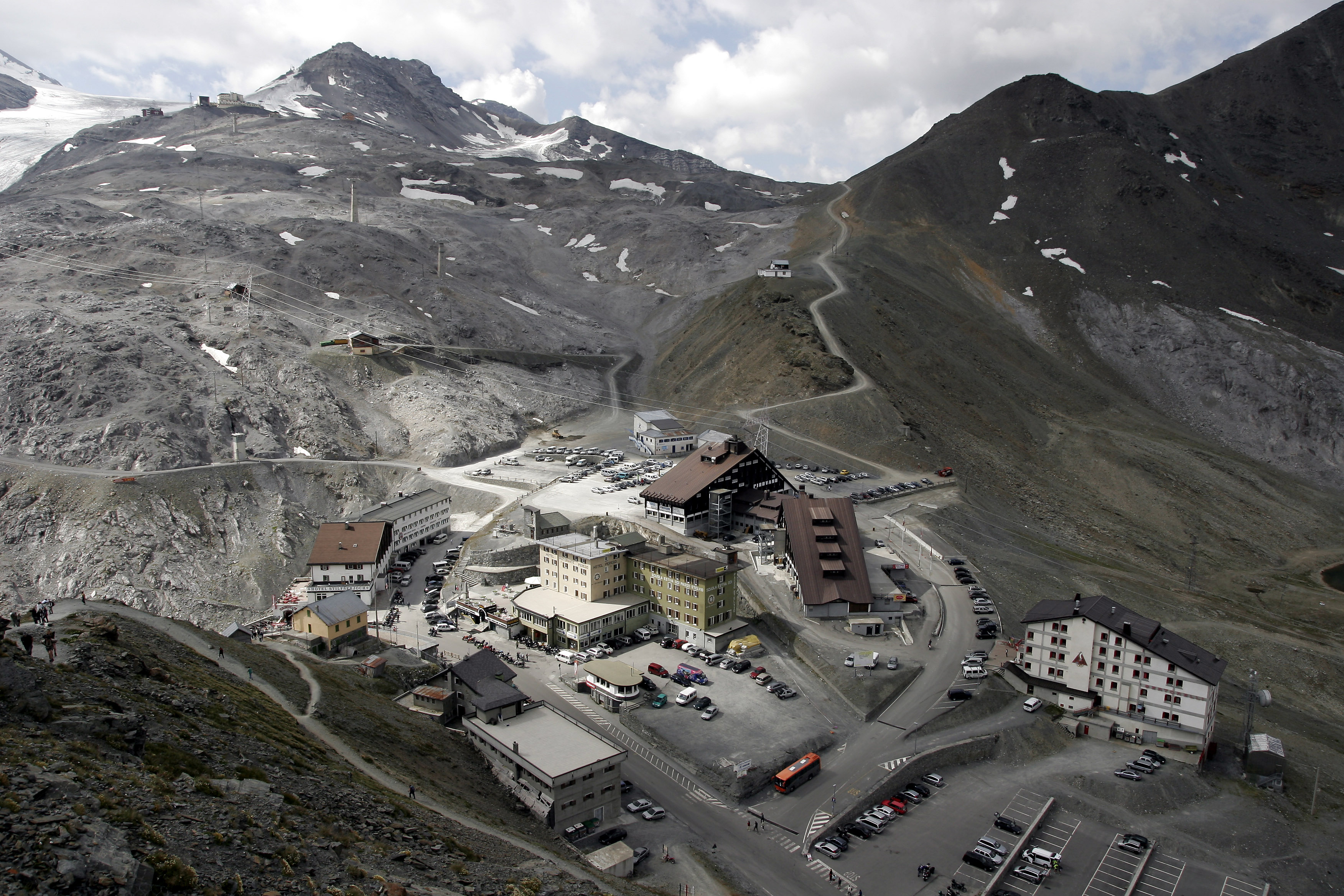
View of Stelvio Pass from the summit
