= Cannone da 149/40 modello 35 =

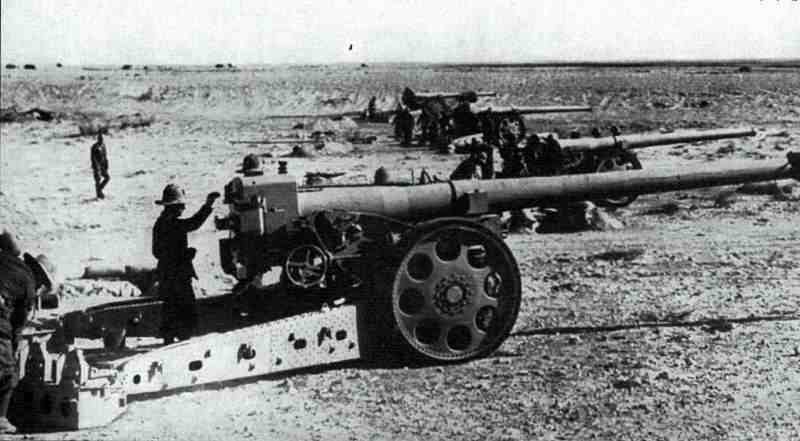
- A battery of 149/40 guns.
- Type: Heavy Gun
- Place of origin: Kingdom of Italy

Service history
- In service: 1940–1945
- Used by: Kingdom of Italy; Nazi Germany
- Wars: World War II

Production history
- Designer: Ansaldo
- Manufacturer: Ansaldo
- Produced: 1940–1944
- No. built: 51 by 1941

Specifications
- Mass: 11,340 kg (25,000 lb)
- Barrel length: Total: 6.360 m (20 ft 10 in) L/42.7; Bore: 5.964 m (19 ft 7 in) L/40
- Crew: 12 Artillerymen
- Shell weight: 45.96 kg (101.32 lb)
- Caliber: 149.1 mm (5.87 in)
- Breech: Wellin Screw
- Recoil: Hydro-pneumatic
- Carriage: Split trail
- Elevation: 0° / +45°
- Traverse: 60°
- Rate of fire: 1–2 rpm
- Muzzle velocity: 800 m/s (2,600 ft/s)
- Maximum firing range: 23,700 m (25,900 yd)

The Cannone da 149/40 modello 35 was a heavy gun which served with Italy during World War II. It was intended to replace the obsolete Cannone da 149/35 A, but the small numbers produced prevented that. By 1940 orders had been placed for 590, but only 51 were in service at the end of September 1941. Weapons captured by the Germans after the Italian surrender in 1943 were put into service as the 15 cm K. 408(i). Ansaldo produced a batch of twelve for the Germans in April 1944.

It was a good design despite the odd decision to use trail spade plates that had to be pounded into the ground to anchor the gun in place. Normally it was broken down into two loads for transport, but it could be further broken down into four loads for mountainous terrain.
