= Mortaio da 210/8 D.S. =

Mortaio da 210/8
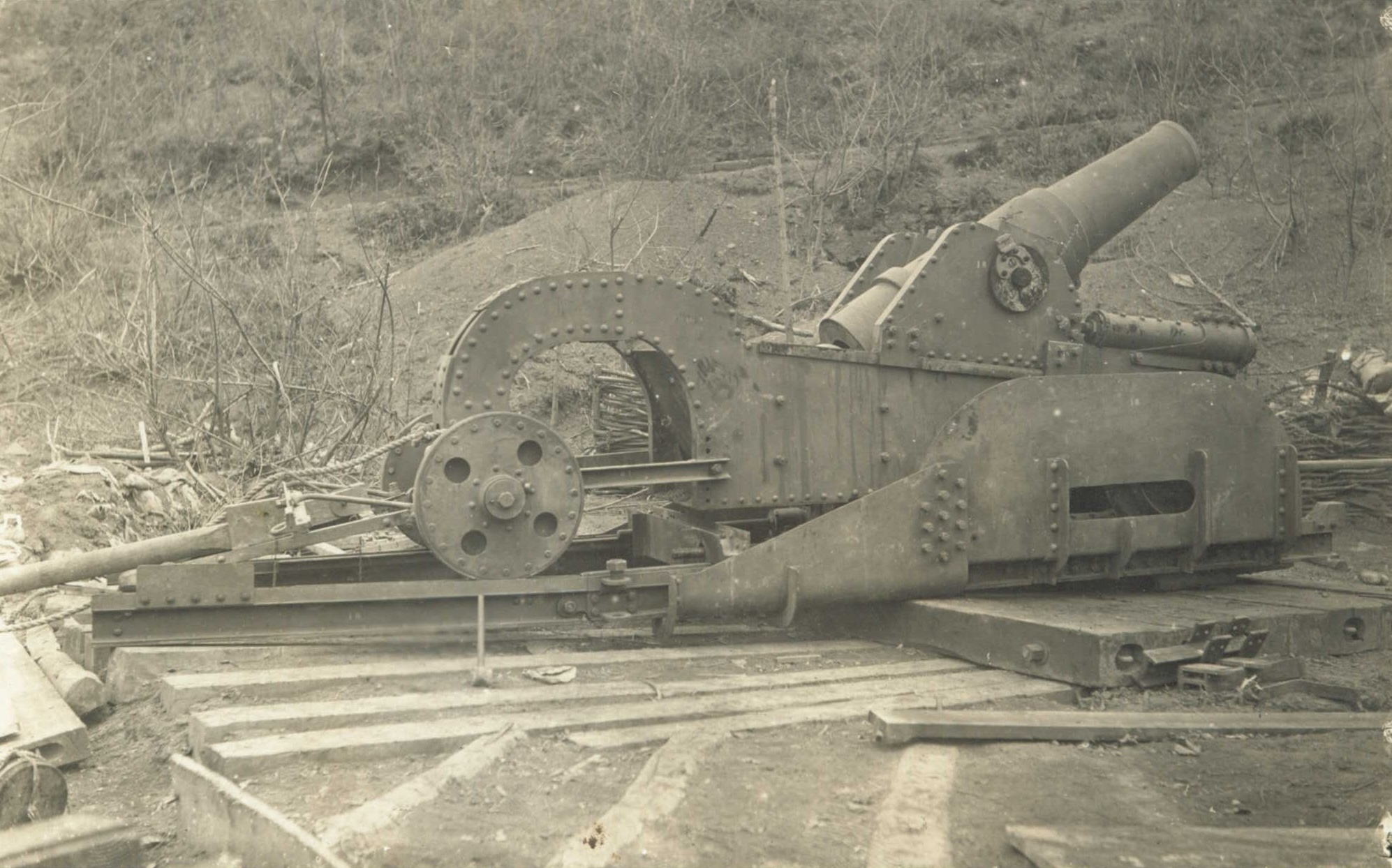
- A Mortaio da 210/8 on a De Stefano carriage
- Type: Siege howitzer
- Place of origin: Kingdom of Italy

Service history
- In service: 1900–1945
- Used by: Kingdom of Italy; Second Polish Republic
- Wars: World War I Polish-Soviet War; World War II

Production history
- Designer: Ansaldo
- Manufacturer: Ansaldo
- Produced: 1900
- Variants: PIAT mount D.A. mount D.S. mount

Specifications
- Mass: 5,500 kg (12,100 lb)
- Barrel length: 2.048 m (6 ft 9 in) L/9.7
- Shell: Separate-loading, bagged charges and projectiles.
- Shell weight: 101.5 kg (224 lb)
- Caliber: 210 mm (8.26 in)
- Breech: Interrupted screw breech
- Recoil: Hydro-gravity
- Carriage: Garrison mounts
- Elevation: -15° to +70°
- Traverse: 360°
- Rate of fire: 1 round per 7–8 minutes
- Muzzle velocity: 340 m/s (1,115 ft/s)
- Maximum firing range: 8.4 km (5.2 mi)

The Mortaio da 210/8 was a siege howitzer which served with Italy during World War I and World War II.

== History ==
The Mortaio da 210/8 was a multi-purpose weapon that could be used in a number of roles such as fortress, coastal and siege artillery. Despite the name Mortaio, the weapon was not a mortar, but rather a short-barreled howitzer (a Mörser in German terms). The 210/8 was fairly conventional for its time and most nations had similar weapons such as the Mortier de 220 mm modèle 1880, 8-inch mortar M1877 and 21 cm Mörser 99.

=== World War I ===
The majority of military planners before the First World War were wedded to the concept of fighting an offensive war of rapid maneuver which in a time before mechanization meant a focus on cavalry and light horse artillery firing shrapnel shells. Although the majority of combatants had heavy field artillery prior to the outbreak of the First World War, none had adequate numbers of heavy guns in service, nor had they foreseen the growing importance of heavy artillery once the Italian Front stagnated and trench warfare set in.

Since aircraft of the period were not yet capable of carrying large diameter bombs the burden of delivering heavy firepower fell on the artillery. The combatants scrambled to find anything that could fire a heavy shell and that meant emptying the fortresses and scouring the depots for guns held in reserve. It also meant converting coastal artillery and naval guns to siege guns by either giving them simple field carriages or mounting the larger pieces on rail carriages.

It was in these conditions that the 210/8 was deployed to give the army high-angle heavy firepower they needed to deal with Austro-Hungarian troops who occupied fortified positions in the mountains. The photos in the commons link show a number of 210/8's were captured by Austrian and German forces following the Battle of Caporetto but what use they made of them is unknown.

=== World War II ===
Some 210/8's were still in service during World War II mainly in the coastal defense role, but played little part in the war, never leaving Italy.

== Design ==
The 210/8 was a short barreled breech-loading howitzer. The barrel was a typical built-up gun of the period with reinforcing hoops which was built from steel. The mortar had an interrupted screw breech and it fired separate-loading, bagged charges and projectiles. The 210/8 could be mounted on one of three different garrison mounts.

=== PIAT ===
The PIAT mount consisted of a U-shaped cradle which held the trunnioned barrel and a slightly inclined rectangular metal firing platform with a hydro-gravity recoil system. When the howitzer fired two hydraulic buffers at the sides of the platform slowed the recoil of the cradle which slid up a set of inclined rails and then returned the howitzer to position by the combined action of the buffers and gravity. The firing platform could traverse 30°. For transport, the howitzers on PIAT mounts could be broken down into two wagon loads, one for the howitzer/cradle and another for the wooden base. Each was towed by an artillery tractor and then reassembled for use once a spot had been leveled and the base had been assembled.

=== De Angelis ===
The De Angelis (D.A.) mount consisted of a U-shaped cradle which held the trunnioned barrel and a slightly inclined rectangular metal firing platform with a hydro-gravity recoil system. When the howitzer fired two hydraulic buffers at the sides of the platform slowed the recoil of the cradle which slid up a set of inclined rails and then returned the howitzer to position by the combined action of the buffers and gravity. The firing platform had two small wheels at the front and two larger wheels at the rear which rotated on a crescent-shaped steel rail that was fixed to a wooden base and gave 90° of traverse. For transport, the howitzers on De Angelis mounts could be broken down into two wagon loads, one for the howitzer/cradle and another for the metal firing platform. Each was towed by an artillery tractor and then reassembled for use once a spot had been leveled and the wooden firing base had been assembled.

=== De Stefano ===
The De Stefano (D.S.) carriage consisted of a U-shaped cradle which held the trunnioned barrel. The cradle then sat on top of a 4-wheeled box-trail carriage with two non-steerable wheels at the front and two castering wheels at the rear. The De Stefano carriage had a type of double-recoil system. When the howitzer fired the recoil was partially absorbed by two hydraulic recoil buffers at the front of the cradle with the remaining recoil transmitted to the wheels of the carriage which rolled up a set of inclined steel rails and then back into firing position by gravity.

For travel, the howitzers on De Stefano mounts could be broken down into two loads. A tow bar could was attached to the castoring wheels on the rear of the carriage and towed in one piece by an artillery tractor. The wheels could be fitted with detachable grousers designed by the Italian major Crispino Bonagente for traction on soft ground and these consisted of eight rectangular plates connected with elastic links and are visible in many photographs of World War I artillery from all of the combatants. The second wagon load was for the wooden base and the steel rails for the firing platform. This was also towed by an artillery tractor and then reassembled once a spot had been leveled and the wooden firing base had been assembled. The wooden base and rails allowed 360° of traverse. This same basic De Stefano carriage was scaled to mount a variety of large caliber fortress, coastal and naval artillery pieces as large as 305 mm (12 in).

== Photo Gallery ==
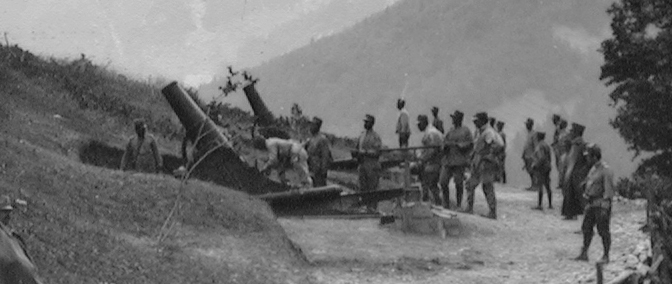
210/8 D.A. mortars in the Val Dogna during World War I.

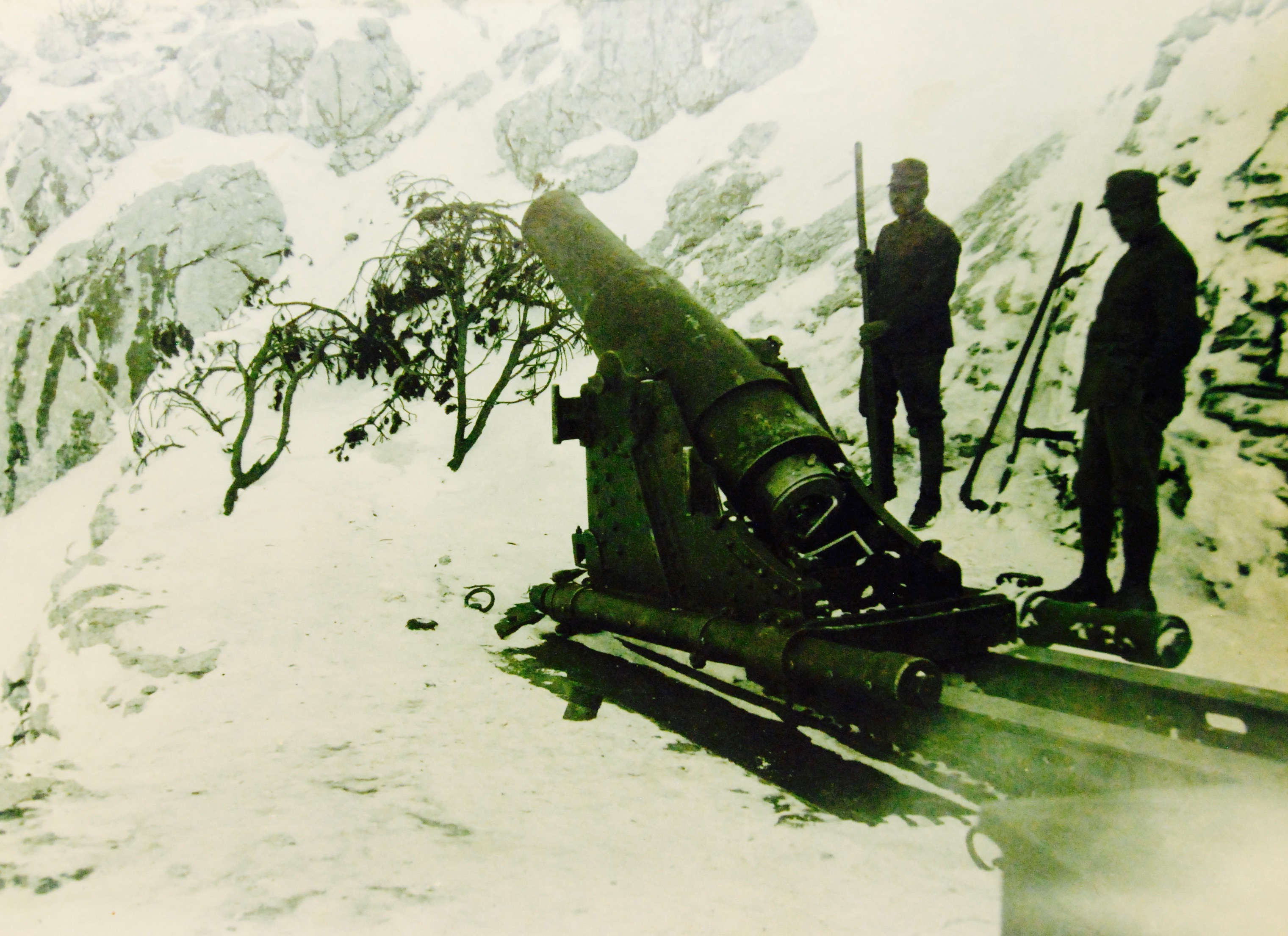
The details of the D.A mount.

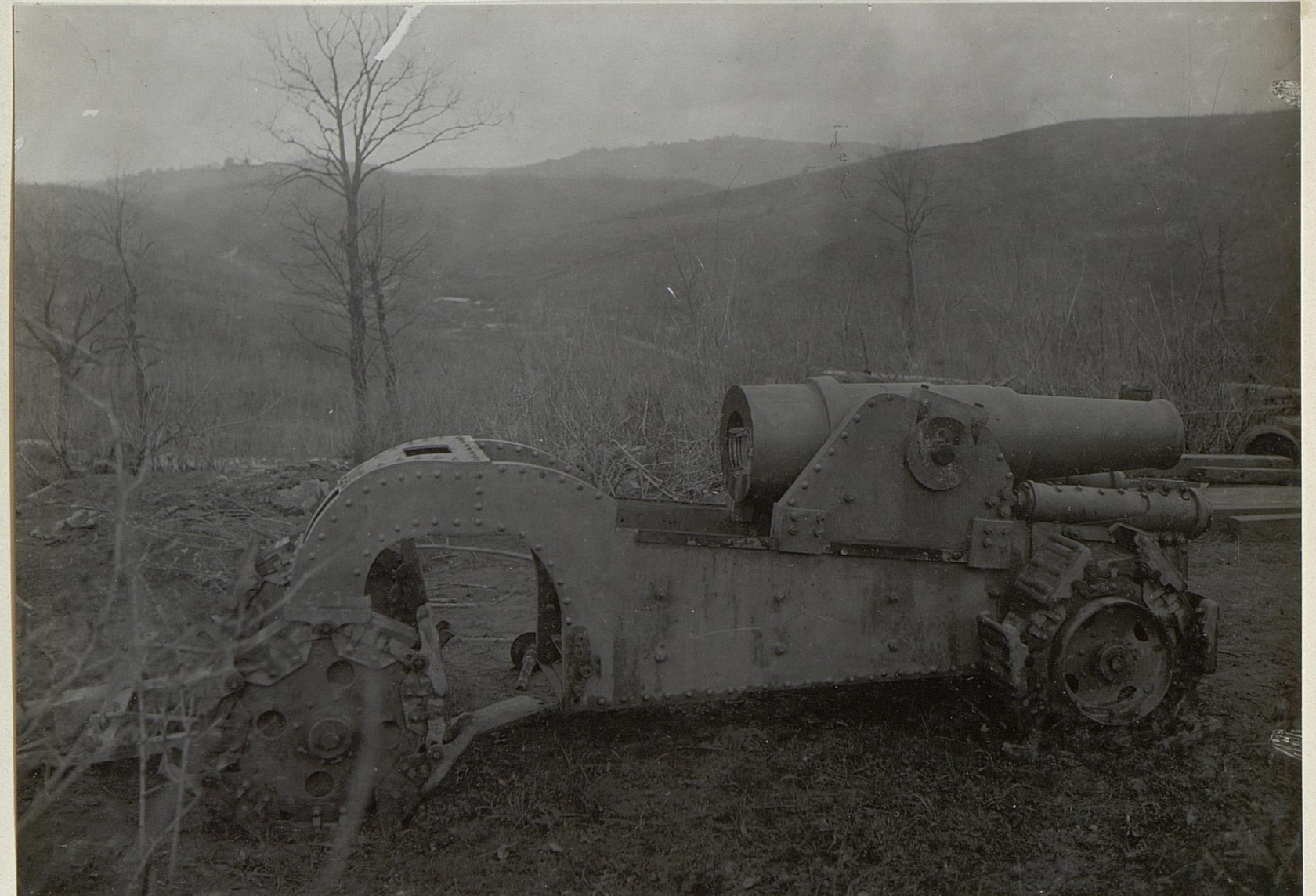
A 210/8 D.S. in traveling position with Bonagente groussers that was captured after the Battle of Caporetto.

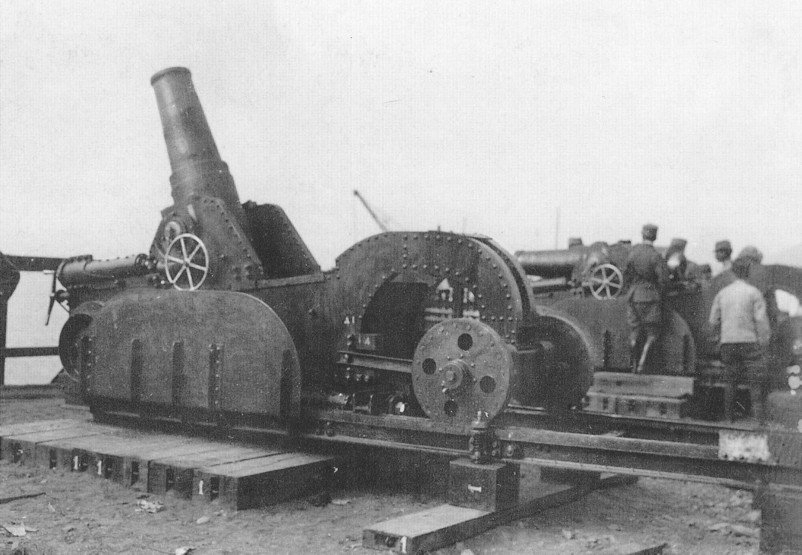
The details of the D.S mount.

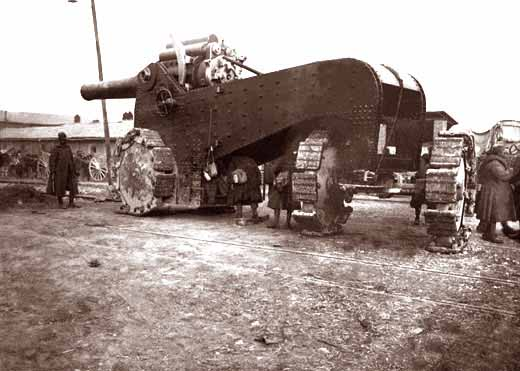
An Obice da 305/17 on a De Stefano carriage. Notice the similarity in concept.
