= Longare =

- Comune
- Comune di Longare
- Location within Italy Location within Veneto
- Coordinates: 45°29′N 11°37′E
- Country: Italy
- Region: Veneto
- Province: Vicenza (VI)
- Frazioni: Bugano, Costozza, Lumignano, Secula

Area
  - Total: 22 km^{2} (8.5 sq mi)

Population (28 February 2007)
  - Total: 5,544
  - Density: 250/km^{2} (650/sq mi)
- Time zone: UTC+1 (CET)
  - Summer (DST): UTC+2 (CEST)
- Postal code: 36023
- Dialing code: 0444
- ISTAT code: 024051
- Website: Official website

Longare is a town in the province of Vicenza, Veneto, Italy. It is on the intersection of SP247 and SP20.

== Sources ==
- (Google Maps)
