= 15 cm Autokanone M. 15/16 =

Heavy field gun used by Austria-Hungary in World War I

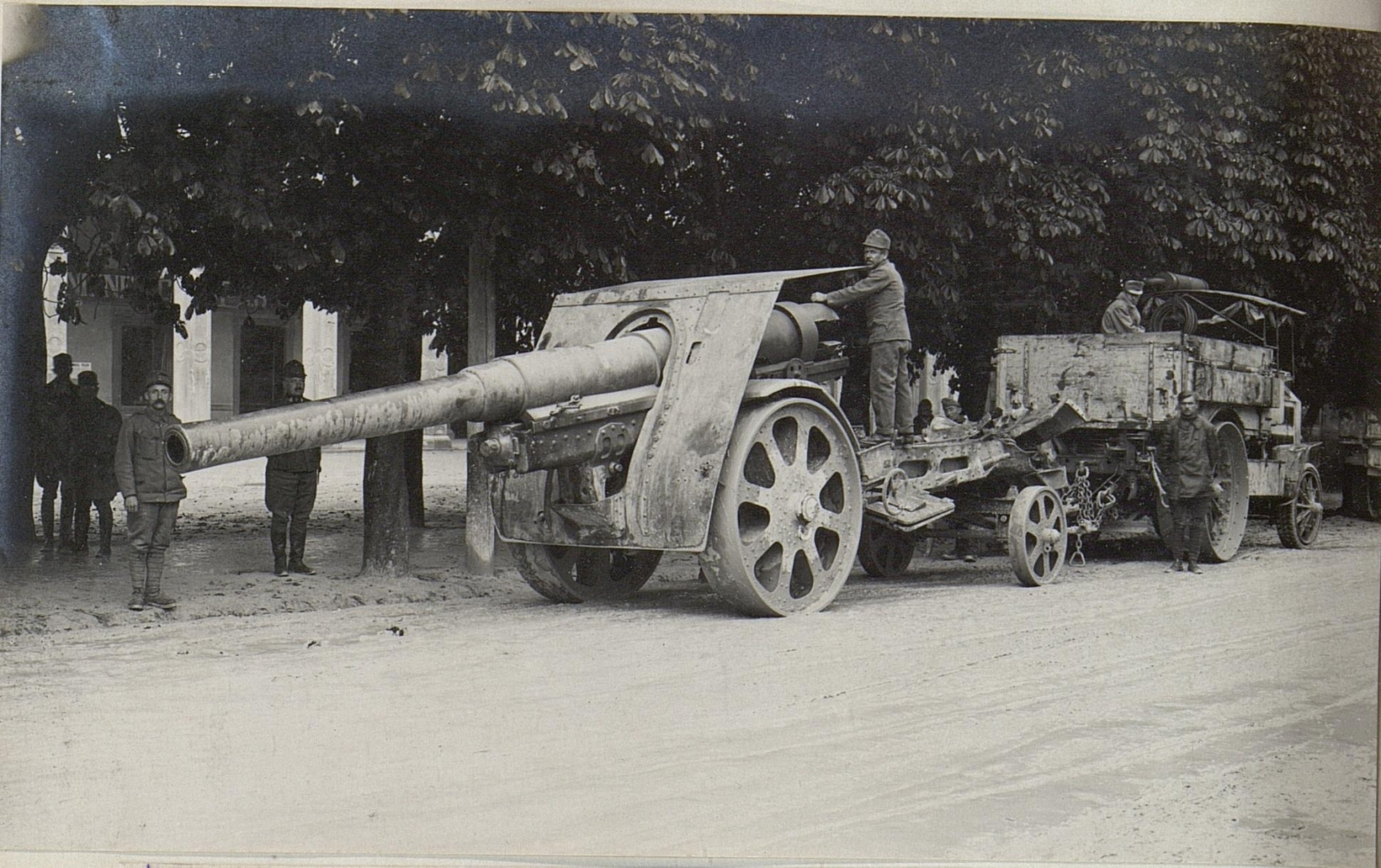
- A 15 cm Autokanone M. 15/16 at Vittorio Veneto in 1918
- Type: Heavy field gun
- Place of origin: Austria-Hungary

Service history
- In service: 1916–1945
- Used by: Austria-Hungary; First Austrian Republic; Czechoslovakia; Nazi Germany; Kingdom of Italy
- Wars: World War I World War II

Production history
- Designer: Skoda
- Designed: 1913–16
- Manufacturer: Skoda
- Produced: 1916–18
- No. built: 44
- Variants: 15 cm Autokanone M. 15

Specifications
- Mass: 11,900 kilograms (26,200 lb)
- Barrel length: 6.0 metres (19 ft 8 in) L/39.5
- Crew: 13
- Shell: separate-loading, cased charge
- Caliber: 152.4 mm (6 in)
- Carriage: box trail
- Elevation: -6° to +45°
- Traverse: 6°
- Rate of fire: 1 rpm
- Muzzle velocity: 692 m/s (2,270 ft/s)
- Effective firing range: 16,000 metres (17,000 yd) (M. 15)
- Maximum firing range: 21,840 metres (23,880 yd) (M. 15/16)

The 15 cm Autokanone M. 15/16 was a heavy field gun used by Austria-Hungary in World War I. Guns turned over to Italy as reparations after World War I were taken into Italian service as the Cannone da 152/37. Austrian and Czech guns were taken into Wehrmacht service after the Anschluss and the occupation of Czechoslovakia as the 15.2 cm K 15/16(t). Italian guns captured after the surrender of Italy in 1943 were known by the Wehrmacht as the 15.2 cm K 410(i). Due to their unique ammunition, the Germans did not use them that much, and generally served on coast-defense duties during World War II.

== Design ==
The M. 15 was a thoroughly conventional design for its day with a box trail, iron wheels and a curved gunshield. It was notable as being the first Austro-Hungarian gun to be designed for motor transport, towed behind the M 17 'Goliath' artillery tractor, hence the Autokanone designation. For transport the barrel was generally detached from the recoil system and moved on its own trailer. The original M. 15 weapons had a maximum elevation of only 30°, but an elevation of 45° was demanded early in the gun's production run, mainly to engage high-altitude targets in the mountains. 27 M. 15 guns were completed before production switched to the improved M. 15/16 with greater elevation in the first half of 1917. A total of 44 barrels and 43 carriages were completed by the end of the war.

It seems likely that surviving M. 15 guns were rebuilt after the war to M. 15/16 standards. During the Twenties, guns in Italian service were relined and given new wheels by Vickers-Terni. In June 1940 Italy had 29 Cannone da 152/37 in service. By the time of the Italian capitulation this number had declined to 17.

== Photo Gallery ==
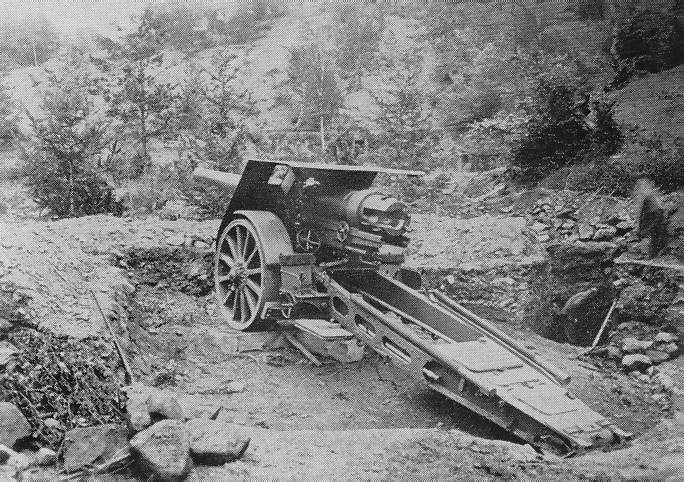

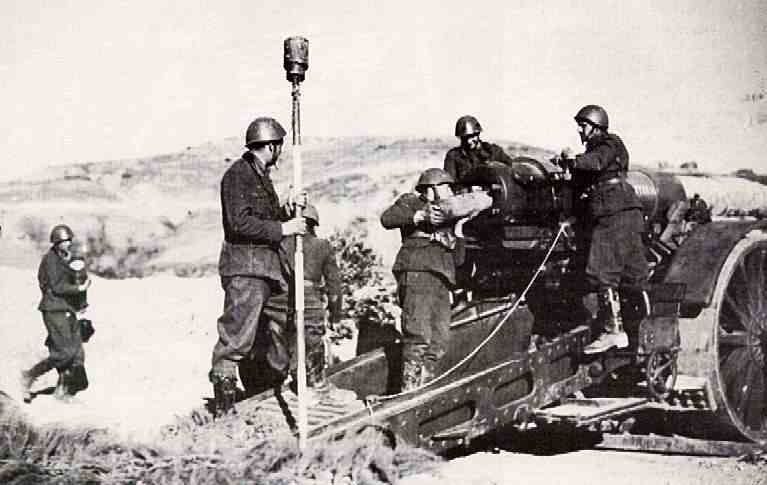

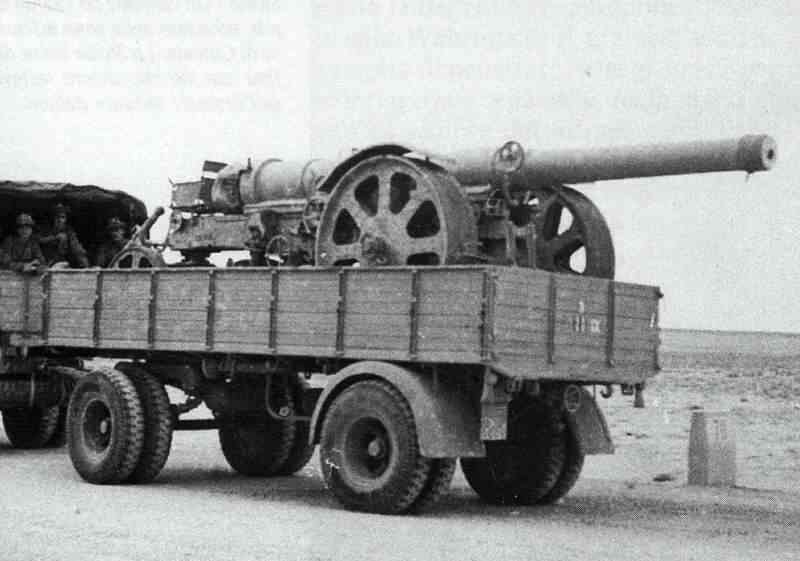

== Bibliography ==
- Chamberlain, Peter & Gander, Terry. Heavy Artillery. New York: Arco, 1975 ISBN 0-668-03898-5
- Gander, Terry and Chamberlain, Peter. Weapons of the Third Reich: An Encyclopedic Survey of All Small Arms, Artillery and Special Weapons of the German Land Forces 1939-1945. New York: Doubleday, 1979 ISBN 0-385-15090-3
- Ortner, M. Christian. The Austro-Hungarian Artillery From 1867 to 1918: Technology, Organization, and Tactics. Vienna, Verlag Militaria, 2007 ISBN 978-3-902526-13-7
