= Cannone da 149/35 A =

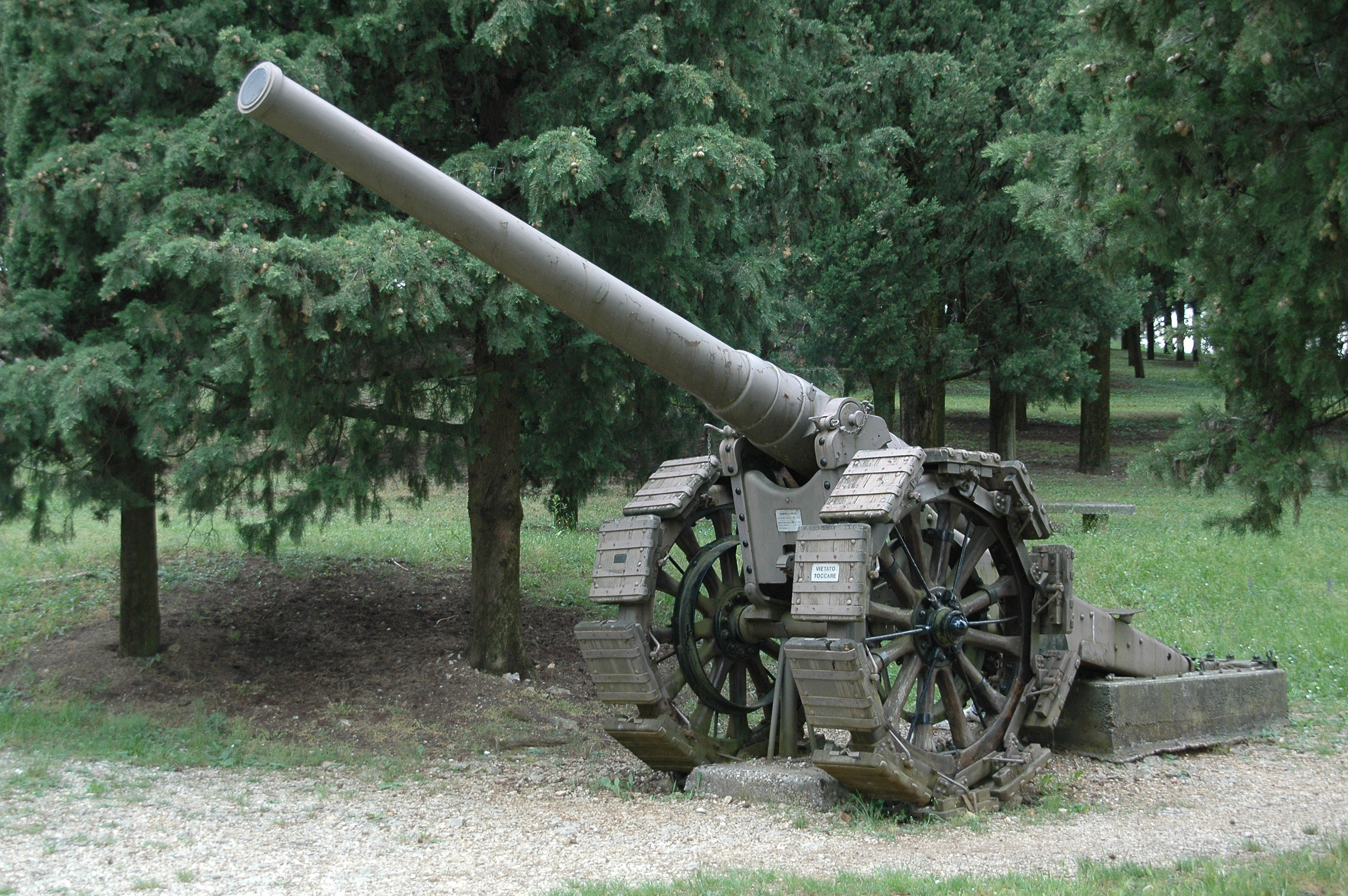
- A cannone da 149/35 A in Redipuglia
- Type: Heavy gun
- Place of origin: Italy

Service history
- In service: 1900–1945
- Used by: Italy
- Wars: World War I, World War II

Production history
- No. built: unknown; 870 guns available in June 1940 (plus 28 in fixed armored turrets)

Specifications
- Mass: 8,220 kilograms (18,120 lb)
- Barrel length: 5.722 metres (18.77 ft) L/38.7
- Shell: 45.96 kilograms (101.3 lb)
- Caliber: 149.1 mm (5.87 in)
- Recoil: none
- Carriage: Box trail
- Elevation: –10° to +35°
- Traverse: 0°
- Rate of fire: 1 rpm
- Muzzle velocity: 651 m/s (2,136 ft/s)
- Maximum firing range: 16,500 metres (18,000 yd)

The Cannone da 149/35 A was a heavy gun which served with Italy during World War I and World War II. It was already an old-fashioned weapon when introduced around 1900. It lacked a recoil system of any kind and could not traverse. The gun recoiled up two ramps placed behind the wheels and had to be re-laid after every shot. Wheel plates were added to absorb more recoil energy and to help the gun cross soft ground. Despite these serious drawbacks, being cheap and easy to manufacture, the gun was produced in large numbers and saw extensive use during World War I. Some 895 were still in Italian service in June 1940 and saw use in World War II in Italy and North Africa, as well for coastal defense in France and the Balkans. Weapons captured by the Germans after the Italian surrender in 1943 seem to have been scrapped or ignored as there is no record of them in German service.

The 149/35 was intended to replace the older Cannone da 149/23 which had been introduced in the Italian army in 1882.
