= Army Aviation Brigade (Italy) =

- Brigata Aviazione dell'Esercito
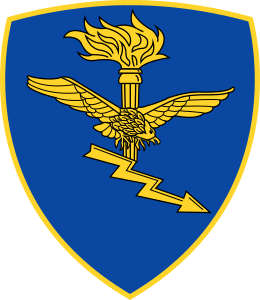
- Coat of Arms of the Army Aviation Brigade
- Active: 2001 - 2023
- Country: Italy
- Branch: Italian Army
- Size: Brigade
- Part of: Army Aviation Command
- Garrison/HQ: Viterbo
- Motto(s): Ubique Celere ("Everywhere rapidly")

Army Aviation locations 2022:
Flying units Support units

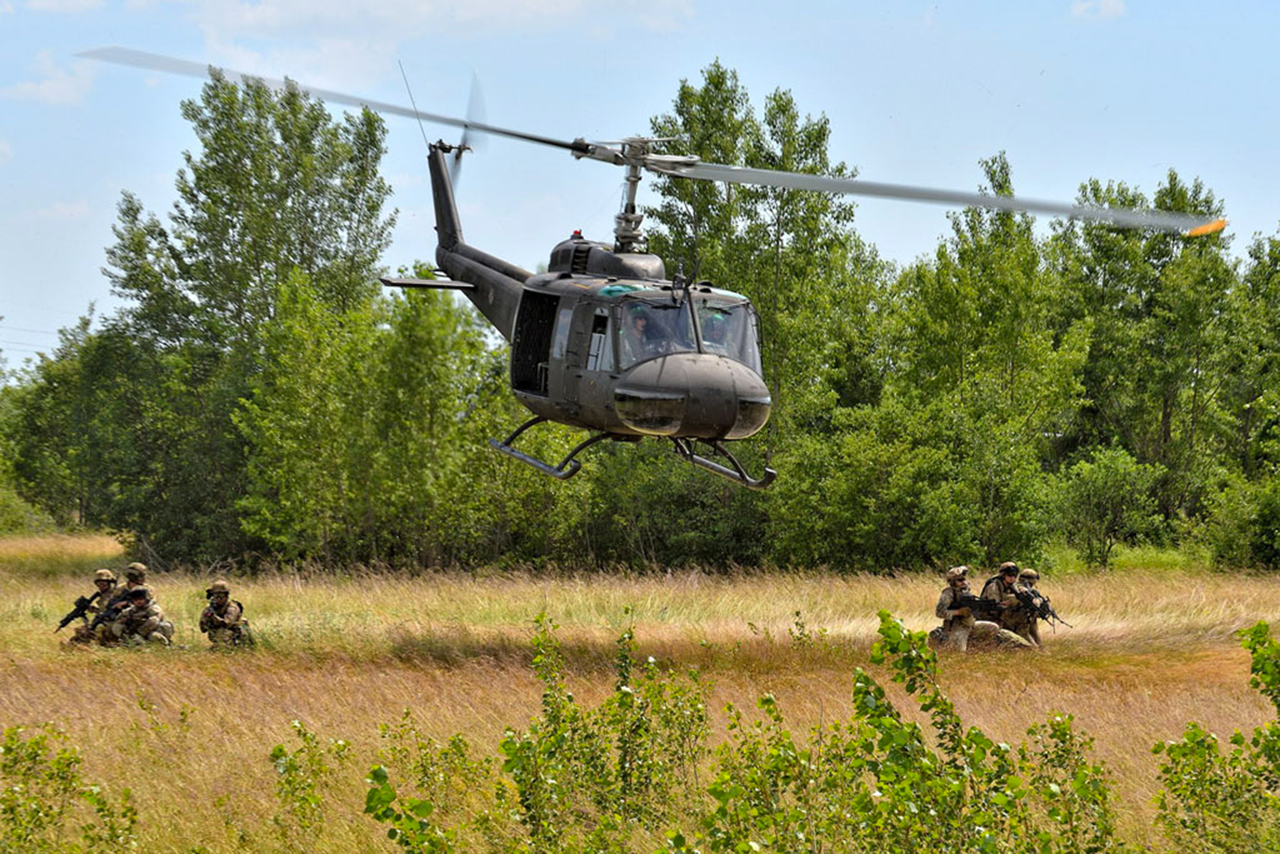
Army Aviation AB 205 helicopter

The Army Aviation Brigade was the Italian Army's aviation brigade. Four of the army's six aviation regiments were part of the brigade, while two aviation regiments were part of the Airmobile Brigade "Friuli". On 1 October 2023 the brigade was merged into the Airmobile Brigade "Friuli".

== History ==
The unit was founded in 2001 as Air Cavalry Grouping with the 1st Air Cavalry Regiment "Antares", 2nd Air Cavalry Regiment "Sirio", 4th Air Cavalry Regiment "Altair", 28th Squadrons Group "Tucano", and the Squadrons Group So.A.T.C.C. "Dragone" (Surveillance, Target Acquisition, Signals, Command and Control Group).

In 2003 the aviation units left the cavalry arm and became a distinct corps of the army, therefore the Grouping was renamed Army Aviation Grouping, which was changed on 1 March 2006 to Army Aviation Brigade. On the same date the Squadrons Group So.A.T.C.C. was disbanded. On 10 November 2014 the 26th Squadrons Group "Giove" left the 1st Army Aviation Regiment "Antares" and was reorganized as 3rd Special Operations Helicopter Regiment "Aldebaran" on the same day.

== Organization ==
Before being disbanded on 1 October 2023 the brigade was organized as follows:

- Army Aviation Brigade, at Viterbo Airport (Lazio)
  - Command and Tactical Support Unit, at Viterbo Airport (Lazio)
  - 1st Army Aviation Regiment "Antares", at Viterbo Airport (Lazio)
    - 11th Squadrons Group "Ercole" with CH-47F "Chinook"
    - 28th Squadrons Group "Tucano", at Viterbo Airport (Lazio)
      - Regional Transport and Liaison Planes Squadron, with P180 Avanti II planes
      - Light Transport and Liaison Planes Squadron, with Dornier 228-212 planes
      - UAV squadron, with RQ-7 Shadow 200 drones
    - Support Squadrons Group
  - 2nd Army Aviation Regiment "Sirio", at Lamezia Terme Airport (Calabria)
    - Command and Logistic Support Squadron
    - 21st Detachment "Orsa Maggiore", at Elmas Airport (Sardinia) with AB 412
    - 30th Squadrons Group "Pegaso", at Lamezia Terme Airport, with AB 212 and AB 412
    - Maintenance Squadron
  - 4th Army Aviation Regiment "Altair", at Bolzano Airport (South Tyrol)
    - Command and Logistic Support Squadron
    - 34th Detachment "Toro", at Venaria Reale Airport (Piedmont) with AB 205A
    - 54th Squadrons Group "Cefeo", at Bolzano Airport, with AB 205A
    - Maintenance Squadron
