= 4th Army Aviation Regiment "Altair" =

Active Italian Army helicopter unit

- 4° Reggimento Aviazione dell'Esercito "Altair"
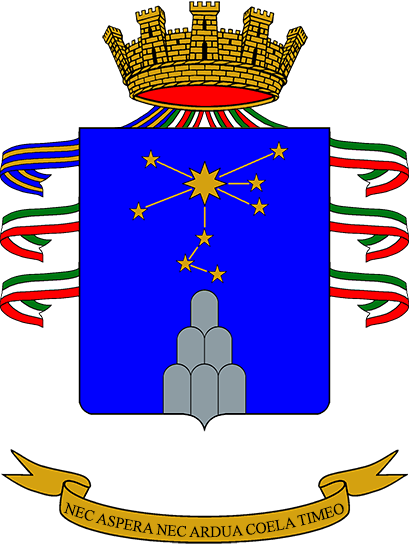
- Regimental coat of arms highlighting Altair within the constellation Aquila
- Active: 20 Jan. 1976 — today
- Country: Italy
- Branch: Italian Army
- Type: Army Aviation
- Part of: Airmobile Brigade "Friuli"
- Garrison/HQ: Bolzano Airport
- Motto: "Nec aspera nec ardua coela timeo"
- Anniversaries: 10 May 1953 - Founding of the Italian Army Aviation
- Decorations: 1× Bronze Medal of Army Valor; 5× Silver Medals of Civil Valor; 1× Silver Cross of Army Merit; 1× Italian Red Cross Bronze Medal of Merit

Insignia
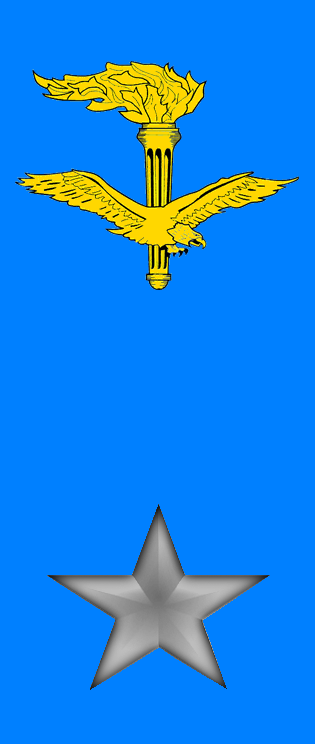
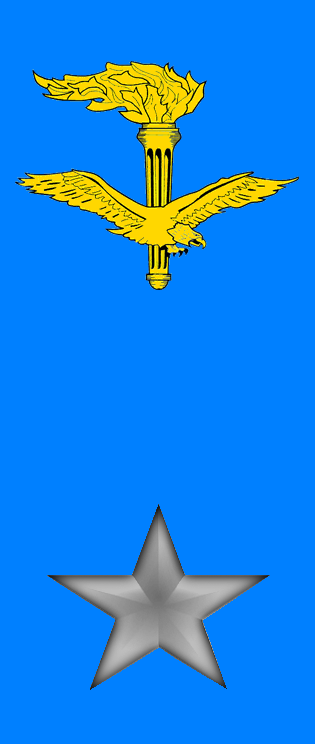
- Army Aviation gorget patches

The 4th Army Aviation Regiment "Altair" (Italian: 4° Reggimento Aviazione dell'Esercito "Altair") is an Italian Army regiment based at Bolzano Airport in South Tyrol. The regiment is part of the army aviation and assigned to the Airmobile Brigade "Friuli". Formed in 1976 as support unit of the IV Alpine Army Corps the regiment has been since then responsible for helicopter operations in the Italian Alps and constitutes, together with the 2nd Army Aviation Regiment "Sirio", the Italian Army's general support aviation capability. The regiment's anniversary falls, as for all Italian Army aviation units, on 10 May 1953, the day the aviation speciality was founded.

== History ==
In January 1958, the following aviation units were formed to support the IV Army Corps, which was responsible for the defense of the Alps:

- Light Aircraft Section, at Belluno Airport for the Alpine Brigade "Cadore"
- Light Aircraft Section, at Venaria Reale Airport for the Alpine Brigade "Taurinense"
- Light Aircraft Section, at Bolzano Airport for the IV Army Corps

In September 1958, the II Helicopters Unit was formed at Bolzano Airport. The airport was also the home of the Light Aircraft Section of the Regiment "Savoia Cavalleria" (3rd). The regiment's Light Aircraft Section had been formed in spring 1956 at the Casale Monferrato Airport and moved, together with regiment, in 1957 from Casale Monferrato to Meran respectively to Bolzano Airport.

In March 1963, the light aircraft sections of the IV Army Corps and Regiment "Savoia Cavalleria" (3rd) merged to form the IV Light Aviation Unit. The same month the II Helicopters Unit was renumbered as IV Helicopters Unit. Both units were assigned to the IV Army Corps and based at Bolzano Airport. In February 1964, the light aviation sections of the two alpine brigades Cadore and Taurinense were expanded to light aviation units. Around the same time the other three brigades of the IV Army Corps also formed light aviation units: the Alpine Brigade "Orobica" at Bolzano Airport, the Alpine Brigade "Tridentina" at Toblach Airport, and the Alpine Brigade "Julia" at Campoformido Airport.

In 1969, the IV Helicopters Unit was renamed IV General Use Helicopters Unit. On 1 August 1971, the Alpine Military School in Aosta formed another Light Aviation Unit at Pollein Airport.

=== Formation ===
During the 1975 Army reform the army reorganized its aviation units and for the first time created aviation units above battalion level. On 20 January 1976, the 4th Army Light Aviation Grouping "Altair" was formed at Bolzano Airport and took command of the following aviation units of the IV Alpine Army Corps:

- IV Light Aviation Unit, which was renamed: 24th Army Light Aviation Squadrons Group "Orione"
- IV General Use Helicopters Unit, which was renamed: 54th Multirole Helicopters Squadrons Group "Cefeo"
- Light Aviation Unit "Cadore" and Light Aviation Unit "Taurinense", which merged to form the 44th Reconnaissance Helicopters Squadrons Group "Fenice"

On 1 June 1976, the Alpine Military School's Light Aviation Unit at Pollein Airport was renamed 545th Multirole Helicopters Squadron and assigned to the 54th Multirole Helicopters Squadrons Group "Cefeo". The remaining aviation units of the 4th Alpine Army Corps were disbanded and their personnel and materiel integrated into the 4th Army Light Aviation Grouping "Altair", respectively the 5th Army Light Aviation Grouping "Rigel".

From 1 June 1976, the grouping was organized as follows:

- 4th Army Light Aviation Grouping "Altair", at Bolzano Airport
  - 24th Army Light Aviation Squadrons Group "Orione", at Bolzano Airport
    - Command and Services Squadron
    - 241st Light Aircraft Squadron (SM.1019A planes)
    - 440th Reconnaissance Helicopters Squadron (AB 206 helicopters)
  - 44th Reconnaissance Helicopters Squadrons Group "Fenice", at Belluno Airport
    - Command and Services Squadron
    - 441st Reconnaissance Helicopters Squadron (AB 206 helicopters)
    - 442nd Reconnaissance Helicopters Squadron, detached to Venaria Reale Airport (AB 206 helicopters)
  - 54th Multirole Helicopters Squadrons Group "Cefeo", at Bolzano Airport
    - Command and Services Squadron
    - 541st Multirole Helicopters Squadron (AB 204B & AB 205 helicopters)
    - 542nd Multirole Helicopters Squadron (AB 204B & AB 205 helicopters)
    - 543rd Multirole Helicopters Squadron (AB 204B & AB 205 helicopters)
    - 544th Multirole Helicopters Squadron, detached to Belluno Airport (AB 204B & AB 205 helicopters)
    - 545th Multirole Helicopters Squadron, detached to Pollein Heliport (AB 204B & AB 205 helicopters)

=== Naming ===
Since the 1975 army reform Italian army aviation units are named for celestial objects: groupings, and later regiments, are numbered with a single digit and named for stars in the 88 modern constellationss. Accordingly, an army aviation regiment's coat of arms highlights the name-giving star within its constellation. Squadron groups were numbered with two digits and named for constellations, or planets of the Solar System. The 4th Army Light Aviation Grouping was named for Altair, which is the brightest star in the constellation Aquila. In 1996, the Italian Army formed army aviation support regiments, which were named to reflect the aviation regiment they supported. Consequently, the army aviation support regiment supporting the 4th Army Aviation Regiment "Altair" was named 3rd Army Aviation Support Regiment "Aquila".

On 14 March 1977, the President of the Italian Republic Giovanni Leone granted with decree 173 the grouping a flag. Since then one Bronze Medal of Army Valor, five Silver Medals of Civil Valor, one Silver Cross of Army Merit, and one Italian Red Cross Bronze Medal of Merit have been awarded to the regiment. These awards have been affixed to the regiments flag and depictions of the medals for Army Valor and Civil Valor were added to the regiment's coat of arms.

=== Cold War ===
On 1 September 1985, the grouping formed the 34th Army Light Aviation Squadrons Group "Toro" at Venaria Reale Airport, which took command of the 442nd Reconnaissance Helicopters Squadron at Venaria Reale Airport and the 545th Multirole Helicopters Squadron at Pollein Heliport. On the same date, the 544th Multirole Helicopters Squadron at Belluno Airport passed from the 54th Multirole Helicopters Squadrons Group "Cefeo" to the 44th Reconnaissance Helicopters Squadrons Group "Fenice", which was renamed 44th Army Light Aviation Squadrons Group "Fenice".

In 1989, the last AB 204B helicopters were retired. On 1 October 1989, the 241st Light Aircraft Squadron was disbanded and the 440th Reconnaissance Helicopters Squadron transferred from the 24th Army Light Aviation Squadrons Group "Orione" to the 54th Army Light Aviation Squadrons Group "Cefeo". On the same date the 24th Army Light Aviation Squadrons Group "Orione" was reorganized as 24th Command and Support Group "Orione". In 1990 the 54th Multirole Helicopters Squadrons Group "Cefeo" was renamed 54th Army Light Aviation Squadrons Group "Cefeo". On 1 September 1991, the 545th Multirole Helicopters Squadron moved from Pollein Heliport to Venaria Reale Airport. On 5 October 1991, the 4th Army Light Aviation Grouping "Altair" was renamed 4th Army Light Aviation Regiment "Altair". At the time the regiment was organized as follows:

- 4th Army Light Aviation Regiment "Altair", at Bolzano Airport
  - 24th Command and Support Group "Orione", at Bolzano Airport
    - Command and Services Squadron
    - Maintenance Squadron
  - 34th Army Light Aviation Squadrons Group "Toro", at Venaria Reale Airport
    - Command and Services Squadron
    - 442nd Reconnaissance Helicopters Squadron (AB 206 helicopters)
    - 545th Multirole Helicopters Squadron (AB 205 helicopters)
  - 44th Army Light Aviation Squadrons Group "Fenice", at Belluno Airport
    - Command and Services Squadron
    - 441st Reconnaissance Helicopters Squadron (AB 206 helicopters)
    - 544th Multirole Helicopters Squadron (AB 205 helicopters)
  - 54th Army Light Aviation Squadrons Group "Cefeo", at Bolzano Airport
    - 440th Reconnaissance Helicopters Squadron (AB 206 helicopters)
    - 541st Multirole Helicopters Squadron (AB 205 helicopters)
    - 542nd Multirole Helicopters Squadron (AB 205 helicopters)
    - 543rd Multirole Helicopters Squadron (AB 205 helicopters)

=== Recent times ===
On 12 June 1993, the 4th Army Light Aviation Regiment "Altair" was renamed 4th Army Aviation Regiment "Altair". On 31 December 1993, the 24th Command and Support Group "Orione" was disbanded. On 5 July 1996, the 44th Army Aviation Squadrons Group "Fenice" was transferred from the 4th Army Aviation Regiment "Altair" to the 7th Attack Helicopters Regiment "Vega". On 20 September 1998, the 542nd and 543rd multirole helicopters squadrons were disbanded.

On 1 June 1999, the Army Aviation was assigned to the Italian Army's Cavalry Arm as a speciality of the arm. Consequently, the 4th Army Aviation Regiment "Altair" was renamed 4th Air Cavalry Regiment "Altair". In 2001, the regiment entered the newly formed Air Cavalry Grouping. On 3 November 2003, the Air Cavalry left the Italian Army's Cavalry Arm and became, as Army Aviation Specialty, a separate speciality of the Italian Army. Consequently, the 4th Air Cavalry Regiment "Altair" was renamed 4th Army Aviation Regiment "Altair", while the Air Cavalry Grouping was renamed Army Aviation Grouping. On 1 March 2006, the Army Aviation Grouping was reorganized and renamed Army Aviation Brigade.

In February 2016, the regiment retired its last AB 206 helicopter and the 34th Army Aviation Squadrons Group "Toro" was reduced to 34th Army Aviation Detachment "Toro". On 1 October 2023, the regiment was assigned, together with all other army aviation regiments, to the Airmobile Brigade "Friuli".

== Organization ==
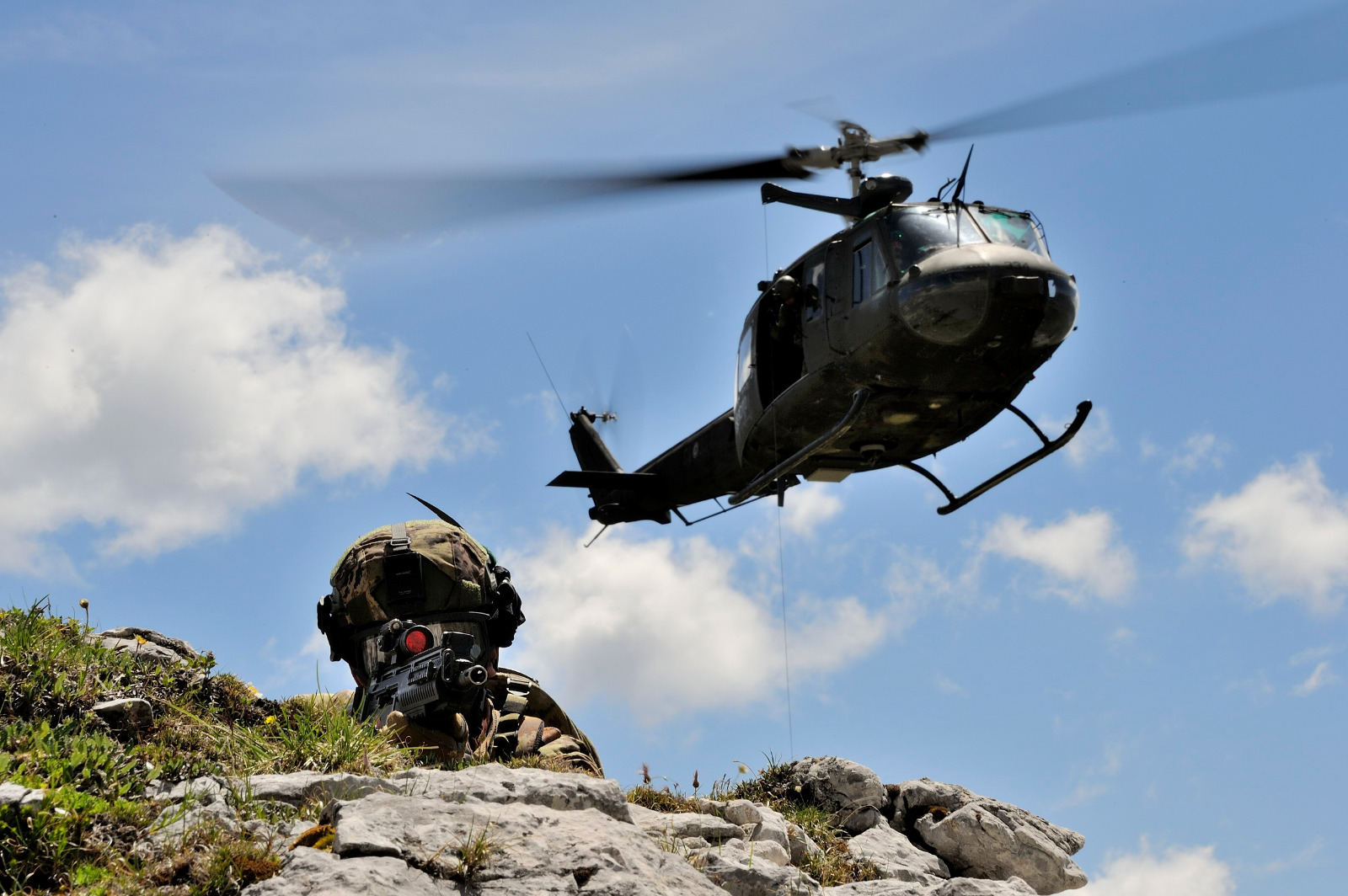
4th Army Aviation Regiment "Altair" AB-205A helicopter in the Dolomites

4th Army Aviation Regiment "Altair" UH-169D helicopter during exercise CAEX II-26

As of 2026 the 4th Army Aviation Regiment "Altair" is organized as follows:

- 4th Army Aviation Regiment "Altair", at Bolzano Airport
  - Command and Logistic Support Squadron, at Bolzano Airport
  - 34th Army Aviation Detachment "Toro", at Venaria Reale Airport
    - Command and Logistic Support Squadron
    - 545th Combat Support Helicopters Squadron
    - Maintenance Squadron
  - 54th Squadrons Group "Cefeo", at Bolzano Airport
    - 440th Combat Support Helicopters Squadron
    - 541st Combat Support Helicopters Squadron
  - Maintenance Squadron, at Bolzano Airport

== Equipment ==
The regiment is equipped with AB 205 helicopters, which are being replaced by UH-169D helicopters.

== See also ==
- Army Aviation
