= 3rd Special Operations Helicopter Regiment "Aldebaran" =

Active Italian Army special forces helicopter unit

- 3° Reggimento Elicotteri per Operazioni Speciali "Aldebaran"
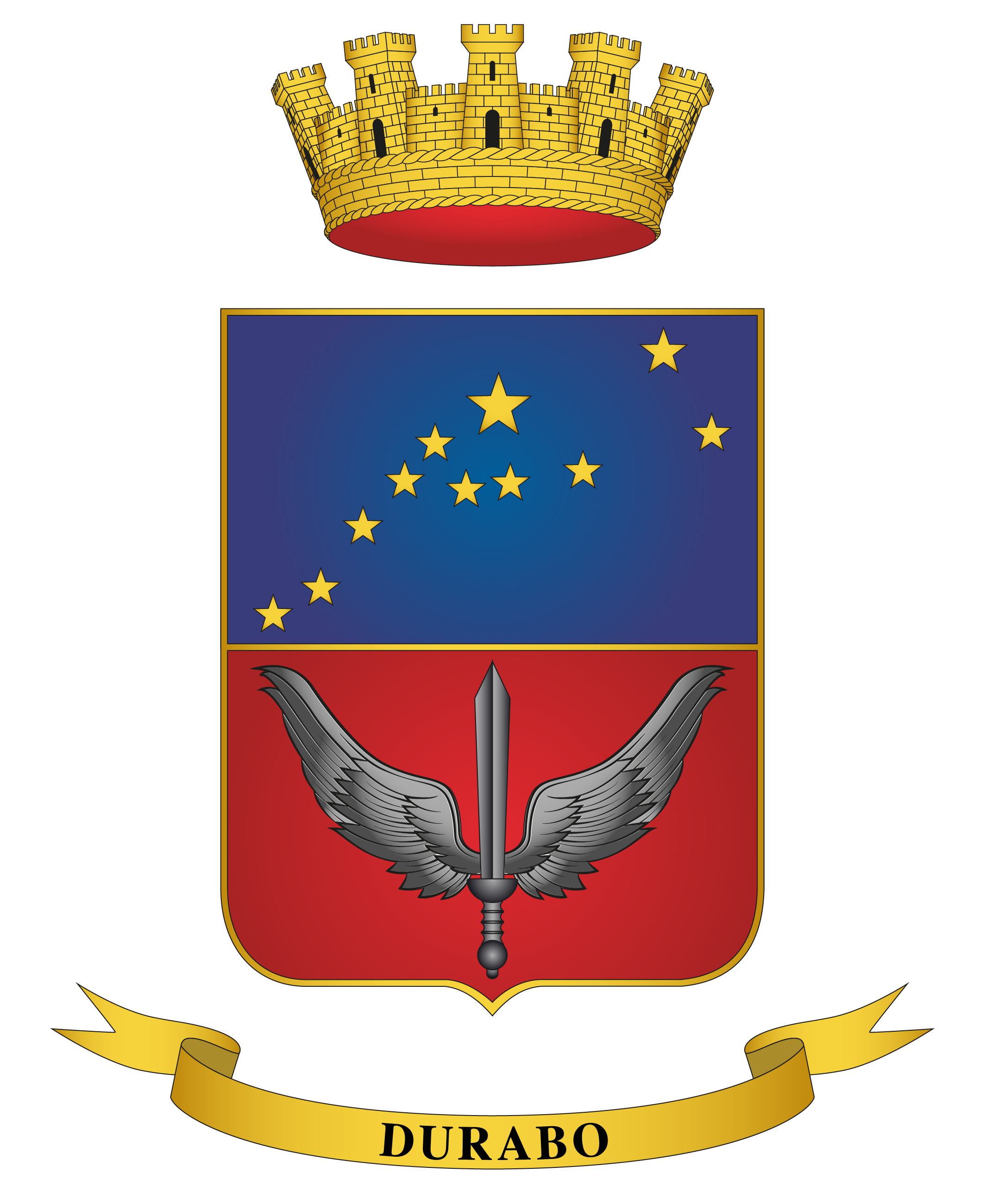
- Regimental coat of arms highlighting Aldebaran within the constellation Taurus
- Active: 15 Dec. 1993 — 1 Sept. 1998; 10 Nov. 2014 — today
- Country: Italy
- Branch: Italian Army
- Type: Army Aviation
- Role: Special Operations
- Part of: Airmobile Brigade "Friuli"
- Garrison/HQ: Viterbo Airport
- Motto: "Durabo" ("I will resist")
- Anniversaries: 10 May 1953 - Founding of the Italian Army Aviation

Insignia
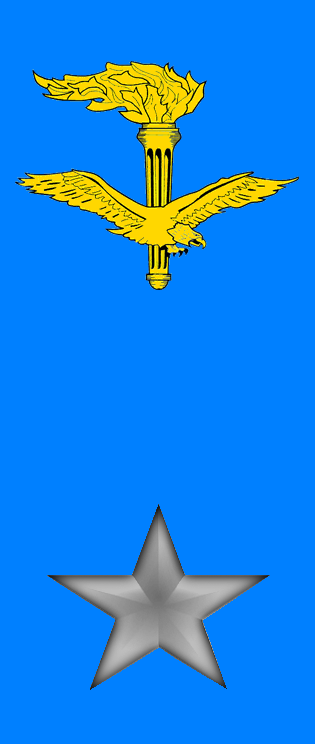
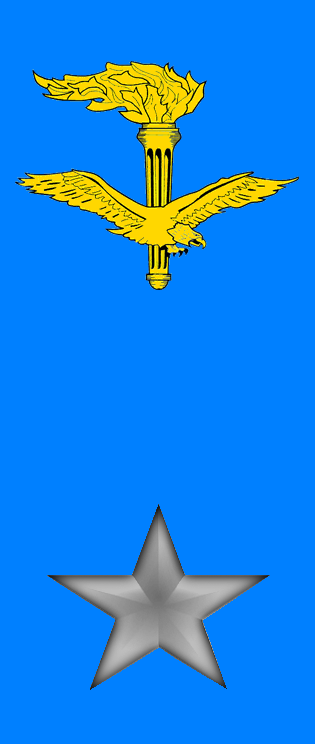
- Army Aviation gorget patches

The 3rd Special Operations Helicopter Regiment "Aldebaran" (Italian: 3° Reggimento Elicotteri per Operazioni Speciali "Aldebaran") is an Italian Army regiment based at Viterbo Airport in Lazio. The regiment is part of the army aviation and assigned to the Airmobile Brigade "Friuli". The regiment supports the special forces and ranger regiments of the Army Special Forces Command. The regiment's anniversary falls, as for all Italian Army aviation units, on 10 May 1953, the day the aviation speciality was founded.

== History ==
On 24 July 1964, the Light Aircraft Section was formed at Alghero–Fertilia Airport in Sardinia. The section was tasked with support the Italian Armed Forces' Special Units Grouping, which guarded military intelligence installations in Sardinia and was tasked with training the direct action personnel of the Italian Armed Forces' intelligence agency SISMI. In 1976, the section was expanded and then renamed 399th Light Aircraft Squadron. In November 1989, the squadron was used to form the 39th Squadrons Group "Drago", which was equipped with AB 412A helicopters.

During the 1975 army reform, the Light Aviation Unit "Folgore" of the Paratroopers Brigade "Folgore" based the at Pisa-San Giusto Air Base was reorganized as 26th Squadrons Group "Giove". During the same reform the 1st Army Light Aviation Grouping "Antares" reorganized its I General Use Helicopters Unit as 51st Multirole Helicopters Squadrons Group "Leone".

On 15 December 1993, the 3rd Army Aviation Regiment "Aldebaran" was formed at Bresso Airport near Milan by reorganizing the 3rd Army Corps' Light Aviation Command. At the time the regiment consisted of a command, a command and services squadron, and the 53rd Squadrons Group "Cassiopea". The "Cassiopeia" squadrons group had moved only recently from Padua Airport to Bresso Airport, where it incorporated the personnel and materiel of the disbanded 23rd Squadrons Group "Eridano". On 15 February 1995, the President of the Italian Republic Oscar Luigi Scalfaro granted the regiment a flag.

On 16 September 1996, the regiment was transferred from the 3rd Army Corps to the Support Units Command "Legnano". On 31 December 1997, the Support Units Command "Legnano" was disbanded and regiment was transferred to the Projection Forces Command. On 1 September 1998, the regiment was disbanded, while the 53rd Squadrons Group "Cassiopeia" moved from Bresso to Miramare Air Base, where the squadrons group joined the 5th Army Aviation Regiment "Rigel". Subsequently, the flag of the 3rd Army Aviation Regiment "Aldebaran" was transferred to the Shrine of the Flags in the Vittoriano in Rome for safekeeping.

In 1999, the 39th Squadrons Group "Drago" in Sardinia was disbanded and its personnel and materiel transferred to Viterbo Airport, where they were used to form the Medium Helicopters Squadron, which was equipped with AB 412A helicopters. On 1 September 2001, the 26th Squadrons Group "Giove" at Pisa-San Giusto Air Base was transferred from the Paratroopers Brigade "Folgore" to the 1st Air Cavalry Regiment "Antares". On 4 November 2002, the 26th Squadrons Group "Giove", 51st Squadrons Group "Leone", and Medium Helicopters Squadron were merged and formed the 26th Air Cavalry Squadrons Group "Giove" — Special Operations Helicopters Unit (Italian: Reparto Elicotteri per Operazioni Speciali - REOS).

The 26th Air Cavalry Squadrons Group "Giove" consisted of a command, a logistic section, a maintenance squadron, and a helicopter squadron equipped with CH-47C Chinook and AB 412A helicopters, which were based at Viterbo Airport, and a detachment at Pisa-San Giusto Air Base equipped with AB 205 helicopters.

On 9 November 2014, the 26th Squadrons Group "Giove" left the 1st Army Aviation Regiment "Antares" and the next day squadrons group entered the newly formed 3rd Special Operations Helicopter Regiment "Aldebaran", which was assigned to the Army Aviation Brigade. The following 19 November, the regiment retrieved the flag of 3rd Army Aviation Regiment "Aldebaran" from the Shrine of the Flags in the Vittoriano in Rome. On 29 January 2015, the flag was paraded in front of the assembled regiment, which then took officially possession of the flag. On 31 December 2015, the detachment in Pisa was disbanded and the remaining AB 205 helicopters assigned to other regiments. On 31 July 2019, the 3rd Special Operations Helicopter Regiment "Aldebaran" was transferred from the Army Aviation Brigade to the Army Aviation Command. On 1 October 2023, the regiment was assigned, together with all other army aviation regiments, to the Airmobile Brigade "Friuli".

== Naming ==
Since the 1975 army reform Italian army aviation units are named for celestial objects: regiments, are numbered with a single digit and named for stars in the 88 modern constellationss. Accordingly, an army aviation regiment's coat of arms highlights the name-giving star within its constellation. Squadron groups were numbered with two digits and named for constellations, or planets of the Solar System. The 3rd Army Aviation Regiment "Aldebaran" was named for Aldebaran, which is the brightest star in the constellation Taurus.

== Organization ==
As of 2024 the 3rd Special Operations Helicopter Regiment "Aldebaran" is organized as follows:

- 3rd Special Operations Helicopter Regiment "Aldebaran"", at Viterbo Airport
  - 26th Army Aviation Squadrons Group "Giove"
    - 261st Medium Transport Helicopters Squadron (CH-47F Chinook)
    - 262nd Combat Support Helicopters Squadron (AB 412A helicopters)
    - 526th Squadron (NH90 helicopters)
  - Maintenance Squadron
  - Logistic Support Squadron
  - Special Operation Forces/Special Forces Crew Formation Center and Training Squadron
  - Forward Operating Base at Pisa Air Base
