= 2nd Army Aviation Regiment "Sirio" =

Active Italian Army helicopter unit

- 2° Reggimento Aviazione dell'Esercito "Sirio"
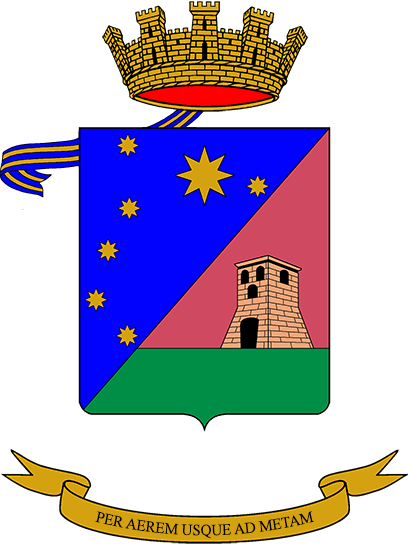
- Regimental coat of arms highlighting Sirius within the constellation Canis Major
- Active: 1 Oct. 1996 — today
- Country: Italy
- Branch: Italian Army
- Type: Army Aviation
- Part of: Airmobile Brigade "Friuli"
- Garrison/HQ: Lamezia Terme Airport
- Motto: "Per aerem usque ad metam"
- Anniversaries: 10 May 1953 - Founding of the Italian Army Aviation
- Decorations: 1× Silver Medal of Army Valor

Insignia
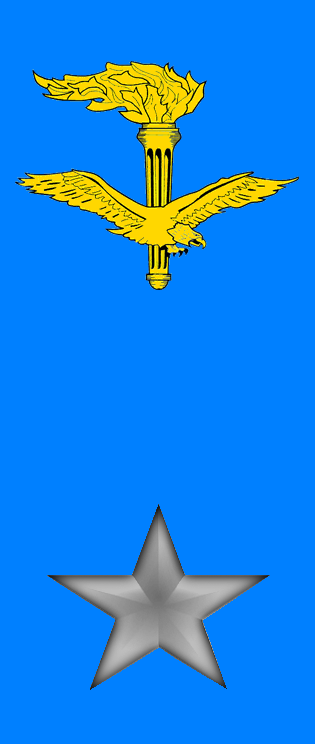
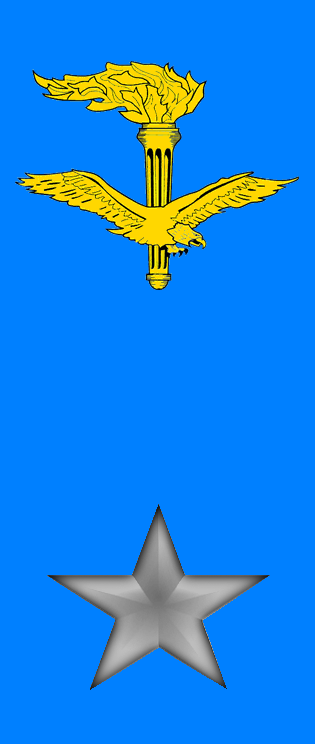
- Army Aviation gorget patches

The 2nd Army Aviation Regiment "Sirio" (Italian: 2° Reggimento Aviazione dell'Esercito "Sirio") is an Italian Army regiment based at Lamezia Terme Airport in Calabria. The regiment is part of the army aviation and assigned to the Airmobile Brigade "Friuli". Formed in 1996 the regiment is responsible for helicopter operations in southern Italy and on the islands of Sicily and Sardinia. The regiment, together with the 4th Army Aviation Regiment "Altair", constitutes the Italian Army's general support aviation capability. The regiment's anniversary falls, as for all Italian Army aviation units, on 10 May 1953, the day the aviation speciality was founded.

== History ==
=== Formation ===
On 1 October 1996, the 12th Army Aviation Squadrons Group "Gru" was reformed at Lamezia Terme Airport and assigned to the 2nd Army Aviation Regiment "Sirio", which was formed on the same day. Furthermore on the same day, the 20th Army Aviation Squadrons Group "Andromeda", which was based at Pontecagnano Airport, was transferred from the Southern Military Region to the 2nd Army Aviation Regiment "Sirio". After its formation the regiment was assigned to the Army Aviation Inspectorate and consisted of the following units:

- 2nd Army Aviation Regiment "Sirio", at Lamezia Terme Airport
  - 12th Army Aviation Squadrons Group "Gru", at Lamezia Terme Airport
    - Command and Services Squadron
    - 121st Multirole Helicopters Squadron (AB 205 helicopters)
    - 122nd Multirole Helicopters Squadron (AB 205 helicopters)
  - 20th Army Aviation Squadrons Group "Andromeda", at Pontecagnano Airport
    - Command and Services Squadron
    - 420th Reconnaissance Helicopters Squadron (AB 206 helicopters)
    - 520th Multirole Helicopters Squadron (AB 205 helicopters)

=== Naming ===
Since the 1975 Army reform Italian army aviation units are named for celestial objects: regiments are numbered with a single digit and named for stars in the 88 modern constellationss. Accordingly, an army aviation regiment's coat of arms highlights the name-giving star within its constellation. Squadron groups were numbered with two digits and named for constellations, or planets of the Solar System. The 2nd Army Aviation Regiment was named for Sirius (Italian: Sirio), which is the brightest star in the constellation Canis Major.

On 18 September 1996, the President of the Italian Republic Oscar Luigi Scalfaro granted the regiment a flag, which since then has been decorated with one Silver Medal of Army Valor, that was awarded to the then autonomous 20th Army Light Aviation Squadrons Group "Andromeda" for its service after the 1980 Irpinia earthquake.

=== Recent times ===
On 1 October 1997, the 30th Army Aviation Squadrons Group "Pegaso" based at Fontanarossa Airport in Sicily was transferred from the Sicily Military Region to the regiment and then moved from Fontanarossa Airport to Lamezia Terme Airport. On the same date, the regiment was transferred from the Aviation Inspectorate to the Southern Military Region. On 30 April 1998, the 12th Army Aviation Squadrons Group "Gru" was disbanded and its personnel and materiel integrated into the 30th Squadrons Group "Pegaso". On the same date, the regiment was transferred from the Southern Military Region to the 2nd Defense Forces Command in Naples.

On 1 June 1999, the Army Aviation was assigned to the Italian Army's Cavalry Arm as a speciality of the arm. Consequently, the 2nd Army Aviation Regiment "Sirio" was renamed 2nd Air Cavalry Regiment "Sirio". On 15 November 2000, the regiment entered the newly formed Air Cavalry Grouping. On 3 April 2001, the 21st Squadrons Group "Orsa Maggiore", which was based at Elmas Airport in Sardinia, was transferred from the Sardinia Military Command to the regiment. On 31 July 2002, the 21st Squadrons Group "Orsa Maggiore" was transferred from the 2nd Air Cavalry Regiment "Sirio" to the Army Aviation Training Center. On 12 December 2002, the 20th Squadrons Group "Andromeda" moved from Pontecagnano Airport to Lamezia Terme Airport.

On 3 November 2003, the Air Cavalry left the Italian Army's Cavalry Arm and became, as Army Aviation Specialty, a separate speciality of the Italian Army. Consequently, the 2nd Air Cavalry Regiment "Sirio" was renamed 2nd Army Aviation Regiment "Sirio", while the Air Cavalry Grouping was renamed Army Aviation Grouping. On 1 March 2006, the Army Aviation Grouping was reorganized and renamed Army Aviation Brigade.

On 24 June 2013, the 21st Squadrons Group "Orsa Maggiore" returned from the Army Aviation Training Center to the regiment. During the same year, the 20th Squadrons Group "Andromeda" was disbanded and its personnel and materiel integrated into the 30th Squadrons Group "Pegaso". On 1 October 2023, the regiment was assigned, together with all other army aviation regiments, to the Airmobile Brigade "Friuli".

== Organization ==
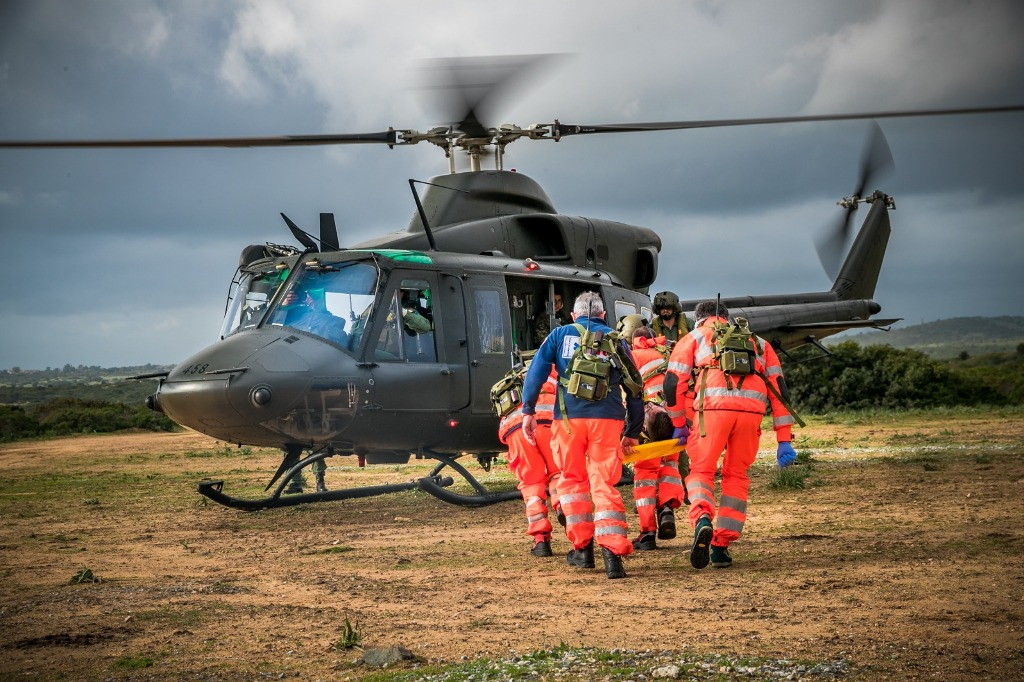
21st Squadrons Group "Orsa Maggiore" AB 412 helicopter in Sardinia

As of 2026 the 2nd Army Aviation Regiment "Sirio" is organized as follows:

- 2nd Army Aviation Regiment "Sirio", at Lamezia Terme Airport
  - Command and Logistic Support Squadron, at Lamezia Terme Airport
  - 21st Army Aviation Detachment "Orsa Maggiore", at Elmas Airport
    - Command and Logistic Support Squadron
    - Light Utility Helicopters Squadron
  - 30th Squadrons Group "Pegaso", at Lamezia Terme Airport
    - 430th Combat Support Helicopters Squadron
    - 530th Combat Support Helicopters Squadron
  - Maintenance Squadron, at Lamezia Terme Airport
  - Training Unit, at Lamezia Terme Airport

== Equipment ==
The 21st Army Aviation Detachment "Orsa Maggiore" is equipped with AB 412 helicopters, while the 30th Squadrons Group "Pegaso" is equipped with AB 412 and UH-169D helicopters.

== See also ==
- Army Aviation
