= 4th Army Aviation Support Squadrons Group "Scorpione" =

Active Italian Army helicopter maintenance unit

- 4° Gruppo Squadroni Sostegno Aviazione dell'Esercito "Scorpione"
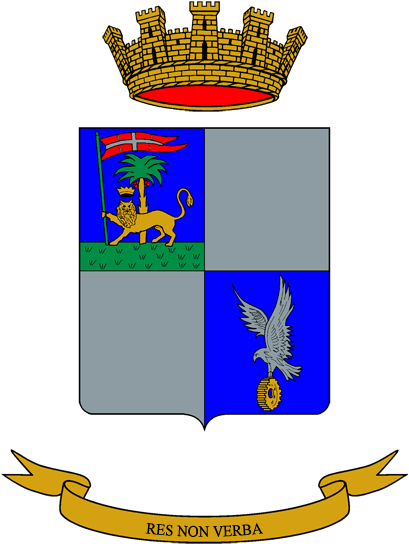
- Squadrons group coat of arms
- Active: 12 Dec. 1989 — today
- Country: Italy
- Branch: Italian Army
- Type: Military logistics
- Part of: Army Aviation Support Brigade
- Garrison/HQ: Viterbo Airport
- Motto(s): "Res non verba"
- Anniversaries: 10 May 1953 - Founding of the Italian Army Aviation

Insignia
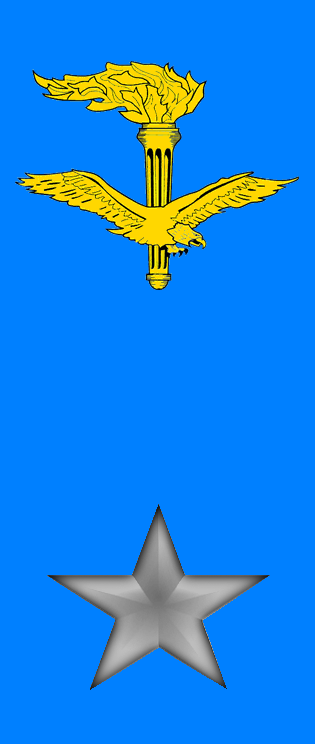
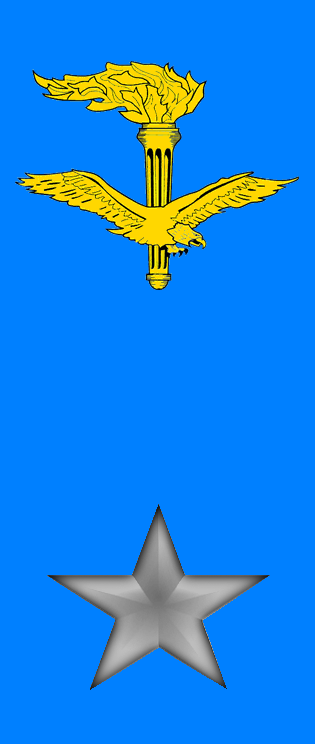
- Army Aviation gorget patches

The 4th Army Aviation Support Squadrons Group "Scorpione" (Italian: 4° Gruppo Squadroni Sostegno Aviazione dell'Esercito "Scorpione") is an Italian Army unit based at Viterbo Airport near Rome in Lazio. The squadrons group is part of the Italian Army's army aviation and assigned to the Army Aviation Support Brigade. The squadrons group provides 2nd-line maintenance, upgrade and test services for the CH-47F Chinook helicopters, Shadow 200 drones, and P180 Avanti II and Dornier 228 planes of the 1st Army Aviation Regiment "Antares", and to the army's flight simulators.

== History ==
On 15 June 1976, the 4th Army Light Aviation Repairs Unit was formed at the Viterbo Airport in Viterbo by expanding the existing Technical-Logistical CH-47C Team. The team had been formed by the 1st Army Light Aviation Repairs Unit to support the arrival of the first CH-47C Chinook helicopters. At the time the unit consisted of a command, a command squadron, a supply section, an inspection and recovery section, an aircraft maintenance and repair section, a helicopter maintenance and repair section, and a subsystems repair section. The unit provided technical-logistical services for CH-47C Chinook helicopters of the 1st Army Light Aviation Grouping "Antares".

On 12 December 1989, the President of the Italian Republic Francesco Cossiga granted the unit a flag. In 1990, the unit consisted of a command, an administration office, an aviation materiel office, a general services department, a technical department, and aircraft squadron. On 2 June 1993, the unit was renamed 4th Army Aviation Repairs Unit. On 1 September 1996, the unit was renamed 4th Army Aviation Support Regiment "Scorpione".

On 1 June 1999, the Army Aviation was assigned to the Italian Army's Cavalry Arm as a speciality of the arm. Consequently, the 4th Army Aviation Support Regiment "Scorpione" was renamed 4th Air Cavalry Support Regiment "Scorpione". On 3 November 2003, the Air Cavalry left the Italian Army's Cavalry Arm and became, as Army Aviation Specialty, a separate speciality of the Italian Army. Consequently, the 4th Air Cavalry Support Regiment "Scorpione" was renamed 4th Army Aviation Support Regiment "Scorpione". In 2012, the regiment was assigned to the Army Aviation Support Command, which, on 31 July 2019, was renamed Army Aviation Support Brigade. On the same date, the regiment was reduced to 4th Army Aviation Support Squadrons Group "Scorpione".

== Naming ==
Since the 1975 army reform Italian Army aviation units are named for celestial objects: aviation support regiments are numbered with a single digit and named for one of the 88 modern constellations. As in 1996 the 4th Army Aviation Repairs Unit was supporting the 1st Army Aviation Regiment "Antares", which was named for Antares, the brightest star in the Scorpius (Italian: Scorpione) constellation, the army decided to name the 4th Army Aviation Support Regiment "Scorpione" to affirm the two regiments' relationship. As the squadrons group was founded in the city of Viterbo the squadrons group's coats of arms first quarter depicts Viterbo's coat of arms.

== Organization ==
As of 2024 the 4th Army Aviation Support Squadrons Group "Scorpione" is organized as follows:

- 4th Army Aviation Support Squadrons Group "Scorpione", at Viterbo Airport
  - Command and Logistic Support Squadron
  - Maintenance Unit
  - Flight Squadron (AB 206 helicopters)

== See also ==
- Army Aviation
