= 1st Army Aviation Regiment "Antares" =

Active Italian Army helicopter unit

- 1° Reggimento Aviazione dell'Esercito "Antares"
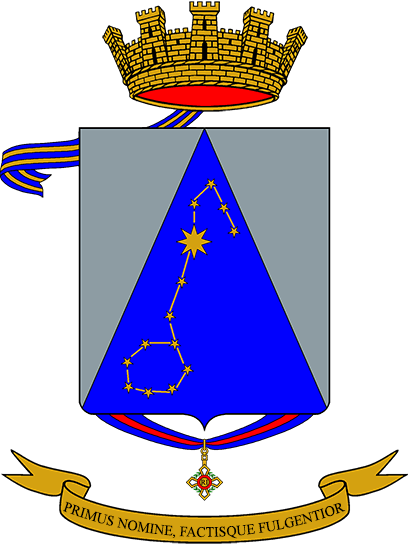
- Regimental coat of arms highlighting Antares within the constellation Scorpius
- Active: 1 Feb. 1976 — today
- Country: Italy
- Branch: Italian Army
- Type: Army Aviation
- Part of: Airmobile Brigade "Friuli"
- Garrison/HQ: Viterbo Airport
- Mottos: "Primus nomine, factisque fulgentior"
- Anniversaries: 10 May 1953 - Founding of the Italian Army Aviation
- Decorations: 2× Military Order of Italy; 1× Silver Medal of Army Valor; 1× Silver Cross of Army Merit

Insignia
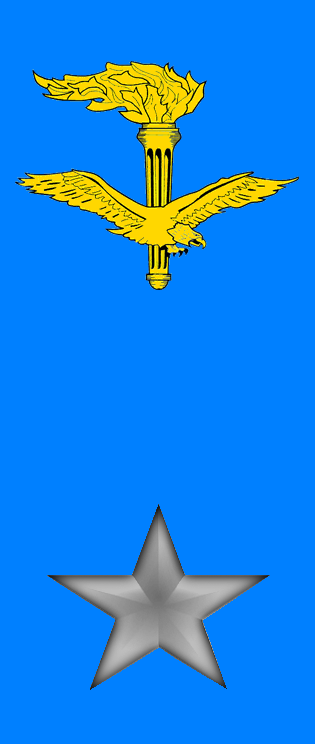
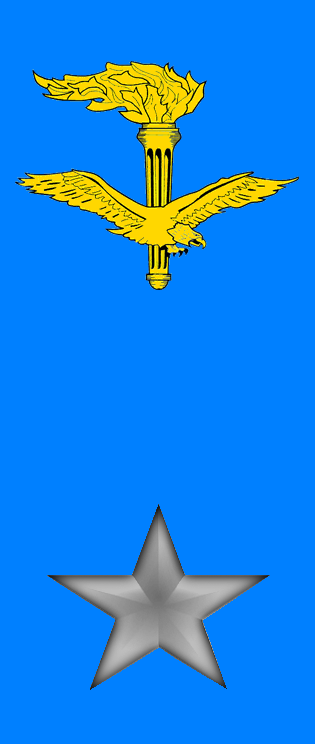
- Army Aviation gorget patches

The 1st Army Aviation Regiment "Antares" (Italian: 1° Reggimento Aviazione dell'Esercito "Antares") is an Italian Army regiment based at Viterbo Airport in Lazio. The regiment is part of the Italian army aviation and assigned to the Airmobile Brigade "Friuli". Formed in 1976 as heavy lift aviation unit the regiment has been equipped since its formation with CH-47 Chinook helicopters. The regiment's anniversary falls, as for all Italian Army aviation units, on 10 May 1953, the day the aviation speciality was founded.

== History ==
On 1 August 1965, the I General Use Helicopters Unit was formed at Viterbo Airport. On 1 September 1972, the Medium Helicopters Unit was formed at the same airport. Both units were assigned to the Office of the Inspector of Army Light Aviation.

=== Formation ===
During the 1975 Army reform the army reorganized its aviation units and for the first time created aviation units above battalion level. On 1 February 1976, the 1st Army Light Aviation Grouping "Antares" was formed at Viterbo Airport and took command of the I General Use Helicopters Unit and the Medium Helicopters Unit. Both units were reorganized and the grouping consisted after its formation of the following units:

- 1st Army Light Aviation Grouping "Antares", at Viterbo Airport
  - 11th Medium Transport Helicopters Squadrons Group "Ercole" (former Medium Helicopters Unit)
    - Command and Services Squadron
    - 111th Medium Transport Helicopters Squadron (CH-47C Chinook helicopters)
    - 112th Medium Transport Helicopters Squadron (CH-47C Chinook helicopters)
  - 12th Medium Transport Helicopters Squadrons Group "Gru" (formed 12 October 1977)
    - Command and Services Squadron
    - 121st Medium Transport Helicopters Squadron (CH-47C Chinook helicopters)
    - 122nd Medium Transport Helicopters Squadron (CH-47C Chinook helicopters)
  - 51st Multirole Helicopters Squadrons Group "Leone" (former I General Use Helicopters Unit)
    - Command and Services Squadron
    - 511th Multirole Helicopters Squadron (AB 204B & AB 205 helicopters)
    - 512th Multirole Helicopters Squadron (AB 204B & AB 205 helicopters)
    - 513th Multirole Helicopters Squadron (AB 204B & AB 205 helicopters)
    - 514th Multirole Helicopters Squadron (AB 204B & AB 205 helicopters)
  - Aircraft Efficiency Group

In total the grouping fielded 24 CH-47C Chinook helicopters and 24 AB 204B & AB 205 helicopters.

=== Naming ===
Since the 1975 Army reform Italian army aviation units are named for celestial objects: regiments are numbered with a single digit and named for stars in the 88 modern constellationss. Accordingly, an army aviation regiment's coat of arms highlights the name-giving star within its constellation. Squadron groups were numbered with two digits and named for constellations, or planets of the Solar System. The 1st Army Light Aviation Grouping was named for Antares, which is the brightest star in the constellation Scorpius (Italian: Scorpione). In 1996, the Italian Army formed army aviation support regiments, which were named to reflect the aviation regiment they supported. Consequently, the army aviation support regiment supporting the 1st Army Aviation Regiment "Antares" was named 4th Army Aviation Support Regiment "Scorpione".

On 14 March 1977, the President of the Italian Republic Giovanni Leone granted with decree 173 the grouping a flag. Since then one Military Order of Italy for the regiment's service with the United Nations Transition Assistance Group in Namibia and the United Nations Interim Force in Lebanon, one Military Order of Italy for the regiment's international operations between 1991 and 2016, one Silver Medal of Army Valor for the regiment's service after the 1980 Irpinia earthquake, and one Silver Cross of Army Merit for the regiment's service with the United Nations Operation in Somalia I and the United Nations Operation in Somalia II, have been awarded to the regiment. The awards were affixed to the regiment's flag.

=== Recent times ===
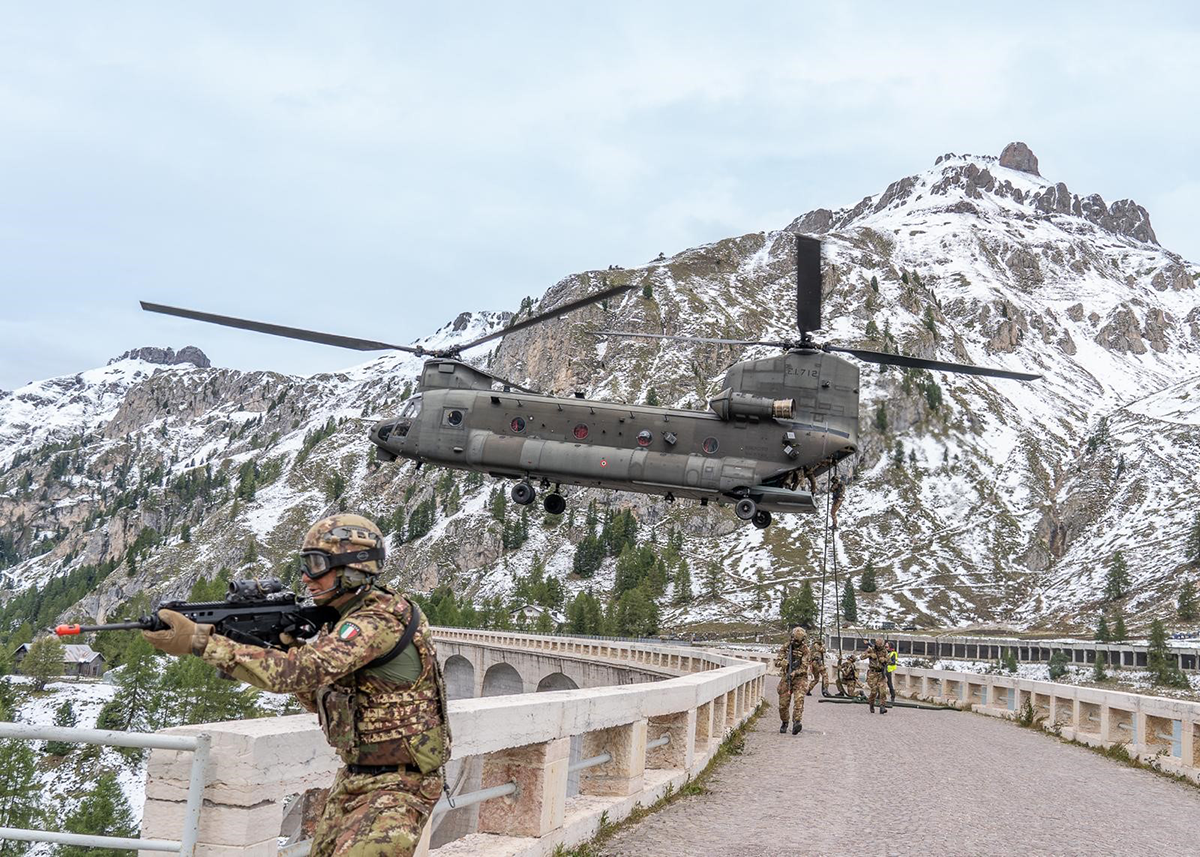
1st Army Aviation Regiment "Antares" CH-47F Chinook helicopter in the Dolomites

On 25 June 1979, the grouping formed the ITALAIR Squadron in Naqoura in Lebanon for the United Nations Interim Force in Lebanon. On 1 September 1981, the 12th Medium Transport Helicopters Squadrons Group "Gru" was disbanded and its personnel and materiel integrated into the 11th Medium Transport Helicopters Squadrons Group "Ercole". In 1989, the last AB 204B helicopters were retired. On 5 October 1991, the 1st Army Light Aviation Grouping "Antares" was renamed 1st Army Light Aviation Regiment "Antares", and two years later, on 12 June 1993, 1st Army Aviation Regiment "Antares". On 29 November 1993, the regiment formed the Liaison and Light Transport Planes Squadron (ACTL Squadron), which received Dornier 228-212 planes.

On 1 June 1999, the Army Aviation was assigned to the Italian Army's Cavalry Arm as a speciality of the arm. Consequently, the 1st Army Aviation Regiment "Antares" was renamed 1st Air Cavalry Regiment "Antares". On 1 October 1999, the ACTL Squadron was transferred from the 1st Air Cavalry Regiment "Antares" to the Army Aviation Center's 28th Squadrons Group "Tucano". On the same date the "Tucano" squadrons group moved from Rome Urbe Airport to Viterbo Airport and integrated the Army Aviation Center's Liaison and Regional Transport Planes Squadron (ACTR Squadron), which was equipped with P180E Avanti II planes. On the same date the ITALAIR Squadron in Lebanon was transferred from the 1st Air Cavalry Regiment "Antares" to the Army Aviation Command. During the same year the 39th Squadrons Group "Drago", which was based at Alghero–Fertilia Airport in Sardinia, was disbanded and its personnel and materiel transferred to Viterbo Airport, where they were used to form the Medium Helicopters Squadron. The new squadron was equipped with AB-412A helicopters and assigned to the 1st Air Cavalry Regiment "Antares". Afterwards the 1st Air Cavalry Regiment "Antares" consisted of the following units:

- 1st Air Cavalry Regiment "Antares", at Viterbo Airport
  - 11th Squadrons Group "Ercole"
    - Command and Services Squadron
    - 111th Medium Transport Helicopters Squadron (CH-47C Chinook helicopters)
    - 112th Medium Transport Helicopters Squadron (CH-47C Chinook helicopters)
  - 51st Multirole Helicopters Squadrons Group "Leone"
    - Command and Services Squadron
    - 511th Medium Transport Helicopters Squadron (CH-47C Chinook helicopters)
    - 512th Medium Transport Helicopters Squadron (CH-47C Chinook helicopters)
  - Support Squadrons Group
    - Logistic Support Squadron
    - Maintenance Squadron
  - Medium Helicopters Squadron (AB-412A helicopters; former 39th Squadrons Group "Drago")

On 1 September 2001, the 26th Squadrons Group "Giove" based at Pisa Air Base was transferred from the Paratroopers Brigade "Folgore" to the 1st Air Cavalry Regiment "Antares". During the same year, the regiment entered the newly formed Air Cavalry Grouping. On 4 November 2002, the 26th Squadrons Group "Giove", 51st Squadrons Group "Leone", and Medium Helicopters Squadron merged to form the 26th Air Cavalry Squadrons Group "Giove" - Special Operations Helicopters Unit (Italian: Reparto Elicotteri per Operazioni Speciali - REOS). The "Giove" squadrons group maintained a detachment at Pisa-San Giusto Air Base, which was equipped with AB 205 helicopters.

On 3 November 2003, the Air Cavalry left the Italian Army's Cavalry Arm and became, as Army Aviation Specialty, a separate speciality of the Italian Army. Consequently, the 1st Air Cavalry Regiment "Antares" was renamed 1st Army Aviation Regiment "Antares", while the Air Cavalry Grouping was renamed Army Aviation Grouping. On 1 March 2006, the Army Aviation Grouping was reorganized and renamed Army Aviation Brigade.

On 24 June 2013, the 28th Squadrons Group "Tucano" joined the regiment. On 10 November 2014, the 26th Squadrons Group "Giove" left the regiment and was then used to form the 3rd Special Operations Helicopter Regiment "Aldebaran". On 1 October 2023, the regiment was assigned, together with all other army aviation regiments, to the Airmobile Brigade "Friuli".

== Organization ==
As of 2024 the 1st Army Aviation Regiment "Antares" is organized as follows:

- 1st Army Aviation Regiment "Antares", at Viterbo Airport
  - Headquarters Unit
  - 11th Squadrons Group "Ercole"
    - 111th Medium Transport Helicopters Squadron
    - 112th Medium Transport Helicopters Squadron
  - 28th Squadrons Group "Tucano", at Viterbo Airport (Lazio)
    - Regional Transport and Liaison Planes Squadron (P180 Avanti II planes)
    - Light Transport and Liaison Planes Squadron (Dornier 228-212 planes)
  - Support Squadrons Group
    - Logistic Support Squadron
    - Maintenance Squadron

== Equipment ==
The 11th Squadrons Group "Ercole" is equipped with CH-47F Chinook transport helicopters.

== See also ==
- Army Aviation
