= Belluno Airport =

Belluno Airport Aeroporto di Belluno
- IATA: BLX; ICAO: LIDB

Summary
- Airport type: Aero Club
- Serves: Belluno, Italy
- Location: Belluno
- Elevation AMSL: 1,240 ft / 378 m
- Coordinates: 46°10′00″N 12°14′53″E
- Interactive map of Belluno Airport

Runways
Direction	Length		Surface
Direction	m	ft	Surface
05/23	812	2,664	Grass

Belluno Airport is an airport located in Belluno, Italy. The airport is also known as Arturo Dell'Oro Airport.

== Accidents and incidents ==
- On March 11, 1967 a de Havilland Canada DHC-6 Twin Otter operated by Aeralpi crashed into a hill while flying from Venice Marco Polo Airport while on approach to Belluno Airport in bad weather.
