= Rome Viterbo Airport =

Rome Viterbo Airport Tommaso Fabbri
- IATA: (VTR Proposed); ICAO: LIRV

Summary
- Airport type: Joint (Civil and Military)
- Serves: Rome
- Location: Viterbo
- Elevation AMSL: 992 ft (302 m)
- Coordinates: 42°26′10″N 12°3′42″E
- Website: Airport Committee
- Interactive map of Rome Viterbo Airport

Runways
Direction	Length		Surface
Direction	ft	m	Surface
22C/04C	4,265	1,300	Asphalt
22R/04L	3,297	1,004	Asphalt
22L/04R	1,936	590	Asphalt

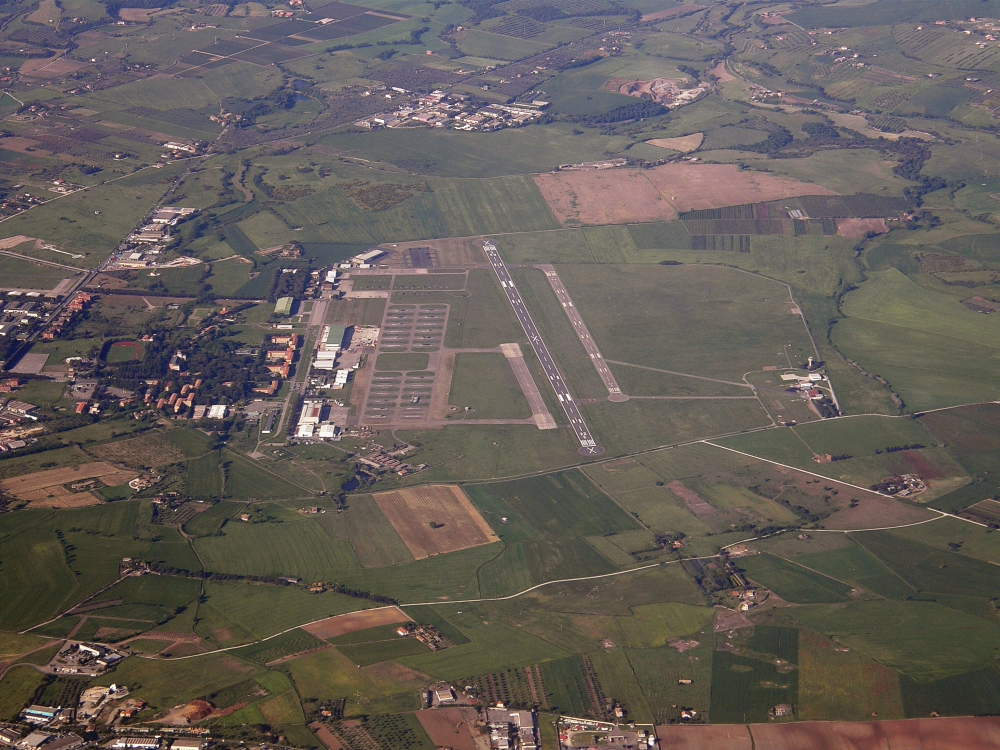
Viterbo airport

Rome Viterbo Airport (Italian: Aeroporto di Roma-Viterbo (ICAO: LIRV) is a proposed re-use of Viterbo Air Force Base, a civilian, commercial and military airport about 80 kilometres (50 mi) north of Rome, Italy.

Originally opened as a military airport in 1936, the airfield was dedicated to Tommaso Fabbri and is situated 3 km (1.9 mi) northwest of the town of Viterbo in the Lazio region.

On November 26, 2007, Italian transport minister Alessandro Bianchi announced that Viterbo had been chosen by the Italian Ministry of Transport as the site of the next Airport to serve Rome, alongside Leonardo da Vinci Airport, and Rome Ciampino Airport. It was chosen over alternative sites in Latina, Frosinone, and Guidonia. However, these plans have since been abandoned.

== Planning process ==
In October, 2008, proposed operator, Aeroporti di Roma (ADR), signed a concession agreement with Italy's civil aviation authority, Ente Nazionale per l'Aviazione Civile (ENAC), under which ADR will prepare

- a technical-operational feasibility study for Viterbo Airport, examining aviation and traffic issues as well as the situation of the major airport sub-systems and defining the size of the airport area;
- a preliminary environmental report on any significant impact of Viterbo airport works, to start the consultation provided for under Law Decree n. 152 dated 3 April 2006 and subsequent supplements and amendments;
- a study of Ciampino Airport environmental capacity, in order to develop an economically sustainable reduced traffic model, to be mandatorily adopted for the future, being capable to fulfil the territory environmental requirements;
- the airport Master Plan, envisaging the reduction of operations at Ciampino airport concurrently with the start of the new operations at Viterbo airport, accompanied by the relevant Environmental Impact Study. An adequate policy will also be requested for the commercial value increase of non-aviation activities both inside and outside the airport area, together with the definition of a transport infrastructure system suitable to support the traffic flow generated by the construction of the new airport;
- the economic-financial plan, to reliably support the works implementation programme, together with cost estimate and financial coverage, identifying own financial resources and any external financing means;
- Ciampino Airport infrastructure adaptation plan, by re-planning the activities as required to ensure time consistency with the opening and operation of Viterbo airport

== Ground transportation ==
In October, 2008, the government of the Lazio region presented a plan to improve the Viterbo to Rome rail connections to offer a 70-minute travel time, and operate a train every 15 minutes. The government stated that the service will be operated with new 10 trainsets.

== Navigational aids and codes ==
It is currently the site of a non-directional beacon designated VIB, but its IATA Airport Code has not yet been determined, though VTB has been proposed.
