= 1st Army Aviation Support Regiment "Idra" =

Active Italian Army helicopter maintenance unit

- 1° Reggimento Sostegno Aviazione dell'Esercito "Idra"
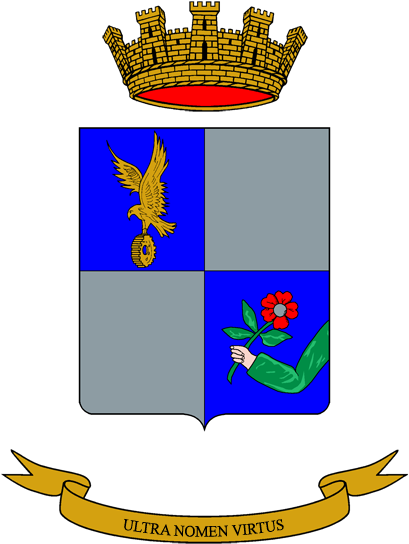
- Regimental coat of arms
- Active: 12 Dec. 1989 — today
- Country: Italy
- Branch: Italian Army
- Type: Military logistics
- Part of: Army Aviation Support Brigade
- Garrison/HQ: Airfield "Oscar Savini"
- Motto(s): "Ultra nomen virtus"
- Anniversaries: 10 May 1953 - Founding of the Italian Army Aviation

Insignia
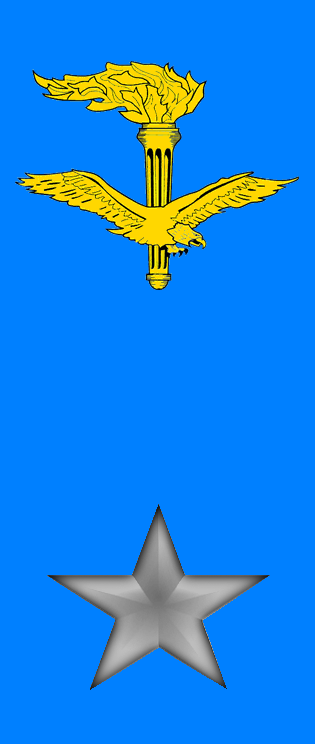
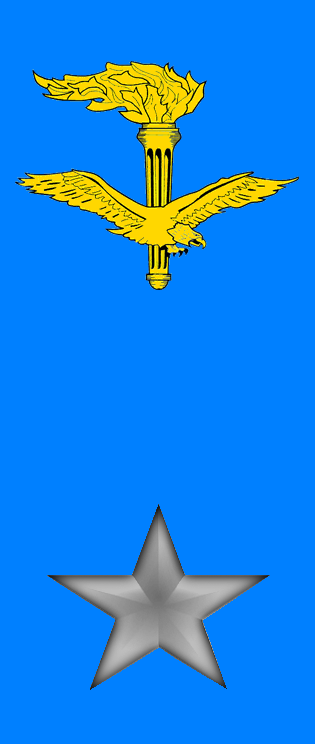
- Army Aviation gorget patches

The 1st Army Aviation Support Regiment "Idra" (Italian: 1° Reggimento Sostegno Aviazione dell'Esercito "Idra") is an Italian Army unit based at the "Oscar Savini" Airfield in Manziana in Lazio. The regiment is part of the Italian Army's army aviation and assigned to the Army Aviation Support Brigade. The regiment provides 2nd-line maintenance, upgrade and test services for the A109 and AB 206 helicopters, which are in service with the Army Aviation Training Center at Viterbo Airport, and for the AB 205A, AB 212, and AB 412 helicopters, which are in service with the 2nd Army Aviation Regiment "Sirio", 4th Army Aviation Regiment "Altair", and 3rd Special Operations Helicopter Regiment "Aldebaran".

== History ==
In 1953, the Army Light Aircraft Repairs Unit was formed at the Artillery Aerial Observation Training Center in Bracciano. In 1957, the center was renamed Army Light Aviation Training Center and moved from Bracciano to Viterbo. On 1 March 1957, the 2nd Army Light Aircraft Repairs Unit was formed in Bologna and consequently, on 1 July 1958, the Army Light Aircraft Repairs Unit was renamed 1st Army Light Aviation Repairs Unit. At the time the unit consisted of a command, a command squadron, a supply section, an inspection and recovery section, an aircraft maintenance and repair section, a helicopter maintenance and repair section, and a subsystems repair section. The unit provided technical-logistical services for all of the army's flying units in central and southern Italy, including the islands of Sicily and Sardinia. The unit also served as the central materiel depot for all of the army's aviation units.

On 12 December 1989, the President of the Italian Republic Francesco Cossiga granted the unit a flag. In 1990, the unit consisted of a command, an administration office, an aviation materiel office, a general services department, a technical department, and aircraft squadron. On 2 June 1993, the unit was renamed 1st Army Aviation Repairs Unit. On 1 September 1996, the unit was renamed 1st Army Aviation Support Regiment "Idra".

On 1 June 1999, the Army Aviation was assigned to the Italian Army's Cavalry Arm as a speciality of the arm. Consequently, the 1st Army Aviation Support Regiment "Idra" was renamed 1st Air Cavalry Support Regiment "Idra". On 3 November 2003, the Air Cavalry left the Italian Army's Cavalry Arm and became, as Army Aviation Specialty, a separate speciality of the Italian Army. Consequently, the 1st Air Cavalry Support Regiment "Idra" was renamed 1st Army Aviation Support Regiment "Idra". In 2012, the regiment was assigned to the Army Aviation Support Command, which, on 31 July 2019, was renamed Army Aviation Support Brigade.

== Naming ==
Since the 1975 army reform Italian Army aviation units are named for celestial objects: aviation support regiments are numbered with a single digit and named for one of the 88 modern constellations. The 1st Army Aviation Support Regiment was named for Hydra (Italian: Idra), the largest of the 88 modern constellations. As the regiment was founded in the city of Bracciano the regiment's coats of arms fourth quarter depicts Bracciano's coat of arms.

== Organization ==
As of 2024 the 1st Army Aviation Support Regiment "Idra" is organized as follows:

- 1st Army Aviation Support Regiment "Idra", at "Oscar Savini" Airfield
  - Command and Logistic Support Squadron
  - Maintenance Unit
  - Flight Squadron (AB 206 helicopters)
  - Quality Control Section

== See also ==
- Army Aviation
