= 7th Army Aviation Regiment =

7th Army Aviation Regiment may refer to:

- 7th Army Aviation Regiment (Italy)
- 7th Army Aviation Regiment (Ukraine)
