= 3rd Army Aviation Support Regiment "Aquila" =

Active Italian Army helicopter maintenance unit

- 3° Reggimento Sostegno Aviazione dell'Esercito "Aquila"
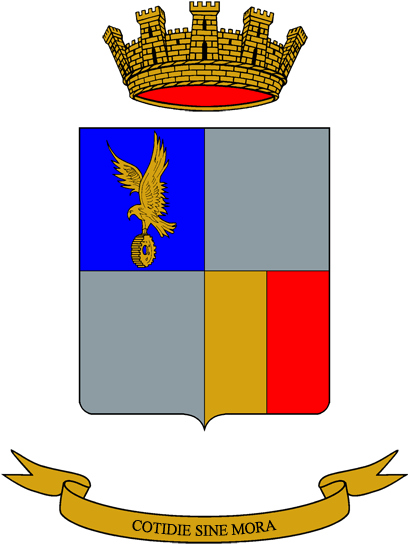
- Regimental coat of arms
- Active: 12 Dec. 1989 — today
- Country: Italy
- Branch: Italian Army
- Type: Military logistics
- Part of: Army Aviation Support Brigade
- Garrison/HQ: Orio al Serio Airport
- Motto: "Cotidie sine mora"
- Anniversaries: 10 May 1953 - Founding of the Italian Army Aviation

Insignia
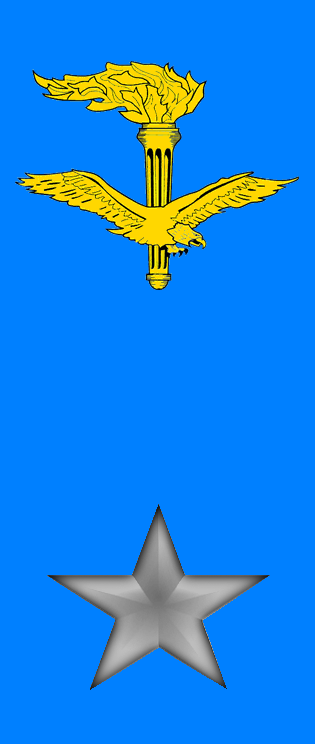
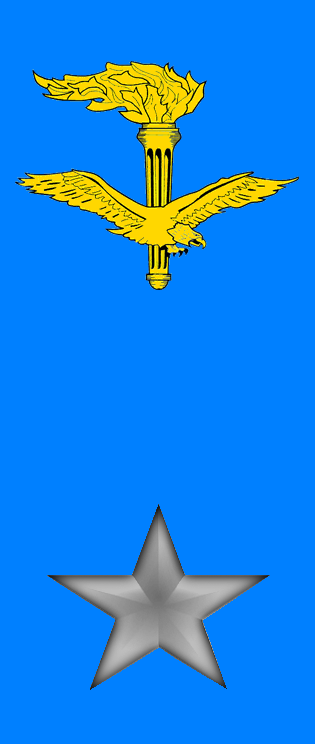
- Army Aviation gorget patches

The 3rd Army Aviation Support Regiment "Aquila" (Italian: 3° Reggimento Sostegno Aviazione dell'Esercito "Aquila") is an Italian Army unit based at Orio al Serio Airport near Bergamo in Lombardy. The regiment is part of the Italian Army's army aviation and assigned to the Army Aviation Support Brigade. The regiment provides 2nd-line maintenance, upgrade and test services for the A129D Mangusta attack helicopters of the 5th Army Aviation Regiment "Rigel" and 7th Army Aviation Regiment "Vega".

== History ==
On 1 September 1965, the 3rd Army Light Aviation Repairs Unit was formed at the Orio al Serio Airport in Bergamo. At the time the unit consisted of a command, a command squadron, a supply section, an inspection and recovery section, an aircraft maintenance and repair section, a helicopter maintenance and repair section, and a subsystems repair section. The unit provided technical-logistical services for flying units of the III Army Corps, IV Army Corps, and V Army Corps.

On 12 December 1989, the President of the Italian Republic Francesco Cossiga granted the unit a flag. In 1990, the unit consisted of a command, an administration office, an aviation materiel office, a general services department, a technical department, and aircraft squadron. On 2 June 1993, the unit was renamed 3rd Army Aviation Repairs Unit. On 1 September 1996, the unit was renamed 3rd Army Aviation Support Regiment "Aquila".

On 1 June 1999, the Army Aviation was assigned to the Italian Army's Cavalry Arm as a speciality of the arm. Consequently, the 3rd Army Aviation Support Regiment "Aquila" was renamed 3rd Air Cavalry Support Regiment "Aquila". On 3 November 2003, the Air Cavalry left the Italian Army's Cavalry Arm and became, as Army Aviation Specialty, a separate speciality of the Italian Army. Consequently, the 3rd Air Cavalry Support Regiment "Aquila" was renamed 3rd Army Aviation Support Regiment "Aquila". In 2012, the regiment was assigned to the Army Aviation Support Command, which, on 31 July 2019, was renamed Army Aviation Support Brigade.

== Naming ==
Since the 1975 army reform Italian Army aviation units are named for celestial objects: aviation support regiments are numbered with a single digit and named for one of the 88 modern constellations. As in 1996 the 3rd Army Aviation Repairs Unit was supporting the 4th Army Aviation Regiment "Altair", which was named for Altair, the brightest star in the constellation Aquila, the army decided to name the 3rd Army Aviation Support Regiment "Aquila" to affirm the two regiments' relationship. As the regiment was founded in the city of Bergamo the regiment's coats of arms fourth quarter depicts Bergamo's coat of arms.

== Organization ==
As of 2024 the 3rd Army Aviation Support Regiment "Aquila" is organized as follows:

- 3rd Army Aviation Support Regiment "Aquila", at Orio al Serio Airport
  - Command and Logistic Support Squadron
  - Maintenance Unit
  - Flight Squadron (AB 206 helicopters)
  - Quality Control Section

== See also ==
- Army Aviation
