= 11th Transport Regiment "Flaminia" =

Active Italian Army transport unit

- 11° Reggimento Trasporti "Flaminia"
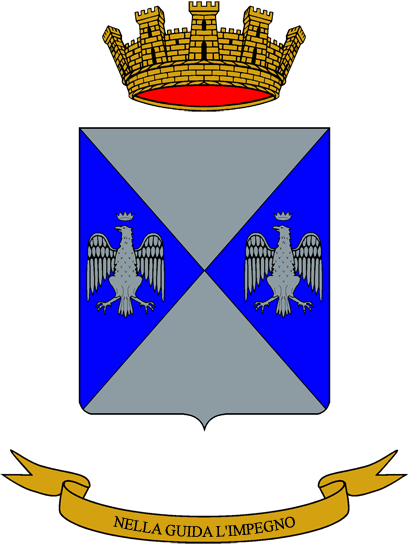
- Regimental coat of arms
- Active: 1 Oct. 1976 — today
- Country: Italy
- Branch: Italian Army
- Role: Military logistics
- Part of: Army General Staff
- Garrison/HQ: Rome
- Motto(s): "Nella guida l'impegno"
- Anniversaries: 22 May 1916 - Battle of Asiago
- Decorations: 1× Silver Cross of Army Merit

Insignia
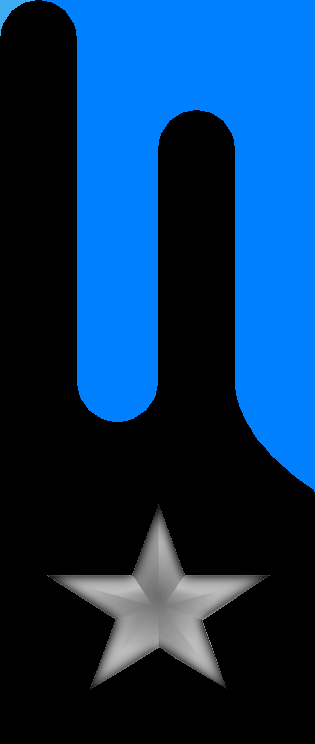
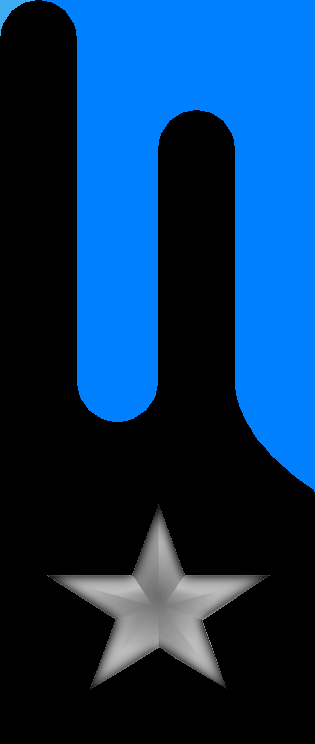
- Unit gorget patches

The 11th Transport Regiment "Flaminia" (Italian: 11° Reggimento Trasporti "Flaminia") is a military logistics regiment of the Italian Army based in Rome. The regiment is assigned to the Army General Staff and provides the necessary transport for the army's general staff to operate. Like all transport units of the Italian Army the regiment was named for a historic road near its base: in the 11th regiment's case for the Roman road Via Flaminia. The regiment's anniversary falls, as for all units of the Italian Army's Transport and Materiel Corps, on 22 May, the anniversary of the Royal Italian Army's first major use of automobiles to transport reinforcements to the Asiago plateau to counter the Austro-Hungarian Asiago Offensive in May 1916.

== History ==
On 1 January 1948, the Army General Staff Maneuver Auto Group was formed in Rome with personnel and materiel drawn from the units of the General Staff Auto Units Command; namely the 21st Special Auto Unit and the Motorcyclists Company. On 1 May 1958, the group was renamed XI Maneuver Auto Group and now consisted of the 1st Auto Unit, the 2nd Auto Unit, and the 12th Light Workshop.

On 1 August 1976, as part of the 1975 army reform, the XI Maneuver Auto Group was renamed 11th Maneuver Auto Group. On 1 October 1976, the group was renamed 11th Maneuver Auto Group "Flaminia". Like all Italian Army transport units the group was named for a historic road near its base: in the case of the 11th Maneuver Auto Group for the Roman road Via Flaminia, which connected Rome with Rimini. The group consisted of the 1st Heavy Auto Unit, the 2nd Medium Auto Unit, 3rd Car Auto Unit, 4th Mixed Auto Unit, and a reinforced Light Workshop. The group was assigned to the Army General Staff's Service Units Command.

On 12 November 1976, the President of the Italian Republic Giovanni Leone granted with decree 846 the group a flag.

On 18 June 1991, the group's 3rd Car Auto Unit became a detached unit and moved to Castro Pretorio to be closer to the Army General Staff in the center of Rome. On 1 July 1998, the group was renamed 11th Transport Battalion "Flaminia". On 31 March 2014, the battalion lost its autonomy and the next day the battalion entered the newly formed 11th Transport Regiment "Flaminia".

== Organization ==
As of 2024 the 11th Transport Regiment "Flaminia" is organized as follows:

- 11th Transport Regiment "Flaminia", in Rome
  - Command and Logistic Support Company
  - Transport Battalion
    - 1st Transport Company
    - 2nd Transport Company
    - 3rd Transport Company
    - Maintenance Company

== See also ==
- Military logistics
