= 8th Transport Regiment "Casilina" =

Active Italian Army transport unit

- 8° Reggimento Trasporti "Casilina"
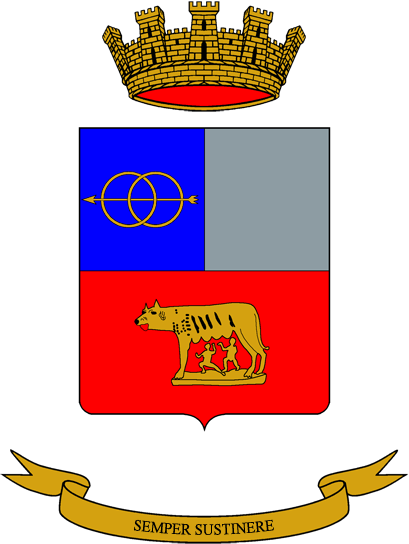
- Regimental coat of arms
- Active: 30 Oct. 1984 — today
- Country: Italy
- Branch: Italian Army
- Role: Military logistics
- Part of: Army Logistic Command
- Garrison/HQ: Rome
- Motto: "Semper sustinere"
- Anniversaries: 22 May 1916 - Battle of Asiago

Insignia
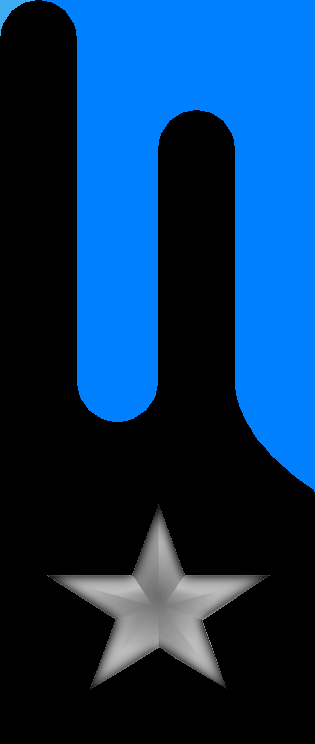
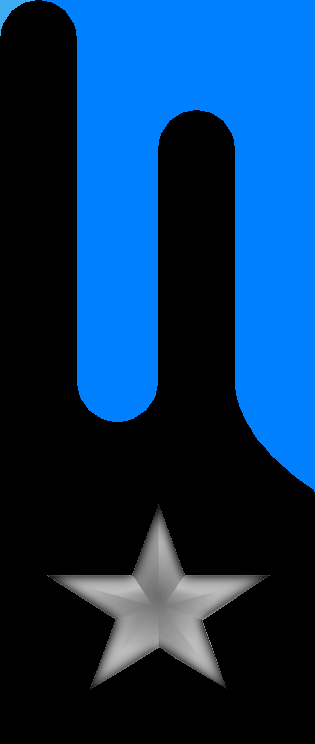
- Unit gorget patches

The 8th Transport Regiment "Casilina" (Italian: 8° Reggimento Trasporti "Casilina") is a military logistics regiment of the Italian Army based in Rome. The regiment is operationally assigned to the Army Logistic Command and is responsible for the transport of the army's material between operational units and the Army Logistic Command's maintenance centers. Like all transport units of the Italian Army the regiment was named for a historic road near its base: in the 8th Transport Regiment's case for the medieval Via Casilina. The regiment's anniversary falls, as for all units of the Italian Army's Transport and Materiel Corps, on 22 May, the anniversary of the Royal Italian Army's first major use of automobiles to transport reinforcements to the Asiago plateau to counter the Austro-Hungarian Asiago Offensive in May 1916.

== History ==
=== Interwar years ===
In August 1920, the VII Automobilistic Center was formed in Rome and assigned to the VII Army Corps. In 1923, the center was disbanded and its personnel and materiel used to form the VII Auto Grouping, which consisted of a command, an auto group, a railway group, and a depot. On 31 October 1926, the grouping was disbanded and the next day its personnel and vehicles were used to form the 8th Automobilistic Center. The center consisted of a command, the VIII Automobilistic Group, and a depot. The three companies of the disbanded railway group were assigned to the 1st Field Artillery Regiment, 7th Field Artillery Regiment, and 13th Field Artillery Regiment, while the railway section based in Sardinia was assigned to the 16th Field Artillery Regiment. The auto section based in Sardinia, was reorganized as 23rd Automobilistic Company and assigned to the 12th Automobilistic Center in Cagliari.

In 1935-36, the center mobilized an advanced workshop group, six auto units, and an automobilistic vehicles park workshop for the Second Italo-Ethiopian War. The center also provided 81 officers, 100 non-commissioned officers, and 2,045 soldiers to units, which deployed to East Africa for the war.

=== World War II ===
On 1 July 1942, the 8th Automobilistic Center was renamed 8th Drivers Regiment. In the evening of 8 September 1943, the Armistice of Cassibile, which ended hostilities between the Kingdom of Italy and the Anglo-American Allies, was announced by General Dwight D. Eisenhower on Radio Algiers and by Marshal Pietro Badoglio on Italian radio. Germany reacted by invading Italy and the 8th Drivers Regiment was disbanded soon thereafter by German forces. During World War II the center mobilized in its depots in Rome and Terni among others the following units:

- 4th Army Auto Grouping Command
- 7th Army Auto Grouping Command (deployed with the 8th Army to the Eastern Front)
- 10th Army Auto Grouping Command (deployed with the 8th Army to the Eastern Front)
- 11th Heavy Auto Group
- 18th Heavy Auto Group
- 43rd Mixed Auto Group
- 53rd Autobus Auto Group
- 123rd Heavy Auto Group
- 10th Roadside Assistance Unit
- 12th Roadside Assistance Unit
- 52nd Auto Workshop
- 128th Auto Workshop
- 58th Heavy Mobile Workshop

=== Cold War ===
On 17 February 1947, the 8th Drivers Center was formed in Rome. The center consisted of a command, the 8th Auto Unit, the 8th Vehicles Park, a fuel depot, and a depot. The center supported the VIII Territorial Military Command of the Central Military Region and was tasked with the transport of fuel, ammunition, and materiel between the military region's depots and the logistic supply points of the army's divisions and brigades. On 1 March 1949, the 8th Vehicles Park was transferred to the 8th Automotive Repair Shop. On 31 December 1964, the 8th Drivers Center was disbanded. The next day the 8th Auto Unit became an autonomous unit and was assigned to the VIII Territorial Military Command.

As part of the 1975 army reform the unit was renamed 8th Mixed Maneuver Auto Unit.

On 30 October 1984, the 8th Mixed Maneuver Auto Unit was reorganized as 8th Transport Battalion "Casilina". Like all Italian Army transport units the battalion was named for a historic road near its base, in case of the 8th Transport Battalion for the medieval Via Casilina, which connected Rome and Casilinum. On 13 July 1987, the President of the Italian Republic Francesco Cossiga granted the battalion a flag and assigned the battalion the traditions of the 8th Drivers Regiment. At the time the battalion consisted of a command, a command and services company, a mixed transport company, and a special transport company.

=== Recent times ===
On 30 June 1998, the 8th Transport Battalion "Casilina" lost its autonomy and the next day the battalion entered the newly formed 8th Transport Regiment "Casilina".

== Organization ==
As of 2024 the 8th Transport Regiment "Casilina" is organized as follows:

- 8th Transport Regiment "Casilina", in Rome
  - Command and Logistic Support Company
  - Transport Battalion
    - Mixed Transport Company
    - Heavy Transport Company
    - Maintenance Company

== See also ==
- Military logistics
