= Structure of the Italian Army =

The article provides an overview of the entire chain of command and organization of the Italian Army since the brigade reallocations of 1 July 2026 and includes all active units as of the same date. The Armed Forces of Italy are under the command of the Italian Supreme Defense Council, presided over by the President of the Italian Republic. The Italian Army is commanded by the Chief of the Army General Staff or "Capo di Stato Maggiore dell’Esercito" in Rome.

== Chief of the Army General Staff ==
The Chief of the Army General Staff in Rome, a four star general, commands the entire Italian Army. However the Army General Staff itself is commanded by the Deputy Chief of the Army General Staff.

=== Army General Staff ===
The Army General Staff in Rome is tasked with the study, research, development and general policy of the army. It is headed by the Deputy Chief of the Army General Staff.

- Chief of the Army General Staff, in Rome (Lazio)
  - Army Chief of Staff General Office
    - Public Information and Communication Office
  - Army Personnel Employment Department
  - Non-commissioned Officers Promotion Evaluation Commission
  - Sergeants Promotion Evaluation Commission
  - Troops Promotion Evaluation Commission
  - Deputy Chief of the Army General Staff
    - Deputy Chief Office
    - Military Psychology and Psychiatry Office
    - Document Flow and IT Protocol Office
    - Intendancy Directorate
      - Secretariat
      - Administrative Office
    - Surveillance Service, Prevention, and Protection Central Coordination Direction
      - Secretariat
      - Occupational Safety and Occupational Medicine Office
      - Area Surveillance Central Coordination Office
      - Environmental Protection and Cultural Heritage Office
  - 1st Personnel Legal and Economic Affairs Department
    - Secretariat
    - Department Deputy Commander
      - Recruitment, Status and Promotion Office
      - Juridical - Legal Office
      - Representation, Professional Military Unions/Associations, and Financial Treatment Office
  - 3rd General Planning Department
    - Secretariat
    - Planning Office
    - Forces Organization Office
    - Doctrine and Lessons Learned Office
    - International Activities Office
  - 4th Logistic Department
    - Secretariat
    - Logistic Coordination Office
    - Mobility Systems Office
    - Weapons, Ammunition, NBC, and Sensors Office
    - Transformation Office
    - 3rd Dimension Vehicles and Materiels Office
  - 5th General Affairs Department
    - Secretariat
    - General Affairs Office
    - Sport Office
      - Army Olympic Sport Center, in Rome (Lazio)
      - Military Equestrian Center, in Montelibretti (Lazio)
    - Financial Coordination Section
  - 6th C5I Department
    - Secretariat
    - C5I Resources Planning and Coordination Office
    - C5I Systems Office
    - C2 Support Systems Office
    - Systems Integration Office
    - Army C5 Command
      - C5 Systems Development and Integration Unit, in Padua (Veneto)
      - Systems Recovery Unit, in Florence (Tuscany)
  - Infrastructure Department
    - Secretariat
    - Works Office
    - Infrastructure Policy Office
    - Studies and Norms Office
    - Resources Management Section
    - Coordination and Financial Management Section
  - Marketing, Publishing and History Office
    - Marketing Office
    - History Office
    - Army Publishing Center
  - General Financial Planning Office
    - Secretariat
    - Financial Planning, Budget and Statistics Office
    - Internal Management Control Office
  - General Security Office (Counterintelligence)
  - Army Unified Salary Center
  - General Office of Italian Army Administrative Responsibility Center
    - General Office Activities Coordination Office
    - Budget Office
    - Central Administrative Office
    - Corruption Prevention, Litigation, and Legal Advice Office
  - Military Geographical Institute, in Florence (Tuscany)
  - Spiritual Assistance Service

==== Army Evaluation and Innovation Command ====
- Army Evaluation and Innovation Command, in Civitavecchia (Lazio)
  - 1st Armored Regiment, in Capo Teulada (Sardinia) manages the Capo Teulada Training Range for armored and heavy/medium units and provides the opposing force for exercises
  - 80th Regiment "Roma", in Monte Romano (Lazio) manages the Monte Romano Training Range for light and medium units and provides the opposing force for exercises
  - Cesano Training Range, in Rome (Lazio) for light infantry units, and the personnel of the Infantry School
  - Torre Veneri Training Range, in Lecce (Apulia) for armored and heavy units, and the personnel of the Cavalry School
  - San Giorgio Training Range, in Bruneck (South Tyrol) for light infantry units

=== Operational Land Forces Command ===
The Operational Land Forces Command (Italian: Comando delle Forze Operative Terrestri, abbreviation: COMFOTER) is the continuously operational command of the army. The command is headquartered in Rome. In case of war, outside of NATO's command structure, it would command the army's units.

On 1 July 2023 the Capital Military Command (Italian: Comando Militare della Capitale) in Rome was merged into COMFOTER, which thus became responsible for managing army events in Rome and its metro area, and for overseeing the administrative Army Military Commands tasked with public duties in, recruitment, administration of the reserves, public information, and promotional activities in the Lazio, Tuscany, and Sardinia regions. Additionally COMFOTER became responsible for the army's Monte Romano training range, the army museums in Rome, the military penitentiary organization, the army band, as well as the Italian military's Geographic Institute in Florence. The Army Military Command "Lazio" covering the Lazio region became an integral part of COMFOTER, while the Army Military Command "Toscana" covering the Tuscany region remained an integral part of the Military Geographical Institute.

- Operational Land Forces Command, in Rome
  - Commander's Secretariat
  - Planning, Programming and Budget Section
  - COMFOTER General Staff
    - Operations General Staff
    - Preparations General Staff

==== NATO Rapid Deployable Corps - Italy ====
The NATO Rapid Deployable Corps – Italy (NRDC-ITA) is a multinational, NATO-assigned deployable corps command headquartered in Solbiate Olona. The corps is commanded by a three-star general (OF-8).

- NATO Rapid Deployable Corps – Italy, in Solbiate Olona (Lombardy)

===== NRDC-ITA Support Brigade =====
- NRDC-ITA Support Brigade, in Solbiate Olona (Lombardy)
  - 1st Signal Regiment, in Milan (Lombardy)
    - Battalion "Spluga"
    - Battalion "Sempione"
  - 33rd Logistic and Tactical Support Regiment "Ambrosiano", in Solbiate Olona (Lombardy)

==== Combat Support Forces Command ====
The Combat Support Forces Command (Italian: Comando delle Forze di Supporto al Combattimento, abbreviation: COMFORSUP COMBAT) in Rome commands the army's operational support units. The command is commanded by a three-star general (OF-8).

- Combat Support Forces Command, in Rome (Lazio)
  - Cecchignola Base Command, in Rome-Cecchignola (Lazio)
    - Support Regiment "Cecchignola", in Rome-Cecchignola (Lazio) (supporting the commands, schools and units based at the Cecchignola military base)

===== Artillery Command =====
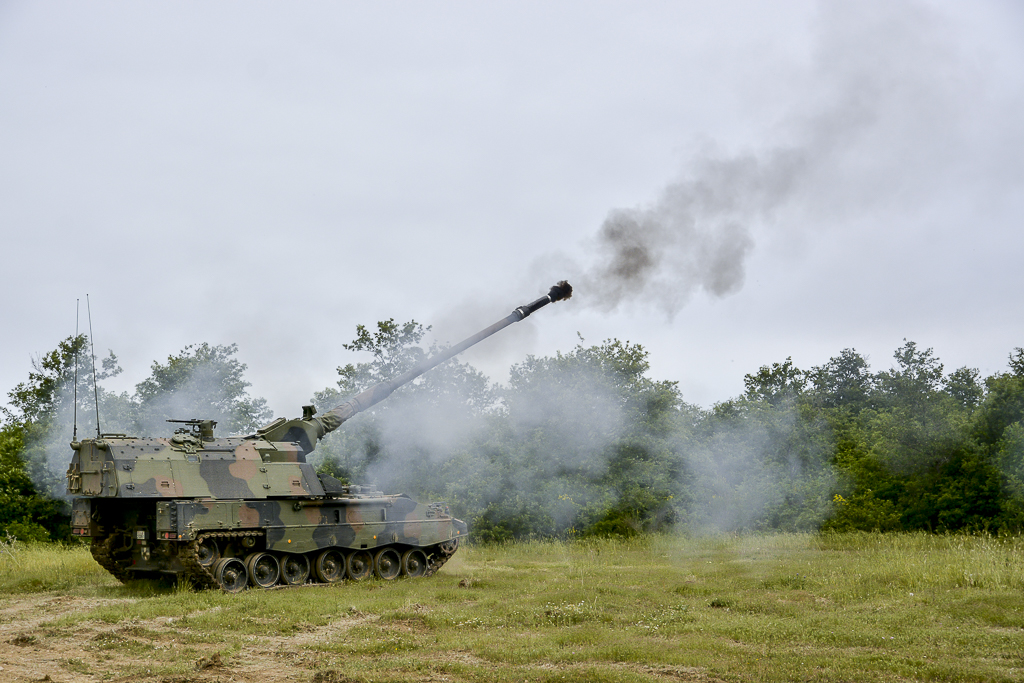
Artillery School/Training Regiment PzH 2000 self-propelled howitzer

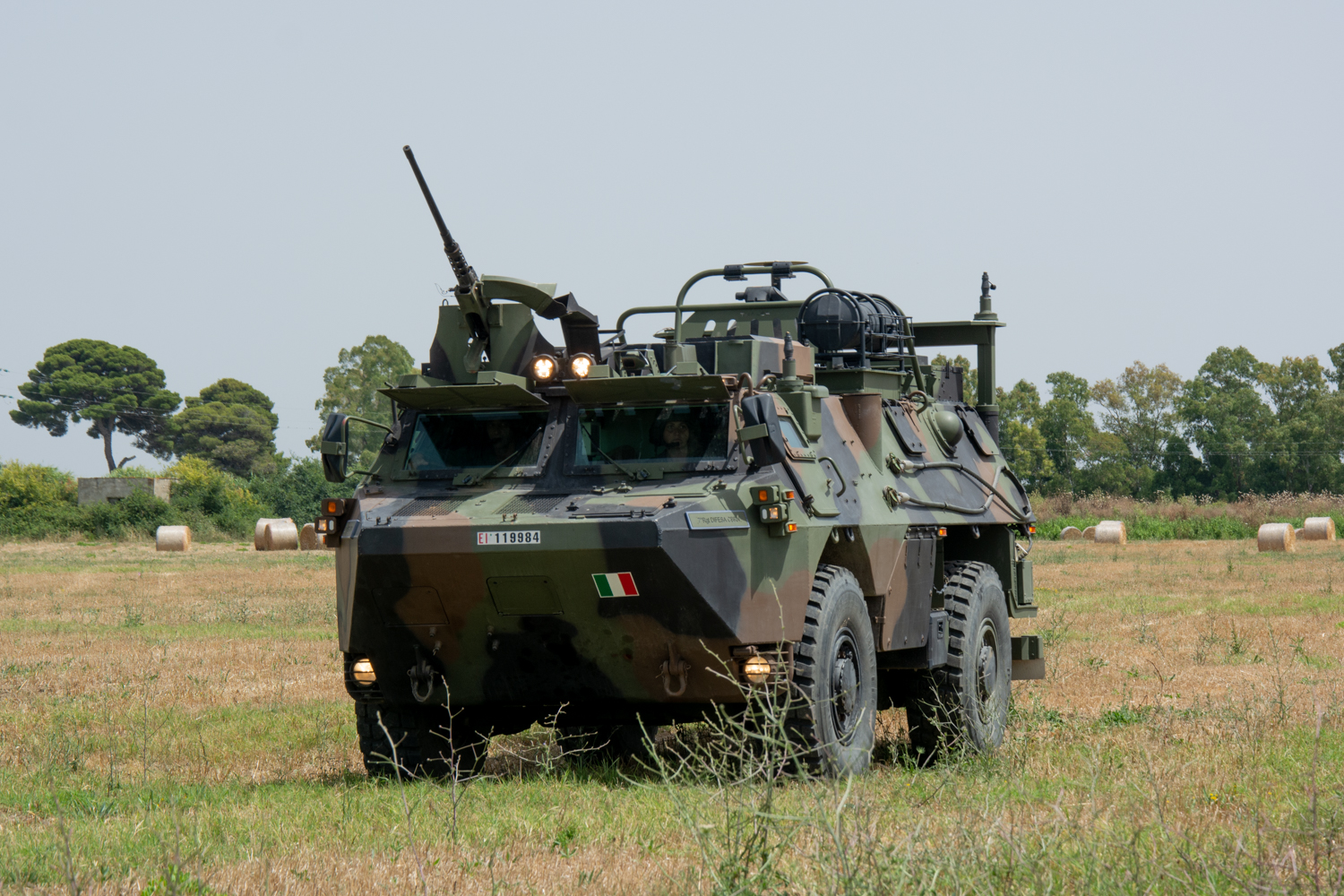
7th CBRN Defense Regiment "Cremona" VBR NBC Plus vehicle

The Artillery Command in Bracciano commands the specialized artillery regiments of the army and trains all officers and troops destined for artillery units. The command is commanded by a one-star general (OF-6).

- Artillery Command, in Bracciano (Lazio)
  - 3rd Targeting Support Regiment "Bondone", in Cassino (Lazio) with unmanned aerial vehicles
  - 5th Field Artillery Regiment "Superga", in Portogruaro (Veneto) with M270A2 MLRS
  - 7th CBRN Defense Regiment "Cremona", in Civitavecchia (Lazio) with VAB armoured personnel carriers in the CBRN configuration
  - 52nd Field Artillery Regiment "Torino", in Persano (Campania) with PzH 2000 self-propelled howitzers
  - Training Group, in Bracciano (Lazio)

===== Anti-aircraft Artillery Command =====
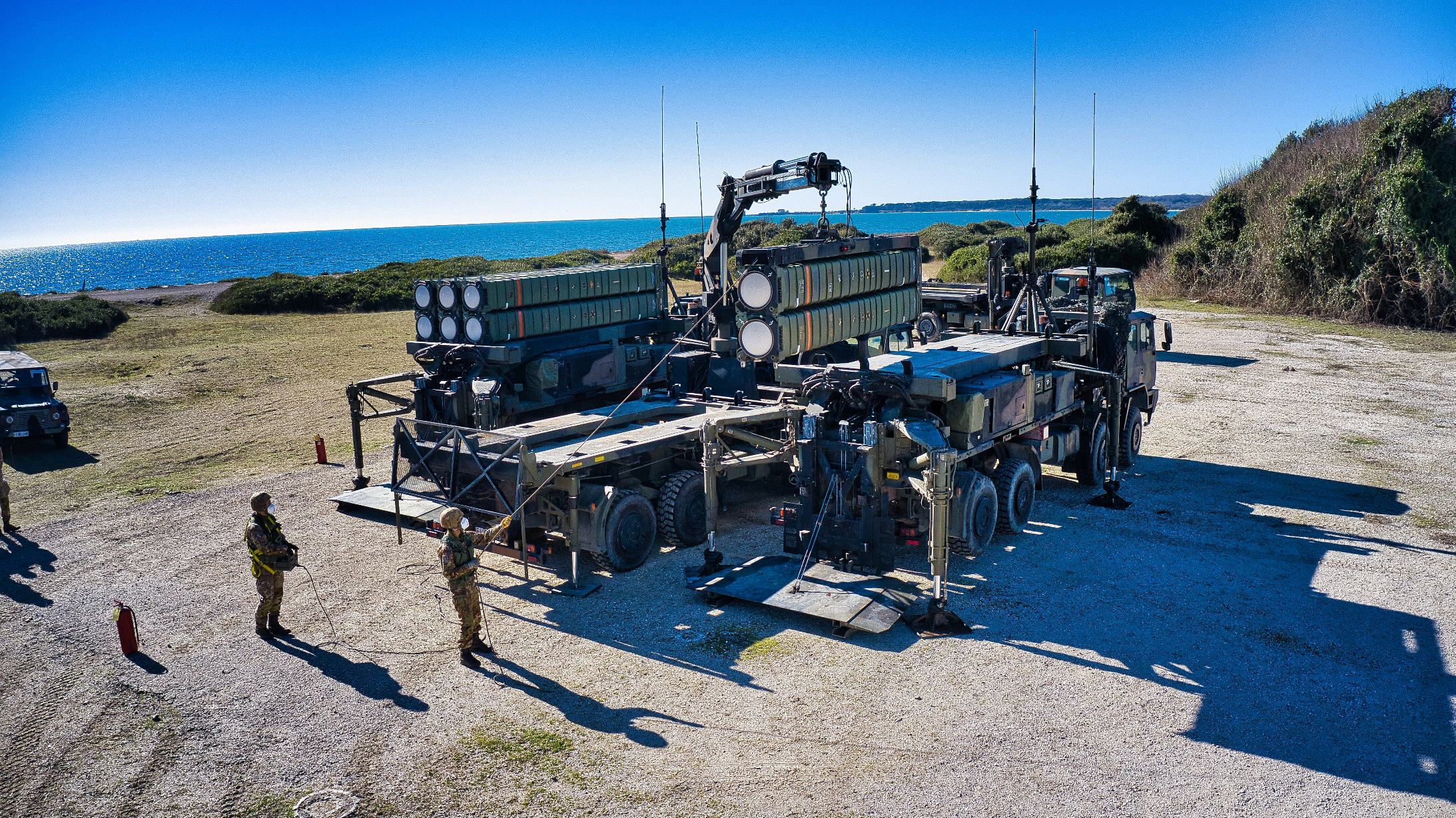
4th Anti-aircraft Artillery Regiment "Peschiera" troops loading SAMP/T missiles

The Anti-aircraft Artillery Command in Sabaudia commands the army's air defense units and trains all officers and troops destined for air defense units. The command is commanded by a one-star general (OF-6).

- Anti-aircraft Artillery Command, in Sabaudia (Lazio)
  - 4th Anti-aircraft Artillery Regiment "Peschiera", in Mantua (Lombardy) with SAMP/T (being replaced by SAMP/T-NG)
  - 17th Anti-aircraft Artillery Regiment "Sforzesca", in Sabaudia (Lazio) with Stinger and GRIFO
  - 121st Anti-aircraft Artillery Regiment "Ravenna", in Bologna (Emilia-Romagna) with Stinger and GRIFO
  - Training Group, in Sabaudia (Lazio)
    - Command and Logistic Support Battery
    - Fire Control and Support Battery
    - Training Battery with SAMP/T-NG, GRIFO, and Skynex
  - Counter-Mini/Micro-UAV Center of Excellence, in Sabaudia (Lazio)

===== Engineer Command =====
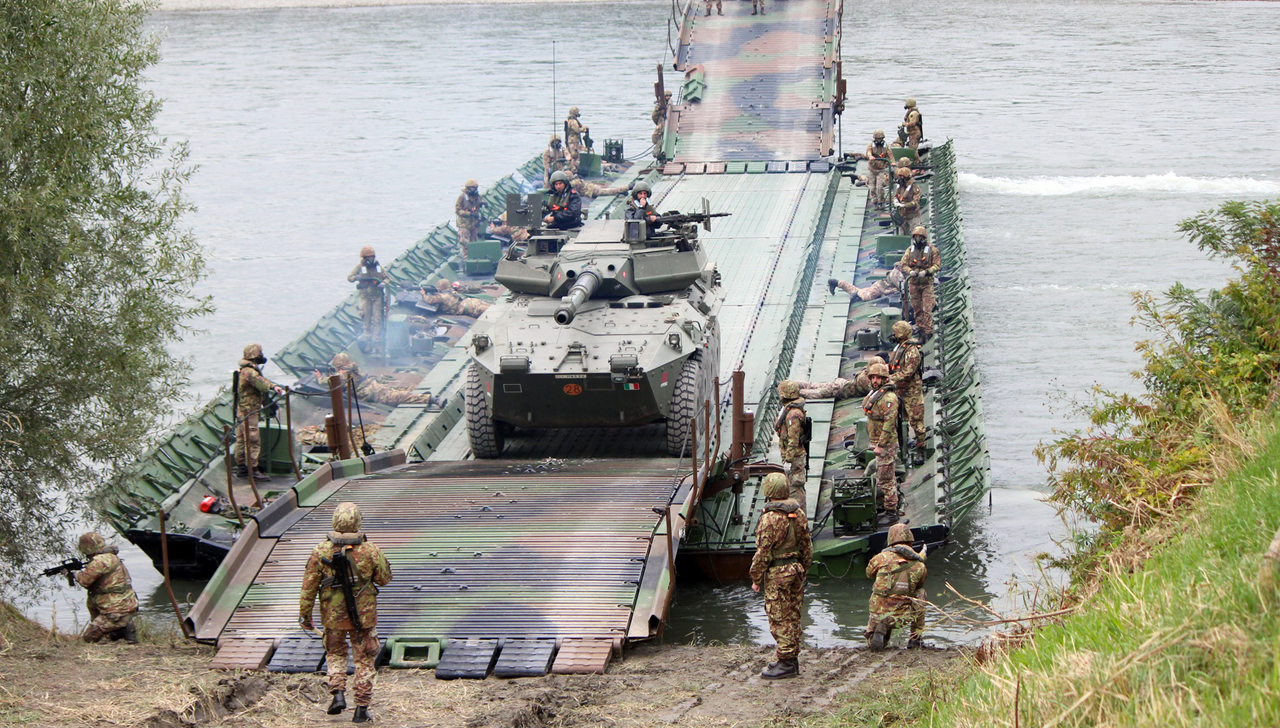
Pontieri ferrying a Regiment "Savoia Cavalleria" (3rd) Centauro tank destroyer across the Po

The Engineer Command in Rome-Cecchignola commands the specialized engineer regiments of the army and trains all officers and troops destined for engineer units. The command is commanded by a one-star general (OF-6).

- Engineer Command, in Cecchignola (Lazio)
  - 2nd Pontieri Engineer Regiment, in Piacenza (Emilia-Romagna)
  - 6th Pioneer Regiment, in Rome-Cecchignola (Lazio)
    - Battalion "Nemi", in Rome-Cecchignola
    - Battalion "Trasimeno", in Rome-Cecchignola
  - Ferrovieri Engineer Regiment, in Castel Maggiore (Emilia-Romagna)
  - Counter-IED Center of Excellence, in Cecchignola (Lazio)
  - Training Battalion, in Cecchignola (Lazio)

===== Signal Command =====
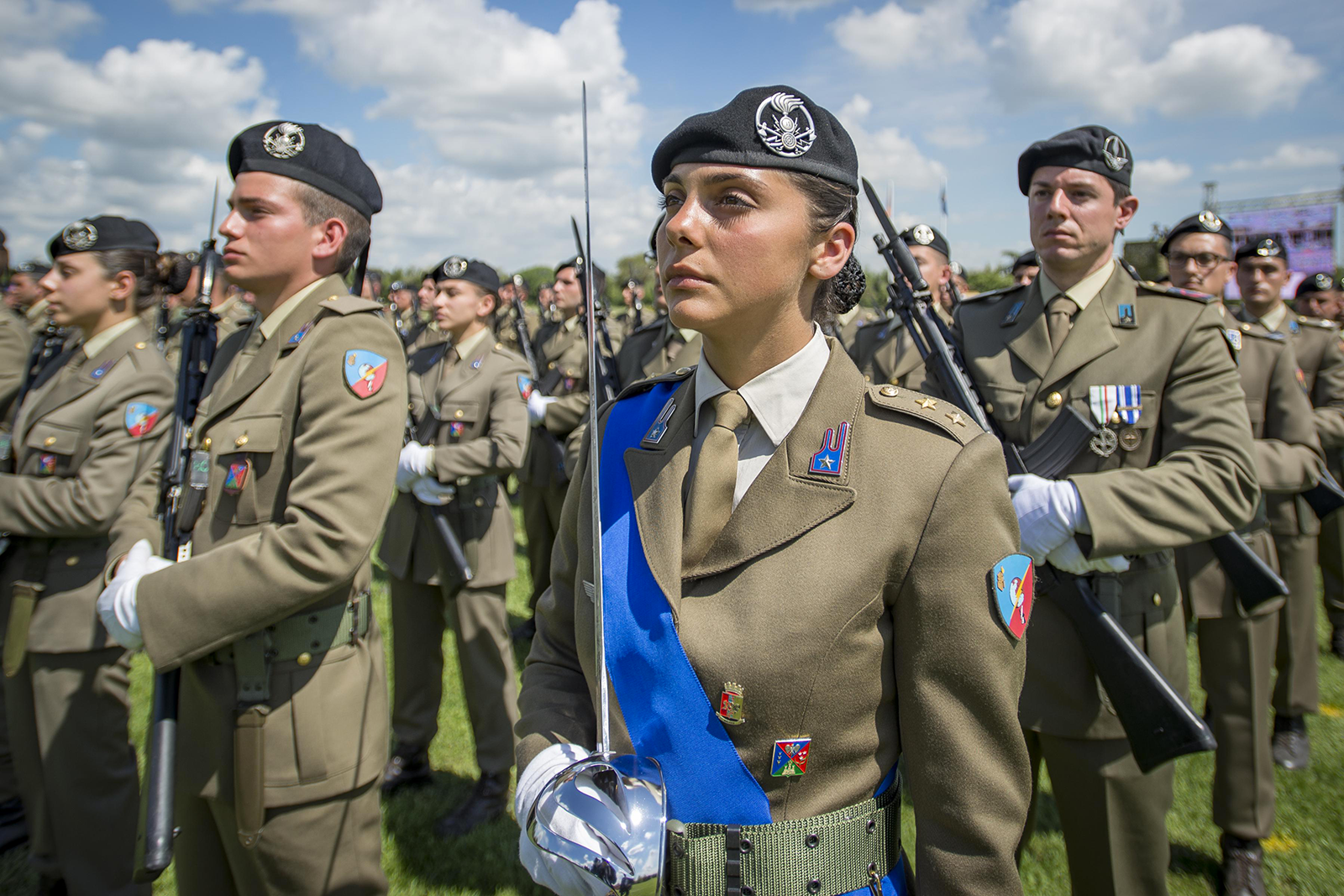
11th Signal Regiment troops at the Italian Army's 156th birthday celebration 2017

The Signal Command in Anzio commands the army's signal regiments and trains all officers and troops destined for signal units. The command is commanded by a one-star general (OF-6).

- Signal Command, in Anzio (Lazio)
  - Signal and IT School, in Rome-Cecchignola (Lazio)
  - Electronic Technical Unit, in Anzio (Lazio)
  - Deployable regiments:
    - 2nd Alpine Signal Regiment, in Bolzano (South Tyrol)
      - Battalion "Gardena"
      - Battalion "Pordoi"
    - 7th Signal Regiment, in Sacile (Friuli-Venezia Giulia)
      - Battalion "Rolle"
      - Battalion "Predil"
    - 11th Signal Regiment, in Civitavecchia (Lazio)
      - Battalion "Leonessa"
      - Battalion "Tonale"
    - 232nd Signal Regiment, in Avellino (Campania)
      - Battalion "Fadalto"
      - Battalion "Legnano"
  - National support regiments:
    - 3rd Signal Regiment, in Rome (Lazio)
      - Battalion "Lanciano", in Rome (Lazio)
      - Battalion "Abetone", in Florence (Tuscany)
      - Battalion "Gennargentu", in Cagliari (Sardinia)
    - 32nd Signal Regiment, in Padua (Veneto)
      - Battalion "Valles", in Padua (Veneto)
      - Battalion "Frejus", in Turin (Piedmont)
    - 46th Signal Regiment, in Palermo (Sicily)
      - Battalion "Mongibello", in Palermo (Sicily)
      - Battalion "Vulture", in Nocera Inferiore (Campania)

===== Tactical Intelligence Brigade =====
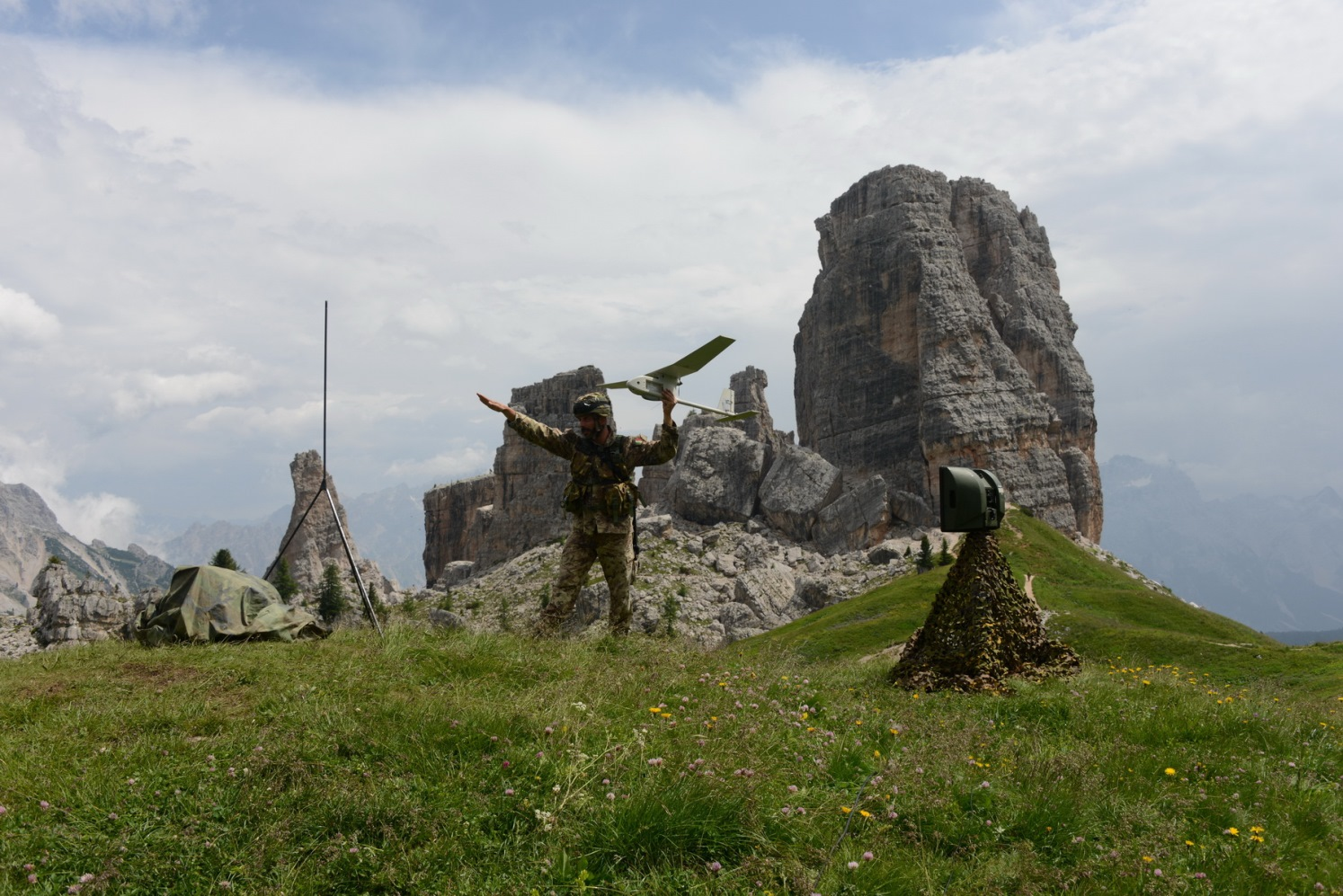
41st Regiment "Cordenons" operator launching a RQ-11B Raven in the Dolomites with a Squire radar in the background

The Tactical Intelligence Brigade in Anzio is the army's Intelligence, surveillance, target acquisition, and reconnaissance (ISTAR) & Electronic Warfare (EW) unit.

- Tactical Intelligence Brigade, in Anzio (Lazio)
  - 7th CIMIC Regiment, in Motta di Livenza (Veneto), multinational, NATO-assigned Civil-military co-operation (CIMIC) unit with troops from Greece, Hungary, Italy, Portugal and Romania
  - 9th Cybernetic Security Regiment "Rombo", in Rome-Cecchignola (Lazio)
  - 13th HUMINT Regiment, in Anzio (Lazio), Human Intelligence (HUMINT) unit
  - 28th Regiment "Pavia", in Pesaro (Marche), Operational Communications unit
  - 33rd EW Regiment, in Treviso (Veneto), Electronic Warfare (EW) unit
  - 41st IMINT Regiment "Cordenons", in Sora (Lazio), Imagery intelligence (IMINT) unit with RQ-7 Shadow 200, RQ-11B Raven and Bramor C4EYE UAVs, IA-3 Colibrì quadcopters, Thales SQUIRE ground surveillance radars, and ARTHUR counter-battery radars
  - Land Integrated Analysis Unit, in Anzio
  - Electronic Warfare Operational Support Unit, in Anzio
  - Tactical Intelligence Training Center, in Anzio

==== Army Aviation Command ====
The Army Aviation Command is based at Viterbo Airport and commanded by a two-star general (OF-7).

- Army Aviation Command, at Viterbo Airport (Lazio)

===== Airmobile Brigade "Friuli" =====
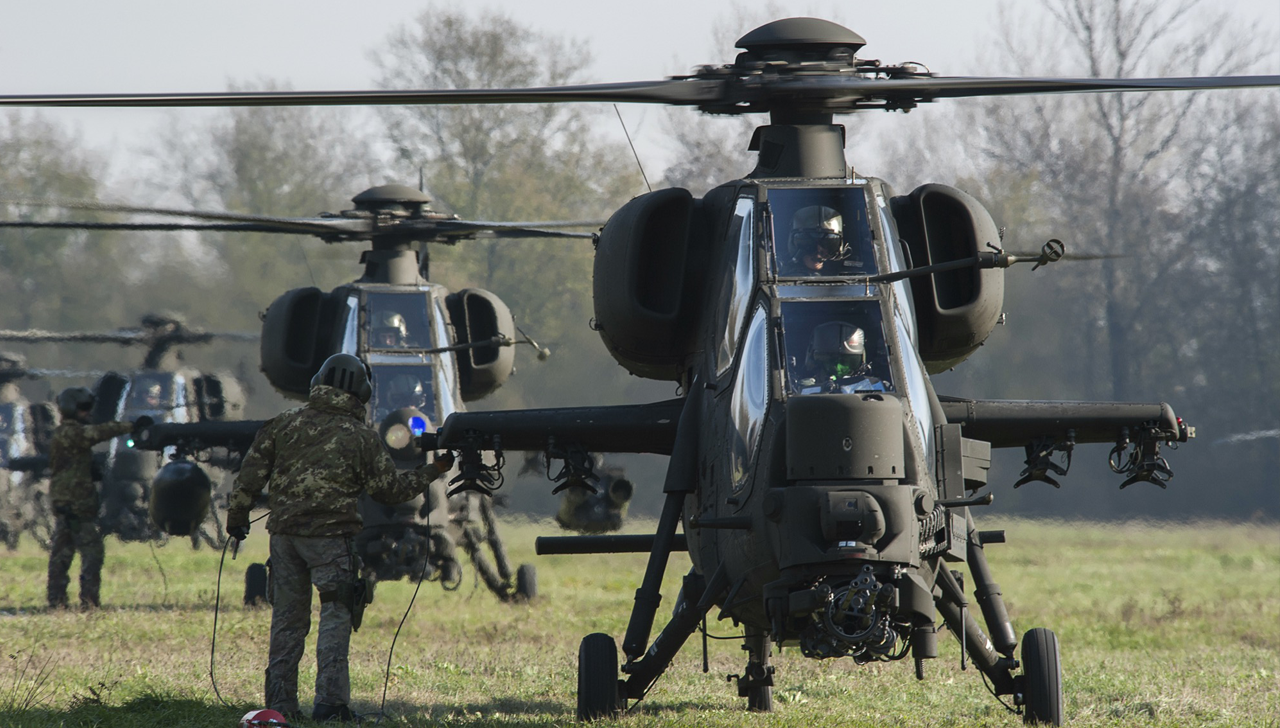
5th Army Aviation Regiment "Rigel" A129D Mangusta attack helicopters

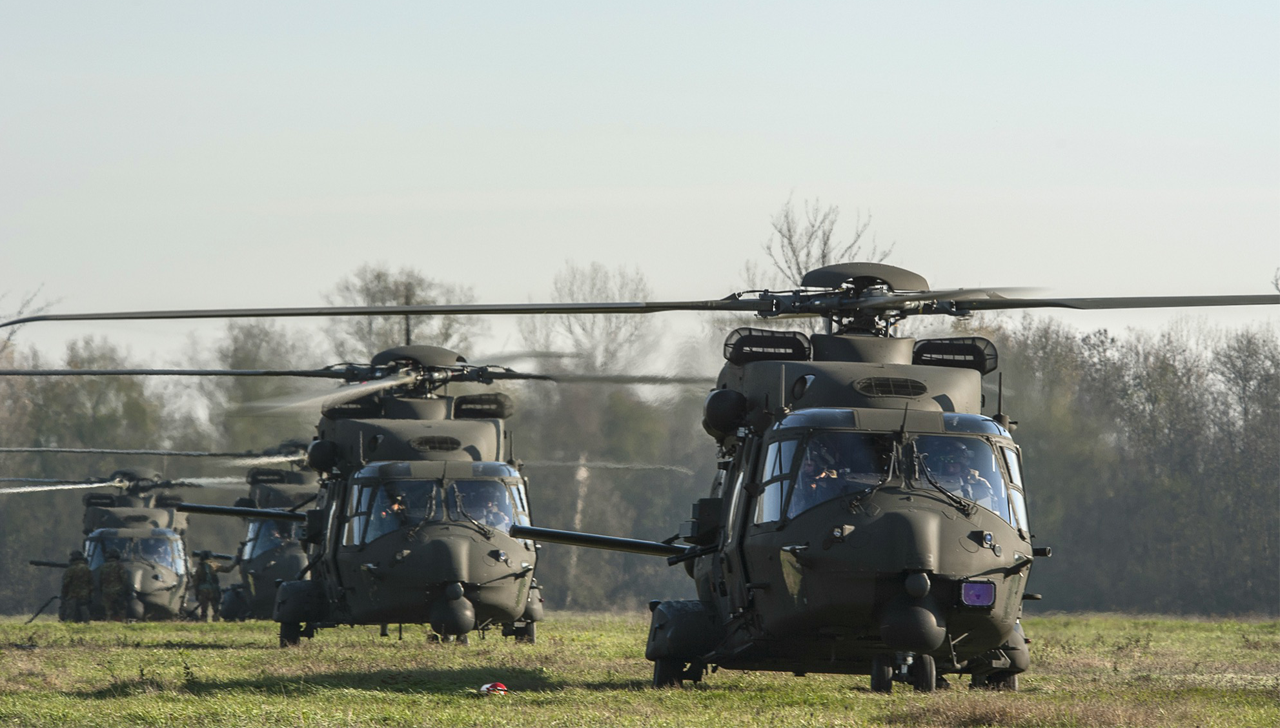
7th Army Aviation Regiment "Vega" NH90 transport helicopters

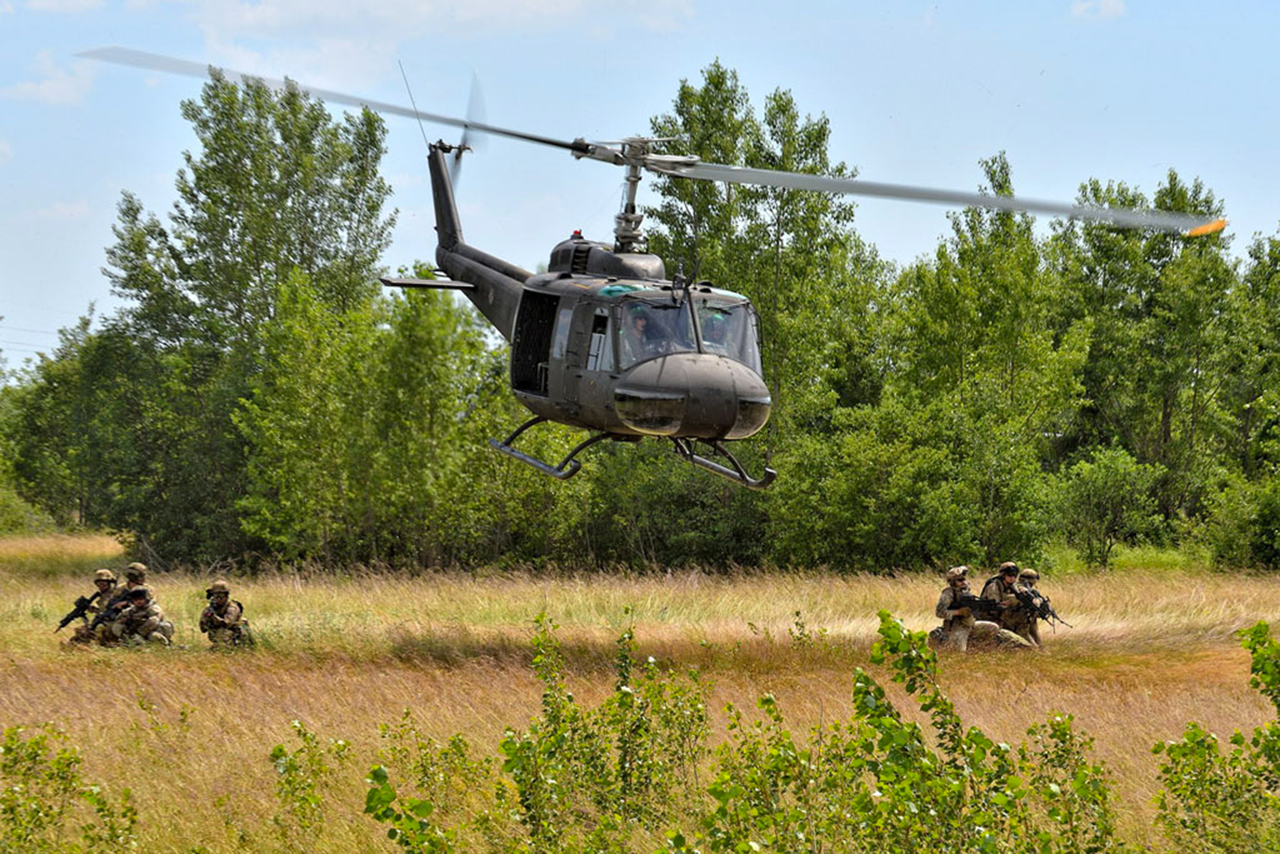
Army Aviation AB 205A helicopter

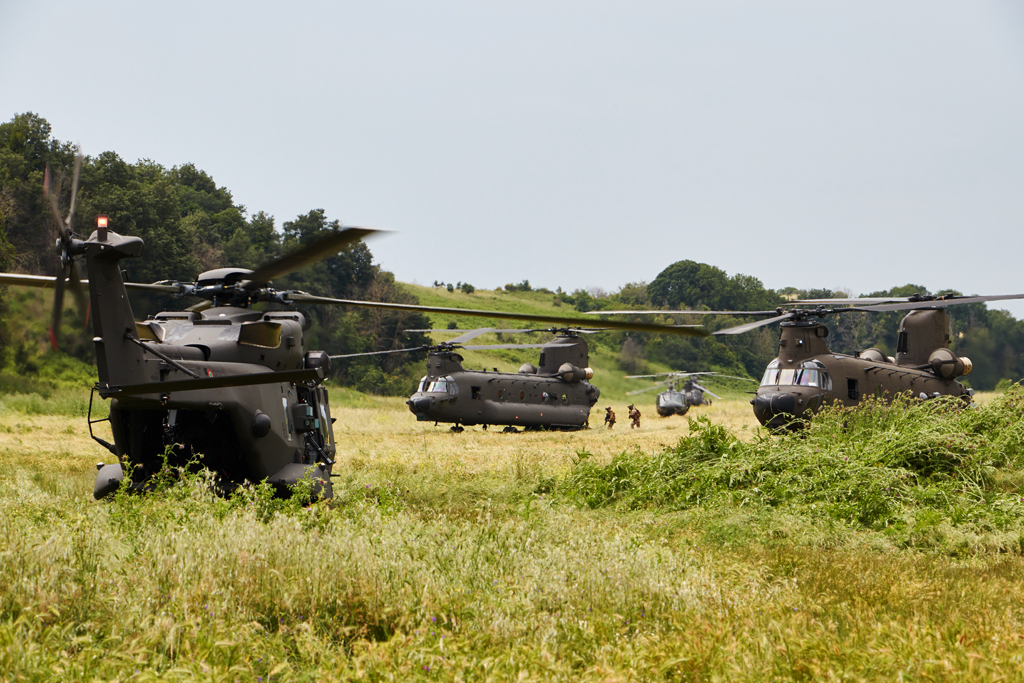
Army Aviation NH90 and CH-47F transport helicopters

- Airmobile Brigade "Friuli", in Bologna (Emilia-Romagna)
  - 87th Command and Tactical Supports Unit "Friuli", in Bologna (Emilia-Romagna)
  - 1st Army Aviation Regiment "Antares", at Viterbo Airport (Lazio)
    - 11th Squadrons Group "Ercole" with CH-47F Chinook helicopters
    - 28th Squadrons Group "Tucano", at Viterbo Airport (Lazio)
      - Regional Transport and Liaison Planes Squadron, with P180 Avanti II planes
      - Light Transport and Liaison Planes Squadron, with Dornier 228-212 planes
      - UAV squadron, with RQ-7 Shadow 200 drones
    - 51st Squadrons Group "Leone", at Viterbo Airport (Lazio) with three NH90 transport helicopter squadrons
    - Support Squadrons Group
  - 2nd Army Aviation Regiment "Sirio", at Lamezia Terme Airport (Calabria)
    - Command and Logistic Support Squadron
    - 21st Detachment "Orsa Maggiore", at Elmas Airport (Sardinia) with AB 412HP helicopters
    - 30th Squadrons Group "Pegaso", at Lamezia Terme Airport, with AB 412HP and UH-169D helicopters
    - Maintenance Squadron
  - 3rd Special Operations Helicopter Regiment "Aldebaran", at Viterbo Airport (Lazio)
    - 26th Squadrons Group "Giove" with one CH-47F ER Chinook, one AB AB 412HP, and one NH90 squadron
    - Support Squadrons Group
  - 4th Army Aviation Regiment "Altair", at Bolzano Airport (South Tyrol)
    - Command and Logistic Support Squadron
    - 34th Detachment "Toro", at Venaria Reale Airport (Piedmont) with AB 205A helicopters (being replaced by UH-169D helicopters)
    - 54th Squadrons Group "Cefeo", at Bolzano Airport, with AB 205A helicopters (being replaced by UH-169D helicopters)
    - Maintenance Squadron
  - 5th Army Aviation Regiment "Rigel", at Casarsa Airport (Friuli-Venezia Giulia)
    - 27th Squadrons Group "Mercurio" with two NH90 transport helicopter squadrons and one A109A EOA reconnaissance helicopter squadron
    - 49th Squadrons Group "Capricorno" with three A129D Mangusta Attack Helicopter squadrons
    - Support Squadrons Group "Lupo"
  - 7th Army Aviation Regiment "Vega", at Rimini Airport (Emilia-Romagna)
    - 25th Squadrons Group "Cigno" with three NH90 transport helicopter squadrons
    - 48th Squadrons Group "Pavone" with three A129D Mangusta attack helicopter squadrons
    - Support Squadrons Group
  - 66th Airmobile Infantry Regiment "Trieste", in Forlì (Emilia-Romagna) with VTLM Lince vehicles
  - Military Training Range "Foce Reno", in Casal Borsetti

===== Army Aviation Training Center =====
- Army Aviation Training Center, at Viterbo Airport (Lazio) (co-located with the Italian Air Force's 72nd (Helicopter Training) Wing)
  - Command and Tactical Supports Unit "AVES", at Viterbo Airport (Lazio)
    - 1st Command and Tactical Supports Battalion
      - Command Company
      - Supply Company
      - Transport Company
  - 1st Training Squadrons Group "Auriga", at Viterbo Airport (Lazio) with AB 205A, AB 206C, and UH-169B helicopters
  - Specialists/Land Training Unit

===== Army Aviation Support Brigade =====
The brigade's units provide maintenance services and logistic support to the army's fleet of helicopters and airplanes.

- Army Aviation Support Brigade, at Viterbo Airport (Lazio)
  - 1st Army Aviation Support Regiment "Idra", at Oscar Savini Airfield near Bracciano (Lazio)
  - 2nd Army Aviation Support Regiment "Orione", at Borgo Panigale Airport (Emilia-Romagna)
  - 3rd Army Aviation Support Regiment "Aquila", at Orio al Serio Airport (Lombardy)
  - 4th Army Aviation Support Squadrons Group "Scorpione", at Viterbo Airport (Lazio)

==== Army Special Forces Command ====
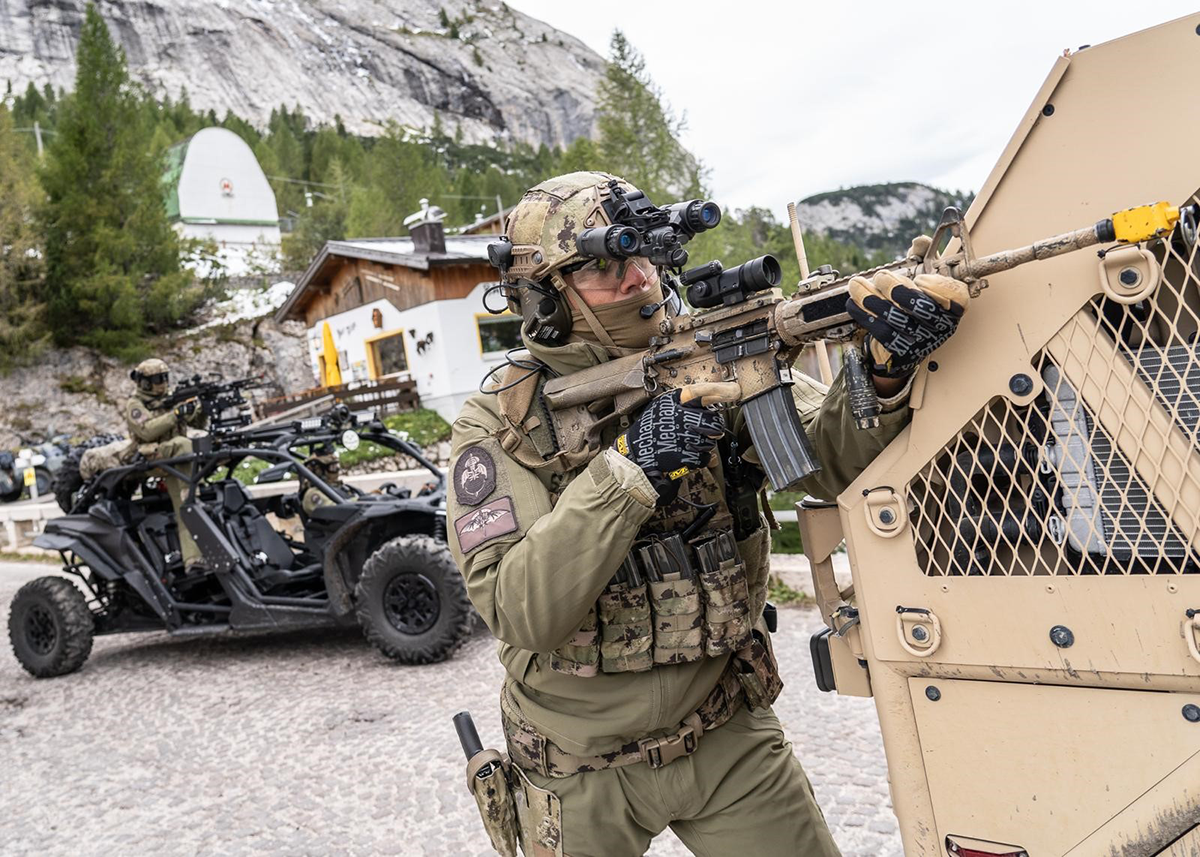
185th Paratroopers Reconnaissance Target Acquisition Regiment "Folgore" operators during the Stella Alpina exercise 2024

The Army Special Forces Command (Comando delle Forze Speciali dell'Esercito (COMFOSE)) in Pisa commands the army's special operation forces. The command is commanded by a one-star general (OF-6).

- Army Special Forces Command, at Camp Darby (Tuscany)
  - 4th Alpini Paratroopers Regiment, in Montorio Veronese (Veneto)
    - Alpini Paratroopers Battalion "Monte Cervino"
    - Operational Support Battalion "Intra"
  - 9th Paratroopers Assault Regiment "Col Moschin", at Camp Darby (Tuscany)
    - 1st Raiders Battalion
    - Operational Support Battalion
    - Raiders Training Unit
  - 185th Paratroopers Reconnaissance Target Acquisition Regiment "Folgore", in Livorno (Tuscany) (will move to Camp Darby)
    - 3rd Target Acquirers Battalion "Poggio Rusco"
    - Operational Support Battalion
  - Special Operations Support Unit, at Camp Darby
    - Command and Logistic Support Company
    - Signal Company
  - Special Operations Training Center, at Camp Darby
    - 1st Basic Training Company
    - 2nd Advanced Training Company

==== Paratroopers Brigade "Folgore" ====
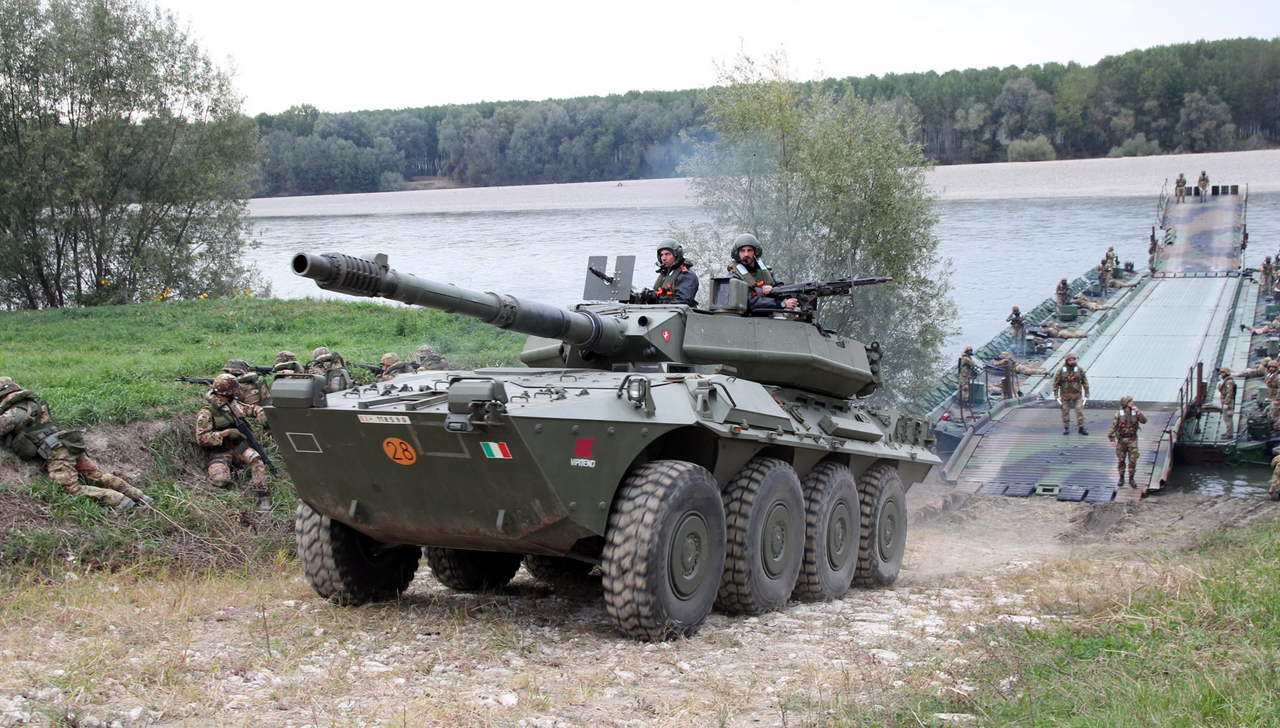
Regiment "Savoia Cavalleria" (3rd) Centauro tank destroyer

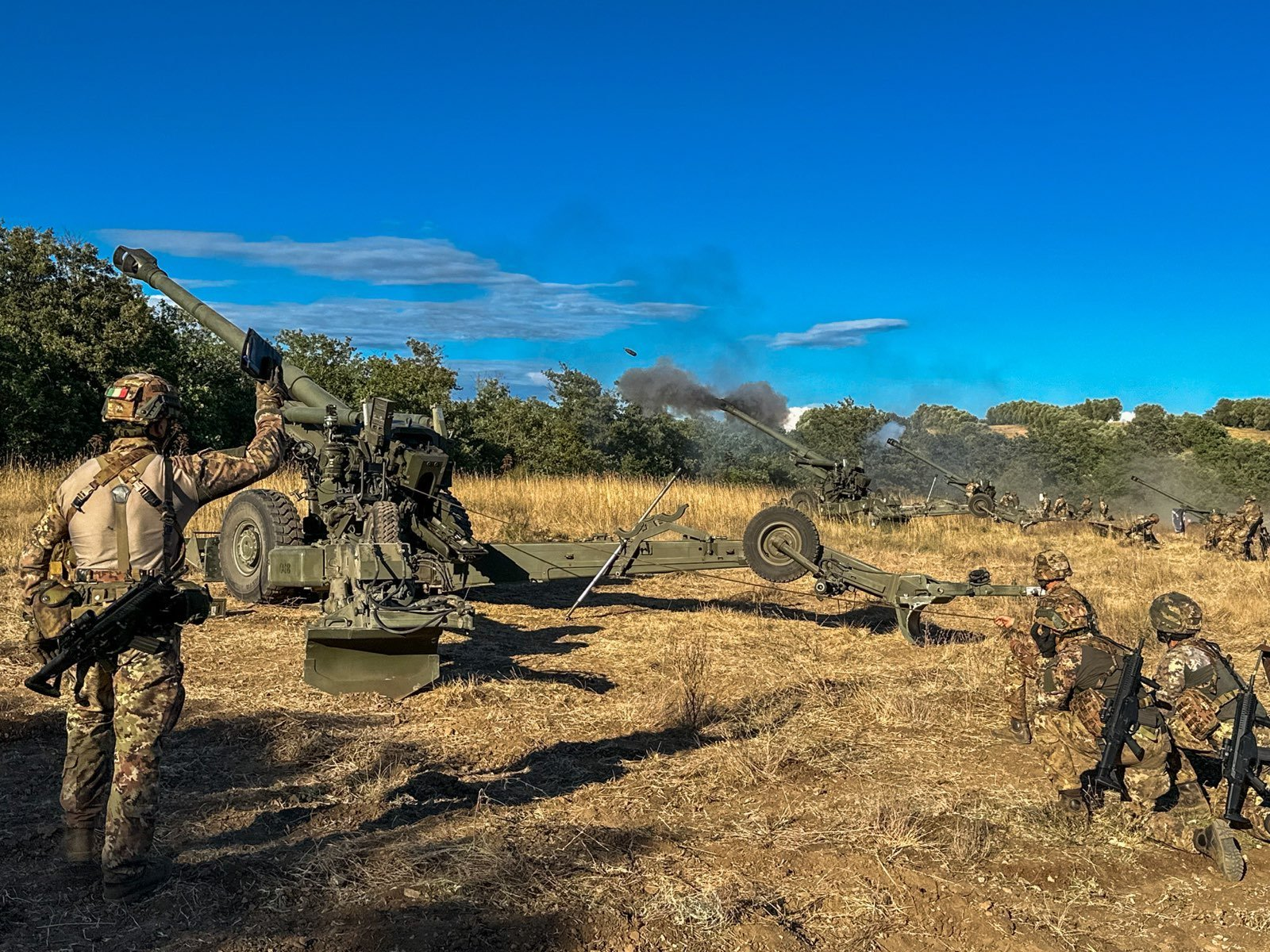
185th Paratroopers Artillery Regiment "Folgore" FH70 howitzers during an exercise at Monte Romano

- Paratroopers Brigade "Folgore", in Livorno (Tuscany)
  - 184th Paratroopers Command and Tactical Supports Unit "Nembo", in Livorno
  - Regiment "Savoia Cavalleria" (3rd), in Grosseto (Tuscany) with Centauro tank destroyers
  - 183rd Paratroopers Regiment "Nembo", in Pistoia (Tuscany) with VTLM Lince vehicles
  - 186th Paratroopers Regiment "Folgore", in Siena (Tuscany) with VTLM Lince vehicles
  - 187th Paratroopers Regiment "Folgore", in Livorno (Tuscany) with VTLM Lince vehicles
  - 185th Paratroopers Artillery Regiment "Folgore", in Bracciano (Lazio) with 120mm mortars and FH-70 towed howitzers
  - 8th Paratroopers Engineer Regiment "Folgore", in Legnago (Veneto)
  - Logistic Regiment "Folgore", in Pisa (Tuscany)
  - Parachuting Training Center, in Pisa (Tuscany)
    - Training Battalion "Poggio Rusco", in Pisa (Tuscany)
    - Aviation Supply Battalion, in Pisa (Tuscany)

==== COMFOTER Deputy Commander ====
The Operational Land Forces Command Deputy Commander is responsible for the combat forces assigned to the command. The deputy commander is a three-star general and has oversight of the following units:

===== Alpine Troops Command =====
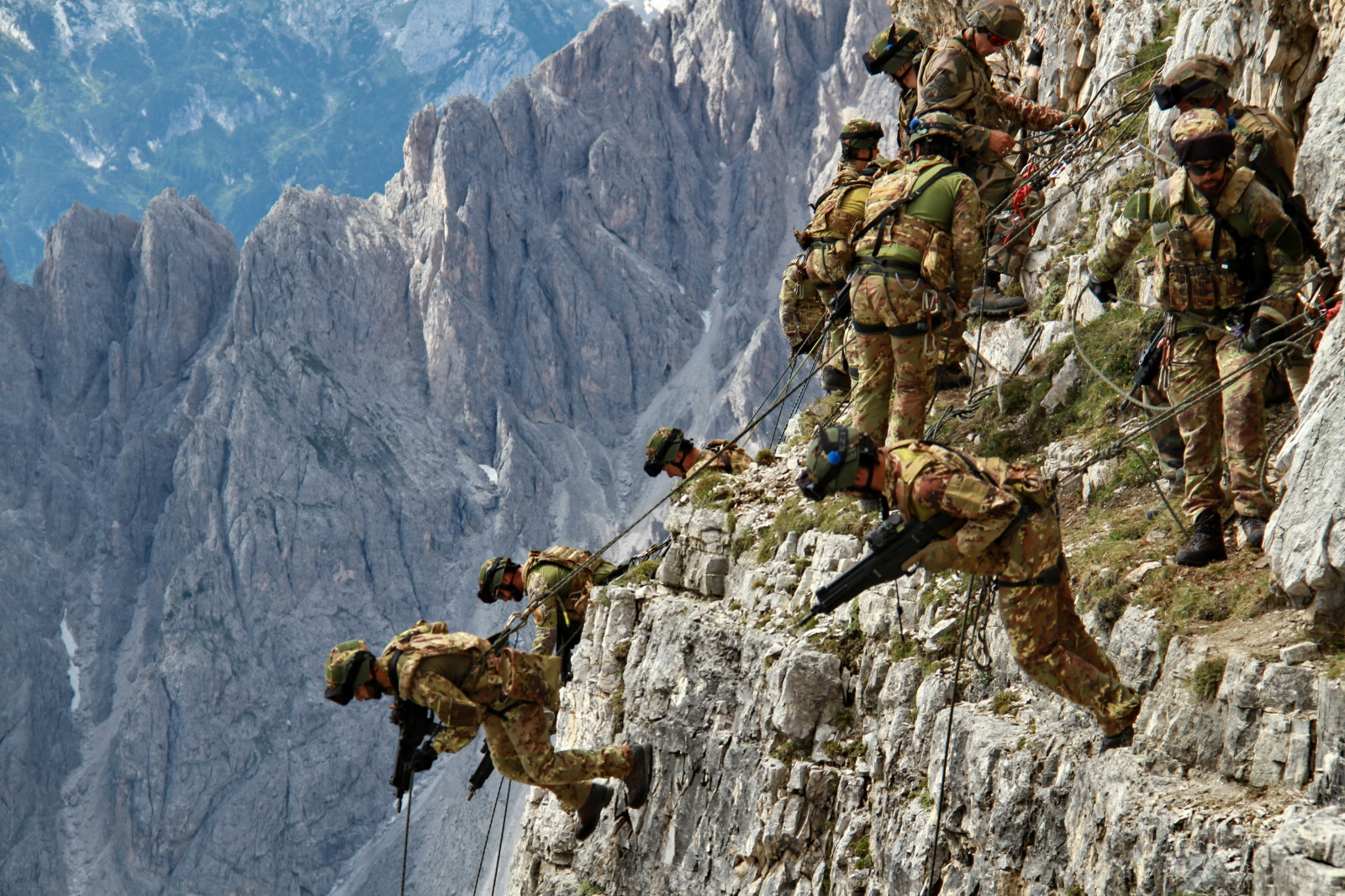
Alpini abseiling in the Dolomites

The Alpine Troops Command (Italian: Comando Truppe Alpine, abbreviation: COMTA) commands the Mountain Troops of the Italian Army, called Alpini (English: Alpines). The command is headquartered in Bolzano and commanded by a three-star general (OF-8).

- Alpine Troops Command, in Bolzano (South Tyrol)
  - Command and Tactical Supports Unit "Tridentina", in Bolzano (South Tyrol)

====== Alpine Brigade "Taurinense" ======
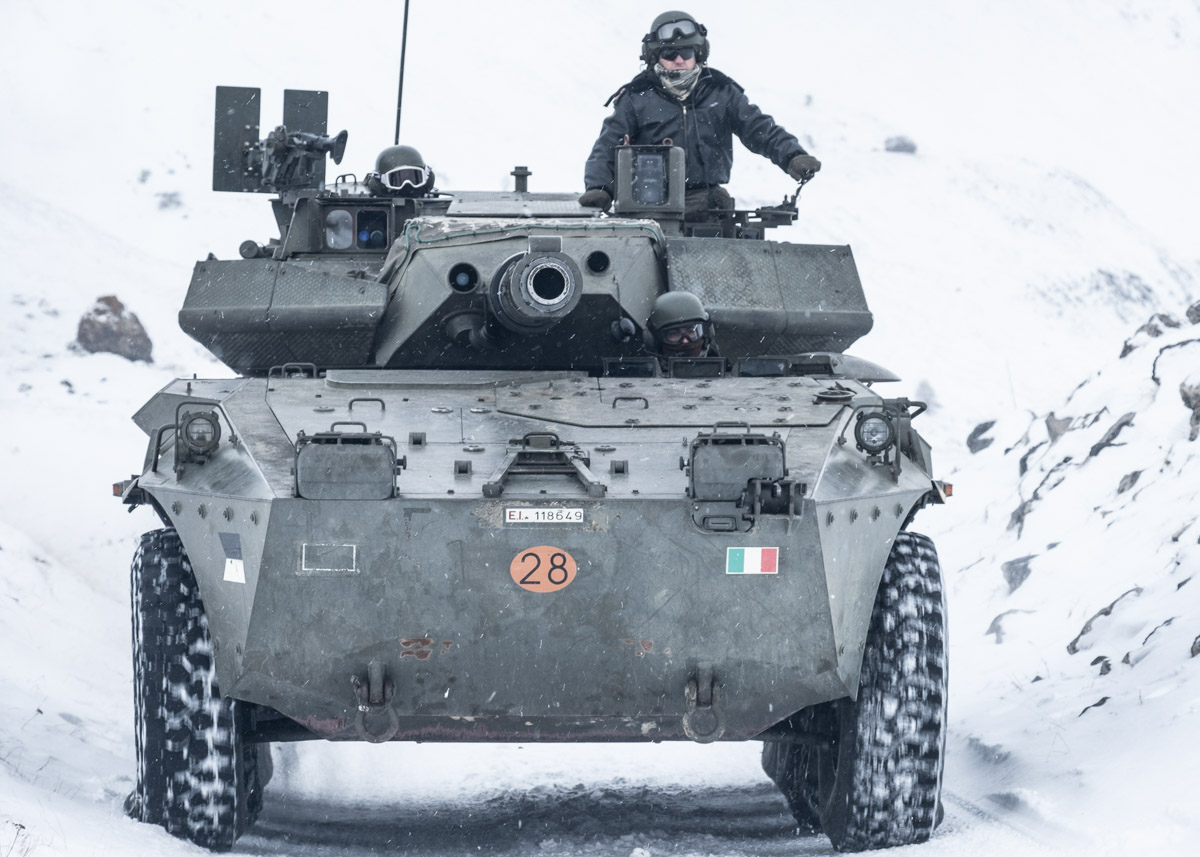
Regiment "Nizza Cavalleria" (1st) Centauro tank destroyer during a training exercise in Valloire, France

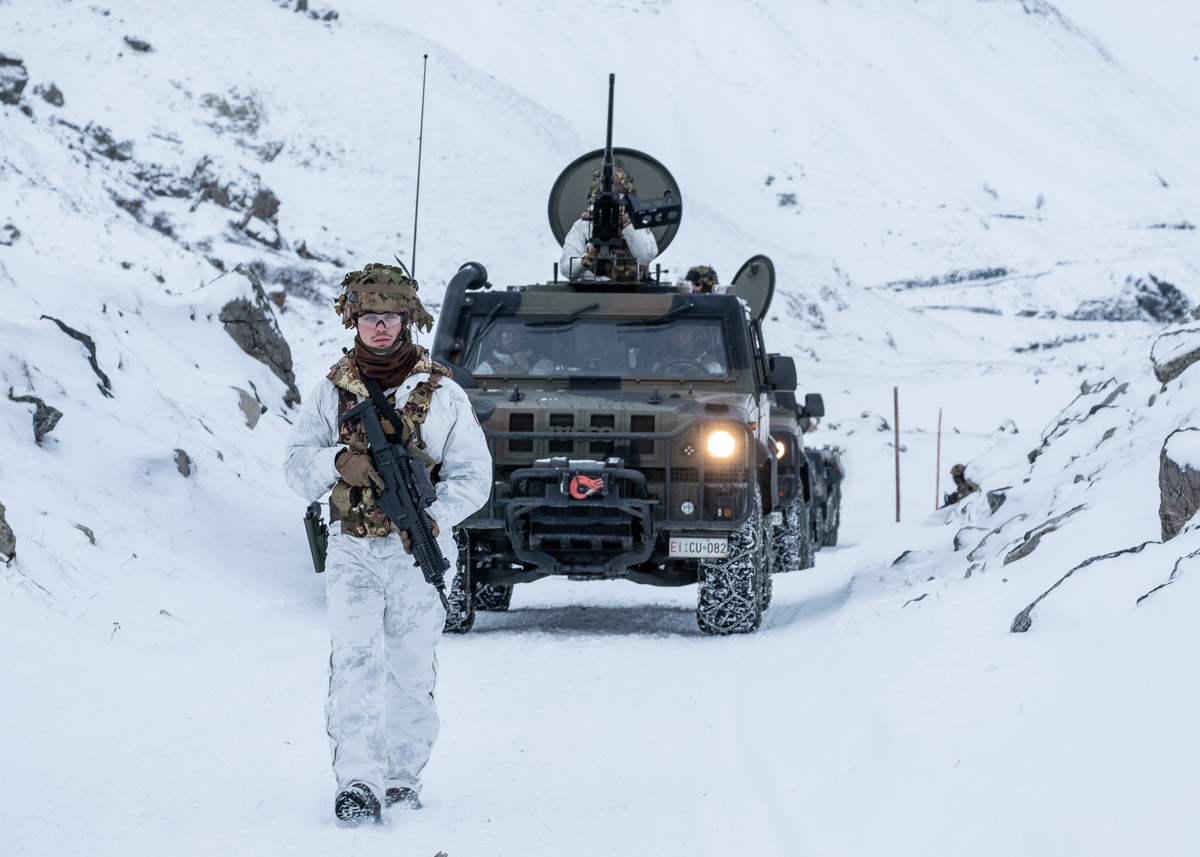
2nd Alpini Regiment soldier and VTML Lince vehicles during a training exercise in Valloire, France

- Alpine Brigade "Taurinense", in Turin (Piedmont)
  - 1st Alpini Command and Tactical Supports Unit, in Turin
  - Regiment "Nizza Cavalleria" (1st), in Bellinzago Novarese (Piedmont) with Centauro tank destroyers
  - 2nd Alpini Regiment, in Cuneo (Piedmont) with Bv206S and VTLM Lince vehicles
  - 3rd Alpini Regiment, in Pinerolo (Piedmont) with Bv206S and VTLM Lince vehicles
  - 9th Alpini Regiment, in L'Aquila (Abruzzo) with Bv206S and VTLM Lince vehicles
    - Alpini Battalion "L'Aquila"
    - Multifunctional Battalion "Vicenza"
  - 1st Field Artillery Regiment (Mountain), in Fossano (Piedmont) with FH-70 towed howitzers and Mod 56 105mm pack howitzers
  - 32nd Engineer Regiment, in Fossano (Piedmont)
  - Logistic Regiment "Taurinense", in Rivoli (Piedmont)

====== Alpine Brigade "Julia" ======
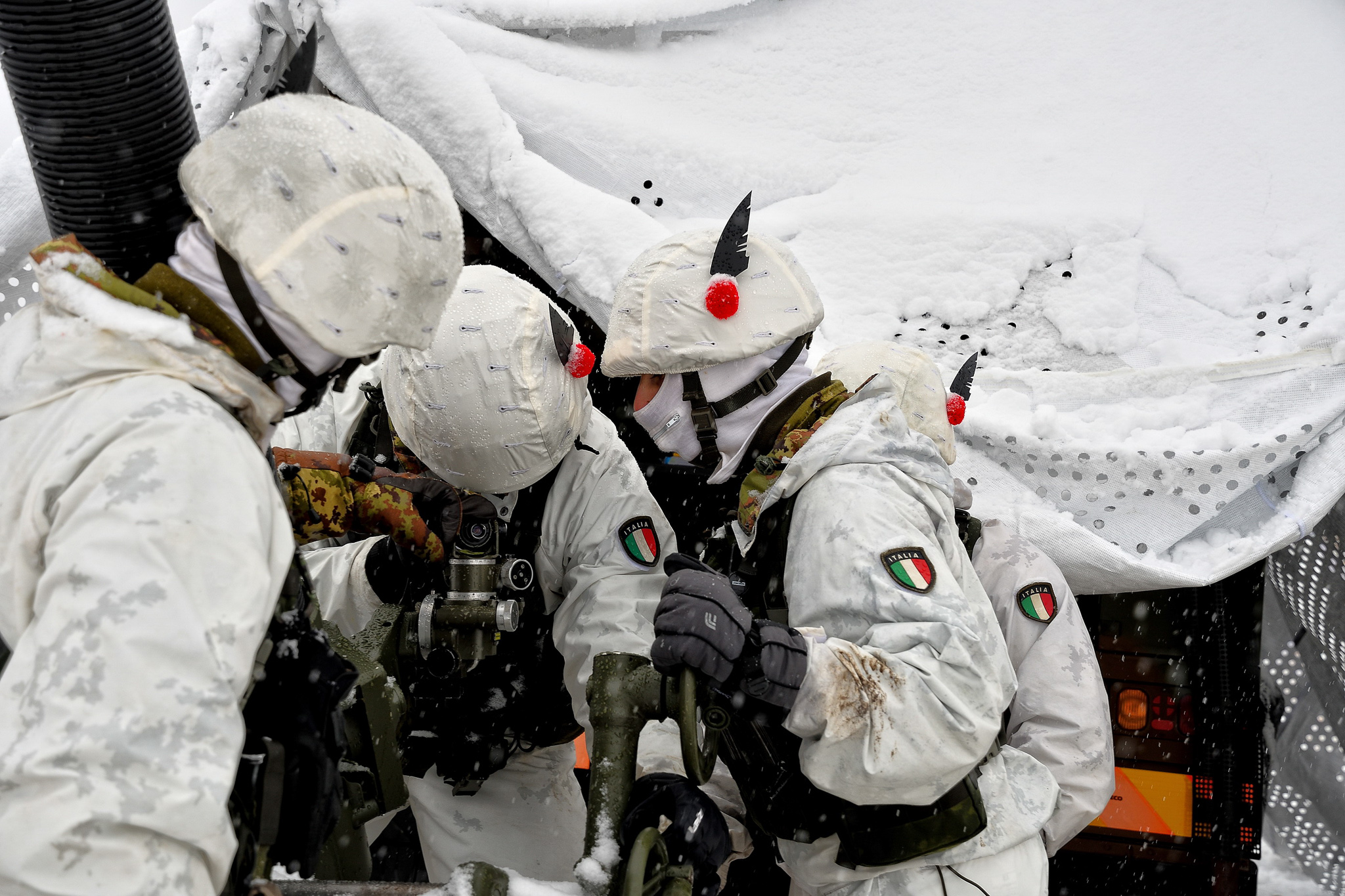
8th Alpini Regiment mortar team

- Alpine Brigade "Julia", in Udine (Friuli-Venezia Giulia)
  - 14th Alpini Command and Tactical Supports Unit, in Udine
  - Regiment "Piemonte Cavalleria" (2nd), in Villa Opicina (Friuli-Venezia Giulia) with Centauro tank destroyers
  - 5th Alpini Regiment, in Sterzing (South Tyrol) with Bv206S and VTLM Lince vehicles
  - 7th Alpini Regiment, in Belluno (Veneto) with Bv206S and VTLM Lince vehicles
  - 8th Alpini Regiment, in Venzone (Friuli-Venezia Giulia) with Bv206S and VTLM Lince vehicles
  - 3rd Field Artillery Regiment (Mountain), in Remanzacco (Friuli-Venezia Giulia) with FH-70 towed howitzers and Mod 56 105mm pack howitzers
  - 2nd Engineer Regiment, in Trento (Trentino)
  - Logistic Regiment "Julia", in Merano (South Tyrol)

====== Alpine Training Center ======
The Alpine Training Center trains Italian troops in mountain warfare and winter warfare and its 6th Alpini Regiment prepares and manages the army's military exercises in the Puster Valley.

- Alpine Training Center, in Aosta (Aosta)
  - 6th Alpini Regiment, in Bruneck (South Tyrol)
  - Training Battalion, in Aosta (Aosta)
  - Sport Department, in Courmayeur (Aosta)

===== Multinational Division South =====
The Multinational Division South (MND-S) is a multinational, NATO-assigned deployable division command headquartered in Florence. The division is commanded by a two-star general (OF-7).

- Multinational Division South, in Florence (Tuscany)
  - 78th Command and Tactical Supports Unit "Lupi di Toscana", in Florence (Tuscany)

====== 132nd Armored Brigade "Ariete" ======
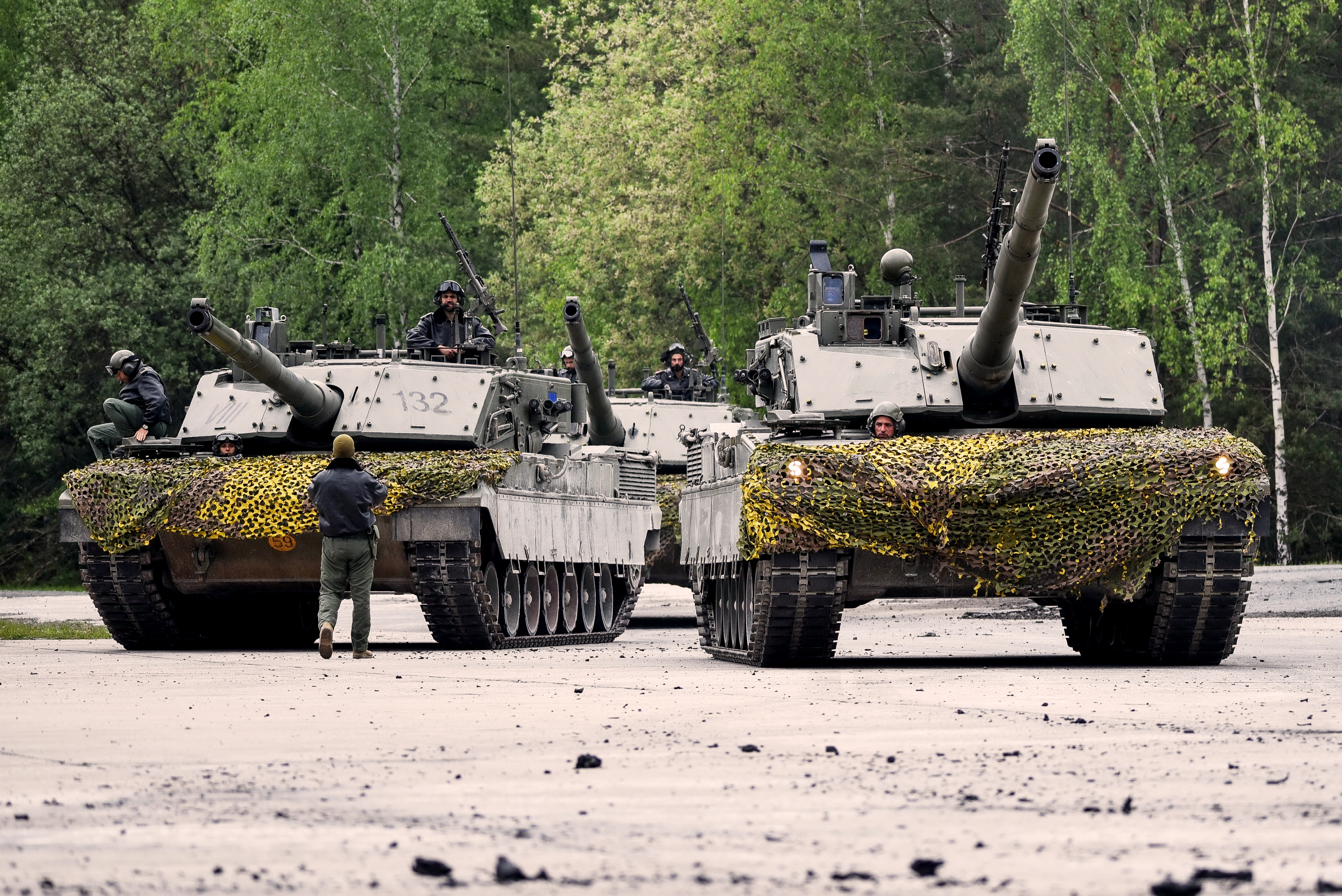
8th Tank Battalion "M.O. Secchiaroli" / 132nd Tank Regiment Ariete main battle tanks

- 132nd Armored Brigade "Ariete", in Pordenone (Friuli-Venezia Giulia)
  - 7th Tank Command and Tactical Supports Unit "M.O. Di Dio", in Pordenone (Friuli-Venezia Giulia)
  - Regiment "Lancieri di Novara" (5th), in Codroipo (Friuli-Venezia Giulia) with Centauro tank destroyers
  - 32nd Tank Regiment, in Tauriano (Friuli-Venezia Giulia) with Ariete main battle tanks
  - 132nd Tank Regiment, in Cordenons (Friuli-Venezia Giulia) with Ariete main battle tanks
  - 11th Bersaglieri Regiment, in Orcenico Superiore (Friuli-Venezia Giulia) with Dardo infantry fighting vehicles
  - 132nd Field Artillery Regiment "Ariete", in Maniago (Friuli-Venezia Giulia) with PzH 2000 self-propelled howitzers
  - 10th Engineer Regiment, in Cremona (Lombardy)
  - Logistic Regiment "Ariete", in Maniago (Friuli-Venezia Giulia)

====== Cavalry Brigade "Pozzuolo del Friuli" ======
- Cavalry Brigade "Pozzuolo del Friuli", in Gorizia (Friuli-Venezia Giulia)
  - Command and Tactical Supports Unit "Cavalleggeri di Treviso" (28th), in Gorizia (Friuli-Venezia Giulia)
  - Regiment "Genova Cavalleria" (4th), in Palmanova (Friuli-Venezia Giulia) with Centauro tank destroyers
  - Lagunari Regiment "Serenissima", in Mestre (Veneto)
    - Lagunari Battalion, in Venice-Malcontenta (Veneto) with VTLM Lince vehicles
    - Amphibious Tactical Support Company, on Vignole Island (Veneto) with AAV7-A1 amphibious assault vehicles
  - Field Artillery Regiment "a Cavallo" (Horse Artillery), in Vercelli (Piedmont)
    - 1st Howitzer Group, in Vercelli (Piedmont) with FH-70 towed howitzers
    - 2nd Horse Group, in Milan (Lombardy) with ceremonial 75/27 Mod. 1912 horse-drawn guns
  - 3rd Engineer Regiment, in Udine (Friuli-Venezia Giulia)
  - Logistic Regiment "Pozzuolo del Friuli", in Remanzacco (Friuli-Venezia Giulia)

The brigade forms with the Italian navy's 3rd Naval Division, and San Marco Marine Brigade the Italian military's National Sea Projection Capability (Forza di proiezione dal mare).

====== Mechanized Brigade "Sassari" ======
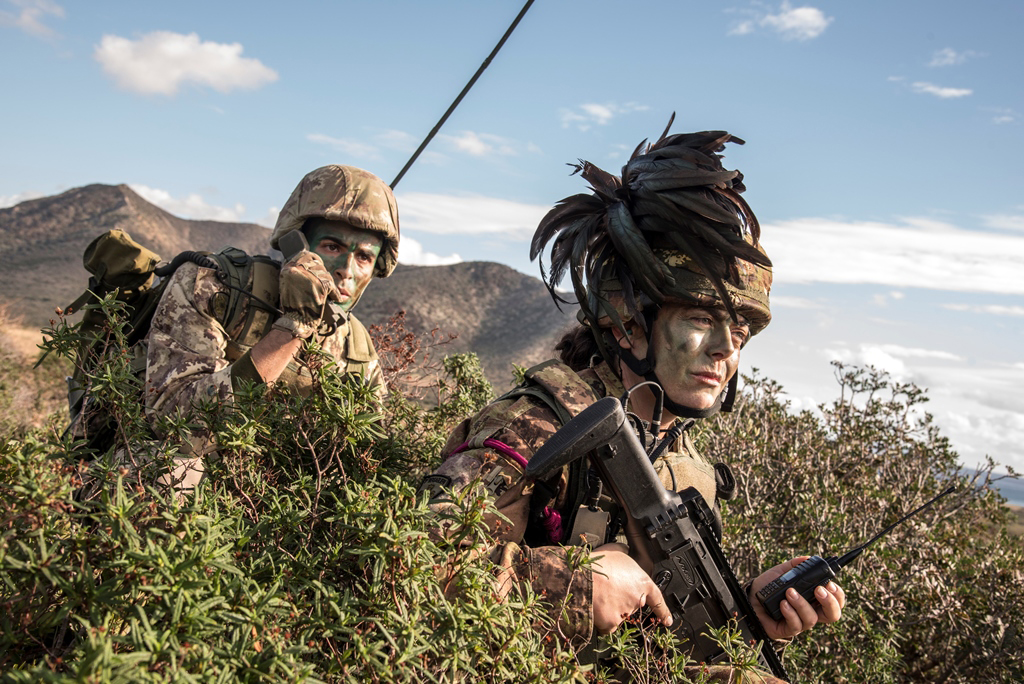
3rd Bersaglieri Regiment lieutenant with her radioman during an exercise in Sardinia

- Mechanized Brigade "Sassari", in Sassari (Sardinia)
  - 45th Command and Tactical Supports Unit "Reggio", in Sassari (Sardinia)
  - 3rd Bersaglieri Regiment, in Capo Teulada (Sardinia) with Freccia infantry fighting vehicles
  - 151st Infantry Regiment "Sassari", in Cagliari (Sardinia) with VTLM Lince vehicles (upgrade to Freccia infantry fighting vehicles planned)
  - 152nd Infantry Regiment "Sassari", in Sassari (Sardinia) with VTLM Lince vehicles (upgrade to Freccia infantry fighting vehicles planned)
  - 5th Engineer Regiment, in Macomer (Sardinia)
  - Logistic Regiment "Sassari", in Cagliari (Sardinia)

===== Division "Acqui" =====
The Division "Acqui" is a deployable division command headquartered in Capua near Naples. The division is commanded by a two-star general (OF-7).

- Division "Acqui", in Capua (Campania)
  - 57th Command and Tactical Supports Unit "Abruzzi", in Capua (Campania)

====== Mechanized Brigade "Granatieri di Sardegna" ======
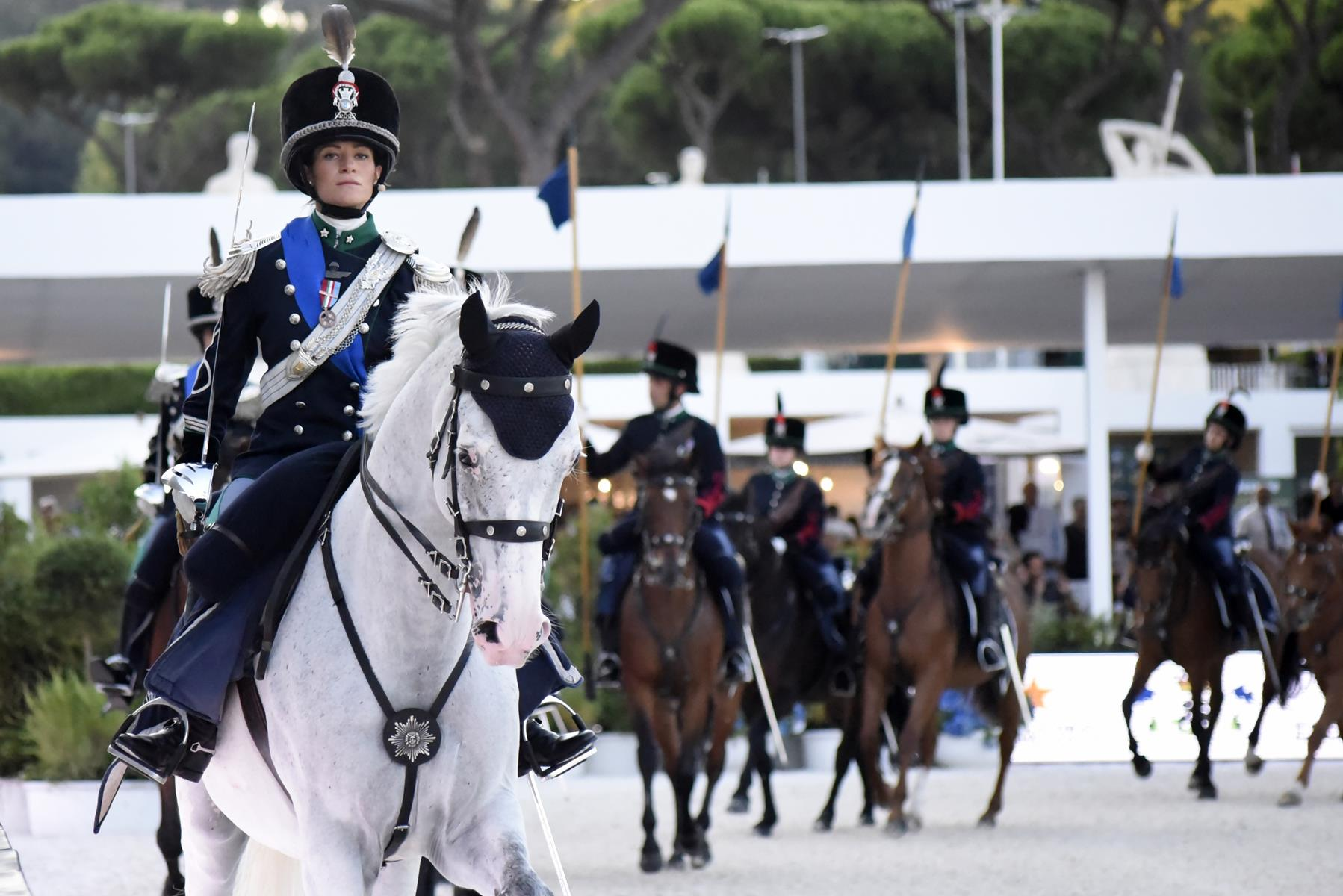
Regiment “Lancieri di Montebello” (8th) on public duties

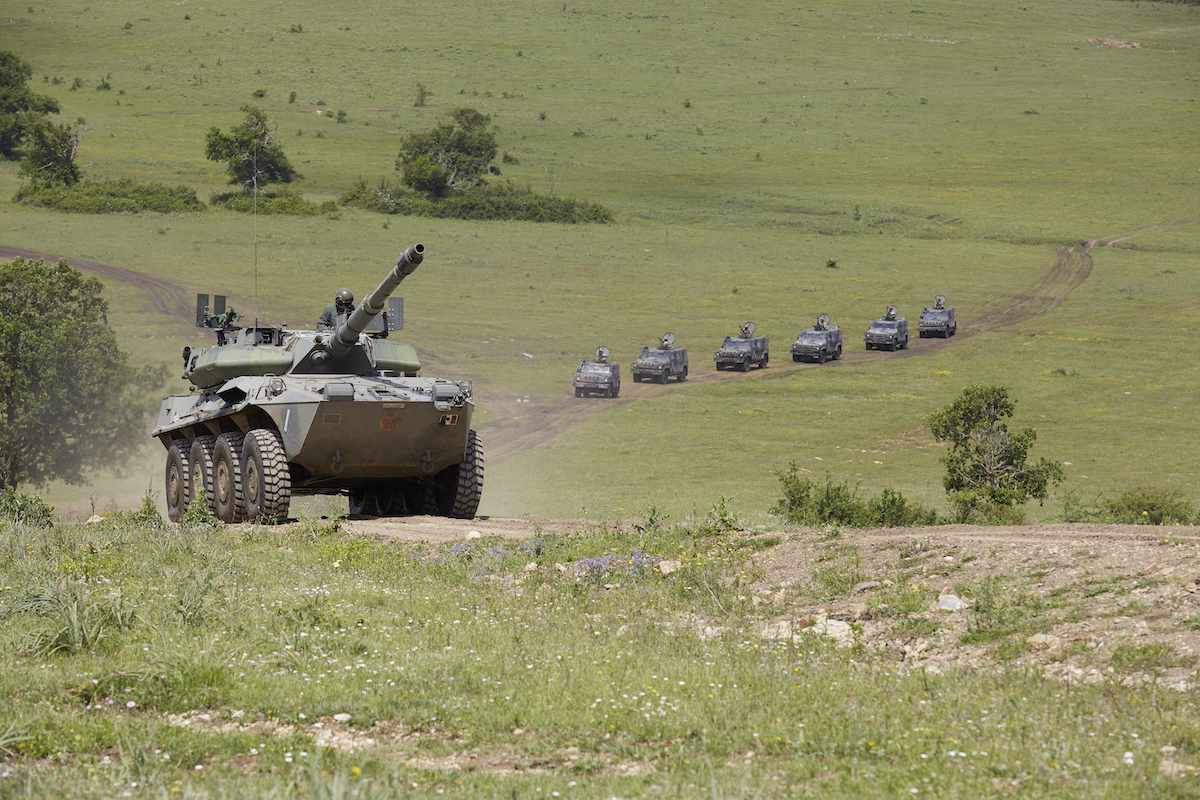
Regiment "Lancieri di Montebello" (8th) on exercise

- Mechanized Brigade "Granatieri di Sardegna", in Rome (Lazio)
  - 3rd Granatieri Command and Tactical Supports Unit "Guardie", in Rome (Lazio)
  - Regiment "Lancieri di Montebello" (8th), in Rome (Lazio)
    - Armored Squadrons Group, in Rome (Lazio) with Centauro tank destroyers
    - Horse Squadrons Group tasked with public duties, in Rome (Lazio)
  - 1st Regiment "Granatieri di Sardegna", in Rome (Lazio) with Dardo infantry fighting vehicles
  - 2nd Regiment "Granatieri di Sardegna", in Spoleto (Umbria) with VTLM Lince vehicles

====== Mechanized Brigade "Aosta" ======
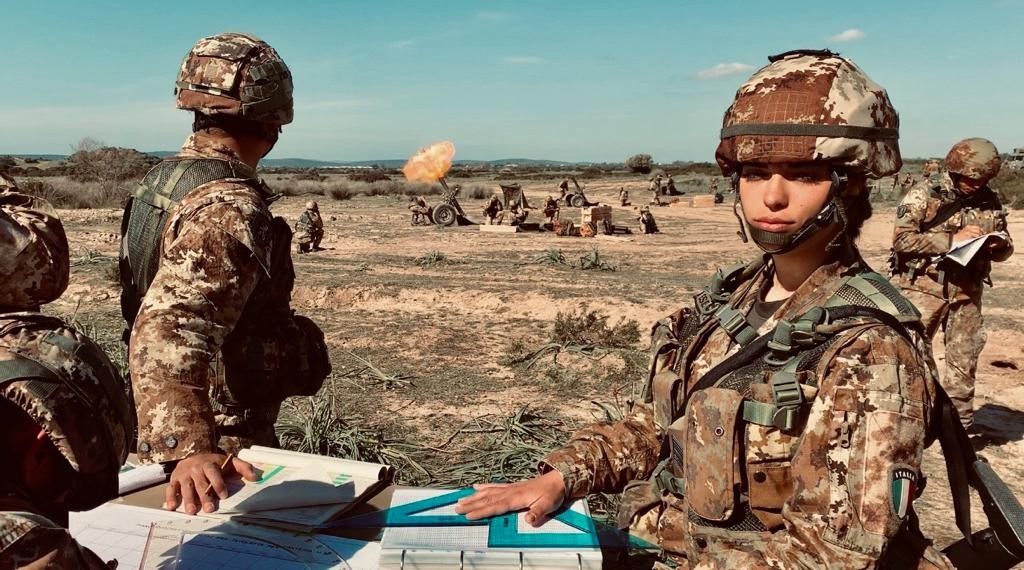
Mechanized Brigade Aosta mortar teams

- Mechanized Brigade "Aosta", in Messina (Sicily)
  - 6th Command and Tactical Supports Unit "Aosta", in Messina (Sicily)
  - Regiment "Lancieri di Aosta" (6th), in Palermo (Sicily) with Centauro 2 tank destroyers
  - 6th Bersaglieri Regiment, in Trapani (Sicily) with Freccia infantry fighting vehicles
  - 5th Infantry Regiment "Aosta", in Messina (Sicily) with Freccia infantry fighting vehicles
  - 62nd Infantry Regiment "Sicilia", in Catania (Sicily) Freccia infantry fighting vehicles
  - 24th Field Artillery Regiment "Peloritani", in Messina (Sicily) with FH-70 towed howitzers
  - 4th Engineer Regiment, in Palermo (Sicily)
  - Logistic Regiment "Aosta", in Palermo (Sicily)

====== Mechanized Brigade "Pinerolo" ======
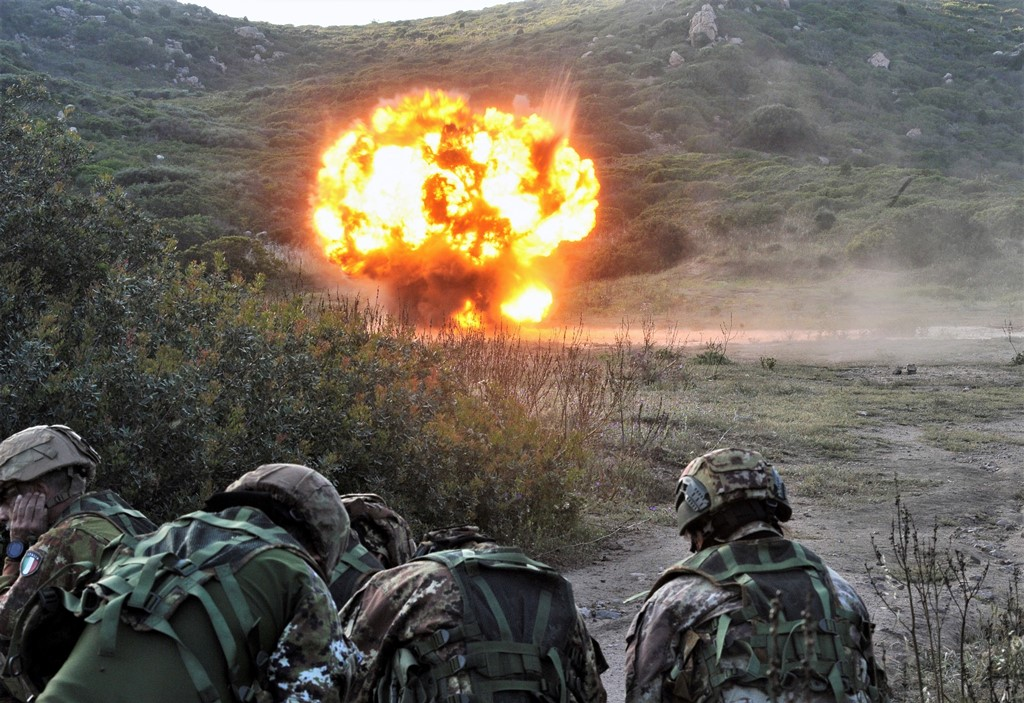
11th Engineer Regiment during an exercise

- Mechanized Brigade "Pinerolo", in Bari (Apulia)
  - 13th Command and Tactical Supports Unit "Pinerolo", in Bari (Apulia)
  - Regiment "Cavalleggeri di Lodi" (15th), in Lecce (Apulia) with Centauro 2 tank destroyers
  - 7th Bersaglieri Regiment, in Altamura (Apulia) with Freccia infantry fighting vehicles
  - 9th Infantry Regiment "Bari", in Trani (Apulia) with Freccia infantry fighting vehicles
  - 82nd Infantry Regiment "Torino", in Barletta (Apulia) with Freccia infantry fighting vehicles
  - 21st Field Artillery Regiment "Trieste", in Foggia (Apulia) with FH-70 towed howitzers
  - 11th Engineer Regiment, in Foggia (Apulia)
  - Logistic Regiment "Pinerolo", in Bari (Apulia)

====== Bersaglieri Brigade "Garibaldi" ======
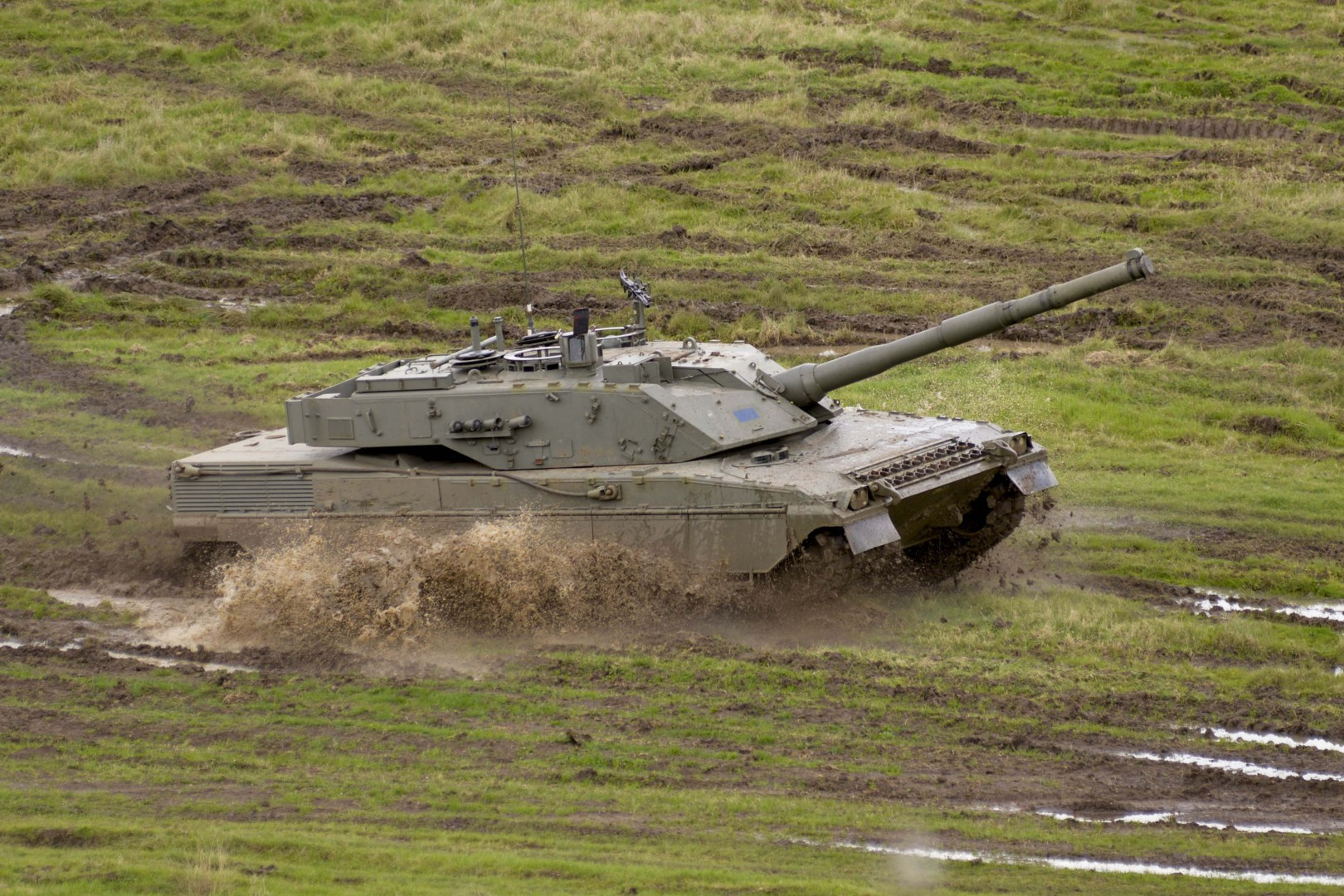
4th Tank Regiment Ariete main battle tank

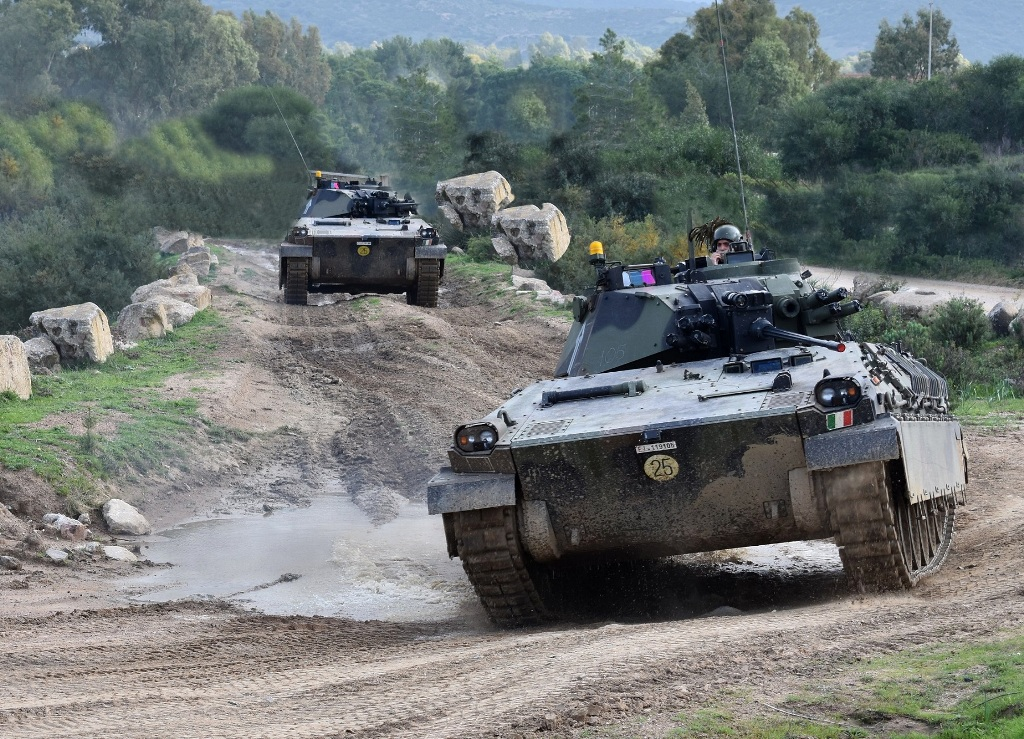
1st Bersaglieri Regiment Dardo IFVs

- Bersaglieri Brigade "Garibaldi", in Caserta (Campania)
  - 4th Bersaglieri Command and Tactical Supports Unit, in Caserta (Campania)
  - Regiment "Cavalleggeri Guide" (19th), in Salerno (Campania) with Centauro tank destroyers
  - 4th Tank Regiment, in Persano (Campania) with Ariete main battle tanks
  - 1st Bersaglieri Regiment, in Cosenza (Calabria) with Dardo infantry fighting vehicles
  - 8th Bersaglieri Regiment, in Caserta (Campania) with Dardo infantry fighting vehicles
  - 8th Field Artillery Regiment "Pasubio", in Persano (Campania) with PzH 2000 self-propelled howitzers
  - 21st Engineer Regiment, in Caserta (Campania)
  - Logistic Regiment "Garibaldi", in Persano (Campania)

=== Army National Territorial Command ===
The Army National Territorial Command (Italian: Comando Territoriale Nazionale dell'Esercito, abbreviation: COMTER) in Rome is responsible for the army's territorial functions, which include inter alia public duties, recruitment, administration of the reserves, public information, promotional activities, and the maintenance of the army's bases and infrastructure. The command is commanded by a three-star general (OF-8).

- Army National Territorial Command, in Rome (Lazio) - the command includes the Army Military Command "Lazio", which covers the Lazio region
  - Northern Territorial Command (COMTER Nord), in Padua (Veneto) - the command includes the Army Military Command "Veneto", which covers the Veneto region
    - Army Military Command "Emilia Romagna", in Bologna, covering the Emilia-Romagna region
    - Army Military Command "Friuli-Venezia Giulia", in Trieste, covering the Friuli-Venezia Giulia region
    - Army Military Command "Liguria", in Genoa, covering the Liguria region
    - Army Military Command "Lombardia", in Milan, covering the Lombardy region
    - Army Military Command "Piemonte", in Turin, covering the Piedmont and Aosta regions
    - Army Military Command "Toscana", in Florence, covering the Tuscany region
    - Army Military Command "Trentino-Alto Adige", in Trento, covering the Trentino-Alto Adige/Südtirol region
  - Southern Territorial Command (COMTER Sud), in Naples (Campania) - the command includes the Army Military Command "Campania", which covers the Campania region
    - Army Military Command "Abruzzo e Molise", in L'Aquila, covering the Abruzzo and Molise regions
    - Army Military Command "Basilicata", in Potenza, covering the Basilicata region
    - Army Military Command "Calabria", in Catanzaro, covering the Calabria region
    - Army Military Command "Marche", in Ancona, covering the Marche region
    - Army Military Command "Puglia", in Bari, covering the Apulia region
    - Army Military Command "Sardegna", in Cagliari, covering the island of Sardinia
    - Army Military Command "Sicilia", in Palermo, covering the island of Sicily
    - Army Military Command "Umbria", in Perugia, covering the Umbria region
  - Infrastructure Command, in Cecchignola (Lazio)
    - 1st Infrastructure Department, in Turin (Piedmont)
      - 3rd Infrastructure Department, in Milan (Lombardy)
      - 4th Infrastructure Department, in Bolzano (South Tyrol)
    - 5th Infrastructure Department, in Padua (Veneto)
      - 12th Infrastructure Department, in Udine (Friuli-Venezia Giulia)
    - 7th Infrastructure Department, in Florence (Tuscany)
      - 6th Infrastructure Department, in Bologna (Emilia-Romagna)
    - 8th Infrastructure Department, in Rome (Lazio)
      - 14th Infrastructure Department, in Cagliari (Sardinia)
    - 10th Infrastructure Department, in Naples (Campania)
      - 11th Infrastructure Department, in Palermo (Sicily)
    - 15th Infrastructure Department, in Bari (Apulia)
      - 13th Infrastructure Department, in Pescara (Abruzzo)
    - Operational Infrastructure Engineer Unit, in Cecchignola (Lazio)
  - Central Logistic Grouping
    - Command Unit, in Rome (Lazio) providing security and support to the Army General Staff
    - 11th Transport Regiment "Flaminia", in Rome (Lazio) providing transport for the Defense General Staff
  - Training Logistics Bases:
    - Training Logistics Base Bardonecchia, in Bardonecchia
    - Training Logistics Base Cà Vio, in Cavallino-Treporti
    - Training Logistics Base Camigliatello Silano, in Celico
    - Training Logistics Base Cecina, in Cecina
    - Training Logistics Base Cefalù, in Cefalù
    - Training Logistics Base Colle Isarco, in Gossensass
    - Training Logistics Base Edolo, in Edolo
    - Training Logistics Base Milano Marittima, in Cervia
    - Training Logistics Base Muggia, in Muggia
    - Training Logistics Base Palau, in Palau
    - Training Logistics Base Riva del Garda, in Riva del Garda
    - Training Logistics Base Roccaraso, in Roccaraso
    - Training Logistics Base San Cataldo, in Lecce
    - Training Logistics Base Sanremo, in Sanremo
    - Training Logistics Base Tarvisio, in Tarvisio
    - Training Logistics Base Valle Carene, in Portoferraio
  - Military Penitentiary Organization Command, in Santa Maria Capua Vetere (Campania)
  - Military Spa and Heliotherapy Establishment - Ischia, in Ischia
  - Army Music Band, in Rome (Lazio)
  - Bersaglieri History Museum, in Rome (Lazio)
  - Archive Management Center, in Candiolo (Piedmont)
  - Document Office, in Rome (Lazio)

=== Army Logistic Command ===
The Army Logistic Command (Italian: Comando Logistico dell'Esercito, abbreviation: COMLOG) in Rome manages the army's logistics. The command is commanded by a three-star general (OF-8).

- Army Logistic Command, in Rome (Lazio)
  - Military Polyclinic "Celio", in Rome
    - Long-term Care Center, Anzio (Lazio)
  - Central Inspection Unit, in Rome
  - Technical Command, in Rome
    - Multifunctional Experimentation Center, in Montelibretti (Lazio)
    - Joint Forces Technical-Logistical CBRN Center, in Civitavecchia (Lazio)

==== Commissary Command ====
- Commissary Command, in Rome
  - Commissary School, in Maddaloni (Campania)
    - Training and Support Battalion, in Maddaloni (Campania)
    - Mobile Field Vehicles Battalion, in Maddaloni (Campania)
  - Army National Administrative Center, in Rome
  - Commissary Supply Center, in Rome
  - Commissary Supply Center, in Verona (Veneto)
  - Commissary Supply Center, in Palermo (Sicily)
  - Commissary Supply Detached Section, in Cagliari (Sardinia)

==== Materiel and Transport Command ====
- Materiel and Transport Command, in Rome
  - Transport and Materiel School, in Rome (Lazio)
  - Heavy Maintenance Hub North (POLMANT NORD), in Piacenza (Emilia-Romagna)
    - 3rd Maintenance and Supply Center, in Milan (Lombardy)
      - Ammunition and explosives depots in Gossolengo, Remondò, Chiesuole/Noceto, Buscoldo, Ome, Serle, and Goito
    - 15th Maintenance and Supply Center, in Padua (Veneto)
      - Ammunition and explosives depots in Valeggio sul Mincio, Orgiano, Arzene, Spilimbergo, San Vito al Tagliamento, Morsano al Tagliamento, and Teor
    - Maintenance and Supply Section, in Treviso (Veneto)
    - High Capacity Fuel and Lubricant Storage, in Giavera del Montello (Veneto)
  - Heavy Maintenance Hub South (POLMANT SUD), in Nola (Campania)
    - 10th Maintenance and Supply Center, in Naples (Campania)
      - Ammunition and explosives depots in Cecina, Montepescali, Rapolano, Nera Montoro, Pratola Peligna, San Tammaro, and Poggiorsini
    - Maintenance and Supply Section, in Cagliari (Sardinia)
      - Ammunition and explosives depot in Siliqua
    - Maintenance and Supply Section, in Palermo (Sicily)
      - Ammunition and explosives depot in Corleone
  - Light Weapons Maintenance Hub (PMAL), in Terni (Umbria)
  - Telecommunications, Electronics and Optoelectronics Materiel Maintenance Hub (POLMANTEO), in Rome
    - 44th TLC Support Battalion "Penne", in Rome
    - 184th TLC Support Battalion "Cansiglio", in Treviso (Veneto)
  - Engineer, Artillery and CBRN Motorization Supply Hub, in Peschiera del Garda (Veneto)
  - Engineer, Artillery and CBRN Motorization Materiel Park, in Montorio Veronese (Veneto)
  - Tracked and Armored Vehicles Park, in Lenta (Piedmont)
  - 8th Transport Regiment "Casilina", in Rome

==== Medical and Veterinary Command ====
- Medical and Veterinary Command, in Rome
  - Medical and Veterinary School, in Rome-Cecchignola (Lazio)
    - Training Battalion, in Rome-Cecchignola (Lazio)
  - Military Hospital Center, in Milan (Lombardy)
  - Military Medical Center, in Padua (Veneto)
  - Military Medical Center, in Rome (Lazio)
  - Military Medical Center, in Cagliari (Sardinia)
  - Military Medical Center, in Messina (Sicily)
  - Military Veterinary Center, in Grosseto (Tuscany)
    - Military Working Dogs Group, in Grosseto (Tuscany)
    - Equestrian Department, in Montelibretti (Lazio)
  - Joint Forces Medical Commission, in Rome
  - Northern Infirmary, in Turin (Piedmont)
    - Infirmary, in Bolzano (South Tyrol)
    - Infirmary, in Milan (Lombardy)
    - Infirmary, in Padua (Veneto)
    - Infirmary, in Udine (Friuli-Venezia Giulia)
  - Central Infirmary, in Florence (Tuscany)
    - Infirmary, in Modena (Emilia-Romagna)
    - Infirmary, in Rome (Lazio)
    - Infirmary, in Viterbo (Lazio)
  - Southern Infirmary, in Bari (Apulia)
    - Infirmary, in Cagliari (Sardinia)
    - Infirmary, in Caserta (Campania)
    - Infirmary, in Messina (Sicily)
    - Infirmary, in Palermo (Sicily)

==== Logistic Support Command ====
The Logistic Support Command in Rome trains officers and troops destined for logistic units and provides operational logistic support with two specialized logistic regiments and four medical battalions. The command is commanded by a one-star general (OF-6).

- Logistic Support Command, in Rome (Lazio)
  - Transit Areas Management Regiment – RSOM (Reception Staging and Onward Movement), in Bellinzago Novarese (Lombardy), managing the deployment of forces for out-of-area operations
    - Logistic Battalion, Bellinzago Novarese (Lombardy)
    - Transit Areas Management Battalion, in Bellinzago Novarese (Lombardy)
    - Logistic Battalion, in Bari (Apulia)
    - Transit Areas Management Battalion, in Bari (Apulia)
  - 6th General Support Logistic Regiment, in Budrio (Emilia-Romagna)
    - Transport Battalion, in Budrio (Emilia-Romagna)
    - Movement Control Battalion, in Budrio (Emilia-Romagna)
  - 1st Medical Unit "Torino", in Turin (Piedmont)
  - 3rd Medical Unit "Milano", in Bellinzago Novarese (Lombardy)
  - 4th Medical Unit "Bolzano", in Rome (Lazio)
  - 10th Medical Unit "Napoli", in Persano (Campania)

Each medical unit fields one command and logistic support company, one medical company with a field hospital, and one medical evacuations company.

=== Army Training, Specialization and Doctrine Command ===
The Army Training, Specialization and Doctrine Command (Italian: Comando per la Formazione, Specializzazione e Dottrina dell'Esercito, abbreviation: COMFORDOT) in Rome trains the army's troops and develops the army's doctrine and education policies. The command is commanded by a three-star general (OF-8).

- Army Training, Specialization and Doctrine Command, in Rome (Lazio)
  - Army Officers School, in Turin (Piedmont) (Military University)
  - Military Academy, in Modena
    - Military School Nunziatella, in Naples (High School)
    - Military School Teulié, in Milan (High School)
  - Army Non-Commissioned Officers School, in Viterbo (Lazio)
  - Infantry School, in Cesano (Lazio)
    - Training Regiment, in Cesano (Lazio) training non-commissioned officers of the Infantry Corps
      - Command Unit "M.O. Mattei"
      - 1st Training Battalion "M.O. Vannucci"
      - 2nd Training Battalion "M.O. Fasil"
    - 17th Volunteer Training Regiment "Acqui", in Capua (Campania)
    - 85th Volunteer Training Regiment "Verona", in Verona (Veneto)
    - 235th Volunteer Training Regiment "Piceno", in Ascoli Piceno (Marche)
    - Infantry History Museum, in Rome (Lazio)
  - Cavalry School, in Lecce (Apulia)
    - Command and Logistic Support Unit
    - Training Regiment, in Lecce (Apulia) training non-commissioned officers of the Cavalry Corps
      - Training Squadrons Group
  - Joint Forces CBRN-Defense School, in Rieti (Lazio)
  - Army Language School, in Perugia
  - Army National Selection and Recruitment Center, in Foligno (Umbria)
    - Army Selection Center, in Milan (Lombardy)
    - Army Selection Center, in Rome (Lazio)
    - Army Selection Center, in Naples (Campania)
    - Army Selection Center, in Palermo (Sicily)
  - Post Conflict Operations Studies Center, in Turin (Piedmont)

== Army Structure - Visual overview ==
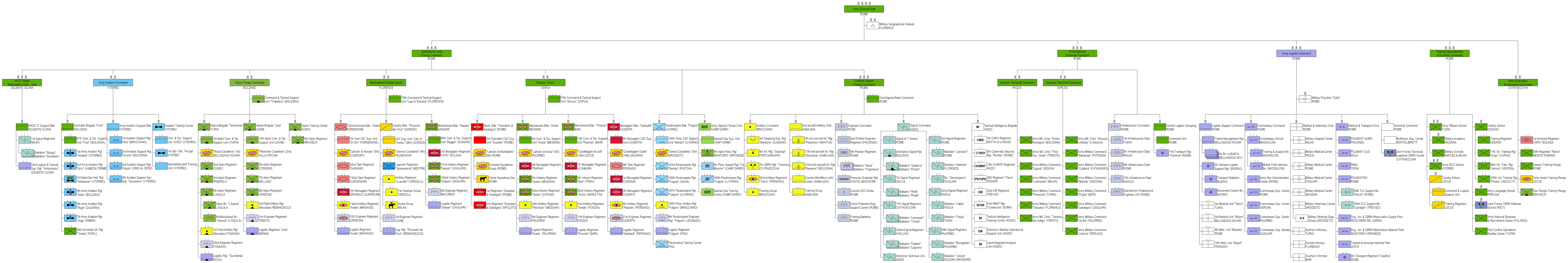
Structure of the Italian Army as of 1 October 2025 (click to enlarge).

== Army Geographical Distribution ==
Unit Locations (Signal units not included)
#1: 132nd Field Artillery Regiment "Ariete", Logistic Regiment "Ariete"
#2: 32nd Tank Regiment
#3: 11th Bersaglieri Regiment, 5th Army Aviation Regiment "Rigel", Regiment "Lancieri di Novara" (5th), 5th Field Artillery Regiment "Superga"
#4: 3rd Engineer Regiment Logistic Regiment "Pozzuolo del Friuli"
#5: 6th Pioneer Regiment 9th Cybernetic Security Regiment "Rombo"

== See also ==
- Italian Army
- List of units of the Italian Army
- Structure of the Italian Air Force
