= 51st Engineer Battalion "Simeto" =

Italian Army engineer unit

- 51° Battaglione Genio Pionieri "Simeto"
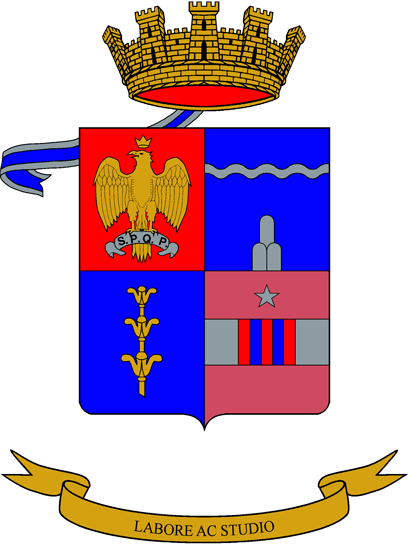
- Battalion coat of arms
- Active: 22 May 1916 — 1 March 1918; 15 July 1935 — 13 May 1943; 13 Nov. 1943 — 1 Oct. 1975; 1 Jan. 1983 — 19 Sept. 1992
- Country: Italy
- Branch: Italian Army
- Role: Combat engineers
- Part of: Sicily Military Region
- Garrison/HQ: Palermo
- Motto: "Labore ac studio"
- Anniversaries: 24 June 1918 - Second Battle of the Piave River
- Engagements: World War I World War II
- Decorations: 1× Silver Medal of Military Valor

Insignia
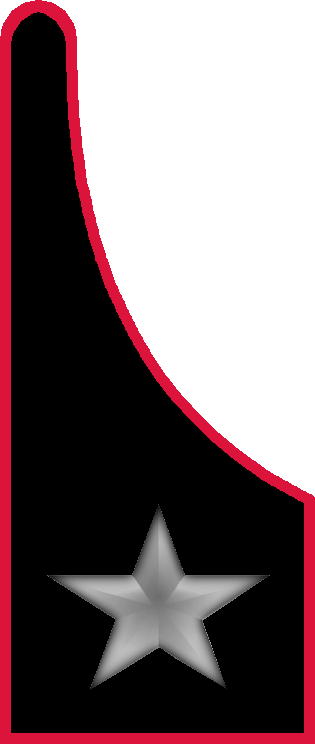
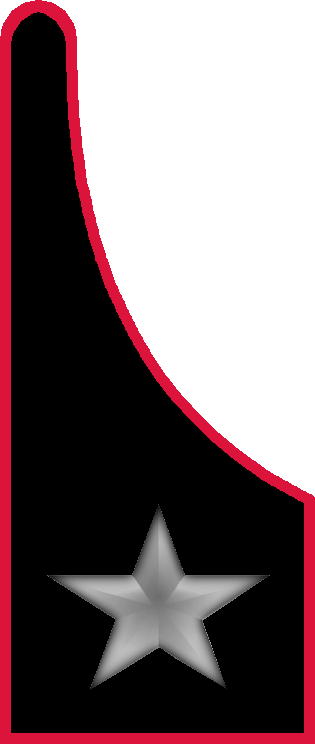
- Engineers gorget patches

The 51st Engineer Battalion "Simeto" (Italian: 51° Battaglione Genio Pionieri "Simeto") is a military engineering unit of the Italian Army last based in Palermo in Sicily. During the later half of World War I the Royal Italian Army's 2nd Engineer Regiment (Sappers) formed an engineer battalion with the number LI, which served on the Italian Front. In 1935, in preparation for the Second Italo-Ethiopian War, the 4th Engineer Regiment formed an engineer battalion, which received the same number. After the annexation of Ethiopia the battalion remained active and served in the Western Desert campaign and Tunisian campaign of World War II. In 1943, the Italian Co-belligerent Army formed an engineer battalion with the number LI, which was initially assigned to the I Motorized Grouping, then the Italian Liberation Corps, and finally the Combat Group "Legnano". The battalion fought on the allied side in the war's Italian campaign.

After the war the battalion was assigned to the Infantry Division "Legnano". In 1946, the battalion split to form the Engineer Battalion "Legnano" and Signal Battalion "Legnano". In 1975, the Engineer Battalion "Legnano" was disbanded. In 1983, the 51st Engineer Battalion was reformed in Sicily and named for the Simeto river. In 1992, the battalion lost its autonomy and entered the reformed 4th Engineer Regiment. The battalion's anniversary falls, as for all engineer units, on 24 June 1918, the last day of the Second Battle of the Piave River.

== History ==
=== World War I ===
On 22 May 1916, the depot of the 2nd Engineer Regiment (Sappers) in Casale Monferrato formed the LI Sappers Battalion. The battalion consisted of a command, and the 104th, 134th, and 156th sappers companies. The battalion served on the Asiago Plateau until it was disbanded on 1 March 1918.

=== World War II ===
On 15 July 1935, the depot of the 4th Engineer Regiment in Trento formed the LI Mixed Engineer Battalion for the 32nd Motorized Division "Trento". From December 1935 to August 1936, the division deployed to Libya to replace units deployed to East Africa for the Second Italo-Ethiopian War. After the return from Libya, the battalion remained assigned to the "Trento" division, which in 1939 was renamed 102nd Motorized Division "Trento". In March 1941, the "Trento" division was shipped to Libya for the Western Desert campaign. In November 1942, the "Trento" division was destroyed during the Second Battle of El Alamein. In the same battle the LI Mixed Engineer Battalion suffered heavy losses and was filled up with survivors of other destroyed engineer units. The battalion then fought in the Tunisian campaign, during which it was attached initially to the 27th Infantry Division "Brescia" and then the 16th Motorized Division "Pistoia". On 13 May 1943, the battalion surrendered to the allies and was declared lost due to wartime events.

On 13 November 1943, the Italian Co-belligerent Army reformed the LI Mixed Engineer Battalion in Colli a Volturno. The reformed battalion consisted of a command, the 51st Teleradio Company, and the 51st Engineer Company, which had been formed on 27 September 1943 in San Pietro Vernotico. Initially the battalion served with the I Motorized Grouping, which fought on the allied side in the Italian campaign. On 22 March 1944, the battalion joined the newly formed Italian Liberation Corps. On 30 September 1944, the battalion was assigned to the newly formed Combat Group "Legnano". After joining the combat group the battalion was augmented with the 3rd Engineer Company. For its service during the Italian campaign the battalion was awarded a Silver Medal of Military Valor.

=== Cold War ===
After the end of the war the battalion was based in Bergamo and remained assigned to the Combat Group "Legnano". On 15 October 1945, the combat group was reorganized as Infantry Division "Legnano". At the time, the LI Mixed Engineer Battalion consisted of a command, the 3rd and 51st engineer companies, the 51st Teleradio Company, and the 3rd Field Park Company. On 1 December 1946, the battalion split to form the Engineer Battalion "Legnano" in Pavia and the Connections Battalion "Legnano" in Bergamo. As part of the split the battalion formed a command platoon and consisted afterwards of a command, a command platoon, the 3rd Engineer Company, the 51st Engineer Company, and the 3rd Field Park Company.

On 8 April 1947, the battalion's companies were renumbered as 1st Engineer Company, 2nd Engineer Company, and 3rd Field Park Company. On 1 October 1956, the battalion formed the 3rd Engineer Company, followed in August 1966 by the 4th Engineer Company. In 1968, the battalion moved from Pavia to Verona. On 1 October 1975, the Infantry Division "Legnano" was split to form the Mechanized Brigade "Legnano" and Mechanized Brigade "Brescia". On the same day, the Engineer Battalion "Legnano" was disbanded and its personnel and materiel used to form the Engineer Company "Legnano" and Engineer Company "Brescia", which were assigned to the two new brigades.

On 1 January 1983, the 51st Engineer Battalion "Simeto" was formed in Palermo. Since the 1975 army reform engineer battalions were named for a lake, if they supported an corps-level command, or a river, if they supported a division or brigade. As the 51st Engineer Battalion "Simeto" supported the division-level Sicily Military Region, the battalion was named for the Simeto river in Sicily, along which Royal Italian Army units fought British Army paratroopers for control of the Primosole bridge during Operation Fustian. On 5 March 1983, the President of the Italian Republic Sandro Pertini granted with decree 218 the battalion a flag. With the flag the battalion also received the traditions of all preceding engineer units numbered 51, as well as the traditions of the Engineer Battalion "Legnano" and the 12th Engineer Regiment, which had been based in Palermo from 1 October 1922 to July 1943, and whose motto the "Simeto" battalion inherited. The 51st Engineer Battalion "Simeto" consisted of a command, a command and services company, the 1st Engineer Company, and the Engineer Park Company. On 11 December 1985, the battalion formed the 2nd Engineer Company.

=== Recent times ===
After the Cold War the Italian Army began a reorganization of its forces: on 19 September 1992, the 51st Engineer Battalion "Simeto" in Palermo lost its autonomy and the next day the battalion entered the reformed 4th Pioneer Regiment as Pioneer Battalion "Simeto". As the flag of the 4th Engineer Regiment was still assigned to the 4th Engineer Battalion "Orta" in Trento, the reformed regiment continued to use temporarily the flag of the "Simeto" battalion. On 3 October 1993, 4th Engineer Battalion "Orta" lost its autonomy and the next day the battalion entered the reformed 1st Pioneer Regiment as Pioneer Battalion "Orta". As the flag of the 1st Engineer Regiment was still stored at the Shrine of the Flags in the Vittoriano in Rome, the 1st Pioneer Regiment continued to use temporarily the flag of the 4th Engineer Regiment.

On 13 October 1995, the 2nd Engineer Battalion "Iseo" in Bolzano was disbanded. On the same day, the flag of the 2nd Engineer Regiment, which had been assigned in 1975 to the 2nd Miners Battalion "Iseo", was transferred from Bolzano to Trento, where, upon the arrival of the flag, the 1st Pioneer Regiment was renamed 2nd Engineer Regiment, while the regiment's Pioneer Battalion "Orta" was renamed Sappers Battalion "Iseo". Afterwards, the flag of the 4th Engineer Regiment was transferred from Trento to Palermo, where it arrived and was assigned to the 4th Pioneer Regiment on 24 October 1995. Subsequently, the flag of the 51st Engineer Battalion "Simeto" was transferred to the Shrine of the Flags in the Vittoriano in Rome for safekeeping.
