= 2nd Engineer Regiment (Italy) =

Active Italian Army combat engineer unit

- 2° Reggimento Genio Guastatori
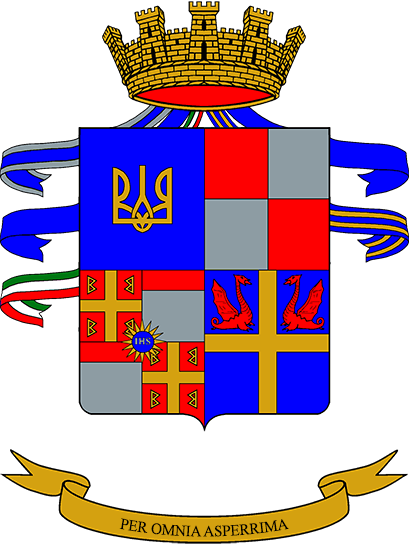
- Regimental coat of arms
- Active: 2 May 1860 – 25 Aug. 1867; 1 Jan. 1874 – 31 March 1920; 11 Oct. 1926 – 8 Sept. 1943; 20 April 1954 – today
- Country: Italy
- Branch: Italian Army
- Role: Combat engineers
- Part of: Alpine Brigade "Julia"
- Garrison/HQ: Trento
- Motto: "Per omnia asperrima"
- Anniversaries: 24 June 1918 – Second Battle of the Piave River
- Decorations: 1× Silver Medal of Military Valor; 2× Bronze Medals of Military Valor; 1× Bronze Medal of Army Valor; 1× Silver Medal of Civil Valor; 2× Silver Cross of Army Merit

Insignia
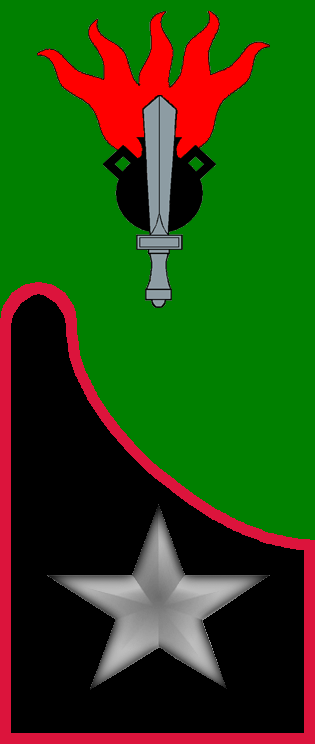
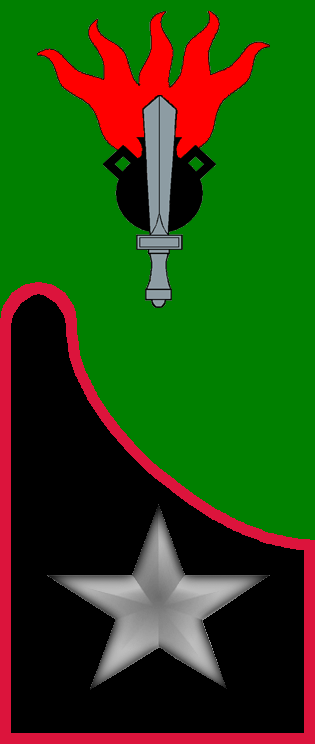
- Alpine sappers gorget patches

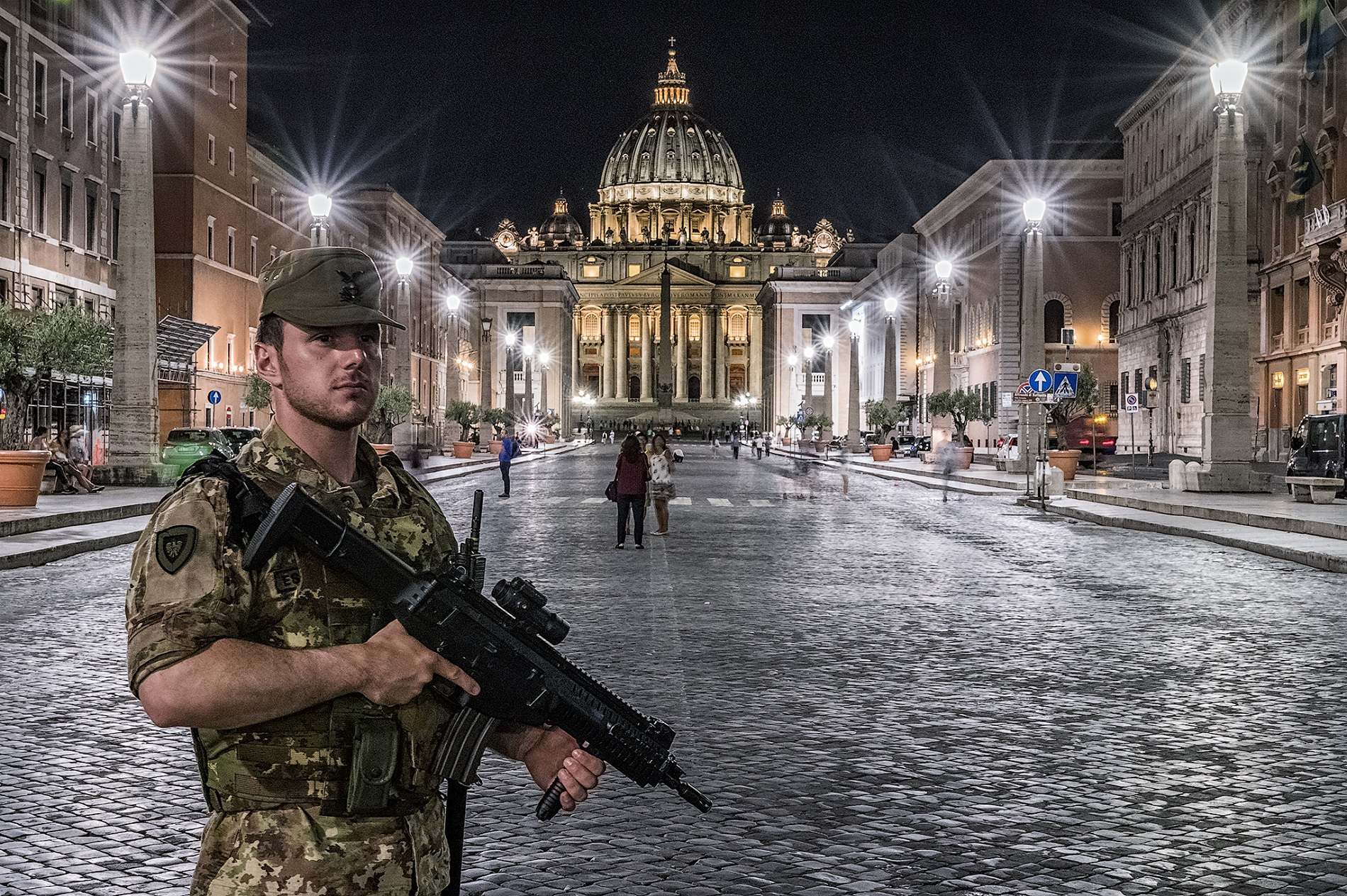
A soldier from the 2nd Engineer Regiment patrolling the Via della Conciliazione in Rome

The 2nd Engineer Regiment (Italian: 2° Reggimento Genio Guastatori) is a military engineering regiment of the Italian Army based in Trento in Trentino. The regiment was formed in 1860 and is currently the oldest active engineer regiment of the Italian Army. Since 1954, the unit has been assigned of the 4th Alpine Army Corps and has therefore a strong association with the Italian Army's mountain infantry speciality, the Alpini, with whom the regiment shares the distinctive Cappello Alpino. The regiment is the engineer unit of the Alpine Brigade "Julia" and specializes in mountain combat.

In 1860, the Royal Sardinian Army split the Sappers Regiment into the 1st Sappers Regiment and 2nd Sappers Regiment, which were both tasked with training sappers units. During the same year the regiment's companies fought in the Sardinian campaign in central and southern Italy and in 1866 in the Third Italian War of Independence. In 1867, the two sappers regiments were merged into the Sappers Corps, which, in 1874, was disbanded so the two regiments could be reformed. The 2nd Engineer Regiment provided personnel for First Italo-Ethiopian War and two sappers battalions for the Italo-Turkish War. During World War I the regiment's battalions and companies fought in all sectors of the Italian Front, and on the Albanian Front, and Western Front. In 1920, the regiment was disbanded. In 1922, the Royal Italian Army formed the 1st Army Corps Engineer Grouping, which in October 1926 was renamed 2nd Engineer Regiment. During the Second Italo-Ethiopian War and World War II the regiment's depot formed engineer battalions and smaller units, which deployed with divisions and corps to the fronts of the war. After the announcement of the Armistice of Cassibile on 8 September 1943 the regiment was disbanded by invading German forces.

In 1954, the unit was reformed as 2nd Engineer Grouping and assigned to the IV Army Corps. In 1955, the grouping was renamed 2nd Engineer Regiment. In 1975, the regiment was disbanded and the regiment's II Miners Battalion became an autonomous unit, which was renamed 2nd Miners Battalion "Iseo". After the regiment was disbanded, the flag and traditions of the 2nd Engineer Regiment were transferred to the 2nd Miners Battalion "Iseo", which also received the traditions of the 2nd Miners Regiment. The battalion was based in Bolzano and assigned to the 4th Alpine Army Corps's Engineer Command. In 1995, the 2nd Engineer Regiment was reformed by renaming the 1st Pioneer Regiment in Trento, whose battalion was renamed Sappers Battalion "Iseo". In 2002, the regiment was transferred from the Alpine Troops Command to the Alpine Brigade "Julia". The regiment's anniversary falls, as for all engineer units, on 24 June 1918, the last day of the Second Battle of the Piave River.

== History ==
=== Italian Wars of Independence ===
On 29 September 1848, during the First Italian War of Independence, the Royal Sardinian Army formed a Sappers Regiment in Alessandria, which consisted of a staff and two battalions, each of which fielded four sappers companies and one miners company. In May 1859, during the Second Italian War of Independence, Sardinian forces occupied the Grand Duchy of Tuscany, the Duchy of Parma and Piacenza, the Duchy of Modena and Reggio, and the Papal Legations of the Romagne. On 12 July 1859, the war ended with the Armistice of Villafranca, which called for the rulers of the occupied territories to be restored to their thrones. However, neither the Kingdom of Sardinia nor the Sardinian installed governments in the occupied territories wished for a return of the rulers. On 30 November 1859, the Duchy of Parma and Piacenza, the Duchy of Modena and Reggio, and the Papal Legations of the Romagne were united under the Royal Government of Emilia, which, on 1 January 1860, was redesignated as the Royal Provinces of Emilia. On 11 and 12 March 1860, the Royal Provinces of Emilia and the Grand Duchy of Tuscany voted in a plebiscite for annexation by the Kingdom of Sardinia. On 18 March 1860, the annexation act was presented to Victor Emmanuel II and the annexation completed. On 2 May 1860, the Royal Sardinian Army incorporated two Tuscan and eight Emilian sappers companies and, on the same day, the Sappers Regiment, which at the time consisted of five battalions, ceded some of its battalions to help from the 2nd Sappers Regiment in Piacenza. Consequently, the Sappers Regiment was renamed 1st Sappers Regiment.

The 2nd Sappers Regiment consisted of a staff, three battalions of four sappers companies per battalion, and a depot. Immediately after its formation, Garibaldi's Expedition of the Thousand triggered the Sardinian campaign in central and southern Italy, which led to the Siege to Gaeta. During the siege the regiment's 3rd Sappers Company and 7th Sappers Company distinguished themselves, for which both companies were awarded a Bronze Medal of Military Valor. After the surrender of Gaeta, the Kingdom of Sardinia annexed the Kingdom of the Two Sicilies and most of the remaining Papal Legations. On 17 March 1861, King Victor Emmanuel II proclaimed himself King of Italy.

After the annexation of the Kingdom of the Two Sicilies the 2nd Sappers Regiment provided troops for the suppression of the anti-Sardinian revolt in Southern Italy. In 1866, the regiment's companies fought in the Third Italian War of Independence. On 25 August 1867, the 1st and 2nd sappers regiments merged to form the Sappers Corps, which had its headquarters in Casale Monferrato and consisted of a staff and 28 sappers companies. In 1870, the 1st, 2nd, 4th, 10th, and 25th companies participated in the capture of Rome.

On 31 December 1873, the Sappers Corps and the 1st Artillery Regiment (Pontieri) were disbanded. The next day the Sappers Corps' staff in Casale Monferrato was used to form the 2nd Engineer Regiment, while the staff of the 1st Artillery Regiment (Pontieri) in Pavia was used to form the 1st Engineer Regiment. The 2nd Engineer Regiment retained 13 sappers companies, two Ferrovieri companies, one train company, and the depot of the disbanded Sappers Corps, while transferring 14 sappers companies and one Ferrovieri company to the 1st Engineer Regiment. In turn the 2nd Engineer Regiment received four Pontieri companies from the 1st Engineer Regiment. On 1 July 1874, the regiment formed a second train company, followed by third train company on 1 January 1876. On 1 January 1877, the regiment formed the 14th Sappers Company (Lagunari), which was based in Venice and tasked with operating in the Venetian Lagoon, Marano Lagoon, and Grado Lagoon.

On 1 January 1883, the regiment formed three sappers companies, three telegraphers companies, and one train company. On the same day, the regiment ceded its four Pontieri companies, the 14th Sappers Company (Lagunari), and a train company to help form the 4th Engineer Regiment. On 1 November of the same year, the regiment ceded three telegraphers companies, two Ferrovieri companies, two sappers companies, and a train company to help form the 3rd Engineer Regiment. On 1 November 1887, the regiment formed four new sappers companies. On 1 November 1895, the regiment ceded six sappers companies to help form the 5th Engineer Regiment (Miners). On the same day, the regiment was renamed 2nd Engineer Regiment (Sappers). At the time the regiment consisted of a staff, four sappers brigades of three sappers companies each, two train companies, and a depot. During the same year the regiment provided six officers and 243 enlisted for units deployed to Eritrea for the First Italo-Ethiopian War. In 1910, the brigades were renamed battalions. In 1911–12, the regiment's I Battalion and II Battalion were deployed to Libya for the Italo-Turkish War. In July 1912, the regiment formed a fifth sappers battalion.

=== World War I ===
During World War I, the regiment's depot mobilized 42 sappers battalion commands, 122 sappers companies, 52 bridge sections, 31 divisional cableway sections, six firefighters sections, five cableway sections for alpine groups, one territorial militia battalion command and six territorial militia companies, and 11 army corps engineer parks. The battalions and companies formed by the regiment fought in all sectors of the Italian Front, and on the Albanian Front and Western Front.

=== Interwar years ===
In April 1919, the regiment's LII Engineer Battalion was assigned to the Royal Italian Army's Expeditionary Force in the Eastern Mediterranean, which on 29 April 1919 occupied Antalya, and on 11 May 1919 Fethiye, Bodrum and Marmaris in Anatolia. Italy claimed the area as its sphere of influence as per the Agreement of Saint-Jean-de-Maurienne, which partitioned the Ottoman Empire. The Treaty of Sèvres confirmed an Italian zone of influence in the area and the Italian occupation of Antalya continued until October 1922 when Italy removed its troops from Anatolia. On 31 March 1920, the 1st Engineer Regiment (Sappers) and 2nd Engineer Regiment (Sappers) were disbanded and the next day, on 1 April 1920, the two regiments' companies were used to form an Army Corps Sappers Battalion for each of the Royal Italian Army's army corps.

On 1 October 1922, the Royal Italian Army formed the 1st Army Corps Engineer Grouping in Turin. The grouping received a Sappers Battalion and a Telegraphers Battalion, which had been formed on 1 April 1920 for the I Army Corps. The grouping also received a miners company from the disbanded Miners Engineer Regiment. After its formation the grouping consisted of a command, a sappers-miners battalion, a telegraphers battalion, which included six dovecotes located in Turin, Cuneo, Exilles, Fenestrelle, Vinadio, and Alessandria, a photo-electricians company, and a depot. In 1924, the grouping moved from Turin to Casale Monferrato.

In 1926, the Royal Italian Army formed an army corps command in Alessandria, which was designated II Army Corps. Subsequently, the 1st Army Corps Engineer Grouping was transferred from the I Army Corps to the II Army Corps, and consequently, on 11 October 1926, the grouping was renamed 2nd Engineer Regiment. Afterwards the regiment consisted of a command, a sappers-miners battalion, a cableway battalion, a telegraphers battalion, a depot, and six dovecotes located in Alessandria, Cuneo, Genoa, Vinadio, Tende, and Nava. The dovecotes in Turin, Exilles, Fenestrelle were transferred to the newly formed 1st Engineer Regiment, while the 7th Engineer Regiment ceded the dovecote in Nava to the 2nd Engineer Regiment. In February 1928, the regiment ceded a sappers-miners company to help form the 11th Engineer Regiment.

On 1 February 1931, the regiment reorganized its Cableway Battalion as Miners-Cableway Battalion, which was transferred on 28 October 1932 to the newly formed 1st Miners Regiment in Novi Ligure. On the same date, the regiment received the I Radio-Telegraphers Battalion of the disbanded 2nd Radio-Telegraphers Regiment.

In 1935, the regiment mobilized the XIV Cableway Battalion, an autonomous cableway company, a connections company, a sappers company, a mixed engineer company, a water platoon, a cableway replacements company, and two firefighting sections for the Second Italo-Ethiopian War. In January 1937, the telegraphers and radio-telegraphers battalions were renamed connections battalions.

=== World War II ===
During World War II the regiment's depot in Casale Monferrato mobilized the following units:

- Command of the 5th Engineer Grouping
- IV Mixed Engineer Battalion (for the 4th Alpine Division "Cuneense")
- V Telegraphers Battalion
- V Marconisti Battalion
- V Engineer Battalion
- XXVII Engineer Battalion
- LIV Mixed Engineer Battalion (for the 54th Infantry Division "Napoli")
- 5th and 6th mobile dovecotes
- and many smaller units

On 10 June 1940, the day Italy invaded France, the 5th Engineer Grouping was assigned to the 4th Army. At the time the grouping consisted of the I Telegraphers Battalion, V Marconisti Battalion, XVII Pontieri Battalion, and 1st Fire Prevention Company. In March 1942, the 5th Engineer Grouping was transferred from the 4th Army to the 8th Army, which deployed in summer 1942 to the Eastern Front. The 8th Army also included the Alpine Army Corps, which included the 4th Alpine Division "Cuneense". The IV Mixed Engineer Battalion, which was the engineer unit of the "Cuneense" division consisted of a command, the 114th Telegraphers and Marconisti Company, the 124th Engineer Company, and the 104th Photo-electricians Section. On 12 December 1942, the Red Army commenced Operation Little Saturn, which, in its first stage, attacked and encircled the Italian II Army Corps and XXXV Army Corps, to the southeast of the Alpine Army Corps. On 13 January 1943, the Red Army launched the second stage of Operation Little Saturn with the Voronezh Front encircling and destroying the Hungarian Second Army to the northwest of the Alpine Army Corps.

On the evening of 17 January 1943, the Alpine Army Corps commander, General Gabriele Nasci, ordered a full retreat. At this point only the 2nd Alpine Division "Tridentina" was still capable of conducting combat operations. The 40,000-strong mass of stragglers — Alpini and Italians from other commands, plus German and Hungarians — followed the "Tridentina" division, which led the way westwards to the new Axis lines. As the Soviets had already occupied every village, bitter battles had to be fought to clear the way. The retreat through the frozen steppe and constant skirmishes with Soviet forces decimated the Alpine Army Corps, which barely escaped annihilation during the Battle of Nikolayevka. In late January 1943, the remnants of the Alpine Army Corps reached Axis lines. On 11 February 1943, the survivors of the "Cuneense" division were counted and just 139 of the 1,240 men of the IV Mixed Engineer Battalion had reached Axis lines. For its bravery and sacrifice in the Soviet Union the IV Mixed Engineer Battalion was awarded a Silver Medal of Military Valor, which today is affixed to the flag of the 2nd Engineer Regiment and depicted on the regiment's coat of arms.

In the evening of 8 September 1943, the Armistice of Cassibile, which ended hostilities between the Kingdom of Italy and the Anglo-American Allies, was announced by General Dwight D. Eisenhower on Radio Algiers and by Marshal Pietro Badoglio on Italian radio. Germany reacted by invading Italy and the 2nd Engineer Regiment was disbanded soon thereafter by German forces.

==== 2nd Miners Regiment ====
On 28 October 1932, the Royal Italian Army disbanded the 1st Radio-Telegraphers Regiment in Verona. On the same day, the personnel of the disbanded regiment's command and depot was used to form the command and depot of the newly formed 2nd Miners Regiment. The new regiment consisted of a command and three miners battalions, which were ceded by the 4th Engineer Regiment, 5th Engineer Regiment, and 11th Engineer Regiment.

In 1935–36, the regiment provided 20 officers and 417 enlisted to units deployed for the Second Italo-Ethiopian War. During World War II, the depot of the 2nd Miners Regiment in Verona mobilized the V, VI, VII, VIII, X, and CV miners battalions. The regiment was disbanded by invading German forces after the announcement of the Armistice of Cassibile on 8 September 1943.

=== Cold War ===
On 20 April 1954, the Italian Army formed the 2nd Engineer Grouping in Bolzano, which consisted of the II Miners Battalion, the IV Pioneers Fortification Battalion, and the V Pioneers Fortification Battalion. On 1 July 1954, the V Pioneers Fortification Battalion moved from Sterzing to Orcenico Superiore, where it joined the 3rd Engineer Grouping. On 1 April 1955, the 2nd Engineer Grouping was renamed 2nd Engineer Regiment and assigned to the IV Army Corps. On 7 May 1955, the regiment received the 1st Camouflage Company from the 5th Engineer Regiment and on 1 July of the same year, the regiment received the IV Engineer Battalion from the 1st Engineer Regiment. Afterwards the 2nd Engineer Regiment consisted of the following units:

- 2nd Engineer Regiment, in Bolzano
  - Command Platoon, in Bolzano
  - II Miners Battalion, in Bolzano
  - IV Pioneers Fortification Battalion, in Sterzing
  - IV Engineer Battalion, in Bolzano
  - 1st Camouflage Company, in Bolzano

In October 1963, the regiment's troops were sent to Longarone to help rescue efforts after the Vajont dam disaster. For its conduct in Longarone the regiment was awarded a Silver Medal of Civil Valor, which was affixed to the regiment's flag and added to the regiment's coat of arms. On 16 January, 1964 the IV Pioneers Fortification Battalion was disbanded, while the 1st Camouflage Company merged with the 1st Engineer Regiment's 1st Mechanics-Electricians Company and 1st Photo-Electricians Company to form the Mixed Photo-Electricians-Camouflage Company. On 1 March of the same year, the regiment received VII Engineer Battalion in Riva del Garda, the XIV Army Corps Engineer Battalion in Trento, the 1st Cableway Company in Trento, and the Mixed Photo-Electricians-Camouflage Company in Trento, from the disbanded 1st Engineer Regiment. Afterwards the 2nd Engineer Regiment consisted of the following units:

- 2nd Engineer Regiment, in Bolzano
  - Command Platoon, in Bolzano
  - II Miners Battalion, in Bolzano
  - IV Engineer Battalion, in Bolzano
  - VII Engineer Battalion, in Riva del Garda
  - XIV Army Corps Engineer Battalion, in Trento
  - 1st Cableway Company, in Trento
  - Mixed Photo-Electricians-Camouflage Company, in Trento

In 1974, the 1st Cableway Company and the Mixed Photo-Electricians-Camouflage Company were disbanded. On 28 May 1975, the IV Engineer Battalion and VII Engineer Battalion were disbanded. During the 1975 army reform the army disbanded the regimental level and newly independent battalions were granted for the first time their own flags. During the reform engineer battalions were named for a lake, if they supported an corps-level command, or a river, if they supported a division or brigade. On 6 November 1975, the 2nd Engineer Regiment was disbanded. The next day, on 7 November 1975, the disbanded regiment's II Miners Battalion and XIV Army Corps Engineer Battalion became autonomous units. On the same day, the II Miners Battalion was renamed 2nd Miners Battalion "Iseo", while the XIV Army Corps Engineer Battalion was renamed 4th Engineer Battalion "Orta". The battalion was named for the great pre-alpine Lake Iseo in Lombardy. The "Iseo" battalion was assigned, together with the 4th Engineer Battalion "Orta", to the 4th Alpine Army Corps' Engineer Command. After the reform the 2nd Engineer Battalion "Iseo" consisted of a command, a command and park company, and three miners companies. At the time the battalion fielded 753 men (38 officers, 95 non-commissioned officers, and 620 soldiers).

On 22 January 1976, the battalion received the Cappello Alpino. On 12 November 1976, the President of the Italian Republic Giovanni Leone assigned with decree 846 the flag and traditions of the 2nd Engineer Regiment and the traditions of the 2nd Miners Regiment to the battalion.

For its conduct and work after the 1976 Friuli earthquake the battalion was awarded a Bronze Medal of Army Valor, which was affixed to the battalion's flag and added to the battalion's coat of arms. In July 1985, the battalion was sent to the Val di Stava, after the tailings dams of the mine in the valley collapsed and flooded the valley. On 1 August 1986, the Command and Park Company split into the Command and Services Company and the Special Equipment Company. On the same day, the battalion was renamed 2nd Sappers Battalion "Iseo". Afterwards the battalion consisted of the following units:

- 2nd Sappers Battalion "Iseo", in Bolzano
  - Command and Services Company
  - 1st Sappers Company
  - 2nd Sappers Company
  - 3rd Sappers Company
  - Special Equipment Company

=== Recent times ===
On 3 October 1993, 4th Engineer Battalion "Orta" in Trento lost its autonomy and the next day the battalion entered the reformed 1st Pioneer Regiment. As the flag of the 1st Engineer Regiment was still stored at the Shrine of the Flags in the Vittoriano in Rome, the 1st Pioneer Regiment continued to use the flag of the 4th Engineer Regiment, which had been assigned to the 4th Engineer Battalion "Orta" during the 1975 reform. On 13 October 1995, the 2nd Sappers Battalion "Iseo" in Bolzano was disbanded. On the same day, the flag of the 2nd Engineer Regiment was transferred from Bolzano to Trento, where, upon the arrival of the flag, the 1st Pioneer Regiment was renamed 2nd Engineer Regiment, while the regiment's Pioneer Battalion "Orta" was renamed Sappers Battalion "Iseo". Afterwards, the flag of the 4th Engineer Regiment was transferred from Trento to Palermo, where it arrived and was assigned to the 4th Pioneer Regiment on 24 October 1995.

In 2002, the 2nd Engineer Regiment was transferred from the Alpine Troops Command to the Alpine Brigade "Julia". After the August 2016 earthquake in Central Italy the regiment's companies deployed to the area to assist in the recovery efforts and to provide engineering services to the affected communities. For its service after the earthquake the regiment was awarded a Silver Cross of Army Merit, which was affixed to the regiment's flag. For its conduct and work during the COVID-19 pandemic the regiment was awarded in 2022 a Silver Cross of Army Merit, which was affixed to the regiment's flag.

== Organization ==
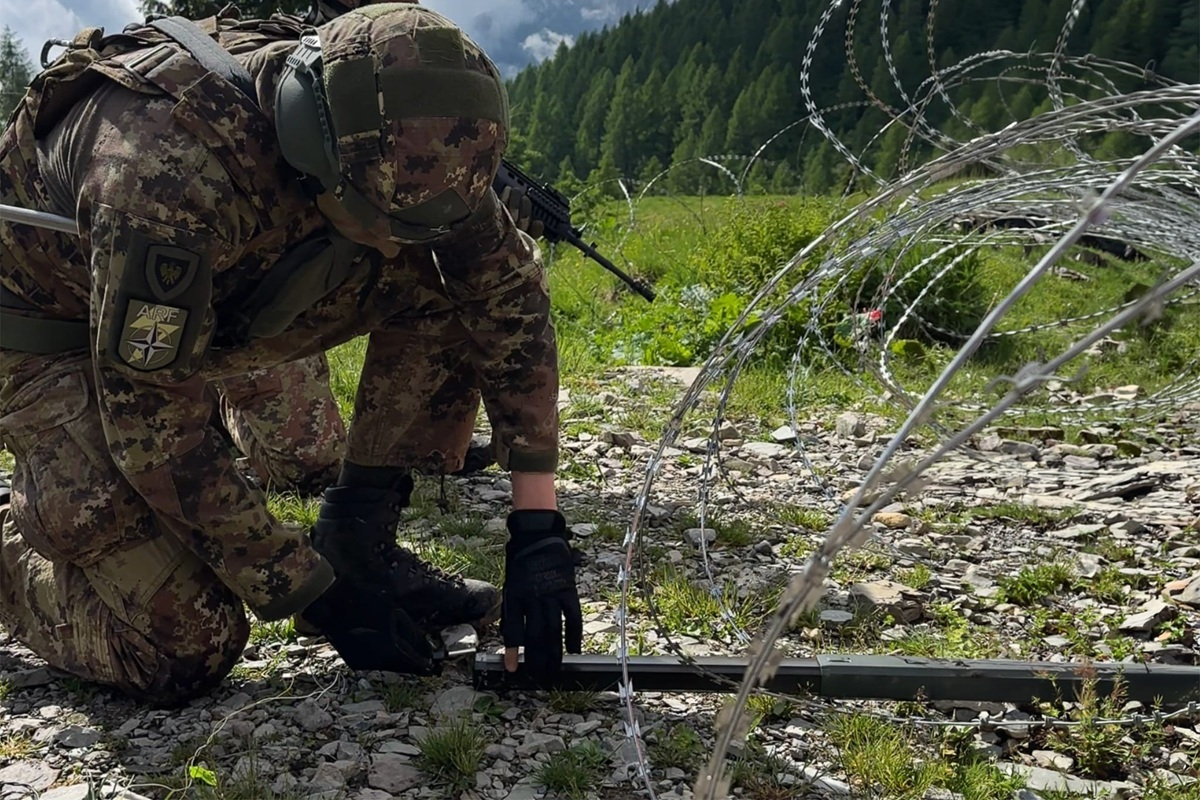
2nd Engineer Regiment sapper preparing to blow up an obstacle with a bangalore torpedo during exercise Alabarda D'argento 2026

As of 2026 the 2nd Engineer Regiment is organized as follows:

- 2nd Engineer Regiment, in Trento
  - Command and Logistic Support Company
  - Sappers Battalion "Iseo"
    - 1st Sappers Company
    - 2nd Sappers Company
    - 3rd Sappers Company
    - Deployment Support Company

== See also ==
- Alpine Brigade "Julia"
