= 4th Engineer Regiment (Italy) =

Active Italian Army combat engineer unit

- 4° Reggimento Genio Guastatori
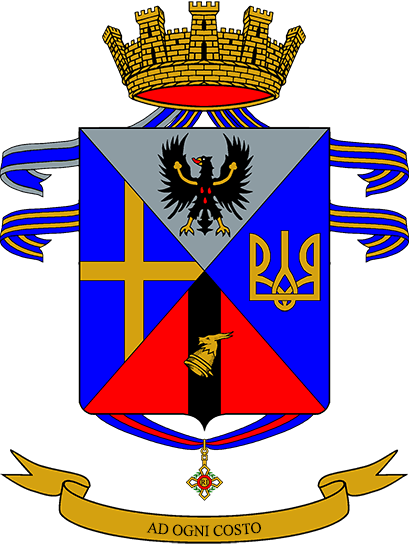
- Regimental coat of arms
- Active: 1 Nov. 1926 – 8 Sept. 1943; 7 Nov. 1975 – today
- Country: Italy
- Branch: Italian Army
- Role: Combat engineers
- Part of: Mechanized Brigade "Aosta"
- Garrison/HQ: Palermo
- Motto: "Ad ogni costo"
- Anniversaries: 24 June 1918 – Second Battle of the Piave River
- Decorations: 1× Military Order of Italy; 1× Silver Medal of Military Valor; 1× Gold Medal of Army Valor; 2× Bronze Medals of Army Valor; 1× Bronze Cross of Army Merit

Insignia
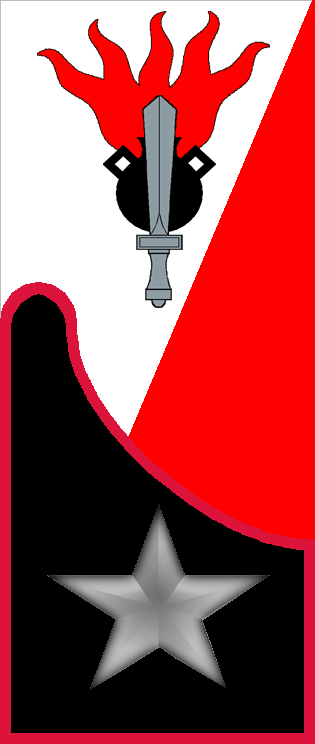
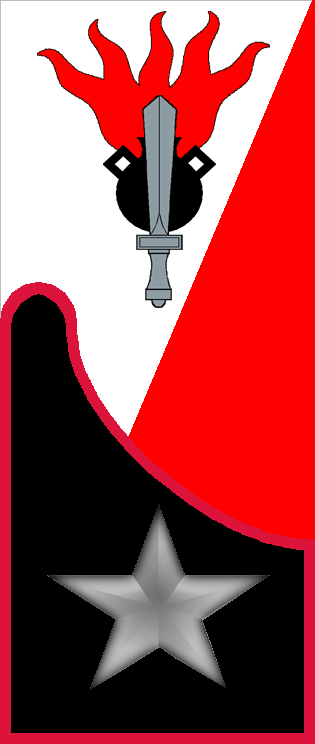
- Sappers gorget patches

The 4th Engineer Regiment (Italian: 4° Reggimento Genio Guastatori) is a military engineering regiment of the Italian Army based in Palermo in Sicily. The regiment is the engineer unit of the Mechanized Brigade "Aosta". In 1926, the Royal Italian Army formed the 4th Engineer Regiment in Verona. During the Second Italo-Ethiopian War and World War II the regiment's depot formed engineer battalions and smaller units, which deployed with divisions and corps to the fronts of the war. After the announcement of the Armistice of Cassibile on 8 September 1943 the regiment was disbanded by invading German forces.

In 1975, the 2nd Engineer Regiment's XIV Army Corps Engineer Battalion became an autonomous unit and renamed 4th Engineer Battalion "Orta". After the regiment was disbanded, the flag and traditions of the 4th Engineer Regiment were transferred to the 4th Engineer Battalion "Orta". The battalion was based in Trento and assigned to the 4th Alpine Army Corps's Engineer Command. In 1992, the 51st Engineer Battalion "Simeto" in Palermo lost its autonomy and entered the reformed 4th Pioneer Regiment. The reformed regiment retained the flag of the "Simeto" battalion until the flag of the 4th Engineer Regiment was transferred from Trento to Palermo and assigned to the 4th Pioneer Regiment in 1995. The regiment's anniversary falls, as for all engineer units, on 24 June 1918, the last day of the Second Battle of the Piave River.

== History ==
On 1 January 1883, the Royal Italian Army formed the 4th Engineer Regiment, which on 1 November 1895 was renamed 4th Engineer Regiment (Pontieri). After the end of World War I the Royal Italian Army reorganized its forces and on 21 November 1919, the 8th Engineer Regiment (Lagunari) was disbanded and the regiment's only remaining Lagunari battalion, as well as the traditions of the 8th Engineer Regiment (Lagunari), were transferred to 4th Engineer Regiment (Pontieri), which changed its name on the same day to Pontieri and Lagunari Engineer Regiment. On 15 May 1933, the regiment was split into the 1st Pontieri Regiment (Light Bridges) and 2nd Pontieri Regiment (Heavy Bridges), with the latter regiment retaining the traditions of the Pontieri and Lagunari Engineer Regiment, which also included the traditions of 4th Engineer Regiment (Pontieri). Since then the traditions of the 4th Engineer Regiment (Pontieri) are perpetuated by the 2nd Pontieri Engineer Regiment.

=== Interwar years ===
On 1 October 1922, the Royal Italian Army formed the 3rd Army Corps Engineer Grouping in Verona. The grouping received a Sappers Battalion and a Telegraphers Battalion, which had been formed on 1 April 1920 for the IV Army Corps. On the same date, 1 October 1922, the IV Army Corps was renumbered as III Army Corps. The grouping also received a miners company from the disbanded Miners Engineer Regiment. After its formation the grouping consisted of a command, a sappers-miners battalion, a telegraphers battalion, which included three dovecotes located in Verona, Trento, and Bolzano, a photo-electricians company, and a depot.

In 1926, the III Army Corps was renumbered as IV Army Corps and consequently, on 1 November 1926, the grouping was renamed 4th Engineer Regiment. During the same year the regiment received a dovecote in Treviso from the 6th Engineer Regiment and disbanded the dovecote in Trento. In February 1928, the regiment ceded a telegraphers company and the dovecote in Treviso to help form the 11th Engineer Regiment. On 1 February 1931, the regiment formed a Miners-Cableway Battalion, which was transferred on 28 October 1932 to the newly formed 2nd Miners Regiment in Verona. On the same date, the regiment received the 7th Company/ IV Battalion of the disbanded 2nd Radio-Telegraphers Regiment.

On 1 October, 1934 the regiment received a radio-telegraphers battalion from the 3rd Engineer Regiment. Afterwards the regiment consisted of a command, a sappers-miners battalion, a telegraphers battalion, a radio-telegraphers battalion, a non-commissioned officer recruits company, three dovecotes, and a depot.

In July 1935, in preparation for the Second Italo-Ethiopian War, the regiment mobilized the LI Mixed Engineer Battalion for the 32nd Motorized Division "Trento", which was deployed in December 1935 to Libya to deter Great Britain from closing the Suez Canal for Italian shipping. The regiment also formed the V Mixed Engineer Battalion for cavalry division and a mixed engineer company for the 5th Alpine Division "Pusteria". The "Pusteria" division deployed to Eritrea and fought in the northern campaign in Ethiopia. In 1936, the regiment moved from Verona to Bolzano. In January 1937, the telegraphers and radio-telegraphers battalions were renamed connections battalions.

=== World War II ===
During World War II the regiment's depot in Bolzano mobilized the following units:

- Command of the 9th Engineer Grouping
- I Engineer Battalion
- I Mixed Connections Battalion (for the Army of the Po)
- II Mixed Engineer Battalion (for the 2nd Alpine Division "Tridentina")
- V Mixed Engineer Battalion (for the 5th Alpine Division "Pusteria")
- VI Army Corps Mixed Engineer Battalion (for the Armored Army Corps; disbanded 10 March 1941 and battalion command used to form the command of the XXX Sappers Battalion on 15 March 1941)
- XIII Engineer Battalion
- XXI Engineer Battalion
- LI Mixed Engineer Battalion (for the 102nd Motorized Division "Trento")
- CXXXII Mixed Engineer Battalion (for the 132nd Armored Division "Ariete")
- 1st, 9th, 11th, and 32nd mobile dovecotes
- and many smaller units, including the 107th Mixed Telegraphers and Radio-Telegraphers Company

On 10 June 1940, the day Italy invaded France, the 9th Engineer Grouping was assigned to the Army of the Po. At the time the grouping consisted of the I Mixed Connections Battalion, XIII and XXI engineer battalions, and I and IX Pontieri battalions. On 10 February 1941, the grouping left the Army of the Po and the XIII and XXI engineer battalions, and I and IX Pontieri battalions were transferred theto the 4th Army. On the same day, 10 February 1941, the grouping moved from Verona to Cava dei Tirreni in Campania. In Campania the grouping consisted of the I Mixed Connections Battalion, 140th Marconisti Company, 1st Photo-electricians Company, and the 35th Chemical Company. In 1943, the grouping moved to Villa Pergusa near Enna in Sicily, where it was assigned to the 6th Army's Engineer Command. The 6th Army was tasked with the defense of the Sicily and at the time the grouping consisted of the II Telegraphers Battalion, XI Marconisti Battalion, the CIV and CV miners battalions, the 14th mobile dovecote, and various smaller units dispersed on the island. In July 1943, the 9th Engineer Grouping and its units were destroyed during the Sicilian campaign.

In winter 1940–41, the II Mixed Engineer Battalion and V Mixed Engineer Battalion fought in the Greco-Italian War, while the LI Mixed Engineer Battalion and CXXXII Mixed Engineer Battalion fought in the Western Desert campaign in Libya and Egypt. In summer 1942, the Alpine Army Corps, which included the XXX Sappers Battalion and the 2nd Alpine Division "Tridentina", was sent to the Eastern Front. The II Mixed Engineer Battalion, which was the engineer unit of the "Tridentina" division consisted of a command, the 112th Telegraphers and Marconisti Company, the 122nd Engineer Company, and the 102nd Photo-electricians Section, while the XXX Sappers Battalion, consisted of the 6th and 9th sappers companies. On 12 December 1942, the Red Army commenced Operation Little Saturn, which, in its first stage, attacked and encircled the Italian II Army Corps and XXXV Army Corps, to the southeast of the Alpine Army Corps. On 13 January 1943, the Red Army launched the second stage of Operation Little Saturn with the Voronezh Front encircling and destroying the Hungarian Second Army to the northwest of the Alpine Army Corps.

On the evening of 17 January 1943, the Alpine Army Corps commander, General Gabriele Nasci, ordered a full retreat. At this point only the 2nd Alpine Division "Tridentina" was still capable of conducting combat operations. The 40,000-strong mass of stragglers — Alpini and Italians from other commands, plus German and Hungarians — followed the "Tridentina" division, which led the way westwards to the new Axis lines. As the Soviets had already occupied every village, bitter battles had to be fought to clear the way. The retreat through the frozen steppe and constant skirmishes with Soviet forces decimated the Alpine Army Corps, which barely escaped annihilation during the Battle of Nikolayevka. In late January 1943, the remnants of the Alpine Army Corps reached Axis lines and in March the few survivors were repatriated. For their conduct and sacrifice on the Eastern Front the II Mixed Engineer Battalion and XXX Sappers Battalion were both awarded a Silver Medal of Military Valor. The Silver Medal of Military Valor, which was awarded to the II Mixed Engineer Battalion, is today affixed to the flag of the 4th Engineer Regiment and depicted on the regiment's coat of arms, while the Silver Medal of Military Valor, which was awarded to the III Sappers Battalion, is today affixed to the flag of the 32nd Engineer Regiment and depicted on that regiment's coat of arms.

In the evening of 8 September 1943, the Armistice of Cassibile, which ended hostilities between the Kingdom of Italy and the Anglo-American Allies, was announced by General Dwight D. Eisenhower on Radio Algiers and by Marshal Pietro Badoglio on Italian radio. Germany reacted by invading Italy and the 4th Engineer Regiment was disbanded soon thereafter by German forces.

=== Cold War ===
On 29 February 1964, the 1st Engineer Regiment was disbanded and the next day, on 1 March 1964, the disbanded regiment's VII Engineer Battalion in Riva del Garda and XIV Army Corps Engineer Battalion in Trento were transferred to the 2nd Engineer Regiment. At the time the 2nd Engineer Regiment was the military engineering unit of the IV Army Corps.

During the 1975 army reform the army disbanded the regimental level and newly independent battalions were granted for the first time their own flags. During the reform engineer battalions were named for a lake, if they supported an corps-level command, or a river, if they supported a division or brigade. On 6 November 1975, the 2nd Engineer Regiment was disbanded. The next day, on 7 November 1975, the disbanded regiment's II Miners Battalion and XIV Army Corps Engineer Battalion became autonomous units. On the same day, the II Miners Battalion was renamed 2nd Miners Battalion "Iseo", while the XIV Army Corps Engineer Battalion was renamed 4th Engineer Battalion "Orta". The battalion was named for the great pre-alpine Lake Orta in Piedmont. The "Orta" battalion was assigned, together with the 2nd Miners Battalion "Iseo", to the 4th Alpine Army Corps' Engineer Command. After the reform the 4th Engineer Battalion "Orta" consisted of a command, a command and park company, and three engineer companies, one of which was a reserve unit. At the time the battalion fielded 756 men (38 officers, 98 non-commissioned officers, and 620 soldiers).

On 12 November 1976, the President of the Italian Republic Giovanni Leone assigned with decree 846 the flag and traditions of the 4th Engineer Regiment to the battalion.

For its conduct and work after the 1976 Friuli earthquake the battalion was awarded a Bronze Medal of Army Valor, which was affixed to the battalion's flag and added to the battalion's coat of arms. On 15 May 1977, the battalion's 3rd Engineer Company, which initially had been a reserve unit, became an active unit. After the 1980 Irpinia earthquake, the battalion was deployed to southern Italy for the rescue efforts. For its conduct and work in southern Italy the battalion was awarded a second Bronze Medal of Army Valor, which was affixed to the battalion's flag and added to the battalion's coat of arms. In November 1986, the Command and Park Company split into the Command and Services Company and the Special Equipment Company. Afterwards the battalion consisted of the following units

- 4th Engineer Battalion "Orta", in Trento
  - Command and Services Company
  - 1st Engineer Company
  - 2nd Engineer Company
  - 3rd Engineer Company
  - Special Equipment Company

=== Recent times ===
After the Cold War the Italian Army began a reorganization of its forces: on 19 September 1992, the 51st Engineer Battalion "Simeto" in Palermo lost its autonomy and the next day the battalion entered the reformed 4th Pioneer Regiment as Pioneer Battalion "Simeto". As the flag of the 4th Engineer Regiment was still assigned to the 4th Engineer Battalion "Orta" in Trento, the reformed regiment continued to use temporarily the flag of the "Simeto" battalion. On 3 October 1993, 4th Engineer Battalion "Orta" lost its autonomy and the next day the battalion entered the reformed 1st Pioneer Regiment as Pioneer Battalion "Orta". As the flag of the 1st Engineer Regiment was still stored at the Shrine of the Flags in the Vittoriano in Rome, the 1st Pioneer Regiment continued to use temporarily the flag of the 4th Engineer Regiment.

On 13 October 1995, the 2nd Sappers Battalion "Iseo" in Bolzano was disbanded. On the same day, the flag of the 2nd Engineer Regiment, which had been assigned in 1975 to the 2nd Miners Battalion "Iseo", was transferred from Bolzano to Trento, where, upon the arrival of the flag, the 1st Pioneer Regiment was renamed 2nd Engineer Regiment, while the regiment's Pioneer Battalion "Orta" was renamed Sappers Battalion "Iseo". Afterwards, the flag of the 4th Engineer Regiment was transferred from Trento to Palermo, where it arrived and was assigned to the 4th Pioneer Regiment on 24 October 1995. Subsequently, the flag of the 51st Engineer Battalion "Simeto" was transferred to the Shrine of the Flags in the Vittoriano in Rome for safekeeping.

In 2001 and 2002, the regiment was deployed to provide heavy military engineering equipment during the eruptions of Mount Etna and Stromboli. For its work and conduct in these two events the regiment was awarded a Gold Medal of Army Valor, which was affixed to the regiment's flag and added to the regiment's coat of arms. In 2022, the regiment was awarded in a Military Order of Italy for its many deployments outside of Italy. The order was affixed to the regiment's flag and is depicted on the regiment's coat of arms.

== Organization ==
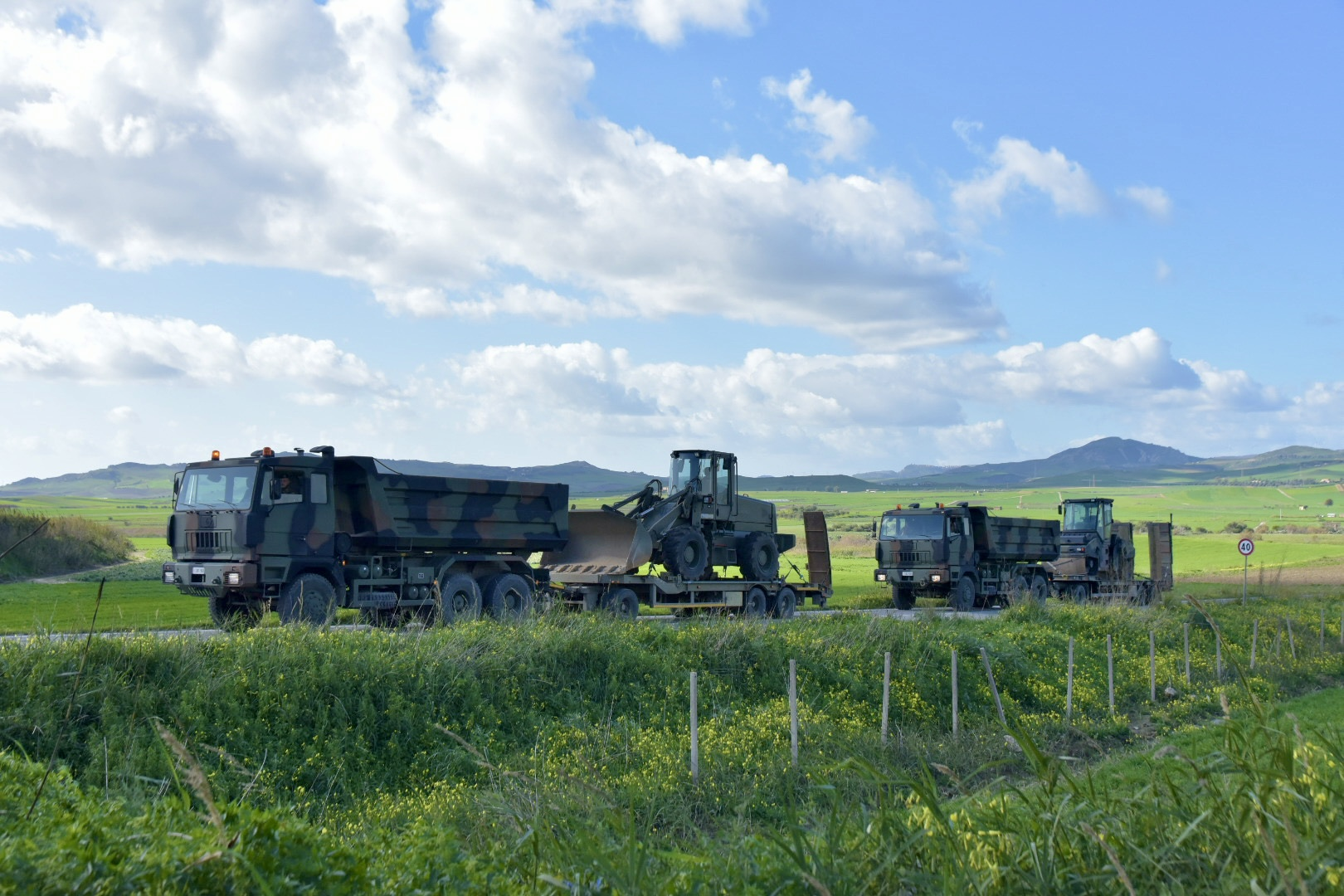
4th Engineer Regiment convoy in Sicily in January 2026

As of 2024 the 4th Engineer Regiment is organized as follows:

- 4th Engineer Regiment, in Palermo
  - Command and Logistic Support Company
  - Sappers Battalion "Simeto"
    - 1st Sappers Company
    - 2nd Sappers Company
    - 3rd Sappers Company
    - Deployment Support Company

== See also ==
- Mechanized Brigade "Aosta"
