= 1st Engineer Regiment (Italy) =

Inactive Italian Army engineer unit

- 1° Reggimento Genio
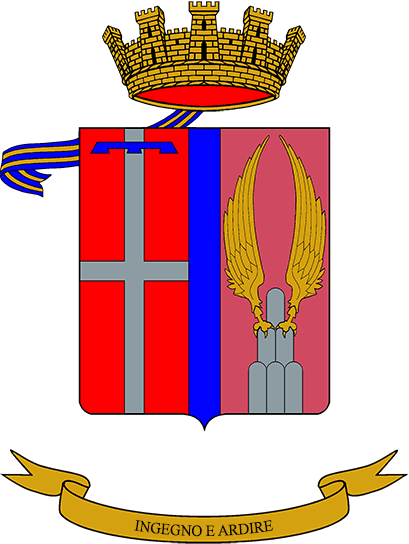
- Regimental coat of arms
- Active: 29 Sept. 1848 — 25 Aug. 1867; 1 Jan. 1874 — 31 March 1920; 15 Nov. 1926 — 8 Sept. 1943; 1 March 1950 — 29 Feb. 1964; 1 Jan. 1976 — 31 March 1991; 4 Oct. 1993 — 13 Oct. 1995
- Country: Italy
- Branch: Italian Army
- Role: Combat engineers
- Part of: Alpine Army Corps
- Garrison/HQ: Trento
- Motto: "Ingegno e ardire"
- Anniversaries: 24 June 1918 - Second Battle of the Piave River
- Decorations: 1× Silver Medal of Army Valor

Insignia
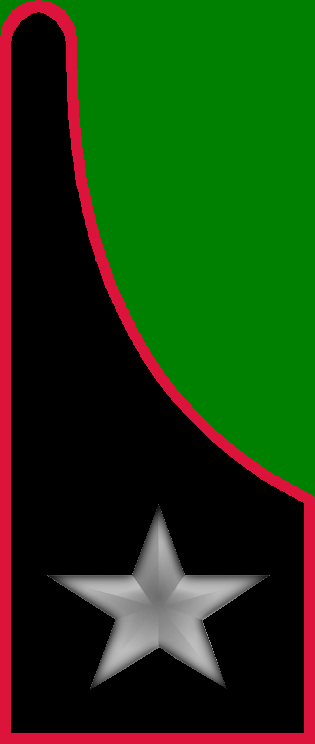
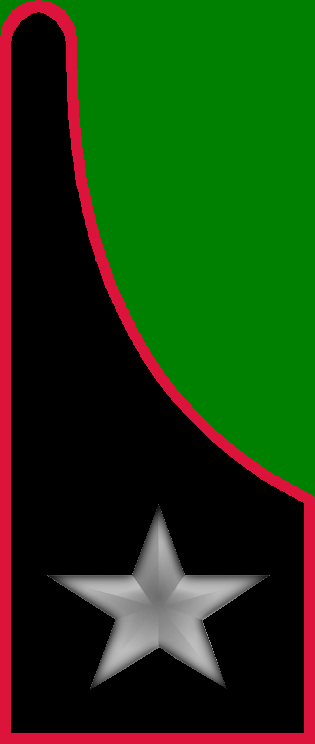
- Sappers gorget patches

The 1st Engineer Regiment (Italian: 1° Reggimento Genio) is an inactive military engineering unit of the Italian Army, which was last based in Trento in Trentino. The regiment is the oldest engineer regiment of the Italian Army. In 1848, the Royal Sardinian Army formed the Sappers Regiment, which in 1860 was split into the 1st Sappers Regiment and 2nd Sappers Regiment. Between its formation and 1866, the regiment's companies fought in the First Italian War of Independence, Crimean War, Second Italian War of Independence, Sardinian campaign in central and southern Italy, and the Third Italian War of Independence. In 1867, the two sappers regiments were merged into the Sappers Corps, which, in 1874, was disbanded so the two regiments could be reformed. The 1st Engineer Regiment provided personnel for First Italo-Ethiopian War and two sappers battalions for the Italo-Turkish War. During World War I the regiment's battalions and companies fought in all sectors of the Italian Front, and on the Macedonian Front, Albanian Front, and Western Front. In 1920, the regiment was disbanded. In November 1926, the regiment was reformed and assigned to the I Army Corps. During the Second Italo-Ethiopian War and World War II the regiment's depot formed engineer battalions and smaller units, which deployed with divisions and corps to the fronts of the war. After the announcement of the Armistice of Cassibile on 8 September 1943 the regiment was disbanded by invading German forces.

In 1950, the Italian Army reformed the 1st Engineer Regiment, which in 1954 was assigned to the IV Army Corps. In 1964, the regiment was disbanded. During the 1975 army reform the 5th Engineer Regiment was disbanded and the regiment's I Miners Battalion became autonomous unit. The battalion was renamed 1st Miners Battalion "Garda" and assigned the flag and traditions of the 1st Engineer Regiment and the traditions of the 1st Miners Regiment. The battalion was based in Udine and assigned to the 5th Army Corps's Engineer Command. In 1991, the battalion was disbanded and the flag of the 1st Engineer Regiment transferred to the Shrine of the Flags in the Vittoriano in Rome. In 1993, the regiment was reformed as 1st Pioneer Regiment in Trento. In 1995, the regiment was once more disbanded. The regiment's anniversary falls, as for all engineer units, on 24 June 1918, the last day of the Second Battle of the Piave River.

== History ==
=== Italian Wars of Independence ===
On 29 September 1848, during the First Italian War of Independence, the Royal Sardinian Army formed a Sappers Regiment in Alessandria, which consisted of a staff and two battalions, each of which fielded four sappers companies and one miners company. In March 1849, the regiment's companies fought in the second campaign of the First Italian War of Independence. In 1853, the regiment moved from Alessandria to Casale Monferrato. In 1855, the regiment's 1st, 2nd, 6th, and 7th companies were grouped together in a Provisional Sappers Battalion, which deployed with the Sardinian expeditionary corps to Crimea for the Crimean War.

In May 1859, during the Second Italian War of Independence, Sardinian forces occupied the Grand Duchy of Tuscany, the Duchy of Parma and Piacenza, the Duchy of Modena and Reggio, and the Papal Legations of the Romagne. On 12 July 1859, the war ended with the Armistice of Villafranca, which called for the rulers of the occupied territories to be restored to their thrones. However, neither the Kingdom of Sardinia nor the Sardinian installed governments in the occupied territories wished for a return of the rulers. In September of the same year, the Sappers Regiment formed three additional battalions. On 30 November 1859, the Duchy of Parma and Piacenza, the Duchy of Modena and Reggio, and the Papal Legations of the Romagne were united under the Royal Government of Emilia, which, on 1 January 1860, was redesignated as the Royal Provinces of Emilia. On 11 and 12 March 1860, the Royal Provinces of Emilia and the Grand Duchy of Tuscany voted in a plebiscite for annexation by the Kingdom of Sardinia. On 18 March 1860, the annexation act was presented to Victor Emmanuel II and the annexation completed. On 2 May 1860, the Royal Sardinian Army incorporated two Tuscan and eight Emilian sappers companies and, on the same day, the Sappers Regiment ceded some of its battalions to help from the 2nd Sappers Regiment in Piacenza. Consequently, the Sappers Regiment was renamed 1st Sappers Regiment.

The 1st Sappers Regiment consisted of a staff, three battalions of four sappers companies per battalion, and a depot. Immediately after its formation, Garibaldi's Expedition of the Thousand triggered the Sardinian campaign in central and southern Italy, during which the regiment's companies fought in the Siege of Civitella del Tronto, the Siege to Gaeta, and the Siege of Messina. After the surrender of Gaeta, the Kingdom of Sardinia annexed the Kingdom of the Two Sicilies and most of the remaining Papal Legations. On 17 March 1861, King Victor Emmanuel II proclaimed himself King of Italy.

After the annexation of the Kingdom of the Two Sicilies the 1st Sappers Regiment provided troops for the suppression of the anti-Sardinian revolt in Southern Italy. In 1866, during the Third Italian War of Independence, the regiment's companies fought at Borgoforte and in the Battle of Custoza. On 25 August 1867, the 1st and 2nd sappers regiments merged to form the Sappers Corps, which had its headquarters in Casale Monferrato and consisted of a staff and 28 sappers companies. In 1870, the 1st, 2nd, 4th, 10th, and 25th companies participated in the capture of Rome.

On 31 December 1873, the Sappers Corps and the 1st Artillery Regiment (Pontieri) were disbanded. The next day, the staff of the 1st Artillery Regiment (Pontieri) in Pavia was used to form the 1st Engineer Regiment, while the Sappers Corps' staff in Casale Monferrato was used to form the 2nd Engineer Regiment. The 1st Engineer Regiment retained four Pontieri companies, two train companies, and the depot of the disbanded 1st Artillery Regiment (Pontieri), while transferring four Pontieri companies to the 2nd Engineer Regiment. In turn the 1st Engineer Regiment received 14 sappers companies and one Ferrovieri company from the 2nd Engineer Regiment. On 1 January 1876, the regiment formed a third train company and, on 1 November 1877, a second Ferrovieri company.

On 1 January 1883, the regiment formed two sappers companies, three telegraphers companies, and one train company. On the same day, the regiment ceded its four Pontieri companies and a train company to help form the 4th Engineer Regiment. On 1 November of the same year, the regiment ceded three telegraphers companies, two Ferrovieri companies, two sappers companies, and a train company to help form the 3rd Engineer Regiment. On 1 November 1887, the regiment formed four new sappers companies. On 1 November 1895, the regiment ceded six sappers companies to help form the 5th Engineer Regiment (Miners). On the same day, the regiment was renamed 1st Engineer Regiment (Sappers). At the time the regiment consisted of a staff, four sappers brigades of three sappers companies each, two train companies, and a depot. During the same year the regiment provided seven officers and 298 enlisted for units deployed to Eritrea for the First Italo-Ethiopian War. In 1910, the brigades were renamed battalions. In 1911-12, the regiment's I Battalion, III Battalion and two army corps engineer parks were deployed to Libya for the Italo-Turkish War. In July 1912, the regiment formed a fifth sappers battalion.

=== World War I ===
During World War I, the regiment's depot mobilized 37 sappers battalion commands, 114 sappers companies, nine flamethrowers companies, one firefighters company, 40 bridge sections, 35 divisional telephone sections, four telephone sections for alpine groups, three gas launcher sections, a disk launcher section, four territorial militia battalion commands and 19 territorial militia companies, and 15 army corps engineer parks. The Disk Launcher Section was equipped with Cantono disk launchers, which were designed to launch disks that could cut through barbed wire obstacles. The battalions and companies formed by the regiment fought in all sectors of the Italian Front, and on the Macedonian Front, Albanian Front, and Western Front.

=== Interwar years ===
On 31 March 1920, the 1st Engineer Regiment (Sappers) and 2nd Engineer Regiment (Sappers) were disbanded and the next day, on 1 April 1920, the two regiments' companies were used to form an Army Corps Sappers Battalion for each of the Royal Italian Army's army corps.

On 1 October 1922, the Royal Italian Army formed the 1st Army Corps Engineer Grouping in Turin, which was assigned to the I Army Corps. In 1924, the grouping moved from Turin to Casale Monferrato. In 1926, the Royal Italian Army formed an army corps command in Alessandria, which was designated II Army Corps. Subsequently, the 1st Army Corps Engineer Grouping was transferred from the I Army Corps to the II Army Corps, and consequently, on 11 October 1926, the grouping was renamed 2nd Engineer Regiment. On 15 November 1926, the Royal Italian Army reformed the 1st Engineer Regiment in Vercelli as the I Army Corps's engineer regiment. The reformed regiment consisted of a command, a sappers-miners battalion, a cableway battalion, a telegraphers battalion, a depot, and five dovecotes located in Turin, Novara, Fenestrelle, Susa, and Aosta.

On 1 February 1931, the regiment reorganized its Cableway Battalion as Miners-Cableway Battalion, which was transferred on 28 October 1932 to the newly formed 1st Miners Regiment in Novi Ligure. On the same date, the regiment received the III Radio-Telegraphers Battalion of the disbanded 2nd Radio-Telegraphers Regiment In 1935, the regiment mobilized the 64th Engineer Company, 26th Signal Company, 26th Water Platoon, 9th Photo-Electricians Section, and 11th Photo-Electricians Section for the Second Italo-Ethiopian War. In 1936, the regiment moved from Vercelli to Turin. In January 1937, the telegraphers and radio-telegraphers battalions were renamed connections battalions.

=== World War II ===
During World War II the regiment's depot in Turin mobilized the following units:

- Command of the 1st Engineer Grouping
- I Telegraphers Battalion
- I Mixed Engineer Battalion (for the 1st Alpine Division "Taurinense")
- VI Engineer Battalion
- IX Engineer Battalion
- XI Mixed Engineer Battalion (for the 6th Alpine Division "Alpi Graie")
- CI Mixed Engineer Battalion (for the 1st Infantry Division "Superga")
- and many smaller units

On 30 December 1940, 1st Engineer Grouping was sent to Albania. Upon arrival the grouping was renamed Armed Forces Albania Engineer Grouping. After its arrival in Albania, the grouping, which consisted of the I Marconisti Battalion, V Telegraphers Battalion, and XXVI Engineer Battalion, participated in the Greco-Italian War. On 19 February 1941, the grouping was renamed 1st Engineer Grouping. In 1941, the grouping also received the XVII Pontieri Battalion, the XXX Sappers Battalion, and the III Workers Group. On 30 April 1942, the grouping was disbanded and its units transferred to the 4th Engineer Grouping, which had been formed by the 10th Engineer Regiment.

In June 1940, the I Mixed Engineer Battalion fought in the Italian invasion of France, while the CI Mixed Engineer Battalion fought in the Italian invasion of France and in the Tunisian campaign. The I Telegraphers Battalion was assigned to the 8th Army, which deployed in summer 1942 to the Eastern Front, where the army was destroyed during the Soviet Operation Little Saturn. In the evening of 8 September 1943, the Armistice of Cassibile, which ended hostilities between the Kingdom of Italy and the Anglo-American Allies, was announced by General Dwight D. Eisenhower on Radio Algiers and by Marshal Pietro Badoglio on Italian radio. Germany reacted by invading Italy and the 1st Engineer Regiment was disbanded soon thereafter by German forces. After the announcement of the armistice, the I Mixed Engineer Battalion, which was deployed with the 1st Alpine Division "Taurinense" in Montenegro, fought against Wehrmacht units attempting to disarm and disbanded the Italian units in Montenegro. On 2 December 1943, the remnants of the 1st Alpine Division "Taurinense", 19th Infantry Division "Venezia", and 155th Infantry Division "Emilia", were grouped together in the Division "Garibaldi", which continued the fight against the Germans on the side of Tito's National Liberation Army until the end of the war.

==== 1st Miners Regiment ====
On 28 October 1932, the Royal Italian Army disbanded the 2nd Radio-Telegraphers Regiment in Novi Ligure. On the same day, the personnel of the disbanded regiment's command and depot was used to form the command and depot of the newly formed 2nd Miners Regiment. The new regiment consisted of a command and three miners battalions, which were ceded by the 1st Engineer Regiment, 2nd Engineer Regiment, and 3rd Engineer Regiment.

In 1935-36, the regiment provided 46 officers and 912 enlisted to units deployed for the Second Italo-Ethiopian War. During World War II, the depot of the 1st Miners Regiment in Novi Ligure mobilized the I, II, III, IV, IX, XI, and CIII miners battalions, and the XV and XVI engineer battalions. The 1st Miners Regiment was disbanded by invading German forces after the announcement of the Armistice of Cassibile on 8 September 1943.

=== Cold War ===
On 1 March 1950, the Italian Army reformed the 1st Engineer Regiment in Civitavecchia. The regiment consisted of a command and two training battalions. In June 1951 one of the two training battalions was disbanded. The remaining training battalion trained the personnel destined to serve with the Engineer Battalion "Friuli" and Engineer Battalion "Granatieri di Sardegna". On 1 April 1954, the 1st Engineer Regiment was renamed 1st Engineer Grouping and moved from Civitavecchia to Trento, where it was assigned to the IV Army Corps. The grouping consisted of the IV, VII, and XX engineer battalions, the 1st and 2nd cableway companies, and a depot. On 1 April 1955, the 1st Engineer Grouping was renamed 1st Engineer Regiment. On 7 May 1955, the regiment received the 1st Photo-Electricians Company from the 5th Engineer Regiment. On 1 July 1955, the IV Engineer Battalion was transferred to the 2nd Engineer Regiment. At the end of 1955, the regiment consisted of the following units:

- 1st Engineer Regiment, in Trento
  - Command Platoon, in Trento
  - VII Engineer Battalion, in Riva del Garda
  - XX Engineer Battalion, in Trento
  - 1st Cableway Company, in Trento
  - 2nd Cableway Company, in Trento
  - 1st Mechanics-Electricians Company, in Trento
  - 1st Photo-Electricians Company

On 1 January 1964, the XX Engineer Battalion was renamed XIV Army Corps Engineer Battalion, and on 16 January of the same year, the 2nd Cableway Company was merged into the 1st Cableway Company. On the same day, the 1st Mechanics-Electricians Company, 1st Photo-Electricians Company and the 2nd Engineer Regiment's 1st Camouflage Company were merged and formed the Mixed Photo-Electricians-Camouflage Company. On 29 February 1964, the 1st Engineer Regiment was disbanded and the next day the regiment's remaining units joined the 2nd Engineer Regiment.

During the 1975 army reform the Italian Army disbanded the regimental level and newly independent battalions were granted for the first time their own flags. During the reform engineer battalions were named for a lake, if they supported an corps-level command, or a river, if they supported a division or brigade. On 31 December 1975, the 5th Engineer Regiment in Udine was disbanded. The next day, on 1 January 1976, the disbanded regiment's I Miners Battalion and V Army Corps Engineer Battalion became autonomous units. On the same day, the V Army Corps Engineer Battalion was renamed 5th Engineer Battalion "Bolsena", while the I Miners Battalion was renamed 1st Miners Battalion "Garda". The battalion was named for the great pre-alpine Lake Garda, which lies between Lombardy, Veneto and Trentin. The battalion was assigned, together with the 3rd Sappers Battalion "Verbano" and the 5th Engineer Battalion "Bolsena", to the 5th Army Corps' Engineer Command. After the reform the 1st Miners Battalion "Garda" consisted of a command, a command and park company, and three miners companies. At the time the 1st Miners Engineer Battalion "Garda" fielded 753 men (38 officers, 95 non-commissioned officers, and 620 soldiers).

On 12 November 1976, the President of the Italian Republic Giovanni Leone assigned with decree 846 the flag and traditions of the 1st Engineer Regiment and the traditions of the 1st Miners Regiment to the battalion.

For its conduct and work after the 1976 Friuli earthquake the battalion was awarded a Silver Medal of Army Valor, which was affixed to the battalion's flag and added to the battalion's coat of arms. In 1986, the Command and Park Company split into the Command and Services Company and the Special Equipment Company. Afterwards the battalion consisted of the following units:

- 1st Miners Battalion "Garda", in Udine
  - Command and Services Company
  - 1st Miners Company
  - 2nd Miners Company
  - 3rd Miners Company
  - Special Equipment Company

=== Recent times ===
On 31 March 1991, the 1st Miners Battalion "Garda" was disbanded and the following 8 May the flag of the 1st Engineer Regiment was transferred to the Shrine of the Flags in the Vittoriano in Rome for safekeeping.

On 3 October 1993, 4th Engineer Battalion "Orta" in Trento lost its autonomy and the next day the battalion entered the reformed 1st Pioneer Regiment as Pioneer Battalion "Orta". As the flag of the 1st Engineer Regiment was still in the Shrine of the Flags in the Vittoriano in Rome, the 1st Pioneer Regiment continued to use temporarily the flag of the 4th Engineer Regiment.

On 13 October 1995, the 2nd Sappers Battalion "Iseo" in Bolzano was disbanded. On the same day, the flag of the 2nd Engineer Regiment, which had been assigned in 1975 to the 2nd Miners Battalion "Iseo", was transferred from Bolzano to Trento, where, upon the arrival of the flag, the 1st Pioneer Regiment was renamed 2nd Engineer Regiment, while the regiment's Pioneer Battalion "Orta" was renamed Sappers Battalion "Iseo". Afterwards, the flag of the 4th Engineer Regiment was transferred from Trento to Palermo, where it arrived and was assigned to the 4th Pioneer Regiment on 24 October 1995.
