= Gestione Governativa Navigazione Laghi =

Public water transportation company for Italian lakes Maggiore, Garda, and Como

- Gestione Governativa Navigazione Laghi
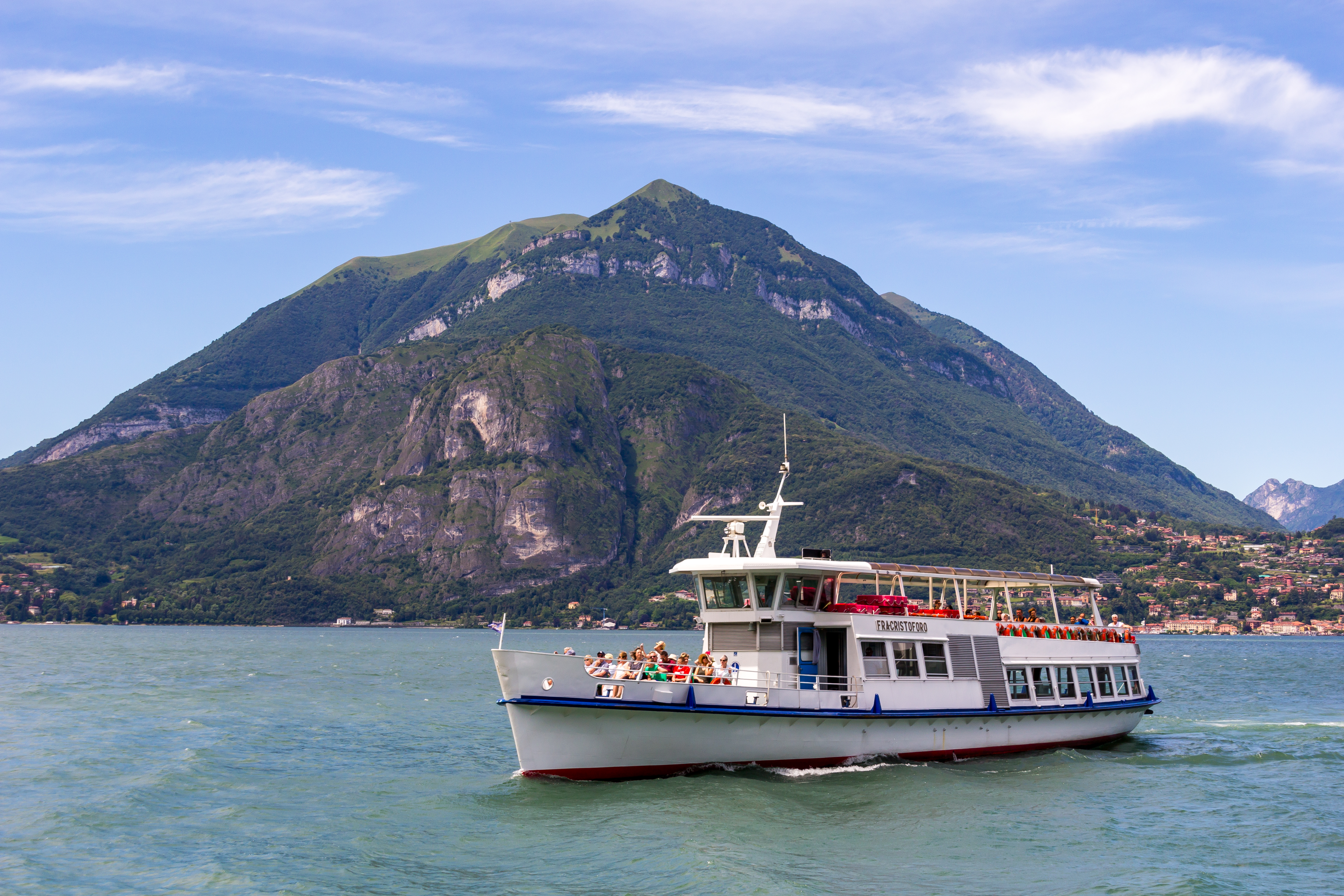

Agency overview
- Formed: 29 July 1957
- Jurisdiction: Government of Italy
- Headquarters: Via Lodovico Ariosto, 21, Milan, Italy
- Employees: ~650 (as of 2022)
- Minister responsible: Matteo Salvini (as of 2025), Minister of Infrastructure and Transport
- Agency executive: Pietro Marrapodi, Direttore Generale (General Director)
- Parent agency: Ministry of Infrastructure and Transport
- Website: www.navigazionelaghi.it

Footnotes
- Commonly known as Navigazione Laghi.

Gestione Governativa Navigazione Laghi (lit. 'Governmental Management of Navigation of the Lakes'), commonly known as Navigazione Laghi, is an Italian public body responsible for providing scheduled public boat transport services on Lake Maggiore (Lago Maggiore), Lake Garda (Lago di Garda), and Lake Como (Lago di Como), mostly in Italy but also in Switzerland. It operates under the supervision of the Ministry of Infrastructure and Transport. Its headquarters are located in Milan.

== History ==
Regular steamship services on the major Italian lakes began in the early 19th century, typically operated by private companies, sometimes with government subsidies. After periods of disruption and varying management structures, particularly following World War II, the Italian government moved to consolidate and directly manage these essential services.

The Gestione Governativa Navigazione Laghi was officially established by Law No. 614 of 29 July 1957. This law transferred the assets and responsibilities for navigation services on Lakes Maggiore, Garda, and Como from previous operators to the new governmental management entity, placed under the then Ministry of Transport. The primary aim was to ensure the continuity and efficiency of public transport on these vital lakes, supporting both local communities and the growing tourism sector. Since its inception, Navigazione Laghi has remained the primary operator of scheduled public water transport on these three lakes.

== Organization and Governance ==
Navigazione Laghi is classified as a non-economic public body (ente pubblico non economico) under Italian law. It is overseen by the Ministry of Infrastructure and Transport, which sets general policy directions and oversees its operations. Day-to-day management is handled by a General Director. As of 2022, the organization employed approximately 650 people across its operations on the three lakes.

== Services and Operations ==
Navigazione Laghi provides year-round scheduled services connecting the numerous towns and villages along the shores of lakes Maggiore (both Italian and Swiss basins), Garda, and Como. These services are crucial for local mobility, commuting, and student transport, as well as being fundamental to the region's tourism industry.

The company operates different types of services tailored to varying needs:

- **Slow Boat Services (Battelli or Motonavi):** Standard passenger ferries making frequent stops, connecting most lakeside towns. These are often used for sightseeing as well as transport.
- **Fast Services (Servizi Rapidi):** Utilizing hydrofoils (aliscafi) and catamarans, these services connect major towns more quickly with fewer stops, often requiring a supplemental fare.
- **Car Ferries (Traghetti):** On specific routes, particularly across the central parts of Lake Como and Lake Maggiore, and between Torri del Benaco and Maderno on Lake Garda, Navigazione Laghi operates ferries capable of transporting vehicles alongside passengers.

The network encompasses over 100 official stopovers (piers) across the three lakes. In 2023, the company ferried a historic record of 12 million passengers across the three lakes.

== Fleet ==
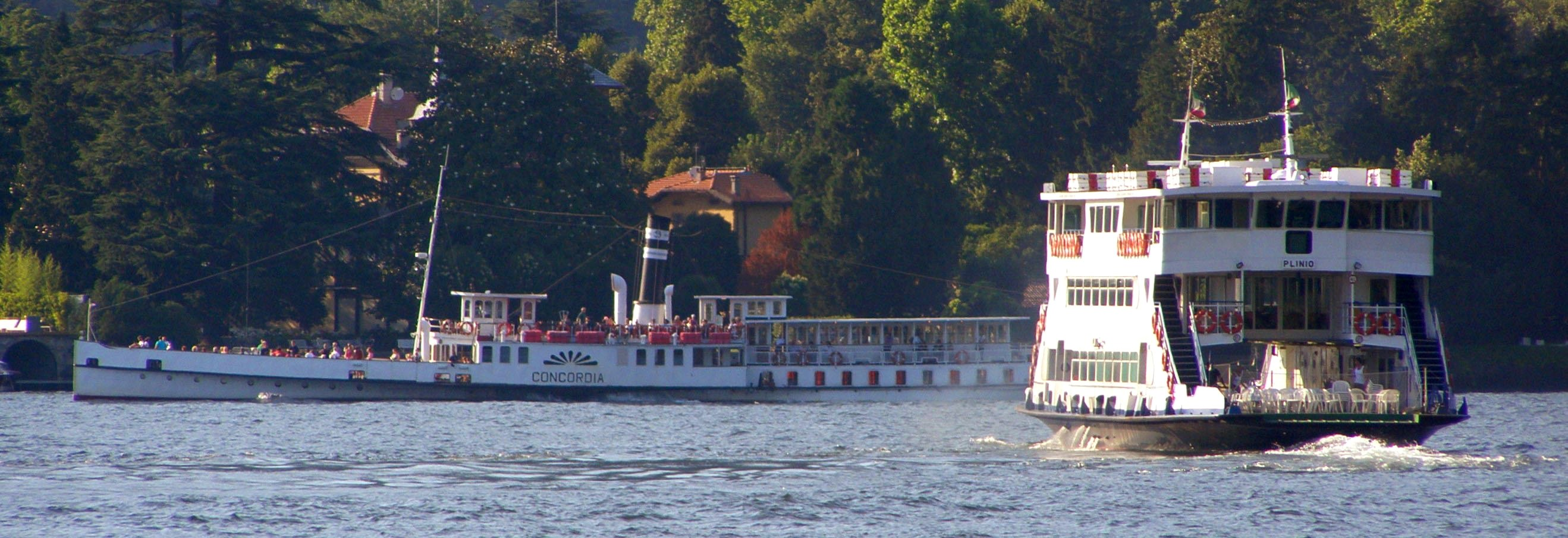
Navigazione Laghi vessels at Bellagio, Lake Como: the historic paddle steamer Concordia (left) and the car ferry Plinio (right).

Navigazione Laghi operates a large and diverse fleet across the three lakes, tailored to the different service types and lake conditions. As of mid-2023, the approximate fleet size was:

- Lake Como: ~34 vessels
- Lake Garda: ~28 vessels
- Lake Maggiore: ~35 vessels

The fleet includes modern monohull ferries, catamarans, hydrofoils for fast services, large car ferries, and several historic vessels, including paddle steamers like the Piemonte (1904) on Lake Maggiore and the Concordia (1926) on Lake Como, which are often used for tourist excursions and charters.
