= 2nd Alpine Signal Regiment =

Active Italian Army mountain signal unit

- 2° Reggimento Trasmissioni Alpino
- Regimental coat of arms
- Active: 16 Nov. 1926 – 28 Oct. 1932; 1 Oct. 1975 – today
- Country: Italy
- Branch: Italian Army
- Role: Military signals
- Part of: Signal Command
- Garrison/HQ: Bolzano
- Motto: "Sempre in più vasti spazi"
- Anniversaries: 20 June 1918 – Second Battle of the Piave River
- Decorations: 1× Silver Medal of Military Valor^{*} 1× Bronze Medal of Military Valor^{*} 1× Gold Cross of Army Merit * temporarily assigned

Insignia
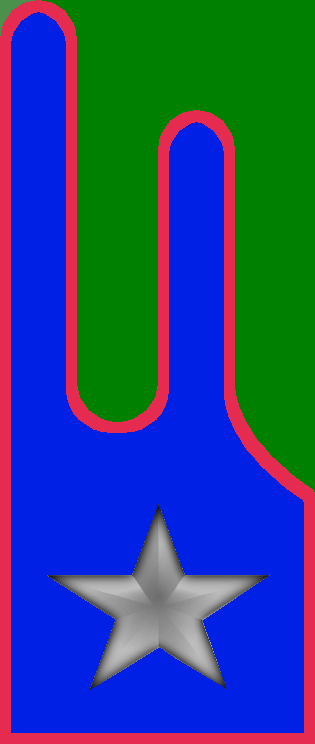
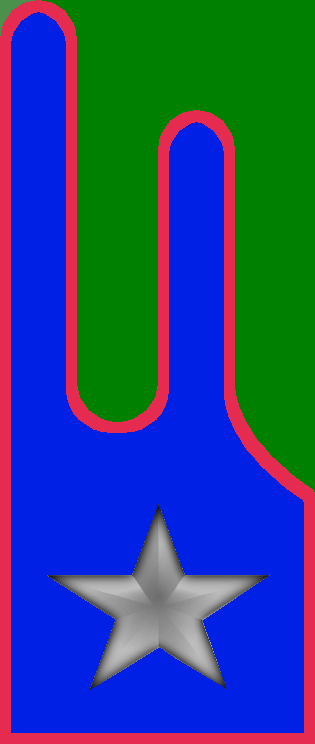
- Alpine Signallers gorget patches

The 2nd Alpine Signal Regiment (Italian: 2° Reggimento Trasmissioni Alpino) is an expeditionary signals regiment of the Italian Army based in Bolzano in South Tyrol that specializes in mountain warfare. Since 1951, the unit has been assigned of the 4th Alpine Army Corps and has therefore a strong association with the Italian Army's mountain infantry speciality, the Alpini, with whom the regiment shares the distinctive Cappello Alpino. The unit was first active from 1926 to 1932 as 2nd Radio-Telegraphers Regiment.

In 1952, the unit was reformed as a battalion and given the number IV, which had been used by two signal battalions during World War II. During the Cold War the battalion was assigned to the IV Army Corps. In 1975, the battalion was named for the Gardena Pass and assigned the flag and traditions of the 2nd Radio-Telegraphers Regiment. In 1992, the battalion lost its autonomy and entered the reformed 2nd Signal Regiment. In 2001, the regiment reformed the Signal Battalion "Pordoi" as its second signal battalion. The regiment is assigned to the army's Signal Command and affiliated with the Alpine Troops Command. The regiment's anniversary falls, as for all signal units, on 20 June 1918, the day the Austro-Hungarian Army began its retreat across the Piave river during the Second Battle of the Piave River.

== History ==
On 15 November 1926, the Radio-Telegraphers Engineer Regiment in Rome ceded its II Battalion, IV Battalion, and V Battalion to form the next day, on 16 November 1926, the 2nd Radio-Telegraphers Regiment in Florence. On the same day, the Radio-Telegraphers Engineer Regiment was renamed 1st Radio-Telegraphers Regiment. The 2nd Radio-Telegraphers Regiment then formed two new battalions and consisted afterwards of a command in Florence, the I, III, and V battalions in Milan, the II Battalion in Mestre, the IV Battalion in Alessandria, a depot in Florence, and two branch depots in Piacenza and Mantua. Each of the five battalions consisted of two companies. In 1930, the regiment moved from Florence to Novi Ligure.

On 28 October 1932, both radio-telegraphers regiments were disbanded and the units of the 2nd Radio-Telegraphers Regiment were distributed among the Royal Italian Army's engineer regiments as follows:

- I Battalion assigned to the 2nd Engineer Regiment, in Casale Monferrato
- II Battalion assigned to the 3rd Engineer Regiment, in Pavia
- III Battalion assigned to the 1st Engineer Regiment, in Vercelli
- 7th Company/ IV Battalion assigned to the 4th Engineer Regiment, in Verona
- 8th Company/ IV Battalion assigned to the 5th Engineer Regiment, in Trieste
- V Battalion assigned to the 11th Engineer Regiment, in Udine

On the same day, 28 October 1932, the personnel of the command and depot of the 2nd Radio-Telegraphers Regiment were used to form the command and depot of the newly formed 1st Miners Regiment.

=== Cold War ===
On 20 August 1951, the IV Connections Battalion was formed in Bolzano as support unit of the IV Territorial Military Command. Due to its number the battalion became the spiritual successor of the IV Telegraphers Battalion, which had been formed by the 10th Engineer Regiment during World War II, and also of the IV Army Connections Battalion, which had been formed by the 5th Engineer Regiment during the same conflict. On 1 May 1952, the battalion was transferred to the reformed IV Army Corps. On 1 October 1952, the Connections Speciality became an autonomous speciality of the Engineer Arm, with its own school and gorget patches. On 16 May 1953, the speciality adopted the name Signal Speciality and consequently, on 1 June 1953, the IV Connections Battalion was renamed IV Signal Battalion. In January 1954, the battalion was renamed IV Army Corps Signal Battalion and consisted of a command, the 1st Operations Company, the 2nd Line Construction Company, and a signals center. In 1967, the battalion formed the 3rd Line Construction Company. On 1 January 1969, the battalion formed a command and services platoon.

During the 1975 army reform the army disbanded the regimental level and newly independent battalions were granted for the first time their own flags. During the reform signal battalions were renamed for mountain passes. On 1 October 1975, the IV Army Corps Signal Battalion was renamed 4th Signal Battalion "Gardena". The battalion was named for the Gardena Pass, which connects the Val Gardena valley and Val Badia valley in South Tyrol. After the reform the 4th Signal Battalion "Gardena" consisted of a command, a command and services platoon, three signal companies, and a repairs and recovery platoon.

On 12 November 1976, the President of the Italian Republic Giovanni Leone assigned with decree 846 the flag and traditions of the 2nd Radio-Telegraphers Regiment to the battalion.

On 22 January 1976, the battalion's troops received the Cappello Alpino. In 1978, the battalion was ordered to form a fourth signal company, but due to a lack of lodgings the company was only activated and staffed in December 1984.

=== 7th Signal Company ===
On 1 February 1949, the VII Connections Battalion was formed in Rovezzano as support unit of the VII Territorial Military Command in Florence. The battalion consisted of command, a command company, a connections operations company, a line construction company, and the 7th Territorial Connections Company, which had been transferred to the new battalion from the VII Territorial Military Command. On 15 February 1954, the battalion was renamed VII Army Corps Signal Battalion and consisted of a command, an operations company, a line construction company, a signals center and the 7th Territorial Signal Company.

On 1 October 1957, the 7th Territorial Signal Company was transferred to the newly formed XLIII Signal Battalion. In October 1959, the battalion moved from Rovezzano to Paluzza in Friuli, where it joined the 5th Army Corps. On 1 March 1960, the VII Army Corps Signal Battalion was assigned to the Carnia-Cadore Troops Command, a division level command consisting of the Alpine Brigade "Cadore" and Alpine Brigade "Julia". The Carnia-Cadore Troops Command was part of the IV Army Corps and tasked with the defense of the Italian border in the Cadore region and along the Carnic Alps.

In 1962, the battalion moved to Bassano del Grappa. On 1 November 1969, the battalion was reorganized and consisted afterwards of a command, a command and services platoon, two active signal companies, and a reserve signal company.

In June 1975, the Carnia-Cadore Troops Command was disbanded and the VII Army Corps Signal Battalion was transferred to the IV Army Corps. On 31 August 1976, the battalion was disbanded and the next day the battalion's personnel was used to form the 7th Signal Company, which consisted of a command, a command and services platoon, and three radio relay platoons. On the same day, on 1 September 1976, the company, which remained in Bassano del Grappa, was assigned as an autonomous company to the 4th Alpine Army Corps.

=== Recent times ===
On 27 August 1992, the 4th Signal Battalion "Gardena" lost its autonomy and the next day the battalion entered the reformed 2nd Signal Regiment as Signal Battalion "Gardena". On the same day, the flag and traditions of the 2nd Radio-Telegraphers Regiment were transferred from the battalion to the 2nd Signal Regiment. Also on the same day, the 7th Signal Company in Bassano del Grappa lost its autonomy and entered the Signal Battalion "Gardena" as 2nd Radio Relay Company. On 28 February 1999, the 2nd Radio Relay Company in Bassano del Grappa was disbanded.

On 1 June 1999, the Signal Speciality left the Italian Army's Engineer Arm and was elevated to Signal Arm. On 10 February 2000, the regiment was assigned to the army's C4 IEW Command. On 26 September 2001, the regiment reformed Signal Battalion "Pordoi" as its second signal battalion. Since then the regiment is an expeditionary signal regiment capable to deploy and operate outside Italy. On 1 January 2009, the regiment was renamed 2nd Alpine Signal Regiment.

== Organization ==
As of 2024 the 2nd Alpine Signal Regiment is organized as follows:

- 2nd Alpine Signal Regiment, in Bolzano
  - Command and Logistic Support Company
  - Signal Battalion "Gardena"
    - 1st Signal Company
    - 2nd Signal Company
    - 3rd Signal Company
  - Signal Battalion "Pordoi"
    - 4th Signal Company
    - 5th Signal Company
    - 6th Signal Company

== Military honors ==
The Silver Medal of Military Valor and Bronze Medal of Military Valor affixed to the regiment's flag were awarded during World War II to the III Mixed Engineer Battalion of the 3rd Alpine Division "Julia": the Silver Medal for the battalion's conduct during the Italian campaign on the Eastern Front and the Bronze Medal for the battalion's conduct during the Greco-Italian War. Both medals were assigned temporarily to the regiment and therefore are not depicted on the regiment's coat of arms. In case the III Mixed Engineer Battalion should be reactivated the two medals would be returned to the battalion and affixed to the battalion's flag.
