= 3rd Engineer Regiment (Italy) =

Active Italian Army combat engineer unit

- 3° Reggimento Genio Guastatori
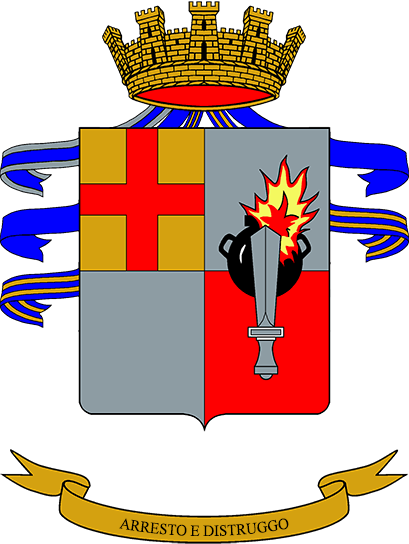
- Regimental coat of arms
- Active: 1 Nov. 1926 — 8 Sept. 1943; 1 April 1955 — today
- Country: Italy
- Branch: Italian Army
- Role: Combat engineers
- Part of: Cavalry Brigade "Pozzuolo del Friuli"
- Garrison/HQ: Udine
- Motto: "Arresto e distruggo"
- Anniversaries: 24 June 1918 - Second Battle of the Piave River
- Decorations: 1× Silver Medal of Military Valor; 2× Bronze Medals of Military Valor; 1× Silver Medal of Army Valor; 1× Bronze Medal of Army Valor; 1× Gold Cross of Army Merit

Insignia
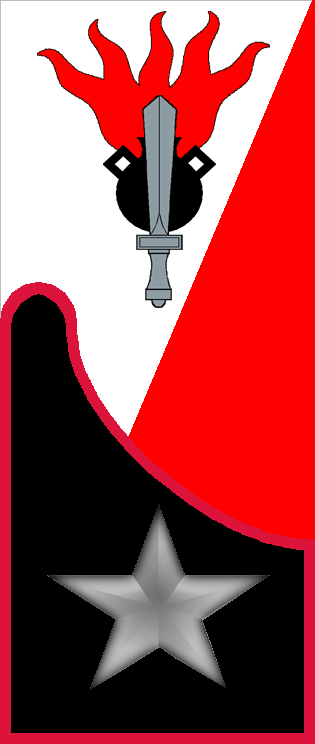
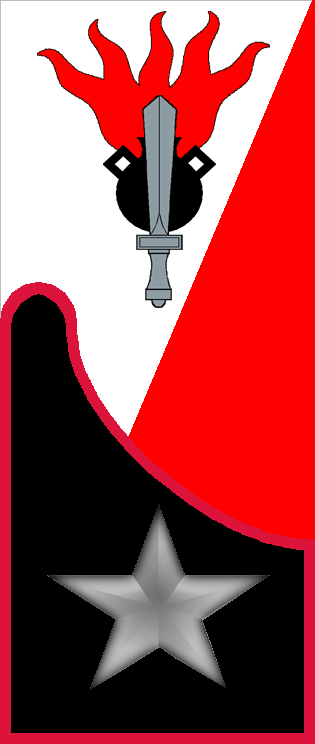
- Sappers gorget patches

The 3rd Engineer Regiment (Italian: 3° Reggimento Genio Guastatori) is a military engineering regiment of the Italian Army based in Udine in Friuli-Venezia Giulia. The regiment is the engineer unit of the Cavalry Brigade "Pozzuolo del Friuli". In 1926, the Royal Italian Army formed the 3rd Engineer Regiment in Lodi. During the Second Italo-Ethiopian War and World War II the regiment's depot formed engineer battalions and smaller units, which deployed with divisions and corps to the fronts of the war. After the announcement of the Armistice of Cassibile on 8 September 1943 the regiment was disbanded by invading German forces.

In 1954, the unit was reformed as 3rd Engineer Grouping and assigned to the V Army Corps. In 1955, the grouping was renamed 3rd Pioneers Fortification Regiment. In 1975, the regiment was disbanded and the regiment's XXXI Sappers Fortification Battalion became an autonomous unit, which was renamed 3rd Sappers Battalion "Verbano". After the regiment was disbanded, the flag and traditions of the 3rd Engineer Regiment were transferred to the 3rd Sappers Battalion "Verbano". The battalion was based in Udine and assigned to the 5th Army Corps's Engineer Command. In 1991, the battalion lost its autonomy and entered the reformed 3rd Engineer Regiment. In 2000, the 3rd Engineer Regiment was assigned to the Cavalry Brigade "Pozzuolo del Friuli". The regiment's anniversary falls, as for all engineer units, on 24 June 1918, the last day of the Second Battle of the Piave River.

== History ==
On 1 November 1883, the Royal Italian Army formed the 3rd Engineer Regiment, which, on 1 November 1895, was renamed 3rd Engineer Regiment (Telegraphers). After the end of World War I the Royal Italian Army reorganized its forces and on 31 March 1920, the 3rd Engineer Regiment (Telegraphers) was disbanded. In 1975, the traditions of the 3rd Engineer Regiment (Telegraphers) were assigned to the 10th Signal Battalion "Lanciano", which in 1993 entered the 3rd Signal Regiment. Since then the traditions of the 3rd Engineer Regiment (Telegraphers) are perpetuated by the 3rd Signal Regiment.

=== Interwar years ===
On 1 October 1922, the Royal Italian Army formed the 2nd Army Corps Engineer Grouping in Lodi. The grouping received a Sappers Battalion and a Telegraphers Battalion, which had been formed on 1 April 1920 for the III Army Corps. On the same date, 1 October 1922, the III Army Corps was renumbered as II Army Corps. The grouping also received a miners company from the disbanded Miners Engineer Regiment. After its formation the grouping consisted of a command, a sappers-miners battalion, a telegraphers battalion, which included three dovecotes located in Aosta, Brescia, and Milan, a photo-electricians company, and a depot.

In 1923, the grouping moved from Lodi to Pavia. In 1926, the IIArmy Corps was renumbered as III Army Corps and consequently, on 1 November 1926, the grouping was renamed 3rd Engineer Regiment. During the same year the dovecote in Aosta was transferred to the 1st Engineer Regiment. AS replacement the regiment received a dovecote in Piacenza from the 7th Engineer Regiment. The regiment's 1st Company had already been active during the Sardinian campaign in central and southern Italy, during which the company distinguished itself on 14 September 1860 in the capture of Perugia and was awarded a Bronze Medal of Military Valor. Upon the arrival of the 3rd Engineer Regiment's flag, the company's Bronze Medal of Military Valor was affixed to the regiment's flag. On 1 February 1931, the regiment formed a Miners-Cableway Battalion, which was transferred on 28 October 1932 to the newly formed 1st Miners Regiment in Novi Ligure. On the same date, the regiment received the II Radio-Telegraphers Battalion of the disbanded 2nd Radio-Telegraphers Regiment.

On 1 October 1934, the regiment merged with the Engineer Arm's Complementary Officer Cadets School and was renamed 3rd Engineer School Regiment. On the same day, the regiment transferred the radio-telegraphers battalion to the 4th Engineer Regiment. Afterwards the regiment consisted of a command, a cadets battalion, a mixed engineer battalion (with sappers, engineer, cableway, and photo-electricians companies), a teleradio battalion, the two dovecotes, and a depot.

In 1935, the regiment mobilized a water company, four water platoons, an engineer company for CC.NN. division, and a firefighters platoon for the Second Italo-Ethiopian War. In January 1937, the telegraphers and radio-telegraphers battalions were renamed connections battalions. On 15 September 1937, the regiment was split and the 3rd Engineer Regiment and the Complementary Officer Cadets School of the Engineer Arm were both reformed as separate units. At the time, the 3rd Engineer Regiment consisted of a command, a sappers-engineer battalion, a connections battalion, a mixed engineer battalion for motorized division, two dovecotes, and a depot.

=== World War II ===
During World War II the regiment's depot in Pavia mobilized the following units:

- Command of the 2nd Special Army Engineer Grouping
- II Army Mixed Engineer Battalion
- III Cableway Battalion
- IV Engineer Battalion
- VIII Mixed Connections Battalion
- X Engineer Battalion
- XXXIII Mixed Engineer Battalion (for the 133rd Armored Division "Littorio")
- LII Mixed Engineer Battalion (for the 101st Motorized Division "Trieste")
- CXXXIV Mixed Engineer Battalion (for the 134th Armored Division "Emanuele Filiberto Testa di Ferro"; in June 1943 renamed CXXXV Mixed Engineer Battalion and assigned to the 135th Armored Cavalry Division "Ariete")
- 7th, 8th, 31st, and 37th mobile dovecotes
- and many smaller units

The 2nd Special Army Engineer Grouping fought in the Western Desert campaign and the following Tunisian campaign. In 1942, the grouping consisted of the IV and XV telegraphers battalions, VII and XI Marconisti battalions, and the dovecote center in Tripoli. On 13 May 1943, the grouping surrendered with the remaining Axis forces in Tunisia and was declared lost due to wartime events. The X Engineer Battalion fought in the Greco-Italian War, while the II Army Mixed Engineer Battalion and LII Mixed Engineer Battalion fought in the Western Desert campaign. The IV Engineer Battalion and VIII Mixed Connections Battalion fought on the Eastern Front. In the evening of 8 September 1943, the Armistice of Cassibile, which ended hostilities between the Kingdom of Italy and the Anglo-American Allies, was announced by General Dwight D. Eisenhower on Radio Algiers and by Marshal Pietro Badoglio on Italian radio. Germany reacted by invading Italy and the CXXXV Mixed Engineer Battalion fought in the defense of Rome against the invading German forces. In the evening of 10 September 1943, the Italian units defending Rome surrendered and the Germans disbanded the Italian units. The Germans also disbanded the 3rd Engineer Regiment and the regiment's depot in Pavia after the announcement of the armistice.

=== Cold War ===
At the beginning of the Cold War the Italian Army formed five pioneers fortification battalions, which were tasked with emplacing minefields to block likely Warsaw Pact invasion routes and tasked with manning reactivated Alpine Wall fortifications guarding these minefields. Each battalion consisted of a command, a command platoon, and two pioneers companies. The battalions were assigned to the Italian Army's two frontline corps in the following manner:

- V Army Corps Engineer Command, in Vittorio Veneto
  - I Pioneers Fortification Battalion, in Casarsa della Delizia — formed on 1 September 1950, moved to Orcenico Superiore in 1951
  - II Pioneers Fortification Battalion, in Conegliano — formed on 1 May 1951
  - III Pioneers Fortification Battalion, in Latisana — formed on 1 May 1951
- IV Army Corps Engineer Command, in Bolzano
  - IV Pioneers Fortification Battalion, in Bolzano — formed on 1 September 1953
  - V Pioneers Fortification Battalion, in Sterzing — formed on 20 January 1954

On 1 April 1954, the 3rd Engineer Grouping was formed in Conegliano. The grouping was assigned to the V Army Corps and took command of the I, II, and III pioneers fortification battalions. On 1 July 1954, the V Pioneers Fortification Battalion moved from Sterzing to Orcenico Superiore and joined the 3rd Engineer Grouping. On 1 April 1955, the grouping was renamed 3rd Pioneers Fortification Regiment and assigned the flag and traditions of the 3rd Engineer Regiment. During the same year the regiment moved from Conegliano to Orcenico Superiore and formed a mechanics-electricians company and a water company. On 31 March 1964, the V Pioneers Fortification Battalion, the Mechanics-electricians Company, and the Water Company were disbanded.

By 1972, the regiment and its three battalions were all based in Orcenico Superiore. On 30 September 1972, the I Pioneers Fortification Battalion was disbanded, and the next day, on 1 October 1972, the 3rd Pioneers Fortification Regiment was renamed 3rd Sappers Fortification Regiment. Alson on the same day, the II and III pioneers fortification battalions were renamed XXX Sappers Fortification Battalion respectively XXXI Sappers Fortification Battalion. Both battalions commemorated sappers battalions active during World War II: on 15 March 1941, the XXX Sappers Battalion was formed with the 5th, 6th, and 9th sappers companies, while on 18 April 1941, the XXXI Sappers Battalion was formed with the 1st, 2nd, 7th, and 8th sappers companies. On 15 August 1941, the XXXII Sappers Battalion was formed in North Africa with the 3rd Sappers Company and the 4th Sappers Company, which had been fighting in the Western Desert campaign since January 1941. The nine sappers companies were trained to assault fortified positions. Each company consisted of four assault platoons of 41 men per platoon. Each assault platoon consisted of two sapper teams, which were equipped with Model 38 submachine guns, hand grenades, and bangalore torpedoes, and two support teams, which were equipped with heavy machine guns and light mortars. All three battalions distinguished themselves during the war:

- the XXX Sappers Battalion fought in the Greco-Italian War and then on the Eastern Front. The battalion was nearly wiped out during the Soviet Operation Little Saturn. Only 121 men out of 480 survived. For its conduct and sacrifice on the Eastern Front the XXX Sappers Battalion was awarded a Silver Medal of Military Valor.
- the XXXI Sappers Battalion fought in the Western Desert campaign and Tunisian campaign. The battalion was nearly wiped out during the Second Battle of El Alamein, where only some 300 men out of 1,300 managed to escape the British advance. On 13 May 1943, the battalion's remnants surrendered to allied forces at the end of the Tunisian campaign. For its conduct and sacrifice in North Africa the XXXI Sappers Battalion was awarded a Silver Medal of Military Valor and a Bronze Medal of Military Valor.
- the XXXII Sappers Battalion fought in the Western Desert campaign. The battalion was disbanded after the First Battle of El Alamein, during which it was nearly wiped out. The 72 survivors were assigned to the XXXI Sappers Battalion. For its conduct and sacrifice in North Africa the XXXII Sappers Battalion was awarded a Bronze Medal of Military Valor.

During the 1975 army reform the army disbanded the regimental level and newly independent battalions were granted for the first time their own flags. During the reform engineer battalions were named for a lake, if they supported an corps-level command, or a river, if they supported a division or brigade. On 30 September 1975, the XXX Sappers Fortification Battalion was disbanded. On 31 December 1975, the 3rd Sappers Fortification Regiment was disbanded, and the next day, on 1 January 1976, the XXXI Sappers Fortification Battalion became autonomous units and was renamed 3rd Sappers Battalion "Verbano". The battalion was named for the great pre-alpine Lake Maggiore, which is also known as Lake Verbano, and lies between in Piedmont and Lombardy. After the reform the 3rd Sappers Battalion "Verbano" consisted of a command, a command and park company, and three sappers companies. The three companies were numbered 30th Sappers Company, 31st Sappers Company, and 32nd Sappers Company. At the time the battalion fielded 830 men (35 officers, 97 non-commissioned officers, and 698 soldiers).

On 12 November 1976, the President of the Italian Republic Giovanni Leone assigned with decree 846 the flag and traditions of the 3rd Engineer Regiment to the battalion. As part of the reform the battalion received the two Silver Medals of Military Valor and the two Bronze Medals of Military Valor, which had been awarded to the XXX, XXXI and XXXII sappers battalions for their service during World War II. The medals were affixed to the battalion's flag and added to the battalion's coat of arms.

For its conduct and work after the 1976 Friuli earthquake the battalion was awarded a Bronze Medal of Army Valor, which was affixed to the battalion's flag and added to the battalion's coat of arms. Due to the damage the battalion's base in Orcenico Superiore had suffered in the earthquake the battalion moved on 26 July 1976 to Udine.

In 1988, the Command and Park Company split into the Command and Services Company and the Special Equipment Company. Afterwards the battalion consisted of the following units:

- 3rd Sappers Battalion "Verbano", in Udine
  - Command and Services Company
  - 30th Sappers Company
  - 31st Sappers Company
  - 32nd Sappers Company
  - Special Equipment Company

=== Recent times ===
On 31 August 1991, the 3rd Sappers Battalion "Verbano" lost its autonomy and the next day the battalion entered the reformed 3rd Sappers Regiment. On the same day, the flag and traditions of the 3rd Engineer Regiment were transferred from the battalion to the 3rd Sappers Regiment.

On 1 December 2000, the 3rd Engineer Regiment joined the Cavalry Brigade "Pozzuolo del Friuli". On 1 September 2002, the Italian Army formed the 32nd Engineer Battalion in Ozzano dell'Emilia. The battalion, which inherited the traditions of the XXXII Sappers Battalion, was assigned to the Alpine Brigade "Taurinense". On 28 May 2004, the President of the Italian Republic Carlo Azeglio Ciampi granted the battalion a flag. On 29 September 2004, the 32nd Engineer Battalion lost its autonomy and the next day the battalion entered the newly formed 32nd Engineer Regiment as XXX Sappers Battalion, thus unifying the traditions of the XXX Sappers Battalion and XXXII Sappers Battalion. Consequently, the Silver Medal of Military Valor and Bronze Medal of Military Valor, which were awarded to the two battalions during World War II, were transferred from the flag of the 3rd Engineer Regiment to the flag of the new regiment. The two medals were also added to the new regiment's coat of arms. Since then the 3rd Engineer Regiment only perpetuates the traditions of the XXXI Sappers Battalion.

In 2004, the 3rd Engineer Regiment deployed to Iraq as part of the Multi-National Force – Iraq. On 5 and 6 August 2004, forces of Muqtada al-Sadr's Mahdi Army fought units of the Cavalry Brigade "Pozzuolo del Friuli" for control of the three main bridges over the Euphrates river in Nasiriyah. The 3rd Engineer Regiment, together with troops of the Lagunari Regiment "Serenissima", defeated the insurgents' attacks. For its conduct in the two day battle the regiment was awarded a Silver Medal of Army Valor, which was affixed to the regiment's flag and added to the regiment's coat of arms. From November 2006 to April 2007, the regiment deployed to Lebanon as part of the UN's United Nations Interim Force in Lebanon. For its service in Lebanon the regiment was awarded a Gold Cross of Army Merit, which was affixed to the regiment's flag.

== Organization ==
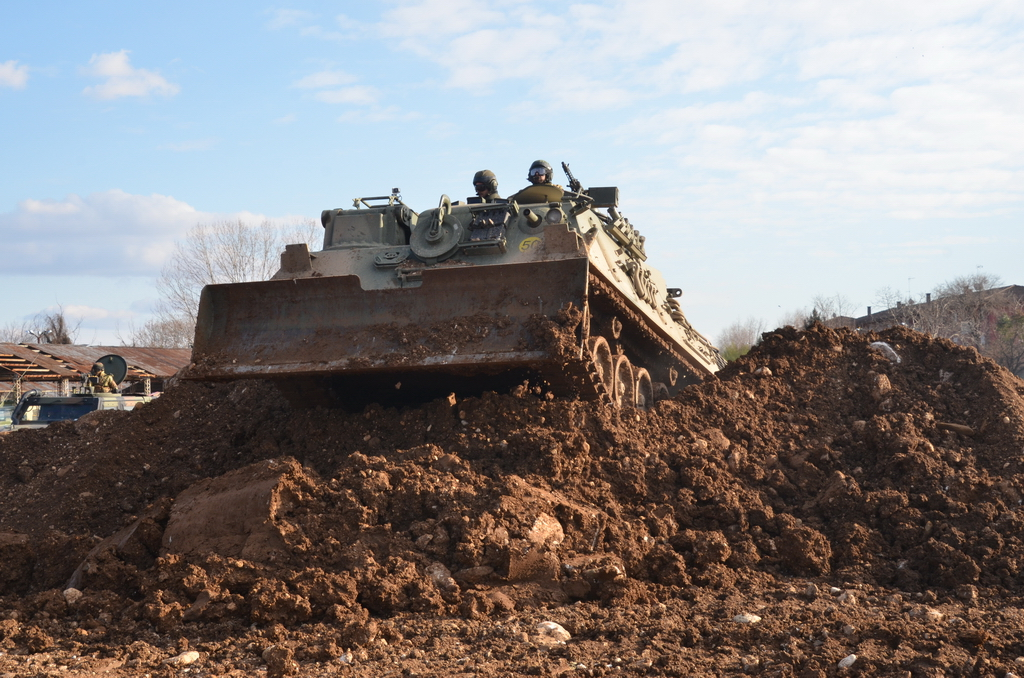
3rd Engineer Regiment Dachs armored engineer vehicle

As of 2024 the 3rd Engineer Regiment is organized as follows:

- 3rd Engineer Regiment, in Udine
  - 5th Command and Logistic Support Company
  - Sappers Battalion "Verbano"
    - 8th Deployment Support Company
    - 30th Sappers Company
    - 31st Amphibious Sappers Company
    - 32nd Amphibious Sappers Company

== See also ==
- Cavalry Brigade "Pozzuolo del Friuli"
