= Trentini =

Trentini is an Italian surname. Notable people with the surname include:

- Caroline Trentini (born 1987), Brazilian fashion model
- Emma Trentini (1878–1959), Italian opera singer
- Mauro Trentini (born 1975), Italian cyclist
- Peggy Trentini (born 1968), American actress and model

== See also ==
- Trentin
