= Trentin =

Trentin is a surname. Notable people with the surname include:

- Guido Trentin (born 1975), Italian cyclist
- Matteo Trentin (born 1989), Italian cyclist
- Nicola Trentin (born 1974), Italian long jumper
- Pierre Trentin (born 1944), French cyclist
- Bruno Trentin (born 1926), Italian politician

== See also ==
- Trentini, a surname
