= 5th Engineer Regiment (Italy) =

Active Italian Army combat engineer unit

- 5° Reggimento Genio Guastatori
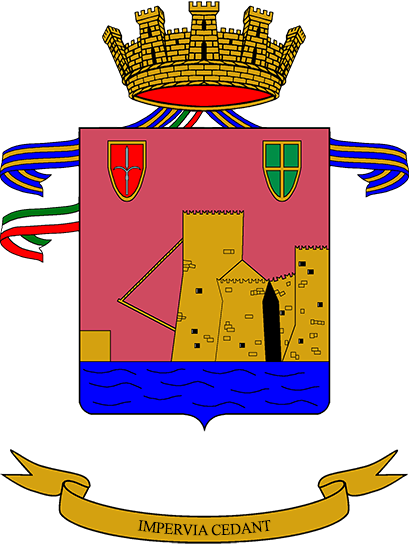
- Regimental coat of arms
- Active: 1 Nov. 1895 — 8 Sept. 1943; 5 Jan. 1951 — 1 June 2001; 1 Jan. 2003 — today
- Country: Italy
- Branch: Italian Army
- Role: Combat engineers
- Part of: Mechanized Brigade "Sassari"
- Garrison/HQ: Macomer
- Motto: "Impervia cedant"
- Anniversaries: 24 June 1918 - Second Battle of the Piave River
- Decorations: 2× Bronze Medals of Army Valor; 1× Bronze Medal of Civil Valor

Insignia
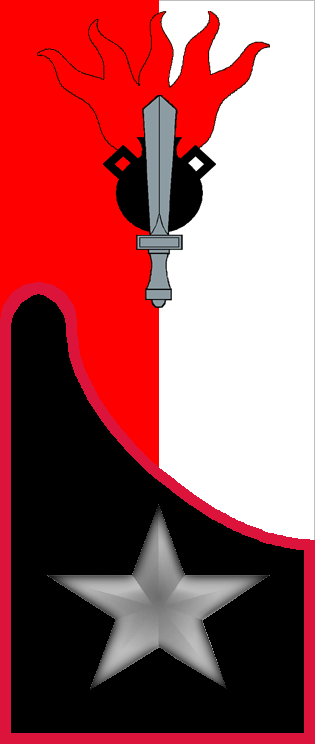
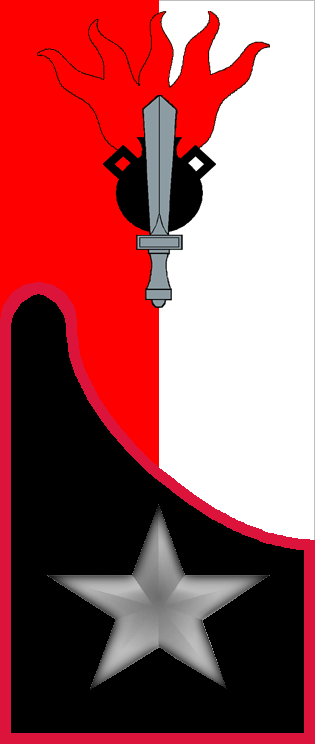
- Sappers gorget patches

The 5th Engineer Regiment (Italian: 5° Reggimento Genio Guastatori) is a military engineering regiment of the Italian Army based in Macomer in Sardinia. The regiment is the engineer unit of the Mechanized Brigade "Sassari". In 1895, the Royal Italian Army formed the 5th Engineer Regiment. During World War I the regiment formed battalions and companies, which operated along the Italian Front. In 1919, the regiment was renamed Miners Engineer Regiment. In 1922, the regiment was disbanded and its companies distributed among the army's ten army corps engineer groupings. In November 1926, the regiment was reformed by renaming the 5th Army Corps Engineer Grouping in Trieste. During the Second Italo-Ethiopian War and World War II the regiment's depot formed engineer battalions and smaller units, which deployed with divisions and corps to the fronts of the war. After the announcement of the Armistice of Cassibile on 8 September 1943 the regiment was disbanded by invading German forces.

In 1951, the regiment was reformed and assigned to the V Army Corps. On 31 December 1975, the regiment was disbanded and its flag and traditions assigned to the 5th Engineer Battalion "Bolsena". In December 2000, the battalion was reorganized as 5th Paratroopers Engineer Battalion "Bolsena" and assigned to the Paratroopers Brigade "Folgore". In June 2001, the battalion was renamed to 8th Paratroopers Sappers Battalion and the flag of the 5th Engineer Regiment was transferred to the Shrine of the Flags in the Vittoriano in Rome for safekeeping. At the end of 2002, the 45th Infantry Regiment "Reggio" in Sardinia was disbanded and the next day the disbanded regiment's personnel and materiel were used to reform the 5th Engineer Regiment. The regiment's anniversary falls, as for all engineer units, on 24 June 1918, the last day of the Second Battle of the Piave River.

== History ==
On 1 November 1895, the Royal Italian Army formed the 5th Engineer Regiment (Miners) in Rivoli. The new regiment received six sappers companies ceded by the 1st Engineer Regiment (Sappers), six sappers companies ceded by 2nd Engineer Regiment (Sappers), and a train company ceded by the 3rd Engineer Regiment (Telegraphers). The new regiment consisted of a staff, four brigades of three miners companies each, a train company, and a depot. In 1896 the regiment moved from Rivoli to Turin. In 1895–96, the regiment provided nine officers and 266 enlisted to augment units deployed to Italian Eritrea for the First Italo-Ethiopian War. In 1910, the brigades were renamed battalions. In 1911-12, the regiment's 7th, 8th, and 9th miners companies were deployed to Libya for the Italo-Turkish War. The regiment also provided 29 troops to augment other engineer units, which were deployed for the war.

=== World War I ===
In May 1915, shortly before Italy's entry into World War I the regiment consisted of 21 miners companies, which were attached to armies and army corps along the Italian Front. During the war the regiment's depot in Turin continued to form battalions and companies, which operated in all sectors of the Italian Front. In total the regiment formed the commands of nine miners battalions and 53 miners companies. The regiment also formed autonomous cableway, motorists, and water companies and platoons, and two territorial militia companies.

=== Interwar years ===
On 21 November 1919, the regiment was renamed Miners Engineer Regiment. At the time the regiment consisted of a command, five battalions, and a depot. On 1 May 1920, the regiment moved from Turin to Verona. On 30 September 1922, the Miners Engineer Regiment was disbanded and the next day, on 1 October 1922, the regiment's companies were assigned to the ten newly formed army corps engineer groupings. On the same day, 1 October 1922, the 5th Army Corps Engineer Grouping was formed in Trieste. The grouping received a Sappers Battalion and a Telegraphers Battalion, which had been formed on 1 April 1920 for the V Army Corps. The grouping also received the 8th Miners Company from the disbanded Miners Engineer Regiment. After its formation the grouping consisted of a command, a sappers-miners battalion based in Pula, a telegraphers battalion, which included four dovecotes located in Trieste, Pula, Udine, and Gorizia, a photo-electricians company, and a depot. On 16 October 1926, the grouping was renamed 5th Engineer Regiment. The new regiment also included a newly formed Cableway Battalion and a dovecote in Tolmin. In February 1928, the 5th Engineer Regiment ceded its cableway battalion, a sappers-miners company, a telegraphers company, and the dovecotes in Udine and Gorizia, to help form the 11th Engineer Regiment in Treviso.

On 7 March 1932, the regiment formed a Miners-Cableway Battalion, which was transferred on 28 October 1932 to the newly formed 2nd Miners Regiment in Verona. On the same date, the regiment received the 8th Company/ IV Battalion of the disbanded 2nd Radio-Telegraphers Regiment. On 29 September 1936, the regiment expanded its radio-telegraphers company to battalion. At the end of the same year, the regiment consisted of a command, an engineer battalion, a telegraphers battalion, a radio-telegraphers battalion, three dovecotes, and a depot. In 1935-36, the regiment provided nine officers and 380 enlisted to units deployed for the Second Italo-Ethiopian War. In January 1937, the telegraphers and radio-telegraphers battalions were renamed connections battalions.

=== World War II ===
During World War II the regiment's depot in Trieste mobilized the following units:

- III Engineer Battalion
- IV Mixed Connections Battalion
- XXXII Sappers Battalion
- LVII Mixed Engineer Battalion (for the 4th Infantry Division "Livorno")
- and many smaller units

The IV Mixed Connections Battalion and XXXII Sappers Battalion fought in the Western Desert campaign, while the LVII Mixed Engineer Battalion in the Sicilian campaign. In the evening of 8 September 1943, the Armistice of Cassibile, which ended hostilities between the Kingdom of Italy and the Anglo-American Allies, was announced by General Dwight D. Eisenhower on Radio Algiers and by Marshal Pietro Badoglio on Italian radio. Germany reacted by invading Italy and the 5th Engineer Regiment was disbanded soon thereafter by German forces.

=== Cold War ===
On 5 January 1951, the Italian Army reformed the 5th Engineer Regiment in Belluno. The regiment consisted of a command, a training battalion, and the V Engineer Battalion. The training battalion trained the personnel destined to serve with the Engineer Battalion "Folgore", Engineer Battalion "Mantova", Engineer Company "Ariete", and Engineer Company "Julia". During the same year the battalion moved from Belluno to Vicenza and was assigned to the V Army Corps.

On 1 March 1953, the regiment formed the 1st and 2nd photo-electricians companies, and the 1st and 2nd camouflage companies. On 1 April 1954, the regiment was renamed 5th Engineer Grouping. The grouping consisted of a command, the V Army Corps Engineer Battalion, the 1st and 2nd photo-electricians companies, the 1st and 2nd camouflage companies, and the I and IV miners battalions, which were both based in Udine. On 1 January 1955, the grouping moved from Vicenza to Udine and on 1 April of the same year, the grouping was renamed 5th Engineer Regiment. On 7 May 1955, the regiment transferred the 1st Photo-Electricians Company to the 1st Engineer Regiment and the 1st Camouflage Company to the 2nd Engineer Regiment. For its work after the 1966 Venice flood the regiment was awarded a Bronze Medal of Civil Valor, which was affixed to the regiment's flag and added to the regiment's coat of arms. On 1 June 1974, the 2nd Photo-Electricians Company and 2nd Camouflage Company were disbanded, while the IV Miners Battalion was reduced to a reserve unit on 6 November of the same year.

During the 1975 army reform the army disbanded the regimental level and newly independent battalions were granted for the first time their own flags. During the reform engineer battalions were named for a lake, if they supported an corps-level command, or a river, if they supported a division or brigade. On 1 June 1975, the IV Miners Battalion was disbanded, followed on 31 December 1975, by the 5th Engineer Regiment. The next day, on 1 January 1976, the disbanded regiment's I Miners Battalion and V Army Corps Engineer Battalion became autonomous units. On the same day, the I Miners Battalion was renamed 1st Miners Battalion "Garda", while the V Army Corps Engineer Battalion was renamed 5th Engineer Battalion "Bolsena". The battalion was named for the volcanic crater Lake Bolsena, which is located in Lazio. The battalion was assigned, together with the 1st Miners Battalion "Garda" and the 3rd Sappers Battalion "Verbano", to the 5th Army Corps' Engineer Command. After the reform the 5th Engineer Battalion "Bolsena" consisted of a command, a command and park company, and three engineer companies. At the time the battalion fielded 756 men (38 officers, 98 non-commissioned officers, and 620 soldiers).

On 12 November 1976, the President of the Italian Republic Giovanni Leone assigned with decree 846 the flag and traditions of the 5th Engineer Regiment to the battalion.

For its conduct and work after the 1976 Friuli earthquake the battalion was awarded a Bronze Medal of Army Valor, which was affixed to the battalion's flag and added to the battalion's coat of arms. After the 1980 Irpinia earthquake, the battalion was deployed to southern Italy for the rescue efforts. For its conduct and work in southern Italy the battalion was awarded a second Bronze Medal of Army Valor, which was affixed to the battalion's flag and added to the battalion's coat of arms. On 15 July 1987, the Command and Park Company split into the Command and Services Company and the Special Equipment Company. Afterwards the battalion consisted of the following units

- 5th Engineer Battalion "Bolsena", in Udine
  - Command and Services Company
  - 1st Engineer Company
  - 2nd Engineer Company
  - 3rd Engineer Company
  - Special Equipment Company

=== Recent times ===
On 31 March 1991, the 9th Heavy Field Artillery Group "Foggia" in Foggia was disbanded and over the next weeks the companies of the 5th Engineer Battalion "Bolsena" moved from Udine into the disbanded group's base in Foggia. On 1 May 1991, the 5th Engineer Battalion "Bolsena" completed its move to the South of Italy and was assigned to the Southern Military Region. On 31 August 1995, 1st Pontieri Engineer Battalion in Legnano and the 5th Engineer Battalion "Bolsena" in Foggia were disbanded. The next day, on 1 September 1995, the 5th Engineer Battalion "Bolsena" was reformed in Legnano with the personnel and materiel of the disbanded 1st Pontieri Engineer Battalion. The reformed battalion was assigned to the Northeastern Military Region.

On 1 December 1997, the battalion was transferred from the Northeastern Military Region to the newly formed Engineer Grouping. On 1 December 2000, the 5th Engineer Battalion "Bolsena" was reorganized as an airborne unit and renamed 5th Paratroopers Engineer Battalion "Bolsena". On the same day, the battalion was transferred from the Engineer Grouping to the Paratroopers Brigade "Folgore". On 31 May 2001, the 5th Paratroopers Engineer Battalion "Bolsena" was disbanded and the next day the battalion's personnel and materiel were used to reform the 8th Paratroopers Sappers Battalion. The reformed battalion received the flag of the 8th Engineer Regiment, while the flag of the 5th Engineer Regiment was transferred to the Shrine of the Flags in the Vittoriano in Rome for safekeeping.

On 31 December 2002, the 45th Regiment "Reggio" in Macomer in Sardinia was disbanded and the next day, on 1 January 2003, the 5th Engineer Regiment was reformed with the personnel and materiel of the disbanded regiment.

== Organization ==
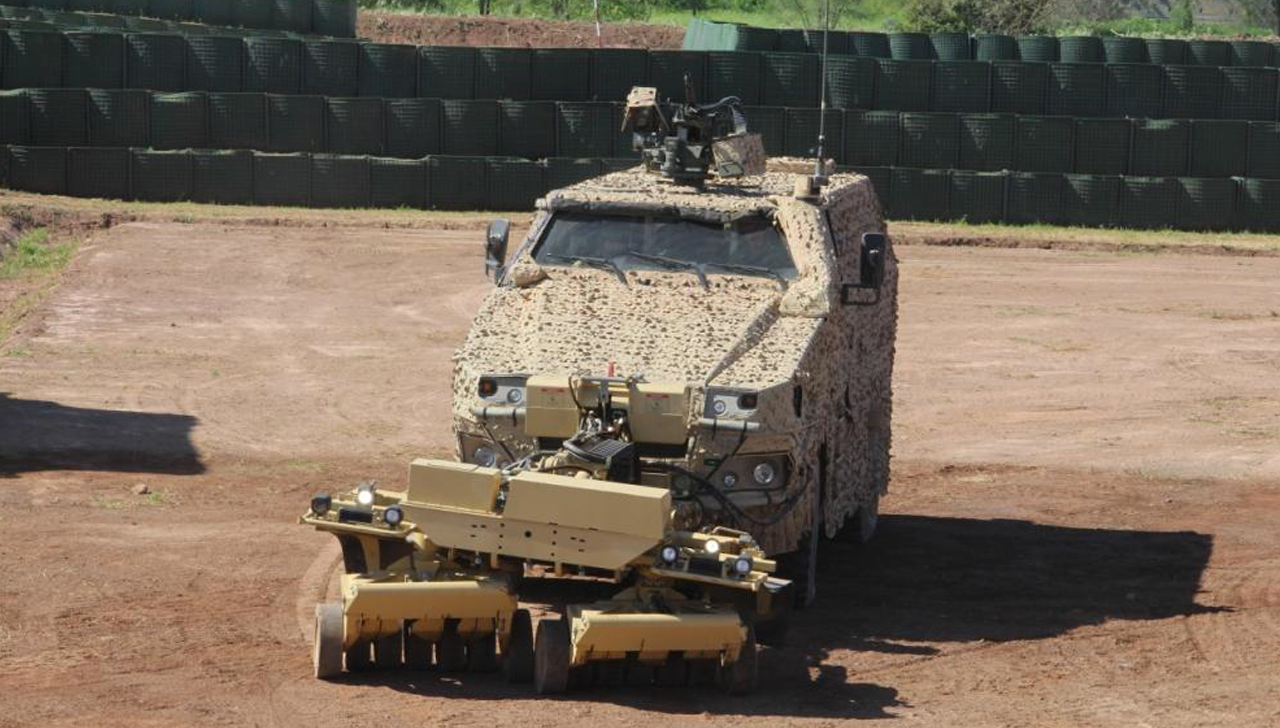
A VTMM "Orso" Route Clearing vehicle of the Italian engineer corps

As of 2024 the 5th Engineer Regiment is organized as follows:

- 5th Engineer Regiment, in Macomer
  - Command and Logistic Support Company
  - Sappers Battalion "Bolsena"
    - 1st Sappers Company
    - 2nd Sappers Company
    - 3rd Sappers Company
    - Deployment Support Company

== See also ==
- Mechanized Brigade "Sassari"
