= Italian occupation of Adalia =

Post-WWI period in Turkey (1919–1922)

The Italian occupation of Antalya, a city in Turkey, occurred in the turbulent times after the dismemberment of the Ottoman Empire that led to the Treaty of Sèvres (from 1919 to 1922).

== History ==
=== Background ===
In 1915, the Treaty of London was signed, in which Italy agreed to intervene on the side of the Allied powers of France, Britain and Russia, in exchange for Italy acquiring, in the case of a dismemberment of the Ottoman Empire, among other lands, the port of Antalya in Turkey and the contiguous territory, where a carboniferous basin was reported.

Map of the division of Turkish Anatolia after the Treaty of Sèvres (1920), where Antalya can be seen at the center of the Italian zone

With the Mudros Armistice (30 October 1918), the Ottoman Empire accepted the conditions unilaterally dictated by the winning powers; while in Italy, where the idea of a Vittoria mutilata was growing, it was feared that the clause of the Pact of London would be annulled.

=== Italian disembarkation in Anatolia ===
In these circumstances, 9 March 1919, the Italian government made an Italian expeditionary force in Anatolia disembark in Antalya, and in a brief time nearby localities were also occupied: Makri Budrun, Kuch-Adassi, Alanya, Konya, Ismidt and Eskişehir.

This show of force was met by a harsh opposition from the Greek government which also aspired to occupy a large territory of Anatolia. In the absence of the Italian delegation headed by the prime minister Orlando, at the Paris Peace Conference, Greece managed to obtain, from the Supreme Council, permission to intervene on the Aegean coast of western Anatolia. On 15 May 1919, therefore, the Greek Army made a landing at Smyrna with the occupation of Aydin, Magnesia, Kassaba, Kydonies and Edemieh.

A bitter dispute arose between the Italian and Greek governments, which was later resolved with a secret agreement signed on 29 July 1919 by Tittoni and Venizelos in which Italy renounced Antalya and the islands of Dodecanese except for Rhodes, in exchange for Greek support for an Italian “mandate” over Albania. This agreement, however, was denounced by the subsequent Italian foreign minister Carlo Sforza (June 1920).

The Paris Peace Conference, following the events of World War I, was articulated with a series of treaties with the individual defeated nations. The Ottoman Empire led to the Treaty of Sèvres (10 August 1920), which recognized Italy's area of influence on Antalya and its surroundings, as well as the possession of the Dodecanese, and the Greek occupation of Smyrna and its surroundings.

As the Greco-Turkish War spread, the Turkish revolutionaries obtained significant military assistance from Italy, which used the Antalya base to arm and train the troops of Mustafa Kemal Atatürk against the Greeks.

=== Treatment of Turkish civilians ===
Treatment of Turkish civilians by the Italian occupying troops and officers was mixed. There were reports that they were peaceful and kind, handing out Italian postcards and chocolates to Turkish children and even offering shelter to Turkish refugees fleeing the Greek occupation zone. However, on the other hand, a large number of reports and complaints had emerged of occupying Italian troops raping Turkish civilians. Other reports conclude that the behavior of Italian forces was mixed, varied depending on the circumstances, and was generally “arbitrary”.

=== Withdrawal ===
Italy began the withdrawal of its expeditionary forces in the autumn of 1922.

After the victorious war against the Greeks and the establishment of Mustafa Kemal Atatürk's Turkish Republic, the Treaty of Sèvres was annulled and replaced by the Treaty of Lausanne (1923). In this last act, Turkey confirmed to Italy the possession of the Dodecanese and recognized for the first time the Italian sovereignty over Libya, but did not grant it any area subject to economic influence or military occupation in Anatolia.

== Commanders of the Italian troops in Antalya ==
- Giuseppe Battistoni from 29 April 1919 to 24 July 1919
- Luigi Bongiovanni from 24 July 1919 to 17 August 1919
- Vittorio Elia from 17 August 1919 to 18 December 1919
- Achille Porta from 18 December 1919 to 7 August 1920
- Giorgio Fusoni from 7 August 1920 to 29 April 1922

== Bibliography ==
- Giovanni Cecini (2010). Il Corpo di Spedizione italiano in Anatolia (1919–1922). Rome: Ufficio USSME. ISBN 978-88-96260-15-9.
- Giovanni Cecini (2014). Militari italiani in Turchia (1919–1923). Rome: USSMD. ISBN 978-88-98185-01-6.

== See also ==
- Treaty of Sèvres
