= Italian Lakes =

Group of large lakes lying on the south side of the Alps

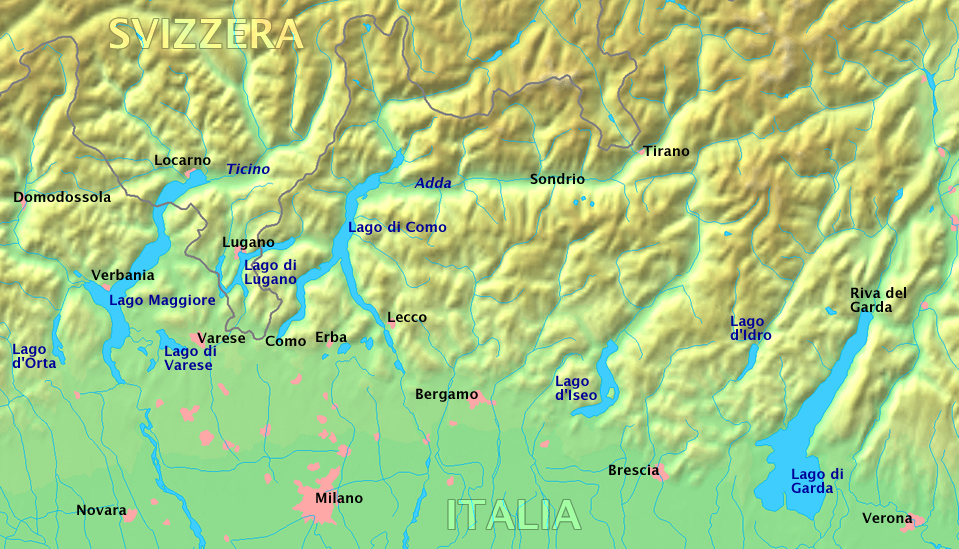
The Italian Lakes are located on the Alpine foothills and mark the transition between the Alps and the Po Plain

The Italian Lakes (Italian: Grandi laghi prealpini, lit. "great pre-alpine lakes") are a group of large lakes lying on the south side of the Alps, in the basin of the river Po and the Mediterranean Sea. As their name suggests, they are essentially located in northern Italy; however, they are also partly located in southern Switzerland. They are all glacial lakes that formed after the retreat of the glaciers at the end of the last ice age. The group is composed of (from west to east): Lake Orta, Lake Maggiore, Lake Varese, Lake Lugano, Lake Como, Lake Iseo, Lake Idro and Lake Garda. The three largest are all well over 100 km^{2}; they are: Lake Garda (largest in Italy), Lake Maggiore (largest in southern Switzerland) and Lake Como (deepest in Italy).

The lakes are located in the Italian regions of Piedmont, Lombardy, Veneto and Trentino-Alto Adige/Südtirol, and in the Swiss canton of Ticino. They are all located at least partly in Italy, while two of them (Maggiore and Lugano) are partly in Switzerland.

The Italian Lakes have constituted a popular tourist destination since the Roman Era for their mild climate and their views of the Alps. Gestione Governativa Navigazione Laghi (Navigazione Laghi) operates ship routes on lakes Maggiore, Garda and Como.

== Climate ==
At latitudes between 45° and 46° North and at elevations below 400 metres above sea level, the Italian Lakes enjoy a lot of sunshine and very mild weather. The region is known for its sub-Mediterranean climate, making it the warmest area of Switzerland and significantly warmer than most regions of northern Italy. There sub-tropical plants can grow all year round in the numerous gardens, notably those of the Borromean and Brissago Islands. During winter, the lakes help to maintain a higher temperature in the surrounding regions (since water releases heat energy more slowly than air) with snowfalls being erratic and primarily affecting the higher elevations around the lakes. Rainfall is lowest during the winter months and heaviest around summer, peaking in spring and autumn.

The particularly mild climate of the Italian Lakes favours the growth of some hardy Mediterranean plants, including the olive tree, parasol pine, Mediterranean cypress, Chinese windmill palm and Canary Island date palm. Lake Lugano (Gandria) is one of the few places in Switzerland where olives are grown. Some hardy citrus trees, such as hardy lemons and satsuma can also be found around Lake Garda, which are extremely rare at this latitude.

== See also ==
- List of lakes of Italy
- List of lakes of Switzerland
