= Outline of the Italian Army at the end of the Cold War =

Outliine of the Italian Army at the end of the Cold War

The following is a hierarchical outline for the Italian Army at the end of the Cold War. It is intended to convey the connections and relationships between units and formations.

This article is based on the 1984 publication of the Italian Army's order of battle by the Institute for Disarmament, Development and Peace (Istituto di ricerche per il disarmo, lo sviluppo e la pace (IRDISP) in Rome (a think tank of the Radical Party). The published order of battle, down to company level, can be found at the Radical's Radio's website (Link). The structure was then adapted with information from the Italian Army's website and its units' histories listed there. Additionally the following website was used, which lists every Order of Battle for Italy's armies from 1553 to 1997, Link. Specifically the Order of Battle after the 1986 reform was used, which was then corrected and expanded with the Italian Army's website information.

== Graphic of the Italian Army in 1989 ==
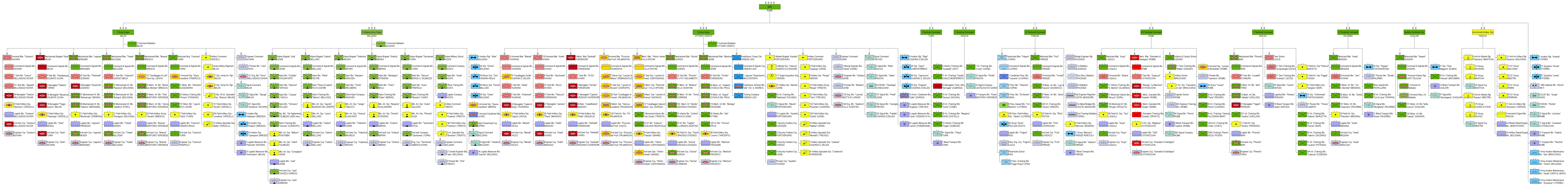
Structure of the Italian Army in 1989 (click image to enlarge)

== Army General Staff ==
The Army General Staff in Rome oversaw all Italian Army units. However, in the event of war the three Corps' in Northern Italy would have come under command of NATO's Allied Land Forces Southern Europe (LANDSOUTH) Command in Verona.

=== 3rd Army Corps ===
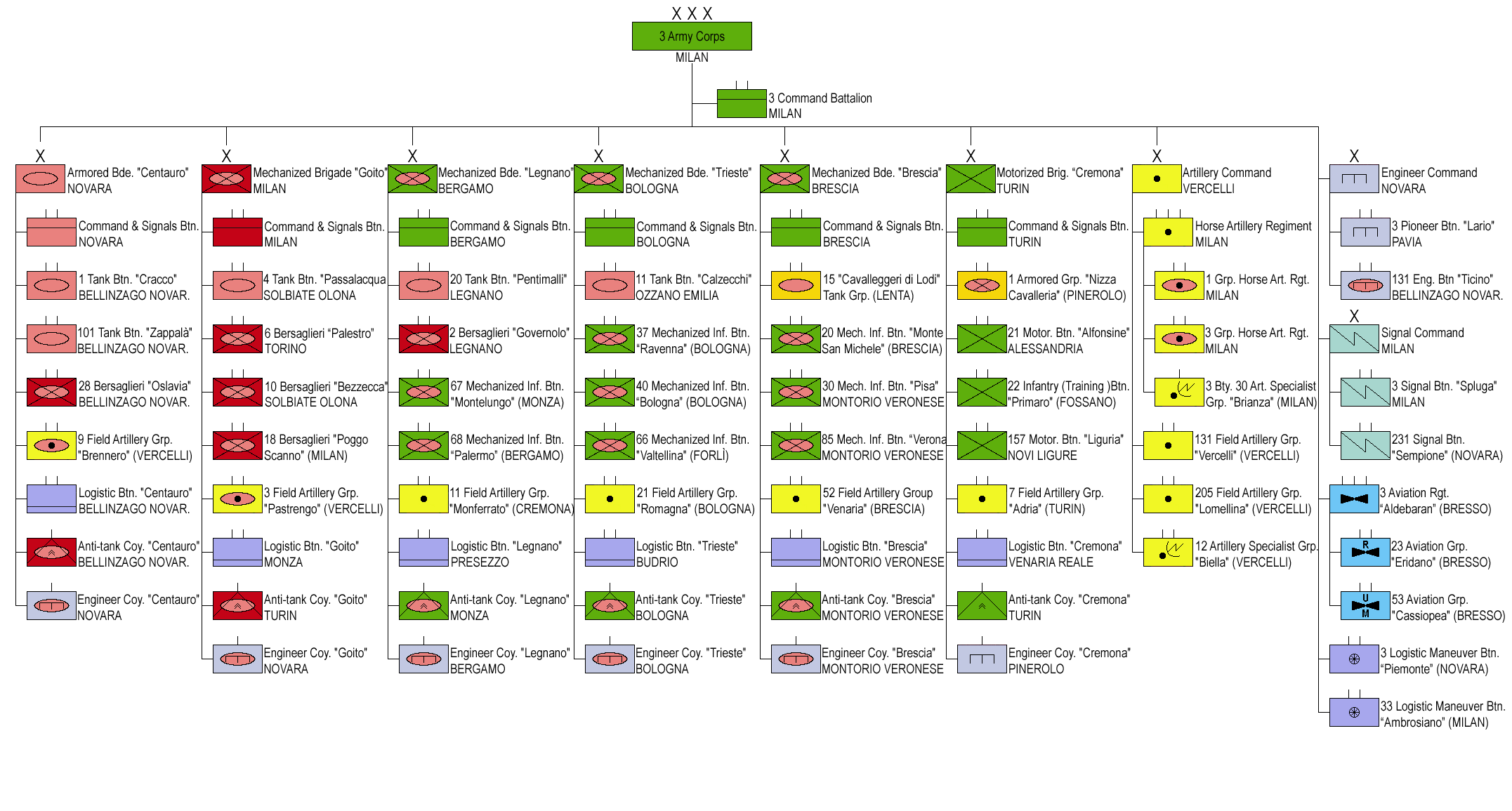
Structure of the 3rd Army Corps in 1989 (click image to enlarge)

- 3rd Army Corps, in Milan:
  - 3rd Army Corps Command Unit, in Milan
  - Artillery Command, in Vercelli
    - Horse Artillery Regiment, in Milan
      - Command Battery, in Milan
      - 1st Self-propelled Field Artillery Group "Gioacchino Bellezza", (M109 155 mm self-propelled howitzers), in Milan
      - 2nd Self-propelled Field Artillery Group "Sergio Bresciani", (M109 155 mm self-propelled howitzers), in Cremona
      - 3rd Heavy Field Artillery Group (Reserve), (M59 155/45 towed howitzers), in Cremona
      - 3rd Battery, 30th Artillery Specialists Group "Brianza", in Milan
    - 131st Heavy Field Artillery Group "Vercelli", in Vercelli, (FH70 155 mm towed howitzers)
    - 205th Heavy Field Artillery Group "Lomellina", in Vercelli, (FH70 155 mm towed howitzers)
    - 11th Light Anti-aircraft Artillery Group "Falco" (Reserve), in Vercelli
    - 12th Artillery Specialists Group "Biella", in Vercelli
    - 30th Artillery Specialist Group "Brianza" (Reserve), in Milan
  - Engineer Command, in Novara
    - 3rd Engineer Battalion "Lario", in Pavia
    - 131st Engineer Battalion "Ticino", in Bellinzago Novarese
  - Signal Command, in Milan
    - 3rd Signal Battalion "Spluga", in Milan
    - 231st Signal Battalion "Sempione", in Novara
  - Light Aviation Command, at Bresso Air Base
    - 23rd Recon Helicopters Squadrons Group "Eridano", at Bresso Air Base
      - 423rd Recon Helicopter Squadron (AB-206)
      - 461st Recon Helicopter Squadron (AB-206)
      - 462nd Recon Helicopter Squadron (AB-206)
    - 53rd Multirole Helicopters Squadrons Group "Cassiopea", at Bresso Air Base
      - 531st Multirole Helicopter Squadron (AB-205)
      - 532nd Multirole Helicopter Squadron (AB-205)
  - 33rd Maneuver Logistic Battalion "Ambrosiano", in Novara

==== Armored Brigade "Centauro" ====
- 31st Armored Brigade "Centauro", in Novara
  - Command and Signal Unit "Centauro", in Novara
  - 1st Tank Battalion "M.O. Cracco", in Bellinzago Novarese, (Leopard 1A2 main battle tanks)
  - 101st Tank Battalion "M.O. Zappalà", in Bellinzago Novarese, (Leopard 1A2 main battle tanks)
  - 28th Bersaglieri Battalion "Oslavia", in Bellinzago Novarese, (VCC-2 armored personnel carriers)
  - 9th Self-propelled Field Artillery Group "Brennero", in Vercelli, (M109 155 mm self-propelled howitzers)
  - Logistic Battalion "Centauro", in Bellinzago Novarese
  - Anti-tank Company "Centauro", in Bellinzago Novarese
  - Engineer Company "Centauro", in Novara

==== Mechanized Brigade "Goito" ====
- 3rd Mechanized Brigade "Goito" in Milan
  - Command and Signal Unit "Goito", in Milan
  - 4th Tank Battalion "M.O. Passalacqua", in Solbiate Olona, (Leopard 1A2 main battle tanks)
  - 6th Bersaglieri Battalion "Palestro", in Turin, (VCC-2 armored personnel carriers)
  - 10th Bersaglieri Battalion "Bezzecca", in Solbiate Olona, (VCC-2 armored personnel carriers)
  - 18th Bersaglieri Battalion "Poggio Scanno", in Milan, (VCC-2 armored personnel carriers)
  - 3rd Self-propelled Field Artillery Group "Pastrengo", in Vercelli, (M109 155 mm self-propelled howitzers)
  - Logistic Battalion "Goito", in Monza
  - Anti-tank Company "Goito", in Turin
  - Engineer Company "Goito", in Novara

==== Mechanized Brigade "Legnano" ====
- Mechanized Brigade "Legnano", in Bergamo
  - Command and Signal Unit "Legnano", in Bergamo
  - 20th Tank Battalion "M.O. Pentimalli", in Legnano, (Leopard 1A2 main battle tanks)
  - 2nd Bersaglieri Battalion "Governolo", in Legnano, (VCC-2 armored personnel carriers)
  - 67th Mechanized Infantry Battalion "Montelungo", in Monza, (M113 armored personnel carriers)
  - 68th Mechanized Infantry Battalion "Palermo", in Bergamo, (M113 armored personnel carriers, disbanded on 30 November 1989)
  - 11th Field Artillery Group "Monferrato", in Cremona, (M114 155 mm towed howitzers)
  - Logistic Battalion "Legnano", in Presezzo
  - Anti-tank Company "Legnano", in Monza
  - Engineer Company "Legnano", in Bergamo

==== Mechanized Brigade "Trieste" ====
- Mechanized Brigade "Trieste", in Bologna
  - Command and Signal Unit "Trieste", in Bologna
  - 11th Tank Battalion "M.O. Calzecchi", in Ozzano dell'Emilia, (Leopard 1A2 main battle tanks)
  - 37th Mechanized Infantry Battalion "Ravenna", in Bologna, (VCC-2 armored personnel carriers)
  - 40th Mechanized Infantry Battalion "Bologna", in Bologna, (VCC-2 armored personnel carriers)
  - 66th Mechanized Infantry Battalion "Valtellina", in Forlì, (VCC-2 armored personnel carriers)
  - 21st Field Artillery Group "Romagna", in Bologna, (M114 155 mm towed howitzers)
  - Logistic Battalion "Trieste", in Budrio
  - Anti-tank Company "Trieste", in Bologna
  - Engineer Company "Trieste", in Bologna

==== Mechanized Brigade "Brescia" ====
- Mechanized Brigade "Brescia", in Brescia
  - Command and Signal Unit "Brescia", in Brescia
  - 15th Tank Squadrons Group "Cavalleggeri di Lodi", in Lenta (Leopard 1A2 main battle tanks)
  - 20th Mechanized Infantry Battalion "Monte San Michele", in Brescia, (VCC-1 armored personnel carriers)
  - 30th Mechanized Infantry Battalion "Pisa", in Montorio Veronese, (VCC-1 armored personnel carriers)
  - 85th Mechanized Infantry Battalion "Verona", in Montorio Veronese, (VCC-1 armored personnel carriers, reduced to reserve unit on 30 November 1989)
  - 52nd Field Artillery Group "Venaria", in Brescia, (M114 155 mm towed howitzers)
  - Logistic Battalion "Brescia", in Montorio Veronese
  - Anti-tank Company "Brescia", in Montorio Veronese
  - Engineer Company "Brescia", in Montorio Veronese

==== Motorized Brigade "Cremona" ====
- Motorized Brigade "Cremona", in Turin
  - Command and Signal Unit "Cremona", in Turin
  - 1st Armored Squadrons Group "Nizza Cavalleria", in Pinerolo, (two Leopard 1A2 tank companies and one VCC-2 mech infantry company)
  - 21st Motorized Infantry Battalion "Alfonsine", in Alessandria
  - 22nd Infantry Battalion "Primaro" (Recruits Training), in Fossano
  - 157th Motorized Infantry Battalion "Liguria", in Novi Ligure
  - 7th Field Artillery Group "Adria", in Turin, (M114 155 mm towed howitzers)
  - Logistic Battalion "Cremona", in Venaria Reale
  - Anti-tank Company "Cremona", in Turin
  - Engineer Company "Cremona", in Pinerolo

=== 4th Army Corps ===
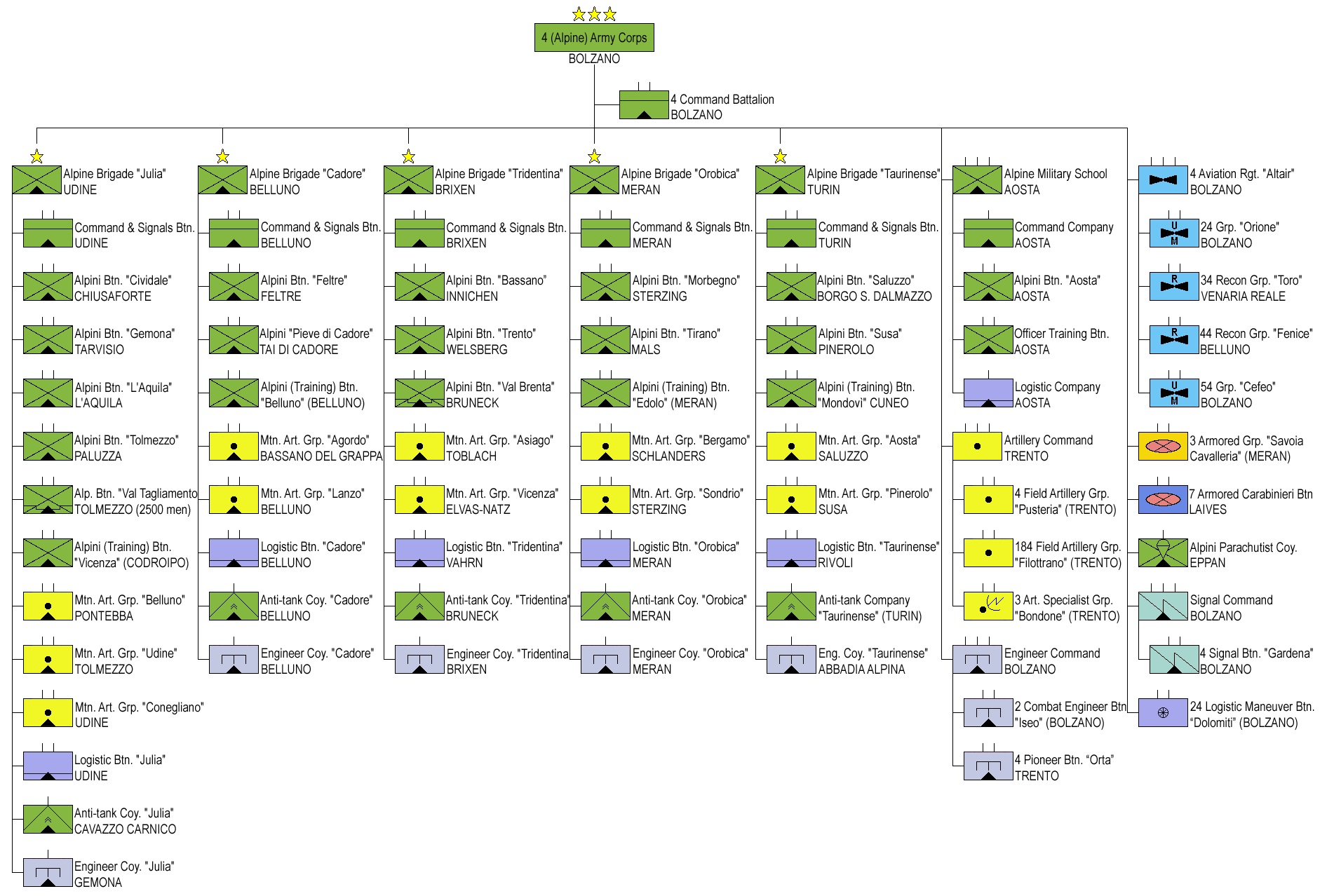
Structure of the 4th Army Corps in 1989 (click image to enlarge)

- 4th Alpine Army Corps, in Bolzano:
  - 4th Alpine Army Corps Command Unit, in Bolzano
  - Artillery Command, in Trento
    - 4th Heavy Field Artillery Group "Pusteria", in Trento, (FH70 155 mm towed howitzers)
    - 184th Heavy Field Artillery Group "Filottrano", in Trento, (FH70 155 mm towed howitzers)
    - 3rd Artillery Specialists Group "Bondone", in Trento
  - Engineer Command, in Bolzano
    - 2nd Mining Engineer Battalion "Iseo", in Bolzano
    - 4th Engineer Battalion "Orta", in Trento
  - Signal Command, in Bolzano
    - 4th Signal Battalion "Gardena", in Bolzano
    - 7th Signal Company, in Bassano del Grappa
  - 4th Army Aviation Regiment "Altair", at Bolzano-San Giacomo Air Base
    - 24th Army Aviation Squadrons Group "Orione", at Bolzano-San Giacomo Air Base (transformed in Support and Command Unit on 20 September 1989)
      - 241st Light Airplanes Squadron (SM-1019) (disbanded on 20 September 1989)
      - 440th Recon Helicopters Squadron (AB-206) (reassigned to the 54th Squadrons Group "Cefeo" on 20 September 1989)
    - 34th Army Air Aviation Squadrons Group "Toro", at Venaria Reale Air Base
      - 441st Recon Helicopters Squadron (AB-206)
      - 544th Multirole Helicopters Squadrons (AB-205)
    - 44th Recon Helicopters Squadrons Group "Fenice", at Belluno Air Base
      - 441st Recon Helicopters Squadron (AB-206)
      - 544th Multirole Helicopters Squadron (AB-205)
    - 54th Multirole Helicopters Squadrons Group "Cefeo", at Bolzano-San Giacomo Air Base
      - 541st Multirole Helicopters Squadrons (AB-205)
      - 542nd Multirole Helicopters Squadrons (AB-205)
      - 543rd Multirole Helicopters Squadrons (AB-205)
  - 3rd Armored Squadrons Group "Savoia Cavalleria", in Merano, (two Leopard 1A2 tank companies and one VCC-2 mech infantry company)
  - 24th Maneuver Logistic Battalion "Dolomiti", in Bolzano
  - 7th Armored Carabinieri Battalion "M.O. Petrucelli", in Laives, (one M47 Patton tank company, two M113 mech infantry companies and one M113/120mm heavy mortars company)
  - Alpini Paratroopers Company "Monte Cervino", in Eppan

==== Alpine Brigade "Taurinense" ====
- Alpine Brigade "Taurinense", in Turin
  - Command and Signal Unit "Taurinense", in Turin
  - Alpini Battalion "Saluzzo", in Borgo San Dalmazzo
  - Alpini Battalion "Susa"^{x}, in Pinerolo
  - Alpini Battalion "Mondovì" (Recruits Training), in Cuneo
  - Mountain Artillery Group "Aosta"^{x}, in Saluzzo, (M114 155 mm towed howitzers)
  - Mountain Artillery Group "Pinerolo", in Susa, (M56 105 mm pack howitzers)
  - Logistic Battalion "Taurinense"^{x}, in Rivoli
  - Anti-tank Company "Taurinense"^{x}, in Turin
  - Engineer Company "Taurinense", in Abbadia Alpina
  - Airmobile Medical Unit "Taurinense"^{x}, in Rivoli
- The units marked with an ^{x} were earmarked for the NATO Allied Mobile Force (Land) AMF(L)

==== Alpine Brigade "Orobica" ====
- Alpine Brigade "Orobica", in Merano
  - Command and Signal Unit "Orobica", in Merano
  - Alpini Battalion "Morbegno", in Sterzing
  - Alpini Battalion "Tirano", in Mals
  - Alpini Battalion "Edolo" (Recruits Training), in Merano
  - Mountain Artillery Group "Bergamo", in Schlanders, (M56 105 mm pack howitzers)
  - Mountain Artillery Group "Sondrio", in Sterzing, (M114 155 mm towed howitzers, disbanded 1989, howitzers reassigned to the "Bergamo" Group)
  - Logistic Battalion "Orobica", in Merano
  - Anti-tank Company "Orobica", in Merano
  - Engineer Company "Orobica", in Merano

==== Alpine Brigade "Tridentina" ====
- Alpine Brigade "Tridentina", in Brixen
  - Command and Signal Unit "Tridentina", in Brixen
  - Alpini Battalion "Bassano", in Innichen
  - Alpini Battalion "Trento", in Welsberg
  - Alpini Fortification Battalion "Val Brenta" (Reserve), in Innichen
    - 262nd Alpini Fortification Company "Val Cismon", in Innichen
  - Alpini Battalion "Bolzano" (Reserve), in Bruneck
  - Mountain Artillery Group "Asiago", in Toblach, (M56 105 mm pack howitzers)
  - Mountain Artillery Group "Vicenza", in Elvas, (M114 155 mm towed howitzers)
  - Logistic Battalion "Tridentina", in Vahrn
  - Anti-tank Company "Tridentina", in Bruneck
  - Engineer Company "Tridentina", in Brixen

==== Alpine Brigade "Cadore" ====
- Alpine Brigade "Cadore", in Belluno
  - Command and Signal Unit "Cadore", in Belluno
  - Alpini Battalion "Feltre", in Feltre
  - Alpini Battalion "Pieve di Cadore", in Tai di Cadore
  - Alpini Battalion "Belluno" (Recruits Training), in Belluno
  - Mountain Artillery Group "Lanzo", in Belluno, (M56 105 mm pack howitzers)
  - Mountain Artillery Group "Agordo", in Bassano del Grappa, (M114 155 mm towed howitzers)
  - Logistic Battalion "Cadore", in Belluno
  - Anti-tank Company "Cadore", in Belluno
  - Engineer Company "Cadore", in Belluno

==== Alpine Brigade "Julia" ====
- Alpine Brigade "Julia", in Udine
  - Command and Signal Unit "Julia", in Udine
  - Alpini Battalion "Cividale", in Chiusaforte
  - Alpini Battalion "Gemona", in Tarvisio
  - Alpini Battalion "L'Aquila", in L'Aquila
  - Alpini Battalion "Tolmezzo", in Paluzza
  - Alpini Fortification Battalion "Val Tagliamento", in Tolmezzo
  - Alpini Battalion "Vicenza" (Recruits Training), in Codroipo
  - Mountain Artillery Group "Belluno", in Pontebba, (M56 105 mm pack howitzers, disbanded on 31 October 1989)
  - Mountain Artillery Group "Udine", in Tolmezzo, (M56 105 mm pack howitzers)
  - Mountain Artillery Group "Conegliano", in Udine, (M114 155 mm towed howitzers)
  - 15th Mountain Artillery Battery, in L'Aquila (M56 105 mm pack howitzers)
  - Logistic Battalion "Julia", in Vacile di Spilimbergo
  - Anti-tank Company "Julia", in Cavazzo Carnico
  - Engineer Company "Julia", in Gemona

=== 5th Army Corps ===
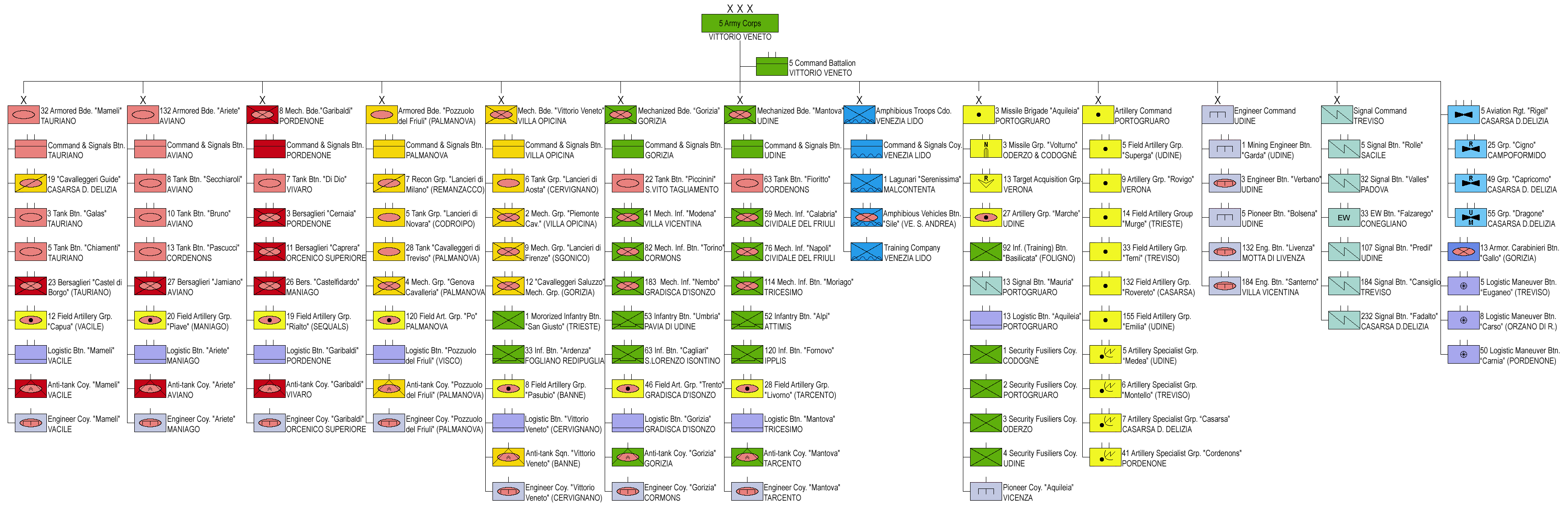
Structure of the 5th Army Corps in 1989 (click image to enlarge)

- 5th Army Corps, in Vittorio Veneto:
  - 5th Army Corps Command Unit, in Vittorio Veneto
  - Artillery Command, in Portogruaro
    - 5th Heavy Field Artillery Group "Superga", in Udine, (FH70 155 mm towed howitzers)
    - 9th Heavy Artillery Group "Rovigo", in Verona, (M115 203 mm towed howitzers)
    - 14th Field Artillery Group "Murge", in Trieste, (M114 155 mm towed howitzers)
    - 33rd Heavy Field Artillery Group "Terni", in Treviso, (FH70 155 mm towed howitzers)
    - 132nd Heavy Field Artillery Group "Rovereto", in Casarsa della Delizia, (FH70 155 mm towed howitzers)
    - 155th Heavy Field Artillery Group "Emilia", in Udine, (FH70 155 mm towed howitzers)
    - 5th Artillery Specialists Group "Medea", in Udine
    - 6th Artillery Specialists Group "Montello", in Treviso
    - 7th Artillery Specialists Group "Casarsa" (Reserve), in Casarsa della Delizia
    - 41st Artillery Specialists Group "Cordenons", in Pordenone
    - 12th Light Anti-aircraft Artillery Group "Nibbio" (Reserve), in Udine
    - 13th Light Anti-aircraft Artillery Group "Condor" (Reserve), in Treviso
    - 14th Light Anti-aircraft Artillery Group "Astore" (Reserve), in Casarsa della Delizia
  - Engineer Command, in Udine
    - 1st Mining Engineer Battalion "Garda", in Udine
    - 3rd Sappers Battalion "Verbano", in Udine
    - 5th Engineer Battalion "Bolsena", in Udine
    - 132nd Engineer Battalion "Livenza", in Motta di Livenza
    - 184th Engineer Battalion "Santerno", in Villa Vicentina
  - Signal Command, in Treviso
    - 5th Signal Battalion "Rolle", in Sacile
    - 33rd Electronic Warfare Battalion "Falzarego", in Conegliano
    - 107th Signal Battalion "Predil", in Udine
    - 184th Signal Battalion "Cansiglio", in Treviso
    - 232nd Signal Battalion "Fadalto", in Casarsa della Delizia
  - 5th Army Aviation Regiment "Rigel", in Casarsa della Delizia
    - 25th Army Aviation Squadrons Group "Cigno", in Campoformido
      - 425th Recon Helicopters Squadron (AB-206), in Vittorio Veneto
      - 481st Recon Helicopters Squadron (AB-206)
      - 482nd Recon Helicopters Squadron (AB-206)
    - 49th Reconnaissance Helicopters Squadrons Group "Capricorno", in Casarsa della Delizia
      - 491st Recon Helicopters Squadron (AB-206)
    - 55th Multirole Helicopters Squadrons Group "Dragone", in Casarsa della Delizia
      - 551st Multirole Helicopter Squadron (AB-205)
      - 552nd Multirole Helicopter Squadron (AB-205)
      - 553rd Multirole Helicopter Squadron (AB-205)
  - 13th Armored Carabinieri Battalion "M.O. Gallo", in Gorizia, (one Leopard 1A2 tank company, two VCC-2 mech infantry companies and one VCC-2/120mm heavy mortars company)
  - 5th Maneuver Logistic Battalion "Euganeo", in Treviso
  - 8th Maneuver Logistic Battalion "Carso", in Orzano di Remanzacco
  - 50th Maneuver Logistic Battalion "Carnia", in Pordenone

==== Armored Brigade "Mameli" ====
- 32nd Armored Brigade "Mameli", in Tauriano
  - Command and Signal Unit "Mameli", in Tauriano
  - 19th Reconnaissance Squadrons Group "Cavalleggeri Guide", in Casarsa della Delizia (two Leopard 1A2 tank companies and one VCC-2 mech infantry company)
  - 3rd Tank Battalion "M.O. Galas", in Tauriano, (M60A1 main battle tanks)
  - 5th Tank Battalion "M.O. Chiamenti", in Tauriano, (M60A1 main battle tanks)
  - 23rd Bersaglieri Battalion "Castel di Borgo", in Tauriano, (VCC-1 armored personnel carriers)
  - 12th Self-propelled Field Artillery Group "Capua", in Vacile, (M109 155 mm self-propelled howitzers)
  - Logistic Battalion "Mameli", in Vacile
  - Anti-tank Company "Mameli", in Vacile
  - Engineer Company "Mameli", in Vacile

==== Armored Brigade "Ariete" ====
- 132nd Armored Brigade "Ariete", in Pordenone
  - Command and Signal Unit "Ariete", in Pordenone
  - 8th Tank Battalion "M.O. Secchiaroli", in Aviano, (M60A1 main battle tanks)
  - 10th Tank Battalion "M.O. Bruno", in Aviano, (M60A1 main battle tanks)
  - 13th Tank Battalion "M.O. Pascucci", in Cordenons, (Leopard 1A2 main battle tanks) (Reserve status from December 1989, reassigned to Mechanized Brigade "Mantova")
  - 27th Bersaglieri Battalion "Jamiano", in Aviano, (VCC-1 armored personnel carriers)
  - 20th Self-propelled Field Artillery Group "Piave", in Maniago, (M109 155 mm self-propelled howitzers)
  - Logistic Battalion "Ariete", in Maniago
  - Anti-tank Company "Ariete", in Aviano
  - Engineer Company "Ariete", in Maniago

==== Armored Brigade "Pozzuolo del Friuli" ====
- Armored Brigade "Pozzuolo del Friuli", in Palmanova
  - Command and Signal Unit "Pozzuolo del Friuli", in Palmanova
  - 4th Mechanized Squadrons Group "Genova Cavalleria", in Palmanova, (VCC-2 armored personnel carriers)
  - 5th Tank Squadrons Group "Lancieri di Novara", in Codroipo, (Leopard 1A2 main battle tanks)
  - 28th Tank Squadrons Group "Cavalleggeri di Treviso", in Palmanova, (Leopard 1A2 main battle tanks)
  - 120th Self-propelled Field Artillery Group "Po", in Palmanova, (M109 155 mm self-propelled howitzers)
  - Logistic Battalion "Pozzuolo del Friuli", in Visco
  - Anti-tank Squadron "Pozzuolo del Friuli", in Palmanova
  - Engineer Company "Pozzuolo del Friuli", in Palmanova

==== Mechanized Brigade "Garibaldi" ====
- 8th Mechanized Brigade "Garibaldi", in Pordenone
  - Command and Signal Unit "Garibaldi", in Pordenone
  - 7th Tank Battalion "M.O. Di Dio", in Vivaro, (M60A1 main battle tanks)
  - 3rd Bersaglieri Battalion "Cernaia", in Pordenone, (VCC-1 armored personnel carriers)
  - 11th Bersaglieri Battalion "Caprera", in Orcenico Superiore, (VCC-1 armored personnel carriers)
  - 26th Bersaglieri Battalion "Castelfidardo", in Maniago, (VCC-1 armored personnel carriers)
  - 120th Infantry Fortification Battalion "Fornovo", in Ipplis di Premariacco
  - 19th Self-propelled Field Artillery Group "Rialto", in Sequals, (M109 155 mm self-propelled howitzers)
  - Logistic Battalion "Garibaldi", in Pordenone
  - Anti-tank Company "Garibaldi", in Vivaro
  - Engineer Company "Garibaldi", in Orcenico Superiore

==== Mechanized Brigade "Vittorio Veneto" ====
- Mechanized Brigade "Vittorio Veneto", in Villa Opicina
  - Command and Signal Unit "Vittorio Veneto", in Villa Opicina
  - 1st Motorized Infantry Battalion "San Giusto", in Trieste
  - 2nd Mechanized Squadrons Group "Piemonte Cavalleria", in Villa Opicina, (VCC-2 armored personnel carriers)
  - 6th Tank Squadrons Group "Lancieri di Aosta", in Cervignano del Friuli, (Leopard 1A2 main battle tanks)
  - 9th Tank Squadrons Group "Lancieri di Firenze", in Sgonico, (Leopard 1A2 main battle tanks)
  - 12th Mechanized Squadrons Group "Cavalleggeri di Saluzzo", in Gorizia, (VCC-2 armored personnel carriers)
  - 33rd Infantry Fortification Battalion "Ardenza", in Fogliano Redipuglia
  - 8th Self-propelled Field Artillery Group "Pasubio", in Banne, (M109 155 mm self-propelled howitzers)
  - Logistic Battalion "Vittorio Veneto", in Cervignano del Friuli
  - Anti-tank Squadron "Vittorio Veneto", in Banne
  - Engineer Company "Vittorio Veneto", in Cervignano del Friuli

==== Mechanized Brigade "Gorizia" ====
- Mechanized Brigade "Gorizia", in Gorizia
  - Command and Signal Unit "Gorizia", in Gorizia
  - 22nd Tank Battalion "M.O. Piccinini", in San Vito al Tagliamento, (Leopard 1A2 main battle tanks)
  - 41st Mechanized Infantry Battalion "Modena", in Villa Vicentina, (VCC-2 armored personnel carriers)
  - 53rd Infantry Fortification Battalion "Umbria", in Pavia di Udine
  - 63rd Infantry Fortification Battalion "Cagliari", in San Lorenzo Isontino
  - 82nd Mechanized Infantry Battalion "Torino", in Cormons, (VCC-2 armored personnel carriers)
  - 183rd Mechanized Infantry Battalion "Nembo", in Gradisca d'Isonzo, (VCC-2 armored personnel carriers)
  - 46th Self-propelled Field Artillery Group "Trento", in Gradisca d'Isonzo, (M109 155 mm self-propelled howitzers)
  - Logistic Battalion "Gorizia", in Gradisca d'Isonzo
  - Anti-tank Company "Gorizia", in Gorizia
  - Engineer Company "Gorizia", in Cormons

==== Mechanized Brigade "Mantova" ====
- Mechanized Brigade "Mantova", in Udine
  - Command and Signal Unit at Mantua, in Udine
  - 63rd Tank Battalion "M.O. Fioritto", in Cordenons, (Leopard 1A2 main battle tanks)
  - 7th Reconnaissance Squadrons Group "Lancieri di Milano", in Orzano di Remanzacco (two Leopard 1A2 tank companies and one VCC-2 mech infantry company, disbanded December 1989)
  - 52nd Infantry Fortification Battalion "Alpi", in Attimis
  - 59th Mechanized Infantry Battalion "Calabria", in Cividale del Friuli, (VCC-2 armored personnel carriers)
  - 76th Mechanized Infantry Battalion "Napoli", in Cividale del Friuli, (VCC-2 armored personnel carriers)
  - 114th Mechanized Infantry Battalion "Moriago", in Tricesimo, (VCC-2 armored personnel carriers)
  - 28th Self-propelled Field Artillery Group "Livorno", in Tarcento, (M109 155 mm self-propelled howitzers)
  - Logistic Battalion "Mantova", in Tricesimo
  - Anti-tank Company "Mantova", in Tarcento
  - Engineer Company "Mantova", in Tarcento

==== Amphibious Troops Command ====
- Amphibious Troops Command (Lagunari) in Venice-Lido
  - Command and Signal Unit, in Venice-Lido
  - 1st Lagunari Battalion "Serenissima", in Malcontenta, (VCC-2 armored personnel carriers)
  - Amphibious Battalion "Sile", in San Andrea, (LVTP-7 tracked amphibious personnel carriers)
  - Recruits Training Company, in Venice-Lido

==== 3rd Missile Brigade "Aquileia" ====
- 3rd Missile Brigade "Aquileia", in Portogruaro
  - 3rd Missile Artillery Group "Volturno" in Oderzo (HQ and 1st Battery) and Codogné (2nd and 3rd Battery) (MGM-52 Lance tactical ballistic missiles)
  - 27th Heavy Self-propelled Artillery Group "Marche", in Udine, (M110 203 mm self-propelled howitzers)
  - 13th Target Acquisition Group "Aquileia", in Verona
  - 13th Signal Battalion "Mauria", in Portogruaro
  - 13th Logistic Battalion "Aquileia", in Portogruaro
  - 92nd Infantry Battalion "Basilicata" (Recruits Training), in Foligno
  - 1st Security Fusiliers Company, Codogné
  - 2nd Security Fusiliers Company, Portogruaro
  - 3rd Security Fusiliers Company, Oderzo
  - 4th Security Fusiliers Company, Udine
  - Engineer Company "Aquileia", in Portogruaro

=== Northwestern Military Region ===
- Northwestern Military Region (R.M.N.O.), in Turin, responsible for the regions of Piedmont, Aosta, Liguria and Lombardy
  - R.M.N.O. Command Unit, in Turin
  - 4th Infantry Battalion "Guastalla" (Recruits Training), in Asti
  - 11th Infantry Battalion "Casale" (Recruits Training), in Casale Monferrato
  - 14th Bersaglieri Battalion "Sernaglia" (Recruits Training), in Albenga
  - 16th Infantry Battalion "Savona" (Recruits Training), in Savona
  - 23rd Infantry Battalion "Como" (Recruits Training), in Como
  - 26th Infantry Battalion "Bergamo" (Recruits Training), in Diano Castello
  - 72nd Infantry Battalion "Puglie" (Recruits Training), in Albenga
  - 41st Signal Battalion "Frejus", in Turin
  - 1st Transport Battalion "Monviso", in Turin
  - 1st Supply Unit, in Alessandria
  - 1st Provisions Supply Company, in Turin
  - 1st Medical Company, in Milan
  - Main Military Hospital, in Milan
  - Military Hospital Type A, in Turin
  - Military Hospital Type B, in Genoa
  - Military Hospital Type B, in Brescia
- Alpine Military School, in Aosta
  - Command Company, in Aosta
  - Alpini Battalion "Aosta", in Aosta (from 9 November 1989 "Tactical and Logistic Support Battalion "Aosta")
  - Training Battalion, in Aosta
  - Logistic Company, in Aosta
- Motorized Brigade "Piemonte" (Wartime mobilization)
  - Command and Signal Unit (to be formed by elements of the Northwest Military Command and the Alpine Military School)
  - 117th Motorized Infantry Battalion (from the "Mondovì" Alpini Recruits Training Battalion)
  - 217th Motorized Infantry Battalion (from the 4th Infantry Recruits Training Battalion "Guastalla")
  - 317th Motorized Infantry Battalion (from the "Aosta" Alpini Battalion)
  - 117th Field Artillery Group (M114 155mm towed howitzers, from 3rd Corps elements)
  - Logistic Battalion "Piemonte" (from 3rd Corps)
  - Engineer Company "Piemonte" (from the 131st Combat Engineers Battalion "Ticino")

=== Northeastern Military Region ===
- Northeastern Military Region (R.M.N.E.), in Padua, responsible for the regions Veneto, Friuli-Venezia Giulia and Trentino-Alto Adige/Südtirol
  - R.M.N.E. Command Unit, in Padua
  - 7th Infantry Battalion "Cuneo" (Recruits Training), in Udine
  - 32nd Signal Battalion "Valles", in Padua
  - 42nd Signal Battalion "Pordoi", in Padua
  - 23rd Signal Company, in Castelnuovo del Garda providing communication services at the secret West Star bunker complex, which in case of war would have housed NATO's COMLANDSOUTH (Command Allied Land Forces Southern Europe) and COMFIVEATAF (Command 5th Allied Tactical Air Force)
  - 14th Transport Battalion "Flavia", in Montorio Veronese

=== Tuscan-Emilian Military Region ===
- Tuscan-Emilian Military Region (R.M.T.E.), in Florence, responsible for the regions Tuscany and Emilia-Romagna
  - R.M.T.E. Command Unit, in Florence
  - 2nd Pontieri Engineer Regiment, in Piacenza
    - 1st Battalion, in Legnago
    - 2nd Battalion (Reserve), in Piacenza
    - 3rd Battalion, in Piacenza
  - Ferrovieri Engineer Regiment, in Castel Maggiore
    - 1st Disassemblable Metal Bridges Battalion, in Castel Maggiore
    - 2nd Operations Battalion, in Turin
  - 3rd Heavy Field Artillery Group (Reserve), in Modena (M114 155 mm towed howitzers)
  - 8th Heavy Field Artillery Group "Marmore", in Modena, (M114 155 mm towed howitzers)
  - 43rd Signal Battalion "Abetone", in Florence
  - 7th Transport Battalion "Monte Amiata", in Florence
  - 27th Army Aviation Squadrons Group "Mercurio", at Florence-Peretola Air Base
    - 271st Light Airplanes Squadron (SM-1019)
    - 427th Recon Helicopters Squadron (AB-206)

==== Paratroopers Brigade "Folgore" ====
- Paratroopers Brigade "Folgore", in Livorno
  - Command and Signal Unit "Folgore", in Livorno
  - 1st Carabinieri Paratroopers Battalion "Tuscania", in Livorno
  - 2nd Paratroopers Battalion "Tarquinia", in Livorno
  - 5th Paratroopers Battalion "El Alamein", in Siena
  - 9th Paratroopers Assault Battalion "Col Moschin", in Livorno
  - 185th Paratroopers Field Artillery Group "Viterbo", in Livorno, (M56 105 mm pack howitzers)
  - Military Parachutist School, in Pisa
    - 3rd Paratroopers Battalion "Poggio Rusco" (Recruits Training), in Pisa
  - Paratroopers Logistic Battalion "Folgore", in Pisa
  - 26th Army Aviation Squadrons Group "Giove", at Pisa-San Giusto Air Base
    - 426th Multirole Helicopter Squadron (AB-205)
    - 526th Recon Helicopters Squadron (AB-206)
  - Paratroopers Engineer Company "Folgore", in Lucca

==== Motorized Brigade "Friuli" ====
- Motorized Brigade "Friuli", in Florence
  - Command and Signal Unit "Friuli", in Florence
  - 19th Armored Battalion "M.O. Tumiati", in Florence (two Leopard 1A2 tank companies and one VCC-2 mech infantry company)
  - 35th Motorized Infantry Battalion "Pistoia" (Reserve), in Pistoia
  - 78th Motorized Infantry Battalion "Lupi di Toscana", in Scandicci
  - 87th Motorized Infantry Battalion "Senio", in Pistoia
  - 225th Infantry Battalion "Arezzo" (Recruits Training), in Arezzo
  - 35th Field Artillery Group "Riolo", in Pistoia, (two batteries with M114 155 mm towed howitzers, one battery with M56 105 mm pack howitzers and one battery with Stinger AA Missiles)
  - Logistic Battalion "Friuli", in Coverciano
  - Anti-tank Company "Friuli", in Scandicci
  - Engineer Company "Friuli", in Florence

=== Central Military Region ===
- Central Military Region (R.M.C.), in Rome, responsible for the regions Lazio, Molise, Marche, Abruzzo and Umbria
  - R.M.C. Command Unit, in Rome
  - Cavalry and Infantry School, in Cesano
    - 77th Mechanized Battalion "M.O. Mattei" (Recruits Training), in Cesano (became Tactical and Logistic Support Battalion "M.O.Mattei" on 25 July 1989)
  - Artillery School, in Bracciano
    - 1st Artillery Group "Cacciatori delle Alpi", in Bracciano
      - 1st battery with M114 155mm towed howitzers
      - 2nd battery with FH-70 155mm towed howitzers
      - 3rd battery with M109 self-propelled howitzers
      - 4th battery with SP-70 self-propelled howitzers and MLRS (disbanded during 1989)
  - Engineer School, in Rome
    - 4th Engineer Battalion "M.O. Montorsi" (Recruits Training), in Rome
  - 8th Mechanized Squadrons Group "Lancieri di Montebello", in Rome
  - 28th Infantry Battalion "Pavia" (Recruits Training), in Pesaro
  - 80th Infantry Battalion "Roma" (Recruits Training), in Cassino
  - 84th Infantry Battalion "Venezia" (Recruits Training), in Falconara Marittima
  - 123rd Infantry Battalion "Chieti" (Recruits Training), in Chieti
  - 6th Engineer Battalion "Trasimeno", in Rome
  - 44th Signal Battalion "Penne", in Rome
    - 26th Signal Company, in Rome
  - 8th Transport Battalion "Casilina", in Rome
  - 28th Army Aviation Squadrons Group "Tucano", at Roma-Urbe Air Base
    - 281st Light Airplanes Squadron (SM-1019)
    - 428th Recon Helicopters Squadron (AB-206)
  - Mechanized Brigade "Lazio" (Wartime mobilization)
    - Command and Signal Unit (to be formed by elements of the Central Military Command and the Infantry and Cavalry Military School)
    - 8th Mechanized Squadron Group "Lancieri di Montebello" (see above)
    - 77th Mechanized Infantry Battalion (see above)
    - 80th Motorized Infantry Battalion (from the 80th Infantry Training Battalion "Roma")
    - 1st Artillery Group "Cacciatori delle Alpi" (see above)
    - Logistic Battalion "Lazio" (from the Transports and Materials School)
    - Engineer Company "Lazio" (from the Engineers School)

==== Mechanized Brigade "Granatieri di Sardegna" ====
- Mechanized Brigade "Granatieri di Sardegna", in Rome
  - Command and Signal Unit "Granatieri di Sardegna", in Rome
  - 6th Tank Battalion "M.O. Scapuzzi", in Civitavecchia, (Leopard 1A2 main battle tanks)
  - 1st Bersaglieri Battalion "La Marmora", in Civitavecchia, (VCC-2 armored personnel carriers)
  - 1st Mechanized Granatieri Battalion "Assietta", in Rome, (VCC-1 armored personnel carriers)
  - 2nd Mechanized Granatieri Battalion "Cengio", in Rome, (VCC-1 armored personnel carriers)
  - 3rd Granatieri Battalion "Guardie" (Recruits Training), in Orvieto
  - 13th Field Artillery Group "Magliana", in Civitavecchia, (M114 155 mm towed howitzers)
  - Logistic Battalion "Granatieri di Sardegna", in Civitavecchia
  - Anti-tank Company "Granatieri di Sardegna", in Civitavecchia
  - Engineer Company "Granatieri di Sardegna", in Civitavecchia

==== Motorized Brigade "Acqui" ====
- Motorized Brigade "Acqui", in L'Aquila
  - Command and Signal Unit "Acqui", in L'Aquila
  - 9th Armored Battalion "M.O. Butera", in L'Aquila, (two Leopard 1A2 tanks companies and one M113 mech infantry company)
  - 17th Infantry Battalion "San Martino" (Recruits Training), in Sulmona
  - 57th Motorized Infantry Battalion "Abruzzi", in Sora
  - 70th Motorized Infantry Battalion "Ancona" (Reserve), in Sulmona
  - 130th Motorized Infantry Battalion "Perugia", in Spoleto
  - 48th Field Artillery Group "Taro", in L'Aquila, (M114 155 mm towed howitzers)
  - Logistic Battalion "Acqui", in L'Aquila
  - Anti-tank Company "Acqui", in L'Aquila
  - Engineer Company "Acqui", in L'Aquila

=== Southern Military Region ===
- Southern Military Region (R.M.M.), in Naples, responsible for the regions of Apulia, Basilicata, Campania and Calabria
  - R.M.M. Command Unit, in Naples
  - Armored Troops School, in Lecce
    - Command Unit, in Lecce
    - 21st Tank Battalion "M.O. Scognamiglio" (Recruits Training) (Reserve), in Lecce
    - 31st Tank Battalion "M.O. Andreani" (Recruits Training), in Lecce
    - Logistic Unit, in Lecce
  - 47th Infantry Battalion "Salento" (Recruits Training), in Barletta
  - 48th Infantry Battalion "Ferrara" (Recruits Training), in Bari
  - 89th Infantry Battalion "Salerno" (Recruits Training), in Salerno
  - 91st Infantry Battalion "Lucania" (Recruits Training), in Potenza
  - 244th Infantry Battalion "Cosenza" (Recruits Training), in Cosenza
  - 2nd Heavy Field Artillery Group "Potenza", in Barletta, (M114 155 mm towed howitzers)
  - 9th Heavy Field Artillery Group "Foggia", in Foggia, (M114 155 mm towed howitzers)
  - 47th Heavy Field Artillery Group "Gargano", in Bari, (M114 155 mm towed howitzers)
  - 10th Artillery Specialists Battery, in Foggia
  - 21st Engineer Battalion "Timavo", in Caserta
  - 45th Signal Battalion "Vulture", in Naples
  - 10th Transport Battalion "Appia", in Naples
  - Logistic Battalion "Persano", in Persano (activated 30 April 1989 to prepare for the arrival of the Bersaglieri Brigade "Garibaldi")
  - 20th Army Aviation Squadrons Group "Andromeda", at Salerno-Pontecagnano Air Base
    - 201st Light Airplanes Squadron (SM-1019)
    - 420th Recon Helicopters Squadron (AB-206)
    - 520th Multirole Helicopters Squadron (AB-212)
  - 10th Supply Unit, in Bari
  - 10th Provisions Supply Company, in Naples
  - 10th Medical Company, in Bari
  - Military Hospital Type A, in Bari
  - Military Hospital Type A, in Caserta
  - Military Hospital Type B, in Naples
  - Military Hospital Type B, in Catanzaro
  - Armored Brigade "Puglie" (Wartime mobilization)
    - Command and Signal Unit (to be formed by elements of the Southern Military Region Command and the Armored Troops School)
    - 21st Armored Battalion "M.O. Scognamiglio" (see above)
    - 31st Armored Battalion "M.O. Andreani"(see above)
    - Motorized Infantry Battalion (from Infantry Training Battalions)
    - Artillery Group (from Southern Military Region assets)
    - Logistic Battalion "Puglie" (from Southern Military Region and Armored Troops School)
    - Engineer Company "Puglie" (from Southern Military Region assets)

==== Mechanized Brigade "Pinerolo" ====
- Mechanized Brigade "Pinerolo", in Bari
  - Command and Signal Unit "Pinerolo", in Bari
  - 60th Tank Battalion "M.O. Locatelli", in Altamura, (Leopard 1A2 main battle tanks)
  - 9th Mechanized Infantry Battalion "Bari", in Trani, (VCC-1 armored personnel carriers)
  - 13th Mechanized Infantry Battalion "Valbella", in Avellino, (VCC-1 armored personnel carriers)
  - 67th Bersaglieri Battalion "Fagarè", in Persano, (VCC-1 armored personnel carriers)
  - 231st Infantry Battalion "Avellino" (Recruits Training), in Avellino
  - 11th Field Artillery Group "Teramo", in Persano, (M114 155 mm towed howitzers)
  - Logistic Battalion "Pinerolo", in Bari
  - Anti-tank Company "Pinerolo", in Bari
  - Engineer Company "Pinerolo", in Trani

=== Sicily Military Region ===
- Sicily Military Region (R.M.SI.), in Palermo (Sicily region)
  - R.M.SI. Command Unit, in Palermo
  - 60th Infantry Battalion "Col di Lana" (Recruits Training), in Trapani
  - 51st Engineer Battalion "Simeto", in Palermo (raised 1 October 1983)
  - 46th Signal Battalion "Mongibello", in Palermo
  - 11th Transport Battalion "Etnea", in Palermo
  - 30th Army Aviation Squadrons Group "Pegaso", at Catania-Fontanarossa Air Base
    - 301st Light Airplanes Squadron (SM.1019A planes)
    - 430th Reconnaissance Helicopters Squadron (AB 206 reconnaissance helicopters)
    - 530th Multirole Helicopters Squadron (AB 204B/205 multirole helicopters)
  - 11th Supply Unit, in Messina
  - 11th Medical Company, in Palermo
  - 11th Provisions Supply Company, in Palermo
  - 11th Army Repair Workshop, in Palermo
  - Type B Military Hospital, in Palermo
  - Type B Military Hospital, in Messina
  - Infantry Battalion "isole Minori", on Pantelleria island

==== Motorized Brigade "Aosta" ====
- Motorized Brigade "Aosta", in Messina
  - "Aosta" Command and Signal Battalion, in Messina
  - 5th Motorized Infantry Battalion "Col della Berretta", in Messina
  - 62nd Motorized Infantry Battalion "Sicilia", in Catania
  - 141st Motorized Infantry Battalion "Catanzaro", in Palermo
  - 62nd Armored Battalion "M.O. Jero", in Catania (two Leopard 1A2 tanks companies and one M113 mech infantry company)
  - 24th Field Artillery Group "Peloritani", in Messina, with M114 155 mm towed howitzers
  - Logistic Battalion "Aosta", in Messina
  - Anti-tank Company "Aosta", in Messina
  - Engineer Company "Aosta", in Syracuse

=== Sardinia Military Command ===
- Sardinia Military Command (CMS), in Cagliari, responsible for the island of Sardinia
  - CMS Command Unit, in Cagliari
  - 45th Infantry Battalion "Arborea" (Recruits Training), in Macomer
  - 21st Army Aviation Squadrons Group "Orsa Maggiore", at Cagliari-Elmas Air Base
    - 211th Light Airplanes Squadron (SM-1019)
    - 421st Recon Helicopters Squadron (AB-206)
    - 521st Multirole Helicopters Squadron (AB-205)
  - 47th Signal Battalion "Gennargentu", in Cagliari
  - 12th Mixed Transport Unit, in Cagliari
  - 12th Supply Unit, in Nuoro
  - 12th Medical Company, in Cagliari
  - 12th Provisions Supply Company, in Cagliari
  - Military Hospital Type B, in Cagliari

==== Motorized Brigade "Sassari" ====
- Motorized Brigade "Sassari", in Sassari
  - Command and Signal Unit "Sassari", in Sassari
  - 1st Armored Infantry (Training) Regiment, in Capo Teulada
    - 1st Armored Infantry Battalion
      - Command Company
      - 1st Tank Company, 16x Leopard 1A2 main battle tanks
      - 2nd Bersaglieri Company, 13x M113 armored personnel carriers
      - Reconnaissance Helicopter Squadron, 6x AB-47 helicopters
      - Self-propelled Artillery Battery, 6x M109 155 mm
    - 2nd Armored Infantry Battalion (Reserve)
    - Logistic Unit
  - 151st Motorized Infantry Battalion "Sette Comuni", in Cagliari
  - 152nd Motorized Infantry Battalion "Sassari", in Sassari
  - 170th Artillery Group (Reserve)

=== Anti-aircraft Artillery Command ===
- Anti-aircraft Artillery Command, in Padua
  - Command Unit, in Padua
  - 4th Anti-aircraft Missile Artillery Regiment, in Mantua
    - Command Battery, Mantua
    - 1st Anti-aircraft Missile Artillery Group, in Ravenna, (MIM-23 Hawk surface-to-air missiles)
    - 2nd Anti-aircraft Missile Artillery Group, in Mantua, (MIM-23 Hawk surface-to-air missiles)
    - 24th Signal Company, in Mantua
  - 5th Anti-aircraft Missile Artillery Regiment, in Mestre
    - Command Battery, Mestre
    - 1st Anti-aircraft Missile Artillery Group, in San Donà di Piave, (MIM-23 Hawk surface-to-air missiles)
    - 2nd Anti-aircraft Missile Artillery Group, in Rovigo, (MIM-23 Hawk surface-to-air missiles)
    - 25th Signal Company, in Mestre
  - 121st Light Anti-aircraft Artillery Regiment "Ravenna", in Bologna
    - 1st Light Anti-aircraft Artillery Group, in Bologna
    - 2nd Light Anti-aircraft Artillery Group, in Mestre
    - 3rd Light Anti-aircraft Artillery Group, in Rimini
    - 4th Light Anti-aircraft Artillery Group, in Ferrara
  - 17th Light Anti-aircraft Artillery Group "Sforzesca", at Villafranca Air Base
    - Command Battery, at Villafranca Air Base
    - 1st Light Anti-aircraft Artillery Battery, at Villafranca Air Base
    - 2nd Light Anti-aircraft Artillery Battery, at Ghedi Air Base
    - 3rd Light Anti-aircraft Artillery Battery, at Istrana Air Base
  - 21st Light Anti-aircraft Artillery Group "Sparviero" (Reserve), in Villafranca
  - 22nd Light Anti-aircraft Artillery Group "Alcione" (Reserve), in Bologna
  - 235th Infantry Battalion "Piceno" (Recruits Training), in Ascoli Piceno
  - Anti-aircraft Missiles Supply and Repairs Unit, in Montichiari
  - Anti-aircraft Artillery Materiel Supply and Repairs Unit, in Bologna

=== Units directly reporting to the Army General Staff ===
- Army General Staff, in Rome
  - 1st Army Aviation Regiment "Antares", in Viterbo
    - 11th Transport Helicopter Squadrons Group "Ercole", in Viterbo, (CH-47C Chinook heavy-lift helicopters)
      - 111st Medium Transport Helicopters Squadron
      - 112nd Medium Transport Helicopters Squadron
      - 120th Medium Transport Helicopters Squadron
    - 51st Multirole Helicopter Squadrons Group "Leone", in Viterbo, (AB-412 utility helicopters)
      - 511th Multirole Helicopters Squadron
      - 512th Multirole Helicopters Squadron
    - 39th Helicopter Squadrons Group "Drago", in Alghero-Fertilia, supporting the military intelligence agency SISMI
      - 399th Light Airplanes Squadron (SM-1019)
      - Multirole Helicopters Squadron (A109C)
    - ItalAir Squadron, in Naqoura (Lebanon, part of the UNIFIL mission, with AB-205)
  - 1st NBC Battalion "Etruria", in Rieti
  - 8th Signals Intelligence Battalion "Tonale", in Anzio
  - 9th Electronic Warfare Battalion "Rombo", in Anzio
  - 10th Signal Battalion "Lanciano", in Rome
  - 11th Signal Battalion "Leonessa", in Civitavecchia
  - 10th Maneuver Transport Group "Salaria", in Rome
  - 11th Maneuver Transport Group "Flaminia", in Rome
  - 1st Army Aviation Maintenance Battalion "Idra", in Bracciano
  - 2nd Army Aviation Maintenance Battalion "Orione", in Bologna
  - 3rd Army Aviation Maintenance Battalion "Aquila", in Orio al Serio
  - 4th Army Aviation Maintenance Battalion "Scorpione", in Viterbo

== See also ==
- Structure of the Italian Army for the current structure of the Italian Army.
