= Army Signal Command (Italy) =

Signal Command
- Comando Trasmissioni
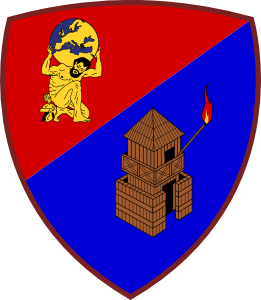
- Coat of arms of the Signal Command
- Active: 1 January 2017 - Present
- Country: Italy
- Branch: Italian Army
- Role: Signals
- Part of: Operational Land Forces Support Command
- Garrison/HQ: Caserma “Giuseppe Perotti”, Rome, Italy
- Patron: Archangel Gabriel
- Anniversaries: 20 June 1918
- Decorations: Army silver medal (1993)

Commanders
- Current commander: Gen. B. Stefano Francesconi

Insignia
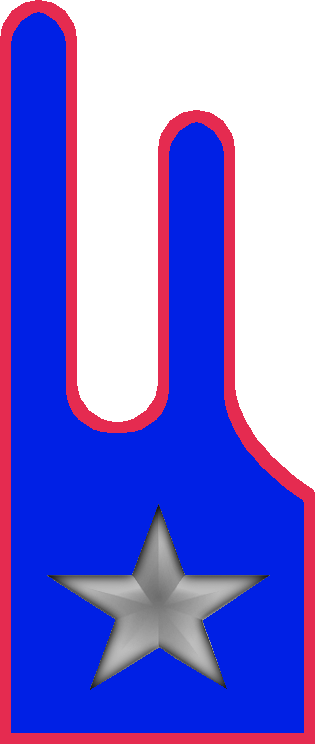
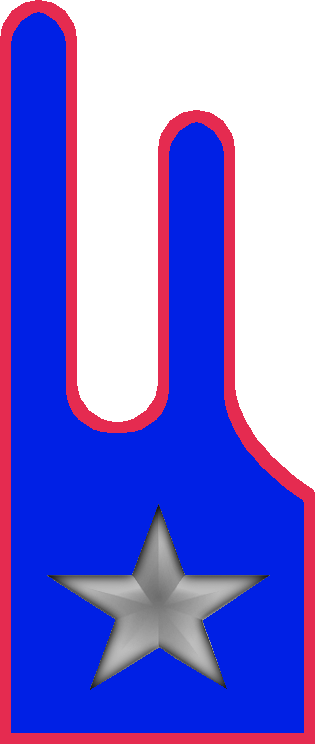
- Signal arm gorget patches

The Signal Command (Italian: Comando Trasmissioni) is a signals formation of the Italian Army. The Signal Command was established in Rome on 1 January 2017 following the disestablishment of the Army Information and Signals Command and of the Signals Brigade.

The Command is in charge of providing C4 support both at home and abroad.

== History ==
While coming from the history and traditions of the Arm of Signals of the Italian Army, the current Signal Command was established on 1 January 2017 following the reorganization of the C4 sector of the Italian Army.

The Army Information and Signals Command (Italian: Comando Trasmissioni e Informazioni dell’Esercito) was disestablished in 2016, and the Signals Brigade, based in Anzio, was reorganized and converted in an unified agency.

=== Commanders ===
The Army Signal Command has had two commanders as such:

- Gen. B. Luigi Carpineto (1 January 2017 - 11 July 2019);
- Gen. B. Stefano Francesconi (12 July 2019 - present).

== Mission ==
The Signal Command is responsible for the construction and management of the field C4 systems to support operations, is responsible for the operation and maintenance of the Italian Army C4 system, and its integration at joint level.

The Signal Command, through the School of Transmissions and Information Technology, functions as Training and ICT Certification Center, as head of the training function of the sector, is delegated, as a pole for information and communication of the Italian Army, to training of all Army personnel in this specific sector.

In operations or exercises, the Signal Command establishes a specialized Command/Staff employed by a superordinate command, framing its own units, or part of them, or other units in reinforcement. The Signal Command units are to be trained to intervene also in safeguarding the institutions, in carrying out tasks for public calamities and cases of necessity and urgency.

Finally, through the Army Signal Command Cybernetic Security Unit, the Signal Command plans, conducts and implements operations in the Army-related cybernetic domain in theater of operations and, if necessary, on national territory, ensuring their protection and resilience and contributing to the Army's overall Cyber Defense (CD) capacity.

== Organization ==
The Signal Command is part of the Operational Land Forces Support Command, based in Verona. The Commander of the Signal Command is a specialist adviser to the Commander of Support COMFOTER.

The Signal Command controls elements directly subordinated to the Commander, as well as seven Signal Regiments.

=== Elements directly subordinated to the commander ===
Directly subordinated to the commander are:

- Signal and IT School (Rome);
- 9th Cybernetic Security Unit "Rombo" (Rome)

=== Operational support regiments ===
Four operational support regiments are assigned to the Signal Command. These four regiments provide signals and communications during domestic and foreign operations:

- 2nd Alpine Signal Regiment (Alpini) (Bolzano):
  - Battalion "Gardena"
  - Battalion "Pordoi"
- 7th Signal Regiment (Sacile):
  - Battalion "Rolle"
  - Battalion "Predil"
- 11th Signal Regiment (Civitavecchia):
  - Battalion "Leonessa"
  - Battalion "Tonale"
- 232nd Signal Regiment (Avellino):
  - Battalion "Legnano"
  - Battalion "Fadalto"

=== National support regiments ===
Three national support regiments are assigned to the Signal Command. These three regiments operate and maintain the army's national signal and telecommunications networks.

- 3rd Signal Regiment (Rome):
  - Battalion "Lanciano" (Rome)
  - Battalion "Abetone" (Florence)
  - Battalion "Gennargentu" (Cagliari)
- 32nd Signal Regiment (Padua):
  - Battalion "Valles" (Padua)
  - Battalion "Frejus" (Turin)
- 46th Signal Regiment (Palermo):
  - Battalion "Mongibello" (Palermo)
  - Battalion "Vulture" (Nocera Inferiore)

== See also ==
- List of units of the Italian Army
- Structure of the Italian Army
- Military aid to the civil power
