= Tactical Intelligence Brigade (Italy) =

- Brigata Informazioni Tattiche
- Coat of Arms of the Tactical Intelligence Brigade
- Active: 1 June 2004 - present
- Country: Italy
- Branch: Italian Army
- Role: ISTAR & Electronic Warfare
- Size: Brigade
- Part of: COMFOTER SUPPORT
- Garrison/HQ: Anzio
- Decorations: 1x Bronze Medal of Army Valour

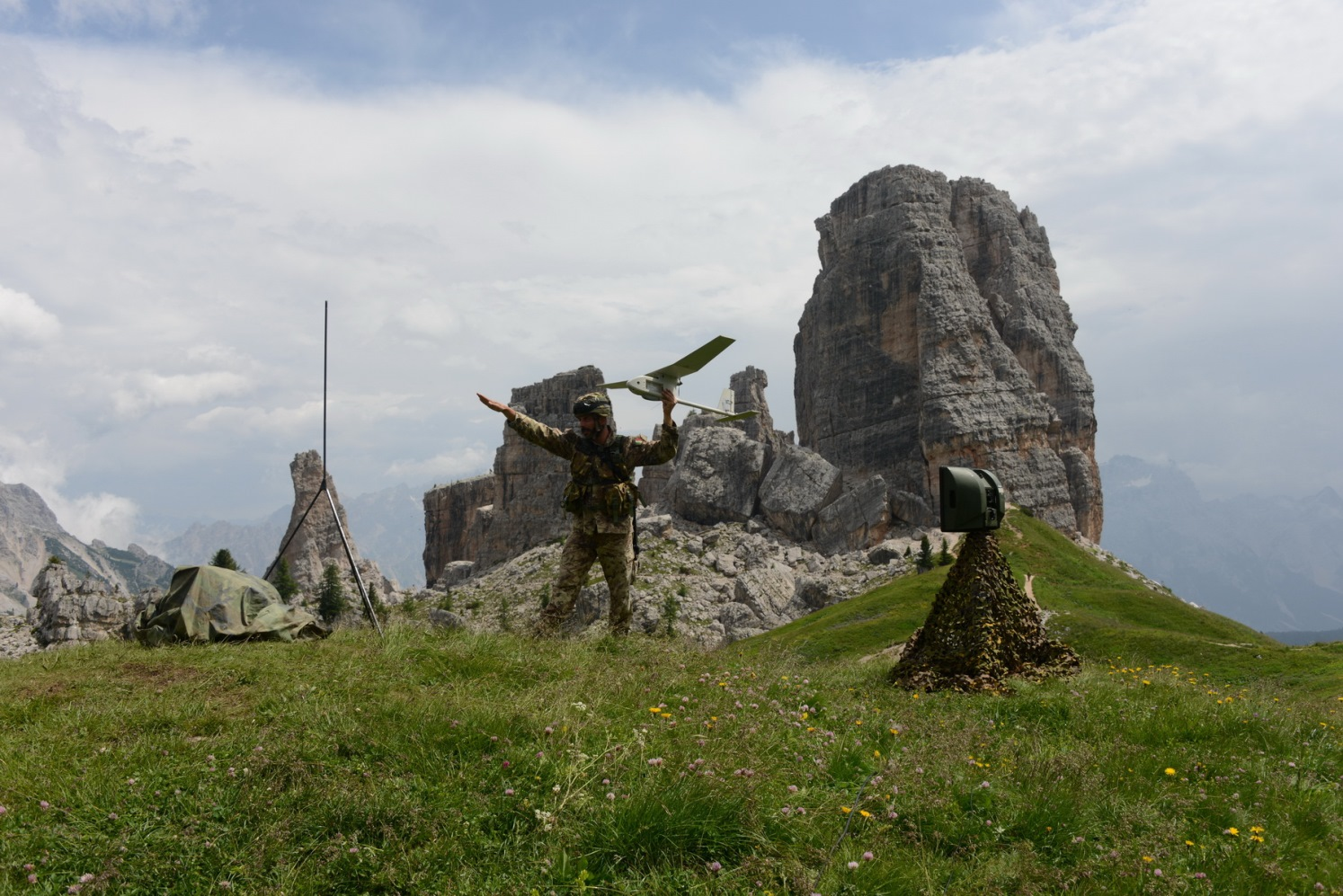
41st IMINT Regiment "Cordenons" operator launching a RQ-11B Raven in the Dolomites with a Squire radar in the background

The Tactical Intelligence Brigade (Italian: Brigata Informazioni Tattiche) is the Italian Army's Intelligence, surveillance, target acquisition, and reconnaissance (ISTAR) & Electronic Warfare (EW) unit. Founded 1 June 2004 as RISTA-EW Brigade the unit changed its name on 5 November 2018 to better reflect its mission: to collect military information on the tactical level, useful to the needs of the operational level.

== History ==
The brigade's origins lie with the Electronic Defense Center (Centro Difesa Elettronica - CDE) raised in 1963 in Anzio. Initially the center consisted of the IX Signal Battalion and XI Signal Battalion, to which a Signals Intelligence Unit was added in the 1960s. With the 1975 army reform the center's Signals Intelligence Unit became the 8th Signals Intelligence Battalion "Tonale" and IX Signal Battalion became the 9th Electronic Warfare Battalion "Rombo".

With the end of the Cold War the army reduced its forces in the Northeast of Italy and so on 1 January 1996 the center received the 33rd Electronic Warfare Battalion "Falzarego" in Treviso from the 5th Army Corps. On 20 January 1998 the center disbanded the 9th Electronic Warfare Battalion "Rombo", while the 33rd Electronic Warfare Battalion "Falzarego" was reorganized and elevated to 33rd Electronic Warfare Regiment on 28 October 2002.

On 19 May 1998 the center was reorganized and renamed RISTA-EW Grouping and the 8th Signals Intelligence Battalion "Tonale" was diasbanded. On 1 June 2004, the grouping was elevated to RISTA-EW Brigade, when the 41st IMINT Regiment "Cordenons" joined the grouping on that day. On 28 June 2005 the 13th Battalion "Aquileia" in Anzio was raised and joined the brigade as its Human Intelligence (HUMINT) unit. On 5 November 2018 the brigade was renamed Tactical Intelligence Brigade and on the same date the 13th Battalion "Aquileia" was reorganized and renamed 13th Regiment. In 2022 the brigade was augmented with the 28th Regiment "Pavia" and the Multinational CIMIC Group, which was renamed 7th CIMIC Regiment in 2024.

== Organization ==
As of 2026 the brigade is organized as follows:

- Tactical Intelligence Brigade, in Anzio (Lazio)
  - 7th CIMIC Regiment, in Motta di Livenza (Veneto), multi-national NATO Civil-military co-operation (CIMIC) unit with troops from Greece, Hungary, Italy, Portugal and Romania
  - 9th Cybernetic Security Regiment "Rombo", in Rome-Cecchignola (Lazio)
  - 13th HUMINT Regiment, in Anzio (Lazio), Human Intelligence (HUMINT) unit
  - 28th Regiment "Pavia", in Pesaro (Marche), Operational Communications unit
  - 33rd EW Regiment, in Treviso (Veneto), Electronic Warfare (EW) unit
  - 41st IMINT Regiment "Cordenons", in Sora (Lazio), Imagery intelligence (IMINT) unit
  - Tactical Intelligence Training Center, in Anzio

== Gorget patches ==
The personnel of the brigade's units wears the following gorget patches:

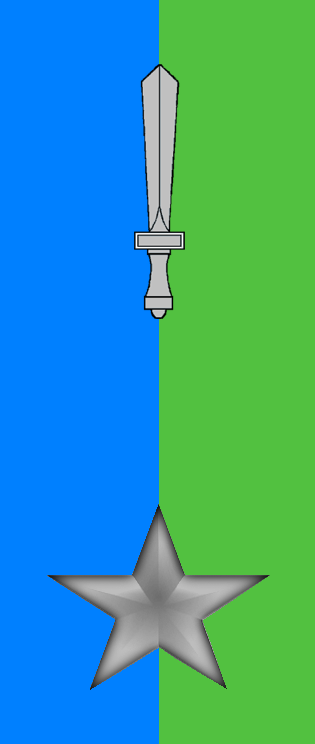
7th CIMIC Regiment

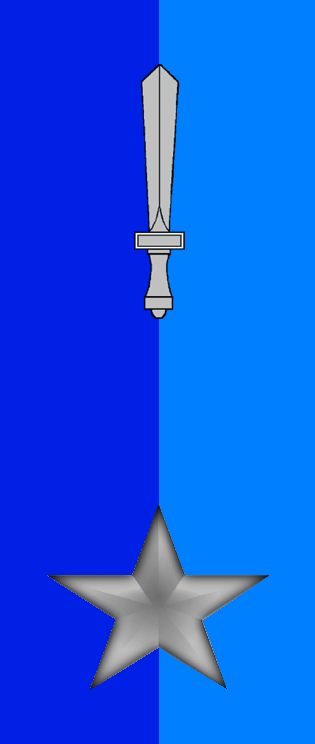
9th Cybernetic Security Regiment "Rombo"

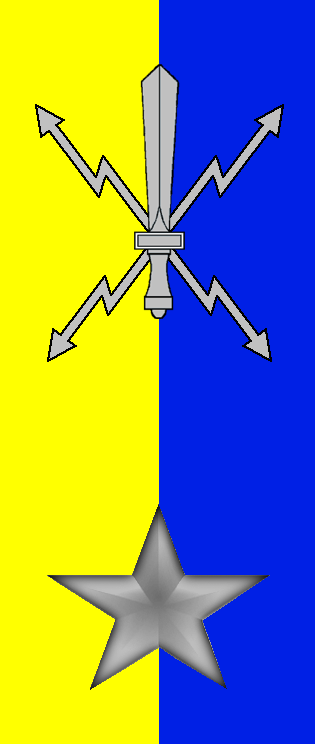
13th HUMINT Regiment

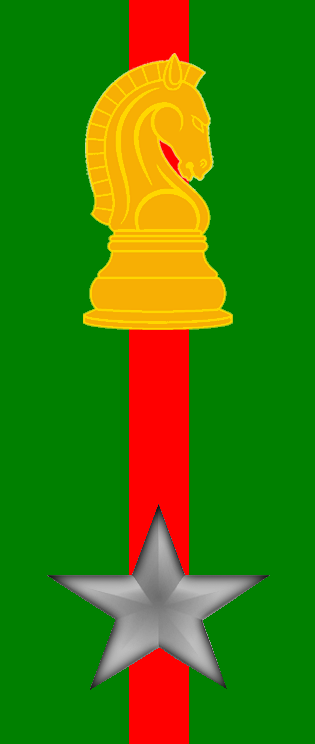
28th Regiment "Pavia"

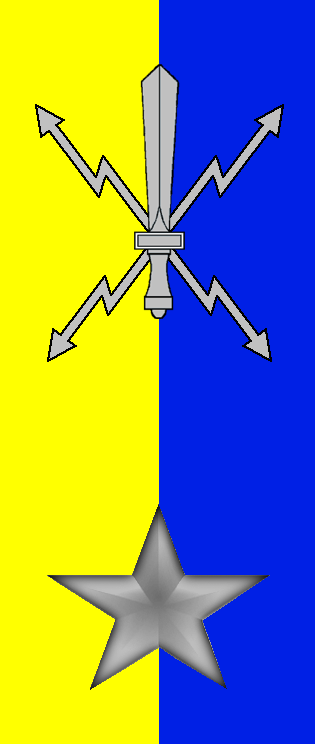
33rd EW Regiment

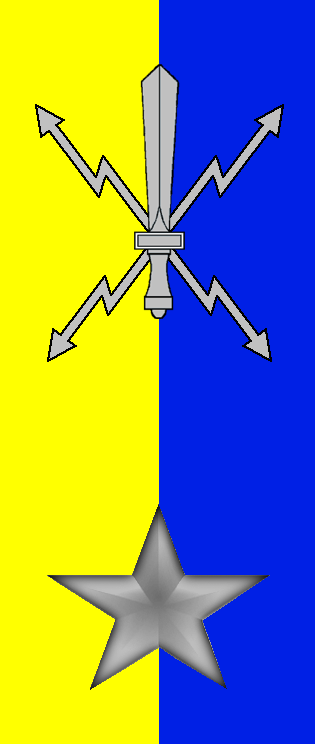
41st IMINT Regiment "Cordenons"
