= Combat Support Forces Command =

- Comando delle Forze di Supporto al Combattimento
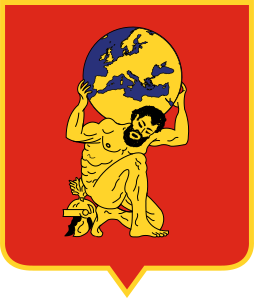
- Coat of arms of the Combat Support Forces Command
- Active: 1 October 2016 - present
- Country: Italy
- Branch: Italian Army
- Role: Combat support Combat service support
- Size: 16,000 troops ca.
- Part of: Operational Land Forces Command
- Garrison/HQ: Rome

Commanders
- Current commander: Gen. C.A.Giuseppenicola Tota
- Chief of Staff: Gen. B. Antonello Messenio Zanitti
- Notable commanders: Alberto Ficuciello

The Combat Support Forces Command (Italian: Comando delle Forze di Supporto al Combattimento, abbreviation: COMFORSUP COMBAT) is a higher command of the Italian Army tasked with providing support resources to the Operational Land Forces Command.

== History ==
The command as established on 1 October 2016 as Operational Land Forces Support Command by splitting of the Operational Land Forces Command in the Operational Land Forces Command - Army Operational Command (COMFOTER - COE) and in the Operational Land Forces Support Command itself.

The Operational Land Forces Support Command was established in accordance to the 2013 Revision Plan of the Ground Military Instrument of the Army Staff. The Revision Plan gave to COMFOTER SPT a chain of command independent from the Operational Forces Command, by upgrading the former Supports Command of the Land Operational Forces and placing the newly established COMFOTER SPT directly under the Chief of Staff of the Italian Army. On 1 October 2025, the command was renamed Combat Support Forces Command.

=== Commanders ===
In its various configurations, the Operational Land Forces Support Command has had a total of ten Commanders:

Commanders of the Operational Land Forces Command

- Ten. Gen. Alberto Ficuciello (2001 - 2003);
- Ten. Gen. Antonio Quintana (2003 - 2003);
- Gen. C.A. Cosimo D'Arrigo (2003 - 2005);
- Gen. C.A. Bruno Iob (2005 - 2008);
- Gen. C.A. Armando Novelli (2008 - 2010);
- Gen. C.A. Francesco Tarricone (2010 - 2012);
- Gen. C.A. Roberto Bernardini (2012 - 2014);
- Gen. C.A. Alberto Primicerj (2014 - 2016);
- Gen. C.A. Amedeo Sperotto (2016 - 2018);
- Gen. C.A. Giuseppenicola Tota (2018 - 2020);
- Gen. C.A. Massimo Scala (2020 - )

Commanders of the Operational Land Forces Support Command:

- Gen. C.A.Amedeo Sperotto (2016 - 2018);
- Gen. C.A.Giuseppenicola Tota (2018–2020).

== Mission ==
The Combat Support Forces Command is a management, coordination and control body of the tactical and logistic support Commands and Units of the Italian Army. The Command is also responsible for the preparation of these Units and Commands, subject to an operational use both nationally and internationally.

== Organization ==
The Combat Support Forces Command is subordinated to the Operational Land Forces Command and based in Rome. The Commander makes use of several subordinate bodies to direct the complex of activities entrusted and the subordinate units and commands:

- Commander area;
- Office of the Commanding General;
- Administration Office;
- Chief of Staff - Coordination Section of the General Staff;
- Planning, Programming and Budget Office;
- Legal affairs Office;
- Plans and Situation Office;
- Training Office;
- Security Office;
- Personnel Office;
- Logistic Office;
- General Affairs Office;
- Studies, Regulations and Lessons Learned Office;
- Command Unit.

The Command controls a total of approximately 16,000 troops.

=== Organization ===
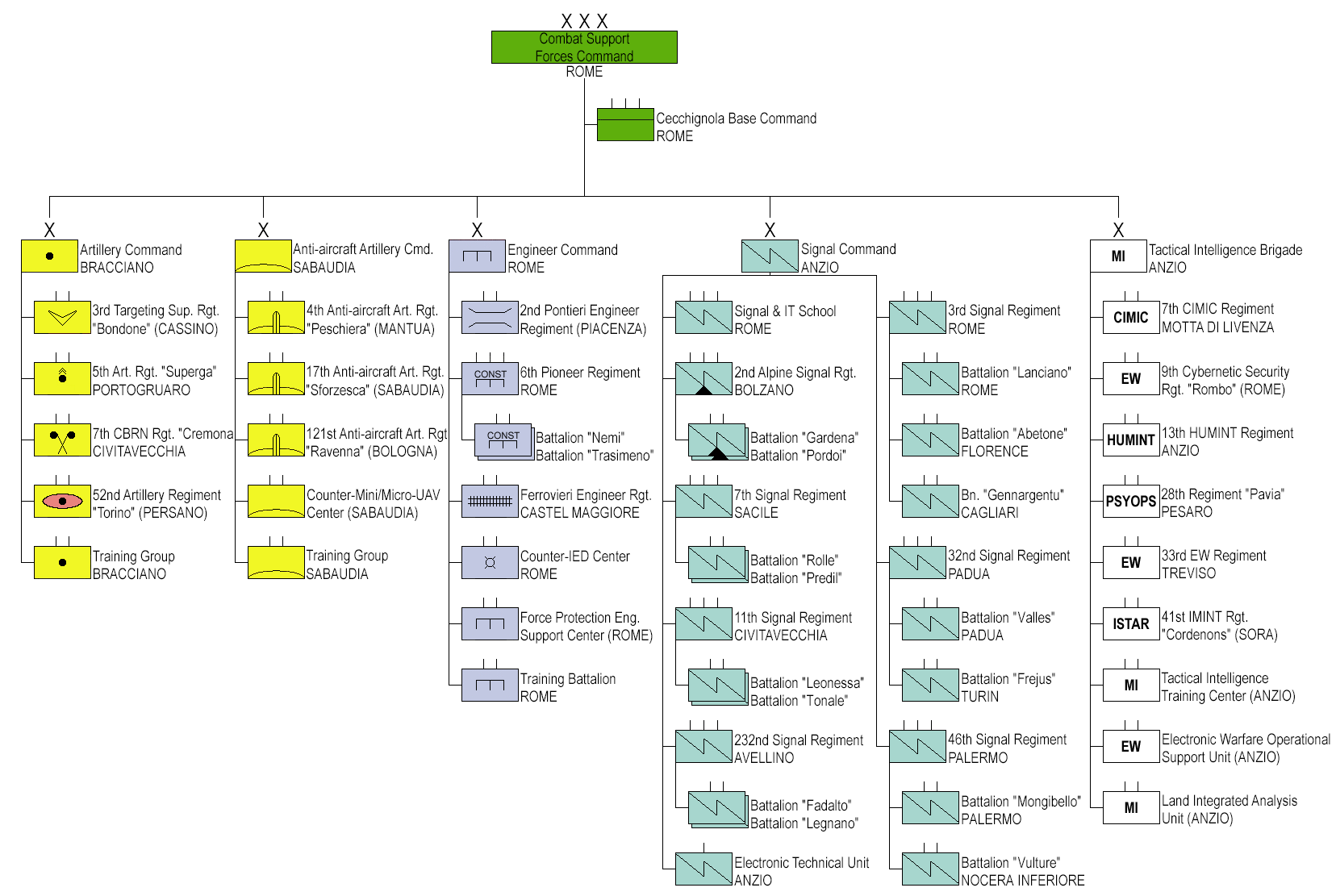
Combat Support Forces Command organization 2025 (click to enlarge)

As of 2025 the Combat Support Forces Command consists of the following five commands at brigade-level:

- Artillery Command (Bracciano)
- Anti-aircraft Artillery Command (Sabaudia)
- Engineer Command (Rome)
- Signal Command (Rome)
- Tactical Intelligence Brigade (Anzio)
- Cecchignola Base Command, in Rome-Cecchignola (Lazio)
  - Support Regiment "Cecchignola", in Rome-Cecchignola (Lazio) (supporting the commands, schools and units based at the Cecchignola military base)

== See also ==
- Structure of the Italian Army
- Military aid to the civil power
- Operational Land Forces Command
