= 33rd EW Regiment (Italy) =

Active Italian Army electronic warfare unit

- 33° Reggimento EW
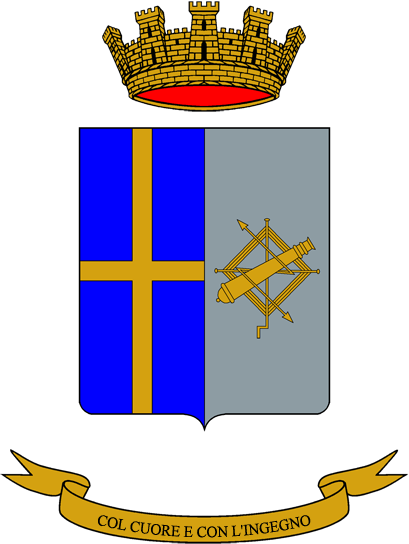
- Regimental coat of arms
- Active: 1 Nov. 1975 — today
- Country: Italy
- Branch: Italian Army
- Role: Electronic Warfare
- Part of: Tactical Intelligence Brigade
- Garrison/HQ: Treviso
- Motto: "Col cuore e con l'ingegno"
- Anniversaries: 20 June 1918 - Second Battle of the Piave River
- Decorations: 1× Gold Cross of Army Merit

Insignia
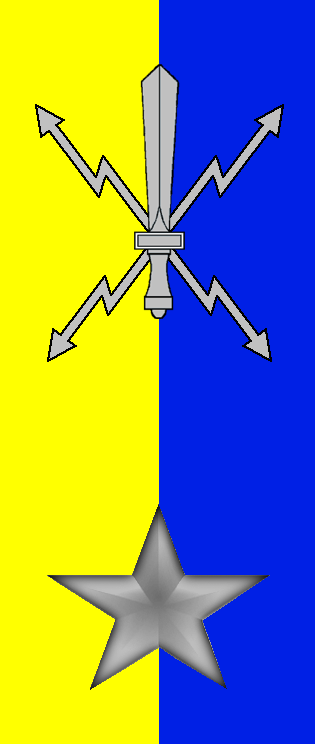
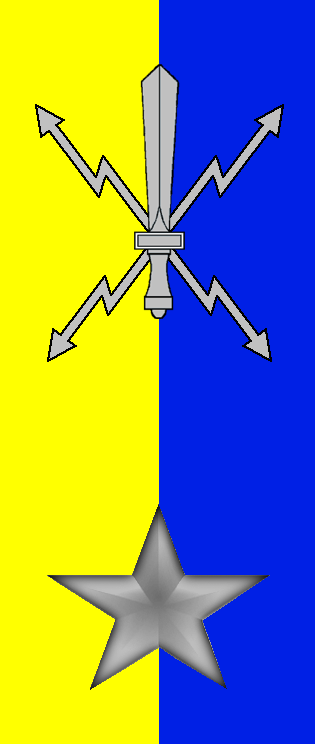
- Regimental gorget patches

The 33rd EW Regiment (Italian: 33° Reggimento EW) is an Electronic Warfare unit of the Italian Army based in Treviso. Originally a unit of the army's signal arm, the regiment is today a multi-arms unit assigned to the Tactical Intelligence Brigade, which combines elements of the artillery and signal arms. The unit was formed in 1975 as a battalion and tasked with tactical electronic warfare operations in northeastern Italy. The battalion was named for Falzarego Pass and assigned to the V Territorial Military Command. In 1979, the battalion was transferred to the 5th Army Corps. In 1998, the 8th Signals Intelligence Battalion "Tonale" and 9th Electronic Warfare Battalion "Rombo" were disbanded and part of the two battalions tasks and personnel were transferred to the 33rd Electronic Warfare Battalion "Falzarego". In 2002, the battalion lost its autonomy and entered the newly formed 33rd EW Regiment. The regiment's anniversary falls, as for all signal units, on 20 June 1918, the day the Austro-Hungarian Army began its retreat across the Piave river during the Second Battle of the Piave River.

== History ==
=== Cold War ===
On 15 April 1955, the Ministry of Defense-Army Special Signal Battalion formed the Special Signal I-RG Company in Rome, which was tasked with interception and radio direction finding (Italian: Intercettazione-RadioGoniometria). In 1958, the company formed a detachment in Arzene near the border with Yugoslavia. On 1 April 1959, the Signal School's XI Signal Battalion was disbanded and the battalion's personnel formed, together with the Special Signal I-RG Company, the IX Signal Battalion. In 1961, the detachment in Arzene was transferred from the IX Signal Battalion to the XXXII Army Signal Battalion in Padua. The same year the detachment moved from Arzene to Latisana.

On 1 September 1964, the detachment was expanded to Mixed Company. On 15 December 1969, the company moved from Latisana to Conegliano. On 31 December 1969, the XXXII Army Signal Battalion was split to form the next day two new battalions: the XXXI Army Signal Battalion (Operations) and the XXXII Army Signal Battalion (Mixed). The latter battalion included the Mixed Company, which on the same day was renamed Mixed Electronic Warfare Company.

On 31 August 1970, the Mixed Electronic Warfare Company left the XXXII Army Signal Battalion (Mixed). The next day, on 1 September 1970, the company became an autonomous unit and was assigned to the V Military Territorial Command. On 5 February 1975, the Mixed Electronic Warfare Company was renamed 2nd Mixed Company and the 1st ESM Company was formed. On the same day, both companies entered the newly formed XXXIII Electronic Warfare Battalion, which also included a command and a command and services platoon.

During the 1975 army reform the army disbanded the regimental level and newly independent battalions were granted for the first time their own flags. During the reform signal battalions were renamed for mountain passes. On 1 November 1975, the XXXIII Electronic Warfare Battalion was renamed 33rd Electronic Warfare Battalion "Falzarego". The battalion was named for the Falzarego Pass in the Dolomites, which was fiercely contested between the Royal Italian Army and the Austro-Hungarian Army during World War I. On 12 November 1976, the President of the Italian Republic Giovanni Leone granted with decree 846 the battalion a flag. The flag of the Falzarego arrived at the unit's base on 21 March 1976.

On 1 March 1979, the battalion was transferred from the V Territorial Military Command to the 5th Army Corps' Signal Command. On 29 June 1985, the battalion moved from Conegliano to Sacile and in 1991 the battalion moved from Sacile to Treviso. On 1 January 1996, the battalion was transferred from the 5th Army Corps to the Intelligence and Electronic Defense Command.

=== Recent times ===
On 1 January 1998, the army disbanded the 8th Signals Intelligence Battalion "Tonale" and 9th Electronic Warfare Battalion "Rombo" and their operational tasks and the associated personnel were transferred to the 33rd Electronic Warfare Battalion "Falzarego", while their strategic and intelligence-related tasks and the associated personnel were transferred to the Italian Armed Forces General Staff's Information and Security Department. On 1 June 1999, the Signal Speciality left the Italian Army's Engineer Arm and was elevated to Signal Arm.

On 28 October 2002, the 33rd Electronic Warfare Battalion "Falzarego" lost its autonomy and the next day entered the newly formed 33rd EW Regiment as Battalion "Falzarego". On the same day, the flag of the 33rd Electronic Warfare Battalion "Falzarego" was transferred from the battalion to the 32nd EW Regiment. On 1 September 2004, the regiment was assigned to the RISTA-EW Brigade, which, on 5 November 2018, was renamed Tactical Intelligence Brigade.

== Organization ==
As of 2024 the 33rd EW Regiment is organized as follows:

- 33rd EW Regiment, in Treviso
  - Command and Logistic Support Company
  - Battalion "Falzarego"
    - 1st EW Company
    - 2nd EW Company
    - 3rd EW Company
    - 4th EW Company

The Command and Logistic Support Company fields the following platoons: C3I Platoon, Transport and Materiel Platoon, and Commissariat Platoon.
