= 32nd Signal Regiment (Italy) =

Active Italian Army signal unit

- 32° Reggimento Trasmissioni
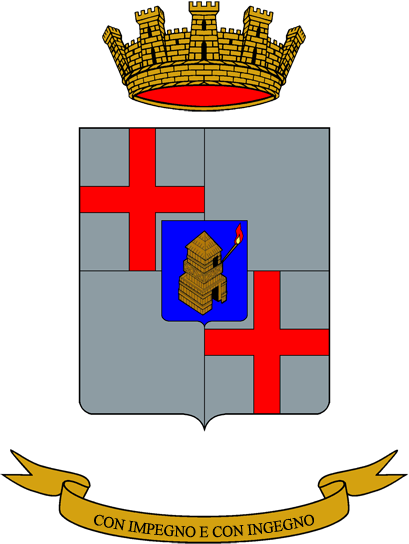
- Regimental coat of arms
- Active: 15 Oct. 1975 — today
- Country: Italy
- Branch: Italian Army
- Role: Military signals
- Part of: Signal Command
- Garrison/HQ: Padua
- Motto: "Forte animo ed agile mente"
- Anniversaries: 20 June 1918 - Second Battle of the Piave River
- Decorations: 1× Bronze Cross of Army Merit

Insignia
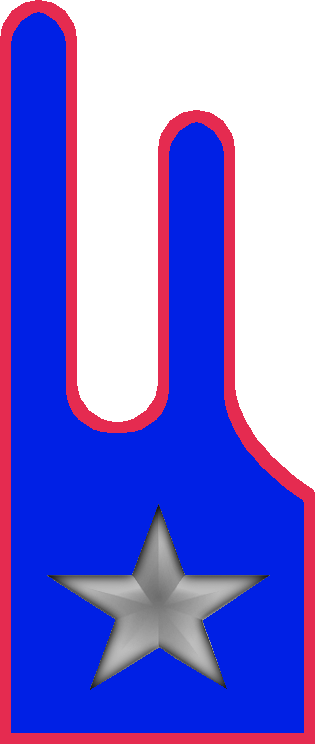
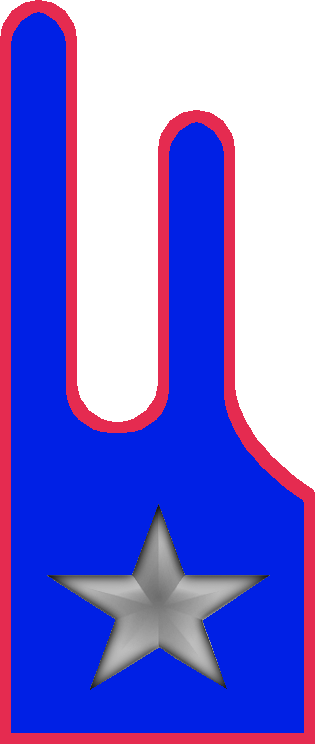
- Signallers gorget patches

The 32nd Signal Regiment (Italian: 32° Reggimento Trasmissioni) is a national support signals regiment of the Italian Army based in Padua in Veneto and Turin in Piedmont. The unit was formed in 1953 as an operational signal battalion and assigned to the Signal Command of the Command Designated "3rd Army". In 1972, the Command Designated "3rd Army" was disbanded and the battalion was assigned to the V Territorial Military Command. In 1975, the battalion was transferred to the 5th Army Corps and named for the Valles Pass. The same year the battalion received its own flag. In 1992, the battalion was reorganized as a national support signal battalion and took over the tasks and personnel of the disbanded 42nd Signal Battalion "Pordoi". The same year the battalion lost its autonomy and entered the newly formed 32nd Signal Regiment. In 1998, the regiment received the Signal Battalion "Frejus" from the disbanded 41st Signal Regiment. Today the regiment is assigned to the army's Signal Command and operates the army's telecommunications network in Northern Italy. The regiment's anniversary falls, as for all signal units, on 20 June 1918, the day the Austro-Hungarian Army began its retreat across the Piave river during the Second Battle of the Piave River.

== History ==
=== Cold War ===
On 20 June 1953, the XXXII Army Signal Operations Battalion was formed in Padua. The battalion was assigned to the Signal Command of the Command Designated "3rd Army" and consisted of a command, a command company, a radio operations company, a phone line operations company, a line construction company, and a mixed company. On 15 January 1954, the battalion was renamed XXXII Army Signal Battalion.

On 31 December 1969, the XXXII Army Signal Battalion was split to form the next day two new battalions: the XXXI Army Signal Battalion (Operations), which received the radio operations company and phone line operations company, and the XXXII Army Signal Battalion (Mixed), which received the line construction company and the mixed company. The original battalion's command company was split to form two command and services platoons, one for each of the two new battalions. On 1 January 1970, after the split, the XXXII Army Signal Battalion (Mixed) consisted of a command, a command and services platoon, the 1st Operations Company (Reserve), the 2nd Radio Relay Company, the 3rd Line Construction Company, and the Mixed Electronic Warfare Company. The XXXI Army Signal Battalion (Operations) consisted of a command, a command and services platoon, the 1st Signal Center Company, the 2nd Signal Center Company (Reserve), and the 3rd Radio Operations Company. In case of war with Yugoslavia the two battalions would have entered the 3rd Army Signal Regiment, which would have been formed upon the beginning of hostilities by the Signal Command of the Command Designated "3rd Army".

On 31 August 1970, the Mixed Electronic Warfare Company left the battalion and the next day became an autonomous unit. On 5 February 1975, the Mixed Electronic Warfare Company entered the newly formed XXXIII Electronic Warfare Battalion. On 31 March 1972, the Command Designated "3rd Army" and the XXXI Army Signal Battalion (Operations) were disbanded. The next day the XXXII Army Signal Battalion (Mixed) was renamed XXXII Signal Battalion and assigned to the V Territorial Military Command. At the time the battalion consisted of a command, a command and services platoon, and three signal companies.

During the 1975 army reform the army disbanded the regimental level and newly independent battalions were granted for the first time their own flags. During the reform signal battalions were renamed for mountain passes. On 15 October 1975, the XXXII Signal Battalion was renamed 32nd Signal Battalion "Valles". The battalion was named for the Valles Pass, which connects Predazzo in Trentino with Falcade in the Veneto. On 12 November 1976, the President of the Italian Republic Giovanni Leone granted with decree 846 the battalion a flag. Afterwards the battalion consisted of a command, a command and services platoon, the 1st Operations Company, the 2nd Radio Relay Company, and the 3rd Radio Relay Company.

=== Recent times ===
On 18 February 1992, the battalion received the personnel and materiel of the disbanded 42nd Signal Battalion "Pordoi" and became a national support signal unit. On 12 September 1992, the 32nd Signal Battalion "Valles" lost its autonomy and the next day the battalion entered the newly formed 32nd Signal Regiment as Signal Battalion "Valles". On the same day, the flag of the 32nd Signal Battalion "Valles" was transferred from the battalion to the 32nd Signal Regiment.

On 19 May 1998, the regiment was assigned to the army's C4 IEW Command. On 1 October 1998, the regiment received the Signal Battalion "Frejus" from the disbanded 41st Signal Regiment in Turin. On 1 June 1999, the Signal Speciality left the Italian Army's Engineer Arm and was elevated to Signal Arm.

== Organization ==
As of 2024 the 32nd Signal Regiment is organized as follows:

- 32nd Signal Regiment, in Padua
  - Command and Logistic Support Company, in Padua
  - Signal Battalion "Valles", in Padua
    - 1st Signal Company — Area Support
    - 2nd Signal Company — C4 Systems Center
  - Signal Battalion "Frejus", in Turin
    - Command and Logistic Support Company
    - 3rd Signal Company — Area Support
    - 4th Signal Company — C4 Systems Center
  - 13th C4 Maintenance Unit, in Turin
    - C4 Maintenance Detachment, in Milan
  - 21st C4 Maintenance Unit, in Padua
    - C4 Maintenance Detachment, in Udine
    - C4 Maintenance Detachment, in Bolzano
  - Computer Incident Response Team, in Padua

The Battalion "Valles" covers Veneto, Trentino-Alto Adige/Südtirol and Friuli-Venezia Giulia, while the Battalion "Frejus" covers Piedmont, Aosta, Lombardy, and Liguria.
