= 9th Cybernetic Security Regiment "Rombo" =

Active Italian Army cyberwar unit

- 9° Reggimento Sicurezza Cibernetica "Rombo"
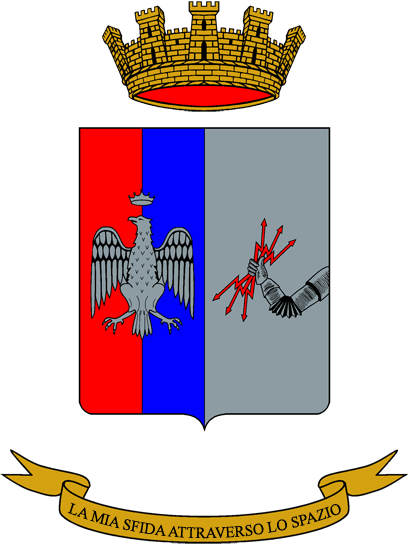
- Regimental coat of arms
- Active: 1 Sept. 1976 — 1 Jan. 1998; 9 Oct. 2023 — today
- Country: Italy
- Branch: Italian Army
- Role: Cyber warfare
- Part of: Tactical Intelligence Brigade
- Garrison/HQ: Cecchignola
- Motto: "La mia sfida attraverso lo spazio"
- Anniversaries: 20 June 1918 - Second Battle of the Piave River

Insignia
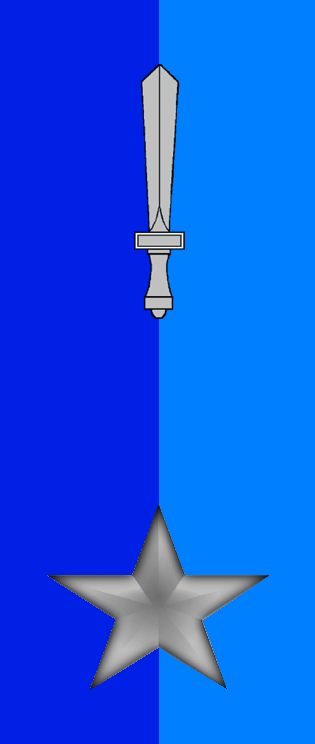
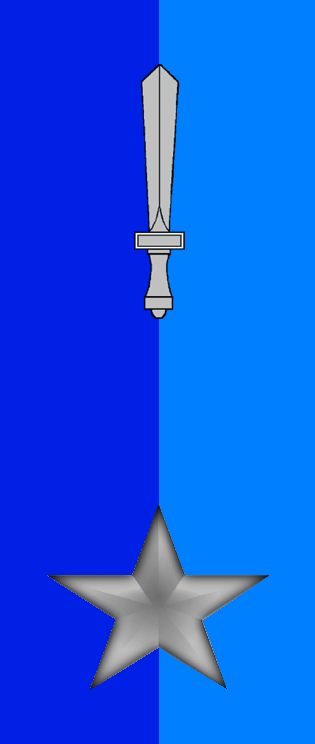
- Regimental gorget patches

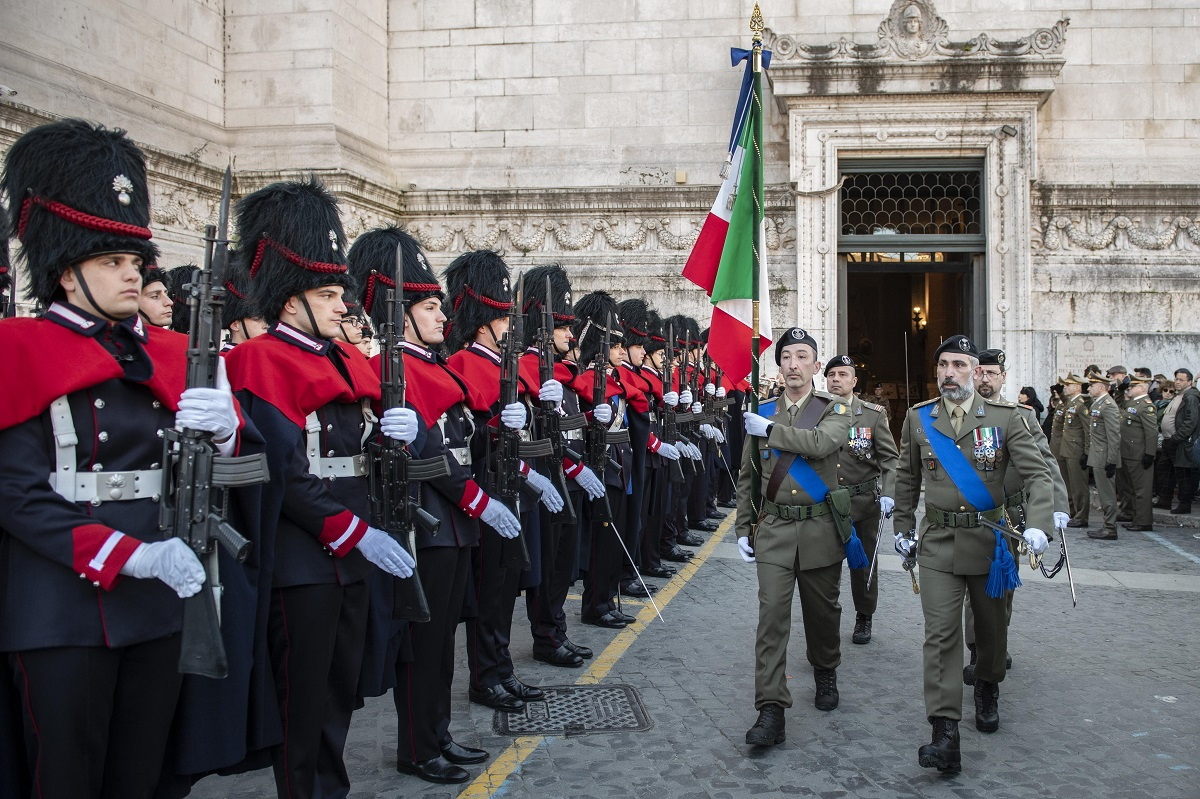
The flag of the 9th Electronic Warfare Battalion "Rombo" is retrieved from the Shrine of the Flags in the Vittoriano in Rome

The 9th Cybernetic Security Regiment "Rombo" (Italian: 9° Reggimento Sicurezza Cibernetica "Rombo") is a cyber warfare unit of the Italian Army based in Cecchignola in Rome. The regiment is part of the Signal Arm and assigned to the Tactical Intelligence Brigade. The regiment is tasked with performing cyber operations related to the defense of the Italian Army's IT networks and Command-and-Control systems, and with the protection of critical infrastructures, platforms and weapon systems.

On 9 October 2023, the existing Cybernetic Security Unit was assigned the name, flag and traditions of the 9th Electronic Warfare Battalion "Rombo". Consequently, the unit was renamed 9th Cybernetic Security Regiment "Rombo". The 9th Electronic Warfare Battalion "Rombo" was formed in 1959 as IX Signal Battalion and assigned to the Italian Army's General Staff. In 1975, the battalion was named for the Timmelsjoch Pass (Italian: Passo Rombo) and received its own flag. The battalion was the army's strategic electronic warfare unit during the Cold War. In 1998, the battalion was disbanded and its personnel and tasks transferred to the Italian Army's 33rd Electronic Warfare Battalion "Falzarego" and the Italian Armed Forces' Information and Security Department. The regiment's anniversary falls, as for all signal units, on 20 June 1918, the day the Austro-Hungarian Army began its retreat across the Piave river during the Second Battle of the Piave River.

== History ==
=== Cold War ===
On 15 April 1955, the Ministry of Defense-Army Special Signal Battalion formed the Special Signal I-RG Company in Rome, which was tasked with interception and radio direction finding (Italian: Intercettazione-RadioGoniometria). On 1 March 1957, the Italian Army's Signal School in Rome expanded its Signal Experimentation Company to XI Signal Battalion. On 1 April 1959, the XI Signal Battalion was disbanded and the battalion's personnel formed, together with the Special Signal I-RG Company, the IX Signal Battalion.

On 1 October 1961, the IX Signal Battalion moved from Rome to Anzio. On 1 December 1963, the battalion was assigned to the newly formed Electronic Defense Center. On 1 September 1970, the battalion was renamed IX Electronic Warfare Battalion.

During the 1975 army reform the army disbanded the regimental level and battalions were granted for the first time their own flags. During the reform signal battalions were renamed for mountain passes. On 1 September 1976, the IX Electronic Warfare Battalion was renamed 9th Electronic Warfare Battalion "Rombo" (Italian: 9° Battaglione Guerra Elettronica "Rombo"). The battalion was named for the Timmelsjoch Pass (Italian: Passo Rombo), which connects the Passeiertal valley in the Italian province of South Tyrol with the Ötztal valley in Austria. On the same day, the Electronic Defense Center's Signals Intelligence Unit was reorganized as 8th Signals Intelligence Battalion "Tonale".

The 9th Electronic Warfare Battalion "Rombo" consisted of a command, a command and services platoon, communications company, and a communications-denial battery. On 12 November 1976, the President of the Italian Republic Giovanni Leone granted with decree 846 the battalion a flag. The flags of the 8th Signals Intelligence Battalion "Tonale", 9th Electronic Warfare Battalion "Rombo", and Electronic Defense Center arrived at the units' bases on 22 March 1977.

=== Recent times ===
On 1 January 1998, the 9th Electronic Warfare Battalion "Rombo" was disbanded and its personnel transferred either to the Italian Army's 33rd Electronic Warfare Battalion "Falzarego" or the Information and Security Department of the Italian Armed Forces' General Staff. The battalion's flag was transferred to the Shrine of the Flags in the Vittoriano in Rome for safekeeping.

On 1 April 2019, the Cybernetic Security Unit was formed in Cecchignola in Rome and assigned to the Army Signal Command. On 20 June 2019, the unit reached Initial Operational Capability. Five years later, on 20 October 2024, the unit reached full operational capability.

On 9 October 2023, the name, flag and traditions of the 9th Electronic Warfare Battalion "Rombo" were assigned to the Cybernetic Security Unit, which upon receiving the flag was renamed 9th Cybernetic Security Regiment "Rombo".

== Organization ==
According to defense Under Secretary Angelo Tofalo, the 9th Cybernetic Security Regiment "Rombo" is organized as follows:

- 9th Cybernetic Security Regiment "Rombo", in Rome
  - Command and Support Company
  - Cybernetic Security Battalion
    - 1st Cybernetic Security Company
    - 2nd Cybernetic Security Company
    - Training and Innovation Section

== See also ==
- Comando Interforze per le Operazioni Cibernetiche
- List of cyber warfare forces
- Tactical Intelligence Brigade (Italy)
