= 42nd Signal Battalion "Pordoi" =

Italian Army signal unit

- 42° Battaglione Trasmissioni "Pordoi"
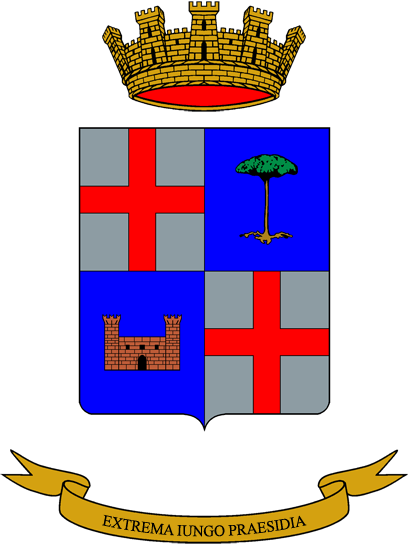
- Battalion coat of arms
- Active: 15 Oct. 1975 — 18 Sept. 1993
- Country: Italy
- Branch: Italian Army
- Role: Military signals
- Part of: 2nd Alpine Signal Regiment
- Garrison/HQ: Bolzano
- Motto: "Extrema iungo praesidia"
- Anniversaries: 20 June 1918 - Second Battle of the Piave River

Insignia
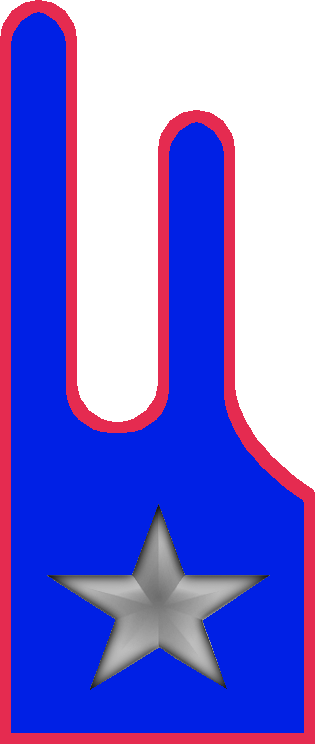
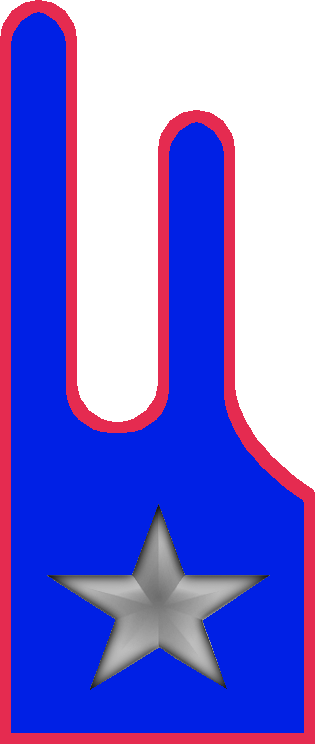
- Signallers gorget patches

The 42nd Signal Battalion "Pordoi" (Italian: 42° Battaglione Trasmissioni "Pordoi") is a signals battalion of the Italian Army. The battalion was formed in 1953 and operated the army's telecommunications network in the Friuli-Venezia Giulia, Trentino-Alto Adige/Südtirol, and Veneto regions. In 1975, the battalion was named for the Pordoi Pass and received its own flag. In 1993, the battalion was disbanded and its personnel and tasks transferred to the 32nd Signal Regiment. In 2001, the battalion was reformed and assigned to the 2nd Alpine Signal Regiment as the regiment's second signal battalion. The battalion's anniversary falls, as for all signal units, on 20 June 1918, the day the Austro-Hungarian Army began its retreat across the Piave river during the Second Battle of the Piave River.

== History ==
=== Cold War ===
On 1 October 1953, the 5th Territorial Signal Company in Padua was expanded to Territorial Signal Battalion. The battalion consisted of a command, a command company, the 1st and 2nd radio operations companies, a phone line operations company, a signal center, and two dovecotes in Padua and Mantua. The battalion was assigned to the V Territorial Military Command.

On 1 October 1957, the battalion was renamed XLII Signal Battalion and incorporated the personnel and materiel of the disbanded 4th Territorial Signal Company in Bolzano. Afterwards the battalion consisted of a command, a command and services platoon, and four signal companies, one of which was detached to Bolzano.

During the 1975 army reform the army disbanded the regimental level and newly independent battalions were granted for the first time their own flags. During the reform signal battalions were renamed for mountain passes. On 15 October 1975, the XLII Signal Battalion was renamed 42nd Signal Battalion "Pordoi". The battalion was named for the Pordoi Pass, which connects Arabba in the province of Belluno with Canazei in the province of Trentino. After the reform the battalion consisted of a command, a command and services platoon, and four signal companies, one of which was detached to Bolzano. The battalion was assigned to the Northeastern Military Region's Signal Command and operated the army's telecommunications network in the Friuli-Venezia Giulia, Trentino-Alto Adige, and Veneto regions and the two Lombardy provinces of Brescia and Mantova. On 12 November 1976, the President of the Italian Republic Giovanni Leone granted with decree 846 the battalion a flag.

At the end of 1989, the battalion's Command and Services Platoon was expanded to Command and Services Company. Afterwards the battalion consisted of a command, a Command and Services Company, the 1st TLC Infrastructure Managing Company, the 2nd TLC Infrastructure Managing Company, the 3rd TLC Infrastructure Managing Company, and the 4th TLC Infrastructure Managing Company, which was detached to Bolzano. On 18 September 1993, the battalion was disbanded and its personnel and tasks transferred to the 32nd Signal Regiment. Three days later, on 21 September 1993, the flag of the 42nd Signal Battalion "Pordoi" was transferred to the Shrine of the Flags in the Vittoriano in Rome for safekeeping.

=== Recent times ===
On 26 September 2001, the battalion was reformed as Signal Battalion "Pordoi" and assigned to the 2nd Signal Regiment as the regiment's second signal battalion.
