= 8th Signals Intelligence Battalion "Tonale" =

Italian Army signal unit

- 8° Battaglione Trasmissioni Ricerca Elettronica "Tonale"
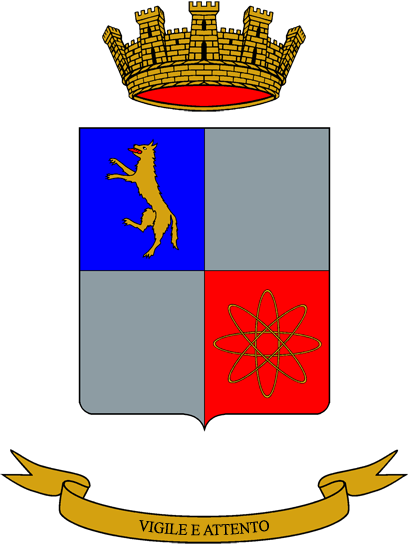
- Battalion coat of arms
- Active: 1 Sept. 1976 — 1 Jan. 1998
- Country: Italy
- Branch: Italian Army
- Role: Signals Intelligence
- Part of: 11th Signal Regiment
- Garrison/HQ: Civitavecchia
- Motto(s): "Vigile e attento"
- Anniversaries: 20 June 1918 - Second Battle of the Piave River

Insignia
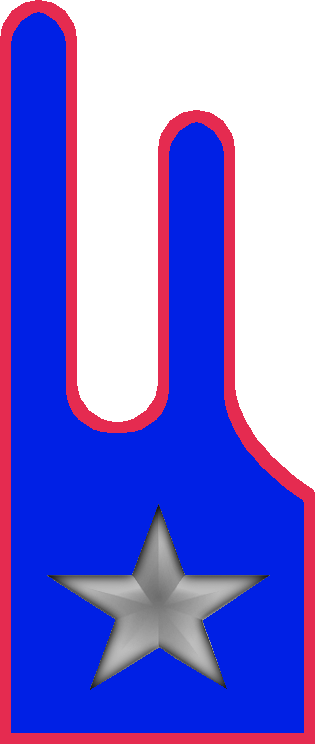
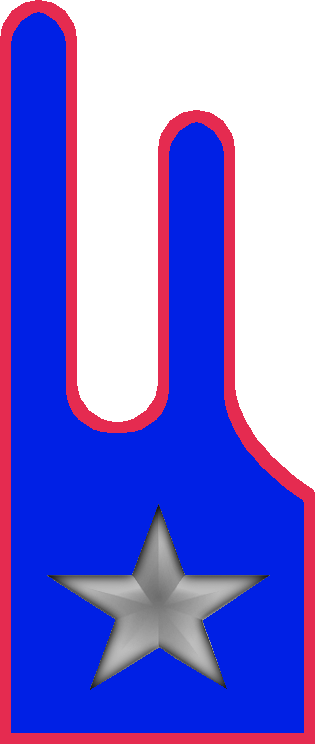
- Signallers gorget patches

The 8th Signals Intelligence Battalion "Tonale" (Italian: 8° Battaglione Trasmissioni Ricerca Elettronica "Tonale") is a former signals intelligence (SIGINT) and currently signals battalion of the Italian Army. The battalion was formed in 1976 and named for the Tonale Pass. The battalion was the army's strategic signals intelligence unit during the Cold War. In 1998, he battalion was disbanded and its tasks and personnel transferred to the Italian Army's 33rd Electronic Warfare Battalion "Falzarego" and the Italian Armed Forces' Information and Security Department. In 2001, the battalion was reformed and assigned to the 11th Signal Regiment as the regiment's second signal battalion. The battalion's anniversary falls, as for all signal units, on 20 June 1918, the day the Austro-Hungarian Army began its retreat across the Piave river during the Second Battle of the Piave River.

== History ==
=== Cold War ===
On 1 September 1970, the army's Electronic Defense Center in Anzio formed a Signals Intelligence Team (Italian: Nucleo SIGINT). On 1 November 1972, the team was expanded to SIGINT Unit and began to build signal interception stations all over Italy.

During the 1975 army reform the army disbanded the regimental level and battalions were granted for the first time their own flags. During the reform signal battalions were renamed for mountain passes. On 1 September 1976, the SIGINT Unit was renamed 8th Signals Intelligence Battalion "Tonale". The battalion was named for the Tonale Pass, which connects the Val di Sole valley in the Italian province of Trentino with the Valcamonica valley in Lombardy. On the same day the Electronic Defense Center's IX Electronic Warfare Battalion was renamed 9th Electronic Warfare Battalion "Rombo".

The battalion became the spiritual successor of the Special Marconisti Battalion, which had been formed by the 8th Engineer Regiment during World War II, and was the Royal Italian Army General Staff's signal interception and radio direction finding battalion. The 8th Signals Intelligence Battalion "Tonale" consisted of a command, a command and services platoon, and two SIGINT companies. On 12 November 1976, the President of the Italian Republic Giovanni Leone granted with decree 846 the battalion a flag. The flags of the 8th Signals Intelligence Battalion "Tonale", 9th Electronic Warfare Battalion "Rombo", and Electronic Defense Center arrived at the units' bases on 22 March 1977.

On 2 January 1987, the 8th Signals Intelligence Battalion "Tonale" doubled in size and consisted afterwards of a command, a command and services company, and four SIGINT companies.

=== Recent times ===
On 1 January 1998, the 8th Signals Intelligence Battalion "Tonale" was disbanded and its personnel transferred either to the Italian Army's 33rd Electronic Warfare Battalion "Falzarego" or the Information and Security Department of the Italian Armed Forces' General Staff. The battalion's flag was transferred to the Shrine of the Flags in the Vittoriano in Rome for safekeeping.

On 27 August 2001, the battalion was reformed as Signal Battalion "Tonale" and assigned to the 11th Signal Regiment as the regiment's second signal battalion.
