= 11th Signal Regiment (Italy) =

Active Italian Army signal unit

- 11° Reggimento Trasmissioni
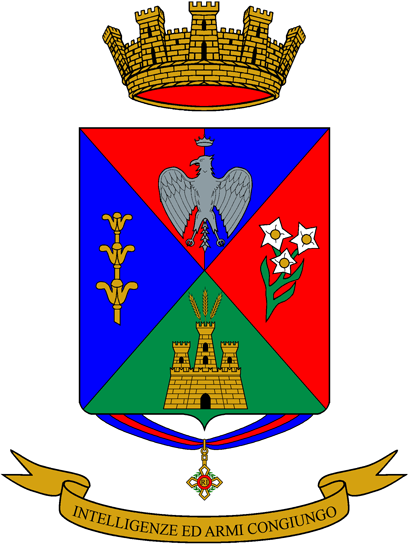
- Regimental coat of arms
- Active: 31 Dec. 1975 — today
- Country: Italy
- Branch: Italian Army
- Role: Military signals
- Part of: Signal Command
- Garrison/HQ: Civitavecchia
- Motto(s): "Intelligenze ed armi congiungo"
- Anniversaries: 20 June 1918 - Second Battle of the Piave River
- Decorations: 1× Military Order of Italy; 1× Gold Cross of Army Merit; 1× Silver Cross of Army Merit

Insignia
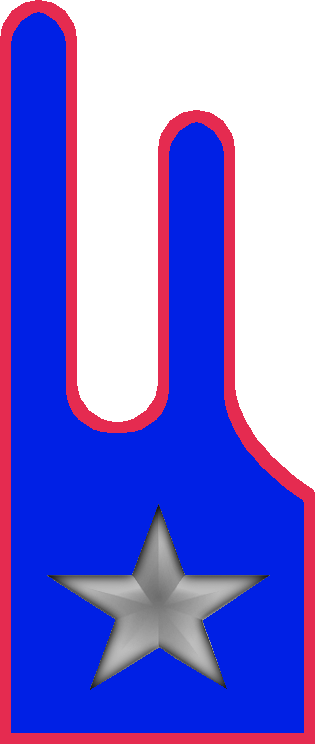
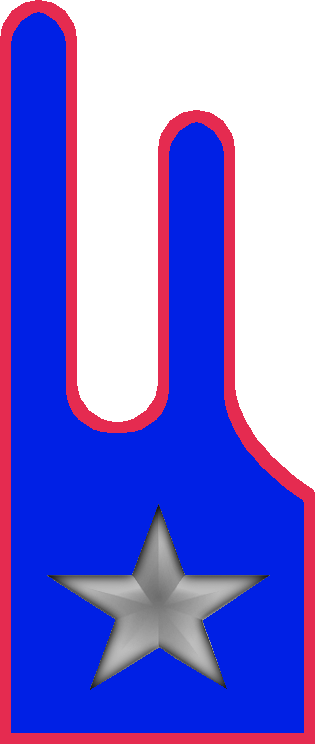
- Signallers gorget patches

The 11th Signal Regiment (Italian: 11° Reggimento Trasmissioni) is an expeditionary signals regiment of the Italian Army based in Civitavecchia in Lazio. The unit was formed in 1972 as a battalion and given the number XI, which had been used by two signal battalions during World War II: one of which, had served in the Western Desert campaign and Tunisian campaign; while the other had served during the Allied invasion of Sicily. The reformed battalion was assigned to the Army General Staff's Signal Inspectorate. In 1975, the battalion was named for the Sella di Leonessa Pass and received its own flag. In 1992, the battalion lost its autonomy and entered the newly formed 11th Signal Regiment. In 2001, the regiment reformed the Signal Battalion "Tonale" as its second signal battalion. The regiment is assigned to the army's Signal Command and affiliated with the Army Special Forces Command. The regiment's anniversary falls, as for all signal units, on 20 June 1918, the day the Austro-Hungarian Army began its retreat across the Piave river during the Second Battle of the Piave River.

== History ==
=== World War II ===
After the outbreak of World War II the Territorial Defense Command in Rome formed, on 4 July 1940, the command of the XI Army Connections Battalion. The battalion was assigned to the 12th Engineer Regiment in Palermo, which provided the remaining personnel. On 23 July 1940, the battalion was renamed XI Marconisti Battalion, and consisted of the 124th Marconisti Company, the 127th Marconisti Company, and the 137th Special Marconisti Company.

The battalion was sent to Libya, where it fought in the Western Desert campaign. In October 1942, at the eve of the Second Battle of El Alamein, the battalion consisted of the 110th, 120th, and 127th Marconisti companies. After the Italo-German Panzer Army Africa was defeated at El Alamein the battalion retreated with the remaining Axis forced to Tunisia, where the battalion was disbanded and its personnel assigned to other units.

On 5 January 1943, the battalion was reformed by the 12th Engineer Regiment as VI Army Marconisti Battalion. Two days later the battalion was renamed XI Army Marconisti Battalion. The reformed battalion consisted of the 140th Marconisti Company and 154th Marconisti Connection Company. The battalion was assigned to the Italian 6th Army, which was tasked with the defense of Sicily. During the night of 9 to 10 July 1943, allied forces landed in Sicily and the battalion, which was assigned to the 9th Engineer Grouping, operated in the area of Enna. During the following weeks the battalion suffered heavy losses and in August 1943 the battalion was disbanded a second time.

=== Cold War ===
On 1 March 1957, the army's Signal School in Rome reformed the battalion as XI Signal Battalion by expanding the schools' Signal Experimentation Company. Already on 1 April 1959, the battalion was disbanded and its personnel used to form the IX Signal Battalion in Anzio.

On 31 March 1972, the VI Army Corps in Bologna was disbanded and the next day, on 1 April 1971, the corps' VI Signal Battalion was renamed XI Signal Battalion. The battalion was assigned to the Army General Staff's Signals Inspectorate and consisted of a command, a command and services platoon, and three signal companies.

During the 1975 army reform the army disbanded the regimental level and newly independent battalions were granted for the first time their own flags. During the reform signal battalions were renamed for mountain passes. On 31 December 1975 the XI Signal Battalion was renamed 11th Signal Battalion "Leonessa". The battalion was named for the Sella di Leonessa Pass, which connects the Rieti and Leonessa. At the time the battalion consisted of a command, a command and services platoon, and three signal companies. The battalion was assigned to the Army General Staff's Signals Inspectorate and had operational functions, while territorial tasks were assigned to the 10th Signal Battalion "Lanciano". On 19 July 1976, the battalion moved from Bologna to Civitavecchia. On 12 November 1976, the President of the Italian Republic Giovanni Leone granted with decree 846 the battalion a flag.

In 1980, the battalion was transferred from the Signals Inspectorate to the Central Military Region, but in 1983 the battalion returned to the Signals Inspectorate. Around the same the battalion's Command and Services Platoon was expanded to Command and Services Company.

=== Recent times ===
On 31 August 1992, the 11th Signal Battalion "Leonessa" lost its autonomy and the next day the battalion entered the newly formed 11th Signal Regiment as Signal Battalion "Leonessa". On the same day, the flag of the 11th Signal Battalion "Leonessa" was transferred from the battalion to the 11th Signal Regiment. On 1 June 1999, the Signal Speciality left the Italian Army's Engineer Arm and was elevated to Signal Arm.

In 2000, the regiment was assigned to the army's C4 IEW Command. On 27 August 2001, the regiment reformed the Signal Battalion "Tonale" as its second signal battalion. Since then the regiment is an expeditionary signal regiment capable to deploy and operate outside Italy.

== Organization ==
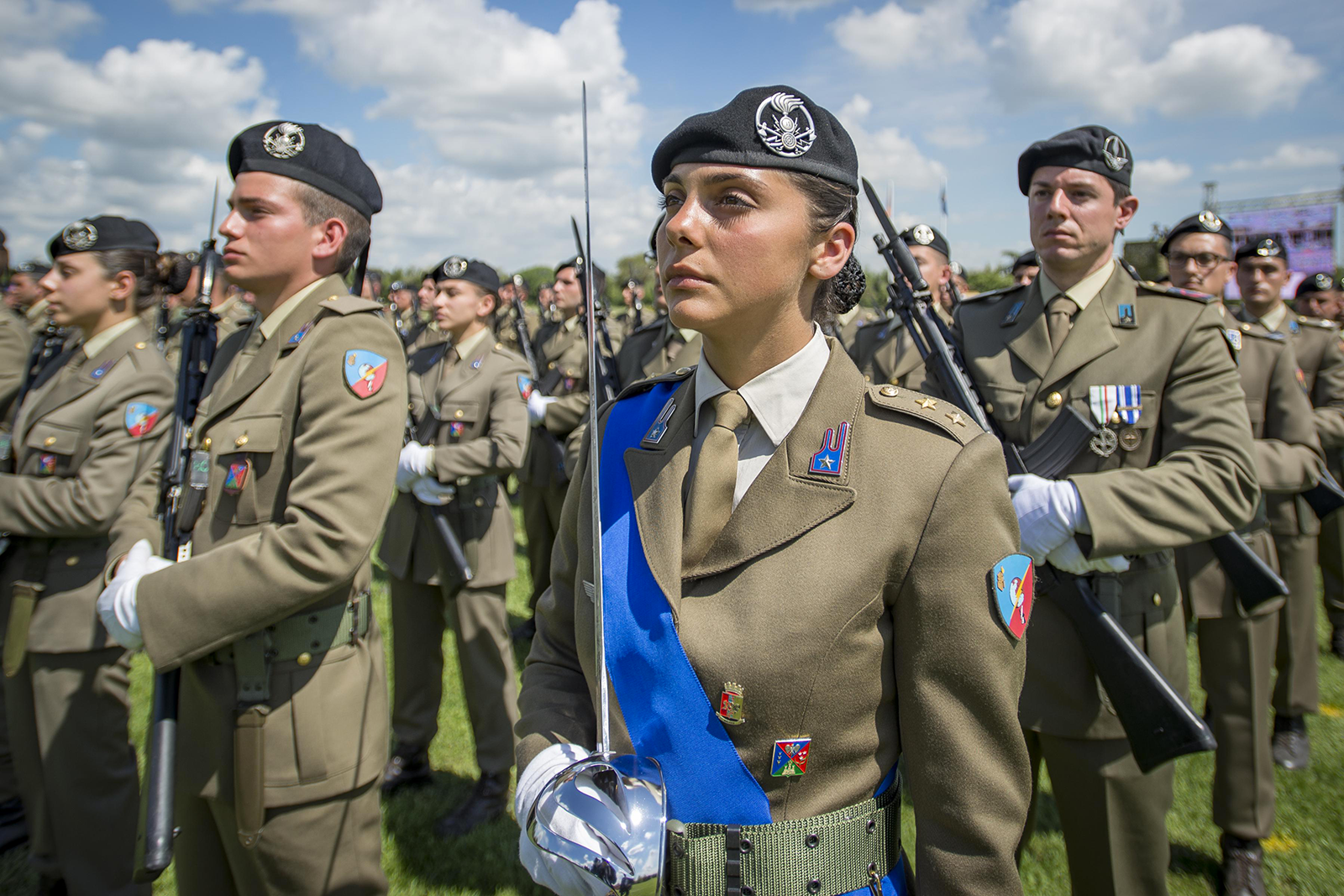
11th Signal Regiment troops at the Italian Army's 156th birthday celebration 2017

As of 2024 the 11th Signal Regiment is organized as follows:

- 11th Signal Regiment, in Civitavecchia
  - Command and Logistic Support Company
  - Signal Battalion "Leonessa"
    - 1st Signal Company
    - 2nd Signal Company
    - 3rd Signal Company
  - Signal Battalion "Tonale"
    - 4th Signal Company
    - 5th Signal Company
    - 6th Signal Company
