= 41st Signal Regiment (Italy) =

Italian Army signal unit

- 41° Reggimento Trasmissioni
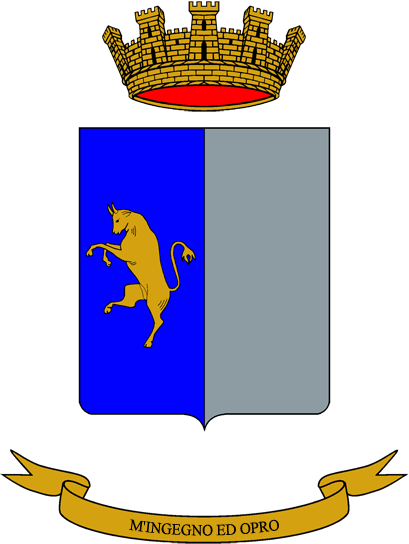
- Regimental coat of arms
- Active: 1 December 1975 — 30 Sept. 1998
- Country: Italy
- Branch: Italian Army
- Role: Military signals
- Part of: 32nd Signal Regiment
- Garrison/HQ: Turin
- Motto(s): "M'ingegno ed opro"
- Anniversaries: 20 June 1918 - Second Battle of the Piave River

Insignia
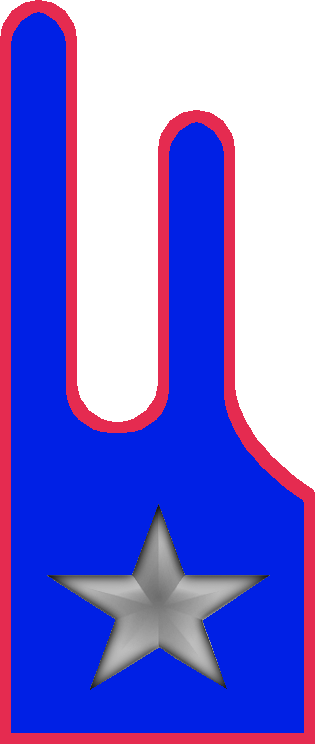
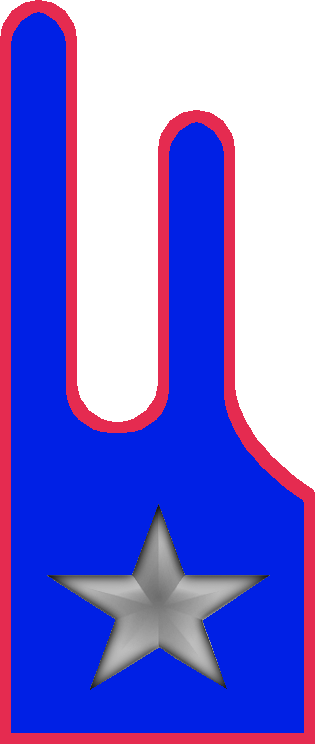
- Signallers gorget patches

The 41st Signal Regiment (Italian: 41° Reggimento Trasmissioni) is an signals regiment of the Italian Army. The unit was formed as a battalion in 1953 and operated the army's telecommunications network in the Aosta, Liguria, Lombardy, and Piedmont regions. In 1975, the battalion was named for the Col du Fréjus and received its own flag. In 1993, the battalion lost its autonomy and entered the newly formed 41st Signal Regiment. In 1998, the 41st Signal Regiment was disbanded and the Signal Battalion "Frejus" transferred to the 32nd Signal Regiment. The regiment's anniversary falls, as for all signal units, on 20 June 1918, the day the Austro-Hungarian Army began its retreat across the Piave river during the Second Battle of the Piave River.

== History ==
=== Cold War ===
On 1 October 1957, the XLI Signal Battalion was formed in Turin with the personnel and materiel of the existing 1st, 2nd, and 3rd territorial signal companies. The battalion consisted of a command, a command and services platoon, and three signals companies. The battalion was assigned to the I Territorial Military Command in Turin.

During the 1975 army reform the army disbanded the regimental level and newly independent battalions were granted for the first time their own flags. During the reform signal battalions were renamed for mountain passes. On 1 December 1975, the XLI Signal Battalion was renamed to 41st Signal Battalion "Frejus". The battalion was named for the Col du Fréjus, which connects Bardonecchia in Piedmont with Modane in France. After the reform the battalion consisted of a command, a command and services platoon, and three signal companies. The battalion was assigned to the Northwestern Military Region's Signal Command and operated the army's telecommunications network in the Aosta, Liguria (minus the province of La Spezia), Lombardy (minus the provinces of Brescia and Mantua), and Piedmont regions. On 12 November 1976, the President of the Italian Republic Giovanni Leone granted with decree 846 the battalion a flag.

On 30 September 1987, the battalion was reorganized and consisted afterwards of a command, command and services company, the 1st TLC Infrastructure Managing Company, and the 2nd TLC Infrastructure Managing Company, which was detached to Milan. On 1 October 1988, the battalion added the 3rd Field Support Company.

=== Recent times ===
On 19 September 1993, the 41st Signal Battalion "Frejus" lost its autonomy and the next day the battalion entered the newly formed 41st Signal Regiment as Signal Battalion "Frejus". On the same day, the flag of the 41st Signal Battalion "Frejus" was transferred from the battalion to the 41st Signal Regiment. The newly formed regiment continued to operate the army's telecommunications network in northwestern Italy.

On 30 September 1998, the 41st Signal Regiment was disbanded and the next day the Signal Battalion "Frejus" joined the 32nd Signal Regiment, which at the time operated the army's telecommunications network in northeastern Italy. Since then the 32nd Signal Regiment operates the army's telecommunications network in all of northern Italy, with the exception of the Emilia-Romagna region. Subsequently, the flag of the 41st Signal Regiment was transferred to the Shrine of the Flags in the Vittoriano in Rome for safekeeping.

== Organization ==
As of 2024 the Signal Battalion "Frejus" is organized as follows:

- Signal Battalion "Frejus", in Turin
  - Command and Logistic Support Company
  - 3rd Signal Company — Area Support
  - 4th Signal Company — C4 Systems Center
