= 43rd Signal Regiment (Italy) =

Italian Army signal unit

- 43° Reggimento Trasmissioni
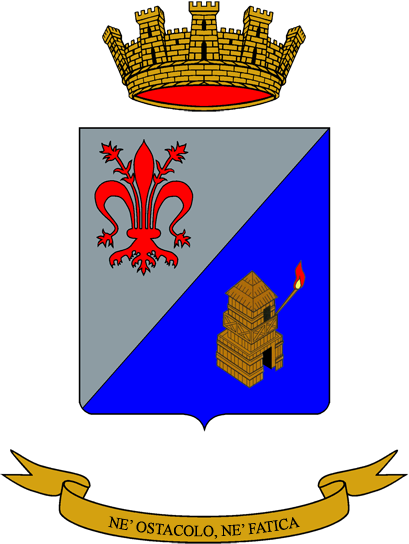
- Regimental coat of arms
- Active: 1 Oct. 1975 — 8 Sept. 1998
- Country: Italy
- Branch: Italian Army
- Role: Military signals
- Part of: 3rd Signal Regiment
- Garrison/HQ: Florence
- Motto(s): "Né ostacolo, né fatica"
- Anniversaries: 20 June 1918 - Second Battle of the Piave River

Insignia
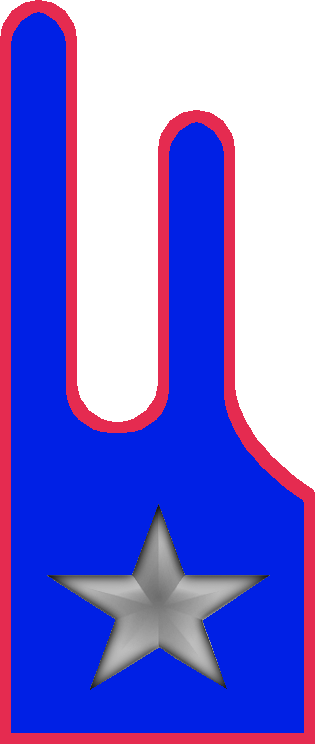
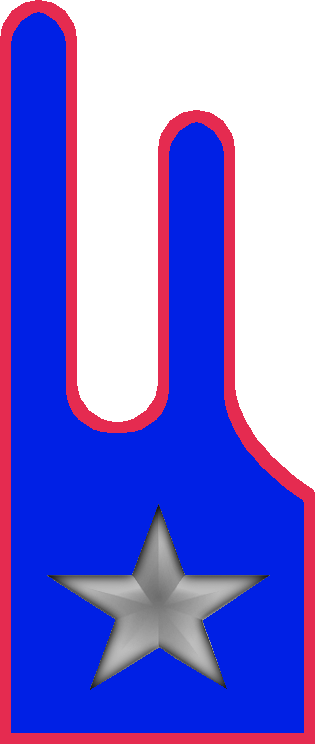
- Signallers gorget patches

The 43rd Signal Regiment (Italian: 43° Reggimento Trasmissioni) is an signals regiment of the Italian Army. The unit was formed as a battalion in 1957 and operated the army's telecommunications network in the Tuscany and Emilia-Romagna regions. In 1975, the battalion was named for the Abetone Pass and received its own flag. In 1993, the battalion lost its autonomy and entered the newly formed 43rd Signal Regiment. In 1998, the 43rd Signal Regiment was disbanded and the Signal Battalion "Abetone" transferred to the 3rd Signal Regiment, which operates the army's telecommunications network in central Italy and on the island of Sardinia. The regiment's anniversary falls, as for all signal units, on 20 June 1918, the day the Austro-Hungarian Army began its retreat across the Piave river during the Second Battle of the Piave River.

== History ==
=== Cold War ===
On 1 October 1957, the XLIII Signal Battalion was formed in Florence with the personnel and materiel of the existing 6th and 7th territorial signal companies. The battalion consisted of a command, a command and services platoon, and three signals companies. The battalion was assigned to the VII Territorial Military Command in Florence.

During the 1975 army reform the army disbanded the regimental level and newly independent battalions were granted for the first time their own flags. During the reform signal battalions were renamed for mountain passes. On 1 October 1975, the XLIII Signal Battalion was renamed to 43rd Signal Battalion "Abetone". The battalion was named for the Abetone Pass, which connects Tuscany with the Emilia-Romagna. After the reform the battalion consisted of a command, a command and services platoon, and three signal companies. The battalion was assigned to the Tuscan-Emilian Military Region's Signal Command and operated the army's telecommunications network in the Emilia-Romagna and Tuscany regions, the Liguria province of La Spezia, and the two Marche provinces of Ancona and Pesaro-Urbino. On 12 November 1976, the President of the Italian Republic Giovanni Leone granted with decree 846 the battalion a flag.

On 1 January 1986, the battalion was reorganized and consisted afterwards of a command, command and services company, the 1st TLC Infrastructure Managing Company, and the 2nd TLC Infrastructure Managing Company, which was detached to Bologna. On 1 April 1987, the battalion added the 3rd Field Support Company.

=== Recent times ===
On 16 September 1993, the 43rd Signal Battalion "Abetone" lost its autonomy and the next day the battalion entered the newly formed 43rd Signal Regiment as Signal Battalion "Abetone". On the same day, the flag of the 43rd Signal Battalion "Abetone" was transferred from the battalion to the 43rd Signal Regiment. The newly formed regiment continued to operate the army's telecommunications network in the Emilia-Romagna and Tuscany regions.

On 8 September 1998, the 43rd Signal Regiment was disbanded and the next day the Signal Battalion "Abetone" joined the 3rd Signal Regiment, which at the time operated the army's telecommunications network in central Italy. Three days later, on 11 September 1998, the flag of the 43rd Signal Regiment was transferred to the Shrine of the Flags in the Vittoriano in Rome for safekeeping. In 2000, the Signal Battalion "Gennargentu" joined the 3rd Signal Regiment, which since then operates the army's telecommunications network in central Italy, the Emilia-Romagna region, and on the island Sardinia.

== Organization ==
As of 2024 the Signal Battalion "Abetone" is organized as follows:

- Signal Battalion "Abetone", in Florence
  - Command and Logistic Support Company
  - 4th Signal Company — Area Support
  - 5th Signal Company — C4 Systems Center
