= NRDC-ITA Support Brigade =

- Brigata di Supporto al NRDC-ITA
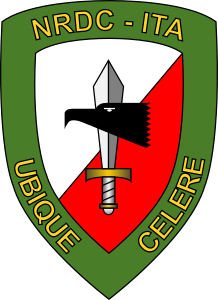
- Coat of Arms of the NRDC-ITA Support Brigade
- Active: 1 October 2001 - present
- Country: Italy
- Allegiance: Italian Army
- Branch: Army
- Type: Combat service support Combat support
- Size: Brigade
- Part of: NATO Rapid Deployable Corps – Italy
- Garrison/HQ: Solbiate Olona
- Motto: Ubique Celere ("Everywhere rapidly")

The NRDC-ITA Support Brigade is a support brigade of the Italian Army. Originally raised on 1 October 2001 as Signal Brigade (renamed NRDC-ITA Support Brigade on 30 September 2007) the unit's mission since its inception has been to support the NATO-assigned Rapid Deployable Corps – Italy (NRDC-ITA). Unlike the multi-national staff of the NRDC-ITA the brigade is manned exclusively by Italian personnel. The brigade deployed to Afghanistan in 2006, 2009 and 2013.

== Organization ==
As of the 2023 the brigade is organized as follows:

- NRDC-ITA Support Brigade, in Solbiate Olona
  - 1st Signal Regiment, in Milan
    - Battalion "Spluga"
    - Battalion "Sempione"
  - 33rd Logistic and Tactical Support Regiment "Ambrosiano", in Solbiate Olona
    - Command and Logistic Support Company
    - Tactical and Logistic Support Battalion
      - Deployment Support Company
      - Transport Company
      - 3rd Bersaglieri Company "Celere"
      - Quartermaster Company

== Gorget patches ==
The personnel of the brigade's units wears the following gorget patches:

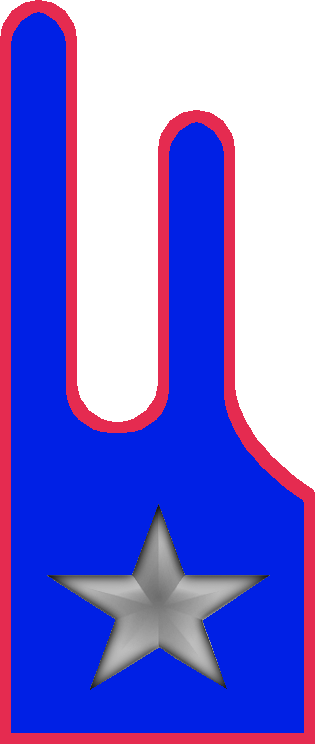
1st Signal Regiment

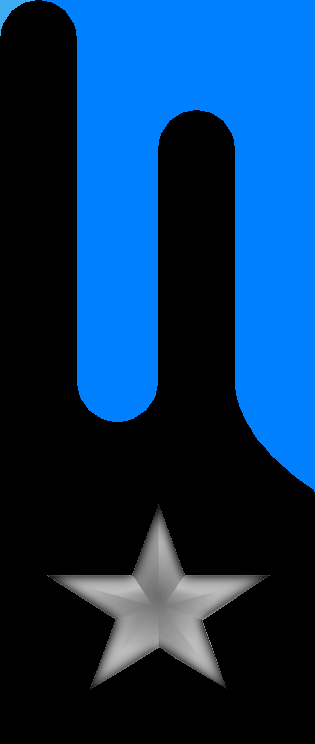
Tactical and Logistic Support Regiment

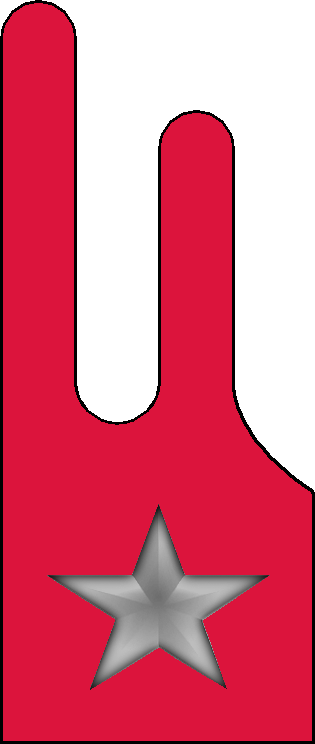
3rd Bersaglieri Company "Celere"

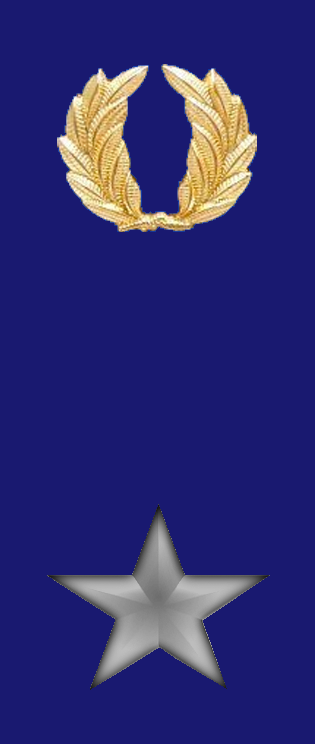
Commissariat Company
