= 1st Signal Regiment (Italy) =

Active Italian Army signal unit

- 1° Reggimento Trasmissioni
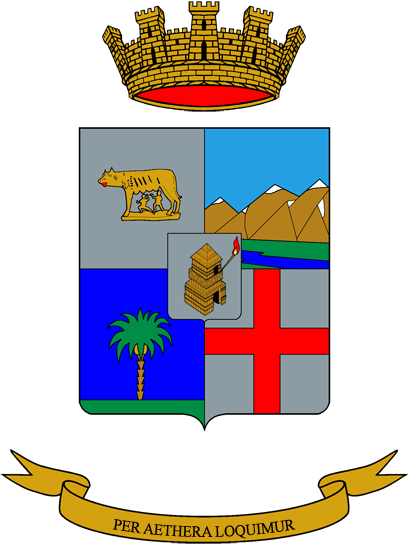
- Regimental coat of arms
- Active: 21 Nov. 1919 — 28 Oct. 1932; 1 Sept. 1975 — today
- Country: Italy
- Branch: Italian Army
- Role: Military signals
- Part of: NRDC-ITA Support Brigade
- Garrison/HQ: Milan
- Motto: "Per aethera loquimor"
- Anniversaries: 20 June 1918 - Second Battle of the Piave River
- Decorations: 1× Silver Cross of Army Merit; 1× Bronze Medal of Civil Merit^{*} * awarded to the 231st Signal Battalion "Sempione"

Insignia
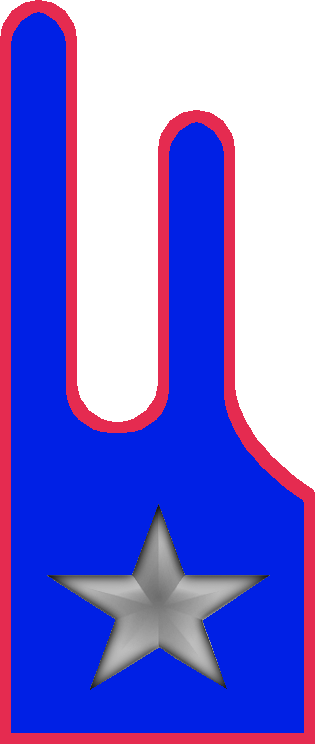
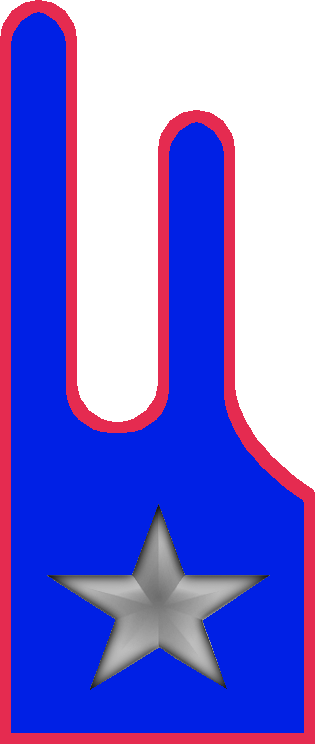
- Signallers gorget patches

The 1st Signal Regiment (Italian: 1° Reggimento Trasmissioni) is an expeditionary signals regiment of the Italian Army based in Milan in Lombardy. The unit was formed in 1906 in Rome as a detached brigade of the 3rd Engineer Regiment (Telegraphers) and tasked with training the army's wireless telegraphy personnel. In 1919, the battalion was expanded to Radio-Telegraphers Engineer Regiment, which split in 1926 to form the 1st Radio-Telegraphers Regiment and 2nd Radio-Telegraphers Regiment. Both regiment were disbanded in 1932.

In 1948, the unit was reformed as a battalion and given the number III, which had been used by two signal battalions during World War II. During the Cold War the battalion was assigned to the III Army Corps. In 1975, the battalion was named for the Splügen Pass (Italian: Passo Spluga) and assigned the flag and traditions of the 1st Radio-Telegraphers Regiment. In 1995, the battalion lost its autonomy and entered the reformed 1st Signal Regiment. In 2001, the regiment reformed the Signal Battalion "Sempione" as its second signal battalion. The regiment is assigned to the army's NRDC-ITA Support Brigade, which supports the NATO Rapid Deployable Corps – Italy. The regiment's anniversary falls, as for all signal units, on 20 June 1918, the day the Austro-Hungarian Army began its retreat across the Piave river during the Second Battle of the Piave River.

== History ==
On 24 February 1906, the 3rd Engineer Regiment (Telegraphers)'s Specialists Brigade in Rome formed a Radio-Telegraphers Section, which trained the Royal Italian Army's radio-telegraphic personnel in the use of spark-gap transmitters. In 1909, the Specialists Brigade an became autonomous unit, which in March 1911 was renamed Specialists Battalion. In 1911–12, the battalion provided ten radio-telegraphic stations for the Italo-Turkish War. In August 1912, the task of training the army's radio-telegraphic service personnel was transferred to the 3rd Engineer Regiment (Telegraphers), while the Specialists Battalion trained the radio-telegraphic personnel of the army's Military Aviation Corps.

=== World War I ===
At the outbreak of World War I the 3rd Engineer Regiment (Telegraphers) mobilized nine radio-telegraphers sections for service on the Italian Front. During the war a further 18 radio-telegraphers sections were formed. In 1918, the Army General Staff ordered the radio-telegraphic services of the army and military aviation corps to merge. Consequently, on 1 July 1918, the Radio-Telegraphers became a speciality of the Royal Italian Army's Engineer Corps and on the same day a Radio-Telegraphers Battalion was formed in Tivoli. The battalion was assigned to the 3rd Engineer Regiment (Telegraphers) and received the 27 radio-telegraphers sections the regiment had formed during the war. The battalion also received a train section and an automobile squad. The battalion immediately began to train personnel for an additional 23 radio-telegraphers sections destined for the army's 23 army corps. However, the war ended before the training had been completed.

=== Interwar years ===
On 21 November 1919, the Radio-Telegraphers Engineer Regiment was formed in Rome. The new regiment united all radio-telegraphers units of the army and consisted of a command, five battalions, a depot in Rome, four branch depots in Mestre, Florence, Piacenza, and Palermo, and the Special Radio-Telegraphers Section for Sardinia, which was based in Cagliari. The regiment's five battalions were based in Rome, Mestre, Florence, Piacenza, and Palermo and consisted of two radio-telegraphers companies each. Over the next years the regiment added a sixth battalion and the regiment's battalions repeatedly changed location.

On 15 November 1926, the Radio-Telegraphers Engineer Regiment ceded its II Battalion, IV Battalion, and V Battalion to form the next day, on 16 November 1926, the 2nd Radio-Telegraphers Regiment in Florence. On the same day, the Radio-Telegraphers Engineer Regiment was renamed 1st Radio-Telegraphers Regiment. The 1st Radio-Telegraphers Regiment then formed two new battalions and consisted afterwards of a command in Rome, the I, II, and III battalions in Rome, the IV Battalion in Naples, the V Battalion in Palermo, the Radio-Telegraphers Company for Sardinia in Cagliari, a depot in Rome, and two branch depots in Naples and Palermo. Each of the five battalions consisted of two companies.

On 28 October 1932, both radio-telegraphers regiments were disbanded and the units of the 1st Radio-Telegraphers Regiment were distributed among the army's engineer regiments as follows:

- I Battalion assigned to the 7th Engineer Regiment, in Florence
- II Battalion assigned to the 6th Engineer Regiment, in Bologna
- III Battalion assigned to the 8th Engineer Regiment, in Rome
- IV Battalion assigned to the 10th Engineer Regiment, in Santa Maria Capua Vetere
- 9th Company/ V Battalion assigned to the 9th Engineer Regiment, in Trani
- 10th Company/ V Battalion assigned to the 12th Engineer Regiment, in Palermo
- Radio-Telegraphers Company for Sardinia assigned to the Mixed Engineer Battalion Sardinia

On the same day, 28 October 1932, the personnel of the command and depot of the 1st Radio-Telegraphers Regiment were used to form the command and depot of the newly formed 2nd Miners Regiment.

=== Cold War ===
On 1 December 1948, a Connections Battalion was formed in Milan as support unit of the III Territorial Military Command. In March 1950, the battalion was numbered III Connections Battalion and became the spiritual successor of the III Telegraphers Battalion and III Marconisti Battalion, which had been formed by the 6th Engineer Regiment during World War II. On 1 October 1952, the Connections Speciality became an autonomous speciality of the Engineer Arm, with its own school and gorget patches. On 16 May 1953, the speciality adopted the name Signal Speciality and consequently, on 1 June 1953, the III Connections Battalion was renamed III Signal Battalion. On 25 January 1954, the battalion was renamed III Army Corps Signal Battalion and consisted of a command, an operations company, a line construction company, and a signals center.

During the 1975 army reform the army disbanded the regimental level and newly independent battalions were granted for the first time their own flags. During the reform signal battalions were renamed for mountain passes. On 1 September 1975, the III Army Corps Signal Battalion was renamed 3rd Signal Battalion "Spluga". The battalion was named for the Splügen Pass (Italian: Passo Spluga), which connects the canton of Grisons in Switzerland with the Lombardy region in Italy. After the reform the 3rd Signal Battalion "Spluga" consisted of a command, a command and services platoon, three signal companies, and a repairs and recovery platoon.

On 12 November 1976, the President of the Italian Republic Giovanni Leone assigned with decree 846 the flag and traditions of the 1st Radio-Telegraphers Regiment to the battalion. In August 1977, the battalion formed a fourth signal company and fielded now 1,099 men (36 officers, 198 non-commissioned officers, and 859 soldiers).

In March 1989 the battalion was reorganized and consisted afterwards of a command, a command and services company, the 1st Signal Center Company, the 2nd Signal Center Company, and the 3rd Radio Relay Company. On 16 May 1991, the battalion received a second radio relay company from the 231st Signal Battalion "Sempione", which had been disbanded the day before.

=== Recent times ===
On 15 October 1995, the 3rd Signal Battalion "Spluga" lost its autonomy and the next day the battalion entered the reformed 1st Signal Regiment as Signal Battalion "Spluga". On the same day, the flag and traditions of the 1st Radio-Telegraphers Regiment were transferred from the battalion to the 1st Signal Regiment. The regiment consisted of a command, a command and services company, and the Signal Battalion "Spluga", which fielded two radio relay companies and two signal center companies. On 16 September 1996, the regiment was transferred from the 3rd Army Corps to the Support Units Command "Legnano". On 31 December 1997, the Support Units Command "Legnano" was disbanded and regiment was transferred to the Projection Forces Command.

On 1 June 1999, the Signal Speciality left the Italian Army's Engineer Arm and was elevated to Signal Arm. On 27 August 2001, the regiment reformed Signal Battalion "Sempione" as its second signal battalion. Since then the regiment is an expeditionary signal regiment capable to deploy and operate outside Italy. On 1 November 2001, the regiment was assigned to the Signal Brigade of the NATO Rapid Deployable Corps – Italy.

For its conduct and work during the COVID-19 pandemic the regiment was awarded in 2022 a Silver Cross of Army Merit, which was affixed to the regiment's flag.

== Organization ==
As of 2024 the 1st Signal Regiment is organized as follows:

- 1st Signal Regiment, in Milan
  - Command and Logistic Support Company
  - Signal Battalion "Spluga"
    - 1st Signal Company
    - 2nd Signal Company
    - 3rd Signal Company
  - Signal Battalion "Sempione"
    - 4th Signal Company
    - 5th Signal Company
    - 6th Signal Company
