= 7th CIMIC Regiment (Italy) =

Active Italian Army civil-military co-operation unit

- 7° Reggimento CIMIC
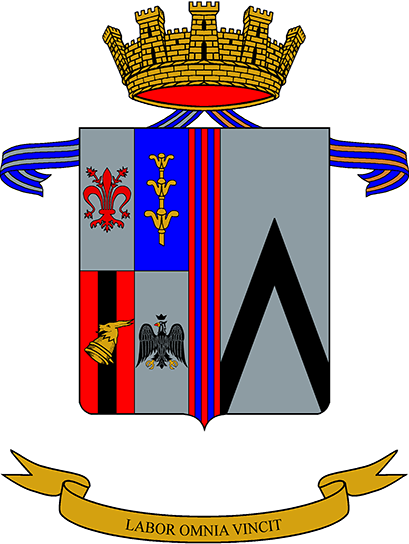
- Regimental coat of arms
- Active: 1 Dec. 1926 — 8 Sept. 1943; 1 Nov. 1975 — 31 Oct. 1986; 23 Jan. 2024 — today
- Country: Italy
- Branch: Italian Army
- Role: Civil-Military Co-operation
- Part of: Tactical Intelligence Brigade
- Garrison/HQ: Motta di Livenza
- Motto: "Labor omnia vincit"
- Anniversaries: 24 June 1918 - Second Battle of the Piave River
- Decorations: 1× Silver Medal of Army Valor; 1× Bronze Medal of Army Valor

Insignia
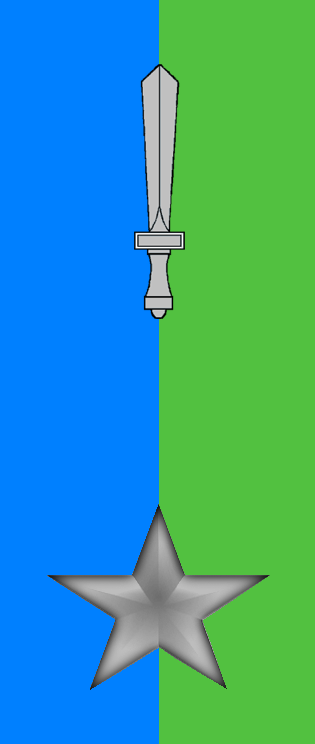
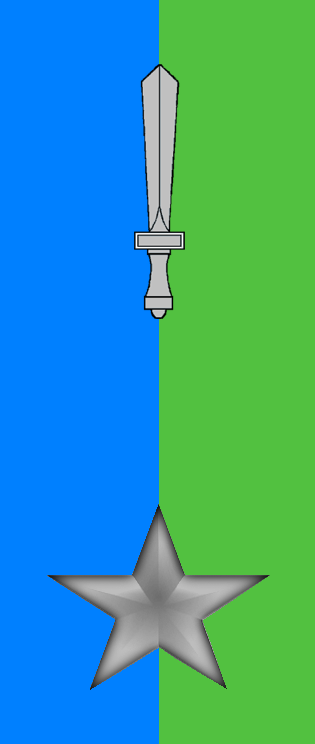
- CIMIC gorget patches

The 7th CIMIC Regiment (Italian: 7° Reggimento CIMIC) is a Civil-Military Co-operation regiment of the Italian Army based in Motta di Livenza in Veneto. The regiment is assigned to the Tactical Intelligence Brigade. In 1926, the Royal Italian Army formed the 7th Engineer Regiment in Florence. During the Second Italo-Ethiopian War and World War II the regiment's depot formed engineer battalions and smaller units, which deployed with divisions and corps to the fronts of the war. After the announcement of the Armistice of Cassibile on 8 September 1943 the regiment was disbanded by invading German forces. In 1944, the Italian Co-Belligerent Army formed the CIV Mixed Engineer Battalion for the Combat Group "Mantova", which fought on the allied side in the Italian campaign of World War II.

In 1946, the battalion split to form the Engineer Battalion "Mantova" and the Connections Battalion "Mantova", which were both assigned to the Infantry Division "Mantova". In 1975, the battalion was renamed 104th Engineer Battalion "Torre" and assigned the flag and traditions of the 7th Engineer Regiment. In 1986, the Mechanized Division "Mantova" and the 104th Engineer Battalion "Torre" were disbanded. On 23 January 2024, the flag and traditions of the 7th Engineer Regiment, which also carries the traditions of the CIV Mixed Engineer Battalion, Engineer Battalion "Mantova", and 104th Engineer Battalion "Torre", were assigned to the Multinational CIMIC Group, which, upon receiving the flag, was renamed 7th CIMIC Regiment. The regiment's anniversary falls, as for all engineer units, on 24 June 1918, the last day of the Second Battle of the Piave River.

== History ==
On 1 July 1918, the Royal Italian Army formed the 7th Engineer Regiment (Telegraphers). After the end of World War I the Royal Italian Army reorganized its forces and on 31 March 1920, the 7th Engineer Regiment (Telegraphers) was disbanded. In 1975, the traditions of the 7th Engineer Regiment (Telegraphers) were assigned to the 5th Signal Battalion "Rolle", which in 1992 entered the 7th Signal Regiment. Since then the traditions of the 7th Engineer Regiment (Telegraphers) are perpetuated by the 7th Signal Regiment.

=== Interwar years ===
On 1 October 1922, the Royal Italian Army formed the 6th Army Corps Engineer Grouping in Florence. The grouping received a Sappers Battalion and a Telegraphers Battalion, which had been formed on 1 April 1920 for the VIII Army Corps. On the same date, 1 October 1922, the VIII Army Corps was renumbered as VI Army Corps. The grouping also received a miners company from the disbanded Miners Engineer Regiment. After its formation the grouping consisted of a command, a sappers-miners battalion, a telegraphers battalion, which included four dovecotes located in Florence, La Spezia, Piacenza, and Nava, a photo-electricians company, and a depot.

In April 1923, one of the regiment's sappers-miners companies moved to Ozieri in Sardinia and established a detachment, which in May 1923 was transferred to the 7th Army Corps Engineer Grouping. In 1926, the VI Army Corps was renumbered as VII Army Corps and consequently, on 1 December 1926, the grouping was renamed 7th Engineer Regiment. During the same year the regiment formed a new dovecote in Portoferraio, while the dovecotes in Nava and in Piacenza were transferred to the 2nd Engineer Regiment respectively the 3rd Engineer Regiment. In February 1928, the regiment ceded some of its personnel to help form the depot of the newly formed 11th Engineer Regiment. On 28 October 1932, the regiment received the I Radio-Telegraphers Battalion of the disbanded 1st Radio-Telegraphers Regiment.

In March 1935, in preparation for the Second Italo-Ethiopian War, the regiment mobilized a divisional engineer command, the I Connections Battalion, I Mixed Battalion, IV Sappers Battalion, XXX Sappers Battalion, and various smaller units. At the end of 1936 the regiment consisted of a command, an engineer battalion, a telegraphers battalion, a radio-telegraphers battalion, five dovecotes, and a depot. In January 1937, the telegraphers and radio-telegraphers battalions were renamed connections battalions.

=== World War II ===
During World War II the regiment's depot in Florence mobilized the following units:

- II Marconisti Battalion
- XXXI Sappers Battalion
- XVIII Army Corps Engineer Battalion (for the XII Army Corps)
- XXXI Mixed Engineer Battalion (for the 131st Armored Division "Centauro")
- LXXX Mixed Engineer Battalion (for the 2nd Infantry Division "Sforzesca")
- CLI Mixed Engineer Battalion (for the 151st Infantry Division "Perugia")
- CCIV Mixed Engineer Battalion (for the 4th CC.NN. Division "3 Gennaio")
- 18th Mobile Dovecote
- and many smaller units

The XXXI Sappers Battalion, LXXX Mixed Engineer Battalion, and CCIV Mixed Engineer Battalion fought in the Western Desert campaign. The XXXI Mixed Engineer Battalion fought in the Tunisian campaign, while the XVIII Army Corps Engineer Battalion fought in the Sicilian campaign. In the evening of 8 September 1943, the Armistice of Cassibile, which ended hostilities between the Kingdom of Italy and the Anglo-American Allies, was announced by General Dwight D. Eisenhower on Radio Algiers and by Marshal Pietro Badoglio on Italian radio. Germany reacted by invading Italy and the 7th Engineer Regiment was disbanded soon thereafter by German forces.

On 1 October 1944, the Italian Co-Belligerent Army formed the CIV Mixed Engineer Battalion in Cosenza, which was assigned to the Combat Group "Mantova". The battalion consisted of a command, the 79th Engineer Company, and the 107th Teleradio Company. Both companies were transferred from the 104th Infantry Division "Mantova", which had remained loyal to King Victor Emmanuel III after the announcement of the Armistice of Cassibile. The Combat Group "Mantova" was equipped with British materiel and dressed in British uniforms. The combat group fought on the allied side in the Italian campaign. On 1 January 1945, the 4th Engineer Company joined the battalion.

=== Cold War ===
After the end of the war the CIV Mixed Engineer Battalion was based in Albissola and remained assigned to the Combat Group "Mantova". On 15 October 1945, the combat group was reorganized as Infantry Division "Mantova". On 6 September 1946, the battalion split to form the Engineer Battalion "Mantova" and the Connections Battalion "Mantova", which were both assigned to the Infantry Division "Mantova". After the split the battalion, which consisted of a command, the 4th Engineer Company, and the 79th Engineer Company, moved from Albissola to Borgo San Dalmazzo. In 1947, the battalion moved from Borgo San Dalmazzo to Udine, and by November 1947, the battalion consisted of a command, a command platoon, the 1st Engineer Company, the 2nd Engineer Company, and the Field Park Company. In 1950, the battalion formed the 3rd Engineer Company.

During the 1975 army reform the army disbanded the regimental level and newly independent battalions were granted for the first time their own flags. During the reform engineer battalions were named for a lake, if they supported an corps-level command, or a river, if they supported a division or brigade. On 1 November 1975, the Engineer Battalion "Mantova" was renamed 104th Engineer Battalion "Torre". The battalion was named for the Torre river, which flows near the battalion's base in Udine. After the reform the 104th Engineer Battalion "Torre" consisted of a command, a command and park company, and two engineer companies. At the time the battalion fielded 527 men (30 officers, 68 non-commissioned officers, and 429 soldiers).

On 12 November 1976, the President of the Italian Republic Giovanni Leone assigned with decree 846 the flag and traditions of the 7th Engineer Regiment to the battalion. The battalion also received the traditions of all engineer units, which had served with the "Mantova" division and Combat Group "Mantova".

For its conduct and work after the 1976 Friuli earthquake the battalion was awarded a Bronze Medal of Army Valor, which was affixed to the battalion's flag and added to the battalion's coat of arms. Due to the damage the battalion's base in Udine had suffered in the earthquake the battalion moved to Orzano di Remanzacco.

In 1986 the Italian Army disbanded the divisional level. Consequently, on 30 September 1986, the command of the Mechanized Division "Mantova" was disbanded, followed by the 104th Engineer Battalion "Torre" on 31 October 1986. The following 6 November, the flag of the 7th Engineer Regiment was transferred to the Shrine of the Flags in the Vittoriano in Rome for safekeeping.

== Recent times ==
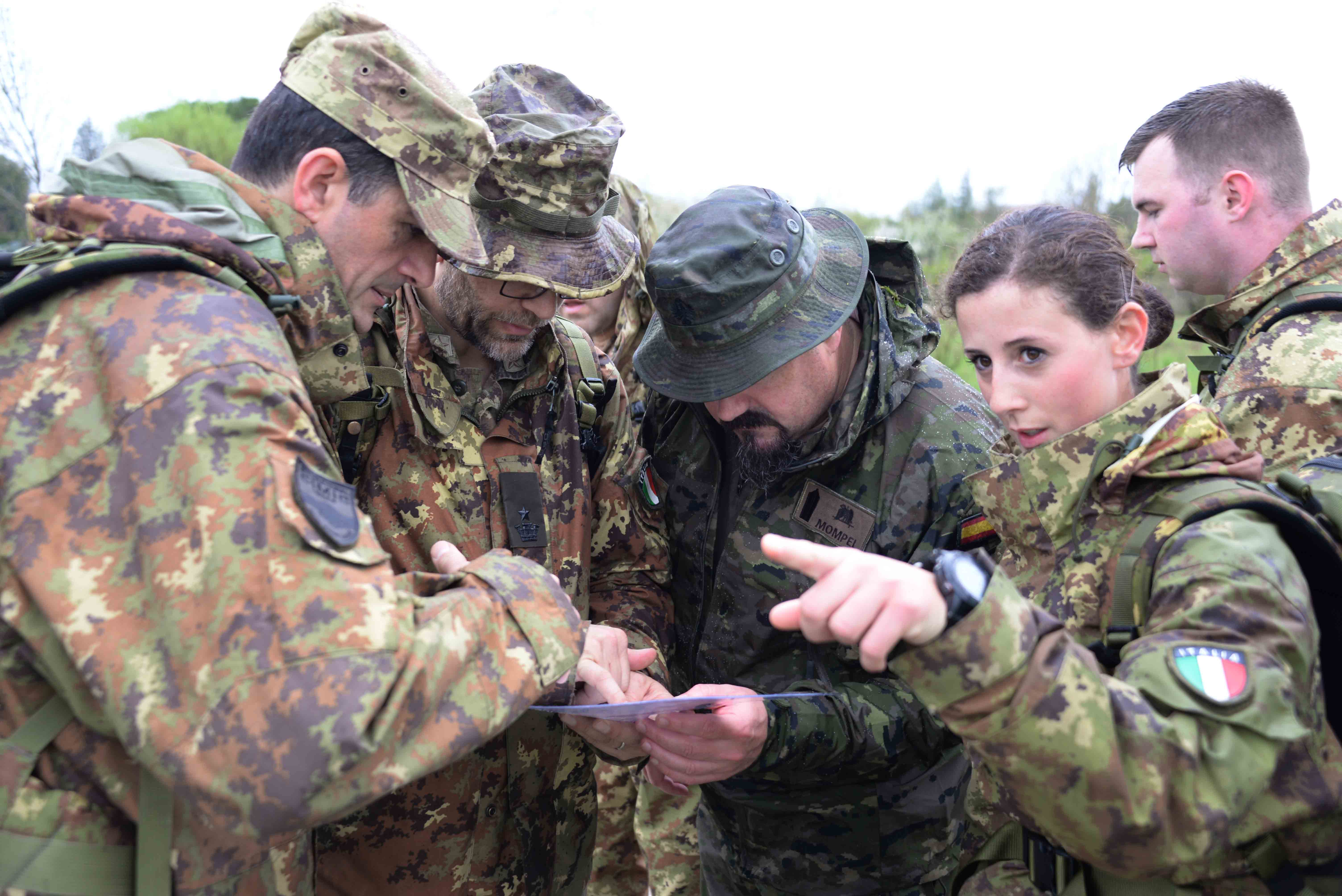
Multinational CIMIC Group personnel during a field exercise

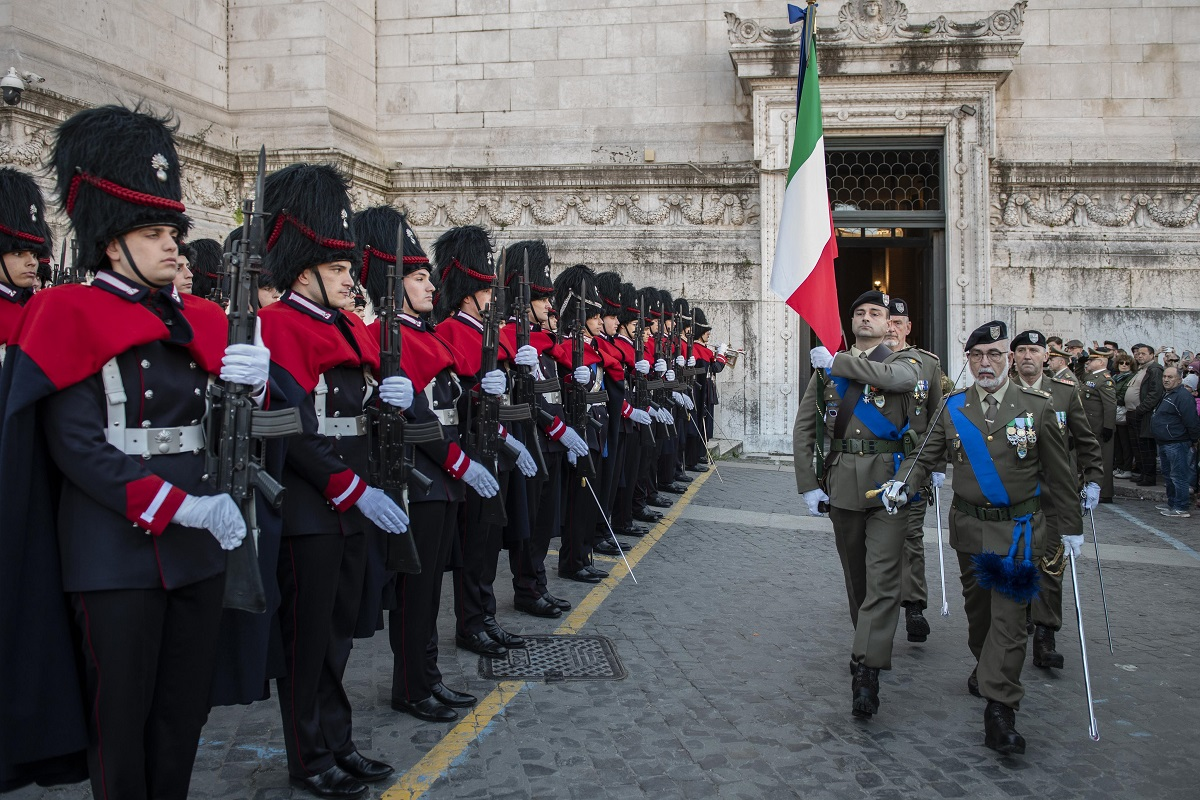
The flag of the 7th Engineer Regiment is retrieved from the Shrine of the Flags in the Vittoriano in Rome

In 1997, following the operations in the Balkans, NATO decided to create civil-military cooperation units. Consequently, on 1 January 2002, the Italian Army formed the CIMIC Group South in Motta di Livenza. Besides the Italian Armed Forces also the Hellenic Armed Forces, Hungarian Defence Forces, and Portuguese Armed Forces contributed personnel for the new unit. After becoming operational, the CIMIC Group South was assigned to NATO's Supreme Allied Commander Europe. In 2006, the Romanian Armed Forces became a contributing partner to the CIMIC Group South, which in 2009 was renamed "Multinational CIMIC Group". In 2014, the Slovenian Armed Forces became a contributing partner of the group.

On 23 January 2024, the flag and traditions of the 7th Engineer Regiment were assigned to the Multinational CIMIC Group, which upon receiving the flag was renamed 7th CIMIC Regiment. The regiment is assigned to the Tactical Intelligence Brigade and part of the NATO Response Force.

On 12 December 2025, the reformed regiment was awarded the Silver Medal of Army Valor for the many deployments of the preceding Multinational CIMIC Group in foreign operations between 2003 and 2025.

== Organization ==
As of 2024 the 7th CIMIC Regiment is organized as follows:

- 7th CIMIC Regiment, in Motta di Livenza
  - Headquarters Company (Operational tasks)
  - National Support Staff (Administrative tasks)
  - CIMIC Battalion
    - 1st CIMIC Company
    - 2nd CIMIC Company
    - 3rd CIMIC Company
    - 4th CIMIC Company
