= 107th Signal Battalion "Predil" =

Italian Army signal unit

- 107° Battaglione Trasmissioni "Predil"
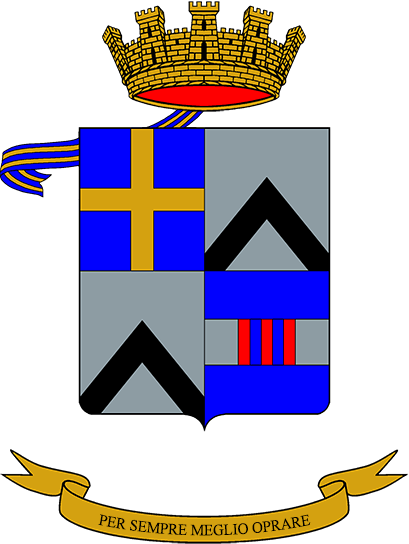
- Battalion coat of arms
- Active: 1 Nov. 1975 — 30 Nov. 1991
- Country: Italy
- Branch: Italian Army
- Role: Military signals
- Part of: 7th Signal Regiment
- Garrison/HQ: Sacile
- Motto(s): "Per sempre meglio oprare"
- Anniversaries: 20 June 1918 - Second Battle of the Piave River
- Decorations: 1× Bronze Medal of Army Valor

Insignia
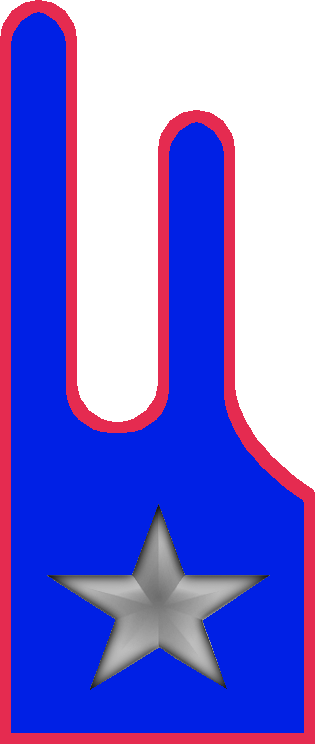
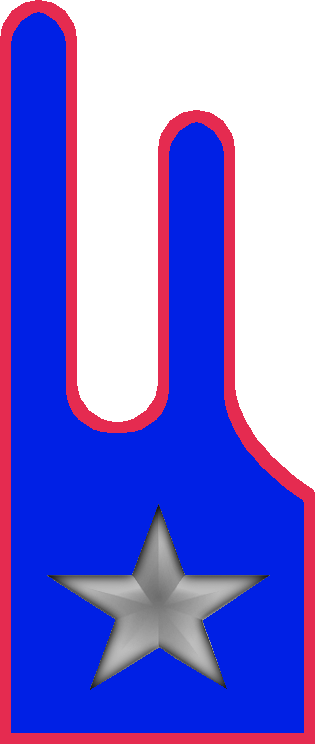
- Signallers gorget patches

The 107th Signal Battalion "Predil" (Italian: 107° Battaglione Trasmissioni "Predil") is a signals unit of the Italian Army. The battalion was formed in 1946 and assigned to the Infantry Division "Mantova". In 1975, the battalion was named for the Predil Pass and received the number 107th, which had been used by the 107th Teleradio Company that had served with the Combat Group "Mantova" during the Italian campaign of World War II. With the name and number the battalion also received its own flag. In 1991, the battalion was disbanded. In 2002, the battalion was reformed and assigned to the 7th Signal Regiment as the regiment's second signal battalion. The battalion's anniversary falls, as for all signal units, on 20 June 1918, the day the Austro-Hungarian Army began its retreat across the Piave river during the Second Battle of the Piave River.

== History ==
=== World War II ===
During World War II the 4th Engineer Regiment in Bolzano formed the 107th Mixed Telegraphers and Radio-Telegraphers Company for the 104th Infantry Division "Mantova". In the evening of 8 September 1943, the Armistice of Cassibile, which ended hostilities between the Kingdom of Italy and the Anglo-American Allies, was announced by General Dwight D. Eisenhower on Radio Algiers and by Marshal Pietro Badoglio on Italian radio. Germany reacted to the armistice by invading Italy, while the "Mantova" division remained loyal to King Victor Emmanuel III and assisted allied forces landing on the Italian peninsula.

On 1 October 1944, the 107th Mixed Telegraphers and Radio-Telegraphers Company was renamed 107th Teleradio Company and assigned to the CIV Mixed Engineer Battalion, which was formed in Cosenza for the Italian Co-Belligerent Army's Combat Group "Mantova". The battalion consisted of a command, the 79th Engineer Company, and the 107th Teleradio Company. The battalion fought with the Combat Group "Mantova" on the allied side in the Italian campaign.

=== Cold War ===
After the end of the war the CIV Mixed Engineer Battalion was based in Albissola and remained assigned to the Combat Group "Mantova". On 15 October 1945, the combat group was reorganized as Infantry Division "Mantova". On 6 September 1946, the battalion split to form the Connections Battalion "Mantova" and the Engineer Battalion "Mantova", which were both assigned to the Infantry Division "Mantova". The Connections Battalion "Mantova" consisted of a command, a command platoon, and three connections companies — one for the division's headquarters, one for the division's infantry regiments, and one for the division's artillery regiments. In 1947, the battalion moved from Albissola to Tricesimo and two years later, in 1949, from Tricesimo to Udine.

On 1 October 1952, the Connections Speciality became an autonomous speciality of the Engineer Arm, with its own school and gorget patches. On 16 May 1953, the speciality adopted the name Signal Speciality and consequently, on 1 June 1953, the Connections Battalion "Mantova" was renamed Signal Battalion "Mantova". On 1 April 1954, the battalion was reduced to a company consisting of a command, a command platoon, two Marconisti platoons, a signals center platoon, and a phone signals platoon. On 5 December 1958, the company was expanded to Signal Battalion "Mantova" and consisted afterwards of a command, a command platoon, the 1st Signal Company, and the 2nd Signal Company.

During the 1975 army reform the army disbanded the regimental level and newly independent battalions were granted for the first time their own flags. During the reform signal battalions were renamed for mountain passes. On 1 January 1976, the Signal Battalion "Mantova" was renamed 107th Signal Battalion "Predil". The battalion was named for the Predil Pass, which connects Tarvisio in Italy with Bovec in Slovenia. The battalion was assigned to the Mechanized Division "Folgore" and consisted after the reform of a command, a command and services platoon, two signal companies, and a repairs and recovery platoon. At the time the battalion fielded 572 men (19 officers, 99 non-commissioned officers, and 454 soldiers). On 12 November 1976, the President of the Italian Republic Giovanni Leone granted with decree 846 the battalion a flag.

For its conduct and work after the 1976 Friuli earthquake the battalion was awarded a Bronze Medal of Army Valor, which was affixed to the battalion's flag and added to the battalion's coat of arms.

In 1986, the Mechanized Division "Mantova was disbanded. Consequently, on 1 July 1986, the battalion was transferred to the 5th Army Corps' Signal Command. On 1 June 1989, the battalion was reorganized and now consisted of a command, a command and services company, the 1st Radio Relay Company, the 2nd Radio Relay Company, and the 3rd Signal Center Company.

With the end of the Cold War the Italian Army began to draw down its forces and, on 30 September 1991, the battalion was disbanded and the next day, the battalion's 3rd Signal Center Company joined to the 184th Signal Battalion "Cansiglio". On 5 December 1991, the flag of the 107th Signal Battalion "Predil" was transferred to the Shrine of the Flags in the Vittoriano in Rome for safekeeping.

=== Recent times ===
On 8 January 2002, the battalion was reformed as Signal Battalion "Predil" and assigned to the 7th Signal Regiment as the regiment's second signal battalion.
