= 231st Signal Battalion "Sempione" =

Italian Army signal unit

- 231° Battaglione Trasmissioni "Sempione"
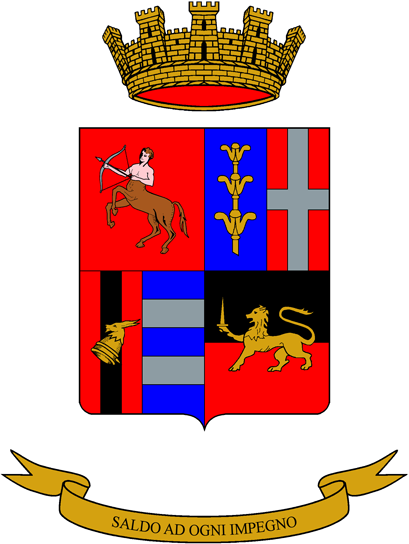
- Battalion coat of arms
- Active: 20 Oct. 1975 13 — 15 May 1991
- Country: Italy
- Branch: Italian Army
- Role: Military signals
- Part of: 1st Signal Regiment
- Garrison/HQ: Milan
- Motto(s): "Saldo ad ogni impegno"
- Anniversaries: 20 June 1918 - Second Battle of the Piave River
- Decorations: 1× Bronze Medal of Civil Merit

Insignia
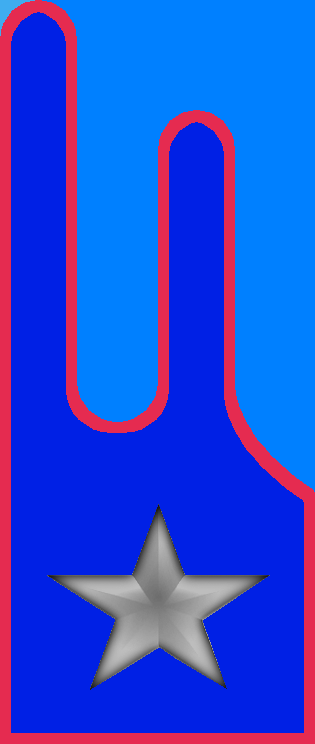
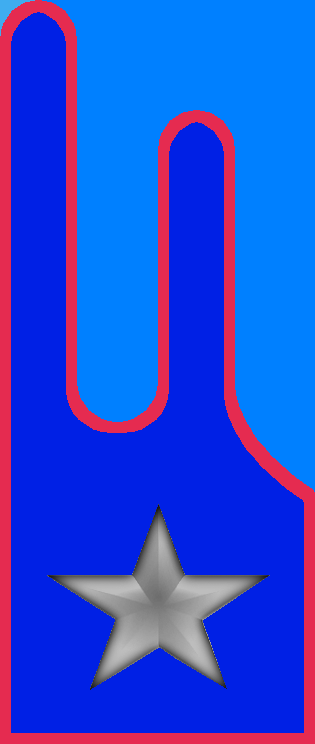
- Signallers gorget patches

The 231st Signal Battalion "Sempione" (Italian: 231° Battaglione Trasmissioni "Sempione") is signals unit of the Italian Army. The battalion was formed in 1959 and assigned to the Armored Division "Centauro". In 1975, the battalion was named for the Simplon Pass (Italian: Passo Sempione) and received the number 231st, which had been used by the 231st Connections Company that had served with the 131st Armored Division "Centauro" during the Tunisian campaign of World War II. With the name and number the battalion also received its own flag. In 1991, the battalion was disbanded. In 2001, the battalion was reformed and assigned to the 1st Signal Regiment as the regiment's second signal battalion. The battalion's anniversary falls, as for all signal units, on 20 June 1918, the day the Austro-Hungarian Army began its retreat across the Piave river during the Second Battle of the Piave River.

== History ==
On 5 June 1936, a Mixed Engineer Platoon was formed for the I Motor-mechanized Brigade. On 15 July 1937, the platon was expanded to Mixed Engineer Company and on the same date the brigade was renamed I Armored Brigade. On 20 April 1939, the brigade was renamed 131st Armored Division "Centauro", while the Mixed Engineer Company was renamed 131st Mixed Engineer Company. The personnel, which was assigned to the company, was trained by the 7th Engineer Regiment in Florence.

=== World War II ===
In 1940, the 131st Armored Division "Centauro" fought in the Greco-Italian War and in 1941 in the Invasion of Yugoslavia. In October 1942, the division was transferred to Libya to reinforce the Panzer Army Africa fighting in the Western Desert campaign. The division did not participate in the Second Battle of El Alamein and the division's first units reached the front in late 1942, during the Axis retreat from Egypt.

In early 1943, the 131st Mixed Engineer Company was split to form the 131st Engineer Company and the 231st Connections Company, which both entered the newly formed XXXI Mixed Engineer Battalion. In 1943, the "Centauro" division fought in the Tunisian campaign, during which the division was severely decimated in the Battle of El Guettar. On 7 April 1943, the division's remaining personnel was assigned to the 16th Infantry Division "Pistoia" and, on 18 April 1943, the "Centauro" division was declared lost due to wartime events.

=== Cold War ===
In 1951, the Italian Army formed the Armored Brigade "Centauro" in Verona. The brigade included a connections platoon that grew over the next years into a company. In 1955, the company moved with the brigade headquarter to the city of Novara. On 1 April 1959, the company was expanded to Signal Battalion "Centauro", which consisted of a command, a command platoon, the 1st Signal Company, and the 2nd Signal Company. On 1 November 1959, the brigade was expanded to Armored Division "Centauro".

In 1963, the Italian Army reorganized its armored divisions along NATO standards and added a brigade level to the divisions' organization. As part of the reorganization the Signal Battalion "Centauro" formed a signal company for each of the division's three brigades. On 30 September 1968, the three brigade headquarters were disbanded and the next day, on 1 October 1968, the brigades' signal companies entered the Signal Battalion "Centauro", which renumbered them as 4th Signal Company, 5th Signal Company, and 6th Signal Company. In November 1968, the battalion was deployed in the Province of Vercelli to help rescue efforts after heavy floods had devastated the area. For its work in Vercelli the battalion was awarded a Bronze Medal of Civil Merit.

During the 1975 army reform the army disbanded the regimental level and newly independent battalions were granted for the first time their own flags. As part of the reform the Italian Army's signal battalions were renamed for mountain passes. On 1 August 1975, the 4th Signal Company was transferred to the Signal Battalion "Granatieri di Sardegna" of the Infantry Division "Granatieri di Sardegna". On 20 October 1975, the Signal Battalion "Centauro" was renamed 231st Signal Battalion "Sempione". The battalion was named for the Simplon Pass (Italian: Passo Sempione), which connects the canton of Valais in Switzerland with the Piedmont region in Italy. The next day, on 21 October 1975, the Armored Division "Centauro" was reorganized and the 3rd Mechanized Brigade "Goito" and 31st Armored Brigade "Curtatone" were formed with the division's units. On the same day, the Signal Battalion "Sempione" transferred the 5th and 6th signals companies, which had been formed during the 1963 reform, to the command and signal units of the new brigades. After the reform the battalion consisted of a command, a command and services platoon, two signal companies, and a repairs and recovery platoon. At the time the battalion fielded 572 men (19 officers, 99 non-commissioned officers, and 454 soldiers). On 12 November 1976, the President of the Italian Republic Giovanni Leone granted with decree 846 the battalion a flag.

In 1986, the Armored Division "Centauro was disbanded. Consequently, on 1 August 1986, the battalion was transferred to the 3rd Army Corps' Signal Command. On 1 June 1989, the battalion was reorganized and consisted afterwards of a command, a command and services company, the 1st Radio Relay Company, the 2nd Radio Relay Company, and the 3rd Signal Center Company.

With the end of the Cold War the Italian Army began to draw down its forces and, on 15 May 1991, the 231st Signal Battalion "Sempione" was disbanded and the next day, the battalion's 1st Radio Relay Company joined the 3rd Signal Battalion "Spluga". On 29 June 1991, the battalion's flag was transferred to the Shrine of the Flags in the Vittoriano in Rome for safekeeping.

=== Recent times ===
On 27 August 2001, the battalion was reformed as Signal Battalion "Sempione" and assigned to the 1st Signal Regiment as the regiment's second signal battalion.
