= 3rd Signal Regiment (Italy) =

Active Italian Army signal unit

- 3° Reggimento Trasmissioni
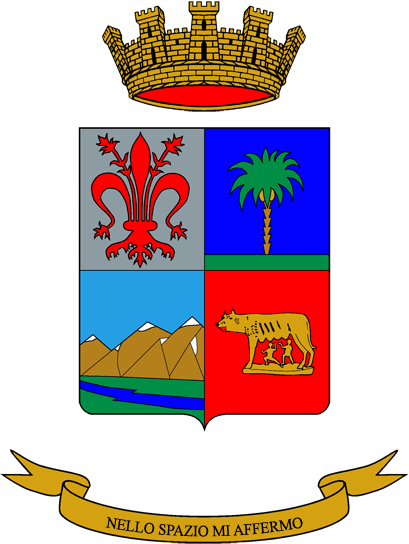
- Regimental coat of arms
- Active: 1 Nov. 1883 — 31 March 1920; 31 Dec. 1975 — today
- Country: Italy
- Branch: Italian Army
- Role: Military signals
- Part of: Signal Command
- Garrison/HQ: Rome
- Motto(s): "Nello spazio mi affermo"
- Anniversaries: 20 June 1918 - Second Battle of the Piave River
- Decorations: 1× Gold Cross of Army Merit

Insignia
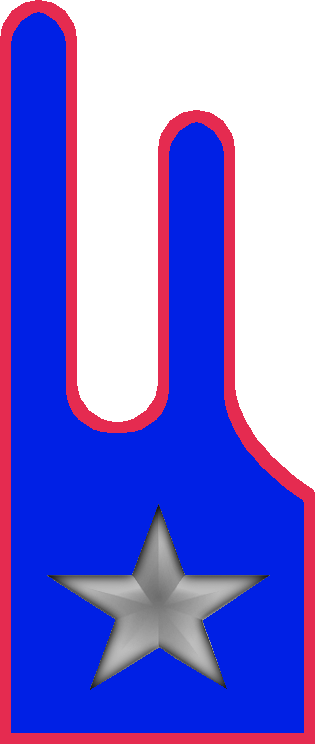
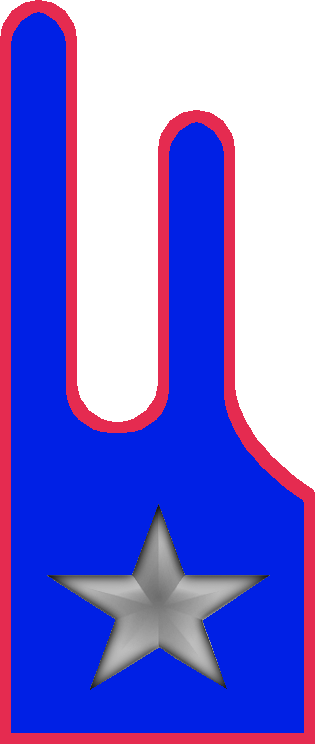
- Signallers gorget patches

The 3rd Signal Regiment (Italian: 3° Reggimento Trasmissioni) is a national support signals regiment of the Italian Army based in Rome in Lazio. The regiment is the army's oldest signal regiment and assigned to the army's Signal Command. The regiment's three battalions operate the army's telecommunications network in central Italy and Sardinia. The regiment was formed in 1883 as an engineer regiment, which, in 1895, became responsible for training the Royal Italian Army's telegraph personnel and for providing telegraph units to operational units. In 1912, the regiment added the training of wireless telegraphy personnel to its duties. During World War I the regiment formed a total of 127 companies, 59 of which were transferred in 1918 to the newly formed 7th Engineer Regiment (Telegraphers). In 1920, the regiment was disbanded and its companies formed into battalions, which were assigned to the Royal Italian Army's army corps.

In 1943, the Italian Co-belligerent Army formed a signal battalion for its general staff, which after the war was assigned to the Army General Staff in Rome. In 1957, the battalion given the number X, which had been used by three signal battalions during World War II. In 1975, the battalion was named for the Lanciano Pass and assigned the flag and traditions of the 3rd Engineer Regiment (Telegraphers). In 1993, battalion lost its autonomy and entered the reformed 3rd Signal Regiment, which continued to support the army's general staff. In 1998, the regiment was tasked with operating the army's telecommunications network in central Italy and the Tuscany and Emilia-Romagna regions and incorporated the Signal Battalion "Abetone" of the disbanded 43rd Signal Regiment and some minor units of the 44th Signal Regiment. In 2000, the regiment incorporated the Signal Battalion "Gennargentu", which operated the army's telecommunications network in Sardinia. The regiment's anniversary falls, as for all signal units, on 20 June 1918, the day the Austro-Hungarian Army began its retreat across the Piave river during the Second Battle of the Piave River.

== History ==
On 1 November 1883, the 3rd Engineer Regiment was formed in Florence with companies transferred from the 1st Engineer Regiment and 2nd Engineer Regiment. Each of the two regiments transferred three telegraphers companies, two sappers companies, two Ferrovieri companies, and one train company. On 1 November 1887, the regiment formed three new sapper companies and a Specialists Company. On the same date, the regiment transferred its four Ferrovieri companies to the 4th Engineer Regiment, which in turn transferred a train company to the 3rd Engineer Regiment. During the same year the regiment's 3rd Telegraphers Company was sent to Eritrea, where it fought in the Italo-Ethiopian War of 1887–1889.

In 1894, the Specialists Company and a sappers company were detached to Rome, where they formed the Specialists Brigade. On 1 November 1895, the regiment ceded a train company to help form the 5th Engineer Regiment (Miners). On the same date, the regiment was renamed 3rd Engineer Regiment (Telegraphers) and consisted of a staff, four sappers-telegraphers brigades, the Specialists Brigade, two train companies, and a depot. The four sappers-telegraphers brigades fielded a total of six telegraphers and six sapper companies, while the Specialists Brigade fielded the Specialists Company and a sappers company. In 1895, the regiment provided seven officers and 192 enlisted for units deployed to Eritrea for the First Italo-Ethiopian War.

In April 1896, the Specialists Brigade formed a Field Photography Section and a Radio-Telegraphers Section, which trained the Royal Italian Army's radio-telegraphic personnel in the use of spark-gap transmitters. On 22 December 1898, the regiment's sappers-telegraphers brigades were renamed telegraphers brigades. In September 1909, the Specialists Brigade became an autonomous unit, which in 1911 was renamed Specialists Battalion. The regiment's remaining brigades had already been renamed battalions in 1910. In July 1911, the regiment formed a fifth telegraphers battalion. The same year the regiment provided two telegraphers companies for the Italo-Turkish War. In August 1912, the task of training the army's radio-telegraphic service personnel was transferred to the 3rd Engineer Regiment (Telegraphers), while the Specialists Battalion continued to train the radio-telegraphic personnel of the army's Military Aviation Corps.

=== World War I ===
At the outbreak of World War I the regiment mobilized the following units for service on the Italian Front: 24 telegraphers companies, four telegraphers sections for cavalry divisions, nine radio-telegraphers sections, one train company, and five mobile militia companies that served as infantry. Until the war's end the regiment formed a total of 127 telegraphers companies, 59 of which were transferred on 1 July 1918 to the newly formed 7th Signal Regiment (Telegraphers). The Italian inventor Guglielmo Marconi served as officer in the regiment during the war.

On 31 March 1920, the 3rd Signal Regiment (Telegraphers) and 7th Signal Regiment (Telegraphers) were disbanded and the next day, on 1 April 1920, the two regiments' companies were used to form an Army Corps Telegraphers Battalion for each of the Royal Italian Army's army corps.

=== World War II ===
At the outbreak of World War II the depot of the 10th Engineer Regiment in Santa Maria Capua Vetere formed the X Connections Battalion, which served with the X Army Corps in the Western Desert campaign, while the depot of the 8th Engineer Regiment in Rome formed the X Telegraphers Battalion and X Marconisti Battalion, the latter of which moved to the Forte Trionfale in Rome as a support unit of the Royal Italian Army's General Staff. In the evening of 8 September 1943, the Armistice of Cassibile, which ended hostilities between the Kingdom of Italy and the Anglo-American Allies, was announced by General Dwight D. Eisenhower on Radio Algiers and by Marshal Pietro Badoglio on Italian radio. Germany reacted by invading Italy and the X Telegraphers Battalion and X Marconisti Battalion were disbanded soon thereafter by German forces.

In November 1943, the Italian Co-belligerent Army formed the Army General Staff Signal Battalion in Monteroni di Lecce, which moved to Rome after the city was liberated in June 1944. The battalion consisted of a telegraphers company, a marconisti company, and a network and operations office.

=== Cold War ===
On 11 January 1947, the Army General Staff Signal Battalion was renamed Ministry of War Special Connections Battalion. At the time the battalion consisted of a command, a teleradio company, a marconisti company, two special marconisti companies, and a network and operations office. On 1 October 1952, the Connections Speciality became an autonomous speciality of the Engineer Arm, with its own school and gorget patches. On 16 May 1953, the speciality adopted the name Signal Speciality and consequently, on 1 June 1953, the battalion was renamed Ministry of Defense-Army Special Signal Battalion. In 1957, the battalion was renamed X Signal Battalion and thus became the spiritual successor of the three World War II battalions with the same number.

During the 1975 army reform the army disbanded the regimental level and newly independent battalions were granted for the first time their own flags. During the reform signal battalions were renamed for mountain passes. On 31 December 1975, the X Signal Battalion was renamed 10th Signal Battalion "Lanciano". The battalion was named for the Lanciano Pass, which connects the provinces of Chieti and Pescara. After the reform, the 10th Signal Battalion "Lanciano" consisted of a command, a command and services platoon, and three signal companies. The battalion was assigned to the Army General Staff's Signal Inspectorate and had territorial functions, while operational tasks were assigned to the 11th Signal Battalion "Leonessa".

On 12 November 1976, the President of the Italian Republic Giovanni Leone assigned with decree 846 the flag and traditions of the 3rd Engineer Regiment (Telegraphers) to the battalion.

In 1984, the battalion's Command and Services Platoon was expanded to Command and Services Company, while one of the battalion's three signal companies was disbanded.

=== Recent times ===
On 24 September 1993, the 10th Signal Battalion "Lanciano" lost its autonomy and the next day the battalion entered the reformed 3rd Signal Regiment as Signal Battalion "Lanciano". On the same day, the flag and traditions of the 3rd Engineer Regiment (Telegraphers) were transferred from the battalion to the 3rd Signal Regiment.

In 1998, the regiment was tasked with the operation of the army's telecommunications network in central Italy and the Tuscany and Emilia-Romagna regions. Consequently, on 9 September 1998, the regiment received the Signal Battalion "Abetone" and 7th TLC Section in Florence, and the 6th TLC Section in Bologna from the disbanded 43rd Signal Regiment. On 1 October 1998, the regiment was assigned to the army's C4 IEW Command. On 1 December of the same year, the regiment received the 8th TLC Section in Rome and the 13th TLC Section in Pescara from the 44th Signal Regiment, which was reorganized on the same day as 44th TLC Support Regiment. In 2000, the regiment incorporated the Signal Battalion "Gennargentu", which operated the army's telecommunications network in Sardinia. On 1 June 1999, the Signal Speciality left the Italian Army's Engineer Arm and was elevated to Signal Arm.

Between 1995 and 2016, the regiment deployed to Kosovo, Lebanon, Afghanistan, Iraq, and Sudan. For its conduct and service in these missions, the regiment was awarded in 2017 a Gold Cross of Army Merit, which was affixed to the regiment's flag.

== Organization ==
As of 2024 the 3rd Signal Regiment operates the army's telecommunications network in the Abruzzo, Emilia-Romagna, Lazio, Marche, Tuscany, Sardinia, and Umbria regions and is organized as follows:

- 3rd Signal Regiment, in Rome
  - Command and Logistic Support Company, in Rome
  - Signal Battalion "Lanciano", in Rome
    - 1st Signal Company — Area Support
    - 2nd Signal Company — C4 Systems Center
    - 3rd Signal Company — C4 Systems Center
  - Signal Battalion "Abetone", in Florence
    - Command and Logistic Support Company
    - 4th Signal Company — Area Support
    - 5th Signal Company — C4 Systems Center
  - Signal Battalion "Gennargentu", in Cagliari
    - Command and Logistic Support Company
    - 6th Signal Company — C4 Systems Center
    - Area Support Signal Platoon
  - 8th C4 Maintenance Unit, in Rome
    - C4 Maintenance Detachment, in Pescara
  - 14th C4 Maintenance Unit, in Cagliari
  - 67th C4 Maintenance Unit, in Florence
    - C4 Maintenance Detachment, in Bologna
  - Computer Incident Response Team, in Rome

The Battalion "Lanciano" operates army's telecommunications network in Lazio, Abruzzo, Marche, Umbria, and Molise, while the Battalion "Abetone" operates the network in Tuscany and the Emilia-Romagna, and the Battalion "Gennargentu" the network in Sardinia.
