= 44th TLC Support Battalion "Penne" =

Active Italian Army signal unit

- 44° Battaglione Sostegno TLC "Penne"
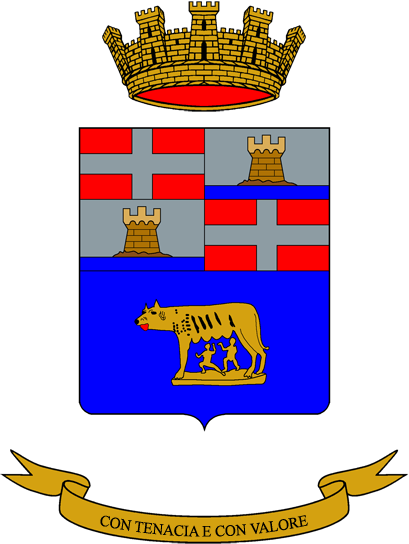
- Battalion coat of arms
- Active: 1 Jan. 1976 — today
- Country: Italy
- Branch: Italian Army
- Role: Military signals
- Part of: Army Logistic Command
- Garrison/HQ: Rome
- Motto(s): "Con tenacia e con valore"
- Anniversaries: 20 June 1918 - Second Battle of the Piave River

Insignia
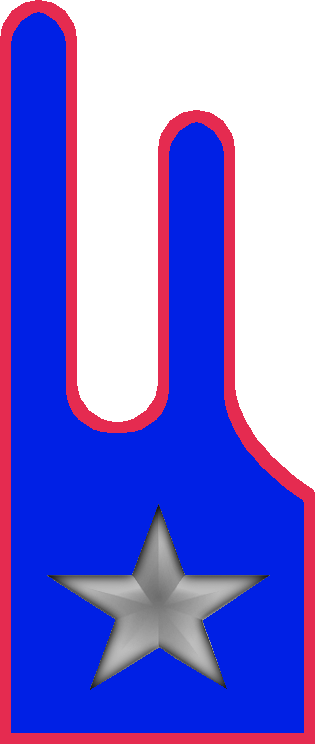
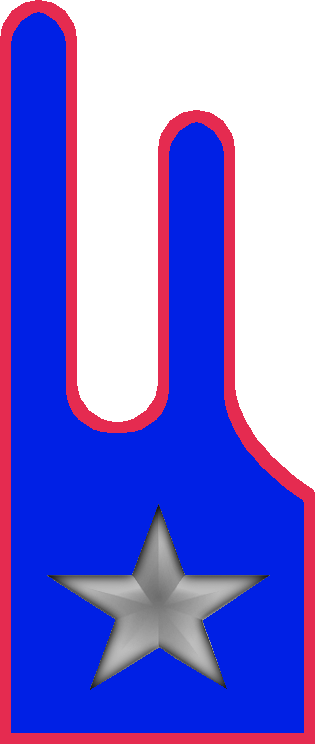
- Signallers gorget patches

The 44th TLC Support Battalion "Penne" (Italian: 44° Battaglione Sostegno TLC "Penne") is a telecommunications (TLC) support battalion of the Italian Army's signal corps. The battalion is based in Rome and assigned to the Army Logistic Command. The battalion was formed in 1957 and operated the army's telecommunications network in the Abruzzo, Lazio, Marche, and Umbria regions. In 1976, the battalion was named for the Forca di Penne Pass and received its own flag. In 1993, the battalion lost its autonomy and entered the newly formed 44th Signal Regiment, which in 1998 was reorganized as a telecommunications support regiment and the unit's task of operating the army's telecommunications network in central Italy was transferred to the 3rd Signal Regiment. Since then, the unit is responsible for building and maintaining the army's telecommunications network in central Italy, southern Italy, and on the islands of Sardinia and Sicily, and for providing third line maintenance for the network's materiel in the aforementioned regions. In 2017, the regiment was disbanded and the battalion became once more an autonomous unit. The battalion's anniversary falls, as for all signal units, on 20 June 1918, the day the Austro-Hungarian Army began its retreat across the Piave river during the Second Battle of the Piave River.

== History ==
=== Cold War ===
On 1 October 1957, the XLIV Signal Battalion was formed in Rome with the personnel and materiel of the 8th Territorial Signal Company and the Signal Company of the Territorial Military Command of Sardinia. The battalion was tasked with operating the army's communication network in central Italy and consisted of a command, a command and services platoon, and three signals companies. The battalion was assigned to the VIII Territorial Military Command in Rome and operated the army's telecommunications network in the Abruzzo, Lazio, Marche, and Umbria regions and on the island of Sardinia. On 31 March 1962, the battalion's 3rd Signal Company, which was based in Cagliari in Sardinia, left the battalion and became an autonomous unit. The next day the company was renamed Signal Company of the Sardinia Military Command and assigned to the Sardinia Military Command.

During the 1975 army reform the army disbanded the regimental level and newly independent battalions were granted for the first time their own flags. During the reform signal battalions were renamed for mountain passes. On 1 January 1976, the XLIV Signal Battalion was renamed to 44th Signal Battalion "Penne". The battalion was named for the Forca di Penne Pass, which connects the provinces of L'Aquila and Pescara. After the reform the battalion consisted of a command, a command and services platoon, and two signal companies. The battalion was assigned to the Central Military Region's Signal Command and operated the army's telecommunications network in the Abruzzo, Lazio, Marche (minus the provinces of Ancona and Pesaro), and Umbria regions. On 12 November 1976, the President of the Italian Republic Giovanni Leone granted with decree 846 the battalion a flag.

On 1 January 1988, the battalion was reorganized and consisted afterwards of a command, command and services company, the 1st TLC Infrastructure Managing Company, 2nd TLC Infrastructure Managing Company, which was detached to Pescara, and the 3rd Field Support Company.

=== Recent times ===
On 19 November 1993, the 44th Signal Battalion "Penne" lost its autonomy and the next day the battalion entered the newly formed 44th Signal Regiment as Signal Battalion "Penne". On the same day, the flag of the 44th Signal Battalion "Penne" was transferred from the battalion to the 44th Signal Regiment.

On 1 December 1998, the regiment was renamed 44th TLC Support Regiment and tasked with building and maintaining the army's telecommunications network in central Italy, southern Italy, and on the islands of Sardinia and Sicily. On 1 June 1999, the Signal Speciality left the Italian Army's Engineer Arm and was elevated to Signal Arm. On 1 January 2017, the 44th TLC Support Regiment was disbanded and the Signal Battalion "Penne" became once more an autonomous unit. On the same day, the regiment's flag passed to the battalion, which was renamed 44th TLC Support Battalion "Penne".

== Organization ==
As of 2024 the 44th TLC Support Battalion "Penne" is organized as follows:

- 44th TLC Support Battalion "Penne", in Rome
  - Command and Logistic Support Company
  - Maintenance Company
  - Supply Company
