= 184th TLC Support Battalion "Cansiglio" =

Active Italian Army signal unit

- 184° Battaglione Sostegno TLC "Cansiglio"
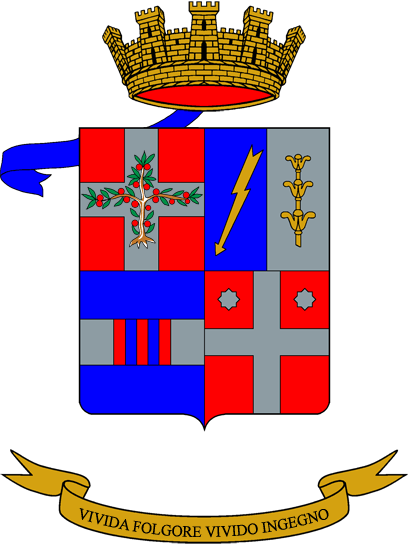
- Battalion coat of arms
- Active: 1 Jan. 1976 — 30 Nov. 1993; 1 Jan. 1999 — today
- Country: Italy
- Branch: Italian Army
- Role: Military signals
- Part of: Army Logistic Command
- Garrison/HQ: Treviso
- Motto: "Vivida folgore vivido ingegno"
- Anniversaries: 20 June 1918 - Second Battle of the Piave River
- Decorations: 1× Bronze Medal of Military Valor

Insignia
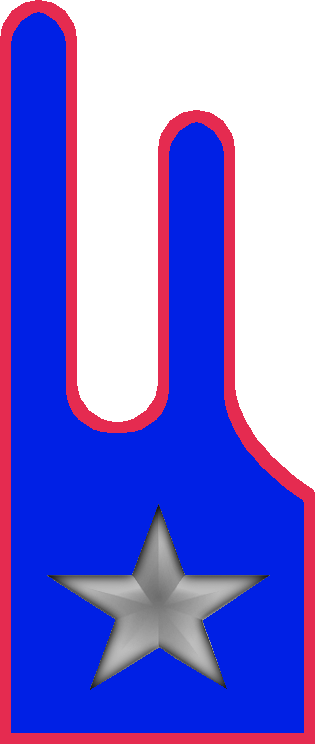
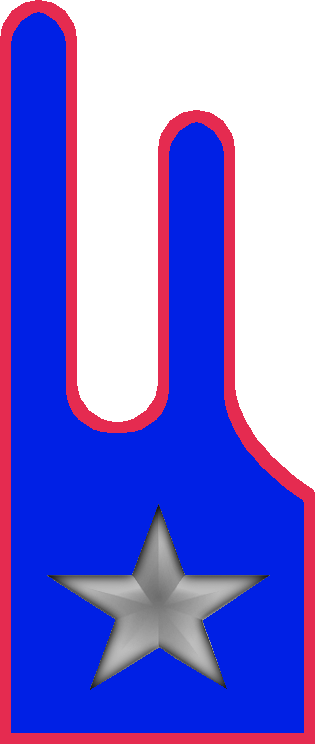
- Signallers gorget patches

The 184th TLC Support Battalion "Cansiglio" (Italian: 184° Battaglione Sostegno TLC "Cansiglio") is a telecommunications (TLC) support battalion of the Italian Army's signal corps. The battalion is based in Treviso in Veneto and assigned to the Army Logistic Command. The unit was formed in 1947 as a battalion and assigned to the Infantry Division "Folgore". In 1976, the battalion was named for the Cansiglio Pass and received the number 184th, which had been used by the 184th Connections Company that had served with the 184th Infantry Division "Nembo" and the Combat Group "Folgore" during the Italian campaign of World War II. With the name and number the battalion also received its own flag. In 1993, the battalion was disbanded and its personnel used to form the Signals Materiel Repair, Supply and Experimentation Telematic Center. In 1999, the center was renamed 184th TLC Support Regiment, which received the flag and traditions of the battalion. Since then, the unit is responsible for building and maintaining the army's telecommunications network in northern Italy and Tuscany, and for providing third line maintenance for the network's materiel in the aforementioned regions. In 2017, the regiment was disbanded and the battalion became once more an autonomous unit. The battalion's anniversary falls, as for all signal units, on 20 June 1918, the day the Austro-Hungarian Army began its retreat across the Piave river during the Second Battle of the Piave River.

== History ==
=== World War II ===
In 1937, the Royal Air Force Paratroopers School in Tarquinia formed a Connections Company. In June 1942, the company was renamed 185th Connections Company and assigned to the 185th Infantry Division "Folgore". The next month the division was transferred to Libya as reinforcement for Axis forces fighting in the Western Desert campaign. In November 1942, the "Folgore" division and its units were destroyed during the Second Battle of El Alamein.

In 1943, the 184th Connections Company and 184th Engineer Company were formed and assigned to the 184th Infantry Division "Nembo". In early June 1943, the "Nembo" division was transferred to Sardinia. In the evening of 8 September 1943, the Armistice of Cassibile, which ended hostilities between the Kingdom of Italy and the Anglo-American Allies, was announced by General Dwight D. Eisenhower on Radio Algiers and by Marshal Pietro Badoglio on Italian radio. Germany reacted by invading Italy, while the "Nembo" division remained loyal to King Victor Emmanuel III. In 1944, the division moved from Sardinia to Southern Italy to join the Italian Co-belligerent Army's Liberation Corps, which fought in the Italian campaign on the allied side. On 24 September 1944, the Liberation Corps was disbanded and its units and personnel used to form the combat groups "Folgore" and "Legnano". On the same day, the CLXXXIV Mixed Engineer Battalion was formed in Faicchio and assigned to the Combat Group "Folgore". The battalion consisted of the 184th Engineer Company, the 184th Connections Company, and the 10th Engineer Company, which was transferred from the 30th Infantry Division "Sabauda". Before the battalion was activated the personnel of the 129th Connections Company of the territorial Apulia-Lucania Command was incorporated into the 184th Connections Company. The Combat Group "Folgore" was equipped with British materiel and dressed in British uniforms. The combat group was assigned to the British XIII Corps and entered the front along the Gothic Line. In spring 1945, the battalion distinguished itself in combat along the Santerno river. For its conduct during the Italian campaign the battalion was awarded a Bronze Medal of Military Valor.

=== Cold War ===
On 15 October 1945, the Combat Group "Folgore" was renamed Infantry Division "Folgore". On 1 January 1947, the division was reorganized and the CLXXXIV Mixed Engineer Battalion split to form the Connections Battalion "Folgore" in Florence and the Engineer Battalion "Folgore" in Vittorio Veneto, which were both assigned to the Infantry Division "Folgore". The Connections Battalion "Folgore" consisted of a command, a command platoon, and three connections companies — one for the division's headquarters, one for the division's infantry regiments, and one for the division's artillery regiments. During the same year, the battalion moved from Florence to Conegliano in Veneto.

In 1951, the Connections Battalion "Folgore" moved from Conegliano to Treviso. On 1 October 1952, the Connections Speciality became an autonomous speciality of the Engineer Arm, with its own school and gorget patches. On 16 May 1953, the speciality adopted the name Signal Speciality and consequently, on 1 June 1953, the Connections Battalion "Folgore" was renamed Signal Battalion "Folgore". On 1 April 1954, the battalion was reduced to a company consisting of a command, a command platoon, two Marconisti platoons, a signals center platoon, and a phone signals platoon. On 1 November 1958, the company was expanded to battalion and now consisted of a command, a command platoon, the 1st Signal Company, and the 2nd Signal Company.

During the 1975 army reform the army disbanded the regimental level and newly independent battalions were granted for the first time their own flags. During the reform signal battalions were renamed for mountain passes. On 1 January 1976, the Signal Battalion "Folgore" was renamed 184th Signal Battalion "Cansiglio". The battalion was assigned to the Mechanized Division "Folgore" and consisted after the reform of a command, a command and services platoon, two signal companies, and a repairs and recovery platoon. At the time the battalion fielded 572 men (19 officers, 99 non-commissioned officers, and 454 soldiers). On 12 November 1976, the President of the Italian Republic Giovanni Leone granted with decree 846 the battalion a flag.

In 1986, the Mechanized Division "Folgore" was disbanded. Consequently, on 1 August 1986, the battalion was transferred to the 5th Army Corps' Signal Command. On 1 June 1989, the battalion was reorganized and consisted afterwards of a command, a command and services company, the 1st Radio Relay Company, the 2nd Radio Relay Company, and the 3rd Signal Center Company. On 1 October 1991, the battalion received a second signal center company from the 107th Signal Battalion "Predil", which had been disbanded the day before.

=== Recent times ===
On 30 November 1993, the battalion was disbanded and part of its personnel formed the Signals Materiel Repair, Supply and Experimentation Telematic Center in Treviso. On 4 March 1995, the flag of the 184th Signal Battalion "Cansiglio" was transferred to the Shrine of the Flags in the Vittoriano in Rome for safekeeping.

On 1 January 1999, the center was reorganized as 184th TLC Support Regiment. Shortly thereafter, the regiment retrieved the flag of the 184th Signal Battalion "Cansiglio" from the Shrine of the Flags in the Vittoriano. On 1 June 1999, the Signal Speciality left the Italian Army's Engineer Arm and was elevated to Signal Arm. On 1 January 2000, the regiment's C2 Development and Interoperability Department was renamed C4 Systems Development and Integration Department and transferred to the army's C4-IEW Command. On 1 January 2017, the 184th TLC Support Regiment was disbanded and the Signal Battalion "Cansiglio" became once more an autonomous unit. On the same day, the regiment's flag passed to the battalion, which was renamed 184th TLC Support Battalion "Cansiglio".

== Organization ==
As of 2024 the 184th TLC Support Battalion "Cansiglio" is organized as follows:

- 184th TLC Support Battalion "Cansiglio", in Treviso
  - Command and Logistic Support Company
  - Maintenance Company
  - Supply Company
