= 8th Paratroopers Engineer Regiment "Folgore" =

Active Italian Army airborne combat engineer unit

- 8° Reggimento Genio Guastatori Paracadutisti "Folgore"
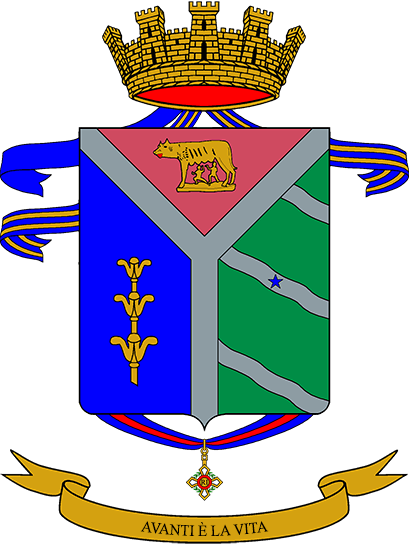
- Regimental coat of arms
- Active: 1 Oct. 1922 — 8 Sep. 1943; 1 Nov. 1975 — 30 Nov. 1995; 13 Oct. 2004 — today
- Country: Italy
- Branch: Italian Army
- Role: Combat engineers
- Part of: Paratroopers Brigade "Folgore"
- Garrison/HQ: Legnago
- Motto: "Avanti è la vita"
- Anniversaries: 24 June 1918 - Second Battle of the Piave River
- Decorations: 1× Military Order of Italy; 1× Bronze Medal of Military Valor; 1× Silver Medal of Army Valor; 1× Bronze Medal of Army Valor; 1× Silver Cross of Army Merit

Insignia
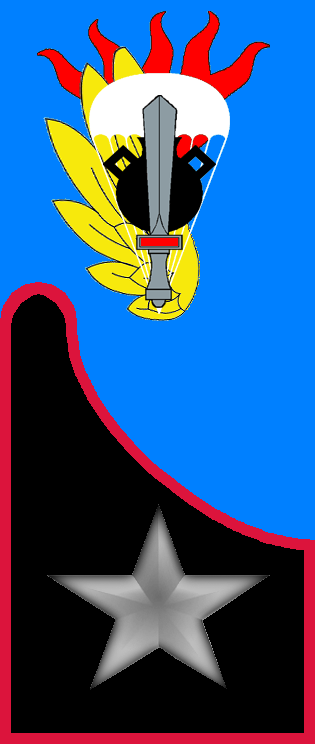
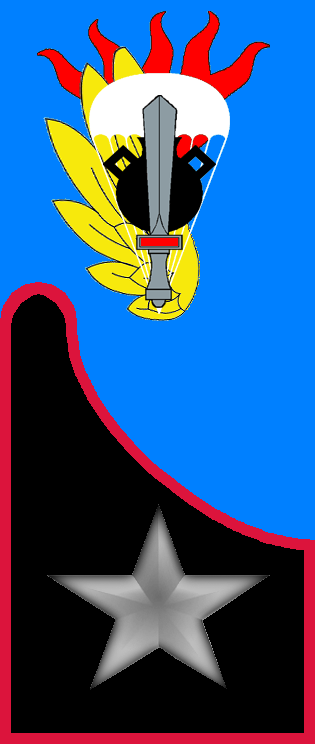
- Identification symbol

The 8th Paratroopers Engineer Regiment "Folgore" (Italian: 8° Reggimento Genio Guastatori Paracadutisti "Folgore") is an airborne military engineering regiment of the Italian Army based in Legnago in Veneto. The regiment is assigned to the Paratroopers Brigade "Folgore" and combines the lineage and traditions of the Royal Italian Army's 8th Engineer Regiment and VIII Paratroopers Sappers Battalion, and the Italian Co-Belligerent Army's CLXXXIV Mixed Engineer Battalion.

In 1926, the Royal Italian Army formed the 8th Engineer Regiment in Rome. During the Second Italo-Ethiopian War and World War II the regiment's depot formed engineer battalions and smaller units, which deployed with divisions and corps to the fronts of the war. After the announcement of the Armistice of Cassibile on 8 September 1943 the regiment was disbanded by invading German forces. In May 1942, the VIII Paratroopers Battalion of the 3rd Paratroopers Regiment was sent to the Sappers School in Civitavecchia to train as sappers. After the training the battalion was renamed VIII Paratroopers Sappers Battalion. The battalion was attached to the 185th Infantry Division "Folgore", with which the battalion deployed to Libya for the Western Desert campaign. In November 1942, the "Folgore" division and the VIII Paratroopers Sappers Battalion were destroyed during the Second Battle of El Alamein. In September 1944, the Italian Co-Belligerent Army formed the CLXXXIV Mixed Engineer Battalion for the Combat Group "Folgore". The battalion fought on the allied side in the Italian campaign. In spring 1945, the battalion distinguished itself in combat against German forces on the Santerno river.

In 1947, the CLXXXIV Mixed Engineer Battalion split to form the Connections Battalion "Folgore" and the Engineer Battalion "Folgore". In November 1975, the Engineer Battalion "Folgore" was renamed 184th Engineer Battalion "Santerno" and assigned the flag and traditions of the 8th Engineer Regiment. In September 1992, the battalion lost its autonomy and entered the reformed 8th Sappers Regiment. In 1995, the regiment was disbanded. In June 2001, the 5th Paratroopers Engineer Battalion "Bolsena" was renamed 8th Paratroopers Sappers Battalion. In October 2004, the battalion lost its autonomy and entered the reformed 8th Paratroopers Engineer Regiment "Folgore". The regiment's anniversary falls, as for all engineer units, on 24 June 1918, the last day of the Second Battle of the Piave River. However, as the regiment also inherited the traditions of the VIII Paratroopers Sappers Battalion, the regiment also celebrates the anniversary of the paratroopers speciality, which falls on 23 October 1942, the first day of the Second Battle of El Alamein.

== History ==
On 28 August 1918, the Royal Italian Army formed the 8th Engineer Regiment (Lagunari). After the end of World War I the Royal Italian Army reorganized its forces and on 21 November 1919, the 8th Engineer Regiment (Lagunari) was disbanded. The regiment's only remaining battalion, as well as the traditions of the 8th Engineer Regiment (Lagunari), were transferred to the 4th Engineer Regiment (Pontieri).

=== Interwar years ===
On 1 October 1922, the Royal Italian Army formed the 7th Army Corps Engineer Grouping in Rome. The grouping received a Sappers Battalion and a Telegraphers Battalion, which had been formed on 1 April 1920 for the IX Army Corps. On the same date, 1 October 1922, the IX Army Corps was renumbered as VII Army Corps. The grouping also received a miners company from the disbanded Miners Engineer Regiment. After its formation the grouping consisted of a command, a sappers-miners battalion, a telegraphers battalion, which included five dovecotes located in Rome, Perugia, Cagliari, Ozieri, and La Maddalena, a photo-electricians company, and a depot. In May 1923, the grouping incorporated a detachment in Ozieri in Sardinia, which had been formed by the 6th Army Corps Engineer Grouping a month earlier. In July of the same year, the detachment was renamed Mixed Detachment Sardinia. The detachment consisted of a sappers-miners company, a telegraphers company, a branch depot, and three dovecotes in Cagliari, Ozieri, and La Maddalena, which had been transferred from the 7th Army Corps Engineer Grouping.

In 1926, the VII Army Corps was renumbered as VIII Army Corps and consequently, on 20 October 1926, the grouping was renamed 8th Engineer Regiment. On 25 October of the same year, the Mixed Detachment Sardinia became an autonomous unit and was renamed Mixed Engineer Battalion Sardinia. During the same year the dovecote in Perugia was disbanded. On 28 October 1932, the regiment received the III Radio-Telegraphers Battalion of the disbanded 1st Radio-Telegraphers Regiment. On 5 May 1933, the regiment received an Aerostat Company and a Photographers Company. The two companies then entered the newly formed Aerostat and Photographers Battalion, which on 1 January 1935, was renamed Special Battalion. On the same date the Aerostat Company was reorganized and renamed Experimental Aerostatic Section.

In 1935, in preparation for the Second Italo-Ethiopian War the regiment formed the following units:

- XV Radio-Telegraphers Battalion
- XV Telegraphers Battalion
- I Connections Battalion
- and various photographic, telephotographic, cinematographic, and photo-electricians companies and sections

In 1936, the regiment formed the following units for service in the war in Ethiopia:

- II Connections Battalion
- III Connections Battalion
- XVI Telegraphers Battalion
- XXXV Sappers Battalion
- XXXVI Sappers Battalion
- three marching battalions, whose personnel was intended to replace troops already deployed beyond their service time in East Africa
- and various minor units

At the end of 1936, the regiment consisted of a command, an engineer battalion, a radio-telegraphers battalion, the Special Battalion, two dovecotes, and a depot. In January 1937, the telegraphers and radio-telegraphers battalions were renamed connections battalions. All throughout the year 1937, the regiment trained additional personnel as replacements for troops stationed in Ethiopia.

=== World War II ===
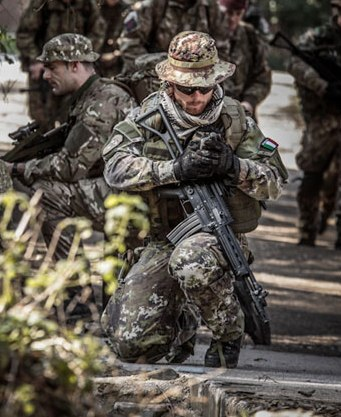
Folgore Combat Reconnaissance Team during an exercise

During World War II the 8th Engineer Regiment's depot in Rome mobilized the following units:

- Command of the 8th Engineer Grouping
- Command of the 10th Engineer Grouping
- Command of the 30th Special Grouping
- II Engineer Battalion
- X Marconisti Battalion (for the Army General Staff)
- X Telegraphers Battalion
- XL Special Battalion
- CCIII Mixed Engineer Battalion (for the 3rd CC.NN. Division "21 Aprile")
- a number of water battalions
- 20th and 21st mobile dovecotes
- and many smaller units

The 8th and 10th engineer groupings were tasked with construction work related to coastal defense and air defense in Italy. On 15 May 1943, the 30th Special Grouping was formed. The grouping assumed command of two connections battalions in Rome. On 16 July 1943, the grouping was renamed 30th Special Telecommunications Grouping. In the evening of 8 September 1943, the Armistice of Cassibile, which ended hostilities between the Kingdom of Italy and the Anglo-American Allies, was announced by General Dwight D. Eisenhower on Radio Algiers and by Marshal Pietro Badoglio on Italian radio. Germany reacted by invading Italy and the 8th Engineer Regiment and the three groupings it had formed were disbanded soon thereafter by German forces.

==== VIII Paratroopers Sappers Battalion ====
During World War II the Royal Italian Army's Sappers School in Civitavecchia formed nine sappers companies, which were equipped and trained to assault fortified positions. Each company fielded four assault platoons of 41 men per platoon. Each assault platoon consisted of two sapper teams, which were equipped with Model 38 submachine guns, hand grenades, and bangalore torpedoes, and two support teams, which were equipped with heavy machine guns and light mortars.

In the first months of 1942, the Air Force Paratroopers School in Tarquinia formed the VIII Paratroopers Battalion, which was assigned to the 3rd Paratroopers Regiment and consisted a command company, and the 22nd, 23rd, and 24th paratroopers companies. For the planned air assault on Malta the Paratroopers Division required a sappers unit and the army decided it would be more expedient to train paratroopers as sappers, rather than sappers as paratroopers. Consequently, in May 1942, the VIII Paratroopers Battalion arrived at the Sappers School in Civitavecchia for sapper training. After the conclusion of the training the battalion was sent to Bagnoli, where it attended an assault engineering course held by German combat engineers.

Once training was completed the VIII Paratroopers Sappers Battalion returned to the Paratroopers Division, which in summer 1942 was sent to Libya to fight in the Western Desert campaign. The battalion's 23rd Paratroopers Sappers Company remained in Italy to train the paratroopers sappers destined for the 184th Infantry Division "Nembo". On 27 July 1942, the Paratroopers Division was renamed 185th Infantry Division "Folgore". The "Folgore" division and its units were destroyed during the Second Battle of El Alamein. On 25 November 1942, the "Folgore" division was declared lost due to wartime events.

==== CLXXXIV Mixed Engineer Battalion ====
On 24 September 1944, the Italian Co-Belligerent Army formed the CLXXXIV Mixed Engineer Battalion in Faicchio. The battalion was assigned to the Combat Group "Folgore" and consisted of the 10th Engineer Company, which was transferred from the 30th Infantry Division "Sabauda", the 184th Engineer Company and 184th Connections Company. The latter two companies were transferred from the 184th Infantry Division "Nembo", which had been fighting on the allied side in the Italian campaign since May 1942. Before the battalion was activated the personnel of the 129th Connections Company of the territorial Apulia-Lucania Command was incorporated into the 184th Connections Company. The Combat Group "Folgore" was equipped with British materiel and dressed in British uniforms. The combat group was assigned to the British XIII Corps and entered the front along the Gothic Line. In March 1945, the battalion also received the 2nd Field Park Company.

In spring 1945, the battalion distinguished itself in combat along the Santerno river. For its conduct during the Italian campaign the battalion was awarded a Bronze Medal of Military Valor.

=== Cold War ===
On 15 October 1945, the Combat Group "Folgore" was renamed Infantry Division "Folgore". On 1 January 1947, the division was reorganized and the CLXXXIV Mixed Engineer Battalion split to form the Engineer Battalion "Folgore" in Vittorio Veneto and the Connections Battalion "Folgore" in Florence, which were both assigned to the Infantry Division "Folgore". In 1953, the Engineer Battalion "Folgore" moved from Vittorio Veneto to Villa Vicentina.

During the 1975 army reform the army disbanded the regimental level and newly independent battalions were granted for the first time their own flags. During the reform engineer battalions were named for a lake, if they supported an corps-level command, or a river, if they supported a division or brigade. On 1 November 1975, the Engineer Battalion "Folgore" was renamed 184th Engineer Battalion "Santerno". The battalion was named for the Santerno river, along which the CLXXXIV Mixed Engineer Battalion had distinguished itself in combat against Wehrmacht forces in spring 1945. After the reform the 184th Engineer Battalion "Santerno" consisted of a command, a command and park company, and two engineer companies. At the time the battalion fielded 527 men (30 officers, 68 non-commissioned officers, and 429 soldiers).

On 12 November 1976, the President of the Italian Republic Giovanni Leone assigned with decree 846 the flag and traditions of the 8th Engineer Regiment to the battalion. The battalion also received the traditions of all engineer units, which had served with the "Nembo" division, "Folgore" divisions, and Combat Group "Folgore".

For its conduct and work after the 1976 Friuli earthquake the battalion was awarded a Bronze Medal of Army Valor, which was affixed to the battalion's flag and added to the battalion's coat of arms.

In 1986, the Mechanized Division "Folgore" was disbanded. Consequently, on 1 August 1986, the battalion was renamed 184th Sappers Battalion "Santerno" and, on 1 November 1986, the battalion was transferred to the 5th Army Corps' Engineer Command. During the same year the battalion formed a third engineer company and the battalion's Command and Park Company split into a Command and Services Company and a Special Equipment Company. Afterwards the battalion consisted of the following units:

- 184th Sappers Battalion "Santerno", in Villa Vicentina
  - Command and Services Company
  - 1st Sappers Company
  - 2nd Sappers Company
  - 3rd Sappers Company
  - Special Equipment Company

=== Recent times ===
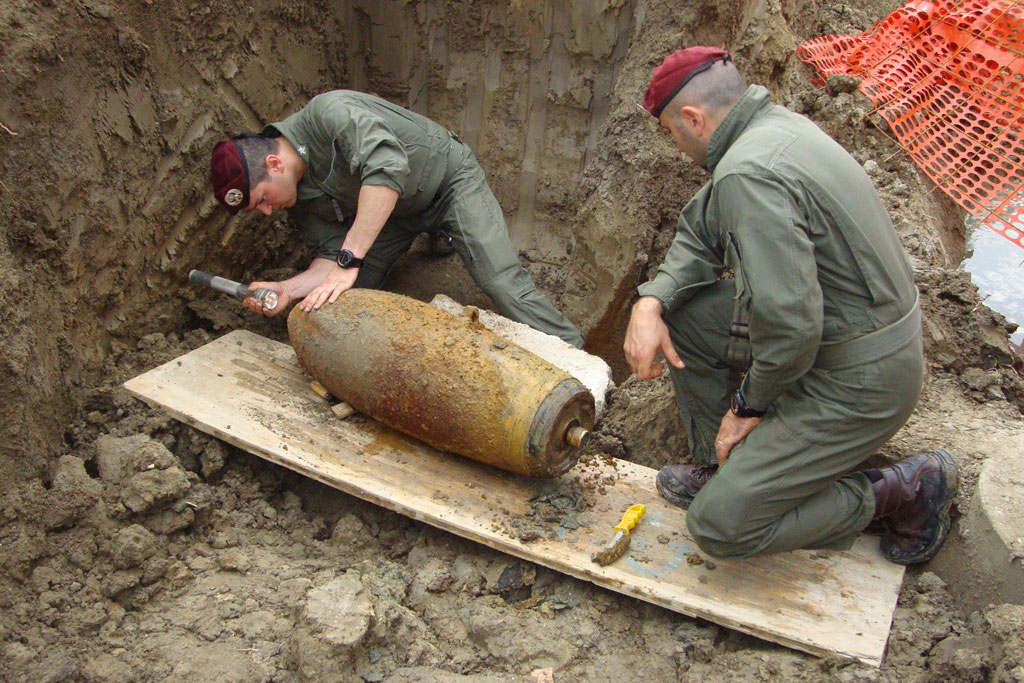
Folgore EOD Team defusing a WWII era bomb

On 10 September 1992, the 184th Sappers Battalion "Santerno" lost its autonomy and the next day the battalion entered the reformed 8th Sappers Regiment. On the same day, the flag and traditions of the 8th Engineer Regiment were transferred from the battalion to the 8th Sappers Regiment. On 28 November 1995, the regiment transferred its flag to the Shrine of the Flags in the Vittoriano in Rome for safekeeping, and two days later, on 30 November 1995, the 8th Sappers Regiment was disbanded.

On 31 August 1995, 5th Engineer Battalion "Bolsena" in Foggia and the 1st Pontieri Engineer Battalion in Legnano were disbanded. The next day, on 1 September 1995, the 1st Pontieri Engineer Battalion's personnel and materiel were used to reform the 5th Engineer Battalion "Bolsena" in Legnano. On 1 December 2000, the 5th Engineer Battalion "Bolsena" was reorganized as an airborne unit and renamed 5th Paratroopers Engineer Battalion "Bolsena". On the same day, the battalion was assigned to the Paratroopers Brigade "Folgore". On 31 May 2001, the 5th Paratroopers Engineer Battalion "Bolsena" was disbanded and the next day the battalion's personnel and materiel were used to reform the 8th Paratroopers Sappers Battalion. The reformed battalion received the flag of the 8th Engineer Regiment, while the flag of the 5th Engineer Regiment, which had been assigned to the 5th Engineer Battalion "Bolsena" in 1975, was transferred to the Shrine of the Flags in the Vittoriano in Rome for safekeeping.

The 8th Paratroopers Sappers Battalion consisted of a command, a command and tactical support company, and four paratroopers sappers companies. The companies were given their historical numbering: 22nd, 23rd and 24th. The fourth company was numbered 21st to commemorate the 21st Paratroopers Company of the VII Paratroopers Battalion, which fought with the VIII Paratroopers Sappers Battalion in the Ruspoli Group during the Second Battle of El Alamein.

On 13 October 2004, the 8th Paratroopers Sappers Battalion lost its autonomy and the next day the battalion entered the reformed 8th Paratroopers Engineer Regiment "Folgore". On the same day, the flag and traditions of the 8th Engineer Regiment were transferred from the battalion to the 8th Paratroopers Engineer Regiment "Folgore".

After the August 2016 earthquake in Central Italy the regiment's companies deployed to the area to assist in the recovery efforts and to provide engineering services to the affected communities. For its service after the earthquake the regiment was awarded a Silver Medal of Army Valor, which was affixed to the regiment's flag and is depicted on the regiment's coat of arms. For its conduct and work during the COVID-19 pandemic the regiment was awarded in 2022 a Silver Cross of Army Merit, which was affixed to the regiment's flag. In 2023, the regiment was awarded a Military Order of Italy for its many deployments outside of Italy. The order was affixed to the regiment's flag and is depicted on the regiment's coat of arms.

== Organization ==
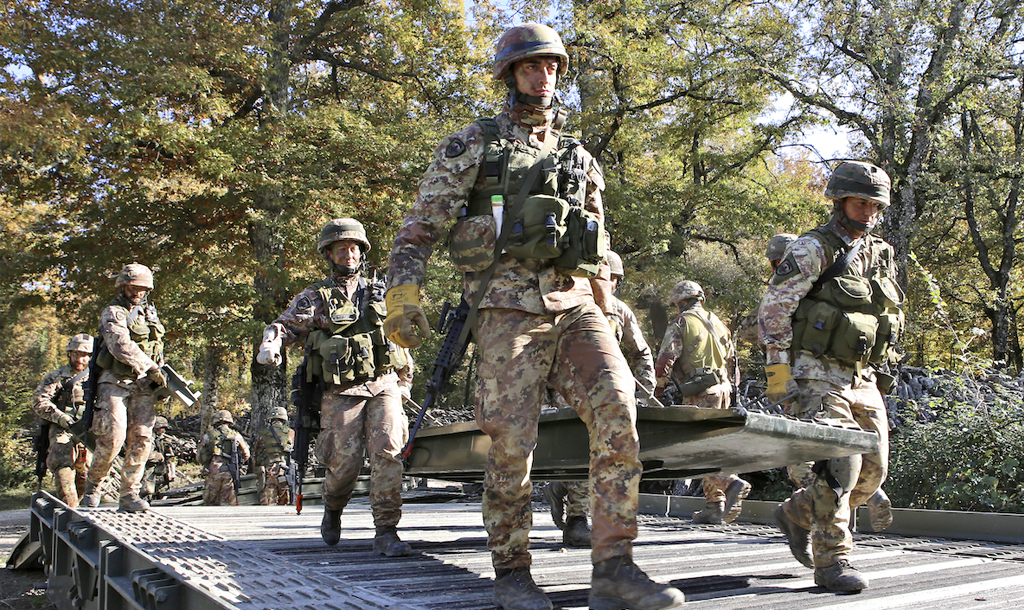
8th Engineer Regiment troops building a Medium Girder Bridge

As of 2024 the 8th Paratroopers Engineer Regiment "Folgore" is organized as follows:

- 8th Paratroopers Engineer Regiment "Folgore", in Legnano
  - Command and Logistic Support Company
  - 8th Paratroopers Sappers Battalion
    - 21st Paratroopers Sappers Company
    - 22nd Paratroopers Sappers Company
    - 23rd Paratroopers Sappers Company
    - 24th Deployment Support Company
