= 7th Signal Regiment (Italy) =

Active Italian Army signal unit

- 7° Reggimento Trasmissioni
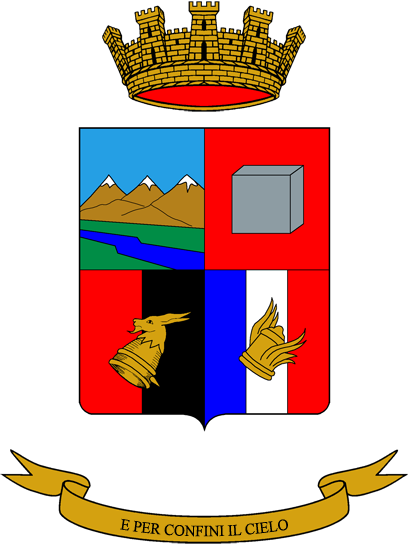
- Regimental coat of arms
- Active: 1 July 1918 — 31 March 1920; 1 Oct. 1975 — today
- Country: Italy
- Branch: Italian Army
- Role: Military signals
- Part of: Signal Command
- Garrison/HQ: Sacile
- Motto(s): "E per confini il cielo"
- Anniversaries: 20 June 1918 - Second Battle of the Piave River
- Decorations: 1× Gold Cross of Army Merit

Insignia
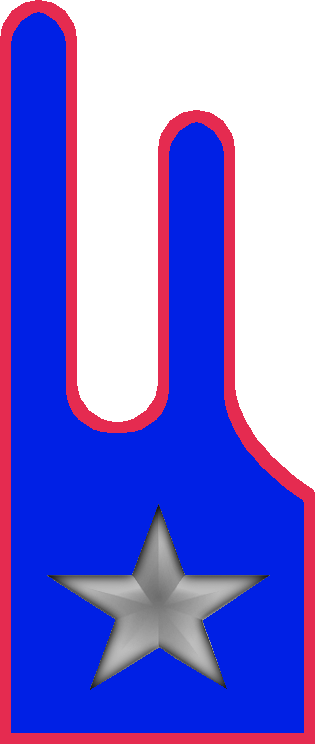
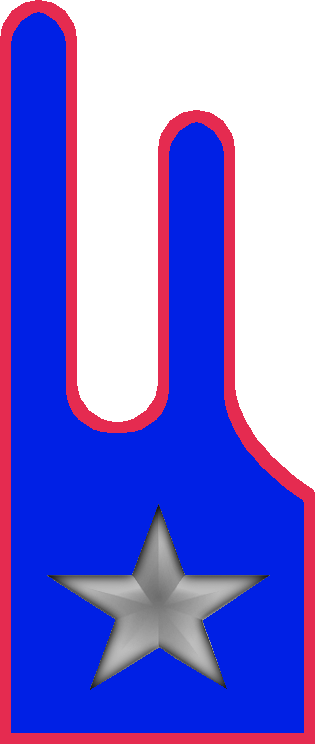
- Signallers gorget patches

The 7th Signal Regiment (Italian: 7° Reggimento Trasmissioni) is an expeditionary signals regiment of the Italian Army based in Sacile in Friuli-Venezia Giulia. In 1918, during World War I, the regiment was formed as 7th Engineer Regiment (Telegraphers) with 59 companies transferred from the 3rd Engineer Regiment (Telegraphers). In 1920, the regiment was disbanded and its companies formed into battalions, which were assigned to the Royal Italian Army's army corps.

In 1948, the unit was reformed as a battalion and given the number V, which had been used by two signal battalions during World War II. During the Cold War the battalion was assigned to the V Army Corps. In 1975, the battalion was named for the Rolle Pass and assigned the flag and traditions of the 7th Engineer Regiment (Telegraphers). In 1991, the battalion lost its autonomy and entered the reformed 7th Signal Regiment. In 2002, the regiment reformed the Signal Battalion "Predil" as its second signal battalion. The regiment is assigned to the army's Signal Command and affiliated with the Division "Vittorio Veneto". The regiment's anniversary falls, as for all signal units, on 20 June 1918, the day the Austro-Hungarian Army began its retreat across the Piave river during the Second Battle of the Piave River.

== History ==
=== World War I ===
On 1 July 1918, during World War I, the 7th Engineer Regiment (Telegraphers) was formed in Piacenza. On the same day, the 3rd Engineer Regiment (Telegraphers) transferred its depots in Piacenza, Verona, and Mantua and 59 telegraphers companies, which had been formed for service on the Italian Front, to the new regiment. The 7th Engineer Regiment (Telegraphers) trained replacement personnel for the companies it had received and formed one more telegraphers company before the war's end.

On 31 March 1920, the 3rd Signal Regiment (Telegraphers) and 7th Signal Regiment (Telegraphers) were disbanded and the next day, on 1 April 1920, the two regiments' companies were used to form an Army Corps Telegraphers Battalion for each of the Royal Italian Army's army corps.

=== Cold War ===
On 1 May 1948, a Connections Battalion was formed in Padua as support unit of the V Territorial Military Command. In March 1950, the battalion was numbered V Connections Battalion and became the spiritual successor of the V Telegraphers Battalion and V Marconisti Battalion, which had both been formed by the 2nd Engineer Regiment during World War II. On 1 October 1952, the Connections Speciality became an autonomous speciality of the Engineer Arm, with its own school and gorget patches. On 16 May 1953, the speciality adopted the name Signal Speciality and consequently, on 1 June 1953, the V Connections Battalion was renamed V Signal Battalion. In January 1954, the battalion was renamed V Army Corps Signal Battalion and consisted of a command, an operations company, a line construction company, and a signals center. In 1961, the battalion formed a second line construction company. In 1965, the battalion moved from Padua to Codroipo.

During the 1975 army reform the army disbanded the regimental level and newly independent battalions were granted for the first time their own flags. During the reform signal battalions were renamed for mountain passes. On 1 October 1975, the V Army Corps Signal Battalion was renamed 5th Signal Battalion "Rolle". The battalion was named for the Rolle Pass, which connects the Fiemme valley and the Primiero valley in the Dolomites. After the reform the 5th Signal Battalion "Rolle" consisted of a command, a command and services platoon, four signal companies, and a repairs and recovery platoon. At the time the battalion fielded 1,099 men (36 officers, 198 non-commissioned officers, and 859 soldiers).

On 12 November 1976, the President of the Italian Republic Giovanni Leone assigned with decree 846 the flag and traditions of the 7th Engineer Regiment (Telegraphers) to the battalion.

In 1976, the battalion moved from Codroipo to Sacile. On 1 June 1989, the battalion was reorganized and consisted afterwards of a command, a command and services company, the 1st Signal Center Company, the 2nd Signal Center Company, and the 3rd Radio Relay Company. On 1 May 1991, the battalion received a second radio relay company from the 232nd Signal Battalion "Fadalto", which had been disbanded the day before.

=== Recent times ===
On 4 October 1991, the 5th Signal Battalion "Rolle" lost its autonomy and the next day the battalion entered the newly formed Signal Regiment "Rolle". On the same day, the flag and traditions of the 7th Engineer Regiment (Telegraphers) were transferred from the battalion to the Signal Regiment "Rolle". On 1 December 1992, the regiment was renamed 7th Signal Regiment, while the battalion was renamed Signal Battalion "Rolle".

On 1 June 1999, the Signal Speciality left the Italian Army's Engineer Arm and was elevated to Signal Arm. In 2000, the regiment was assigned to the army's C4 IEW Command. On 8 January 2002, the regiment reformed Signal Battalion "Predil" as its second signal battalion. Since then the regiment is an expeditionary signal regiment capable to deploy and operate outside Italy.

Between 2000 and 2006, the regiment deployed to Albania, Bosnia and Herzegovina, Kosovo, Afghanistan, Iraq, and Sudan. For its conduct and service in these missions, the regiment was awarded in 2008 a Gold Cross of Army Merit, which was affixed to the regiment's flag.

== Organization ==
As of 2024 the 7th Signal Regiment is organized as follows:

- 7th Signal Regiment, in Sacile
  - Command and Logistic Support Company
  - Signal Battalion "Rolle"
    - 1st Signal Company
    - 2nd Signal Company
    - 3rd Signal Company
  - Signal Battalion "Predil"
    - 4th Signal Company
    - 5th Signal Company
    - 6th Signal Company
