= 47th Signal Battalion "Gennargentu" =

Italian Army signal unit

- 47° Battaglione Trasmissioni "Gennargentu"
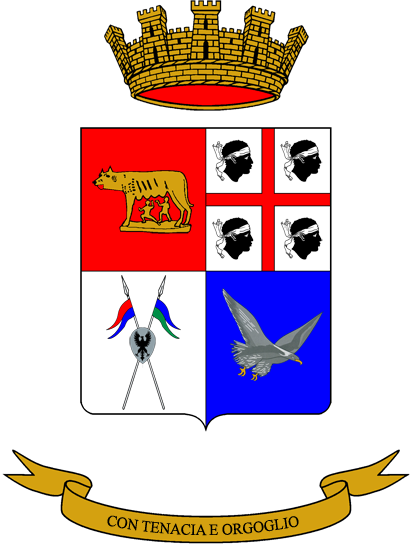
- Battalion coat of arms
- Active: 1 Oct. 1996 — 2000
- Country: Italy
- Branch: Italian Army
- Role: Military signals
- Part of: 3rd Signal Regiment
- Garrison/HQ: Cagliari
- Motto(s): "Con tenacia e orgoglio"
- Anniversaries: 20 June 1918 - Second Battle of the Piave River

Insignia
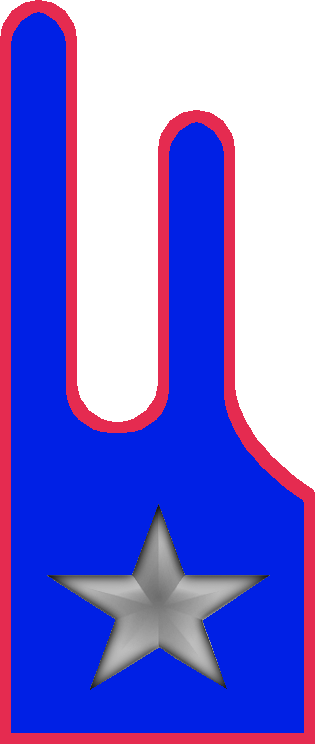
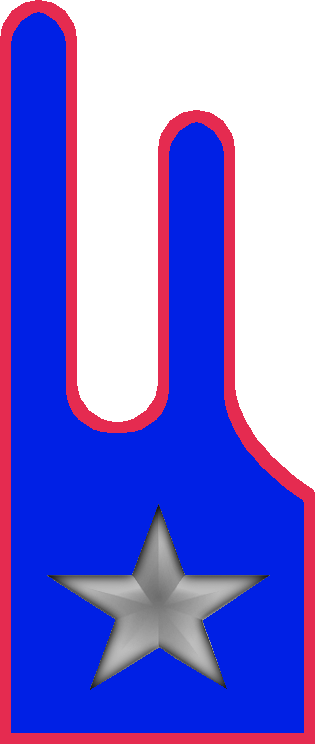
- Signallers gorget patches

The 47th Signal Battalion "Gennargentu" (Italian: 47° Battaglione Trasmissioni "Gennargentu") is a signals battalion of the Italian Army. The battalion operates the army's communications network on the island of Sardinia. During the 1990s, the battalion was an autonomous unit, but in 2000 the battalion lost its autonomy and entered the 3rd Signal Regiment as Signal Battalion "Gennargentu". The battalion is based in Cagliari. The battalion's anniversary falls, as for all signal units, on 20 June 1918, the day the Austro-Hungarian Army began its retreat across the Piave river during the Second Battle of the Piave River.

== History ==
=== Cold War ===
On 31 March 1962, the XLIV Signal Battalion's 3rd Signal Company, which was detached to Cagliari in Sardinia, became an autonomous unit. The next day the company was renamed Signal Company of the Sardinia Military Command and assigned to the Sardinia Military Command. The company consisted of a command, a command squad, a radio platoon, and a wire platoon. In 1967, the two platoons were renamed 1st and 2nd signal platoon.

During the 1975 army reform the army disbanded the regimental level and newly independent battalions were granted for the first time their own flags. During the reform signal battalions were renamed for mountain passes. On 15 November 1975, the Signal Company of the Sardinia Military Command was renamed 47th Signal Company. The same year the company added the 3rd Signal Platoon the company's reserve component.

On 15 April 1985, the company was reorganized and now consisted of a command, a command and services platoon, a signal center platoon, a telecommunications (TLC) management platoon, and a field support platoon. On 1 January 1990, the latter platoon was placed in reserve status.

=== Recent times ===
On 1 Oct 1996, the 47th Signal Company was expanded to 47th Signal Battalion "Gennargentu". The battalion was named for the Gennargentu massif in central Sardinia, which makes the battalion unique among Italian Army signals battalions, as all other signal battalions were named for either an Alpine or Apennine mountain pass or a volcano. On 18 September 1996, the President of the Italian Republic Oscar Luigi Scalfaro granted the battalion a flag. At the time, the battalion consisted of four companies: Command and Services Company, Signal Center Company, TLC Network Management Company, which were all three based in Cagliari, and the Field Support Company, which was based in Nuoro.

On 1 June 1999, the Signal Speciality left the Italian Army's Engineer Arm and was elevated to Signal Arm. In 2000, the battalion lost its autonomy and entered the 3rd Signal Regiment as Signal Battalion "Gennargentu". Subsequently, the flag of the 47th Signal Battalion "Gennargentu" was transferred to the Shrine of the Flags in the Vittoriano in Rome for safekeeping.

== Organization ==
As of 2024 the Signal Battalion "Gennargentu" is organized as follows:

- Signal Battalion "Gennargentu", in Cagliari
  - Command and Logistic Support Company
  - 47th Signal Company — C4 Systems Center
  - Area Support Signal Platoon
